= 1996–97 Port Vale F.C. season =

Port Vale F.C.
1996–97 season
- Chairman: Bill Bell
- Manager: John Rudge
- Stadium: Vale Park
- Football League First Division: 8th (67 points)
- FA Cup: Third Round (eliminated by Blackburn Rovers)
- League Cup: Third Round (eliminated by Oxford United)
- Player of the Year: Lee Mills
- Top goalscorer: League: Tony Naylor (17); All: Tony Naylor (20)
- Highest home attendance: 15,186 vs. Bradford City, 28 January 1997
- Lowest home attendance: 3,505 vs. Carlisle United, 17 September 1996
- Average home league attendance: 7,840
- Biggest win: 6–1 vs. Norwich City, 21 December 1996
- Biggest defeat: 0–3 (twice)
Home colours	Away colours

The 1996–97 season was Port Vale's 85th season of football in the English Football League, and third successive season in the First Division. Despite early turbulence, including fan protests against chairman Bill Bell and the high-profile sale of Steve Guppy to Leicester City for £800,000, Vale secured a highly respectable 8th‑place finish, marking their best post-war league position.

Leading the scoring charts was Tony Naylor, who notched 20 goals across all competitions, establishing himself as the club's top scorer for the season. Lee Mills also made a substantial contribution, scoring 15 goals and earning the Player of the Year honours for his efforts. Vale Park remained busy, with a deep run in cup competitions and numerous standout performances. Nonetheless, the league campaign showcased a squad that blended attacking flair with resilience amid turbulence. Contributions from stalwarts like Jon McCarthy, Andy Porter, Steve Guppy, and Martin Foyle added depth and consistency throughout the season.

In the 1996–97 campaign, Port Vale finished in 8th place. Manager John Rudge remained in his position during boardroom changes and player departures, while Naylor and Mills scored frequently throughout the season.

== Overview ==
=== First Division ===
The pre-season saw John Rudge sign forward Justin O'Reilly from non-League Gresley Rovers for a £30,000 fee.

The season started poorly, with just two wins in the opening 13 games, and protests began to develop against Chairman Bill Bell and his selling policy. On 2 October, Vale defeated Queens Park Rangers at Loftus Road by two goals to one as Rudge experimented with a 4–5–1 formation with Stewart Talbot in place of a striker. A decent October, with wins over Wolverhampton Wanderers at Molineux and Birmingham City at home, was followed by a winless November – in which midfielder Jan Jansson became the first Swede to play for the club when he arrived on loan from IFK Norrköping. However, a run of four consecutive victories in December showed the squad's potential. Tony Naylor put a hat-trick past Charlton Athletic in a 3–1 win at The Valley on 14 December. After the match he said he actually hated playing as a lone striker but conceded that "it worked ok today". The following week Vale pulled Norwich City apart in a 6–1 win – Martin Foyle and Stewart Talbot both claiming braces. Norwich manager Mike Walker said that "the second half was a complete shambles". The run was topped off with a 1–0 win over Manchester City in front of over 30,000 people at Maine Road. Meanwhile, O'Reilly was loaned out to Macclesfield Town to gain experience.

Vale's form tailed off, and on 19 January, they managed to go from 4–0 up against Queens Park Rangers at half-time to finish the game drawn 4–4, with Jermaine Holwijn scoring an own goal on his debut. Vale had scored a fifth goal, but the linesman had not seen the ball cross the goalline. In February, Rudge spent £75,000 to bring Dutch midfielder Rogier Koordes in from Telstar. On 23 February, Vale recorded a 2–1 win away at Birmingham City after putting in a "disciplined if unspectacular performance" as they came from a goal down following Paul Devlin's eighth-minute penalty – Glover made up for giving away the penalty by scoring the winning goal. However, it was Steve Guppy's last game for the club, who was sold to Premier League side Leicester City for £850,000. On 31 March, a brace from Lee Mills secured a 2–1 home win over Tranmere Rovers. A late spurt of form saw them win four straight games to stand a great chance of reaching the play-offs with just three games to go. O'Reilly was moved to Southport in April, having not appeared in the Vale first-team. On 12 April, Vale beat Oldham Athletic 3–2 thanks to a goal from Mills and two from Naylor, leaving the club in the play-off places with three games left. Captain Neil Aspin correctly theorised that "this may be the best chance we ever have of reaching the play-offs". Rivals Stoke City managed to dampen Vale's hopes by easing to a 2–0 victory at the Victoria Ground. More damaging, though, was the defeat at home to Wolves and a final-day draw with eventual play-off winners Crystal Palace at Selhurst Park.

They finished eighth with 67 points (a mere four points off Palace in the play-offs), representing their highest finish since 1933–34. They finished three points and four places higher than Stoke.

At the end of the season, legendary midfielder Ray Walker ended his nine years of association with the club, becoming a player-coach with non-League Leek Town. Another popular player's Vale career was starting, however, with Jan Jansson signing permanently for a £200,000 fee.

=== Finances ===
The club's shirt sponsors were Tunstall Assurance. The club made a profit of £621,000 for the season, primarily due to the sale of Steve Guppy.

=== Cup competitions ===
In the FA Cup, Premier League Blackburn Rovers proved to be too strong, as Vale left Ewood Park having suffered a 1–0 defeat.

In the League Cup, nearby Second Division side Crewe Alexandra lost 1–0 at Vale Park, before Vale blasted them away with a 5–1 win at Gresty Road. They then advanced past Third Division Carlisle United with a 3–2 aggregate victory. Pitted against Oxford United in the third round, a 2–0 defeat at the Manor Ground meant Vale were out of the competition.

== Results ==
=== Pre-season ===
26 July 1996 Isle of Man International Football Festival	Wrexham	2–2 (6–5 p)	Port Vale	Douglas, Isle of Man
14:45 BST	Connolly 51'; Watkin 75'	Report	Naylor 45'; McGregor 47' (og.)	Stadium: National Sports Centre; Attendance: 450; Referee: R Radcliffe; Assistant referees: A Quayle, K Giles; Fourth official: P Crompton
	Penalties
	Hardy (penalty missed); Watkin (penalty scored); Brammer (penalty scored); Connolly (penalty scored); Chalk (penalty scored); Williams (penalty scored); Carey (penalty missed); Phillips (penalty scored)

=== Football League First Division ===
==== League table ====
Pos	Team	Pld	W	D	L	GF	GA	GD	Pts	Qualification or relegation
6	Crystal Palace (O, P)	46	19	14	13	78	48	+30	71	Qualification for the First Division play-offs
7	Portsmouth	46	20	8	18	59	53	+6	68	
8	Port Vale	46	17	16	13	58	55	+3	67	
9	Queens Park Rangers	46	18	12	16	64	60	+4	66	
10	Birmingham City	46	17	15	14	52	48	+4	66	

Rules for classification: 1) Points; 2) Goals scored; 3) Goal difference
(O) Play-off winners; (P) Promoted

==== Results by matchday ====
Round	1	2	3	4	5	6	7	8	9	10	11	12	13	14	15	16	17	18	19	20	21	22	23	24	25	26	27	28	29	30	31	32	33	34	35	36	37	38	39	40	41	42	43	44	45	46
Ground	H	A	A	H	A	H	H	A	H	A	A	H	H	A	A	H	H	A	H	A	H	A	A	H	A	H	A	H	H	A	H	A	H	A	H	A	A	H	A	H	H	A	H	A	H	A
Result	D	D	L	W	D	L	D	D	D	W	L	D	L	W	W	L	W	D	D	L	D	W	W	W	W	L	D	D	W	L	D	L	D	W	W	L	D	W	L	W	W	W	W	L	L	D
Position	10	16	18	13	12	17	19	18	19	14	15	17	20	15	11	13	12	10	11	14	16	15	12	9	8	9	10	11	7	8	8	12	10	9	7	9	8	8	8	6	5	5	5	6	8	8
Points	1	2	2	5	6	6	7	8	9	12	12	13	13	16	19	19	22	23	24	24	25	28	31	34	37	37	38	39	42	42	43	43	44	47	50	50	51	54	54	57	60	63	66	66	66	67

Source: Statto
A = Away; H = Home; W = Win; D = Draw; L = Loss

==== Matches ====
17 August 1996 1	Port Vale	1–1	Bolton Wanderers	Burslem
	Naylor 72'	Report	Thompson 23'	Stadium: Vale Park; Attendance: 10,057

24 August 1996 2	Swindon Town	1–1	Port Vale	Swindon
	Robinson 62'	Report	McCarthy 32'	Stadium: County Ground; Attendance: 8,706; Referee: G. Pooley

27 August 1996 3	Tranmere Rovers	2–0	Port Vale	Prenton
	Mahon 45'; Branch 44'	Report		Stadium: Prenton Park; Attendance: 6,123

31 August 1996 4	Port Vale	2–0	Oxford United	Burslem
	Naylor 41'; Mills 62'	Report		Stadium: Vale Park; Attendance: 6,016

7 September 1996 5	Portsmouth	1–1	Port Vale	Portsmouth
	Russell 23'	Report	Porter 58'	Stadium: Fratton Park; Attendance: 6,448

10 September 1996 6	Port Vale	0–2	Manchester City	Burslem
		Report	Rösler 10'; Dickov 68'	Stadium: Vale Park; Attendance: 10,770; Referee: Neale Barry

14 September 1996 7	Port Vale	1–1	Grimsby Town	Burslem
	Hill 12'	Report	Southall 27'	Stadium: Vale Park; Attendance: 4,892

21 September 1996 8	Southend United	0–0	Port Vale	Southend-on-Sea
		Report		Stadium: Roots Hall; Attendance: 4,025

29 September 1996 9	Bradford City	1–1	Port Vale	Bradford
	Jacobs 83'	Report	Guppy 37'	Stadium: Valley Parade; Attendance: 4,706

2 October 1996 10	Queens Park Rangers	1–2	Port Vale	Shepherd's Bush, West London
	Barker 79'	Report	Guppy 70'; Naylor 76'	Stadium: Loftus Road; Attendance: 8,727

5 October 1996 11	Oldham Athletic	3–0	Port Vale	Oldham
	Ormondroyd 15', 38'; Banger 42'	Report		Stadium: Boundary Park; Attendance: 6,051

13 October 1996 12	Port Vale	1–1	Stoke City	Burslem
	Mills 90'	Report	Keen 65'	Stadium: Vale Park; Attendance: 14,396

16 October 1996 13	Port Vale	0–2	Crystal Palace	Burslem
		Report	Dyer; Roberts	Stadium: Vale Park; Attendance: 4,522

19 October 1996 14	Wolverhampton Wanderers	0–1	Port Vale	Wolverhampton
		Report	Naylor 65'	Stadium: Molineux Stadium; Attendance: 22,755; Referee: D Orr

26 October 1996 15	Huddersfield Town	0–1	Port Vale	Huddersfield
		Report	McCarthy 54'	Stadium: Kirklees Stadium; Attendance: 11,017

29 October 1996 16	Port Vale	1–3	Barnsley	Burslem
	Guppy 52'	Report	Hendrie 45' de Zeeuw 62'; Marcelle 88'	Stadium: Vale Park; Attendance: 5,231

2 November 1996 17	Port Vale	3–0	Birmingham City	Burslem
	Naylor 22', 41'; Guppy 68'	Report		Stadium: Vale Park; Attendance: 8,388

9 November 1996 18	West Bromwich Albion	1–1	Port Vale	West Bromwich
	Taylor 35'	Report	Guppy 17'	Stadium: The Hawthorns; Attendance: 13,975

16 November 1996 19	Port Vale	0–0	Sheffield United	Burslem
		Report		Stadium: Vale Park; Attendance: 8,352

23 November 1996 20	Ipswich Town	2–1	Port Vale	Ipswich
	Tanner 34'; Mason 77'	Report	Naylor	Stadium: Portman Road; Attendance: 9,491

30 November 1996 21	Port Vale	0–0	Huddersfield Town	Burslem
		Report		Stadium: Vale Park; Attendance: 6,026

7 December 1996 22	Reading	0–1	Port Vale	Reading, Berkshire
		Report	Talbot 73'	Stadium: Elm Park; Attendance: 6,445

14 December 1996 23	Charlton Athletic	1–3	Port Vale	Charlton, London
	Chapple 21'	Report	Naylor 34', 46', 49'	Stadium: The Valley; Attendance: 10,003

21 December 1996 24	Port Vale	6–1	Norwich City	Burslem
	Porter 7'; Talbot 43', 62'; Foyle 47', 90'; Mills 69'	Report	Fleck 90'	Stadium: Vale Park; Attendance: 6,278

26 December 1996 25	Manchester City	0–1	Port Vale	Manchester
		Report	Foyle 42'	Stadium: Maine Road; Attendance: 30,344; Referee: Roger Furnandiz

28 December 1996 26	Port Vale	0–2	Portsmouth	Burslem
		Report	Hall 11'; Svensson 47'	Stadium: Vale Park; Attendance: 7,382

11 January 1997 27	Grimsby Town	1–1	Port Vale	Cleethorpes
	Mendonca 54'	Report	Tankard 62'	Stadium: Blundell Park; Attendance: 3,863

19 January 1997 28	Port Vale	4–4	Queens Park Rangers	Burslem
	Glover 24'; Mills 35'; Jansson 41'; Brazier 45' (og.)	Report	Holwyn 66' (og.); Impey 85'; Murray 88'; Spencer 90'	Stadium: Vale Park; Attendance: 5,736

25 January 1997 29	Port Vale	2–1	Southend United	Burslem
	Guppy 56'; McCarthy 84'	Report	Thomson 37'	Stadium: Vale Park; Attendance: 5,588

28 January 1997 30	Port Vale	0–1	Bradford City	Burslem
		Report	Watson 20'	Stadium: Vale Park; Attendance: 15,186

1 February 1997 31	Port Vale	2–2	West Bromwich Albion	Burslem
	Naylor 23', 82'	Report	Peschisolido 7', 61'	Stadium: Vale Park; Attendance: 8,093

8 February 1997 32	Barnsley	1–0	Port Vale	Barnsley
	Hendrie 26'	Report		Stadium: Oakwell; Attendance: 12,246

15 February 1997 33	Port Vale	2–2	Ipswich Town	Burslem
	Mills 40'; Porter 43' (pen.)	Report	Mason 9'; Stockwell 69'	Stadium: Vale Park; Attendance: 6,115

23 February 1997 34	Birmingham City	1–2	Port Vale	Birmingham
	Devlin 8' (pen.)	Report	Porter 16'; Glover 54'	Stadium: St Andrew's; Attendance: 13,192

1 March 1997 35	Port Vale	1–0	Reading	Burslem
	Naylor 45'	Report		Stadium: Vale Park; Attendance: 6,057

4 March 1997 36	Sheffield United	3–0	Port Vale	Sheffield
	Ward 62' (pen.); Taylor 79'; Fjørtoft 82'	Report		Stadium: Bramall Lane; Attendance: 14,950

8 March 1997 37	Norwich City	1–1	Port Vale	Norwich
	Jackson 11'	Report	McCarthy 26'	Stadium: Carrow Road; Attendance: 16,101

15 March 1997 38	Port Vale	2–0	Charlton Athletic	Burslem
	Mills 54', 62'	Report		Stadium: Vale Park; Attendance: 5,905

18 March 1997 39	Bolton Wanderers	4–2	Port Vale	Bolton
	Frandsen 9'; Glover 38' (og.); Fairclough 81'; Blake 83'	Report	Bogie 3'; Talbot 50'	Stadium: Burnden Park; Attendance: 14,150

22 March 1997 40	Port Vale	1–0	Swindon Town	Burslem
	Mills 52'	Report		Stadium: Vale Park; Attendance: 6,142; Referee: E. Lomas

31 March 1997 41	Port Vale	2–1	Tranmere Rovers	Burslem
	Mills 36', 52'	Report	Irons 23'	Stadium: Vale Park; Attendance: 7,469

5 April 1997 42	Oxford United	0–2	Port Vale	Oxford
		Report	Mills 31'; Naylor 87'	Stadium: Manor Ground; Attendance: 7,370

12 April 1997 43	Port Vale	3–2	Oldham Athletic	Burslem
	Naylor 32', 85'; Mills 76'	Report	Garnett 45'; Duxbury 82'	Stadium: Vale Park; Attendance: 8,114

20 April 1997 44	Stoke City	2–0	Port Vale	Stoke-upon-Trent
	Sheron 44', 85'	Report		Stadium: Victoria Ground; Attendance: 16,246

27 April 1997 45	Port Vale	1–2	Wolverhampton Wanderers	Burslem
	Naylor 40'	Report	Thomas 34'; Atkins 42'	Stadium: Vale Park; Attendance: 13,615; Referee: W Burns

4 May 1997 46	Crystal Palace	1–1	Port Vale	Selhurst, Croydon
	Roberts 12'	Report	Mills 61'	Stadium: Selhurst Park; Attendance: 16,401

=== FA Cup ===
4 January 1997 R3	Blackburn Rovers	1–0	Port Vale	Blackburn
	Bohinen 68'	Report		Stadium: Ewood Park; Attendance: 19,891

=== League Cup ===
20 August 1996 R1 1st Leg	Port Vale	1–0	Crewe Alexandra	Burslem
	Naylor 22'	Report		Stadium: Vale Park; Attendance: 5,236

3 September 1996 R1 2nd Leg	Crewe Alexandra	1–5 (1–6 agg.)	Port Vale	Crewe
	Adebola 16'	Report	Bogie 26'; McCarthy 34'; Foyle 75'; Naylor 84'; Mills 85'	Stadium: Gresty Road; Attendance: 4,471

17 September 1996 R2 1st Leg	Port Vale	1–0	Carlisle United	Burslem
	Naylor 49'	Report		Stadium: Vale Park; Attendance: 3,505

24 September 1996 R2 2nd Leg	Carlisle United	2–2 (2–3 agg.)	Port Vale	Carlisle
	Thomas 8', 74'	Report	McCarthy 41'; Mills 78'	Stadium: Brunton Park; Attendance: 5,545

22 October 1996 R3 1st Leg	Port Vale	0–0	Oxford United	Burslem
		Report		Stadium: Vale Park; Attendance: 4,942

5 November 1996 R3 2nd Leg	Oxford United	2–0 (2–0 agg.)	Port Vale	Oxford
	Jemson 13', 39'	Report		Stadium: Manor Ground; Attendance: 5,279

== Squad statistics ==
=== Appearances and goals ===
Key to positions: GK – Goalkeeper; DF – Defender; MF – Midfielder; FW – Forward

No.	Pos	Nat	Player	Total		First Division		FA Cup		League Cup	
No.	Pos	Nat	Player	Apps	Goals	Apps	Goals	Apps	Goals	Apps	Goals
	GK	(England) ENG	Matthew Boswell	0	0	0	0	0	0	0	0
	GK	(England) ENG	Paul Musselwhite	36	0	33	0	1	0	2	0
	GK	(Netherlands) NED	Arjan van Heusden	17	0	13	0	0	0	4	0
	DF	(England) ENG	Neil Aspin	38	0	33	0	1	0	4	0
	DF	(England) ENG	Dean Glover	48	2	42	2	1	0	5	0
	DF	(England) ENG	Gareth Griffiths	31	0	26	0	1	0	4	0
	DF	(England) ENG	Andy Hill	43	1	38	1	0	0	5	0
	DF	(Netherlands) NED	Jermaine Holwyn	7	0	7	0	0	0	0	0
	DF	(Northern Ireland) NIR	Jon McCarthy	52	6	45	4	1	0	6	2
	DF	(England) ENG	Dean Stokes	11	0	10	0	1	0	0	0
	DF	(England) ENG	Allen Tankard	44	1	37	1	1	0	6	0
	MF	(England) ENG	Ian Bogie	36	2	31	1	1	0	4	1
	MF	(England) ENG	Wayne Corden	13	0	12	0	0	0	1	0
	MF	(Netherlands) NED	Rogier Koordes	13	0	13	0	0	0	0	0
	MF	(England) ENG	Andy Porter	51	4	44	4	1	0	6	0
	MF	(England) ENG	Stewart Talbot	36	4	34	4	0	0	2	0
	MF	(England) ENG	Ray Walker	19	0	17	0	0	0	2	0
	FW	(England) ENG	Martin Foyle	43	4	37	3	1	0	5	1
	FW	(England) ENG	Lee Mills	41	15	35	13	0	0	6	2
	FW	(England) ENG	Tony Naylor	49	20	43	17	1	0	5	3
	FW	(England) ENG	Justin O'Reilly	0	0	0	0	0	0	0	0
Players who featured but departed the club during the season:
	MF	(England) ENG	Steve Guppy	40	6	34	6	1	0	5	0
	MF	(Sweden) SWE	Jan Jansson	12	1	11	1	1	0	0	0

=== Top scorers ===
Place	Position	Nation	Name	First Division	FA Cup	League Cup	Total
1	FW	England	Tony Naylor	17	0	3	20
2	FW	England	Lee Mills	13	0	2	15
3	MF	England	Steve Guppy	6	0	0	6
–	FW	Northern Ireland	Jon McCarthy	4	0	2	6
5	MF	England	Stewart Talbot	4	0	0	4
–	MF	England	Andy Porter	4	0	0	4
–	FW	England	Martin Foyle	3	0	1	4
8	FW	England	Ian Bogie	1	0	1	2
–	DF	England	Dean Glover	2	0	0	2
10	DF	England	Allen Tankard	1	0	0	1
–	DF	England	Andy Hill	1	0	0	1
–	MF	Sweden	Jan Jansson	1	0	0	1
			TOTALS	58	0	9	67

== Transfers ==
=== Transfers in ===
Date from	Position	Nationality	Name	From	Fee	Ref.
February 1997	MF	NED	Rogier Koordes	(Netherlands) SC Telstar	£75,000	

=== Transfers out ===
Date from	Position	Nationality	Name	To	Fee	Ref.
28 February 1997	MF	ENG	Steve Guppy	Leicester City	£850,000	
May 1997	MF	ENG	Ray Walker	Leek Town	Free transfer	

=== Loans in ===
Date from	Position	Nationality	Name	From	Date to	Ref.
November 1996	MF	SWE	Jan Jansson	(Sweden) IFK Norrköping	January 1991	

=== Loans out ===
Date from	Position	Nationality	Name	From	Date to	Ref.
23 September 1996	GK	ENG	Matthew Boswell	Hinkley Town	1996	
6 December 1996	GK	ENG	Matthew Boswell	Redditch United	?	
