= Derek McGill =

Scottish footballer

Personal information
- Full name: Derek McGill
- Date of birth: 14 October 1975 (age 51)
- Place of birth: Lanark, Scotland
- Height: 6 ft 0 in (1.83 m)
- Position: Forward

Senior career*
Years	Team	Apps	(Gls)
1993–1996	Falkirk		
1996	Hamilton Academical		
1996–1998	Raith Rovers	25	(4)
1998	Queen's Park	4	(1)
1998	Port Vale	3	(0)
1998	Hamilton Academical	3	(0)
- * Club domestic league appearances and goals

Derek McGill (born 14 October 1975) is a Scottish former footballer who played as a forward. He enjoyed a five-year professional career in Scotland with Falkirk, Hamilton Academical, Raith Rovers, and Queen's Park; and also briefly played for English club Port Vale.

== Career ==
McGill started his career with Falkirk in 1993, but after three years, he moved on to Hamilton Academical. Four goals for the Second Division club justified a move into the Premier Division with Raith Rovers in 1996. He was forced to move home five times after giving evidence as a prosecution witness at the High Court in Airdrie and was sentenced to 100 hours community service after being caught with a machete he was using as protection. He made eight appearances in the 1996–97 season. Rovers were relegated and the next season McGill was used more frequently in the First Division. He bagged a brace on his return to Douglas Park, as Academicals had achieved promotion the previous season.

In September 1998, McGill completed his Scottish Football League set by dropping into the Third Division with Queen's Park. The next month, he moved south to England, signing for Port Vale in the First Division on a free transfer. He made three substitute appearances away from Vale Park before returning to the Scottish First Division in December 1998 with old club Hamilton. However, he was released before the year was out.

== Career statistics ==
Appearances and goals by club, season and competition
Club	Season	League			National cup (Note: Includes Scottish Cup, FA Cup)		League cup (Note: Includes Scottish League Cup, Football League Cup)		Other		Total (Note: Statistics pre-Raith Rovers are unavailable)	
Club	Season	Division	Apps	Goals	Apps	Goals	Apps	Goals	Apps	Goals	Apps	Goals
Raith Rovers	1996–97	Premier Division	8	0	0	0	0	0	—		8	0
Raith Rovers	1997–98	First Division	17	4	0	0	0	0	0	0	17	4
Raith Rovers	Total		25	4	0	0	0	0	0	0	25	4
Queen's Park	1998–99	Third Division	4	1	0	0	0	0	0	0	4	1
Port Vale	1998–99	First Division	3	0	0	0	0	0	—		3	0
Hamilton Academical	1998–99	First Division	3	0	0	0	0	0	0	0	3	0
