= Alan Lee (footballer) =

Irish footballer (born 1978)

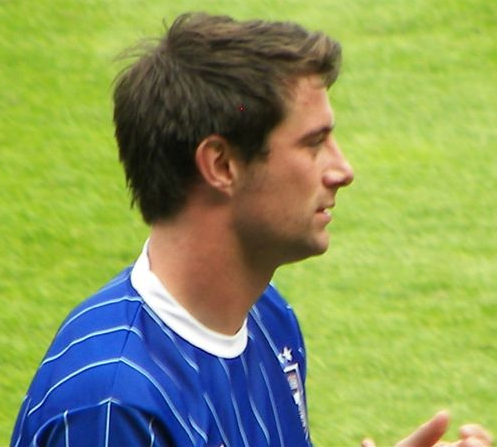
- Lee playing for Ipswich Town in 2007

Personal information
- Full name: Alan Desmond Lee
- Date of birth: 21 August 1978 (age 48)
- Place of birth: Galway, Ireland
- Height: 6 ft 2 in (1.88 m)
- Position: Forward

Youth career
- 1994–1995: Aston Villa

Senior career*
Years	Team	Apps	(Gls)
1995–1999	Aston Villa	0	(0)
1998–1999	→ Torquay United (loan)	7	(2)
1999	→ Port Vale (loan)	11	(2)
1999–2000	Burnley	15	(0)
2000–2003	Rotherham United	111	(37)
2003–2006	Cardiff City	86	(10)
2006–2008	Ipswich Town	103	(31)
2008–2010	Crystal Palace	61	(10)
2009	→ Norwich City (loan)	7	(2)
2010–2013	Huddersfield Town	80	(8)
2013–2014	Ipswich Town	0	(0)
Total		481	(102)

International career
1997–1998	Republic of Ireland U21	5	(0)
2003–2006	Republic of Ireland	10	(0)
- * Club domestic league appearances and goals

Alan Desmond Lee (born 21 August 1978) is an Irish former professional footballer who played as a striker. He scored 119 goals in 547 appearances in a 19-year professional career in the Football League and won 10 caps for the Republic of Ireland.

He started his career with Aston Villa, also playing on loan at Torquay United and Port Vale. Following a season with Burnley, he signed with Rotherham United in 2000. He is considered something of a cult hero at the club, after helping the "Millers" to win promotion out of the Second Division in 2000–01. He was bought by Cardiff City and made almost 100 appearances for the Welsh side between 2003 and 2006. Then purchased by Ipswich Town, he made over 100 appearances for the club before earning a big money move to Crystal Palace. After returning from a loan spell at Norwich City, he wrote himself into the club's folklore by scoring in the final game of the 2009–10 season against Sheffield Wednesday, saving the Eagles from relegation and ultimately administration. Following these heroics, he moved on to Huddersfield Town and helped the "Terriers" to win promotion out of League One in 2012. He announced his retirement in 2014, having spent his final season as a player-coach at Ipswich Town.

== Club career ==
=== Aston Villa ===
Born in Galway, County Galway, Ireland, Lee began his career as a trainee with Aston Villa before turning professional in August 1995. However, he never made his first-team debut at Villa Park. He joined Torquay United on loan on 27 November 1998 and made his debut the following day in the Third Division in a 3–1 defeat to Barnet at Underhill; he replaced Tony Bedeau as a substitute at half-time. He made his full debut at Plainmoor on 12 December in a 2–0 win over Hull City. He scored his first league goal on boxing day, which secured a 1–1 draw with Exeter City at St James Park. He also scored against Southend United and Fulham to take his tally for Wes Saunders's "Gulls" up to three goals in nine appearances.

On 2 March 1999, he joined Brian Horton's Port Vale on a two-month loan. Making 11 appearances, he scored in draws with Bradford City and Tranmere Rovers, helping the "Valiants" to avoid relegation out of the First Division on goal difference.

=== Burnley ===
He left Villa in July 1999 when Burnley manager Stan Ternent signed him for a £150,000 fee. He scored once for Burnley; in a 2–1 Football League Trophy defeat at Wigan Athletic. He played 15 league games as the "Clarets" won promotion out of the Second Division as runners-up in 1999–2000. Though a successful season for the club, Lee never had an extended first-team run at Turf Moor, and only had two league starts as Andy Payton and Andy Cooke formed an effective partnership up front.

=== Rotherham United ===
Lee moved to Rotherham United for £150,000 in November 2000 after a short loan spell. In his first season at the club, 2000–01, he scored 15 goals in 35 games as Ronnie Moore's "Millers" won promotion out of the Second Division as runners-up. Lee scored the late winner against Brentford which sealed promotion. He remained a key fixture at Millmoor in the First Division, scoring ten goals in 41 games in 2001–02, and finding the net 16 times in 44 appearances in 2002–03.

=== Cardiff City ===
He was sold to Cardiff City in August 2003 for a fee of £850,000, just days after impressing Cardiff manager Lennie Lawrence in a goalless draw on the opening day of the season. Rotherham's manager Ronnie Moore prophesied that "Alan Lee can and will do better than Cardiff". However, Lee found himself struggling with injuries at Ninian Park and largely out of first-team contention. He scored three goals in only 24 games in 2003–04, though he managed seven goals in 43 appearances in 2004–05. However, he was restricted to just two goals in 25 Championship games in 2005–06.

=== Ipswich Town ===
In January 2006 joined Ipswich Town for £100,000. He scored his second career hat-trick in a 5–0 win against Luton Town on 29 October 2006. He ended the 2006–07 campaign with 17 goals in 44 games, including a header that relegated Leeds United on the last day of that season. He penned a new deal with the club in August 2007. In January 2008 there was speculation of a move back to Burnley for £900,000 but the Ipswich chairman and Lee himself denied these rumours. He completed his season with a tally of 12 goals, including the winner in Ipswich's 1–0 win against Hull City on the final day of the season.

=== Crystal Palace ===
On 30 August 2008, Lee moved again, leaving Ipswich for Crystal Palace for a fee of around £640,000. He signed a three-year contract with the club, saying that "I jumped at the chance to go an play for Neil Warnock". In March 2009, he moved out on loan to Norwich City, his spell lasting for the rest of the season. Norwich went close to signing Lee permanently six years previously, but lost out to Cardiff. His performances at Norwich earned him public praise from captain Gary Doherty. In the summer he came close to a move to Barnsley, but the two clubs could not reach a deal.

After returning to Selhurst Park, Lee became a fan's favourite and a cult hero due to the tremendous effort he displayed throughout his second season at Palace, culminating in him scoring a bullet header in Palace's 2–2 draw with Sheffield Wednesday on the last day of the season, saving Palace from relegation. However, he fell down the pecking order following the arrivals of Pablo Counago and Jon Obika.

=== Huddersfield Town ===
In August 2010, Lee transferred to Huddersfield Town for an undisclosed fee, which was later reported to be £350,000. He made his debut for the Terriers in a 3–1 win over Charlton Athletic at the Galpharm Stadium on 28 August 2010. He quickly established a reputation cult hero with the Huddersfield supporters. On 30 October he was sent off in a league match against Walsall at the Galpharm, where Town won 1–0. On 30 January 2011, he scored his first goal for Huddersfield in an FA Cup fourth round 2–1 defeat to Arsenal at the Emirates Stadium. He added to his tally with a brace against Carlisle United in the Football League Trophy, though he remained goalless throughout 28 league games. He was a late substitute in the club's play-off final defeat to Peterborough United at Old Trafford.

Lee scored his first league goals for the "Terriers" during a 3–0 win over Wycombe Wanderers on 27 August 2011. The first goal came from his first touch of the game 40 seconds after making it onto the pitch as a second-half substitute before he finished the game with a brace. He finished the 2011–12 campaign with seven goals in 38 games and was an extra time substitute in the play-off final victory over Sheffield United at Wembley Stadium, though missed his penalty in the shoot-out.

Lee scored his first goal of the 2012–13 season in a 3–2 home defeat by Watford after replacing newly signed emergency loanee Jermaine Beckford. After a 1–0 win over Barnsley at Oakwell on 10 November, Lee said that "[the fans] are so supportive of me it just melts my heart." At the end of the season, it was announced that he was to be released along with Scott Arfield and Tom Clarke.

=== Return to Ipswich Town ===
Lee returned to Ipswich Town in July 2013 as part of the club's academy staff and later began training with the first team after Mick McCarthy considered handing him a first-team contract. He re-signed as a player on non-contract terms on 30 August, allowing him to play in the club's first-team whilst retaining his academy coaching position. He made an appearance in the FA Cup, coming on as a late substitute in a 3–2 defeat to Preston North End on 14 January. He remained registered as a player for the 2014–15 season if his services as a player would be required due to an injury crisis. He was forced to retire due to injury in July 2014, having undergone knee surgery over the summer.

== International career ==
Lee represented the Republic of Ireland internationally and earned five caps for the Irish under-21 side. However, many feel he was overlooked by the national team during his time at Rotherham, when he scored 37 league goals over three seasons. He was though utilised for his country whilst with Cardiff making ten appearances for the Republic of Ireland between 2003 and 2006.

== Coaching career ==
In July 2013, Lee began coaching at Ipswich Town's academy. In May 2018, he also began working as the head of Culford School's new football programme. By the end of the year he had left his role at Ipswich Town to coach at Bury Town.

== Style of play ==
The Rotherham United website stated that Lee was a "strong and very quick striker... with no mean skill." He said that he preferred playing as a lone striker, though was comfortable with any type of partner.

== Career statistics ==
=== Club ===
Appearances and goals by club, season and competition
Season	Club	League			FA Cup		League Cup		Other		Total	
Season	Club	Division	Apps	Goals	Apps	Goals	Apps	Goals	Apps	Goals	Apps	Goals
Aston Villa	1995–96	Premier League	0	0	0	0	0	0	—		0	0
Aston Villa	1996–97	Premier League	0	0	0	0	0	0	0	0	0	0
Aston Villa	1997–98	Premier League	0	0	0	0	0	0	0	0	0	0
Aston Villa	1998–99	Premier League	0	0	0	0	0	0	0	0	0	0
Aston Villa	Total		0	0	0	0	0	0	0	0	0	0
Torquay United (loan)	1998–99	Third Division	7	2	0	0	0	0	2 (Note: Appearance(s) in Football League Trophy)	1	9	3
Port Vale (loan)	1998–99	First Division	11	2	0	0	0	0	—		11	2
Burnley	1999–2000	Second Division	15	0	2	0	2	0	1	1	20	1
Rotherham United	2000–01	Second Division	31	13	3	1	0	0	1	1	35	15
Rotherham United	2001–02	First Division	38	9	1	0	2	1	—		41	10
Rotherham United	2002–03	First Division	41	15	1	0	2	1	—		44	16
Rotherham United	2003–04	First Division	1	0	0	0	1	0	—		2	0
Rotherham United	Total		111	37	5	1	5	2	1	1	122	41
Cardiff City	2003–04	First Division	23	3	1	0	0	0	0	0	24	3
Cardiff City	2004–05	Championship	38	5	2	1	3	1	0	0	43	7
Cardiff City	2005–06	Championship	25	2	1	0	3	0	0	0	29	2
Cardiff City	Total		86	10	4	1	6	1	0	0	96	12
Ipswich Town	2005–06	Championship	14	4	0	0	0	0	—		14	4
Ipswich Town	2006–07	Championship	41	16	3	1	0	0	—		44	17
Ipswich Town	2007–08	Championship	45	11	1	0	1	1	—		47	12
Ipswich Town	2008–09	Championship	3	0	0	0	1	1	—		4	1
Ipswich Town	Total		103	31	4	1	2	2	0	0	109	34
Crystal Palace	2008–09	Championship	16	3	3	0	0	0	—		19	3
Crystal Palace	2009–10	Championship	42	6	5	1	1	0	—		48	7
Crystal Palace	2010–11	Championship	3	1	0	0	1	1	—		4	2
Crystal Palace	Total		61	10	8	1	2	1	0	0	71	12
Norwich City (loan)	2008–09	Championship	7	2	0	0	0	0	—		7	2
Huddersfield Town	2010–11	League One	28	0	4	1	0	0	6 (Note: Four appearances and two goals in Football League Trophy, two appearances in Football League One play-offs)	2	38	3
Huddersfield Town	2011–12	League One	31	7	1	0	2	0	4 (Note: Two appearances in Football League Trophy, two appearances in Football League One play-offs)	0	38	7
Huddersfield Town	2012–13	Championship	21	1	3	0	1	0	—		25	2
Huddersfield Town	Total		80	8	8	1	3	0	10	2	101	11
Ipswich Town	2013–14	Championship	0	0	1	0	0	0	—		1	0
Career total			481	102	32	5	20	6	14	5	547	118

=== International ===
Appearances and goals by national team and year
National team	Year	Apps	Goals
Republic of Ireland	2003	2	0
Republic of Ireland	2004	6	0
Republic of Ireland	2006	2	0
Total		10	0

== Honours ==
Burnley

- Football League Second Division second-place promotion: 1999–2000

Rotherham United

- Football League Second Division second-place promotion: 2000–01

Huddersfield Town

- Football League One play-offs: 2012
