= 2003–04 Rotherham United F.C. season =

Rotherham United
2003–04 season
- Manager: Ronnie Moore
- First Division: 17th
- FA Cup: Third round
- League Cup: Third round
Home colours

During the 2003–04 season, Rotherham United participated in the Football League First Division.

== Season summary ==
Rotherham slumped somewhat following last season's comfortable midtable finish and ended the season in 17th, three points from the relegation zone.

== Final league table ==
Pos	Team	Pld	W	D	L	GF	GA	GD	Pts
15	Preston North End	46	15	14	17	69	71	−2	59
16	Watford	46	15	12	19	54	68	−14	57
17	Rotherham United	46	13	15	18	53	61	−8	54
18	Crewe Alexandra	46	14	11	21	57	66	−9	53
19	Burnley	46	13	14	19	60	77	−17	53

Source: Soccerway
Rules for classification: 1) points; 2) goal difference; 3) number of goals scored.

== First-team squad ==
Squad at end of season

Note: Flags indicate national team as defined under FIFA eligibility rules; some limited exceptions apply. Players may hold more than one non-FIFA nationality.

No.	Pos.	Nation	Player
1	GK	(England) ENG	Mike Pollitt
2	DF	(Scotland) SCO	Robbie Stockdale (Note: Stockdale was born in Redcar, England, and represented them at U-21 level, but also qualified to represent Scotland internationally and made his international debut for Scotland in April 2002.) (on loan from Middlesbrough)
4	DF	(England) ENG	Rob Scott
5	MF	(England) ENG	Darren Garner
6	DF	(France) FRA	Julien Baudet
7	FW	(England) ENG	Michael Proctor
8	DF	(England) ENG	Chris Swailes
9	FW	(England) ENG	Martin Butler
10	FW	(England) ENG	Paul Warne
11	MF	(England) ENG	Nick Daws
14	FW	(England) ENG	Will Hoskins
15	DF	(Scotland) SCO	Martin McIntosh
16	DF	(England) ENG	Paul Hurst

No.	Pos.	Nation	Player
17	MF	(England) ENG	John Mullin
18	DF	(England) ENG	Scott Minto
19	DF	(England) ENG	Phil Gilchrist (on loan from West Bromwich Albion)
20	MF	(England) ENG	Andy Monkhouse
21	MF	(England) ENG	Jody Morris
22	DF	(England) ENG	Shaun Barker
24	MF	(England) ENG	Chris Sedgwick
26	DF	(England) ENG	Craig Mudd
27	DF	(England) ENG	Gareth Clayton
28	DF	(England) ENG	Guy Branston
29	FW	(England) ENG	Richie Barker
30	GK	(England) ENG	Gary Montgomery

=== Left club during season ===
Note: Flags indicate national team as defined under FIFA eligibility rules; some limited exceptions apply. Players may hold more than one non-FIFA nationality.

No.	Pos.	Nation	Player
7	FW	(England) ENG	Mark Robins (to Sheffield Wednesday)
9	FW	(Republic of Ireland) IRL	Alan Lee (to Cardiff City)
12	MF	(England) ENG	Stewart Talbot (to Brentford)

No.	Pos.	Nation	Player
19	MF	(Wales) WAL	Carl Robinson (on loan from Portsmouth)
21	GK	(Australia) AUS	Brad Jones (on loan from Middlesbrough)
23	FW	(Jamaica) JAM	Darren Byfield (Note: Byfield was born in Sutton Coldfield, England, but also qualified to represent Jamaica internationally and made his international debut for Jamaica in 2003.) (to Sunderland)
