= 1995–96 Port Vale F.C. season =

Port Vale F.C.
1995–96 season
- Chairman: Bill Bell
- Manager: John Rudge
- Stadium: Vale Park
- Football League First Division: 12th (60 points)
- FA Cup: Fifth Round (eliminated by Leeds United)
- League Cup: First round (eliminated by Huddersfield Town)
- Anglo-Italian Cup: Runners-up (eliminated by Genoa)
- Player of the Year: Jon McCarthy
- Top goalscorer: League: Tony Naylor (11); All: Tony Naylor (12)
- Highest home attendance: 19,197 vs. Everton, 14 February 1996
- Lowest home attendance: 4,380 vs. Huddersfield Town, 22 August 1995
- Average home league attendance: 8,217
- Biggest win: 3–0 vs. Barnsley, 30 March 1996
- Biggest defeat: 1–5 vs. Ipswich Town, 1 January 1996
Home colours	Away colours

The 1995–96 season was Port Vale's 84th season of football in the English Football League, and second successive season in the First Division. Under manager John Rudge, the side endured a rocky start — claiming just one win in their opening ten matches — but rallied spectacularly to finish a respectable 12th in the table, ending 11 points shy of the play-offs and clear of relegation fears.

The campaign featured memorable moments, including two critical Potteries derby victories over Stoke City, both by 1–0 margins courtesy of Ian Bogie. This was a feat that would likely have handed Stoke automatic promotion had the results gone the other way. Vale also delivered a classic FA Cup giant‑killing, eliminating holders Everton 2–1 in a Fourth Round replay, earning them the Football Association's "Giantkillers" award. In cup competition, Vale advanced to the final of the Anglo-Italian Cup, ultimately finishing as runners-up after a 5–2 loss to Genoa in the final.

On the transfer front, Rudge reshaped the squad with key moves: Lee Mills arrived from Derby County (in a swap that sent Robin van der Laan the other way plus a fee of £475,000), Jon McCarthy joined from York City for a club record £500,000 and Andy Hill came from Manchester City for £200,000. Tony Naylor finished the season as top scorer with 12 goals in all competitions, closely followed by Martin Foyle, Andy Porter, and Jon McCarthy.

== Overview ==
=== First Division ===
The pre-season saw John Rudge make three key signings. He bought Lee Mills from Derby County with Robin van der Laan going in the opposite direction, with Vale receiving an additional £475,000; as well as Jon McCarthy from York City for a, still club record, £500,000; and defender Andy Hill from Manchester City for £200,000. He also signed Dutch defender Jermaine Holwijn from AFC Ajax for a £5,000 fee.

The season started terribly, as Vale won just one of their opening ten league games, failing to find the net in half of these fixtures. However, the one win during this time was against the most important of opponents, rivals Stoke City at the Victoria Ground. The derby took place on 27 August, and a crowd of 14,283 witnessed Ian Bogie score the game's only goal. Their win over Huddersfield Town at the Alfred McAlpine Stadium at the start of the October was also followed by a sequence of eight games without a win, leaving the club staring relegation in the face. In November, Canadian international defender Randy Samuel signed after impressing on trial but soon was sidelined with a serious knee injury. Meanwhile, John Jeffers left the club for Stockport County. On 9 December, Vale won 3–2 at home to Reading, their second win in a row, to move themselves off the foot of the league table.

The Vale turned a corner in December and would remain one of the division's form sides until April, losing just two league games in 19 games, picking up eleven wins. A six-game winning run concluded with a 3–0 win over Barnsley on 30 March, with captain Neil Aspin saying the team was the best he'd known during his seven years at the club. The Valiants achieved their first league double over Stoke in 71 years by winning the return fixture under the floodlights on 12 March, with Bogie again the only name on the scoresheet, this time scoring within just 12 seconds of the kick-off; BBC Radio Stoke commentator George Andrews excitedly reported that "Bogie's done the business! Five seconds into the game, the Bogie Boogie has set it alight here, and the Stokies are stunned". To Stoke, Bogie lived up to his name, as he scored his second league goal of the campaign in front of a Vale Park crowd of 16,737. Vale were facing the prospect of a promotion battle to reach the top-flight of English football, the Premier League, for the first time in their history. On 2 April, Vale came back from a two goal half-time deficit at Selhurst Park to record a 2–2 draw with Crystal Palace. However, just two wins came in the final ten games, leaving Vale to settle for a top-half finish.

They finished in twelfth place with sixty points, eleven points shy of Charlton Athletic in the play-off zone, and eight points clear of Millwall in the relegation zone. Tony Naylor was the top-scorer with twelve goals in all competitions, closely followed by Martin Foyle, Andy Porter, and Jon McCarthy.

At the end of the season, Kevin Kent retired and took up a coaching role at the club. Young winger Craig Lawton had not established himself at Vale, and so was transferred to non-League Colwyn Bay. Randy Samuel was also permitted to leave for Norwegian club Harstad IL. Bradley Sandeman was another departing player, as he was given a free transfer to Rotherham United, whilst Lee Glover also joined the "Millers" for a £150,000 fee.

=== Finances ===
The club's shirt sponsors were Tunstall Assurance. Season ticket sales hit the 5,000 mark for the first time in the club's history.

=== Cup competitions ===
In the FA Cup, Vale faced a difficult tie against Crystal Palace. After a goalless draw at Selhurst Park, the Vale advanced with a 4–3 win thanks to a brace from Ray Walker, despite having twice surrendered a two-goal lead. They then faced the cup holders Everton at Goodison Park. Foyle equalized after the "Toffees" scored the opener, and Ian Bogie saved the day with a deflected goal in injury time after Everton had again taken the lead through Duncan Ferguson. This goal saved the blushes of Foyle, who missed a sitter from 6 yards (5.5 m) earlier in the game, and Paul Musselwhite, who gifted Ferguson his goal when he spilt Anders Limpar's cross. Back at Vale Park, the "Valiants" added another scalp to their collection with goals from Bogie and McCarthy to win the match 2–1. The club also took in their highest ever gate receipt total, as the game saw Vale bank £170,349. They then faced another top side away in the fifth round, Leeds United at Elland Road. A goalless draw raised hopes of another cup upset, and hopes turned to expectations as Naylor put Vale ahead in the replay. However, two goals from Gary McAllister saved United's blushes, dumping Vale out of the cup. For their efforts, John Rudge's side were handed the FA's Giantkillers award for the season.

In the League Cup, Vale faced league rivals Huddersfield Town. Despite a 2–1 victory at the Alfred McAlpine Stadium, the "Terriers" escaped from Burslem with a 3–1 victory to knock Vale out of the competition.

In the Anglo-Italian Cup, Vale drew 2–2 with Cesena, beat Ancona 2–0, and drew 0–0 with Genoa, before beating Perugia 5–3. The draw with nine-time Serie A champions and former UEFA Cup semi-finalists Genoa was seen as particularly creditable, with Musselwhite praised for some excellent close-range saves to earn his clean sheet. Meanwhile, the win over Perugia took place at the Stadio Renato Curi in front of only 19 Vale supporting away fans as very heavy snow in Northern Italy left many fans who had travelled unable to reach the city of Perugia; those who did see the game witnessed a Mills hat-trick in what was a highly entertaining match. Vale qualified past the group stage, along with Birmingham City, as they finished ahead of both Oldham Athletic and Luton Town. Facing Ipswich Town in the English semi-final, they progressed with a 4–2 win. To reach the final, they still had to beat West Bromwich Albion in a two-legged affair. They beat the "Baggies" 3–1 to become the last English team in the competition and face Genoa again, this time to decide the tournament's winner. Despite a brace from Foyle, the Serie B side were the 5–2 victors, former Italian international Gennaro Ruotolo scoring a hat-trick.

== Results ==
=== Football League First Division ===
==== League table ====
Pos	Team	Pld	W	D	L	GF	GA	GD	Pts
10	Barnsley	46	14	18	14	60	66	−6	60
11	West Bromwich Albion	46	16	12	18	60	68	−8	60
12	Port Vale	46	15	15	16	59	66	−7	60
13	Tranmere Rovers	46	14	17	15	64	60	+4	59
14	Southend United	46	15	14	17	52	61	−9	59

Rules for classification: 1) Points; 2) Goals scored; 3) Goal difference

==== Results by matchday ====
Round	1	2	3	4	5	6	7	8	9	10	11	12	13	14	15	16	17	18	19	20	21	22	23	24	25	26	27	28	29	30	31	32	33	34	35	36	37	38	39	40	41	42	43	44	45	46
Ground	A	H	A	H	A	H	H	A	A	H	A	H	A	H	A	H	H	A	A	H	H	A	A	H	A	A	H	A	A	A	H	H	H	H	A	H	A	A	H	A	H	H	H	H	A	A
Result	D	L	W	D	L	L	L	L	D	D	W	L	D	L	D	L	D	L	D	W	W	W	L	W	L	W	D	D	D	D	W	W	W	W	W	W	D	L	L	L	W	D	W	L	L	D
Position	14	22	18	18	20	22	24	24	23	24	23	23	22	24	23	24	24	24	24	24	20	21	21	18	19	18	19	21	12	23	23	19	17	17	14	12	11	12	16	17	10	12	9	10	11	12
Points	1	1	4	5	5	5	5	5	6	7	10	10	11	11	12	12	13	13	14	17	20	23	23	26	26	29	30	31	32	33	36	39	42	45	48	51	52	52	52	52	55	56	59	59	59	60

Source: Statto
A = Away; H = Home; W = Win; D = Draw; L = Loss

==== Matches ====
13 August 1995 1	Derby County	0–0	Port Vale	Derby
		Report		Stadium: Baseball Ground; Attendance: 10,869

19 August 1995 2	Port Vale	0–1	Millwall	Burslem
		Report	Dixon	Stadium: Vale Park; Attendance: 8,202

27 August 1995 3	Stoke City	0–1	Port Vale	Stoke-upon-Trent
		Report	Bogie	Stadium: Victoria Ground; Attendance: 14,283

30 August 1995 4	Port Vale	1–1	Sunderland	Burslem
	Porter 2'	Report	Gray 51'	Stadium: Vale Park; Attendance: 7,693; Referee: John Kirkby

2 September 1995 5	Norwich City	2–1	Port Vale	Norwich
	Johnson; Fleck	Report	Mills	Stadium: Carrow Road; Attendance: 13,908

9 September 1995 6	Port Vale	0–2	Portsmouth	Burslem
		Report	Burton; Griffiths (pen.)	Stadium: Vale Park; Attendance: 7,374

12 September 1995 7	Port Vale	0–2	Leicester City	Burslem
		Report	Roberts; McMahon	Stadium: Vale Park; Attendance: 8,814

16 September 1995 8	Grimsby Town	1–0	Port Vale	Cleethorpes
	Livingstone	Report		Stadium: Blundell Park; Attendance: 4,066

23 September 1995 9	Reading	2–2	Port Vale	Reading, Berkshire
		Report	L.Glover; Mills	Stadium: Elm Park; Attendance: 7,819

30 September 1995 10	Port Vale	2–2	Wolverhampton Wanderers	Burslem
	Richards 37' (og.); Porter 61' (pen.)	Report	Daley 16'; Goodman 31'	Stadium: Vale Park; Attendance: 11,550; Referee: Uriah Rennie

7 October 1995 11	Huddersfield Town	0–2	Port Vale	Huddersfield
		Report	Guppy; McCarthy	Stadium: Kirklees Stadium; Attendance: 11,335

15 October 1995 12	Port Vale	1–2	Crystal Palace	Burslem
	L.Glover	Report	Gordon; Freedman	Stadium: Vale Park; Attendance: 6,935

21 October 1995 13	Barnsley	1–1	Port Vale	Barnsley
	Archdeacon	Report	Guppy	Stadium: Oakwell; Attendance: 7,332

29 October 1995 14	Port Vale	1–2	Birmingham City	Burslem
	Porter (pen.)	Report	Tait; Claridge	Stadium: Vale Park; Attendance: 8,875

5 November 1995 15	Oldham Athletic	2–2	Port Vale	Oldham
	Richardson (pen.); Wilkinson	Report	Mills	Stadium: Boundary Park; Attendance: 5,138

11 November 1995 16	Port Vale	2–3	Sheffield United	Burslem
	Mills; Naylor	Report	Hodges; Blake	Stadium: Vale Park; Attendance: 7,284

18 November 1995 17	Port Vale	1–1	Watford	Burslem
	Samuel	Report	Ramage	Stadium: Vale Park; Attendance: 6,265

22 November 1995 18	Tranmere Rovers	2–1	Port Vale	Prenton
	Aldridge	Report	Naylor	Stadium: Prenton Park; Attendance: 6,681

25 November 1995 19	Charlton Athletic	2–2	Port Vale	Charlton, London
	Bowyer; Mortimer (pen.)	Report	Griffiths; Porter	Stadium: The Valley; Attendance: 10,174

2 December 1995 20	Port Vale	1–0	Huddersfield Town	Burslem
	Foyle	Report		Stadium: Vale Park; Attendance: 7,701

9 December 1995 21	Port Vale	3–2	Reading	Burslem
	Foyle; Guppy; Porter	Report	Quinn (pen.); Morley	Stadium: Vale Park; Attendance: 6,376

16 December 1995 22	Wolverhampton Wanderers	0–1	Port Vale	Wolverhampton
		Report	Porter 6'	Stadium: Molineux Stadium; Attendance: 23,329; Referee: J Kirby

20 December 1995 23	Southend United	2–1	Port Vale	Southend-on-Sea
	Marsh	Report	Naylor	Stadium: Roots Hall; Attendance: 4,506

26 December 1995 24	Port Vale	3–1	West Bromwich Albion	Burslem
	Foyle; Guppy; Naylor	Report	Gilbert	Stadium: Vale Park; Attendance: 10,807

1 January 1996 25	Ipswich Town	5–1	Port Vale	Ipswich
	Marshall; Milton; Mathie; Sedgley	Report	Naylor	Stadium: Portman Road; Attendance: 9,926

13 January 1996 26	Millwall	1–2	Port Vale	Bermondsey, Southwark
	Rae	Report	Foyle; Naylor	Stadium: The Den; Attendance: 14,220

20 January 1996 27	Port Vale	1–1	Derby County	Burslem
	Naylor	Report	Sturridge	Stadium: Vale Park; Attendance: 11,947

10 February 1996 28	Sunderland	0–0	Port Vale	Sunderland
		Report		Stadium: Roker Park; Attendance: 15,954; Referee: Mike Riley

17 February 1996 29	Leicester City	1–1	Port Vale	Leicester
	Taylor	Report	McCarthy	Stadium: Filbert Street; Attendance: 13,758

2 March 1996 30	West Bromwich Albion	1–1	Port Vale	West Bromwich
	Taylor	Report	McCarthy	Stadium: The Hawthorns; Attendance: 13,707

9 March 1996 31	Port Vale	2–1	Southend United	Burslem
	L.Glover; McCarthy	Report	Boere	Stadium: Vale Park; Attendance: 6,222

12 March 1996 32	Port Vale	1–0	Stoke City	Burslem
	Bogie	Report		Stadium: Vale Park; Attendance: 16,737

20 March 1996 33	Port Vale	1–0	Norwich City	Burslem
	Foyle	Report		Stadium: Vale Park; Attendance: 6,085

23 March 1996 34	Port Vale	2–1	Ipswich Town	Burslem
	Bogie; McCarthy	Report	Marshall	Stadium: Vale Park; Attendance: 7,277

27 March 1996 35	Portsmouth	1–2	Port Vale	Portsmouth
	Allen	Report	Griffiths; Naylor	Stadium: Fratton Park; Attendance: 6,335

30 March 1996 36	Port Vale	3–0	Barnsley	Burslem
	Foyle; Naylor; Porter	Report		Stadium: Vale Park; Attendance: 7,358

2 April 1996 37	Crystal Palace	2–2	Port Vale	Selhurst, Croydon
	Freedman	Report	Foyle; McCarthy	Stadium: Selhurst Park; Attendance: 14,180

6 April 1996 38	Birmingham City	3–1	Port Vale	Birmingham
	Tait; Barnes; Peschisolido	Report	Porter	Stadium: St Andrew's; Attendance: 17,469

8 April 1996 39	Port Vale	1–3	Oldham Athletic	Burslem
	Mills	Report	Richardson (pen.); Barlow; Beckford	Stadium: Vale Park; Attendance: 7,796

13 April 1996 40	Watford	5–2	Port Vale	Watford
	White; Connolly	Report	Foyle; Porter (pen.)	Stadium: Vicarage Road; Attendance: 9,066

16 April 1996 41	Port Vale	1–0	Grimsby Town	Burslem
	Aspin	Report		Stadium: Vale Park; Attendance: 5,796

20 April 1996 42	Port Vale	1–1	Tranmere Rovers	Burslem
	Naylor	Report	O'Brien	Stadium: Vale Park; Attendance: 7,419

23 April 1996 43	Port Vale	1–0	Luton Town	Burslem
	Mills	Report	Newton; Balmer; Allen	Stadium: Vale Park; Attendance: 6,054

27 April 1996 44	Port Vale	1–3	Charlton Athletic	Burslem
	McCarthy	Report		Stadium: Vale Park; Attendance: 8,428

30 April 1996 45	Luton Town	3–2	Port Vale	Luton
		Report	Mills; Porter	Stadium: Kenilworth Road; Attendance: 5,443

4 May 1996 46	Sheffield United	1–1	Port Vale	Sheffield
	Walker	Report	Naylor	Stadium: Bramall Lane; Attendance: 18,741

=== FA Cup ===
6 January 1996 R3	Crystal Palace	0–0	Port Vale	Selhurst, Croydon
		Report		Stadium: Selhurst Park; Attendance: 10,456

16 January 1996 Replay	Port Vale	4–3 (a.e.t.)	Crystal Palace	Burslem
	Walker; Foyle; Porter	Report	Cox; Dyer; Taylor	Stadium: Vale Park; Attendance: 6,754

27 January 1996 R4	Everton	2–2	Port Vale	Walton, Liverpool
15:00 GMT	Amokachi 39'; Ferguson 88'	Report	Foyle 59'; Bogie 89'	Stadium: Goodison Park; Attendance: 33,168; Referee: Mike Reed

14 February 1996 Replay	Port Vale	2–1	Everton	Burslem
19:45 GMT	Bogie 17'; McCarthy 69'	Report	Stuart 32'	Stadium: Vale Park; Attendance: 19,197; Referee: Mike Reed

21 February 1996 R5	Leeds United	0–0	Port Vale	Beeston, Leeds
		Report		Stadium: Elland Road; Attendance: 18,607

27 February 1996 Replay	Port Vale	1–2	Leeds United	Burslem
	Naylor 37'	Report	McAllister 64', 89'	Stadium: Vale Park; Attendance: 14,023

=== League Cup ===
15 August 1995 R1 1st Leg	Huddersfield Town	1–2	Port Vale	Huddersfield
	Collins; Sedgley (pen.)	Report	Sedgley (og.)	Stadium: Kirklees Stadium; Attendance: 5,363

22 August 1995 R1 2nd Leg	Port Vale	1–3 (4–3 agg.)	Huddersfield Town	Burslem
	L.Glover	Report	Booth; Bullock	Stadium: Vale Park; Attendance: 4,380

=== Anglo-Italian Cup ===
5 September 1995 Group stage	(Italy) Cesena	2–2	Port Vale	Cesena
		Report		Stadium: Stadio Dino Manuzzi; Attendance: 820

11 October 1995 Group stage	Port Vale	2–0	Ancona (Italy)	Burslem
		Report		Stadium: Vale Park; Attendance: 3,440

8 November 1995 Group stage	Port Vale	0–0	Genoa (Italy)	Burslem
		Report		Stadium: Vale Park; Attendance: 3,282

13 December 1995 Group stage	(Italy) Perugia	3–5	Port Vale	Perugia
		Report		Stadium: Stadio Renato Curi; Attendance: 200

23 January 1996 Regional Semi-final	Ipswich Town	2–4	Port Vale	Ipswich
	Gregory; Mason	Report		Stadium: Portman Road; Attendance: 5,831

24 February 1996 Regional Final First leg	West Bromwich Albion	0–0	Port Vale	West Bromwich
		Report		Stadium: The Hawthorns; Attendance: 10,862

5 March 1996 Regional Final Second leg	West Bromwich Albion	1–3 (1–3 agg.)	Port Vale	West Bromwich
		Report		Stadium: The Hawthorns; Attendance: 7,640

17 March 1996 Final	(Italy) Genoa	5–2	Port Vale	London
17 March 1996	Ruotolo 12', 54', 66'; Galante 21'; Montella 39'	Report	Foyle 68', 82'	Stadium: Wembley Stadium; Attendance: 12,683

== Squad statistics ==
=== Appearances and goals ===
Key to positions: GK – Goalkeeper; DF – Defender; MF – Midfielder; FW – Forward

No.	Pos	Nat	Player	Total		First Division		FA Cup		Other	
No.	Pos	Nat	Player	Apps	Goals	Apps	Goals	Apps	Goals	Apps	Goals
	GK	(England) ENG	Paul Musselwhite	53	0	39	0	6	0	8	0
	GK	(Netherlands) NED	Arjan van Heusden	9	0	7	0	0	0	2	0
	DF	(England) ENG	Neil Aspin	30	1	22	1	4	0	4	0
	DF	(England) ENG	Dean Glover	35	0	29	0	2	0	4	0
	DF	(England) ENG	Gareth Griffiths	53	2	41	2	4	0	8	0
	DF	(England) ENG	Andy Hill	47	0	35	0	6	0	6	0
	DF	(Canada) CAN	Randy Samuel	10	1	9	1	0	0	1	0
	DF	(England) ENG	Bradley Sandeman	2	0	1	0	0	0	1	0
	DF	(England) ENG	Dean Stokes	26	0	18	0	0	0	8	0
	DF	(England) ENG	Allen Tankard	43	0	29	0	6	0	8	0
	MF	(England) ENG	Ian Bogie	48	5	32	3	6	2	10	0
	MF	(England) ENG	Wayne Corden	2	0	2	0	0	0	0	0
	MF	(England) ENG	Steve Guppy	60	5	44	4	6	0	10	1
	MF	(England) ENG	Kevin Kent	1	0	1	0	0	0	0	0
	MF	(Wales) WAL	Craig Lawton	4	0	2	0	0	0	2	0
	MF	(Northern Ireland) NIR	Jon McCarthy	61	10	45	7	6	1	10	2
	MF	(England) ENG	Andy Porter	61	12	45	10	6	1	10	1
	MF	(England) ENG	Stewart Talbot	28	0	20	0	3	0	5	0
	MF	(England) ENG	Ray Walker	47	2	35	0	6	2	6	0
	FW	(England) ENG	Martin Foyle	34	14	25	8	4	2	5	4
	FW	(Scotland) SCO	Lee Glover	32	6	24	3	0	0	8	3
	FW	(England) ENG	Tony Naylor	51	15	39	11	6	1	6	3
	FW	(England) ENG	Lee Mills	42	13	32	8	2	0	8	5

=== Top scorers ===
Place	Position	Nation	Name	First Division	FA Cup	League Cup	Anglo-Italian Cup	Total
1	FW	England	Tony Naylor	11	1	0	3	15
2	FW	England	Martin Foyle	8	2	0	4	14
3	FW	Northern Ireland	Jon McCarthy	7	1	0	2	11
–	MF	England	Andy Porter	10	1	0	1	11
–	FW	England	Lee Mills	8	0	0	5	11
6	MF	England	Ian Bogie	3	2	0	0	5
–	FW	Scotland	Lee Glover	3	0	1	2	6
–	MF	England	Steve Guppy	4	0	0	1	5
9	DF	England	Gareth Griffiths	2	0	0	0	2
–	MF	England	Ray Walker	0	2	0	0	2
11	DF	England	Neil Aspin	1	0	0	0	1
–	DF	Canada	Randy Samuel	1	0	0	0	1
–		–	Own goals	1	0	1	0	2
			TOTALS	59	9	2	18	88

== Transfers ==
=== Transfers in ===
Date from	Position	Nationality	Name	From	Fee	Ref.
May 1995	DF	NED	Jermaine Holwijn	(Netherlands) AFC Ajax	£5,000	
July 1995	FW	ENG	Lee Mills	Derby County	Exchange	
August 1995	DF	ENG	Andy Hill	Manchester City	£150,000	
August 1995	MF	NIR	Jon McCarthy	York City	£450,000	
November 1995	DF	CAN	Randy Samuel	(Netherlands) Fortuna Sittard	Free transfer	

=== Transfers out ===
Date from	Position	Nationality	Name	To	Fee	Ref.
November 1995	MF	ENG	John Jeffers	Stockport County	Free transfer	
May 1996	MF	WAL	Craig Lawton	(Wales) Colwyn Bay	Free transfer	
May 1996	DF	CAN	Randy Samuel	(Norway) Harstad IL	Released	
May 1996	DF	ENG	Bradley Sandeman	Rotherham United	Free transfer	
15 August 1996	FW	ENG	Lee Glover	Rotherham United	£150,000	
Summer 1996	MF	ENG	Kevin Kent	Retired		
