= 1994–95 Port Vale F.C. season =

Port Vale F.C.
1994–95 season
- Chairman: Bill Bell
- Manager: John Rudge
- Stadium: Vale Park
- Football League First Division: 17th (58 points)
- FA Cup: Second Round (eliminated by Scarborough)
- League Cup: Second Round (eliminated by Manchester United)
- Player of the Year: Martin Foyle
- Top goalscorer: League: Martin Foyle (16); All: Martin Foyle (20)
- Highest home attendance: 19,510 vs. Stoke City, 14 March 1995
- Lowest home attendance: 4,728 vs. Bristol Rovers, 23 August 1994
- Average home league attendance: 9,218
- Biggest win: 6–0 vs. Hartlepool United, 12 November 1994
- Biggest defeat: 0–3 and 1–4
Home colours	Away colours

The 1994–95 season was Port Vale's 83rd season of football in the English Football League, and first ever season in the First Division following their promotion from the Second Division. Under the stewardship of manager John Rudge and chairman Bill Bell, Vale secured survival, finishing safely above the relegation zone in 17th with 58 points.

Cup competition brought mixed fortunes: in the FA Cup, Vale recorded a resounding 6–0 win over Hartlepool United before suffering a shock exit to Scarborough in the Second Round. In the League Cup, they reached the Second Round, where they were knocked out by Manchester United. Martin Foyle enjoyed another standout year — bagging 16 league goals and 20 in all competitions, earning him the Player of the Year award. Vale also marked their return to the same division as Potteries derby rivals Stoke City, claiming bragging rights with a 1–1 draw at Vale Park and a 1–0 win at the Victoria Ground.

Support from the terraces remained healthy: the highest home attendance was 19,510 for the derby against Stoke City, while the lowest was 4,728 against Bristol Rovers; the average home league attendance stood at 9,218. Their biggest win came in that 6–0 thrashing of Hartlepool, and their heaviest defeats were scorelines of 3–0 and 4–1. The season also saw the arrival of exciting new players Tony Naylor, Steve Guppy, and Ian Bogie, following the high‑profile sale of Ian Taylor before the campaign began.

Vale steadied themselves in the First Division with resilience and goals from Foyle, marked by new signings and derby pride, setting a solid foundation in the second tier.

== Overview ==
=== First Division ===
The pre-season saw John Rudge spend a small amount of the money received on the sales of Ian Taylor and Peter Swan to bring Tony Naylor to the club from Crewe Alexandra for a £150,000 fee. A further £200,000 was splashed out on Nottingham Forest forward Lee Glover. Another £4,500 was spent on Dutch goalkeeper Arjan van Heusden from VV Noordwijk. Arriving on free transfers were Craig Lawton (Manchester United) and Stewart Talbot (Moor Green).

The season started modestly, with two wins in the four August games. In September, only Lee Glover, Tony Naylor and Martin Foyle could find the net, but the Vale won six points from their five games. To help with his recovery from a serious injury, Ray Walker spent some time on loan at Cambridge United, and won back his first-team place in the Vale starting eleven upon his return. Meanwhile, Tony Kelly arrived at the club from Bolton Wanderers, but after a brief spell, moved on to Millwall. On 17 September, Vale inflicted a 2–1 defeat on league leaders Middlesbrough player-manager Bryan Robson – his first loss in management. Vale's attack was highlighted in October. However, the defence ensured three draws from five games.

In November, Darren Hughes was allowed to leave the club for Northampton Town. On 5 November, Vale lost all their inhibitions in front of goal, beating Southend United 5–0 with five different scorers. Rudge decided to make another big signing and bought winger Steve Guppy from Newcastle United for £225,000. Two days later, on 26 November, Guppy made his debut in a 2–1 win over Millwall, where he collected assists for both goals. However, their draw with Swindon Town would prove to be the only point gained in December, as Vale were stuck in a relegation dogfight. John Jeffers spent January on loan at Shrewsbury Town. During this spell, defender Kevin Scott arrived on loan from Tottenham Hotspur. The team gelled, forming a five-game unbeaten run based on just two goals conceded to shoot up the table. In March, midfielder Ian Bogie was signed from Leyton Orient for a £50,000 fee.

Potteries derby day finally came on 14 March, and 19,510 turned up at Vale Park to witness a 1–1 draw with Stoke City, Naylor scoring Vale's goal. Five defeats in seven games followed, raising concerns about the drop. However, the Vale were unbeaten in their final five games to ensure safety. This included a 3–3 draw at Elm Park that saw the "Valiants" come from three goals down to claim a point. It also included a 1–0 win over Stoke at the Victoria Ground on 22 April, Foyle scoring the goal in what was Vale's first away win over Stoke in a league fixture since 1927.

They finished in 17th place with 58 points, leaving them ten points clear of relegated Swindon Town. They were five points short of Stoke, who finished six places above the Vale. Player of the Year Martin Foyle bagged twenty goals, double that of his nearest rival, Tony Naylor.

At the end of the season Ollie Heald, Peter Billing, Mark Burke and John Burndred were released, who signed with Scarborough, Hartlepool United, Fortuna Sittard and Stafford Rangers respectively. Joe Allon was also sold to Brentford for £42,500.

=== Finances ===
The club's shirt sponsors were Tunstall Assurance.

=== Cup competitions ===
As members of the second tier, Vale should have qualified for the third round of the FA Cup, but were forced to take part in the first round to make up the numbers after Aldershot went bust and Maidstone United resigned from the league. Vale went on to easily beat Third Division side Hartlepool United 6–0 in Burslem, with Martin Foyle bagging a hat-trick. Remarkably, this would be the last hat-trick scored by a Vale player at Vale Park until April 2011. However, a shock awaited in the second round, where Scarborough, also of the fourth tier, beat the Vale 1–0 at the McCain Stadium.

In the League Cup, Vale advanced past Second Division Bristol Rovers 4–2 on aggregate, having won 3–1 at the Memorial Stadium. They faced Premier League Manchester United in the second round. Alex Ferguson's "Red Devils" beat John Rudge's "Valiants" 2–1 at Vale Park in front of 18,605 supporters; Lee Glover scored for Vale, and Paul Scholes scored a brace on his United debut. Vale fans were disappointed to witness the then-unknown United reserves at the time. However, Scholes would go on to become a household name, as would teenage teammates Gary Neville, Nicky Butt, and David Beckham; the United first XI would go on to win a combined total of more than 500 international caps throughout their careers. For the second leg there were 31,615 fans at Old Trafford to witness a 2–0 United victory, David May and Brian McClair getting the goals.

== Results ==
=== Football League First Division ===
==== League table ====
Pos	Team	Pld	W	D	L	GF	GA	GD	Pts
15	Charlton Athletic	46	16	11	19	58	66	−8	59
16	Luton Town	46	15	13	18	61	64	−3	58
17	Port Vale	46	15	13	18	58	64	−6	58
18	Portsmouth	46	15	13	18	53	63	−10	58
19	West Bromwich Albion	46	16	10	20	51	57	−6	58

Rules for classification: 1) Points; 2) Goals scored; 3) Goal difference

==== Results by matchday ====
Round	1	2	3	4	5	6	7	8	9	10	11	12	13	14	15	16	17	18	19	20	21	22	23	24	25	26	27	28	29	30	31	32	33	34	35	36	37	38	39	40	41	42	43	44	45	46
Ground	A	H	A	H	H	A	A	H	H	A	A	H	H	A	A	H	A	H	H	A	A	H	H	A	H	A	A	H	H	H	A	A	H	H	A	H	A	A	H	A	H	A	H	A	A	H
Result	L	W	D	W	L	W	L	W	L	L	D	L	D	D	D	W	L	W	D	L	L	D	L	L	W	W	D	W	W	L	D	L	W	D	L	W	L	L	L	W	L	D	W	W	D	D
Position	22	11	10	7	12	4	6	7	8	11	15	18	18	20	20	14	18	17	14	16	17	18	21	22	21	18	20	17	15	18	17	17	15	15	17	14	17	17	17	16	17	17	16	14	17	17
Points	0	3	4	7	7	10	10	13	13	13	14	14	15	16	17	20	20	23	24	24	24	25	25	25	28	31	32	35	38	38	39	39	42	43	43	46	46	46	46	49	49	50	53	56	57	58

Source: Statto
A = Away; H = Home; W = Win; D = Draw; L = Loss

==== Matches ====
14 August 1994 1	Swindon Town	2–0	Port Vale	Swindon
	Fjørtoft 22'; Scott 80'	Report		Stadium: County Ground; Attendance: 10,431; Referee: M. Pierce

20 August 1994 2	Port Vale	3–1	Oldham Athletic	Burslem
	Foyle; Kenny (og.); Naylor	Report	Sharp	Stadium: Vale Park; Attendance: 10,051

27 August 1994 3	Bristol City	0–0	Port Vale	Ashton Gate, Bristol
		Report		Stadium: Ashton Gate; Attendance: 8,588

30 August 1994 4	Port Vale	2–1	Barnsley	Burslem
	Burke; L.Glover	Report	O'Connell	Stadium: Vale Park; Attendance: 7,228

3 September 1994 5	Port Vale	0–1	Luton Town	Burslem
		Report	Marshall	Stadium: Vale Park; Attendance: 8,541

10 September 1994 6	Portsmouth	0–2	Port Vale	Portsmouth
		Report	L.Glover; Naylor	Stadium: Fratton Park; Attendance: 8,989

13 September 1994 7	Grimsby Town	4–1	Port Vale	Cleethorpes
	Gilbert; Woods; Mendonca	Report	Foyle	Stadium: Blundell Park; Attendance: 3,216

17 September 1994 8	Port Vale	2–1	Middlesbrough	Burslem
	L.Glover; Naylor	Report	Pollock	Stadium: Vale Park; Attendance: 10,313

24 September 1994 9	Port Vale	0–2	Sheffield United	Burslem
		Report	Blake; Whitehouse (pen.)	Stadium: Vale Park; Attendance: 9,324

1 October 1994 10	Wolverhampton Wanderers	2–1	Port Vale	Wolverhampton
	Thompson 51' (pen.), 79' (pen.)	Report	Allon 82'	Stadium: Molineux Stadium; Attendance: 27,649; Referee: Eddie Wolstenholme

8 October 1994 11	Notts County	2–2	Port Vale	Nottingham
	Agana; Williams	Report	Foyle; Kelly	Stadium: Meadow Lane; Attendance: 6,903

15 October 1994 12	Port Vale	0–2	Charlton Athletic	Burslem
		Report	Whyte; Chapple	Stadium: Vale Park; Attendance: 7,707

22 October 1994 13	Port Vale	1–1	Bolton Wanderers	Burslem
	Allon	Report		Stadium: Vale Park; Attendance: 10,003

29 October 1994 14	Tranmere Rovers	1–1	Port Vale	Prenton
	Morrissey	Report	Jeffers	Stadium: Prenton Park; Attendance: 6,972

2 November 1994 15	West Bromwich Albion	0–0	Port Vale	West Bromwich
		Report		Stadium: The Hawthorns; Attendance: 14,513

5 November 1994 16	Port Vale	5–0	Southend United	Burslem
	Allon; Foyle; Porter; Walker van der Laan	Report		Stadium: Vale Park; Attendance: 7,141

19 November 1994 17	Derby County	2–0	Port Vale	Derby
	Johnson	Report		Stadium: Baseball Ground; Attendance: 13,357

26 November 1994 18	Port Vale	2–1	Millwall	Burslem
	Allon; Burke	Report	Kennedy	Stadium: Vale Park; Attendance: 8,016

29 November 1994 19	Port Vale	0–0	Sunderland	Burslem
		Report		Stadium: Vale Park; Attendance: 8,121; Referee: John Brandwood

6 December 1994 20	Bolton Wanderers	1–0	Port Vale	Bolton
	Patterson	Report		Stadium: Burnden Park; Attendance: 10,324

10 December 1994 21	Oldham Athletic	3–2	Port Vale	Oldham
	Ritchie	Report	Guppy van der Laan	Stadium: Boundary Park; Attendance: 7,712

17 December 1994 22	Port Vale	2–2	Swindon Town	Burslem
	Foyle 11', 59'	Report	Taylor 26'; Fjørtoft 51'	Stadium: Vale Park; Attendance: 7,747; Referee: Eddie Wolstenholme

28 December 1994 23	Port Vale	0–2	Reading	Burslem
		Report	Taylor; Quinn	Stadium: Vale Park; Attendance: 7,891

31 December 1994 24	Watford	3–2	Port Vale	Watford
	Foster; Ramage; Musselwhite (og.)	Report	Foyle	Stadium: Vicarage Road; Attendance: 7,794

15 January 1995 25	Port Vale	2–0	Tranmere Rovers	Burslem
	Foyle; Tankard	Report		Stadium: Vale Park; Attendance: 7,944

28 January 1995 26	Southend United	1–2	Port Vale	Southend-on-Sea
	Thomson	Report	Foyle van der Laan	Stadium: Roots Hall; Attendance: 3,619

4 February 1995 27	Sunderland	1–1	Port Vale	Sunderland
	Ball 24'	Report	Naylor 36'	Stadium: Roker Park; Attendance: 13,377; Referee: Alan Flood

11 February 1995 28	Port Vale	1–0	West Bromwich Albion	Burslem
	Guppy	Report		Stadium: Vale Park; Attendance: 10,751

21 February 1995 29	Port Vale	1–0	Derby County	Burslem
	Kent	Report		Stadium: Vale Park; Attendance: 9,387

25 February 1995 30	Port Vale	2–4	Wolverhampton Wanderers	Burslem
	Naylor 18'; Kent 56'	Report	de Wolf 2', 42' (pen.), 68'; Bull 45'	Stadium: Vale Park; Attendance: 13,676; Referee: J Lloyd

4 March 1995 31	Sheffield United	1–1	Port Vale	Sheffield
	Veart	Report	L.Glover	Stadium: Bramall Lane; Attendance: 13,647

7 March 1995 32	Luton Town	2–1	Port Vale	Luton
	Dixon; Telfer	Report	Porter	Stadium: Kenilworth Road; Attendance: 5,947

11 March 1995 33	Port Vale	2–1	Bristol City	Burslem
	Naylor; Scott	Report	Owers	Stadium: Vale Park; Attendance: 7,646

14 March 1995 34	Port Vale	1–1	Stoke City	Burslem
	Naylor	Report	Sandford 33'	Stadium: Vale Park; Attendance: 19,510

18 March 1995 35	Barnsley	3–1	Port Vale	Barnsley
	Sheridan; Liddell	Report	Allon	Stadium: Oakwell; Attendance: 6,878

21 March 1995 36	Port Vale	1–0	Portsmouth	Burslem
	Allon	Report		Stadium: Vale Park; Attendance: 7,388

26 March 1995 37	Middlesbrough	3–0	Port Vale	Middlesbrough
	Fuchs; Vickers; Robson	Report		Stadium: Ayresome Park; Attendance: 17,401

28 March 1995 38	Burnley	4–3	Port Vale	Burnley
	Nogan 45'; Randall 60'; Shaw 64'; Sandeman 64' (og.)	Report	Foyle; Allon	Stadium: Turf Moor; Attendance: 10,058

1 April 1995 39	Port Vale	1–2	Grimsby Town	Burslem
	Naylor	Report	Laws; Livingstone	Stadium: Vale Park; Attendance: 7,150

5 April 1995 40	Millwall	1–3	Port Vale	Bermondsey, Southwark
	Oldfield	Report	Bogie; Foyle van der Laan	Stadium: The Den; Attendance: 5,260

8 April 1995 41	Port Vale	0–1	Watford	Burslem
		Report	Porter	Stadium: Vale Park; Attendance: 7,276

15 April 1995 42	Reading	3–3	Port Vale	Reading, Berkshire
	Nogan	Report	Bogie; Naylor; Porter	Stadium: Elm Park; Attendance: 8,635

17 April 1995 43	Port Vale	1–0	Burnley	Burslem
	van der Laan 40'	Report		Stadium: Vale Park; Attendance: 9,663

22 April 1995 44	Stoke City	0–1	Port Vale	Stoke-upon-Trent
		Report	Foyle	Stadium: Victoria Ground; Attendance: 20,429

29 April 1995 45	Charlton Athletic	1–1	Port Vale	Charlton, London
	Brown	Report	Foyle	Stadium: The Valley; Attendance: 12,596

7 May 1995 46	Port Vale	1–1	Notts County	Burslem
	Foyle	Report	McSwegan	Stadium: Vale Park; Attendance: 9,542

=== FA Cup ===
12 November 1994 R1	Port Vale	6–0	Hartlepool United	Burslem
	Allon 38'; D.Glover 69'; Griffiths; Foyle 44', 68', 80'	Report		Stadium: Vale Park; Attendance: 6,199; Referee: Steve Lodge

3 December 1994 R2	Scarborough	1–0	Port Vale	Scarborough, North Yorkshire
	Swann	Report		Stadium: Athletic Ground; Attendance: 2,382

=== League Cup ===
17 August 1994 R1 1st Leg	Bristol Rovers	1–3	Port Vale	Bath, Somerset
	Tillson	Report	Foyle; L.Glover; Naylor	Stadium: Twerton Park; Attendance: 3,307

23 August 1994 R1 2nd Leg	Port Vale	1–1 (4–2 agg.)	Bristol Rovers	Burslem
	L.Glover	Report	Stewart	Stadium: Vale Park; Attendance: 4,728

21 September 1994 R2 1st Leg	Port Vale	1–2	Manchester United	Burslem
	L.Glover	Report	Scholes 36', 53'	Stadium: Vale Park; Attendance: 18,605

5 October 1994 R2 2nd Leg	Manchester United	2–0 (4–1 agg.)	Port Vale	Old Trafford
	McClair 35'; May 61'	Report		Stadium: Old Trafford; Attendance: 31,615

== Squad statistics ==
=== Appearances and goals ===
Key to positions: GK – Goalkeeper; DF – Defender; MF – Midfielder; FW – Forward

No.	Pos	Nat	Player	Total		First Division		FA Cup		Other	
No.	Pos	Nat	Player	Apps	Goals	Apps	Goals	Apps	Goals	Apps	Goals
	GK	(England) ENG	Paul Musselwhite	50	0	44	0	2	0	4	0
	GK	(Netherlands) NED	Arjan van Heusden	2	0	2	0	0	0	0	0
	DF	(England) ENG	Neil Aspin	40	0	37	0	2	0	1	0
	DF	(England) ENG	Peter Billing	6	0	6	0	0	0	0	0
	DF	(England) ENG	Dean Glover	35	1	29	0	2	1	4	0
	DF	(England) ENG	Gareth Griffiths	25	1	20	0	2	1	3	0
	DF	(England) ENG	John Morris	0	0	0	0	0	0	0	0
	DF	(England) ENG	Bradley Sandeman	41	0	37	0	0	0	4	0
	DF	(England) ENG	Kevin Scott	17	1	17	1	0	0	0	0
	DF	(England) ENG	Dean Stokes	3	0	3	0	0	0	0	0
	DF	(England) ENG	Allen Tankard	45	1	39	1	2	0	4	0
	MF	(England) ENG	Ian Bogie	9	2	9	2	0	0	0	0
	MF	(England) ENG	Mark Burke	20	2	15	2	2	0	3	0
	MF	(England) ENG	Wayne Corden	1	0	1	0	0	0	0	0
	MF	(England) ENG	Steve Guppy	28	2	27	2	1	0	0	0
	MF	(Canada) CAN	Ollie Heald	0	0	0	0	0	0	0	0
	MF	(England) ENG	John Jeffers	11	1	10	1	1	0	0	0
	MF	(England) ENG	Kevin Kent	27	2	23	2	0	0	4	0
	MF	(Wales) WAL	Craig Lawton	1	0	1	0	0	0	0	0
	MF	(England) ENG	Andy Porter	50	3	44	3	2	0	4	0
	MF	(Netherlands) NED	Robin van der Laan	50	5	44	5	2	0	4	0
	MF	(England) ENG	Ray Walker	26	1	23	1	2	0	1	0
	MF	(England) ENG	Stewart Talbot	2	0	2	0	0	0	0	0
	FW	(England) ENG	Joe Allon	22	8	19	7	2	1	1	0
	FW	(England) ENG	John Burndred	1	0	1	0	0	0	0	0
	FW	(England) ENG	Martin Foyle	48	20	42	16	2	3	4	1
	FW	(Scotland) SCO	Lee Glover	34	7	28	4	2	0	4	3
	FW	(England) ENG	Tony Naylor	36	10	33	9	0	0	3	1
Players who featured but departed the club during the season:
	MF	(England) ENG	Tony Kelly	5	1	4	1	0	0	1	0

=== Top scorers ===
Place	Position	Nation	Name	First Division	FA Cup	League Cup	Total
1	FW	England	Martin Foyle	16	3	1	20
2	FW	England	Tony Naylor	9	0	1	10
3	FW	England	Joe Allon	7	1	0	8
4	FW	Scotland	Lee Glover	4	0	3	7
5	MF	Netherlands	Robin van der Laan	5	0	0	5
6	MF	England	Andy Porter	3	0	0	3
7	FW	England	Mark Burke	2	0	0	2
–	MF	England	Ian Bogie	2	0	0	2
–	MF	England	Kevin Kent	2	0	0	2
–	MF	England	Steve Guppy	2	0	0	2
11	MF	England	Tony Kelly	1	0	0	1
–	MF	England	John Jeffers	1	0	0	1
–	DF	England	Allen Tankard	1	0	0	1
–	MF	England	Ray Walker	1	0	0	1
–	DF	England	Kevin Scott	1	0	0	1
–	DF	England	Gareth Griffiths	0	1	0	1
–	DF	England	Dean Glover	0	1	0	1
–		–	Own goals	1	0	0	1
			TOTALS	58	6	5	69

== Transfers ==
=== Transfers in ===
Date from	Position	Nationality	Name	From	Fee	Ref.
May 1994	GK	NED	Arjan van Heusden	(Netherlands) VV Noordwijk	£4,500	
July 1994	MF	WAL	Craig Lawton	Manchester United	Free transfer	
18 July 1994	FW	ENG	Tony Naylor	Crewe Alexandra	£150,000	
August 1994	MF	ENG	Mark Burke	Wolverhampton Wanderers	Free transfer	
August 1994	MF	ENG	Stewart Talbot	Moor Green	Free transfer	
2 August 1994	FW	ENG	Lee Glover	Nottingham Forest	£200,000	
September 1994	MF	ENG	Tony Kelly	Bolton Wanderers	Free transfer	
25 November 1994	MF	ENG	Steve Guppy	Newcastle United	£225,000	
February 1995	MF	ENG	John Burndred	Knypersley Victoria	Free transfer	
23 March 1995	MF	ENG	Ian Bogie	Leyton Orient	£50,000	

=== Transfers out ===
Date from	Position	Nationality	Name	To	Fee	Ref.
1994	MF	ENG	Tony Kelly	Millwall	Free transfer	
November 1994	DF	ENG	Darren Hughes	Northampton Town	Quit	
May 1995	DF	ENG	Peter Billing	Hartlepool United	Free transfer	
May 1995	MF	ENG	John Burndred	Stafford Rangers	Free transfer	
May 1995	MF	CAN	Ollie Heald	Scarborough	Free transfer	
July 1995	FW	ENG	Joe Allon	Lincoln City	£42,500	
Summer 1995	MF	ENG	Mark Burke	(Netherlands) Fortuna Sittard	Free transfer	
Summer 1995	MF	NED	Robin van der Laan	Derby County	£475,000	

=== Loans in ===
Date from	Position	Nationality	Name	From	Date to	Ref.
13 January 1995	DF	ENG	Kevin Scott	Tottenham Hotspur	End of season	

=== Loans out ===
Date from	Position	Nationality	Name	To	Date to	Ref.
6 January 1995	MF	ENG	John Jeffers	Shrewsbury Town	January 1995	
