= Jan Jansson (footballer) =

Swedish footballer

Personal information
- Full name: Anders Jan Ove Jansson
- Date of birth: 26 January 1968 (age 58)
- Place of birth: Mörbylånga, Öland, Sweden
- Height: 5 ft 11 in (1.80 m)
- Position: Midfielder

Youth career
- Mörbylånga GoIF

Senior career*
Years	Team	Apps	(Gls)
1985–1987	Kalmar	34	(3)
1988–1992	Öster	127	(42)
1993–1997	Norrköping	82	(11)
1996–1997	→ Port Vale (loan)	11	(1)
1997–1999	Port Vale	40	(5)
1999–2001	Norrköping	15	(0)
Total		309	(62)

International career
1986	Sweden U19	2	(0)
1988–1990	Sweden U21	14	(3)
1991–1994	Sweden	7	(0)
- * Club domestic league appearances and goals

Anders Jan Ove Jansson (born 26 January 1968) is a Swedish former professional footballer who played as a midfielder. At the club level he represented Kalmar FF, Östers IF, IFK Norrköping, and Port Vale between 1985 and 2001. He won seven caps for the Sweden national team between 1991 and 1994 and was a squad member for his country at UEFA Euro 1992.

== Club career ==
=== Kalmar FF ===
Jansson began his senior career at Kalmar FF and played 11 games in the Allsvenskan in 1985, as the "Red brothers" finished second, just two points behind champions Malmö. He then featured 17 times in 1986, as the club slipped down the table and ended the season in the relegation zone. They suffered a second-successive relegation zone in 1987 and dropped out of Division 1 Södra, despite Jansson scoring three goals in 16 games.

=== Östers IF ===
Jansson moved back to the top flight with Öster and scored two goals in 20 league games in 1988 as the club was relegated to Division 1. New manager Hans Backe then led Östers to the Division 1 Södra title in 1989, with Jansson scoring 14 goals in 26 appearances. He then scored five goals in 22 games in 1990, as the team secured European football with a fourth-place finish. He then scored 13 goals in 31 appearances in 1991 and also scored a goal against Olympique Lyonnais in the UEFA Cup. He went on to score eight goals in 28 games in 1992, as Östers finished second in the league, seven points behind champions Norrköping.

=== IFK Norrköping ===
He moved on to league champions Norrköping and scored eight goals in 23 games as they finished second in the league in 1993, some five points behind champions Göteborg. He played 19 games without finding the net in 1994, as Norrköping finished in fourth place. He featured 25 times in 1995, as they had to beat GAIS over two legs after finishing in the relegation play-off zone. He scored one goal in six games in 1996, as Norrköping finished in eighth place.

==== Loan to Port Vale ====
He moved to England with First Division side Port Vale on a three-month loan in November 1996, during the Swedish winter break. He played 11 league games in the 1996–97 season and scored his first goal in the Football League at Vale Park on 19 January, in a 4–4 draw with Queens Park Rangers. Back with Norrköping, he scored two goals in nine games in the 1997 season.

=== Port Vale ===
Port Vale manager John Rudge signed him permanently during the summer of 1997 for a £200,000 fee. He scored five goals in 32 league and two League Cup appearances in the 1997–98 season, the last two of which helped to secure a 4–0 win over Huddersfield Town at the Alfred McAlpine Stadium on the final day of the season – the victory kept the "Valiants" out of the relegation zone. Jansson said that "That’s the first time in my career that I haven’t been able to sleep before a game. In Sweden, you play almost for fun, but here this is my work and it was important we stayed up." However, he featured just eight times in the 1998–99 season before being released by new manager Brian Horton in February.

=== Return to IFK Norrköping ===
Jansson returned to Sweden and his former club, Norrkoping, to make four appearances in 1999. He then played five games in 2000 and six games in 2001, before retiring from Nya Parken.

== International career ==
Jansson was a part of the Sweden U21 team that reached the semi-finals of the 1990 UEFA European Under-21 Championship. He won seven caps for the senior Sweden team between 1991 and 1994 and represented his country at UEFA Euro 1992 and the Joe Robbie Cup.

== Style of play ==
Jansson was a cultured midfielder and a dead ball specialist.

== Career statistics ==
=== Club ===
Appearances and goals by club, season and competition
Club	Season	League			FA Cup		Other		Total	
Club	Season	Division	Apps	Goals	Apps	Goals	Apps	Goals	Apps	Goals
Kalmar	1985	Allsvenskan	1	0						
Kalmar	1986	Allsvenskan	17	0						
Kalmar	1987	Swedish football Division 1	16	3						
Kalmar	Total		34	3						
Öster	1988	Allsvenskan	20	2						
Öster	1989	Swedish football Division 1	26	14						
Öster	1990	Allsvenskan	22	5						
Öster	1991	Allsvenskan	31	13						
Öster	1992	Allsvenskan	28	8						
Öster	Total		127	42						
Norrköping	1993	Allsvenskan	23	8						
Norrköping	1994	Allsvenskan	19	0						
Norrköping	1995	Allsvenskan	25	0						
Norrköping	1996	Allsvenskan	6	1						
Norrköping	1997	Allsvenskan	9	2						
Norrköping	Total		82	11						
Port Vale	1996–97	First Division	11	1	1	0	0	0	12	1
Port Vale	1997–98	First Division	33	5	0	0	2	0	35	5
Port Vale	1998–99	First Division	7	0	0	0	1	0	8	0
Port Vale	Total		51	6	1	0	3	0	55	6
Norrköping	1999	Allsvenskan	4	0						
Norrköping	2000	Allsvenskan	5	0						
Norrköping	2001	Allsvenskan	6	0						
Norrköping	Total		15	0						
Total			309	62	1	0	3	0	313	62

=== International ===
Appearances and goals by national team and year

National team	Year	Apps	Goals
Sweden	1991	1	0
Sweden	1992	4	0
Sweden	1993	1	0
Sweden	1994	1	0
Total		7	0

== Honours ==
Östers

- Swedish Football Division 1 Södra: 1989
