= Craig Lawton =

Welsh footballer

Personal information
- Full name: Craig Thomas Lawton
- Date of birth: 5 January 1972 (age 54)
- Place of birth: Mancot, Flintshire, Wales
- Height: 5 ft 7 in (1.70 m)
- Positions: Left midfielder; centre midfielder

Youth career
- ?–1990: Manchester United

Senior career*
Years	Team	Apps	(Gls)
1990–1994	Manchester United	0	(0)
1994–1996	Port Vale	3	(0)
1996–2002	Colwyn Bay	?	(?)
2002–2006	Connah's Quay Nomads	?	(?)
2006–20??	Bala Town	?	(?)

International career
	Wales U21	1	(?)
1992	Wales B	1	(0)
- * Club domestic league appearances and goals

Craig Thomas Lawton (born 5 January 1972) is a Welsh former footballer who played for Manchester United and Port Vale in the early 1990s, before playing football in the Welsh leagues for Colwyn Bay, Connah's Quay Nomads, and Bala Town.

== Club career ==
Born in Mancot, Flintshire, Lawton began his career at Alex Ferguson's Manchester United, signing his first professional contract at Old Trafford in July 1990. The closest Lawton got to making an appearance for the "Red Devils" came in a Premier League match against Queens Park Rangers in January 1993, when he was an unused substitute. He was given the number 22 jersey for the 1993–94 season but did not make a single appearance for United. Soon after, he suffered a broken leg, and was allowed to join Port Vale on a free transfer in July 1994.

He made his First Division debut as a substitute in a 3–2 defeat at Watford on New Year's Eve 1994, but broke a leg in a reserve team game in March 1995. His full debut came in a goalless draw with Genoa in an Anglo-Italian Cup game at Vale Park on 8 November 1995. Unable to gain a first-team place with the "Valiants" with only five appearances in 1994–95 and 1995–96, manager John Rudge gave him a free transfer to Colwyn Bay in May 1996. He played for Colwyn Bay for six years before moving to Connah's Quay Nomads, and then Bala Town four years later.

== International career ==
Lawton was capped for Wales at schoolboy, youth, under-21 and "B" internationals.

== Career statistics ==
Appearances and goals by club, season and competition
Club	Season	League			FA Cup		Other		Total	
Club	Season	Division	Apps	Goals	Apps	Goals	Apps	Goals	Apps	Goals
Port Vale	1994–95	First Division	1	0	0	0	0	0	1	0
Port Vale	1995–96	First Division	2	0	0	0	2	0	4	0
Port Vale	Total		3	0	0	0	2	0	5	0
