= Rogier Koordes =

Dutch footballer (born 1972)

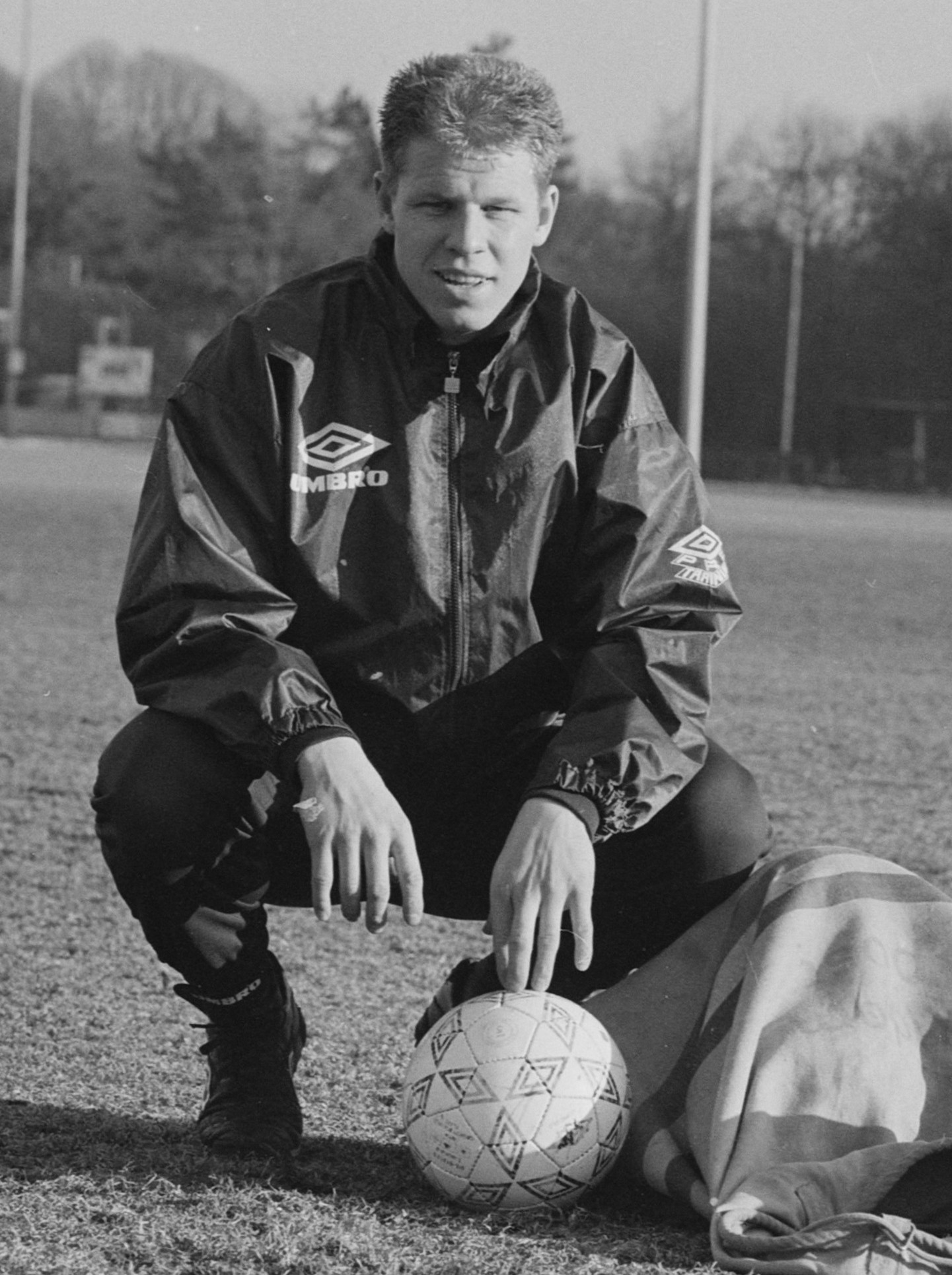
- Rogier Koordes in 1996

Personal information
- Full name: Rogier Koordes
- Date of birth: 13 June 1972 (age 54)
- Place of birth: Haarlem, Netherlands
- Height: 6 ft 1 in (1.85 m)
- Position: Midfielder

Senior career*
Years	Team	Apps	(Gls)
1994–1997	Telstar		
1997–1999	Port Vale	38	(0)
1999–2001	Oss		
2001–2003	Haarlem		
200?–2007	Ter Leede		
2007–2008	Rijnvogels		
- * Club domestic league appearances and goals

Rogier Koordes (born 13 June 1972) is a Dutch former footballer who played in England for Port Vale between February 1997 and February 1999. In between this spell he played in the Netherlands for Telstar, Oss, Haarlem, and Ter Leede.

== Career ==
Koordes began his career at Telstar, who finished the 1994–95 season in 11th place in the Eerste Divisie, and then ninth place in 1995–96 under Cor Pot's stewardship. Koordes left the TATA Steel Stadion when he was purchased by English First Division club Port Vale in February 1997 for a £75,000 fee. He played 13 league games in the remainder of the 1996–97 season, but featured just nine times in the 1997–98 campaign. He played 17 league and League Cup games in the 1998–99 campaign, but left Vale Park in February 1999 after manager John Rudge was sacked and replaced by Brian Horton. After leaving Burslem he returned to his native the Netherlands to play for Oss. TOP finished 16th in the Eerste Divisie in 1998–99, and then in last place in 1999–2000, before rising to tenth position in 2000–01. Koordes then switched to Heini Otto's HFC Haarlem, and helped the club to 12th and 14th-place finishes in 2001–02 and 2002–03. He then left Haarlem Stadion and ended up with Ter Leede. In January 2007, he joined Rijnvogels in the Eerste Klasse (Dutch 4th tier).

== Career statistics ==
Appearances and goals by club, season and competition
Club	Season	League			FA Cup		Other		Total	
Club	Season	Division	Apps	Goals	Apps	Goals	Apps	Goals	Apps	Goals
Port Vale	1996–97	First Division	13	0	0	0	0	0	13	0
Port Vale	1997–98	First Division	10	0	0	0	0	0	10	0
Port Vale	1998–99	First Division	15	0	0	0	1	0	16	0
Port Vale	Total		38	0	0	0	1	0	39	0
