= 2002–03 Rotherham United F.C. season =

Rotherham United
2002–03 season
- Football League First Division: 15th
- FA Cup: Third Round
- League Cup: Fourth Round
Home colours

The 2002–03 season saw Rotherham United compete in the Football League First Division where they finished in 15th position with 45 points.

== Final league table ==
Pos	Team	Pld	W	D	L	GF	GA	GD	Pts
13	Watford	46	17	9	20	54	70	−16	60
14	Crystal Palace	46	14	17	15	59	52	+7	59
15	Rotherham United	46	15	14	17	62	62	0	59
16	Burnley	46	15	10	21	65	89	−24	55
17	Walsall	46	15	9	22	57	69	−12	54

Updated to match(es) played on 11 May 2003. Source: Soccerway
Rules for classification: 1) points; 2) goal difference; 3) number of goals scored.

== Results ==
Rotherham United's score comes first

=== Legend ===
Win	Draw	Loss

=== Football League First Division ===
Match	Date	Opponent	Venue	Result	Attendance	Scorers
1	10 August 2002	Millwall	A	6–0	7,177	Byfield (4), McIntosh, Sedgwick
2	13 August 2002	Norwich City	H	1–1	7,867	Lee
3	17 August 2002	Preston North End	H	0–0	6,885	
4	24 August 2002	Sheffield Wednesday	A	2–1	22,873	Lee, Garner
5	26 August 2002	Derby County	H	2–1	8,408	Lee (2)
6	31 August 2002	Bradford City	A	2–4	12,385	Barker, Robins
7	7 September 2002	Reading	H	0–0	6,154	
8	14 September 2002	Sheffield United	A	0–1	19,948	
9	17 September 2002	Walsall	A	4–3	4,648	Byfield (2), Lee (2)
10	21 September 2002	Brighton & Hove Albion	H	1–0	6,696	Lee
11	28 September 2002	Nottingham Forest	A	2–3	25,089	Barker, Byfield
12	5 October 2002	Portsmouth	H	2–3	8,604	Byfield, Lee
13	12 October 2002	Gillingham	H	1–1	6,094	Ashby (o.g.)
14	19 October 2002	Grimsby Town	A	0–0	6,418	
15	26 October 2002	Stoke City	H	4–0	7,078	Barker (2), Swailes, Lee
16	29 October 2002	Wimbledon	A	1–2	849	Lee
17	2 November 2002	Coventry City	A	1–2	13,179	Daws
18	9 November 2002	Watford	H	2–1	6,790	Barker, McIntosh
19	16 November 2002	Burnley	H	0–0	7,575	
20	23 November 2002	Leicester City	A	1–2	31,714	McIntosh
21	30 November 2002	Wolverhampton Wanderers	H	0–0	6,736	
22	7 December 2002	Ipswich Town	A	2–1	22,770	Barker, Talbot
23	14 December 2002	Burnley	A	6–2	14,121	Byfield (2), Lee (2), Mullin (2)
24	22 December 2002	Crystal Palace	H	1–3	6,829	Byfield
25	22 December 2002	Preston North End	A	2–0	15,452	Barker, Robins
26	28 December 2002	Millwall	H	1–3	6,448	Hurst
27	1 January 2003	Sheffield Wednesday	H	0–2	11,480	
28	11 January 2003	Norwich City	A	1–1	19,452	Garner
29	18 January 2003	Bradford City	H	3–2	6,939	Garner, McIntosh, Byfield
30	1 February 2003	Derby County	A	0–3	26,275	
31	8 February 2003	Watford	A	2–1	15,025	McIntosh, Swailes
32	15 February 2003	Coventry City	H	1–0	6,524	Byfield
33	22 February 2003	Reading	A	0–3	14,816	
34	28 February 2003	Sheffield United	H	1–2	10,797	Lee
35	4 March 2003	Walsall	H	0–0	5,792	
36	8 March 2003	Brighton & Hove Albion	A	0–2	6,468	
37	15 March 2003	Gillingham	A	1–1	7,284	Warne
38	18 March 2003	Grimsby Town	H	0–1	6,239	
39	22 March 2003	Wimbledon	H	2–1	5,896	Robins, Branston
40	5 April 2003	Wolverhampton Wanderers	A	0–0	25,944	
41	9 April 2003	Stoke City	A	0–2	19,553	
42	12 April 2003	Leicester City	H	1–1	9,888	Lee
43	19 April 2003	Crystal Palace	A	0–0	15,508	
44	21 April 2003	Ipswich Town	H	2–1	7,519	Robins, Mullin
45	27 April 2003	Portsmouth	A	2–3	19,420	Branston, Swailes
46	4 May 2003	Nottingham Forest	H	2–2	9,942	Lee, Robins

=== FA Cup ===
Round	Date	Opponent	Venue	Result	Attendance	Scorers
Third round	4 January 2003	Wimbledon	H	0–3	4,527	

=== Football League Cup ===
Round	Date	Opponent	Venue	Result	Attendance	Scorers
First round	10 September 2002	Carlisle United	H	3–1	2,905	Monkhouse, Robins, Warne
Second round	1 October 2002	Wolverhampton Wanderers	H	4–4 (4–2 pens)	5,064	Monkhouse, Robins, Barker, Swailes
Third round	5 November 2002	Wimbledon	A	3–1	664	Monkhouse, Barker, Lee
Fourth round	30 November 2002	Blackburn Rovers	A	0–4	11,220	

== Squad statistics ==
No.	Pos.	Name	League		FA Cup		League Cup		Total	
No.	Pos.	Name	Apps	Goals	Apps	Goals	Apps	Goals	Apps	Goals
1	GK	(England) Mike Pollitt	41	0	1	0	4	0	46	0
2	DF	(England) Chris Beech	1(1)	0	0	0	1	0	2(1)	0
4	DF	(England) Rob Scott	23	0	0	0	4	0	27	0
5	MF	(England) Darren Garner	20(6)	3	0(1)	0	3	0	23(7)	3
6	DF	(England) Marvin Bryan	12(4)	0	1	0	0(3)	0	13(7)	0
7	FW	(England) Mark Robins	6(9)	5	0(1)	0	2(1)	2	8(11)	7
8	DF	(England) Chris Swailes	43	3	1	0	4	1	48	4
9	FW	(Republic of Ireland) Alan Lee	38(3)	15	1	0	2	1	41(3)	16
10	MF	(England) Paul Warne	21(19)	1	1	0	1(3)	1	23(22)	2
11	MF	(England) Nick Daws	30(3)	1	1	0	3(1)	0	34(4)	1
12	MF	(England) Stewart Talbot	8(7)	1	0	0	0	0	8(7)	1
14	FW	(England) Will Hoskins	0	0	0	0	0	0	0	0
15	DF	(Scotland) Martin McIntosh	42	5	1	0	2	0	45	5
16	DF	(England) Paul Hurst	44	1	1	0	3	0	48	1
17	MF	(England) John Mullin	31(3)	3	1	0	2	0	34(3)	3
19	MF	(England) Gareth Farrelly	6	0	0	0	0	0	6	0
20	FW	(England) Andy Monkhouse	11(9)	0	0	0	4	3	15(9)	3
22	DF	(England) Shaun Barker	11	0	0	0	0	0	11	0
23	FW	(Jamaica) Darren Byfield	24(13)	13	0	0	0(1)	0	24(14)	13
24	FW	(England) Chris Sedgwick	42(1)	1	1	0	3	0	46(1)	1
25	DF	(England) Curtis Woodhouse	11	0	0	0	0	0	11	0
28	DF	(England) Guy Branston	13(2)	2	0	0	2	0	15(2)	2
29	FW	(England) Richie Barker	23(14)	7	1	0	4	2	28(14)	9
30	GK	(England) Ian Gray	5(1)	0	0	0	0	0	5(1)	0
