= John Burndred =

English footballer

Personal information
- Full name: John Nigel Burndred
- Date of birth: 23 March 1968 (age 58)
- Place of birth: Stoke-on-Trent, England
- Height: 5 ft 7 in (1.70 m)
- Position: Forward

Youth career
- Knypersley Victoria

Senior career*
Years	Team	Apps	(Gls)
1995	Port Vale	1	(0)
- Stafford Rangers
- Newcastle Town
- * Club domestic league appearances and goals

John Nigel Burndred (born 23 March 1968) is an English former footballer who played for Knypersley Victoria, Port Vale, Stafford Rangers, and Newcastle Town.

== Career ==
Burndred played for Knypersley Victoria, where he won the Midland Football Alliance golden boot with 31 goals in the 1994–95 season, before joining his favourite club Port Vale in February 1995, initially on trial. He made his First Division debut at Vale Park in a 1–1 draw with Notts County on 7 May 1995, the last day of the 1994–95 season, but "Valiants" manager John Rudge allowed him to leave on a free transfer later that month. After a trial with Walsall he moved back into non-League football with Stafford Rangers (Southern League) and Newcastle Town.

During his long periods of non-League football, he worked as a manager at a Burslem pottery firm.

== Career statistics ==
Appearances and goals by club, season and competition
Club	Season	League			FA Cup		Other		Total	
Club	Season	Division	Apps	Goals	Apps	Goals	Apps	Goals	Apps	Goals
Port Vale	1994–95	First Division	1	0	0	0	0	0	1	0
