= 1998–99 Port Vale F.C. season =

British football season

Port Vale F.C.
1998–99 season
- Chairman: Bill Bell
- Manager: John Rudge (until 18 January); Brian Horton (from 22 January)
- Stadium: Vale Park
- Football League First Division: 21st (47 points)
- FA Cup: Third Round (eliminated by Liverpool)
- League Cup: First Round (eliminated by Chester City)
- Player of the Year: Martin Foyle
- Top goalscorer: League: Martin Foyle (9); All: Martin Foyle (9)
- Highest home attendance: 16,557 vs. Liverpool, 3 January 1999
- Lowest home attendance: 3,478 vs. Chester City, 11 August 1998
- Average home league attendance: 6,991
- Biggest win: 2–0 (three games)
- Biggest defeat: 0–4 (twice)
Home colours	Away colours

The 1998–99 season was Port Vale's 87th season of football in the English Football League, and fifth successive season in the First Division. After 16 years at the helm, manager John Rudge was relieved of his duties in January and replaced by Brian Horton, ushering in a period of upheaval that saw a club-record 43 players make league appearances throughout the campaign. Battling to maintain their league status, Vale ultimately narrowly avoided relegation on goals scored, despite a final-day defeat to Bury — who went down having scored ten fewer goals.

Vale's cup runs were brief: they were eliminated from the FA Cup in the Third Round by Liverpool, and suffered a shock exit in the First Round of the League Cup, falling to Fourth Division Chester City. Up front, Martin Foyle led the line, finishing as both league and season top scorer with nine goals, while Gareth Ainsworth chipped in with six across all competitions. Support from the terraces reflected the club's struggles; the highest attendance at Vale Park was 16,557 for the Liverpool FA Cup tie, while the lowest was 3,478 in the League Cup defeat to Chester; the average attendance stood at 6,991. Vale's biggest wins were modest — three 2–0 victories — while their heaviest defeats were two 4–0 losses.

Vale's season was a rollercoaster of managerial change, record squad turnover, and a dramatic escape from relegation — anchored by Foyle's goals and a last-gasp survival that succeeded on goals scored.

== Overview ==
=== First Division ===
The pre-season saw John Rudge splash out £300,000 on Bristol Rovers forward Peter Beadle and £100,000 on Scunthorpe United defender Michael Walsh. He also signed Dave Barnett (Dunfermline Athletic); Brian McGlinchey and Paul Beesley (Manchester City); and John McQuade (Hamilton Academical) on free transfers. Stéphane Pounewatchy also became the first French player to play for the club when he was signed on a monthly contract from Dundee. Scott Mean was loaned to the club by West Ham United, though he went on to sustain a knee injury during his spell that would damage his career. Also, Andy Clarke was signed on loan from Wimbledon.

The season started poorly with three defeats, Lee Hughes scoring a hat-trick for West Bromwich Albion to finish this run-off. Two wins opened the month of September, including a 2–1 home victory over Wolverhampton Wanderers to which match reporter Martin Spinks said: "a result like this requires a wooden mallet to the forehead such was its unlikelihood". The month ended with former Valiant Lee Mills scoring a brace for Bradford City in a 4–0 win over Vale at Valley Parade. In October, Derek McGill signed from Queens Park Rangers, though he would move on to Hamilton Academical later in the year. On 29 October, Gareth Ainsworth became Vale's biggest ever transfer as he was sold to Wimbledon for £2 million. In November, Robin Berntsen became the first Norwegian to play for the Vale when he arrived on loan from Tromsø IL. In addition to this, French forward Christophe Horlaville joined on loan from Le Havre, and Des Lyttle also arrived on loan from Nottingham Forest. After winning the first four games in October, Vale then went on a streak of twelve defeats in 15 games, though the sole victory of this run, a 1–0 win over Bury on 19 December, would prove to be crucial at the end of the season. The win was not enough for Rudge, who would get the sack in January after he made his final two signings: Trinidadian midfielder Tony Rougier from Hibernian for £175,000, and young striker Marcus Bent from Crystal Palace for a £375,000 fee. After Rudge was sacked by Chairman Bill Bell, highly distressed fans formed a "flat cap protest" (Rudge's headwear of choice) against the decision. Offered the role of Director of Football at the club, he instead took up the same position at rivals Stoke City. To replace him, Bell appointed experienced manager and former Vale player Brian Horton, paying Brighton & Hove Albion £80,000 in compensation.

In February, Peter Beadle was sold to Notts County for £250,000, representing a £50,000 loss. On 6 February, Vale recorded a 2–0 home win over Huddersfield Town as Foyle claimed a brace. On 9 March, Vale won 4–3 at Norwich City to end a run of ten consecutive away defeats with what was voted as the performance of the week by the League Managers Association. The month of March saw Horton make his first signings as manager, bringing in five new faces: Dave Brammer (£300,000 from Wrexham); Tony Butler (£115,000 from Blackpool); Carl Griffiths (£100,000 from Leyton Orient); Alex Smith (£75,000 from Chester City); and Chris Allen (free from Nottingham Forest). This cost the club a total of £590,000. He also took in striker Alan Lee on loan from Aston Villa, and Craig Russell on loan from Manchester City. His changes finally paid off in April, as Vale went on a five-game unbeaten run. Their penultimate game was a 2–0 victory over QPR, which included a first career goal for 18-year old defender Anthony Gardner. A final day 1–0 defeat at fellow relegation candidates Bury was inconsequential.

They finished in 21st position with 47 points, ahead of Bury on goals scored, but behind both Portsmouth and Queens Park Rangers on goals scored. Had the goals difference rule been in effect, Vale would have been relegated instead of Bury. Crewe Alexandra finished three places and one position higher than the Vale. Vale suffered 25 defeats, more than any other club in the league, and only Grimsby and Bury had scored fewer goals. Player of the Year Martin Foyle was the club's top-scorer with nine goals, representing the lowest total tally for the club's top-scorer since 1964–65. Only Paul Musselwhite and Allen Tankard managed to hit forty appearances, as a club record 43 players managed to turn out for the club throughout the season.

At the end of the season, there was a complete clear-out, with ten players leaving: ten-year club veteran Neil Aspin (Darlington); Dave Barnett (Lincoln City); Brian McGlinchey (Gillingham); John McQuade (Raith Rovers); Chris Allen (Stockport County); Rogier Koordes (TOP Oss); Jan Jansson (IFK Norrköping); Paul Mahorn (Stevenage Borough); Stéphane Pounewatchy (Colchester United); and Paul Beesley (Blackpool).

=== Finances ===
The club's shirt sponsors were Tunstall Assurance. Season ticket prices ranged between £228 and £257 fr adults, and matchday tickets were £12 and £13.50.

=== Cup competitions ===
In the FA Cup, Vale hosted Premier League side Liverpool. The "Reds" left Burslem with a 3–0 victory, the goals scored by Michael Owen, Paul Ince, and Robbie Fowler.

In the League Cup, Third Division Chester City dispatched the Vale 2–1 at Vale Park, and held on to a 2–2 draw at the Deva Stadium to embarrass Vale fans with a minor giant-killing act.

== Results ==
=== Football League First Division ===
==== League table ====
Pos	Team	Pld	W	D	L	GF	GA	GD	Pts	Qualification or relegation
19	Portsmouth	46	11	14	21	57	73	−16	47	
20	Queens Park Rangers	46	12	11	23	52	61	−9	47	
21	Port Vale	46	13	8	25	45	75	−30	47	
22	Bury (R)	46	10	17	19	35	60	−25	47	Relegation to the Second Division
23	Oxford United (R)	46	10	14	22	48	71	−23	44	Relegation to the Second Division

Rules for classification: 1) Points; 2) Goals scored; 3) Goal difference
(R) Relegated

==== Results by matchday ====
Round	1	2	3	4	5	6	7	8	9	10	11	12	13	14	15	16	17	18	19	20	21	22	23	24	25	26	27	28	29	30	31	32	33	34	35	36	37	38	39	40	41	42	43	44	45	46
Ground	H	A	H	A	H	H	A	H	A	A	H	A	H	H	A	H	A	A	H	A	H	A	A	H	A	H	A	H	A	H	A	H	A	A	H	A	H	A	H	A	H	H	A	H	H	A
Result	L	L	L	D	L	W	W	L	D	L	W	W	W	W	D	L	L	L	L	L	D	L	L	W	L	L	L	L	L	W	L	W	L	W	D	L	L	L	W	D	D	W	D	L	W	L
Position	23	24	24	24	24	22	19	19	21	23	20	18	15	12	13	13	13	15	16	20	19	22	22	20	20	21	22	23	23	22	22	21	21	20	20	21	21	22	21	22	21	20	20	21	20	21
Points	0	0	0	1	1	4	7	7	8	8	11	14	17	20	21	21	21	21	21	21	22	22	22	25	25	25	25	25	25	28	28	31	31	34	35	35	35	35	38	39	40	43	44	44	47	47

Source: Statto
A = Away; H = Home; W = Win; D = Draw; L = Loss

==== Matches ====
8 August 1998 1	Port Vale	0–2	Birmingham City	Burslem
		Report	Furlong 21'; Adebola 68'	Stadium: Vale Park; Attendance: 10,465; Referee: Scott Mathieson

15 August 1998 2	Huddersfield Town	2–1	Port Vale	Huddersfield
	Dalton 40'; Stewart 60'	Report	Ainsworth 71'	Stadium: Kirklees Stadium; Attendance: 10,030; Referee: Roy Pearson

22 August 1998 3	Port Vale	0–3	West Bromwich Albion	Burslem
		Report	Hughes 58', 77', 80'	Stadium: Vale Park; Attendance: 8,146; Referee: Eddie Lomas

29 August 1998 4	Swindon Town	1–1	Port Vale	Swindon
	Barnett 56' (og.)	Report	Ainsworth 22'	Stadium: County Ground; Attendance: 7,800; Referee: Barry Knight

31 August 1998 5	Port Vale	0–3	Ipswich Town	Burslem
		Report	Scowcroft 22'; Johnson 57'; Holland 90'	Stadium: Vale Park; Attendance: 5,485; Referee: Mike Jones

8 September 1998 6	Port Vale	2–1	Wolverhampton Wanderers	Burslem
	Beadle 14'; Naylor 58'	Report	Keane 67'	Stadium: Vale Park; Attendance: 8,087; Referee: John Kirkby

12 September 1998 7	Crystal Palace	0–1	Port Vale	Selhurst, Croydon
		Report	Beadle 83'	Stadium: Selhurst Park; Attendance: 15,983; Referee: Paul Danson

19 September 1998 8	Port Vale	0–2	Portsmouth	Burslem
		Report	Aloisi 52'; Durnin 89'	Stadium: Vale Park; Attendance: 5,992; Referee: Matt Messias

26 September 1998 9	Grimsby Town	2–2	Port Vale	Cleethorpes
	Clare 65', 90'	Report	Naylor 2'; Beesley 45'	Stadium: Blundell Park; Attendance: 5,747; Referee: Terry Heilbron

29 September 1998 10	Bradford City	4–0	Port Vale	Bradford
	Blake 31'; Moore 57'; Mills 60', 89'	Report		Stadium: Valley Parade; Attendance: 13,245; Referee: George Cain

3 October 1998 11	Port Vale	1–0	Norwich City	Burslem
	Ainsworth 61'	Report		Stadium: Vale Park; Attendance: 5,580; Referee: Paul Robinson

11 October 1998 12	Barnsley	0–2	Port Vale	Barnsley
		Report	Foyle 47'; Beadle 56'	Stadium: Oakwell; Attendance: 16,195; Referee: Paul Taylor

17 October 1998 13	Port Vale	3–2	Bristol City	Burslem
	Beesley 1'; Ainsworth 47', 86'	Report	Murray 55'; Akinbiyi 59'	Stadium: Vale Park; Attendance: 6,691; Referee: Ken Leach

20 October 1998 14	Port Vale	1–0	Crewe Alexandra	Burslem
	Beesley 68'	Report		Stadium: Vale Park; Attendance: 8,205; Referee: Roger Furnandiz

24 October 1998 15	Watford	2–2	Port Vale	Watford
	Gudmundsson 27', 53'	Report	Foyle 12'; Tankard 82'	Stadium: Vicarage Road; Attendance: 8,750; Referee: Brian Coddington

31 October 1998 16	Port Vale	2–3	Sheffield United	Burslem
	Foyle 56'; Beadle 71'	Report	Stuart 24'; Kachuro 51'; Saunders 87'	Stadium: Vale Park; Attendance: 6,737; Referee: William Burns

4 November 1998 17	Bolton Wanderers	3–1	Port Vale	Bolton
	Taylor 5'; Frandsen 20'; Gunnlaugsson 69'	Report	Beadle 79'	Stadium: Reebok Stadium; Attendance: 13,324; Referee: Graham Frankland

8 November 1998 18	Stockport County	4–2	Port Vale	Stockport
	Angell 20', 41', 87'; Grant 90'	Report	Beadle 43'; Flynn 56' (og.)	Stadium: Edgeley Park; Attendance: 7,612; Referee: Chris Foy

14 November 1998 19	Port Vale	0–2	Sunderland	Burslem
		Report	Aspin 28' (og.); Quinn 65'	Stadium: Vale Park; Attendance: 8,839; Referee: Guy Stretton

21 November 1998 20	Oxford United	2–1	Port Vale	Oxford
	Windass 6' (pen.); Powell 13'	Report	McGlinchey 29'	Stadium: Manor Ground; Attendance: 5,964; Referee: Rob Styles

28 November 1998 21	Port Vale	2–2	Tranmere Rovers	Burslem
	Foyle 30', 63'	Report	Allen 57'; Irons 79'	Stadium: Vale Park; Attendance: 5,216; Referee: Clive Wilkes

5 December 1998 22	Queens Park Rangers	3–2	Port Vale	Shepherd's Bush, West London
	Maddix 47'; Talbot 57' (og.); Sheron 88'	Report	Foyle 31'; Barker 78'	Stadium: Loftus Road; Attendance: 10,498; Referee: Mick Fletcher

12 December 1998 23	Sunderland	2–0	Port Vale	Sunderland
	Smith 24'; Butler 44'	Report		Stadium: Stadium of Light; Attendance: 37,583; Referee: Scott Mathieson

19 December 1998 24	Port Vale	1–0	Bury	Burslem
	Barker 72' (pen.)	Report		Stadium: Vale Park; Attendance: 6,425; Referee: Trevor Jones

26 December 1998 25	West Bromwich Albion	3–2	Port Vale	West Bromwich
	Murphy 5'; Bortolazzi 54'; Hughes 75' (pen.)	Report	Naylor 50', 56'	Stadium: The Hawthorns; Attendance: 14,929; Referee: Kevin Lynch

28 December 1998 26	Port Vale	0–2	Bolton Wanderers	Burslem
		Report	Sellars 48'; Holdsworth 75' (pen.)	Stadium: Vale Park; Attendance: 8,201; Referee: Paul Robinson

9 January 1999 27	Birmingham City	1–0	Port Vale	Birmingham
	Furlong 9'	Report		Stadium: St Andrew's; Attendance: 18,632; Referee: Paul Taylor

16 January 1999 28	Port Vale	0–1	Swindon Town	Burslem
		Report	Ndah 9'	Stadium: Vale Park; Attendance: 5,405; Referee: Graham Laws

30 January 1999 29	Ipswich Town	1–0	Port Vale	Ipswich
	Clapham 40'	Report		Stadium: Portman Road; Attendance: 16,328; Referee: Mick Pierce

6 February 1999 30	Port Vale	2–0	Huddersfield Town	Burslem
	Foyle 22', 33'	Report		Stadium: Vale Park; Attendance: 6,499; Referee: Mike Dean

13 February 1999 31	Wolverhampton Wanderers	3–1	Port Vale	Wolverhampton
	Simpson 2'; Keane 32'; Curle 89' (pen.)	Report	Bogie 4'	Stadium: Molineux Stadium; Attendance: 20,952; Referee: Matt Messias

20 February 1999 32	Port Vale	1–0	Crystal Palace	Burslem
	Tankard 40'	Report		Stadium: Vale Park; Attendance: 6,051; Referee: Roy Pearson

27 February 1999 33	Portsmouth	4–0	Port Vale	Portsmouth
	McLoughlin 29' (pen.); Whittingham 36', 39', 89'	Report		Stadium: Fratton Park; Attendance: 12,838; Referee: Andy Hall

9 March 1999 34	Norwich City	3–4	Port Vale	Norwich
	Fleming 30'; Roberts 68'; Bellamy 83'	Report	Tankard 14'; Russell 35'; Walsh 50'; Bogie 87'	Stadium: Carrow Road; Attendance: 12,960; Referee: Barry Knight

13 March 1999 35	Port Vale	1–1	Stockport County	Burslem
	Allen 65'	Report	Smith 21'	Stadium: Vale Park; Attendance: 6,456; Referee: Paul Danson

20 March 1999 36	Sheffield United	3–0	Port Vale	Sheffield
	Devlin 72'; Marcelo 78'; Hunt 90'	Report		Stadium: Bramall Lane; Attendance: 15,515; Referee: Ray Olivier

23 March 1999 37	Port Vale	0–1	Grimsby Town	Burslem
		Report	Groves 71'	Stadium: Vale Park; Attendance: 4,980; Referee: Roger Furnandiz

3 April 1999 38	Bristol City	2–0	Port Vale	Ashton Gate, Bristol
	Akinbiyi 31'; Howells 36'	Report		Stadium: Ashton Gate; Attendance: 11,039; Referee: Steve Bennett

5 April 1999 39	Port Vale	1–0	Barnsley	Burslem
	Foyle 8'	Report		Stadium: Vale Park; Attendance: 5,968; Referee: David Laws

10 April 1999 40	Crewe Alexandra	0–0	Port Vale	Crewe
		Report		Stadium: Gresty Road; Attendance: 5,606; Referee: David Crick

13 April 1999 41	Port Vale	1–1	Bradford City	Burslem
	Lee 20'	Report	Mills 33'	Stadium: Vale Park; Attendance: 6,998; Referee: Paul Rejer

17 April 1999 42	Port Vale	1–0	Oxford United	Burslem
	Tankard 55'	Report		Stadium: Vale Park; Attendance: 7,393; Referee: Mick Fletcher

24 April 1999 43	Tranmere Rovers	1–1	Port Vale	Prenton
	Mahon 45' (pen.)	Report	Lee 61'	Stadium: Prenton Park; Attendance: 7,770; Referee: Eddie Wolstenholme

27 April 1999 44	Port Vale	1–2	Watford	Burslem
	Widdrington 28' (pen.)	Report	Mooney 24', 60'	Stadium: Vale Park; Attendance: 7,126; Referee: George Cain

1 May 1999 45	Port Vale	2–0	Queens Park Rangers	Burslem
	Gardner 22'; Griffiths 66'	Report		Stadium: Vale Park; Attendance: 9,851; Referee: Guy Stretton

9 May 1999 46	Bury	1–0	Port Vale	Bury, Greater Manchester
	West 67'	Report		Stadium: Gigg Lane; Attendance: 7,567; Referee: John Kirkby

=== FA Cup ===
3 January 1999 R3	Port Vale	0–3	Liverpool	Burslem
		Report	Owen 34' (pen.); Ince 38'; Fowler 90'	Stadium: Vale Park; Attendance: 16,557; Referee: Rob Harris

=== League Cup ===
11 August 1998 R1 1st Leg	Port Vale	1–2	Chester City	Burslem
	Ainsworth 48'	Report	Beckett 24', 28'	Stadium: Vale Park; Attendance: 3,478; Referee: Eddie Wolstenholme

18 August 1998 R1 2nd Leg	Chester City	2–2 (4–3 agg.)	Port Vale	Chester
	Smith 52'; Snijders 82' (og.)	Report	Naylor 21', 67'	Stadium: Deva Stadium; Attendance: 2,461; Referee: William Burns

== Squad statistics ==
=== Appearances and goals ===
Key to positions: GK – Goalkeeper; DF – Defender; MF – Midfielder; FW – Forward

No.	Pos	Nat	Player	Total		First Division		FA Cup		League Cup	
No.	Pos	Nat	Player	Apps	Goals	Apps	Goals	Apps	Goals	Apps	Goals
	GK	(England) ENG	Matthew Boswell	0	0	0	0	0	0	0	0
	GK	(England) ENG	Paul Musselwhite	40	0	38	0	0	0	2	0
	GK	(England) ENG	Kevin Pilkington	9	0	8	0	1	0	0	0
	DF	(England) ENG	Neil Aspin	32	0	30	0	1	0	1	0
	DF	(England) ENG	Dave Barnett	28	0	27	0	1	0	0	0
	DF	(England) ENG	Paul Beesley	36	3	35	3	1	0	0	0
	DF	(England) ENG	Tony Butler	4	0	4	0	0	0	0	0
	DF	(Northern Ireland) NIR	Liam Burns	4	0	4	0	0	0	0	0
	DF	(England) ENG	Matt Carragher	12	0	10	0	0	0	2	0
	DF	(England) ENG	Anthony Gardner	15	1	15	1	0	0	0	0
	DF	(Northern Ireland) NIR	Brian McGlinchey	17	1	15	1	1	0	1	0
	DF	(England) ENG	Alex Smith	8	0	8	0	0	0	0	0
	DF	(Netherlands) NED	Mark Snijders	12	0	10	0	0	0	2	0
	DF	(England) ENG	Allen Tankard	40	4	37	4	1	0	2	0
	DF	(England) ENG	Michael Walsh	22	1	19	1	1	0	2	0
	MF	(England) ENG	Chris Allen	5	1	5	1	0	0	0	0
	MF	(England) ENG	Simon Armstrong	0	0	0	0	0	0	0	0
	MF	(England) ENG	Simon Barker	27	2	27	2	0	0	0	0
	MF	(England) ENG	Ian Bogie	38	2	35	2	1	0	2	0
	MF	(England) ENG	Dave Brammer	9	0	9	0	0	0	0	0
	MF	(England) ENG	Neil Brisco	2	0	1	0	1	0	0	0
	MF	(England) ENG	Wayne Corden	18	0	16	0	1	0	1	0
	MF	(England) ENG	Richard Eyre	11	0	11	0	0	0	0	0
	MF	(Scotland) SCO	John McQuade	4	0	3	0	0	0	1	0
	MF	(Northern Ireland) NIR	Tony McShane	0	0	0	0	0	0	0	0
	MF	(Republic of Ireland) IRL	George O'Callaghan	5	0	4	0	1	0	0	0
	MF	(Trinidad and Tobago) TTO	Tony Rougier	13	0	13	0	0	0	0	0
	MF	(England) ENG	Stewart Talbot	35	0	33	0	0	0	2	0
	MF	(England) ENG	Tommy Widdrington	9	1	9	1	0	0	0	0
	FW	(England) ENG	Marcus Bent	15	0	15	0	0	0	0	0
	FW	(England) ENG	Martin Foyle	37	9	35	9	0	0	2	0
	FW	(England) ENG	Carl Griffiths	3	1	3	1	0	0	0	0
	FW	(Republic of Ireland) IRL	Alan Lee	11	2	11	2	0	0	0	0
	FW	(England) ENG	Tony Naylor	25	6	22	4	1	0	2	2
	FW	(England) ENG	Justin O'Reilly	0	0	0	0	0	0	0	0
	FW	(England) ENG	Craig Russell	8	1	8	1	0	0	0	0
	FW	(England) ENG	Steve Williams	0	0	0	0	0	0	0	0
Players who featured but departed the club during the season:
	DF	(England) ENG	Des Lyttle	7	0	7	0	0	0	0	0
	DF	(France) FRA	Stéphane Pounewatchy	2	0	2	0	0	0	0	0
	MF	(England) ENG	Gareth Ainsworth	17	6	15	5	0	0	2	1
	MF	(Norway) NOR	Robin Berntsen	1	0	1	0	0	0	0	0
	MF	(Sweden) SWE	Jan Jansson	8	0	7	0	0	0	1	0
	MF	(Netherlands) NED	Rogier Koordes	16	0	15	0	0	0	1	0
	MF	(England) ENG	Scott Mean	1	0	1	0	0	0	0	0
	FW	(England) ENG	Peter Beadle	26	6	23	6	1	0	2	0
	FW	(England) ENG	Andy Clarke	6	0	6	0	0	0	0	0
	FW	(France) FRA	Christophe Horlaville	3	0	2	0	1	0	0	0
	FW	(Scotland) SCO	Derek McGill	3	0	3	0	0	0	0	0

=== Top scorers ===
Place	Position	Nation	Name	First Division	FA Cup	League Cup	Total
1	FW	England	Martin Foyle	9	0	0	9
2	MF	England	Gareth Ainsworth	5	0	1	6
–	FW	England	Peter Beadle	6	0	0	6
–	FW	England	Tony Naylor	4	0	2	6
5	DF	England	Allen Tankard	4	0	0	4
6	DF	England	Paul Beesley	3	0	0	3
7	FW	Ireland	Alan Lee	2	0	0	2
–	MF	England	Simon Barker	2	0	0	2
–	MF	England	Ian Bogie	2	0	0	2
10	FW	England	Craig Russell	1	0	0	1
–	FW	England	Michael Walsh	1	0	0	1
–	FW	England	Anthony Gardner	1	0	0	1
–	FW	Northern Ireland	Brian McGlinchey	1	0	0	1
–	MF	England	Tommy Widdrington	1	0	0	1
–	MF	England	Chris Allen	1	0	0	1
–	FW	England	Carl Griffiths	1	0	0	1
–		–	Own goals	1	0	0	1
			TOTALS	45	0	3	48

== Transfers ==
=== Transfers in ===
Date from	Position	Nationality	Name	From	Fee	Ref.
June 1998	DF	NIR	Brian McGlinchey	Manchester City	Free transfer	
June 1998	MF	SCO	John McQuade	(Scotland) Hamilton Academical	Free transfer	
June 1998	GK	ENG	Kevin Pilkington	Manchester United	Free transfer	
30 July 1998	DF	ENG	Michael Walsh	Scunthorpe United	£100,000	
July 1998	DF	ENG	Dave Barnett	(Scotland) Dunfermline Athletic	Free transfer	
6 August 1998	FW	ENG	Peter Beadle	Bristol Rovers	£300,000	
28 August 1998	DF	ENG	Paul Beesley	Manchester City	Free transfer	
August 1998	MF	ENG	Neil Brisco	Manchester City	Free transfer	
September 1998	MF	ENG	Simon Barker	Queens Park Rangers	Free transfer	
September 1998	DF	FRA	Stéphane Pounewatchy	(Scotland) Dundee	Free transfer	
October 1998	FW	SCO	Derek McGill	(Scotland) Queen's Park	Free transfer	
4 January 1999	MF	TRI	Tony Rougier	(Scotland) Hibernian	£175,000	
15 January 1999	FW	ENG	Marcus Bent	Crystal Palace	£300,000	
March 1999	MF	ENG	Chris Allen	Nottingham Forest	Free transfer	
24 March 1999	MF	ENG	Dave Brammer	Wrexham	£350,000	
25 March 1999	DF	ENG	Tony Butler	Blackpool	£115,000	
25 March 1999	FW	WAL	Carl Griffiths	Leyton Orient	£100,000	
25 March 1999	MF	ENG	Alex Smith	Chester City	£75,000	

=== Transfers out ===
Date from	Position	Nationality	Name	To	Fee	Ref.
September 1998	DF	FRA	Stéphane Pounewatchy	Colchester United	Free transfer	
3 November 1998	MF	ENG	Gareth Ainsworth	Wimbledon	£2 million	
December 1998	FW	SCO	Derek McGill	(Scotland) Hamilton Academical	Free transfer	
18 February 1999	FW	ENG	Peter Beadle	Notts County	£250,000	
February 1999	MF	SWE	Jan Jansson	IFK Norrköping	Released	
February 1999	MF	NED	Rogier Koordes	(Netherlands) FC Oss	Free transfer	
April 1999	MF	SCO	John McQuade	(Scotland) Raith Rovers	Free transfer	
May 1999	DF	ENG	Paul Beesley	Stockport County	Free transfer	
July 1999	DF	ENG	Dave Barnett	Lincoln City	Free transfer	
July 1999	DF	ENG	Paul Beesley	Blackpool	Free transfer	
August 1999	DF	NIR	Brian McGlinchey	Gillingham	Released	
Summer 1999	DF	ENG	Neil Aspin	Darlington	Free transfer	

=== Loans in ===
Date from	Position	Nationality	Name	From	Date to	Ref.
21 August 1998	MF	ENG	Scott Mean	West Ham United	23 August 1998	
28 August 1998	FW	ENG	Andy Clarke	Wimbledon	1 October 1998	
October 1998	MF	FRA	Christophe Horlaville	(France) Le Havre	January 1999	
November 1998	MF	NOR	Robin Berntsen	(Norway) Tromsø IL	November 1998	
19 November 1998	DF	ENG	Des Lyttle	Nottingham Forest	28 December 1998	
29 January 1999	FW	ENG	Craig Russell	Manchester City	End of season	
2 March 1999	FW	IRL	Alan Lee	Aston Villa	End of season	
24 March 1999	MF	ENG	Tommy Widdrington	Grimsby Town	End of season	
