= Stewart Talbot =

English footballer

Personal information
- Full name: Stewart Dean Talbot
- Date of birth: 14 June 1973 (age 53)
- Place of birth: Birmingham, England
- Height: 5 ft 11 in (1.80 m)
- Position: Midfielder

Senior career*
Years	Team	Apps	(Gls)
19??–1994	Moor Green		
1994–2000	Port Vale	137	(10)
2000–2004	Rotherham United	114	(8)
2003	→ Shrewsbury Town (loan)	5	(0)
2004–2005	Brentford	52	(3)
2005–2009	Boston United	48	(3)
2009	Kidsgrove Athletic		
Total		356	(24)

Managerial career
- 2009: Boston United (caretaker)
- * Club domestic league appearances and goals

Stewart Dean Talbot (born 14 June 1973) is an English former footballer who played as a midfielder. He made over 300 appearances in the Football League in an eleven-year professional career.

Starting his career with non-League side Moor Green, he was signed by Port Vale in 1994. After six years at Vale Park, he moved on to Rotherham United, where he spent four years. He played over 100 league games for each club. He then played over fifty games for Brentford before leaving the English Football League in 2005 to join Boston United. He spent four years at Boston before finishing his career at Kidsgrove Athletic.

== Career ==
=== Port Vale ===
Talbot played for Southern League side Moor Green and was due to sign for Doncaster Rovers when Rovers manager Ian Atkins was sacked, leaving Talbot without a club or employment as he had quit his job as sheet metal worker to turn professional with Doncaster. He instead entered the English Football League with Port Vale of the First Division in August 1994, signing after a period on trial. At the age of 21, he entered professional football at a late stage and was one of numerous players who owed their careers to John Rudge. His debut came on 29 April 1995, in a 1–1 draw with Charlton Athletic at The Valley. His contract was due to expire at the end of the 1994–95 season and Ian Atkins, now manager of Northampton Town, offered to double his money, but Rudge agreed to keep him on at Vale for the same terms as Northampton. However, the arrivals of Ian Bogie and Lee Mills restricted his first-team progress, whilst he also struggled with niggling injuries throughout the 1995–96 season.

He played in the 1996 Anglo-Italian Cup final, as Vale lost 5–2 to Genoa. By 1996–97, the club had reached its peak, though Talbot mainly played in the 4–5–1 formation at away matches, whilst Mills was utilised in the 4–4–2 formation at home. The club finished eighth in the second tier. Talbot played 34 games, including two Potteries derby clashes. He was in even greater demand the next season, making 45 appearances, justifying his reputation as a hard-working player. He also racked up 13 yellow cards and six goals. Two yellow cards were rescinded after referees advised The Football Association that they had made errors.

In 1998–99, he played 35 games, though he didn't find the scoresheet. He was at the club for the dismissal of manager John Rudge, who joked that injury-prone Michael Walsh and Talbot were responsible for his sacking as Walsh was "never fit" and Talbot was always fit. Talbot still found himself in the first-team with new man Brian Horton though, the club barely surviving relegation. On 27 April, in a 2–1 defeat by Watford at Vale Park, he was stretchered with a broken leg off after 33 minutes, following a challenge by Paul Robinson. The injury resulted in ten months out of action, needing a breakthrough motion fixation treatment to speed up the recovery process. It took ten months for him to regain match fitness. Four years later, he successfully sued Robinson and Watford F.C., settling out of court for "a substantial six-figure sum". The team fell well short in 1999–2000 however, going down in 23rd place. Talbot made it onto the pitch just six times following recovery from his injury, Vale salvaging just one point of a possible 18. His association with the Burslem club was over, after six seasons at Vale Park he moved on to Second Division new boys Rotherham United in July 2000.

=== Rotherham United ===
United won their second-successive promotion in 2000–01, again finishing runners-up. Talbot played 43 games of the campaign, picking up seven yellow cards and one straight red along the way. After another 40+ games season for Talbot, United finished above relegated Crewe Alexandra thanks to their superior goal difference and despite a 2–0 defeat at Gresty Road in late April. After a couple of runs in the 2002 half of the season, broken up by a persistent knee injury, Ronnie Moore dropped Talbot. In February he joined Shrewsbury Town of the Third Division on a one-month loan, playing seven games. On his return to Millmoor he was expected to re-join the "Shrews" in their battle to avoid the Conference National, but instead he found himself back in first-team contention with Rotherham, playing five games before the end of the season.

In 2003–04, he made 28 appearances, in which he was booked seven times and sent off once, including a run of four yellow cards in four games. By January time he was dropped yet again, in February he dropped down a division, joining Brentford on a 2 1/2-year contract on a free transfer.

=== Later career ===
Talbot's 37 League One appearances helped his new club to the play-off places in 2004–05, though they were bettered by Sheffield Wednesday in the semi-finals. Talbot told manager Martin Allen that he wanted to return to the North, he joined League Two side Boston United on a free transfer in June 2005. By now a veteran, he played 36 games in 2005–06. However, he hated working under manager Steve Evans, who he felt to be a bully.

It was a difficult decision because we had such a successful season last year and I really enjoyed it but, at the age of 32, I just felt I needed to look to the future and Boston offered me just the kind of long-term deal I was looking for, and I just couldn't turn it down....

— Talbot upon signing with Boston

In 2006–07 Boston lost their Football League status, Talbot making twenty appearances in his final season in the Football League. Only Talbot and Paul Ellender stayed beyond the summer. In 2007–08, the club were playing in the Conference North because of their financial difficulties. They were promptly kicked out of that division at the end of the season, leaving them with an intolerable fall from grace – effectively three relegations in just two seasons. So they started the 2008–09 season in the Northern Premier League. Talbot briefly managed United for one game against Nantwich Town on 5 January after manager Steve Welsh became ill. The team capitulated 5–0. Welsh released Talbot soon after, and the player signed for Kidsgrove Athletic (one level below in the Division One South). He left Kidsgrove in the summer of 2009.

== Style of play ==
The Rotherham United website states that Talbot was a "midfield dynamo" with "powerful tackling".

== Post-retirement ==
Since leaving the professional game, Talbot took up a position in child care in north Staffordshire. By 2015 he quit child care to become an overhead linesman with Network Rail in Crewe.

== Career statistics ==
Appearances and goals by club, season and competition
Club	Season	League			FA Cup		Other		Total	
Club	Season	Division	Apps	Goals	Apps	Goals	Apps	Goals	Apps	Goals
Port Vale	1994–95	First Division	2	0	0	0	0	0	2	0
Port Vale	1995–96	First Division	20	0	3	0	5	1	28	1
Port Vale	1996–97	First Division	34	4	0	0	2	0	36	4
Port Vale	1997–98	First Division	42	6	2	0	2	0	46	6
Port Vale	1998–99	First Division	33	0	0	0	2	0	35	0
Port Vale	1999–2000	First Division	6	0	0	0	0	0	6	0
Port Vale	Total		137	10	5	0	11	1	153	11
Rotherham United	2000–01	Second Division	38	5	3	0	2	0	43	5
Rotherham United	2001–02	First Division	38	1	2	0	1	0	41	1
Rotherham United	2002–03	First Division	15	1	0	0	0	0	15	1
Rotherham United	2003–04	First Division	23	1	2	0	5	0	30	1
Rotherham United	Total		114	8	7	0	8	0	129	8
Shrewsbury Town (loan)	2002–03	Third Division	5	0	0	0	2	0	7	0
Brentford	2003–04	Second Division	15	2	0	0	0	0	15	2
Brentford	2004–05	League One	37	1	9	1	3	0	49	2
Brentford	Total		52	3	9	1	3	0	64	4
Boston United	2005–06	League Two	30	2	3	1	3	0	36	3
Boston United	2006–07	League Two	18	1	0	0	2	0	20	1
Boston United	Total		48	3	3	1	5	0	56	4
Career total			356	24	24	2	29	1	409	27

== Honours ==
Port Vale

- Anglo-Italian Cup runner-up: 1996

Rotherham United

- Football League Second Division second-place promotion: 2000–01
