= Jermaine Holwijn =

Dutch footballer (born 1973)

Personal information
- Full name: Jermaine Titano Benito Holwijn
- Date of birth: 16 April 1973 (age 53)
- Place of birth: Amsterdam, Netherlands
- Height: 6 ft 2 in (1.88 m)
- Position: Defender

Youth career
- Amstelland
- Zeeburgin
- Abcoude

Senior career*
Years	Team	Apps	(Gls)
1994–1995	Ajax	0	(0)
1995–1998	Port Vale	7	(0)
1998–2001	Haarlem	72	(1)
2001–2003	Volendam	45	(1)
2003–2006	DOVO		
2006–2010	Katwijk		
Total		124	(2)
- * Club domestic league appearances and goals

Jermaine Titano Benito Holwijn (born 16 April 1973) is a Dutch former professional footballer who played as a defender for English club Port Vale, and Dutch clubs Haarlem and Volendam.

== Career ==
Holwijn played for Amstelland, Zeeburgin, Abcoude and Ajax Amsterdam before being purchased by English First Division side Port Vale in May 1995 for a £5,000 fee. He made his debut in a friendly at Newcastle Town on 16 July 1995. However, he was stretchered off with cartilage and cruciate ligament damage to his knee after just ten minutes. After undergoing surgery in September 1995, he was sidelined for the rest of the season. He made his debut at Vale Park on 19 January 1997 in a 4–4 draw with Queens Park Rangers, scoring a 66th minute own goal as he inadvertently helped QPR recover a 4–0 deficit. He made just six further appearances in the 1996–97 season, before manager John Rudge allowed him to return to Holland with HFC Haarlem in 1998. He joined Volendam in 2001 and turned to amateur football when he joined DOVO.

== Career statistics ==
Appearances and goals by club, season and competition
Club	Season	League			National cup (Note: Includes FA Cup, KNVB Cup)		Other		Total	
Club	Season	Division	Apps	Goals	Apps	Goals	Apps	Goals	Apps	Goals
Port Vale	1996–97	First Division	7	0	0	0	0	0	7	0
Haarlem	1998–99	Eerste Divisie	12	0	1	0	—		13	0
Haarlem	1999–2000	Eerste Divisie	31	0	0	0	—		31	0
Haarlem	2000–01	Eerste Divisie	29	1	0	0	—		29	1
Haarlem	Total		72	1	1	0	0	0	73	1
Volendam	2001–02	Eerste Divisie	18	0	0	0	2 (Note: Appearance(s) in play-offs)	0	20	0
Volendam	2002–03	Eerste Divisie	27	1	0	0	5	0	27	1
Volendam	Total		45	1	0	0	7	0	52	1
