= Scott Williams (footballer) =

Welsh footballer

Personal information
- Full name: Scott John Williams
- Date of birth: 7 August 1974 (age 52)
- Place of birth: Bangor, Gwynedd, Wales
- Position: Left-back

Youth career
- Wrexham

Senior career*
Years	Team	Apps	(Gls)
1992–1998	Wrexham	32	(0)
- Congleton Town
1999–2002	Leek Town	70	(3)
- Airbus UK Broughton
- * Club domestic league appearances and goals

Scott John Williams (born 7 August 1974) is a Welsh former professional footballer who played as a left-back. He made appearances for Wrexham in the English Football League.

He also played non-league football for Congleton Town and Leek Town, making 70 appearances for the latter. He also played in the Welsh league for Airbus UK Broughton.
