= Matt Carragher =

English footballer (1976–2016)

Personal information
- Full name: Matthew Carragher
- Date of birth: 14 January 1976
- Place of birth: Liverpool, England
- Date of death: 28 December 2016 (aged 40)
- Height: 5 ft 9 in (1.75 m)
- Position: Defender

Youth career
- Wigan Athletic

Senior career*
Years	Team	Apps	(Gls)
1993–1997	Wigan Athletic	119	(0)
1997–2003	Port Vale	194	(1)
2003	Stafford Rangers	8	(0)
2003–2005	Macclesfield Town	49	(0)
Total		362	(1)
- * Club domestic league appearances and goals

Matthew Carragher (14 January 1976 – 28 December 2016) was an English footballer who played 422 league and cup games over twelve years in the Football League. He was a versatile defender and was described as "a natural leader".

He began his career with Wigan Athletic in 1993. He made 119 league appearances in four years at the club, helping the "Latics" to the Third Division title in 1996–97. He then switched to Port Vale. He was later made club captain and led the "Valiants" to victory in the Football League Trophy in 2001. He was released in May 2003. Following a brief spell at Stafford Rangers, he spent two years with Macclesfield Town before retiring in 2005.

== Career ==
=== Wigan Athletic ===
Carragher started his career at Wigan Athletic after coming through the ranks at the Latics School of Excellence and made his debut in a 6–3 win over Chester City in October 1993. Kenny Swain's "Latics" then finished the 1993–94 campaign fourth from bottom of the Third Division. New boss Graham Barrow then led the Springfield Park club to 14th in 1994–95, before he was replaced by John Deehan. Wigan finished 10th in 1995–96, two points behind Colchester United in the play-off zone. Carragher made 16 appearances in 1996–97, as Wigan were crowned of the Third Division, finishing above Fulham on goal difference.

=== Port Vale ===
He moved on to Port Vale in 1997 after John Rudge judged Carragher to be a potential replacement for the ageing Dean Glover and Neil Aspin. He made 25 First Division appearances in 1997–98, helping the "Valiants" to beat Huddersfield Town 4–0 on the final day of the season to avoid relegation by one point, at the expense of Manchester City and Potteries derby rivals Stoke City. He won the club's Young Player of the year award. However, he featured just 12 times in 1998–99, and was not selected once by new boss Brian Horton. He was though named as the club's Clubman of the Year.

He scored his first goal at Vale Park on 25 September 1999, in a 2–0 win over Swindon Town, and went on to play 39 games as Vale were relegated to the Second Division at the end of the 1999–2000 season. He played 56 of the club's 57 games in 2000–01, playing as a sweeper in a defence of Michael Walsh, Sagi Burton, Allen Tankard, and goalkeeper Mark Goodlad. He also captained the "Valiants" at the Football League Trophy final at the Millennium Stadium, which finished as a 2–1 win over Brentford. He continued to lead the back line in 2001–02, making 47 appearances. He scored only his second goal for the club on 22 October 2002, in a 3–1 home win over Hull City in the Football League Trophy. Despite making 40 appearances in 2002–03, being one of only three settled defenders (the others being Sam Collins and Ian Brightwell), he was surprisingly released by Horton in May 2003.

=== Later career ===
Following his release from Vale, Carragher joined Stafford Rangers on non-contract terms, playing eight Southern League games, whilst Burton Albion boss Nigel Clough considered whether or not to make him an offer. Instead he signed for Macclesfield Town in November 2003. He played 18 games in 2003–04, as the "Silkmen" avoided relegation into the Conference by three places and seven points; manager John Askey was replaced by Brian Horton in April 2004. He played 39 games in 2004–05 and featured in the play-off semi-final defeat to Lincoln City, but Horton released him from his contract at Moss Rose in May 2005.

== Style of play ==
Carragher was a versatile defender who could play as a left-back, right-back or sweeper. He was described as "a natural leader".

== Personal life and death ==
His father was a semi-professional footballer. He had three older sisters. Carragher married childhood sweetheart Louise Morgan in 2001. Carragher died of cancer on 29 December 2016 at the age of 40. Former teammate Tony Naylor paid tribute to him as a "a cheeky chappie, a typical Scouse lad, confident and a nice guy with it".

== Career statistics ==
Appearances and goals by club, season and competition
Club	Season	League			FA Cup		Other		Total	
Club	Season	Division	Apps	Goals	Apps	Goals	Apps	Goals	Apps	Goals
Wigan Athletic	1993–94	Third Division	32	0	4	0	2	0	38	0
Wigan Athletic	1994–95	Third Division	41	0	2	2	7	1	50	3
Wigan Athletic	1995–96	Third Division	28	0	4	0	4	0	36	0
Wigan Athletic	1996–97	Third Division	18	0	1	0	2	0	21	0
Wigan Athletic	Total		119	0	11	2	15	1	145	3
Port Vale	1997–98	First Division	26	0	0	0	0	0	26	0
Port Vale	1998–99	First Division	10	0	0	0	2	0	12	0
Port Vale	1999–2000	First Division	37	1	0	0	2	0	39	1
Port Vale	2000–01	Second Division	45	0	2	0	9	0	56	0
Port Vale	2001–02	Second Division	41	0	2	0	4	0	47	0
Port Vale	2002–03	Second Division	35	0	1	0	4	1	40	1
Port Vale	Total		194	1	5	0	21	1	220	2
Macclesfield Town	2003–04	Third Division	18	0	0	0	0	0	18	0
Macclesfield Town	2004–05	League Two	31	0	3	0	5	0	39	0
Macclesfield Town	Total		49	0	3	0	5	0	57	0
Career total			362	1	19	2	41	2	422	5

== Honours ==
Wigan Athletic

- Football League Third Division: 1996–97

Port Vale

- Football League Trophy: 2000–01
