= 2000–01 Port Vale F.C. season =

Port Vale F.C.
2000–01 season
- Chairman: Bill Bell
- Manager: Brian Horton
- Stadium: Vale Park
- Football League Second Division: 11th (62 points)
- FA Cup: First Round (eliminated by Canvey Island)
- League Cup: First Round (eliminated by Chesterfield)
- Football League Trophy: Winners
- Player of the Year: Dave Brammer
- Top goalscorer: League: Tony Naylor (15); All: Tony Naylor (21)
- Highest home attendance: 8,948 vs. Stoke City, 17 September 2000
- Lowest home attendance: 1,919 vs. Notts County, 9 January 2001
- Average home league attendance: 4,458
- Biggest win: 5–0 vs. Peterborough United, 10 March 2001
- Biggest defeat: 0–4 vs. Cambridge United, 12 September 2000
Home colours	Away colours

The 2000–01 season was Port Vale's 89th season of football in the English Football League and first season back (thirty-eighth overall) in the Second Division. Managed by Brian Horton and chaired by Bill Bell, Vale began the campaign poorly, languishing near the foot of the table and suffering a sensational First Round FA Cup exit at home to Isthmian League minnows Canvey Island, in what is widely regarded as one of the great shocks in Cup history. They also fell at the First Round stage of the League Cup, both major landmarks underlining an ominous start.

However, the season turned decisively after mid‑winter. A dramatic 12-match unbeaten run in the league lifted Vale into mid‑table safety, and their resurgence culminated in winning the Football League Trophy, defeating Brentford 2–1 in the final at the Millennium Stadium. It was the second time the club lifted the trophy, with goals from Marc Bridge-Wilkinson and Steve Brooker sealing the victory in front of over 25,000 fans.

Off the pitch, Vale’s financial situation was strained. Despite on‑field recovery, average league attendance slipped to around 4,458, while fans increasingly protested against chairman Bill Bell as rumours of a merger with Potteries derby rivals Stoke City surfaced amid stalled stadium development. Tony Naylor finished the season as both league top scorer (15) and overall top scorer (21) for Vale. The club managed to stabilise with a solid 11th‑place finish and the silverware lift, but underlying off‑field tensions remained unresolved.

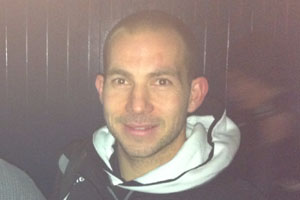
Key player Marc Bridge-Wilkinson.

== Overview ==
=== Second Division ===
The pre-season saw Brian Horton sign Irish goalkeeper Dean Delany (Everton); midfielder Marc Bridge-Wilkinson (Derby County); and Michael Twiss (Manchester United) – all on free transfers. He also brought in David Freeman on a loan deal from Nottingham Forest, as well as David Beresford from Huddersfield Town. Horton also signed South African striker Sinclair Le Geyt on a one-month contract. However, he would not make a first-team appearance. On the eve of the season, top scorer Tony Rougier was sold to Reading for £325,000.

The season opened with a disappointing 4–1 defeat at Boundary Park to Oldham Athletic, though the Vale then recovered to record two 3–0 victories. Two points from the next seven games follow, turning hopes of promotion into fears of relegation and putting pressure onto Horton. During this run the Vale renewed hostilities with rivals Stoke City, recording a 1–1 draw at Burslem on 17 September. Their form stabilised with a four-game unbeaten run throughout November, but no points were gained from any of the four December games. Horton attempted to sign Isaiah Rankin on loan from Bradford City, but Bill Bell rejected the move as he felt the wage bill was already too high.

In January, young striker Steve Brooker was signed from Watford for a £15,000 fee. He debuted on the 6th, in a 0–0 draw at home to Oldham Athletic as Horton tried a 3–5–2 formation. Jamaican international striker Onandi Lowe also arrived on a short-team deal, and Wayne Gray joined on loan from Wimbledon. In February, Vale then found their feet and managed to avoid defeat to Stoke at the Britannia Stadium, losing just three of their final 21 league games. In March, Jeff Minton was transferred to Rotherham United, and Ashley Dodd arrived at Vale Park on loan from Manchester United. On 3 March, Vale won 1–0 away at Wycombe Wanderers thanks to a 57th-minute Brooker goal. Seven days later, Vale recorded a 5–0 home win over Peterborough United with five different scorers after Horton named the same first XI for the fourth consecutive game.

On 24 March, Liam Burns replaced an injured Mark Goodlad in goal 28 minutes into a home fixture with Wigan Athletic and a solid defensive performance helped the outfield player to retain a clean sheet. The next month Richard Burgess also joined the club after leaving Bromsgrove Rovers. A cup run and numerous fixture postponements meant the club were forced to play eight games in April, of which only two ended in defeat; for this achievement, Horton was named Manager of the Month. The 1 May draw with Manor Ground was the final match in the stadium's 125-year history. Two days later, in the final home game of the season, Billy Paynter made his debut aged only 16 years and 294 days.

They finished in eleventh place with 62 points, some distance from the play-off and the relegation zones. They finished six places and 15 points away from Stoke, who went on to lose in the play-offs. Tony Naylor was the club's top-scorer with 21 goals in all competitions, with new players Bridge-Wilkinson and Brooker also hitting double figures.

At the end of the season numerous players left the club: seven-year club legend and top-scorer Tony Naylor (Cheltenham Town); eight-year club veteran Allen Tankard (Mansfield Town); former Player of the Year Tommy Widdrington (Hartlepool United); Alex Smith (Reading); Richard Eyre (Macclesfield Town); Dele Olaoye (Stafford Rangers); and Michael Twiss (Leigh RMI). Dave Brammer was also sold to Crewe Alexandra for £500,000 – a move that highly upset many Vale fans.

=== Finances ===
The wage bill was cut by 30%. Before the season began director Peter Wright quit the club, though Bell said he had been sacked. Work on the Lorne Street stand stopped as the club ran out of money to complete the project. Vale were in a financial crisis, and fans protested against chairman Bill Bell. There were rumours of a merger with Stoke City, as the media reported the possible financial collapse of the club. A rare positive note was a £250,000 five-year sponsorship deal with the Bass Brewery. Local barrister Charles Machin was appointed onto the club board in July 2000, and in November stated that "my 10-year ambition is to see the Vale in the top five clubs in Europe. It is my profound belief the power of God will help get the Vale to the top." Machin handed Brian Horton a 60-section questionnaire on each player on the team every two weeks and was branded as "belligerent, uncooperative and bizarre" by the League Managers Association.

In October, Machin told the press that he would sack Horton if the club had the money to pay for his severance package; meanwhile, marketing manager Rob Edwards resigned after less than two months on the job. Machin quit the club in November and two months later set up 'Valiant2001', a fan-based consortium looking to buy the club off Bill Bell. Former vice-chairman Mike Thompstone also attempted a takeover of the club, which Bell resisted. The Valiant2001 project took off with Machin at the helm, who said he should be the new chairman as "I can't think of anyone I trust more than myself". The project raised £73,000 by June, and Thompstone also pledged his support. Ex-director Stephen Plant also sued the Bell and the club in November and made a £100,000 settlement in May. Another director, shopkeeper Neil Hughes, resigned in February; he returned to the club the next month, only to resign for a second time in six weeks. Dave Jolley (who had previously resigned at Stockport County after proposing a move to Maine Road) was appointed Chief Executive in February. The club's shirt sponsors were Tunstall Assurance.

=== Cup competitions ===
In the FA Cup, Vale suffered humiliation. Leading 2–0 at half-time despite having missed a penalty kick, they reached full-time with a 4–4 draw at non-League Canvey Island after two last-minute Canvey goals from Andy Jones and Wayne Vaughan. Back at Vale Park, the game was goalless after normal time, and Canvey scored two extra time goals to win the match 2–1, with a last-second strike from Naylor being a mere consolation. Vale responded to the humiliation by putting five players on the transfer list: Liam Burns, Ville Viljanen, Sagi Burton, Jeff Minton and Michael Twiss.

For the third consecutive season in the League Cup, Vale lost in the first round to a Third Division side, this time Chesterfield. After a 2–1 defeat at Saltergate, Chesterfield held on to a 2–2 draw in Burslem.

In the Football League Trophy, the Vale eased past Notts County with a 3–0 win. Brooker scored his first goal in senior football in what was his second appearance for the club. The result ended Vale's sequence of 18 cup games without a victory. They then faced Chester City of the Conference, who they defeated 2–0. The area quarter-final also proved to be no challenge for Vale, as they triumphed 4–0 over Darlington. The semi-final stage held a real challenge however, with the match against rivals Stoke City held at the Britannia Stadium despite the draw giving Vale a home tie. Cummins put Vale ahead before Nicky Mohan equalized to take the match into extra-time. A 105th minute Bridge-Wilkinson penalty put Vale into the regional final. It was a two-legged affair with Lincoln City, and Vale were the victors with a 2–0 win at Sincil Bank, thanks to goals from Bridge-Wilkinson and Naylor. Brentford awaited in the final at the Millennium Stadium. Vale lifted the trophy for the second time with a 2–1 victory, Bridge-Wilkinson and Steve Brooker scoring the goals on a rainy day in front of 25,654 spectators at the Millennium Stadium; Brooker scored the game's opening goal from the penalty spot after Naylor was fouled by Darren Powell on 77 minutes. It was also Naylor who provided the assist for Brooker's winner six minutes later.

== Results ==
=== Football League Second Division ===
==== League table ====
Pos	Team	Pld	W	D	L	GF	GA	GD	Pts
9	Bristol City	46	18	14	14	70	56	+14	68
10	Wrexham	46	17	12	17	65	71	−6	63
11	Port Vale	46	16	14	16	55	49	+6	62
12	Peterborough United	46	15	14	17	61	66	−5	59
13	Wycombe Wanderers	46	15	14	17	46	53	−7	59

Rules for classification: 1) Points; 2) Goal difference; 3) Goals scored

==== Results by matchday ====
Round	1	2	3	4	5	6	7	8	9	10	11	12	13	14	15	16	17	18	19	20	21	22	23	24	25	26	27	28	29	30	31	32	33	34	35	36	37	38	39	40	41	42	43	44	45	46
Ground	A	H	H	H	A	A	H	A	H	A	H	H	A	H	A	H	H	A	H	H	A	H	A	A	A	H	A	H	H	A	A	H	H	A	A	H	H	A	A	H	A	H	A	A	H	A
Result	L	W	W	L	D	L	D	L	L	L	W	D	L	D	W	D	W	L	L	L	L	D	W	L	L	W	D	W	D	W	W	W	D	W	D	D	W	L	D	W	W	L	W	D	L	D
Position	24	10	7	11	12	16	16	17	20	21	18	17	20	20	18	17	18	20	21	21	22	22	20	21	21	20	20	20	19	19	18	18	19	16	17	17	16	17	16	12	13	14	11	11	11	11
Points	0	3	6	6	7	7	8	8	8	8	11	12	12	13	16	17	20	20	20	20	20	21	24	24	24	27	28	31	32	35	38	41	42	45	46	47	50	50	51	54	57	57	60	61	61	62

Source: Statto
A = Away; H = Home; W = Win; D = Draw; L = Loss

==== Matches ====
12 August 2000 1	Oldham Athletic	4–1	Port Vale	Oldham
	Adams 29'; Allott 36'; Corazzin 69'; Garnett 72'	Report	Twiss 67'	Stadium: Boundary Park; Attendance: 5,639; Referee: Mike Dean

19 August 2000 2	Port Vale	3–0	Oxford United	Burslem
	Naylor 29'; Bridge-Wilkinson 65', 67'	Report		Stadium: Vale Park; Attendance: 3,814; Referee: Alan Butler

28 August 2000 3	Port Vale	3–0	Swindon Town	Burslem
	Naylor 27', 90'; Smith 55'	Report		Stadium: Vale Park; Attendance: 3,926; Referee: Roy Pearson

2 September 2000 4	Port Vale	0–1	Reading	Burslem
		Report	Cureton 5'	Stadium: Vale Park; Attendance: 4,701; Referee: Steve Baines

9 September 2000 5	AFC Bournemouth	1–1	Port Vale	Bournemouth
	Fletcher 86'	Report	Viljanen 34'	Stadium: Dean Court; Attendance: 3,859; Referee: Steve Tomlin

12 September 2000 6	Cambridge United	4–0	Port Vale	Cambridge
	Wanless 20' (pen.); Russell 64'; Youngs 71'; Slade 87'	Report		Stadium: Abbey Stadium; Attendance: 3,660; Referee: Uriah Rennie

17 September 2000 7	Port Vale	1–1	Stoke City	Burslem
	Bridge-Wilkinson 11'	Report	Lightbourne 15'	Stadium: Vale Park; Attendance: 8,948; Referee: William Burns

23 September 2000 8	Bury	2–0	Port Vale	Bury, Greater Manchester
	Carragher 33' (og.); Daws 71'	Report		Stadium: Gigg Lane; Attendance: 3,176; Referee: Mark Cowburn

30 September 2000 9	Port Vale	0–1	Wycombe Wanderers	Burslem
		Report	Rammell 21'	Stadium: Vale Park; Attendance: 3,615; Referee: Trevor Jones

8 October 2000 10	Peterborough United	2–0	Port Vale	Peterborough
	Lee 67'; Clarke 87'	Report		Stadium: London Road Stadium; Attendance: 4,752; Referee: Trevor Parkes; Assistant referees: C. Francis, R. Jones; Fourth official: S. Clingo

14 October 2000 11	Port Vale	3–1	Colchester United	Burslem
	Tankard 4'; Naylor 68', 76'	Report	Scott 63'	Stadium: Vale Park; Attendance: 3,192; Referee: David Pugh

17 October 2000 12	Port Vale	2–2	Northampton Town	Burslem
	Tankard 11'; Viljanen 61'	Report	Forrester 5'; Gabbiadini 32'	Stadium: Vale Park; Attendance: 4,215; Referee: Mike Pike

21 October 2000 13	Wigan Athletic	1–0	Port Vale	Wigan
	Liddell 76'	Report		Stadium: JJB Stadium; Attendance: 6,275; Referee: Scott Mathieson

24 October 2000 14	Port Vale	1–1	Brentford	Burslem
	Widdrington 65'	Report	Owusu 89'	Stadium: Vale Park; Attendance: 3,338; Referee: Phil Prosser

28 October 2000 15	Swansea City	0–1	Port Vale	Swansea
		Report	Cummins 19'	Stadium: Vetch Field; Attendance: 3,715; Referee: Mike Ryan

4 November 2000 16	Port Vale	1–1	Millwall	Burslem
	Brammer 79'	Report	Livermore 68'	Stadium: Vale Park; Attendance: 4,559; Referee: Graham Frankland

25 November 2000 17	Port Vale	3–0	Luton Town	Burslem
	Walsh 34'; Naylor 64'; Minton 70'	Report		Stadium: Vale Park; Attendance: 4,194; Referee: Alan Kaye

2 December 2000 18	Walsall	2–1	Port Vale	Walsall
	Matías 35'; Keates 50' (pen.)	Report	O'Callaghan 78'	Stadium: Bescot Stadium; Attendance: 5,597; Referee: Mark Clattenburg

16 December 2000 19	Port Vale	1–2	Bristol City	Burslem
	Bridge-Wilkinson 59'	Report	Peacock 19', 87' (pen.)	Stadium: Vale Park; Attendance: 4,113; Referee: Paul Robinson

22 December 2000 20	Port Vale	0–2	Rotherham United	Burslem
		Report	Robins 33'; Hurst 77'	Stadium: Vale Park; Attendance: 4,110; Referee: Eddie Wolstenholme

26 December 2000 21	Wrexham	1–0	Port Vale	Wrexham
	Faulconbridge 9'	Report		Stadium: Racecourse Ground; Attendance: 4,941; Referee: Matt Messias

6 January 2001 22	Port Vale	0–0	Oldham Athletic	Burslem
		Report		Stadium: Vale Park; Attendance: 4,313; Referee: Mark Cooper

13 January 2001 23	Swindon Town	0–1	Port Vale	Swindon
		Report	Widdrington 83'	Stadium: County Ground; Attendance: 5,175; Referee: Andy Hall

27 January 2001 24	Rotherham United	3–2	Port Vale	Rotherham
	Robins 24'; Lee 74'; Warne 90'	Report	Cummins 62'; Brooker 85'	Stadium: Millmoor; Attendance: 5,044; Referee: David Pugh

3 February 2001 25	Reading	1–0	Port Vale	Reading, Berkshire
	Butler 78'	Report		Stadium: Madejski Stadium; Attendance: 9,026; Referee: Mike North

10 February 2001 26	Port Vale	2–1	AFC Bournemouth	Burslem
	Naylor 7'; Brisco 90'	Report	Tindall 67'	Stadium: Vale Park; Attendance: 3,956; Referee: Scott Mathieson

17 February 2001 27	Stoke City	1–1	Port Vale	Stoke-on-Trent
	O'Connor 55'	Report	Brammer 81'	Stadium: Britannia Stadium; Attendance: 22,133; Referee: Paul Danson

20 February 2001 28	Port Vale	4–2	Cambridge United	Burslem
	Bridge-Wilkinson 31' (pen.); Lowe 33'; Naylor 45'; Brooker 90'	Report	Humphreys 7', 51'	Stadium: Vale Park; Attendance: 3,558; Referee: Paul Alcock

24 February 2001 29	Port Vale	1–1	Bury	Burslem
	Bridge-Wilkinson 41'	Report	Cramb 57'	Stadium: Vale Park; Attendance: 4,331; Referee: Ray Olivier

3 March 2001 30	Wycombe Wanderers	0–1	Port Vale	High Wycombe
		Report	Brooker 57'	Stadium: Adams Park; Attendance: 4,828; Referee: Paul Taylor

7 March 2001 31	Colchester United	0–1	Port Vale	Colchester
		Report	Brammer 54'	Stadium: Layer Road; Attendance: 2,579; Referee: Paul Robinson

10 March 2001 32	Port Vale	5–0	Peterborough United	Burslem
	Naylor 20'; Tankard 57'; Smith 59'; Bridge-Wilkinson 82' (pen.); Twiss 90'	Report		Stadium: Vale Park; Attendance: 4,787; Referee: Tony Leake

24 March 2001 33	Port Vale	0–0	Wigan Athletic	Burslem
13:00 GMT		Report		Stadium: Vale Park; Attendance: 5,017; Referee: Bill Jordan

27 March 2001 34	Notts County	0–1	Port Vale	Nottingham
		Report	Brooker 86'	Stadium: Meadow Lane; Attendance: 4,603; Referee: Neale Barry

31 March 2001 35	Bristol City	1–1	Port Vale	Ashton Gate, Bristol
	Murray 80'	Report	Brooker 29'	Stadium: Ashton Gate; Attendance: 11,782; Referee: Phil Joslin

3 April 2001 36	Port Vale	1–1	Wrexham	Burslem
	Naylor 67'	Report	Gibson 29'	Stadium: Vale Park; Attendance: 4,234; Referee: Roger Furnandiz

9 April 2001 37	Port Vale	1–0	Bristol Rovers	Burslem
	Naylor 73'	Report		Stadium: Vale Park; Attendance: 3,962; Referee: Keith Hill

11 April 2001 38	Millwall	1–0	Port Vale	Bermondsey, Southwark
	Sadlier 17'	Report		Stadium: The Den; Attendance: 11,944; Referee: Mark Warren

14 April 2001 39	Brentford	1–1	Port Vale	Brentford, West London
	Evans 2'	Report	Bridge-Wilkinson 83' (pen.)	Stadium: Griffin Park; Attendance: 3,671; Referee: Jeff Winter

16 April 2001 40	Port Vale	1–0	Swansea City	Burslem
	Brooker 10'	Report		Stadium: Vale Park; Attendance: 4,396; Referee: Frazer Stretton

26 April 2001 41	Northampton Town	0–2	Port Vale	Northampton
		Report	Naylor 13'; Brooker 15'	Stadium: Sixfields Stadium; Attendance: 4,775; Referee: David Crick

28 April 2001 42	Port Vale	2–3	Notts County	Burslem
	Brooker 16', 75'	Report	Allsopp 10', 83' (pen.); Owers 45'	Stadium: Vale Park; Attendance: 5,236; Referee: Steve Tomlin

30 April 2001 43	Bristol Rovers	0–3	Port Vale	Bristol
		Report	Naylor 73', 89'; Bridge-Wilkinson 79'	Stadium: Memorial Stadium; Attendance: 7,340; Referee: Peter Walton

1 May 2001 44	Oxford United	1–1	Port Vale	Oxford
	Scott 82'	Report	Naylor 89'	Stadium: Manor Ground; Attendance: 7,080; Referee: David Laws

3 May 2001 45	Port Vale	0–2	Walsall	Burslem
		Report	Goodman 50'; Tillson 67'	Stadium: Vale Park; Attendance: 6,027; Referee: Graham Laws

5 May 2001 46	Luton Town	1–1	Port Vale	Luton
	Howard 15'	Report	Tankard 16'	Stadium: Kenilworth Road; Attendance: 5,260; Referee: Mike Pike

=== FA Cup ===
19 November 2000 R1	Canvey Island	4–4	Port Vale	Canvey Island
	Smith 48'; Tilson 52' (pen.); Jones 89'; Vaughan 90'	Report	Minton 7', 76'; Brammer 35'; Bridge-Wilkinson 49'	Stadium: Park Lane; Attendance: 2,100; Referee: Mike Jones

28 November 2000 Replay	Port Vale	1–2 (a.e.t.)	Canvey Island	Burslem
	Naylor 120'	Report	Gregory 105'; Vaughan 119'	Stadium: Vale Park; Attendance: 3,566; Referee: Mike Jones

=== League Cup ===
22 August 2000 R1 1st Leg	Chesterfield	2–1	Port Vale	Chesterfield, Derbyshire
	Breckin 6'; Beckett 24'	Report	Burton 20'	Stadium: Saltergate; Attendance: 3,485; Referee: Paul Rejer

5 September 2000 R1 2nd Leg	Port Vale	2–2 (a.e.t.) (3–4 agg.)	Chesterfield	Burslem
	Bridge-Wilkinson 76'; Minton 78'	Report	Beckett 68'; Reeves 119'	Stadium: Vale Park; Attendance: 3,480; Referee: Richard Beeby

=== Football League Trophy ===
9 January 2001 R1	Port Vale	3–0	Notts County	Burslem
	Smith 8'; Brooker 45'; Naylor 59'	Report		Stadium: Vale Park; Attendance: 1,919; Referee: George Cain

30 January 2001 R2	Port Vale	2–0	Chester City	Burslem
	Doughty 21' (og.); Naylor 65'	Report		Stadium: Vale Park; Attendance: 2,507; Referee: Mike Ryan

6 February 2001 Northern Section Quarter-final	Port Vale	4–0	Darlington	Burslem
	Lowe 26'; Tankard 59'; Naylor 70', 74'	Report		Stadium: Vale Park; Attendance: 2,480; Referee: Mark Warren

5 March 2001 Northern Section Semi-final	Port Vale	2g–1 (a.e.t.)	Stoke City	Stoke-on-Trent
	Cummins 64'; Bridge-Wilkinson 104' (pen.)	Report	Mohan 87'	Stadium: Britannia Stadium; Attendance: 11,323; Referee: Matt Messias

13 March 2001 Northern Area Final 1st Leg	Lincoln City	0–2	Port Vale	Lincoln
		Report	Bridge-Wilkinson 53'; Naylor 85'	Stadium: Sincil Bank; Attendance: 4,813; Referee: Roy Pearson

20 March 2001 Northern Area Final 2nd Leg	Port Vale	0–0 (2–0 agg.)	Lincoln City	Burslem
		Report		Stadium: Vale Park; Attendance: 5,172; Referee: Uriah Rennie

22 April 2001 Final	Brentford	1–2	Port Vale	Cardiff
15:00 BST	Dobson 3'	Report	Bridge-Wilkinson 76' (pen.); Brooker 83'	Stadium: Millennium Stadium; Attendance: 25,654; Referee: William Burns; Man of the Match: Dave Brammer

== Squad statistics ==
=== Appearances and goals ===
Key to positions: GK – Goalkeeper; DF – Defender; MF – Midfielder; FW – Forward

No.	Pos	Nat	Player	Total		Second Division		FA Cup		League Cup		Football League Trophy	
No.	Pos	Nat	Player	Apps	Goals	Apps	Goals	Apps	Goals	Apps	Goals	Apps	Goals
1	GK	(England) ENG	Mark Goodlad	50	0	40	0	2	0	2	0	6	0
2	DF	(England) ENG	Matt Carragher	56	0	45	0	2	0	2	0	7	0
3	DF	(England) ENG	Allen Tankard	39	5	33	4	1	0	2	0	3	1
4	MF	(England) ENG	Dave Brammer	44	4	35	3	2	1	0	0	7	0
5	DF	(England) ENG	Michael Walsh	47	1	39	1	1	0	0	0	7	0
6	DF	(Saint Kitts and Nevis) SKN	Sagi Burton	37	1	29	0	1	0	2	1	5	0
7	FW	(Jamaica) JAM	Onandi Lowe	6	2	5	1	0	0	0	0	1	1
8	MF	(Republic of Ireland) IRL	Micky Cummins	56	3	45	2	2	0	2	0	7	1
9	FW	(Finland) FIN	Ville Viljanen	23	2	19	2	1	0	2	0	1	0
10	FW	(England) ENG	Tony Naylor	53	21	42	15	2	1	2	0	7	5
11	MF	(England) ENG	Tommy Widdrington	41	2	35	2	1	0	2	0	3	0
12	GK	(England) ENG	Dean Delany	10	0	9	0	0	0	0	0	1	0
14	MF	(England) ENG	Richard Eyre	8	0	6	0	0	0	1	0	1	0
15	MF	(England) ENG	Marc Bridge-Wilkinson	52	14	42	9	2	1	1	1	7	3
17	MF	(England) ENG	Neil Brisco	22	1	17	1	0	0	0	0	5	0
18	MF	(Republic of Ireland) IRL	George O'Callaghan	10	1	8	1	1	0	0	0	1	0
19	DF	(England) ENG	Alex Smith	47	3	37	2	2	0	1	0	7	1
20	DF	(England) ENG	Paul Donnelly	1	0	1	0	0	0	0	0	0	0
21	DF	(Northern Ireland) NIR	Liam Burns	15	0	13	0	1	0	0	0	1	0
22	DF	(England) ENG	Paul Taylor	0	0	0	0	0	0	0	0	0	0
23	MF	(England) ENG	Michael Twiss	24	2	18	2	2	0	2	0	2	0
24	FW	(Nigeria) NGR	Dele Olaoye	1	0	1	0	0	0	0	0	0	0
25	FW	(England) ENG	Steve Brooker	28	11	23	9	0	0	0	0	5	2
26	MF	(South Africa) RSA	Paul Byrne	1	0	1	0	0	0	0	0	0	0
27	FW	(England) ENG	Richard Burgess	1	0	1	0	0	0	0	0	0	0
28	MF	(England) ENG	Ashley Dodd	3	0	3	0	0	0	0	0	0	0
29	FW	(England) ENG	Billy Paynter	1	0	1	0	0	0	0	0	0	0
Players who featured but departed the club during the season:
7	MF	(Trinidad and Tobago) TTO	Tony Rougier	0	0	0	0	0	0	0	0	0	0
7	MF	(Republic of Ireland) IRL	David Freeman	3	0	3	0	0	0	0	0	0	0
7	FW	(England) ENG	Wayne Gray	3	0	3	0	0	0	0	0	0	0
13	MF	(England) ENG	David Beresford	4	0	4	0	0	0	0	0	0	0
16	MF	(England) ENG	Jeff Minton	19	4	13	1	2	2	2	1	2	0
	FW	(South Africa) RSA	Sinclair Le Geyt	0	0	0	0	0	0	0	0	0	0

=== Top scorers ===
Place	Position	Nation	Number	Name	Second Division	FA Cup	League Cup	Football League Trophy	Total
1	FW	England	10	Tony Naylor	15	1	0	5	21
2	FW	England	15	Marc Bridge-Wilkinson	9	1	1	3	14
3	FW	England	25	Steve Brooker	9	0	0	2	11
4	DF	England	3	Allen Tankard	4	0	0	1	5
5	MF	England	4	Dave Brammer	3	1	0	0	4
–	MF	England	16	Jeff Minton	1	2	1	0	4
7	DF	England	19	Alex Smith	2	0	0	1	3
–	MF	Ireland	8	Micky Cummins	2	0	0	1	3
9	MF	England	11	Tommy Widdrington	2	0	0	0	2
–	FW	England	23	Michael Twiss	2	0	0	0	2
–	FW	Finland	9	Ville Viljanen	2	0	0	0	2
–	FW	Jamaica	7	Onandi Lowe	1	0	0	1	2
13	MF	England	17	Neil Brisco	1	0	0	0	1
–	MF	Ireland	18	George O'Callaghan	1	0	0	0	1
–	DF	England	5	Michael Walsh	1	0	0	0	1
–	DF	Saint Kitts	6	Sagi Burton	0	1	0	0	1
–		–	–	Own goals	0	0	0	1	1
				TOTALS	55	5	3	15	78

== Transfers ==
=== Transfers in ===
Date from	Position	Nationality	Name	From	Fee	Ref.
May 2000	MF	ENG	Marc Bridge-Wilkinson	Derby County	Free transfer	
14 June 2000	GK	IRL	Dean Delany	Everton	Free transfer	
July 2000	MF	ENG	Michael Twiss	Manchester United	Free transfer	
July 2000	FW	SAF	Sinclair Le Geyt	Derby County	Free transfer	
29 January 2001	FW	ENG	Steve Brooker	Watford	£15,000	
April 2001	FW	ENG	Richard Burgess	Bromsgrove Rovers	Free transfer	

=== Transfers out ===
Date from	Position	Nationality	Name	To	Fee	Ref.
May 2001	MF	NGR	Dele Olaoye	(United States) Michigan Bucks	Free transfer	
June 2001	DF	ENG	Allen Tankard	Mansfield Town	Released	
June 2001	MF	ENG	Michael Twiss	Leigh RMI	Free transfer	
July 2001	MF	ENG	Jeff Minton	Rotherham United	Free transfer	
July 2001	MF	ENG	Alex Smith	Reading	Free transfer	
July 2001	FW	FIN	Ville Viljanen	(Sweden) GAIS	Free transfer	
10 August 2001	MF	ENG	Tommy Widdrington	Hartlepool United	Released	
August 2001	MF	ENG	Dave Brammer	Crewe Alexandra	£500,000	
August 2001	MF	ENG	Richard Eyre	Macclesfield Town	Free transfer	
Summer 2001	FW	ENG	Tony Naylor	Cheltenham Town	Released	

=== Loans in ===
Date from	Position	Nationality	Name	From	Date to	Ref.
8 September 2000	FW	IRL	David Freeman	Nottingham Forest	8 October 2000	
6 October 2000	FW	ENG	Wayne Gray	Wimbledon	15 October 2000	
6 October 2000	MF	ENG	David Beresford	Wimbledon	6 November 2000	
1 January 2001	FW	JAM	Onandi Lowe	(United States) Kansas City Wizards	End of season	
5 January 2001	FW	ENG	Steve Brooker	Watford	18 January 2001	
22 March 2001	MF	ENG	Ashley Dodd	Manchester United	End of season	
