= 1997–98 Port Vale F.C. season =

Port Vale F.C.
1997–98 season
- Chairman: Bill Bell
- Manager: John Rudge
- Stadium: Vale Park
- Football League First Division: 19th (49 points)
- FA Cup: Third Round (eliminated by Arsenal)
- League Cup: First Round (eliminated by York City)
- Player of the Year: Gareth Ainsworth
- Top goalscorer: League: Lee Mills (14); All: Lee Mills (16)
- Highest home attendance: 14,964 vs. Arsenal, 14 January 1998
- Lowest home attendance: 2,749 vs. York City, 12 August 1997
- Average home league attendance: 8,263
- Biggest win: 4–0 vs. Huddersfield Town, 3 May 1998
- Biggest defeat: 1–5 vs. Ipswich Town, 18 April 1998
Home colours	Away colours

The 1997–98 season was Port Vale's 86th season of football in the English Football League, and fourth successive season in the First Division. Under the stewardship of manager John Rudge and chairman Bill Bell, the club produced a dramatic final-day escape from relegation, securing a vital 4–0 win over Huddersfield Town that ensured Vale survived while Potteries derby rivals Stoke City were relegated — leaving Port Vale as the proud top club in the Potteries.

In cup competitions, Vale put up a commendable fight in the FA Cup, drawing Arsenal away before falling in a tense Third Round replay on penalties. Their League Cup campaign ended at the First Round stage. The campaign also marked a transition in the squad: key departures included high-performing duo Lee Mills and Jon McCarthy, alongside stalwarts Dean Glover, Andy Porter, and Andy Hill. In a bid to strengthen, Vale broke their transfer record by signing Gareth Ainsworth from Lincoln City for £500,000. On the scoring front, Lee Mills finished as both league (14) and season top scorer (16 goals). Attendance peaked at 14,964 for the FA Cup tie against Arsenal and dropped to a low of 2,749 vs. York City, with an average attendance of 8,263. The club's heaviest league reverse was a 5–1 defeat to Ipswich Town on 18 April 1998.

== Overview ==
=== First Division ===
The pre-season saw the arrival of Swedish midfielder Jan Jansson from IFK Norrköping for a £200,000 fee. Dutch defender Mark Snijders also signed from AZ.

The Vale started the season in modest form, picking up 14 points in the opening nine games. On 23 August, they defeated Sunderland by three goals to one after Tony Naylor secured the three points in the 72nd minute by nutmegging Andy Melville on a run that began just inside the Sunderland half and ended with a swerving right-foot shot into the corner of the net. On 11 September, John Rudge made the club's record signing by paying Lincoln City £500,000 for the services of midfielder Gareth Ainsworth. To pay for this, Jon McCarthy was sold to Birmingham City for £1.5m. Also heading away from Stoke-on-Trent was Arjan van Heusden, who joined Oxford United on loan. The next month, Gareth Griffiths left for a loan spell at Shrewsbury Town. Disappointment came on 12 October, with a 2–1 defeat to rivals Stoke City at the newly opened Britannia Stadium. Vale's indifferent form continued, one highlight being a 3–2 win over Manchester City at Maine Road on 4 November in which Andy Porter man-marked Georgi Kinkladze out of the game. Later in the year, Paul Beesley joined on loan from Man City, and played a handful of games. The club's indifferent form then turned to a terrible run of ten defeats in twelve games, which included a run of one goal scored in seven games. Their form picked up in February, though they were still inconsistent.

On 1 March, Stoke, who were also in relegation danger, escaped from Vale Park with a goalless draw. On 7 March, Vale beat Reading 3–0 at Elm Park after going into a two-goal lead inside 20 minutes. Later in month Rudge signed young Tottenham Hotspur forward Paul Mahorn on non-contract terms. On 14 March, a 2–1 win over Manchester City was to prove crucial – the club's first home win over Manchester City, though Vale were still in danger of the drop. Going into their final game with Huddersfield Town at the Alfred McAlpine Stadium Vale had lost three straight games, and needed a win to ensure their safety in the league. A brace from Jansson, and one each from Martin Foyle and Lee Mills earned Vale a 4–0 win. Rudge said: "It all ended happily in the end but we must take that as a warning and not ignore it".

They finished in 19th place, one point above Manchester City in the relegation zone. Stoke City were also relegated, and had Stoke beat Vale in Burslem, then Vale would have taken Stoke's place in the relegation zone. Lee Mills was the club's top-scorer with 16 goals, whilst Tony Naylor also hit double-figures.

At the end of the season, Lee Mills was signed by Premier League Bradford City, becoming Bradford's first million-pound player. Twelve-year club veteran Andy Porter signed for Wigan Athletic, as did Griffiths. Another major departure was nine-year club veteran defender Dean Glover, who joined non-League Kidderminster Harriers. Another older player, Andy Hill, retired outright. Other departures were Dave Barnett to Lincoln City, Dean Stokes to Third Division Rochdale, and Dutch keeper Arjan van Heusden also headed into the basement division with Cambridge United. Fellow Dutchman Jermaine Holwijn returned to the Netherlands to play for HFC Haarlem.

=== Finances ===
The club's shirt sponsors were Tunstall Assurance.

=== Cup competitions ===
In the FA Cup, Vale faced a trip to Highbury to face Arsenal. Rudge's "Valiants" battled to a goalless draw with the "Gunners" to take the Londoners back to Burslem; manager Arsène Wenger remarked that it was "amazing how teams who do not do especially well in their own league suddenly become monsters". Again goalless, Dennis Bergkamp scored in the tenth minute of extra time, but Wayne Corden equalized eight minutes before the full-time whistle. Lee Dixon missed the first penalty of the shoot-out, but Arsenal recovered to win the game 4–3 on penalties, and later went on to lift the cup. Rudge later told the story of the kit lady informing him the washing machine had broken down before the match and could Rudge contact the suppliers, leaving him to contemplate "I wonder if Arsene Wenger is doing this?" Bell said the club made a total of £300,000 from the two ties.

In the League Cup, Second Division York City eliminated the Vale with a 3–2 aggregate victory.

== Results ==
=== Football League First Division ===
==== League table ====
Pos	Team	Pld	W	D	L	GF	GA	GD	Pts
17	Bury	46	11	19	16	42	58	−16	52
18	Swindon Town	46	14	10	22	42	73	−31	52
19	Port Vale	46	13	10	23	56	66	−10	49
20	Portsmouth	46	13	10	23	51	63	−12	49
21	Queens Park Rangers	46	10	19	17	51	63	−12	49

Source: Statto.com
Rules for classification: 1) Points; 2) Goals scored; 3) Goal difference

==== Results by matchday ====
Round	1	2	3	4	5	6	7	8	9	10	11	12	13	14	15	16	17	18	19	20	21	22	23	24	25	26	27	28	29	30	31	32	33	34	35	36	37	38	39	40	41	42	43	44	45	46
Ground	H	A	H	A	H	A	A	H	H	A	A	H	H	A	H	A	A	H	H	A	H	A	H	A	H	A	H	H	A	A	H	H	A	A	H	H	A	H	A	A	H	A	H	A	H	A
Result	L	L	W	D	W	L	W	D	W	L	L	D	W	L	D	W	W	L	D	L	L	L	L	L	L	L	W	L	L	D	D	L	W	L	D	L	W	W	D	L	W	D	L	L	L	W
Position	20	22	14	17	11	14	9	11	8	8	11	14	8	13	14	10	7	11	9	11	13	14	17	18	18	20	18	19	21	20	21	21	21	21	24	24	23	19	20	20	18	17	19	20	20	19
Points	0	0	3	4	7	7	10	11	14	14	14	15	18	18	19	22	25	25	26	26	26	26	26	26	26	26	29	29	29	30	31	31	34	34	35	35	38	41	42	42	45	46	46	46	46	49

Source: Statto
A = Away; H = Home; W = Win; D = Draw; L = Loss

==== Matches ====
9 August 1997 1	Port Vale	0–1	Nottingham Forest	Burslem
15:00 BST		Report	Campbell 39'	Stadium: Vale Park; Attendance: 12,533; Referee: Phil Richards

16 August 1997 2	Portsmouth	3–1	Port Vale	Portsmouth
	Aloisi 24'; Svensson 38', 47'	Report	Talbot 43'	Stadium: Fratton Park; Attendance: 10,605; Referee: Rob Harris

23 August 1997 3	Port Vale	3–1	Sunderland	Burslem
	Mills 3'; Naylor 39', 72'	Report	Phillips 76'	Stadium: Vale Park; Attendance: 8,290; Referee: Andy D'Urso

3 September 1997 4	Wolverhampton Wanderers	1–1	Port Vale	Wolverhampton
	Bull 74'	Report	Foyle 82'	Stadium: Molineux Stadium; Attendance: 21,524; Referee: Alan Butler

9 September 1997 5	Port Vale	2–1	Stockport County	Burslem
19:45 BST	Mills 1', 36'	Report	Dinning 43' (pen.)	Stadium: Vale Park; Attendance: 6,615; Referee: Graham Laws

13 September 1997 6	Norwich City	1–0	Port Vale	Norwich
	Fleck 59'	Report		Stadium: Carrow Road; Attendance: 11,269

16 September 1997 7	Crewe Alexandra	0–1	Port Vale	Crewe
		Report	Mills 55'	Stadium: Gresty Road; Attendance: 5,519

20 September 1997 8	Port Vale	1–1	Bury	Burslem
	Ainsworth 7'	Report	Swan 82'	Stadium: Vale Park; Attendance: 6,781; Referee: Trevor Jones

27 September 1997 9	Port Vale	2–0	Queens Park Rangers	Burslem
	Snijders 17'; Naylor 20'	Report		Stadium: Vale Park; Attendance: 7,197; Referee: Eddie Wolstenholme

4 October 1997 10	Swindon Town	4–2	Port Vale	Swindon
	Hay 49', 81', 85'; Taylor 67'	Report	Glover 36'; Foyle 86'	Stadium: County Ground; Attendance: 8,048; Referee: Steve Bennett

12 October 1997 11	Stoke City	2–1	Port Vale	Stoke-on-Trent
	Forsyth 5'; Keen 34'	Report	Naylor	Stadium: The Britannia; Attendance: 20,125; Referee: Clive Wilkes

18 October 1997 12	Port Vale	0–0	Bradford City	Burslem
		Report		Stadium: Vale Park; Attendance: 7,148; Referee: Paul Danson

21 October 1997 13	Port Vale	4–1	Huddersfield Town	Burslem
	Horne 26' (og.); Talbot 47'; Ainsworth 73'; Naylor 83'	Report	Stewart 86'	Stadium: Vale Park; Attendance: 5,244; Referee: Mike Bailey

25 October 1997 14	Middlesbrough	2–1	Port Vale	Middlesbrough
	Merson 11', 68' (pen.)	Report	Foyle 90'	Stadium: Riverside Stadium; Attendance: 30,096; Referee: Scott Mathieson

1 November 1997 15	Port Vale	0–0	Reading	Burslem
		Report		Stadium: Vale Park; Attendance: 6,569; Referee: George Cain

4 November 1997 16	Manchester City	2–3	Port Vale	Manchester
	Wiekens 15'; Dickov 41'	Report	Snijders 17'; Talbot 45'; Naylor 50'	Stadium: Maine Road; Attendance: 24,554; Referee: Mike Brandwood

8 November 1997 17	Tranmere Rovers	1–2	Port Vale	Prenton
	Irons 51'	Report	Naylor 14', 67'	Stadium: Prenton Park; Attendance: 7,063; Referee: Kevin Lynch

15 November 1997 18	Port Vale	1–2	West Bromwich Albion	Burslem
	Mills 48'	Report	Hunt 57'; Hamilton 68'	Stadium: Vale Park; Attendance: 11,124; Referee: Roger Furnandiz

22 November 1997 19	Port Vale	0–0	Sheffield United	Burslem
		Report		Stadium: Vale Park; Attendance: 8,017; Referee: David Pugh

29 November 1997 20	Oxford United	2–0	Port Vale	Oxford
	Beauchamp 32'; Jemson 57'	Report		Stadium: Manor Ground; Attendance: 5,762; Referee: Mick Fletcher

6 December 1997 21	Port Vale	0–1	Birmingham City	Burslem
		Report	Cottee 18'	Stadium: Vale Park; Attendance: 7,509; Referee: Eddie Lomas

13 December 1997 22	Charlton Athletic	1–0	Port Vale	Charlton, London
	Newton 84'	Report		Stadium: The Valley; Attendance: 11,077; Referee: Mark Halsey

20 December 1997 23	Port Vale	1–3	Ipswich Town	Burslem
	Foyle 50'	Report	Mathie 10', 22'; Johnson 43'	Stadium: Vale Park; Attendance: 5,784; Referee: Terry Heilbron

26 December 1997 24	Stockport County	3–0	Port Vale	Stockport
15:00 GMT	Travis 66', 80'; Bennett 71'	Report		Stadium: Edgeley Park; Attendance: 10,003; Referee: Guy Stretton

28 December 1997 25	Port Vale	0–2	Wolverhampton Wanderers	Burslem
		Report	Muscat 45'; Freedman 87'	Stadium: Vale Park; Attendance: 10,898; Referee: Paul Taylor

10 January 1998 26	Nottingham Forest	2–1	Port Vale	Nottingham
15:00 GMT	van Hooijdonk 27', 83'	Report	Mills 16'	Stadium: City Ground; Attendance: 17,639; Referee: Andy D'Urso

17 January 1998 27	Port Vale	2–1	Portsmouth	Burslem
	Talbot 29'; Mills 56'	Report	Durnin 36'	Stadium: Vale Park; Attendance: 6,028; Referee: Mike Bailey

24 January 1998 28	Port Vale	2–3	Crewe Alexandra	Burslem
	Naylor 1'; Porter 74' (pen.)	Report	Smith 2' (pen.); Whalley 33'; Foran 41'	Stadium: Vale Park; Attendance: 6,683; Referee: Phil Richards

31 January 1998 29	Sunderland	4–2	Port Vale	Sunderland
	Johnston 12'; Phillips 13'; Quinn 20'; Carragher 87' (og.)	Report	Talbot 39'; Jansson 90'	Stadium: Stadium of Light; Attendance: 39,258; Referee: Mike Pike

7 February 1998 30	Bury	2–2	Port Vale	Bury, Greater Manchester
	Battersby 30'; Ellis 60'	Report	Mills 10'; Bogie 17'	Stadium: Gigg Lane; Attendance: 5,285; Referee: Brian Coddington

14 February 1998 31	Port Vale	2–2	Norwich City	Burslem
	Mills 34', 85'	Report	Grant 64'; Jackson 68'	Stadium: Vale Park; Attendance: 6,664; Referee: Alan Wiley

17 February 1998 32	Port Vale	0–1	Swindon Town	Burslem
		Report	Collins 4'	Stadium: Vale Park; Attendance: 5,925; Referee: Matt Messias

21 February 1998 33	Queens Park Rangers	0–1	Port Vale	Shepherd's Bush, West London
		Report	Mills 24'	Stadium: Loftus Road; Attendance: 14,198; Referee: Alan Butler

24 February 1998 34	Bradford City	2–1	Port Vale	Bradford
	Melville 34'; Pepper 58'	Report	Foyle 29'	Stadium: Valley Parade; Attendance: 13,293; Referee: William Burns

1 March 1998 35	Port Vale	0–0	Stoke City	Burslem
		Report		Stadium: Vale Park; Attendance: 13,853; Referee: Paul Rejer

4 March 1998 36	Port Vale	0–1	Tranmere Rovers	Burslem
		Report	Kelly 47'	Stadium: Vale Park; Attendance: 5,465; Referee: Anthony Leake

7 March 1998 37	Reading	0–3	Port Vale	Reading, Berkshire
		Report	Mills 7'; Talbot 19'; Jansson 82'	Stadium: Elm Park; Attendance: 7,139; Referee: Mark Halsey

14 March 1998 38	Port Vale	2–1	Manchester City	Burslem
	Foyle 13'; Ainsworth 73'	Report	Wiekens 61'	Stadium: Vale Park; Attendance: 13,122; Referee: Roger Furnandiz

21 March 1998 39	West Bromwich Albion	2–2	Port Vale	West Bromwich
	Flynn 24'; Taylor 83'	Report	Jansson 69'; Foyle 90'	Stadium: The Hawthorns; Attendance: 14,242; Referee: Terry Heilbron

28 March 1998 40	Sheffield United	2–1	Port Vale	Sheffield
	Marcelo 83'; Saunders 89'	Report	Corden 90'	Stadium: Bramall Lane; Attendance: 15,860; Referee: Steve Bennett

4 April 1998 41	Port Vale	3–0	Oxford United	Burslem
	Mills 29'; Naylor 42'; Ainsworth 84'	Report		Stadium: Vale Park; Attendance: 6,524; Referee: Kevin Lynch

11 April 1998 42	Birmingham City	1–1	Port Vale	Birmingham
	Ndlovu 87'	Report	Ainsworth 58'	Stadium: St Andrew's; Attendance: 17,193; Referee: George Cain

13 April 1998 43	Port Vale	0–1	Charlton Athletic	Burslem
		Report	Mendonca 73' (pen.)	Stadium: Vale Park; Attendance: 9,973; Referee: Eddie Wolstenholme

18 April 1998 44	Ipswich Town	5–1	Port Vale	Ipswich
	Johnson 4', 58'; Petta 27', 29'; Mathie 56'	Report	Barnett 65'	Stadium: Portman Road; Attendance: 16,205; Referee: Paul Taylor

24 April 1998 45	Port Vale	0–1	Middlesbrough	Burslem
		Report	Merson 2'	Stadium: Vale Park; Attendance: 12,096; Referee: Clive Wilkes

3 May 1998 46	Huddersfield Town	0–4	Port Vale	Huddersfield
		Report	Foyle 2'; Jansson 25', 60'; Mills 79'	Stadium: Kirklees Stadium; Attendance: 15,610; Referee: Guy Stretton

=== FA Cup ===
3 January 1998 R3	Arsenal	0–0	Port Vale	Highbury, North London
		Report		Stadium: Arsenal Stadium; Attendance: 37,471; Referee: Paul Alcock

14 January 1998 Replay	Port Vale	1–1 (a.e.t.) (3–4 p)	Arsenal	Burslem
	Corden 112'	Report	Bergkamp 100'	Stadium: Vale Park; Attendance: 14,964; Referee: Neale Barry

=== League Cup ===
12 August 1997 R1 1st Leg	Port Vale	1–1	York City	Burslem
	Mills 24'	Report	Bull 32'; Bushell 90'	Stadium: Vale Park; Attendance: 2,749; Referee: Anthony Leake

26 August 1997 R1 2nd Leg	York City	2–1 (3–2 agg.)	Port Vale	York
	Barras 37'	Report	Mills 89'	Stadium: Bootham Crescent; Attendance: 3,195; Referee: Brian Coddington

== Squad statistics ==
=== Appearances and goals ===
Key to positions: GK – Goalkeeper; DF – Defender; MF – Midfielder; FW – Forward

No.	Pos	Nat	Player	Total		First Division		FA Cup		League Cup	
No.	Pos	Nat	Player	Apps	Goals	Apps	Goals	Apps	Goals	Apps	Goals
	GK	(England) ENG	Matthew Boswell	0	0	0	0	0	0	0	0
	GK	(England) ENG	Paul Musselwhite	45	0	41	0	2	0	2	0
	GK	(Netherlands) NED	Arjan van Heusden	5	0	5	0	0	0	0	0
	DF	(England) ENG	Neil Aspin	30	0	26	0	2	0	2	0
	DF	(England) ENG	Dave Barnett	9	1	9	1	0	0	0	0
	DF	(Northern Ireland) NIR	Liam Burns	1	0	1	0	0	0	0	0
	DF	(England) ENG	Matt Carragher	26	0	26	0	0	0	0	0
	DF	(England) ENG	Dean Glover	27	1	25	1	1	0	1	0
	DF	(England) ENG	Gareth Griffiths	3	0	3	0	0	0	0	0
	DF	(England) ENG	Andy Hill	31	0	27	0	2	0	2	0
	DF	(Netherlands) NED	Mark Snijders	24	4	24	2	0	2	0	0
	DF	(England) ENG	Dean Stokes	9	0	8	0	0	0	1	0
	DF	(England) ENG	Allen Tankard	43	0	39	0	2	0	2	0
	MF	(England) ENG	Gareth Ainsworth	42	5	40	5	2	0	0	0
	MF	(England) ENG	Ian Bogie	41	1	38	1	2	0	1	0
	MF	(England) ENG	Wayne Corden	37	2	33	1	2	1	2	0
	MF	(England) ENG	Richard Eyre	1	0	1	0	0	0	0	0
	MF	(Sweden) SWE	Jan Jansson	35	5	33	5	0	0	2	0
	MF	(Netherlands) NED	Rogier Koordes	10	0	10	0	0	0	0	0
	MF	(England) ENG	Andy Porter	44	1	41	1	2	0	1	0
	MF	(Wales) WAL	Scott Ruscoe	0	0	0	0	0	0	0	0
	MF	(England) ENG	Stewart Talbot	46	6	42	6	2	0	2	0
	FW	(England) ENG	Simon Armstrong	0	0	0	0	0	0	0	0
	FW	(England) ENG	Dean Cunningham	0	0	0	0	0	0	0	0
	FW	(England) ENG	Martin Foyle	43	8	39	8	2	0	2	0
	FW	(England) ENG	Lee Mills	45	16	42	14	1	0	2	2
	FW	(England) ENG	Tony Naylor	42	10	38	10	2	0	2	0
	FW	(England) ENG	Steve Williams	0	0	0	0	0	0	0	0
Players who featured but departed the club during the season:
	DF	(England) ENG	Paul Beesley	5	0	5	0	0	0	0	0
	DF	(Northern Ireland) NIR	Jon McCarthy	6	0	4	0	0	0	2	0
	FW	(England) ENG	Justin O'Reilly	0	0	0	0	0	0	0	0

=== Top scorers ===
Place	Position	Nation	Name	First Division	FA Cup	League Cup	Total
1	FW	England	Lee Mills	14	0	2	16
2	FW	England	Tony Naylor	10	0	0	10
3	FW	England	Martin Foyle	8	0	0	8
4	MF	England	Stewart Talbot	6	0	0	6
5	MF	Sweden	Jan Jansson	5	0	0	5
–	MF	England	Gareth Ainsworth	5	0	0	5
7	MF	England	Wayne Corden	1	1	0	2
–	DF	Netherlands	Mark Snijders	2	0	0	2
9	DF	England	Dean Glover	1	0	0	1
–	DF	England	Dave Barnett	1	0	0	1
–	MF	England	Ian Bogie	1	0	0	1
–	MF	England	Andy Porter	1	0	0	1
–		–	Own goals	1	0	0	1
			TOTALS	56	1	2	59

== Transfers ==
=== Transfers in ===
Date from	Position	Nationality	Name	From	Fee	Ref.
1997	DF	ENG	Matt Carragher	Wigan Athletic	Free transfer	
Summer 1997	MF	SWE	Jan Jansson	(Sweden) IFK Norrköping	£200,000	
Summer 1997	DF	NED	Mark Snijders	(Netherlands) AZ Alkmaar	Free transfer	
12 September 1997	MF	ENG	Gareth Ainsworth	Lincoln City	£500,000	

=== Transfers out ===
Date from	Position	Nationality	Name	To	Fee	Ref.
11 September 1997	MF	NIR	Jon McCarthy	Birmingham City	£1.5 million	
1998	DF	NED	Jermaine Holwijn	(Netherlands) HFC Haarlem	Free transfer	
26 March 1998	FW	ENG	Justin O'Reilly	Southport	Free transfer	
July 1998	MF	ENG	Andy Porter	Wigan Athletic	Free transfer	
June 1998	DF	ENG	Gareth Griffiths	Wigan Athletic	Free transfer	
Summer 1998	DF	ENG	Dean Glover	Kidderminster Harriers	Free transfer	
Summer 1998	DF	ENG	Andy Hill	Retired		
7 August 1998	FW	ENG	Lee Mills	Bradford City	£1,000,000	
Summer 1998	DF	ENG	Dean Stokes	Rochdale	Free transfer	
August 1998	GK	NED	Arjan van Heusden	Cambridge United	Free transfer	

=== Loans in ===
Date from	Position	Nationality	Name	From	Date to	Ref.
24 December 1997	DF	ENG	Paul Beesley	Manchester City	December 1997	
March 1998	DF	ENG	Dave Barnett	(Scotland) Dunfermline Athletic	End of season	

=== Loans out ===
Date from	Position	Nationality	Name	To	Date to	Ref.
8 August 1997	GK	ENG	Matthew Boswell	Witton Albion	199?	
26 September 1997	GK	NED	Arjan van Heusden	Oxford United	October 1997	
31 October 1997	DF	ENG	Gareth Griffiths	Shrewsbury Town	November 1997	
23 December 1997	FW	ENG	Simon Armstrong	Boston United	End of season	
30 January 1998	FW	ENG	Steve Williams	Witton Albion	1998	
25 March 1998	GK	ENG	Matthew Boswell	Barnet	End of season	
