= Dele Olaoye =

Nigerian footballer

Personal information
- Full name: Dolapo Olaoye
- Date of birth: 17 October 1982 (age 44)
- Place of birth: Lagos, Nigeria
- Height: 5 ft 10 in (1.78 m)
- Position: Striker

Senior career*
| Years | Team | Apps | (Gls) |
| 2000–2001 | Port Vale | 1 | (0) |
| 2002–2005 | Michigan Bucks | | |
| 2006–2008 | Stafford Rangers | 24 | (4) |
| 2008–20?? | Redditch United | | |
| 2008 | → Rugby Town (loan) | 4 | (1) |
- * Club domestic league appearances and goals

Dolapo Olaoye (born 17 October 1982) is a Nigerian former footballer. He played in the Football League for Port Vale, and also played Conference football for Stafford Rangers.

== Career ==
Olaoye joined Port Vale in August 2000, making his debut on 19 August as a late substitute for Tony Naylor in Vale's 3–0 win at home to Oxford United. However, this was his only appearance in the Vale first-team before being released.

He subsequently moved to the United States where he attended Mercer University and played for Michigan Bucks. He scored 31 goals in four years with the Bucks, being named as Freshman of the Year in 2002, on the First Team All-Conference in 2002 and 2004, on the Second Team All-Conference in 2003 and 2005, and the All-Tournament Team in 2005. He returned to Port Vale as a triallist in July 2005, scoring in their 4–1 friendly win against Northwich Victoria.

He joined Stafford Rangers in August 2006, but struggled with injuries and was released at the end of the 2007–08 season after Stafford's relegation to the Conference North. He joined Redditch United, but was loaned to Rugby Town before the start of the 2008–09 season, returning to Redditch in August 2008.

== Career statistics ==
Appearances and goals by club, season and competition
| Club | Season | League | | | FA Cup | | Other | | Total | |
| Club | Season | Division | Apps | Goals | Apps | Goals | Apps | Goals | Apps | Goals |
|---|---|---|---|---|---|---|---|---|---|---|
| Port Vale | 2000–01 | Second Division | 1 | 0 | 0 | 0 | 0 | 0 | 1 | 0 |
| Stafford Rangers | 2006–07 | Conference National | 16 | 4 | 2 | 0 | 0 | 0 | 18 | 4 |
| Stafford Rangers | 2007–08 | Conference National | 8 | 0 | 0 | 0 | 0 | 0 | 8 | 0 |
| Stafford Rangers | Total | | 24 | 4 | 2 | 0 | 0 | 0 | 26 | 4 |
