= 2001 Football League Trophy final =

2001 LDV Vans Trophy final
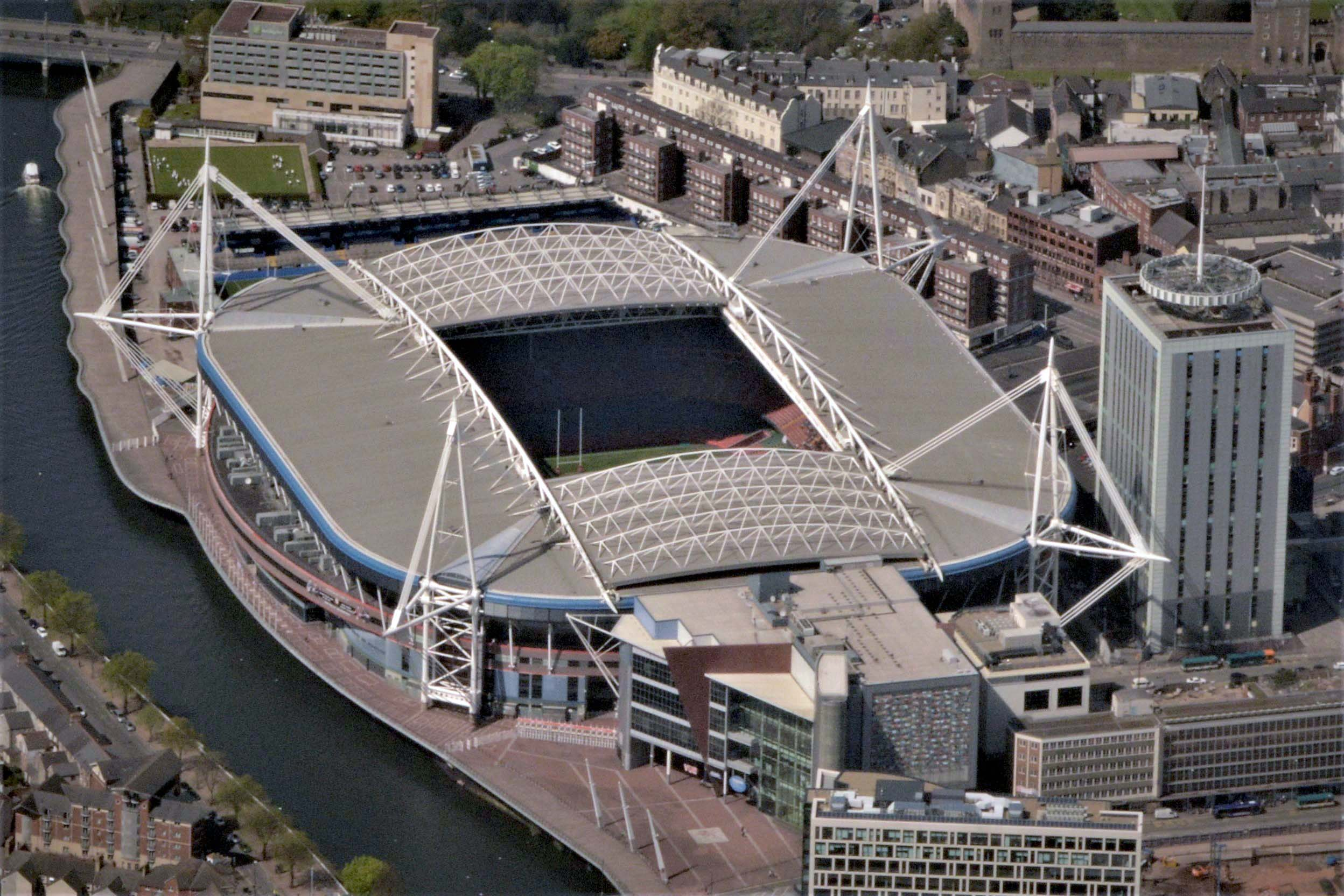
- Aerial view of the Millennium Stadium in 2016
- Event: 2000–01 Football League Trophy
Port Vale	Brentford
2	1
- Date: 22 April 2001
- Venue: Millennium Stadium, Cardiff
- Man of the Match: Dave Brammer
- Referee: William Burns
- Attendance: 25,654
- Weather: Rain

The 2001 Football League Trophy final was a football match between Port Vale and Brentford on 22 April 2001 at the Millennium Stadium, Cardiff. It was the final match of the 2000–01 Football League Trophy, which was in its 18th season, a cup competition for teams from the Second Division and Third Division of the Football League (the third and fourth tiers of the English football league system). The match was played at the Millennium Stadium, due to the ongoing reconstruction of its usual venue, Wembley Stadium. Each club had one previous appearance in the final of the Football League Trophy, Port Vale winning the competition in 1993 and Brentford beaten finalists in 1985.

Both clubs had to survive five knock-out rounds to reach the final, Port Vale making it through the northern section and Brentford the only team remaining from the southern section. Port Vale easily advanced past Notts County, Chester City and Darlington, before overcoming Potteries derby rivals Stoke City 2–1 with a golden goal at the Britannia Stadium in the area semi-finals, and then beating Lincoln City 2–0 on aggregate in the two legged area finals. Meanwhile, Brentford easily beat Oxford United, before relying on penalties to overcome Brighton & Hove Albion and then beating Barnet, Swansea City and finally Southend United (4–2 on aggregate). The two teams had finished within three places on each other in the Second Division and had drawn both their league matches 1–1.

Brentford took the lead through Michael Dobson on three minutes and it took until 76 minutes for Vale to equalise, when Marc Bridge-Wilkinson converted a penalty which was awarded following a foul from Darren Powell on Tony Naylor. Steve Brooker then put the Vale into the lead seven minutes later and they went on to win the match 2–1. Dave Brammer was named as man of the match.

== Route to the final ==
The Football League Trophy is a football competition for clubs in the third and fourth tier of the English Football League. Due to the creation of the Premier League in 1992, the third and fourth tiers of the English football league system were called the Second Division and Third Division. The final was scheduled a week before the play-off finals and only three days after the play-off semi-finals. The tournament was split into two sections: North and South, with Port Vale coming through the northern section and Brentford through the southern section. All five rounds were knock-out games and the area finals were two legged games, home and away, with the winners of each section going into the overall final.

=== Port Vale ===
Round	Opposition	Score
1st	Notts County	3–0 (h)
2nd	Chester City	2–0 (h)
QF	Darlington	4–0 (h)
SF	Stoke City	2–1 (a)
finals	Lincoln City	2–0 (a); 0–0 (h)
Key: QF = quarter-finals; SF = semi-finals (h) = Home venue; (a) = Away venue.

The first round saw Port Vale breeze past a second-string Notts County team 3–0 at Vale Park, ending a 300-minute goal drought in the process. Alex Smith gave Vale an eighth-minute lead with a drilled effort from long-range, Tony Naylor then provided an assist for Steve Brooker to double the advantage before putting the game beyond County on 59 minutes; Smith later won a penalty, which was missed by Tommy Widdrington. Vale then had a home tie with Conference club Chester City – who had suffered relegation from the Football League the previous season – and made the two division gap show with a confident performance; Chester defender Matt Doughty put a Smith cross into his own net on the 21st-minute and only some excellent goalkeeping from Wayne Brown kept the score down, he conceded just one further goal after Naylor struck the net from a Dave Brammer cross. Third Division strugglers Darlington failed to provide much stiffer competition in the area quarter-finals, as Onandi Lowe netted on his debut, followed by a headed goal from Allen Tankard and a brace from Naylor, giving the Vale a 4–0 victory.

Port Vale found their challenge in the area semi-finals, facing their rivals and Football League trophy holders Stoke City; despite it being a home tie the fixture was actually played at the Britannia Stadium due to the poor state of the Vale Park pitch. It took extra-time to separate the teams, Micky Cummins put the Vale ahead on 64 minutes before Nicky Mohan scored a late equaliser. However, Mohan gave away a penalty in the 105th-minute and Marc Bridge-Wilkinson converted, ending the game with a golden goal, to give the Burslem club a night of celebration.

The area finals were two-legged fixtures, Port Vale against Lincoln City, with the first leg at Sincil Bank. Lincoln were the better side in the first half, but Vale came into the game and it was Bridge-Wilkinson who broke the deadlock after scoring direct from a free kick in the 53rd-minute; Naylor added a second with five minutes to go to give the "Valiants" a big advantage for the return fixture. Vale then put in a "professional display" in the second leg seven days later, hitting the woodwork three times with Brammer, Smith and Naylor and forcing saves out of Alan Marriott from Brooker and Bridge-Wilkinson; the game finished goalless though and Vale won the tie 2–0 on aggregate.

=== Brentford ===
Round	Opposition	Score
1st	Oxford United	4–1 (h)
2nd	Brighton & Hove Albion	2–2* (h)
QF	Barnet	2–1 (a)
SF	Swansea City	3–2 (a)
finals	Southend United	2–1 (a); 2–1 (h)
Key: QF = quarter-finals; SF = semi-finals (h) = Home venue; (a) = Away venue; * = Penalty shootout victory.

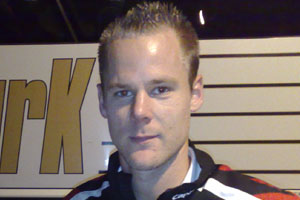
Back-up goalkeeper Paul Smith featured late in the area finals.

Brentford eased to victory over Second Division strugglers Oxford United in the first round at Griffin Park, with Jay Lovett scoring his first Football League goal with a header from Michael Dobson's ninth minute cross; Scott Partridge bagged a brace and despite Steve Anthrobus pulling one back for Oxford, Scott Marshall wrapped up the scoring with Brentford's fourth goal of a 4–1 victory. Eventual Third Division champions Brighton & Hove Albion would prove to be a much sterner test in the second round, although the venue was changed from the Withdean Stadium to Griffin Park. Brighton's Bobby Zamora provided an assist for Paul Brooker's opener before doubling the home side's advantage himself; Brentford came back though, Marshall halving the deficit on the 35th-minute, before their cause was aided by a red card for former Brentford defender Danny Cullip early in the second half. "Bees" striker Mark McCammon equalised with 12 minutes to go and no golden goal was scored in extra-time, leaving the game to be decided with a penalty shootout; it was a night where errors from ex-Brentford players cost Brighton, with Darren Freeman and Paul Watson both missing their penalties to allow Brentford to win the shootout 3–2.

Brentford's area quarter-finals opponents were Barnet on a freezing cold night at the Underhill Stadium. Barnet went down to ten men shortly after the half hour mark after a poor challenge from Greg Heald on Partridge. Brentford took control of the game and Martin Rowlands put them ahead in injury time of the first half; Paul Evans doubled their advantage on 75 minutes, and though Mark Gower grabbed Barnet a consolation and Rowlands was sent off for dissent in injury-time, the visitors went on finish the match 2–1 ahead. They had to then overcome Swansea City at Vetch Field and again found themselves a man up after Swansea goalkeeper Roger Freestone was shown a straight red for bringing down Lloyd Owusu in the penalty area, with Evans converting from the spot to put the "Bees" in a commanding position. Damien Lacey levelled the scores on 56 minutes, though McCammon restored Brentford's lead just two minutes later. The "Swans" again equalised after an impressive strike from Jason Price, though Owusu's late header gave Brentford a 3–2 win without resorting to extra-time.

Their opponents in the two-legged area finals were Southend United, managed by former Brentford boss David Webb, with the first leg played at Roots Hall. David Theobald cleared off the line to deny David Lee a goal in the first half. Dobson then fired Brentford ahead on the 56th-minute, only for a header from Spencer Whelan to bring the game level just a minute later. Dobson struck the net with a shot deflected off the post on 64 minutes and the game ended with Brentford ahead two goals to one. The return fixture took place at Griffin Park a week later. Ívar Ingimarsson gave Brentford an early lead on 13 minutes, but Searle equalised when his free kick went in off Theobald. Brentford goalkeeper Ólafur Gottskálksson left the game injured early in the second half, though young goalkeeper Paul Smith performed excellently in Gottskálksson's absence, denying Scott Forbes and blocking another strike with his legs. Owusu secured the win with a goal on the 78th-minute, assisted by Paul Gibbs. Darren Powell was sent off after receiving two yellow cards late on, but Brentford managed to hold on to their 2–1 lead on the night to win the tie 4–2 on aggregate.

== Pre-match ==
Both clubs each had one previous appearance in a Football League trophy final. Port Vale had defeated Stockport County 2–1 in 1993 and Brentford had lost 3–1 to Wigan Athletic in 1985. The year previous to Vale's original first title, rivals Stoke City had taken home the trophy. Stoke were the winners of the 2000 final Port Vale, based in Burslem, Stoke-on-Trent and London based Brentford had previously been restricted to league encounters and the final was the first cup fixture between the two clubs. Earlier in the 2000–01 season both games had finished as 1–1 draws; Widdrington and Owusu scoring at Vale Park, Paul Evans and Bridge-Wilkinson the scorers at Griffin Park. Both clubs finished the season in mid-table; Vale in 11th and Brentford in 14th, just three points separating them after 46 games. Port vale stayed at the Vale of Glamorgan Hotel before the game.

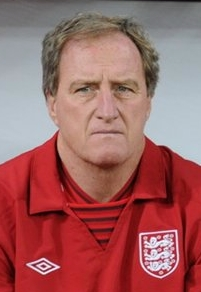
Ray Lewington's side were leading at half-time.

== Match summary ==
=== First-half ===
Brentford got off to a flying start; young Dobson out-jumping Neil Brisco to head home a corner beyond the helpless Mark Goodlad for a 3rd-minute lead. The tone of the game was set by Vale's dominant five-man midfield, with Brammer the engine that drove the "Valiants" search for an equaliser as Brentford struggled to keep pace. It was Brammer who made the Vale's intentions clear; sending a long-range strike goal ward, only for it to be deflected wide. Whereas Sagi Burton made the Brentford defence nervous from set pieces, misers Naylor, Brooker and Bridge-Wilkinson presented the danger from open play. On the 20 minute mark, Naylor pulled back a ball which Bridge-Wilkinson hooked wide. This was to prove their most dangerous movement of the half.

=== Second-half ===
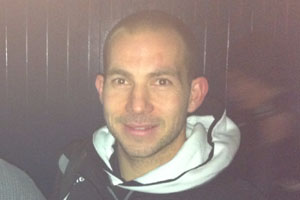
Bridge-Wilkinson scored the equalising goal from the penalty spot.

Not long after the restart Naylor's persistence in front of goal seemed to have paid off, yet he was deemed to be offside – whether the linesman made the right call was a topic of debate. However, Brentford could not rely on help from the officials for long and on the 76th-minute, when Powell brought down Naylor on the edge of the area, the referee signalled for a penalty. Bridge-Wilkinson converted, sending Gottskalksson the wrong way. Seven minutes later and the Vale had the lead; Naylor won the ball from Gavin Mahon deep in the Brentford half, then squared the ball to Brooker, who struck his shot sweetly, leaving Vale 2–1 up on 83 minutes. Brentford piled on the pressure and had numerous late chances; the first falling to substitute McCammon, whose first touch of the game was a poor header that could have found the net if it was well placed. The last kick of the game could have taken it to extra time, however, Owusu headed wide from Gottskálksson's overhead kick – the Brentford goalkeeper doing more than making up the numbers in the Vale box during the last seconds of injury time.

=== Post-match ===
Port Vale manager Brian Horton said that: "The supporters have had a hard season, but have had a great day – as have all the players and staff. Keeping Vale up in my first season as manager here was enjoyable, but as a one off this would have to be the best moment." Brentford manager Ray Lewington added "fair credit to Port Vale who deserved it – we were disappointing and we didn't play well".

With nothing to play for in the league, Horton offered to play the youth team in the club's next league fixture four days later so the cup winning squad could rest, but the players refused as they wanted to play. The game was one rare glimpse of glory for Port Vale, instead of signalling a return to the happy days they enjoyed under John Rudge it was a rare high point before relegation to League Two at the end of the 2007–08 season. Brentford finished bottom of League One at the end of the 2006–07 campaign, before being crowned 2008–09 League Two champions. They reached the final of the Football League Trophy again in 2011, only to lose to Carlisle United.

The trophy was Brian Horton's only honour at Port Vale, his five-year reign ended with his resignation in February 2004 after disagreements with the board over both his contract and the playing budget. After an unsuccessful two years as manager of Macclesfield Town he joined the staff at Hull City, who soon found themselves playing top-flight football. The match was Ray Lewington last in charge at Brentford, he left for Watford, becoming their manager the next year. After being sacked from Watford in March 2005 he joined the staff at Fulham, and went on to join the England coaching staff. The young Marc Bridge-Wilkinson continued to impress at Vale Park and since leaving in June 2004 continued to be a player in demand, following the final he spent the next seven seasons in League One. Steve Brooker departed in September 2004 and became a top performer in League One at Bristol City. Brentford's Michael Dobson stayed at Griffin Park until June 2006, then spent two years at Walsall before leaving the game at the age of 27 to set up his own business. Man of the Match Dave Brammer was voted Port Vale Player of the Year for 2001, and retired in May 2009 at the end of a second spell at the club.

== Match details ==
22 April 2001
15:00 BST

Port Vale	2–1	Brentford
Bridge-Wilkinson 76' (pen.); Brooker 83'	(Report)	Dobson 3'

Millennium Stadium, Cardiff
Attendance: 25,654
Referee: William Burns

Port Vale	Brentford

GK	1	Mark Goodlad
DF	2	Matt Carragher (c)
DF	6	Sagi Burton
DF	5	Michael Walsh
MF	19	Alex Smith
MF	8	Micky Cummins
MF	15	Marc Bridge-Wilkinson
MF	17	Neil Brisco
MF	4	Dave Brammer	Yellow card
FW	25	Steve Brooker
FW	10	Tony Naylor
Substitutes:
GK	12	Dean Delany
DF	3	Allen Tankard
DF	11	Tommy Widdrington
MF	23	Michael Twiss
FW	9	Ville Viljanen
Manager:
Brian Horton

GK	17	Ólafur Gottskálksson
DF	5	Darren Powell	Yellow card
DF	23	David Theobald	Yellow card
DF	19	Paul Gibbs	(substituted off) 88'
DF	25	Michael Dobson
DF	15	Ívar Ingimarsson
MF	8	Gavin Mahon
MF	12	Martin Rowlands	(substituted off) 89'
MF	7	Paul Evans (c)
FW	9	Lloyd Owusu
FW	10	Scott Partridge
Substitute:
GK	31	Paul Smith
DF	32	Jay Lovett
MF	14	Tony Folan
MF	26	Mark Williams	(substituted on) 88'
FW	29	Mark McCammon	(substituted on) 89'
Manager:
Ray Lewington

MATCH RULES

- 90 minutes.
- 30 minutes of extra-time if necessary.
- Penalty shoot-out if scores still level.
- Maximum of 3 substitutions.
