= David Freeman (footballer) =

Irish footballer (born 1979)

Personal information
- Full name: David Barry Freeman
- Date of birth: 25 November 1979 (age 46)
- Place of birth: Dublin, Republic of Ireland
- Height: 5 ft 11 in (1.80 m)
- Positions: Midfielder; forward

Youth career
- Lourdes Celtic
- Cherry Orchard

Senior career*
Years	Team	Apps	(Gls)
1996–2002	Nottingham Forest	8	(0)
2000	→ Port Vale (loan)	3	(0)
2002	Carlisle United	4	(0)
2003	Ilkeston Town		
2003	St Patrick's Athletic		
2004–2005	Drogheda United		
2005–2006	Dublin City		
2006–2007	Longford Town		
2008	Shelbourne		
2009	Monaghan United		
2010	Longford Town	21	(2)
2011	Drogheda United	22	(2)

International career
1996	Republic of Ireland U16	3	(0)
1995	Republic of Ireland U17	2	(0)
1998	Republic of Ireland U18	2	(0)
2000	Republic of Ireland U21	1	(0)
- * Club domestic league appearances and goals

David Barry Freeman (born 25 November 1979) is an Irish former footballer who played as a striker or in central-midfield; he now works as a coach at Burton Albion.

He began his career in England with Nottingham Forest in 1998 and had a loan spell at Port Vale in 2000. He had a brief spell with Carlisle United and Ilkeston Town in 2002 and 2003 before he returned to Ireland to play for St Patrick's Athletic. He helped the club to the League of Ireland Cup before he signed with Drogheda United in 2004. The next year, he moved on to Dublin City before he joined Longford Town in 2006. He switched to Shelbourne in 2008 before he arrived at Monaghan United in 2009. He returned to Longford Town in 2010 before he finished his career with Drogheda United in 2011.

== Playing career ==
Freeman began his career in England with Nottingham Forest, joining the club in 1996. Freeman went on to sign professional terms with the former European champions but only made limited appearances during his tenure at the City Ground. He also had a loan spell with Port Vale in 2000 during his time at Forest. Despite early promise, Freeman was released by Forest in 2002, a knee injury had restricted the already limited opportunities he had to impress the Forest management. Freeman went on to have short spells with Carlisle United and Ilkeston Town before returning to Ireland by signing for St Patrick's Athletic in 2003.

Freeman spent one season with the "Saints", but his sole season will largely remembered for scoring the winning goal for Pats in the 2003 League of Ireland Cup final against Longford Town. Freeman also made an appearance for the Saints in that seasons FAI Cup final, a match Pats lost to Longford Town. Freeman joined Drogheda United for the 2004 season on a professional contract and became a regular figure for the Drogs". The 2005 season though saw Freeman struggle to retain his regular place in the "Drogs" first-team and as a result, Freeman joined First Division promotion contenders Dublin City in July 2005, initially on loan. Freeman went on to sign permanently for the "Vikings" and was instrumental in their successful promotion that season. Freeman began the 2006 season back in the Premier Division with Dublin City, but City folded in July 2006 due to financial difficulties. As a result, Freeman became a free agent and would soon sign for Longford Town. Freeman became a regular figure in the Longford team but struggled to find the back of the net only scoring two goals for the Flancare Park club. The diagnosis of a heart condition prematurely halted Freeman's 2007 campaign. He did not play again that season, and he departed Longford at the end of that season. Freeman signed for Shelbourne in December 2007 on condition of receiving the all-clear from his medics.

Freeman made his Shelbourne debut in a scoreless draw against Dundalk at Tolka Park on 7 March 2008. He scored his first Shelbourne goal a week later during a 3–1 victory over Kildare County at Station Road on 14 March 2008. He finished as a First Division runner-up with "Shels" in the 2008 season. He made 31 league and cup appearances, scoring eight goals. Freeman departed Shels at the end of the season to join Monaghan United on 27 January 2009. Freeman re-joined Longford Town in January 2010 but was released at the end of the 2010 season. He returned to another former club, Drogheda United, for their 2011 Premier Division campaign.

== Coaching career ==
Freeman worked as a coach at the academy at Burton Albion before he was taken on as a full-time academy staff member in July 2017.

== Career statistics ==
Appearances and goals by club, season and competition
Club	Season	League			FA Cup		Other		Total	
Club	Season	Division	Apps	Goals	Apps	Goals	Apps	Goals	Apps	Goals
Nottingham Forest	1999–2000	First Division	3	0	0	0	0	0	3	0
Nottingham Forest	2000–01	First Division	5	0	1	0	0	0	6	0
Nottingham Forest	Total		8	0	1	0	0	0	9	0
Port Vale (loan)	20000–01	Second Division	3	0	0	0	0	0	3	0
Carlisle United	2002–03	Third Division	4	0	0	0	0	0	4	0
Longford Town	2010	LOI First Division	21	2	0	0	0	0	21	22
Drogheda United	2011	LOI Premier Division	22	2	0	0	1	0	23	2

== Honours ==
St. Patrick's Athletic

- League of Ireland Cup: 2003
- FAI Cup runner-up: 2003

Dublin City

- League of Ireland First Division second-place promotion: 2005

Shelbourne

- League of Ireland First Division second-place promotion: 2008
