= Liam Burns =

Northern Irish footballer (born 1978)

Personal information
- Full name: Liam Burns
- Date of birth: 30 October 1978 (age 48)
- Place of birth: Belfast, Northern Ireland
- Height: 6 ft 0 in (1.83 m)
- Position: Centre back

Youth career
- Port Vale

Senior career*
Years	Team	Apps	(Gls)
1997–2004	Port Vale	119	(0)
2004	Bristol Rovers	3	(0)
2004	Shrewsbury Town	2	(0)
2004–2005	Kidderminster Harriers	1	(0)
2005	Forest Green Rovers	3	(0)
2005–2006	Sligo Rovers	60	(1)
2007–2008	Bohemians	55	(2)
2009–2010	Dundalk	56	(3)
2011	Bohemians	32	(1)
2012	Dundalk	23	(0)
Total		355	(7)

International career
1998–1999	Northern Ireland U21	13	(0)

Managerial career
- 2024: Dundalk (interim)
- 2024: Dundalk (interim)
- * Club domestic league appearances and goals

Liam Burns (born 30 October 1978) is a professional football manager and former player who played as a centre-back. He was also the interim manager of League of Ireland Premier Division club Dundalk.

He started his career in England with Port Vale, playing over 100 games in the English Football League for the club between 1997 and 2004. He then spent brief spells with Bristol Rovers, Shrewsbury Town, Kidderminster Harriers, and Forest Green Rovers, before moving to Ireland in 2005 to sign with Sligo Rovers. He helped Sligo to the League of Ireland First Division title in 2005 before moving on to Bohemians the following year. The club finished as League of Ireland Cup runners-up in 2007, and then League of Ireland and FAI Cup champions in 2008. He switched to Dundalk in 2009. He returned to Bohemians in 2011 before joining Dundalk for a second time in January 2012, retiring at the end of that season, he remained at Dundalk as part of the coaching staff after his retirement. He was appointed as Dundalk's interim manager twice in 2024, after the sacking of Stephen O'Donnell in April & after Noel King stepped down in May.

== Career ==
=== Port Vale ===
Burns was born in Belfast but began his career in England as a trainee with Port Vale. He made his First Division debut in 1997–98 under manager John Rudge, coming on for Gareth Griffiths at half-time in a 4–2 defeat to Sunderland at Roker Park. He played four games in 1998–99, making his first start on 6 February in a 2–0 win over Huddersfield Town. He became a regular under new manager Brian Horton in 1999–2000, making 25 appearances in league and cup, as the "Valiants" suffered relegation into the Second Division. He was transfer listed following the club's humiliating FA Cup defeat to Canvey Island, leaving him restricted to 15 appearances in 2000–01; one of these appearances was as a goalkeeper, as on 24 March Mark Goodlad was stretchered off after suffering head injuries on 28 minutes – Burns then went in goal and managed to keep a clean sheet in a goalless draw with Wigan Athletic.

He returned to regular first-team action in 2001–02, playing 39 games in league and cup, and signing a new contract in February 2002. However, the arrivals of Sam Collins and Ian Brightwell pushed Burns down the pecking order. He was limited to 19 appearances in 2002–03. He scored his only goal at Vale Park on 8 November 2003, in a 2–2 draw with Ford United in the FA Cup. He played 30 games in 2003–04, but was released by manager Martin Foyle in May 2004. In seven years with the club he played 119 league and 14 cup games.

=== Departing England ===
Burns joined League Two side Bristol Rovers for their pre-season tour of the Isle of Man. He then stayed at the Memorial Stadium on a short-term deal after impressing manager Ian Atkins, however, after five games he joined league rivals Shrewsbury Town on non-contract terms on 10 December 2004, choosing to join Gary Peters' side rather than staying longer with Bristol Rovers. He stayed just two weeks at Gay Meadow, before he joined Kidderminster Harriers, also of League Two, on non-contract terms. He appeared just once at Aggborough, before he was released by manager Stuart Watkiss on 5 January 2005. Two days later he joined Conference National club Forest Green Rovers on non-contract terms. He played three times for the club, before leaving The Lawn Ground for Ireland.

=== Republic of Ireland ===
He played for Sligo Rovers, helping them to top the First Division table in 2005, and therefore win a place in the Premier Division. He was with Sean Connor's "Bit o' Red" in 2006, as they recorded a fifth-place finish.

When Connor left Sligo for Bohemians at the end of the 2006 season, Burns soon followed him to Dalymount Park and became a regular in the first XI. A third-place finish in 2007 meant that they qualified for UEFA Intertoto Cup football. They also reached the final of the League of Ireland Cup, losing out to Derry City after Kevin McHugh's extra time strike at the Brandywell Stadium. Burns netted his first goal for "Bohs" against his former club Sligo on 21 March 2008 in a 2–1 win. Bohemians then went on to win the league in 2008 under new manager Pat Fenlon, thereby qualifying for UEFA Champions League football. Burns played in the 2008 FAI Cup final, as "Bohs" beat Derry on penalties in front of over 10,000 spectators at the Royal Dublin Society. During his two years with the club he played alongside Jason McGuinness and then Ken Oman. Burns's consistency was rewarded when he was voted on to the Premier Division Team for 2008, receiving 59% of the votes for the centre-back position.

After rejecting a new deal with the club, Burns reunited with former boss Sean Connor at Dundalk for the 2009 season. The Oriel Park side posted a fifth-place finish in 2009, though at the end of the season, two sides above them (Derry and Cork City) were demoted. Burns missed just two league games all season and scored against former club Sligo at the Showgrounds and against Shamrock Rovers at the Tallaght Stadium. Before the 2010 season started, Burns had been training with Shamrock, intending to join them. However, after the signing of Dan Murray, Burns was not going to be offered a contract, so he re-signed for Dundalk. He was named as captain. He played 27 games in league and cup, forming a defensive partnership with Garry Breen, scoring once in a home defeat to Bray Wanderers. At the end of the season, the "Lilywhites" finished sixth; Dundalk offered Burns another contract but again delayed in signing the contract to 'keep his options open'.

In February 2011, Burns returned to Dalymount Park for a second spell with Bohemians just in time for the new season. The "Gypsies" finished the 2011 season in fifth place under manager Pat Fenlon, with Burns playing in a centre-back partnership with Aidan Price.

In January 2012, Burns re-signed with Dundalk. They struggled in 2012 under Sean McCaffrey's stewardship. They finished bottom of the Premier Division (Monaghan United withdrew from the competition and had their record expunged).

== Management career ==
On 9 April 2024, Burns, alongside Brian Gartland, was appointed as the interim manager of Dundalk following the departure of head coach Stephen O'Donnell with the club bottom of the League of Ireland Premier Division with three points from eight games. Noel King was then named as the club's new manager, but resigned after 25 days on 15 May for medical reasons, with Burns again stepping up to become interim manager.

== Career statistics ==
Appearances and goals by club, season and competition
Club	Season	League			National cup (Note: Includes FA Cup, FAI Cup)		Other		Total	
Club	Season	Division	Apps	Goals	Apps	Goals	Apps	Goals	Apps	Goals
Port Vale	1997–98	First Division	1	0	0	0	0	0	1	0
Port Vale	1998–99	First Division	4	0	0	0	0	0	4	0
Port Vale	1999–2000	First Division	24	0	1	0	0	0	25	0
Port Vale	2000–01	Second Division	13	0	1	0	1	0	15	0
Port Vale	2001–02	Second Division	34	0	2	0	3	0	39	0
Port Vale	2002–03	Second Division	16	0	1	0	2	0	19	0
Port Vale	2003–04	Second Division	27	0	3	1	0	0	30	1
Port Vale	Total		119	0	8	1	6	0	133	1
Bristol Rovers	2004–05	League Two	3	0	1	0	1	0	5	0
Shrewsbury Town	2004–05	League Two	2	0	0	0	0	0	2	0
Kidderminster Harriers	2004–05	League Two	1	0	0	0	0	0	1	0
Forest Green Rovers	2004–05	Conference National	3	0	0	0	0	0	3	0
Dundalk	2009	League of Ireland Premier Division	30	2	0	0	0	0	30	2
Dundalk	2010	League of Ireland Premier Division	26	1	0	0	0	0	26	1
Dundalk	Total		56	3	0	0	0	0	56	3
Bohemians	2011	League of Ireland Premier Division	32	1	3	0	1	0	36	1
Dundalk	2012	League of Ireland Premier Division	23	0	2	0	3	0	28	0
Career total			239	4	14	1	11	0	264	5

== Honours ==
Sligo Rovers

- League of Ireland First Division: 2005

Bohemians

- League of Ireland: 2008
- FAI Cup: 2008
