= Richard Eyre (footballer) =

English footballer (born 1976)

Personal information
- Full name: Richard Paul Eyre
- Date of birth: 15 September 1976 (age 50)
- Place of birth: Stockport, England
- Height: 5 ft 8 in (1.73 m)
- Position: Midfielder

Youth career
- Port Vale

Senior career*
| Years | Team | Apps | (Gls) |
| 1995–2001 | Port Vale | 48 | (1) |
| 2001 | Macclesfield Town | 14 | (0) |
| 2002 | Kidsgrove Athletic | | |
| 2002 | Hyde United | 10 | (1) |
| 2002–2004 | Kidsgrove Athletic | | |
| 2004–2005 | Leek Town | 18 | (2) |
| 2005–2008 | Kidsgrove Athletic | | |
| 2008 | Congleton Town | 1 | (0) |
- * Club domestic league appearances and goals

Richard Paul Eyre (born 15 September 1976) is an English former footballer who played 62 league games in the Football League for Port Vale and Macclesfield Town between 1995 and 2001. The midfielder then went on to play non-League football for Kidsgrove Athletic, Hyde United, Leek Town, and Congleton Town. He helped Kidsgrove to top the North West Counties Football League in 2001–02.

== Career ==
Eyre began his career as a trainee with Port Vale, turning professional in June 1995. He made one First Division appearance under John Rudge in 1997–98, as a late substitute in a 3–1 defeat to Ipswich Town at Vale Park on 20 December. He featured eleven times in 1998–99, becoming a regular in the first team after Brian Horton was appointed as manager in January. He scored his first senior goal against Sheffield United in a 3–2 win at Bramall Lane on 23 November 1999, and finished the 1999–2000 relegation campaign with 33 appearances to his name. He played just six Second Division games in 2000–01, and switched to Macclesfield Town in August 2001. He made 14 appearances for the Third Division club in 2001–02. However, after learning that his contract would not be renewed by new boss David Moss, he left Moss Rose that December and joined Kidsgrove Athletic in March 2002. He helped Athletic to the North West Counties Football League title in 2001–02.

He joined Hyde United in August 2002, scoring two goals in eleven stars and three substitute appearances. He rejoined Kidsgrove two months later. They finished 19th in the Northern Premier League Division One in 2002–03, and last in 2003–04. In June 2004 he joined Leek Town. His final game for Leek was against Kidsgrove, who re-signed Eyre for a second time shortly after the match, which they lost 5–0. Kidsgrove finished 10th in 2004–05, 17th in 2005–06, 8th in 2006–07, and 17th in 2007–08. He retired in May 2008. However, he came out of retirement in November to play for Congleton Town.

== Career statistics ==
Appearances and goals by club, season and competition
| Club | Season | League | | | FA Cup | | Other | | Total | |
| Club | Season | Division | Apps | Goals | Apps | Goals | Apps | Goals | Apps | Goals |
|---|---|---|---|---|---|---|---|---|---|---|
| Port Vale | 1997–98 | First Division | 1 | 0 | 0 | 0 | 0 | 0 | 1 | 0 |
| Port Vale | 1998–99 | First Division | 11 | 0 | 0 | 0 | 0 | 0 | 11 | 0 |
| Port Vale | 1999–2000 | First Division | 30 | 1 | 1 | 0 | 2 | 0 | 33 | 1 |
| Port Vale | 2000–01 | Second Division | 6 | 0 | 0 | 0 | 2 | 0 | 8 | 0 |
| Port Vale | Total | | 48 | 1 | 1 | 0 | 4 | 0 | 53 | 1 |
| Macclesfield Town | 2001–02 | Third Division | 14 | 0 | 0 | 0 | 2 | 0 | 16 | 0 |
| Hyde United | 2002–03 | Northern Premier League | 10 | 1 | 2 | 1 | 2 | 0 | 14 | 2 |
| Leek Town | 2004–05 | Northern Premier League; Premier Division | 18 | 2 | 5 | 1 | 4 | 1 | 27 | 4 |

== Honours ==
Kidsgrove Athletic

- North West Counties Football League: 2001–02
