= Arjan van Heusden =

Dutch footballer

Personal information
- Full name: Arjan van Heusden
- Date of birth: 11 December 1972 (age 53)
- Place of birth: Alphen aan den Rijn, Netherlands
- Height: 6 ft 4 in (1.93 m)
- Position: Goalkeeper

Youth career
- 1993–1994: Noordwijk

Senior career*
Years	Team	Apps	(Gls)
1994–1998	Port Vale	27	(0)
1997	→ Oxford United (loan)	11	(0)
1998–2000	Cambridge United	42	(0)
2000–2002	Exeter City	74	(0)
2002	Mansfield Town	5	(0)
2002–2005	Torquay United	47	(0)
Total		206	(0)
- * Club domestic league appearances and goals

Arjan van Heusden (born 11 December 1972) is a Dutch retired football goalkeeper who played much of his career in the English Football League.

== Career ==
Van Heusden began his career in his native Netherlands with Noordwijk, moving to England in December 1993 for a trial with Port Vale, signing permanently in May 1994 for a fee of £4,500. He joined up with fellow Dutchman Robin van der Laan, who had already established himself in John Rudge's squad. However, Van Heusden failed to dislodge the ever-reliable Paul Musselwhite and so joined Oxford United on loan in September 1997, playing 11 league games.

In August 1998, he moved to Cambridge United on a free transfer. He played 42 league games in two seasons before moving to Exeter City in August 2000. He missed just five league games of the 2000–01 campaign. After stalling on Exeter's offer of a fresh contract in April 2002 he signed within the club's ten-day limit, though this failed to put an end to speculation over his future.

In August 2002, he joined Scottish side Clyde on a short-term deal before returning to England to play for Mansfield Town the following month as Mansfield were in the midst of a goalkeeping injury crisis. In November 2002 he joined Torquay United, initially on non-contract terms, later signing a longer contract after establishing himself as the first choice keeper. He struggled with injury in the 2004–05 season and subsequently retired from professional football and returned to the Netherlands where he resumed his playing career with Rijsburgse Boys, FC Lisse and ARC.

He has worked as a goalkeeping coach at hoemtown club ARC since 2016.

== Career statistics ==
Appearances and goals by club, season and competition
Club	Season	League			FA Cup		Other		Total	
Club	Season	Division	Apps	Goals	Apps	Goals	Apps	Goals	Apps	Goals
Port Vale	1994–95	First Division	2	0	0	0	0	0	2	0
Port Vale	1995–96	First Division	7	0	0	0	2	0	9	0
Port Vale	1996–97	First Division	13	0	0	0	4	0	17	0
Port Vale	1997–98	First Division	5	0	0	0	0	0	5	0
Port Vale	Total		27	0	0	0	6	0	33	0
Oxford United (loan)	1997–98	First Division	11	0	0	0	2	0	13	0
Cambridge United	1998–99	Third Division	27	0	0	0	7	0	34	0
Cambridge United	1999–2000	Second Division	15	0	1	0	3	0	19	0
Cambridge United	Total		42	0	1	0	10	0	53	0
Exeter City	2000–01	Third Division	41	0	1	0	1	0	43	0
Exeter City	2001–02	Third Division	33	0	3	0	2	0	38	0
Exeter City	Total		74	0	4	0	3	0	81	0
Mansfield Town	2002–03	Second Division	5	0	0	0	0	0	5	0
Torquay United	2002–03	Third Division	15	0	1	0	0	0	16	0
Torquay United	2003–04	Third Division	25	0	1	0	1	0	27	0
Torquay United	2004–05	League One	7	0	0	0	2	0	9	0
Torquay United	Total		47	0	2	0	3	0	52	0
Career total			206	0	7	0	24	0	237	0
