= Ville Viljanen =

Finnish footballer (born 1971)

Personal information
- Full name: Ville Viljanen
- Date of birth: 2 February 1971 (age 55)
- Place of birth: Helsinki, Finland
- Height: 6 ft 2 in (1.88 m)
- Position: Striker

Youth career
- 1994: Sandarna BK

Senior career*
| Years | Team | Apps | (Gls) |
| 1995–1998 | BK Häcken | 71 | (15) |
| 1999 | Västra Frölunda IF | 20 | (2) |
| 2000–2001 | Port Vale | 33 | (6) |
| 2001–2004 | GAIS | 75 | (24) |
| Total | | 199 | (47) |

International career
| 1999 | Finland | 1 | (0) |
- * Club domestic league appearances and goals

Ville Viljanen (born 2 February 1971) is a Finnish former international footballer. A striker, he scored 47 goals in 200 league games in a nine-year career, and won one cap for Finland in 1999.

He played in Sweden with Sandarna BK, BK Häcken, and Västra Frölunda IF between 1994 and 1999, helping Häcken to promotion out of Division 1 as play-off winners in 1997. He joined the English club Port Vale in February 2000 and was an unused substitute in the 2001 Football League Trophy final. He then returned to Sweden with GAIS, helping the club to two promotions from Division 2 to Allsvenskan before he retired in 2005.

== Career ==
Viljanen began his career in Sweden with Sandarna BK, before he moved to Division 1 side BK Häcken in 1995. They finished fourth in 1996 and second in 1997, beating Västerås SK Fotboll 5–3 in the play-offs to win promotion into the Allsvenskan. They were relegated automatically in 1998, finishing one point behind Örgryte IS in the play-offs. He scored 15 goals in 71 league games for the club. He then moved on to Västra Frölunda IF and made 20 appearances for the club in 1999, as they posted a 7th-place finish in the top-flight. In February 2000, he moved to England to sign for Brian Horton's Port Vale. He scored his first goal for the club on 7 March, in a 2–1 defeat to Crewe Alexandra at Gresty Road, and finished the 1999–2000 campaign with four goals in 14 games. He was one of five players placed on the transfer list in December 2000 following a humiliating defeat to non-League Canvey Island in the FA Cup. He finished the 2000–01 campaign with two goals in 23 appearances. He was an unused substitute in the 2001 Football League Trophy final. He then returned to Sweden to play for GAIS. They were relegated out of the Superettan in 2001, finishing behind Assyriska on goal difference. GAIS finished second in Division 2 in 2002, before winning promotion as Västra Götaland champions in 2003, finishing above Ljungskile SK on goal difference. The Gamla Ullevi club finished sixth in the Superettan in 2004.

== Career statistics ==
Appearances and goals by club, season and competition
| Club | Season | League | | | FA Cup | | Other | | Total | |
| Club | Season | Division | Apps | Goals | Apps | Goals | Apps | Goals | Apps | Goals |
|---|---|---|---|---|---|---|---|---|---|---|
| BK Häcken | 1996 | Division 1 | 26 | 7 | | | | | | |
| BK Häcken | 1997 | Division 1 | 19 | 5 | | | | | | |
| BK Häcken | 1998 | Allsvenskan | 26 | 3 | | | | | | |
| BK Häcken | Total | | 71 | 15 | | | | | | |
| Västra Frölunda IF | 1999 | Allsvenskan | 20 | 2 | | | | | | |
| Port Vale | 1999–2000 | First Division | 14 | 4 | — | | — | | 14 | 4 |
| Port Vale | 2000–01 | Second Division | 19 | 2 | 1 | 0 | 3 | 0 | 23 | 2 |
| Port Vale | Total | | 33 | 6 | 1 | 0 | 3 | 0 | 37 | 6 |
| GAIS | 2001 | Superettan | 11 | 1 | | | | | | |
| GAIS | 2002 | Division 2 | 21 | 7 | | | | | | |
| GAIS | 2003 | Division 2 | 22 | 13 | | | | | | |
| GAIS | 2004 | Superettan | 21 | 3 | | | | | | |
| GAIS | Total | | 74 | 24 | | | | | | |

== Honours ==
BK Häcken

- Swedish Football Division 1 play-offs: 1997

Port Vale

- Football League Trophy: 2000–01

GAIS

- Swedish football Division 2 Västra Götaland: 2003
