= Sagi Burton =

English-born Kittitian footballer

Personal information
- Full name: Osagyefo Lenin Ernesto Burton-Godwin
- Date of birth: 25 November 1977 (age 48)
- Place of birth: Birmingham, England
- Height: 1.88 m (6 ft 2 in)
- Position: Defender

Youth career
- 1993–1994: Bolton Wanderers

Senior career*
Years	Team	Apps	(Gls)
1994–1999	Crystal Palace	25	(1)
1999	Colchester United	9	(0)
1999–2000	Sheffield United	0	(0)
2000–2002	Port Vale	86	(2)
2002	Crewe Alexandra	1	(0)
2002–2006	Peterborough United	96	(4)
2006–2007	Shrewsbury Town	44	(5)
2007–2008	Barnet	30	(1)
2008	Rushden & Diamonds	11	(0)
Total		302	(13)

International career
2004	Saint Kitts and Nevis	3	(0)
- * Club domestic league appearances and goals

Osagyefo Lenin Ernesto Burton-Godwin (born 25 November 1977), known commonly as Sagi Burton, is an English-born former Kittitian international football defender. In a 14-year professional career in English football, he made 344 appearances in league and cup competitions.

A former Bolton Wanderers trainee, he began his career with Crystal Palace in 1994. Failing to establish himself in the first team during his five years at the club, he joined Sheffield United via Colchester United in 1999. The following year, he signed with Port Vale, where he first found regular football. In 2002, he transferred to Peterborough United via Crewe Alexandra. Four years later, he moved on to Shrewsbury Town before spending the 2007–08 campaign with Barnet. He retired from the game following a brief spell with Rushden & Diamonds in 2008.

== Club career ==
Born of Kittitian and of Jamaican descent, Burton began his footballing career as a trainee at Bolton Wanderers before switching to Crystal Palace on 1 August 1994. He went on to make his début in the Premier League match at Derby County on 20 December 1997. He played in a goalless draw at Pride Park for ninety minutes. Following Palace's relegation, he played 23 of the club's 46 First Division matches in the following season. Despite this, he was still allowed to drop down a division to join Colchester United for a nominal fee on 7 August 1999. After making just twelve appearances in league and cup competitions, by 15 October he was on his way to back into the First Division after signing for Sheffield United on a free transfer. This spell would prove to be a brief one, and in January 2000, he joined Brian Horton's Port Vale, also of the First Division, again on a free transfer. He made 22 appearances for the Staffordshire club in 1999–2000 and found himself on the scoresheet in home draws with Charlton Athletic and Barnsley. He established himself as "a powerful presence" and "impressive in the air". Despite this, Vale were relegated at the end of the season.

He went on to make 37 appearances in 2000–01, including the club's Football League Trophy success over Brentford at the Millennium Stadium. He achieved this honour despite having been transfer-listed in December. By 2001–02 he was an essential first-team player and played 42 of the club's 53 games in league and cup. Despite this, he was not retained beyond the summer and promptly joined Crewe Alexandra on a short-term deal.

After just one game in three weeks, Burton and Crewe parted ways, and he went to join Peterborough United, also of the Second Division, on a one-year deal as a utility player. He played 33 times for the "Posh" in 2002–03, though it would be Crewe who won promotion out of the division following their second-place finish. He played 34 games in the 2003–04 campaign as Peterborough successfully avoided relegation, and Burton overcame a hamstring injury and a knee problem.

Appointed as the club's vice-captain, he made 16 league appearances in the inaugural season of League One football. Missing five months with a shoulder injury, he could do little to prevent the club from suffering relegation into League Two. Recovering from a pre-season foot injury, he made 24 appearances in the first half of the 2005–06 campaign, before making a January move to league rivals to Shrewsbury Town, despite reported interest from Macclesfield Town and SPL side Falkirk. He settled in quickly at his new club, and put in solid performances at centre-back. Despite injury and suspension hampering his first few months at the "Shrews", he still netted four times in 16 games for the Shropshire club in the latter half of the 2005–06 season. After recovering from a short illness, he made 33 appearances in 2006–07, helping Shrewsbury to secure a play-off place. He was a late substitute for Ben Herd during the club's play-off final defeat to Bristol Rovers. Following the defeat he was released by the club.

After a successful trial, he signed with Barnet for the 2007–08 campaign. He served as vice-captain at the club, but was not retained beyond summer 2008, despite having formed a strong defensive partnership with Ismail Yakubu. In July 2008, Conference National club Rushden & Diamonds announced that Burton had signed with them until the end of the 2008–09 season. He made his debut in the final of the Maunsell Cup on 26 July 2008, captaining Rushen to victory over former club Peterborough United. However, he was released in November after making just eleven appearances.

== International career ==
Burton won three caps for Saint Kitts and Nevis in 2004. He made his debut on 2 June in a 2–0 friendly defeat to Northern Ireland.

In autumn 2006, he turned down the chance to play in the Caribbean Cup for his country, preferring instead to stay with Shrewsbury to play league games against Hartlepool United and Darlington.

== Later life ==
Burton worked as a fitness instructor in West London after his footballing retirement.

== Career statistics ==
Appearances and goals by club, season and competition
Season	Club	League			FA Cup		League Cup		Other		Total	
Season	Club	Division	Apps	Goals	Apps	Goals	Apps	Goals	Apps	Goals	Apps	Goals
Crystal Palace	1994–95	Premier League	0	0	0	0	0	0	—		0	0
Crystal Palace	1995–96	First Division	0	0	0	0	0	0	—		0	0
Crystal Palace	1996–97	First Division	0	0	0	0	0	0	—		0	0
Crystal Palace	1997–98	Premier League	2	0	1	0	0	0	—		3	0
Crystal Palace	1998–99	First Division	23	1	0	0	1	0	1	0	25	1
Crystal Palace	Total		25	1	1	0	1	0	1	0	28	1
Colchester United	1999–2000	Second Division	9	0	0	0	3	0	0	0	12	0
Sheffield United	1999–2000	First Division	0	0	0	0	—		—		0	0
Port Vale	1999–2000	First Division	20	2	—		—		—		20	2
Port Vale	2000–01	Second Division	29	0	1	0	2	1	5 (Note: Appearance(s) in the Football League Trophy / EFL Trophy)	0	37	1
Port Vale	2001–02	Second Division	37	0	2	0	1	0	2	1	42	1
Port Vale	Total		86	2	3	0	3	1	7	1	99	4
Crewe Alexandra	2002–03	Second Division	1	0	0	0	0	0	0	0	1	0
Peterborough United	2002–03	Second Division	31	0	1	0	1	0	0	0	33	0
Peterborough United	2003–04	Second Division	30	1	1	0	1	0	2	1	34	2
Peterborough United	2004–05	League One	16	1	3	0	0	0	0	0	19	1
Peterborough United	2005–06	League Two	19	2	1	0	1	0	3	0	24	2
Peterborough United	Total		96	4	6	0	3	0	5	1	110	5
Shrewsbury Town	2005–06	League Two	16	4	—		—		—		16	4
Shrewsbury Town	2006–07	League Two	28	1	1	0	1	0	3 (Note: 1 appearance in the EFL Trophy and 2 appearances in the play-offs)	0	33	1
Shrewsbury Town	Total		44	5	1	0	1	0	3	0	49	5
Barnet	2007–08	League Two	30	1	2	0	1	0	1	0	34	1
Rushden & Diamonds	2008–09	Conference National	11	0	0	0	—		1 (Note: Appearance in the Maunsell Cup)	0	12	0
Career total			302	13	13	0	12	1	18	2	345	16

== Honours ==
Port Vale

- Football League Trophy: 2000–01

Crewe Alexandra

- Football League Second Division second-place promotion: 2002–03

Rushden & Diamonds

- Maunsell Cup: 2008
