= Tony Naylor =

English footballer (born 1967)

Personal information
- Full name: Anthony Joseph Naylor
- Date of birth: 29 March 1967 (age 59)
- Place of birth: Manchester, England
- Height: 5 ft 7 in (1.70 m)
- Position: Forward

Senior career*
Years	Team	Apps	(Gls)
19??–1990	Droylsden		
1990–1994	Crewe Alexandra	122	(45)
1994–2001	Port Vale	253	(72)
2001–2003	Cheltenham Town	74	(18)
2003–2004	Telford United	19	(10)
2005	Port Vale	0	(0)
2006	Ashton United	1	(2)
Total		469	(147)
- * Club domestic league appearances and goals

Anthony Joseph Naylor (born 29 March 1967) is an English former professional footballer who played as a forward. He is best known for his spells at Port Vale and Crewe Alexandra in the 1990s.

Naylor moved to Dario Gradi's Crewe from non-League Droylsden in 1990, turning professional at the age of 23. After two successive promotion-hunting campaigns ended at the play-off stage, he helped Alex to automatic promotion in 1993–94. His goals impressed John Rudge at nearby Port Vale, and a £150,000 deal was struck between the two rival clubs in 1994. He went on to spend the next seven years at Vale Park, playing in the Anglo-Italian Cup final in 1996, as well as the club's Football League Trophy success in 2001. Three times Vale's top-scorer, he left on a free transfer to Cheltenham Town in 2001. He helped Cheltenham to win promotion via the play-offs in 2002 before he entered the non-League scene with Telford United in 2003. He retired as a player in 2005, though he would make a brief cameo at Ashton United in 2006.

== Career ==
=== Crewe Alexandra ===
Naylor began his career at non-League Droylsden. Having caught the eye of Crewe Alexandra boss Dario Gradi, the 23-year-old striker completed an £11,000 switch to the "Railwaymen" in March 1990. His new club went on to be relegated at the end of the season, however, Naylor helped Crewe to the Fourth Division play-offs in 1991. Hopes of an immediate return to the third tier were then dashed after defeat to Scunthorpe United at the semi-final stage. He helped them into the play-off final the following year. At that point, they lost out to York City in a penalty shoot-out at Wembley. On the way to the final he set a club record for most goals in a match when he scored five in a game against Colchester United on 24 April 1993. Promotion finally came in 1993–94, as Naylor's goals helped to assure Alex of the third automatic promotion place. However, he looked for a move away after only being offered a £50-per-week pay rise on his new contract.

=== Port Vale ===
On 14 July 1994, Naylor joined Port Vale on a three-year contract for a fee of £150,000 that was agreed to avoid Vale and Crewe undergoing a transfer tribunal. John Rudge's "Valiants" spent the money after sealing promotion from the Second Division on the last day of the 1993–94 season. Naylor would join the side for the new season in the First Division. He soon formed a very effective strike partnership with Martin Foyle. On 14 March 1995, Naylor scored in a 1–1 draw with Stoke City in a Potteries derby game at Vale Park. He came off the bench in the 1996 Anglo-Italian Cup final, as Vale lost 5–2 to Genoa. He was with the "Valiants" through one of the club's most successful periods as they finished eighth in the 1996–97 First Division (the club's highest finish since the 1930s), with Naylor claiming 20 goals in 49 appearances, including a hat-trick past Charlton Athletic whilst playing as a lone striker in a 3–1 win at The Valley on 14 December After the match he said he hated playing as a lone striker but conceded that "it worked ok today".

In total, he managed to notch 90 goals in his seven years at the club, finishing as the club's top goalscorer at the end of the 1995–96, 1996–97 and 2000–01 seasons with 12, 20 and 21 goals respectively. He scored a brace in a 3–1 win over Sunderland on 23 August 1997, showing his "sublime skill" as his "twinkling feet made them statuesque". He nutmegged Andy Melville on a run that began just inside the Sunderland half and ended with a swerving right-foot shot into the corner of the net. He lost his first-team place in the 1999–2000 relegation season as new manager Brian Horton preferred Manchester United loanee David Healy. He regained his place in the first XI in the 2000–01 campaign, when he formed a strike partnership with Steve Brooker and scored 20 goals. The club also managed to win the Football League Trophy in 2001, as they defeated Brentford 2–1 in the final at the Millennium Stadium in Cardiff; he won a penalty and also had a goal ruled out for offside. Naylor's last goal for the club was also the last goal at Oxford United's Manor Ground in May 2001. Naylor left the club after rejecting a two-year contract that would see him take a 40% pay cut.

=== Cheltenham Town ===
On 12 July 2001, Naylor signed a two-year contract with Cheltenham Town. His goals guided the Robins to promotion to League One, via the play-offs, in his first season. He started in the final, a 3–1 victory over Rushden & Diamonds. It was the first time Cheltenham had been that high in the Football League pyramid. Manager Steve Cotterill was keen to praise Naylor, as was his successor Graham Allner. However, he was unable to prevent relegation the following season and was released at the end of the 2002–03 campaign after rejecting new manager Bobby Gould's new contract offer.

=== Telford United ===
Following a brief stay at Stone Dominoes, Naylor joined Conference National club Telford United shortly into the 2003–04 campaign, linking up with one of his strike partners from his Port Vale days in Lee Mills. Naylor quickly endeared himself to the supporters at the New Bucks Head with his trademark pacey and tenacious displays particularly when he scored the second goal in a 2–1 victory of local rivals Shrewsbury Town in the FA Trophy. Naylor eventually made 29 appearances during the season, scoring 11 goals. Despite helping Telford to reach the fourth round of the FA Cup and the semi-finals of the FA Trophy, United were beset by off the field problems during the final few months of the 2003–04 season and folded at the end of the campaign after their finances spiralled out of control. Naylor was again on the lookout for a new club and was linked with a move to Shrewsbury Town after his impressive displays against them for Telford, but this never materialised. After several fruitless trials, he eventually retired from the professional game.

=== Later career ===
Naylor joined his former club, Port Vale, in March 2005, now managed by his former strike partner Martin Foyle, but did not play a first-team game. During the 2005–06 season Naylor joined Northern Premier League Premier Division club Ashton United as assistant to the manager Scott Green, a former teammate of his from their Telford days. When an injury crisis hit the club, he donned his boots once more and scored twice from the penalty spot in a 2–2 draw at Frickley Athletic.

== Style of play ==
Naylor was a forward who used his pace to make runs in behind defenders and also to chase the ball down and try and tackle defenders. In May 2019, he was voted into the "Ultimate Port Vale XI" by members of the OneValeFan supporter website.

== Personal life ==
Naylor grew up supporting Manchester City. He organised charity matches between Port Vale Legends and Stoke City Legends in the 2010s, raising money for dementia and Alzheimer's causes after his father was diagnosed with Alzheimer's.

== Career statistics ==
Appearances and goals by club, season and competition
Club	Season	League			FA Cup		Other		Total	
Club	Season	Division	Apps	Goals	Apps	Goals	Apps	Goals	Apps	Goals
Crewe Alexandra	1989–90	Third Division	2	0	0	0	0	0	2	0
Crewe Alexandra	1990–91	Third Division	14	1	0	0	2	0	16	1
Crewe Alexandra	1991–92	Fourth Division	34	15	4	3	9	7	47	25
Crewe Alexandra	1992–93	Third Division	35	16	2	2	8	7	45	25
Crewe Alexandra	1993–94	Third Division	37	13	3	1	4	2	44	16
Crewe Alexandra	Total		122	45	9	6	23	16	154	67
Port Vale	1994–95	First Division	33	9	0	0	3	1	36	10
Port Vale	1995–96	First Division	39	11	6	1	6	3	51	15
Port Vale	1996–97	First Division	43	17	1	0	5	3	49	20
Port Vale	1997–98	First Division	38	10	2	0	2	0	42	10
Port Vale	1998–99	First Division	22	4	1	0	2	2	25	6
Port Vale	1999–2000	First Division	36	6	1	0	2	2	39	8
Port Vale	2000–01	Second Division	42	15	2	1	9	5	53	21
Port Vale	Total		253	72	13	2	29	16	295	90
Cheltenham Town	2001–02	Third Division	44	12	5	5	5	1	54	18
Cheltenham Town	2002–03	Second Division	30	6	0	0	2	2	32	8
Cheltenham Town	Total		74	18	5	5	7	3	86	26
Port Vale	2004–05	League One	0	0	—		—		0	0
Career total			449	135	27	13	59	35	535	183

== Honours ==
Crewe Alexandra

- Football League Third Division third-place promotion: 1993–94

Port Vale

- Football League Trophy: 2000–01
- Anglo-Italian Cup runner-up: 1996

Cheltenham Town

- Football League Third Division play-offs: 2002

Individual

- Port Vale F.C. Hall of Fame: inducted 2026 (inaugural)
