= Steve Brooker =

English footballer (born 1981)

Personal information
- Full name: Stephen Michael Lord Brooker
- Date of birth: 21 May 1981 (age 45)
- Place of birth: Newport Pagnell, England
- Height: 5 ft 10 in (1.78 m)
- Position: Forward

Youth career
- 1997–1999: Watford

Senior career*
Years	Team	Apps	(Gls)
1999–2001	Watford	1	(0)
2001	→ Port Vale (loan)	2	(0)
2001–2004	Port Vale	129	(36)
2004–2009	Bristol City	101	(37)
2008	→ Cheltenham Town (loan)	14	(5)
2008	→ Doncaster Rovers (loan)	1	(1)
2009–2011	Doncaster Rovers	13	(1)
2012	Buxton		
Total		261	(80)
- * Club domestic league appearances and goals

Stephen Michael Lord Brooker (born 21 May 1981) is an English former professional footballer who played as a forward. He scored 86 goals from 294 league and cup appearances in a 12-year professional career.

He began his career with Watford in 1999 before moving on to Port Vale in 2001, following a short loan spell. With Vale, he won the Football League Trophy in 2001. He transferred to Bristol City in 2004, where he would spend the next five years. In 2008, he spent time on loan at both Cheltenham Town and Doncaster Rovers before he joined Doncaster permanently in 2009. He spent two years with the club before he was released due to injury concerns. He signed with Buxton in October 2012.

== Career ==
Brooker came through the youth system at Watford before joining Port Vale, initially on loan, in January 2001. He scored his first goal in senior football in his second appearance, a 3–0 home win over Notts County in the Football League Trophy. He was signed by manager Brian Horton on the recommendation of coach Martin Foyle (who would succeed Horton as manager in February 2004). He signed permanently two weeks later on a two-and-a-half-year deal for a transfer fee of £15,000. Other clubs were reportedly interested in the player after his impressive loan stint, but Watford manager Graham Taylor stuck to the original transfer terms agreed upon before the loan began. He helped the "Valiants" to lift the 2001 Football League Trophy after he scored past Brentford in the final.

Forced to undergo a hernia operation at the start of the 2002–03 season, he recovered to score five goals in thirty games. After he recovered from a hamstring injury that caused him to miss a month at the start of the 2003–04 season, he went on to finish the campaign with eight goals in 34 games.

He started the 2004–05 season in tremendous form, scoring for four successive league games in August, including a brace past Hull City. With his contract up in the summer, the next month he was sold to Bristol City for a fee of £225,000. This came days after fans were told he was not for sale and would not be moving by Vale chairman Bill Bratt – a statement that convinced City chairman Stephen Lansdown that "we must now look elsewhere." He went on to have a highly successful season with City, scoring 16 goals for the club, despite suffering from a broken toe. This gave him a total of 21 goals for both Vale and City in 2004–05, and won him another year on his contract with City. This extended deal quashed rumours of a move to Norwich City.

He was both the club's Player of the Season and top scorer in the 2005–06 season with 16 league goals, one of these goals came against former club Port Vale after the player claimed that the boo-boys at Vale Park inspired him to find the net. His form helped the club go from the bottom of the league in December, to finish just six points shy of the play-offs. He was rewarded with a new deal with the club despite having two years remaining on his contract.

He scored three goals in 27 games during City's 2006–07 promotion-winning campaign. However, on his release from prison in September, he found himself battling a catalogue of injuries, that would go on to plague him for several years. He missed the start of the campaign with hamstring and knee injuries, and picked up a further knee injury in April, which caused him to miss the club's pre-season tour of Latvia.

He missed much of the 2007–08 season after being forced to undergo two knee operations. In January Brooker was made available for a loan spell to regain fitness, and twenty clubs put in offers. After recovering from illness and a further back injury, he joined Keith Downing's League One side Cheltenham Town on a one-month loan. This deal was later extended by another month. Playing 14 games with the "Robins", he scored his five goals for the club in the space of six matches, helping the club to avoid relegation into League Two. His form persuaded manager Gary Johnson to re-call him to Bristol. On his return to City he scored an emotional late goal against Norwich to send his club top of the table; however, the "Reds" would have to settle with a play-off place. Overall, he played just four games of the club's march to the play-off final with Hull City, and was not named on the teamsheet in the final itself. Cheltenham were hopeful of signing the striker in the summer, but were denied the chance to have him back on loan, despite City having six strikers on the books.

He started the 2008–09 season well by coming off the bench to get the late winners at Blackpool, Peterborough United, and Coventry City. However, he was then struck down by an Achilles injury. On the November loan window deadline day, he joined Doncaster Rovers on a one-month loan with a view to a permanent deal. He came on as a substitute for his Rovers debut against Watford and scored with his first touch to give his new team a 1–1 draw. However, he suffered a tore calf muscle in training and returned to Ashton Gate. He returned to Rovers permanently for an undisclosed fee in January 2009, penning a two-and-a-half-year deal despite not being fully fit. He was initially expected to be rested for two weeks, but soon found himself out of action on a long-term basis after requiring an operation to fix an ankle injury.

He missed the entirety of the 2009–10 campaign with his injury problems. In the 2010–11 campaign he finally made his second appearance for the club, and on 30 April, Brooker scored his second goal for "Donny" when he blasted a 25 half-volley into the net to earn his club a 1–1 draw with Leicester City – the point ensured his club safety from relegation. However, he was still released from the club at the end of the season.

In October 2012, he joined Northern Premier League Premier Division side Buxton after training with the "Bucks" for several weeks trying to build his fitness. The club finished seventh in 2012–13.

== Style of play ==
Brooker was a forward with aggression and strength.

== Personal life ==
On 1 September 2006, Brooker was sentenced to prison for 28 days for his part in a 2005 nightclub brawl, which also saw his Bristol City teammates Bradley Orr and David Partridge imprisoned. Two weeks later, he and Orr were released on licence, having served half of their original sentence in custody. The sentence was described by City chairman Stephen Lansdown as 'harsh'.

== Career statistics ==
Appearances and goals by club, season and competition
Club	Season	League			FA Cup		League Cup		Other		Total	
Club	Season	Division	Apps	Goals	Apps	Goals	Apps	Goals	Apps	Goals	Apps	Goals
Watford	1999–2000	Premier League	1	0	1	0	0	0	—		2	0
Watford	2000–01	First Division	0	0	0	0	0	0	—		0	0
Watford	Total		1	0	1	0	0	0	0	0	2	0
Port Vale	2000–01	Second Division	23	9	0	0	0	0	5 (Note: Appearance(s) in the EFL Trophy.)	2	28	11
Port Vale	2001–02	Second Division	41	9	2	1	2	0	3	1	48	11
Port Vale	2002–03	Second Division	26	5	1	0	1	0	2	0	30	5
Port Vale	2003–04	Second Division	32	8	1	0	1	0	0	0	34	8
Port Vale	2004–05	League One	9	5	0	0	1	0	1	0	11	5
Port Vale	Total		131	36	4	1	5	0	11	3	151	40
Bristol City	2004–05	League One	33	16	1	0	0	0	0	0	34	16
Bristol City	2005–06	League One	37	16	1	0	1	0	0	0	39	16
Bristol City	2006–07	League One	23	2	2	1	0	0	2	0	27	3
Bristol City	2007–08	Championship	4	1	0	0	0	0	0	0	4	1
Bristol City	2008–09	Championship	4	2	0	0	2	1	—		6	3
Bristol City	Total		101	37	4	1	3	1	2	0	110	39
Cheltenham Town (loan)	2007–08	League One	14	5	—		—		—		14	5
Doncaster Rovers	2008–09	Championship	1	1	0	0	—		—		1	1
Doncaster Rovers	2009–10	Championship	0	0	0	0	0	0	—		0	0
Doncaster Rovers	2010–11	Championship	13	1	2	0	1	0	—		16	1
Doncaster Rovers	Total		14	2	2	0	1	0	0	0	17	2
Career total (Note: Statistics for Buxton not recorded.)			261	80	11	2	9	1	13	3	294	86

== Honours ==
Port Vale

- Football League Trophy: 2000–01

Bristol City

- Football League One second-place promotion: 2006–07

Individual

- Bristol City Player of the Season: 2005–06
