= 2000–01 Football League Trophy =

LDV Vans Trophy

Tournament details
- Country: England; Wales
- Teams: 56

Final positions
- Champions: Port Vale
- Runners-up: Brentford

Tournament statistics
- Matches played: 57

The Football League Trophy 2000–01, known as the LDV Vans Trophy 2000–01 for sponsorship reasons, was the 20th staging of the Football League Trophy, a knock-out competition for English football clubs in Second and Third Division. The winners were Port Vale and the runners-up were Brentford.

The competition began on 28 November 2000 and ended with the final on 22 April 2001 at the Millennium Stadium.

In the first round, there were two sections: North and South. In the following rounds each section gradually eliminates teams in knock-out fashion until each has a winning finalist. At this point, the two winning finalists face each other in the combined final for the honour of the trophy. In addition to the 48 league teams, 8 Conference teams were also invited.

== First round ==
Blackpool, Macclesfield Town, Shrewsbury Town and Walsall from the North section all received byes.

Leyton Orient, Reading, Swansea City and Swindon from the South section all received byes.

=== Northern Section ===
Date	Home team	Score	Away team
28 November	Lincoln City	3–2	Morecambe
5 December	Chester City	1–0	Hull City
5 December	Doncaster Rovers	3–2	Rochdale
5 December	Rotherham United	3–4	Chesterfield
6 December	Stoke City	3–1	Scarborough
9 December	Bury	2–1	Mansfield Town
9 December	Wrexham	0–1	Halifax Town
11 December	Hartlepool United	3–2	Scunthorpe United
12 December	Kidderminster Harriers	2–1	Carlisle United
9 January	Oldham Athletic	2–3	Wigan Athletic
9 January	Port Vale	3–0	Notts County
9 January	York City	0–4	Darlington

=== Southern Section ===
Date	Home team	Score	Away team
28 November	Barnet	2–0	Rushden & Diamonds
5 December	Bournemouth	1–1	Dover Athletic
Bournemouth won 4-2 on penalties
5 December	Brentford	4–1	Oxford United
5 December	Brighton & Hove Albion	2–0	Cardiff City
5 December	Cambridge United	2–0	Colchester United
5 December	Millwall	4–1	Northampton Town
5 December	Peterborough United	1–0	Luton Town
5 December	Plymouth Argyle	3–0	Bristol City
5 December	Southend United	2–0	Cheltenham Town
5 December	Wycombe Wanderers	1–0	Exeter City
9 December	Torquay United	0–2	Bristol Rovers
19 December	Hereford United	4–0	Yeovil Town

== Second round ==
=== Northern Section ===
Date	Home team	Score	Away team
9 January	Chesterfield	4–2	Macclesfield Town
9 January	Halifax Town	2–3	Stoke City
9 January	Hartlepool United	3–1	Doncaster Rovers
9 January	Lincoln City	3–1	Blackpool
10 January	Bury	2–0	Kidderminster Harriers
10 January	Darlington	2–0	Shrewsbury Town
16 January	Port Vale	2–0	Chester City
30 January	Walsall	2–1	Wigan Athletic

=== Southern Section ===
Date	Home team	Score	Away team
9 January	Bournemouth	0–1	Swansea City
9 January	Brighton and Hove Albion	2–2	Brentford
Brentford won 4-2 on penalties (Played at Brentford)
9 January	Bristol Rovers	3–0	Plymouth Argyle
9 January	Hereford United	1–2	Reading
9 January	Leyton Orient	0–2	Wycombe Wanderers
9 January	Millwall	0–0	Swindon Town
Swindon won 3-2 on penalties
9 January	Peterborough United	1–3	Barnet
9 January	Southend	3–1	Cambridge United

== Quarter-finals ==
=== Northern Section ===
Date	Home team	Score	Away team
30 January	Bury	0–3	Chesterfield
30 January	Lincoln City	1–0	Hartlepool United
6 February	Port Vale	4–0	Darlington
7 February	Stoke City	4–0	Walsall

=== Southern Section ===
Date	Home team	Score	Away team
30 January	Barnet	1–2	Brentford
30 January	Southend United	1–0	Bristol Rovers
30 January	Swansea City	1–0	Reading
30 January	Swindon Town	2–1	Wycombe Wanderers

== Area semi-finals ==
=== Northern Section ===
Date	Home team	Score	Away team
13 February	Lincoln City	4–1	Chesterfield
13 February	Port Vale	2–1	Stoke City
Played at Stoke City's Britannia Stadium

=== Southern Section ===
Date	Home team	Score	Away team
13 February	Southend United	2–1	Swindon Town
14 February	Swansea City	2–3	Brentford

== Area finals ==
=== Northern Area final ===
2001-03-13

Lincoln City	0–2	Port Vale
	(Report)	Bridge-Wilkinson 53'; Naylor 85'

Sincil Bank, Lincoln
Attendance: 4,813

2001-03-20

Port Vale	0–0	Lincoln City
	(Report)

Vale Park, Stoke-on-Trent
Attendance: 5,172

=== Southern Area final ===
2001-03-13

Southend United	1–2	Brentford
Whelan 57'	(Report)	Dobson 56'; Dobson 64'

Roots Hall, Southend-on-Sea
Attendance: 5,055

2001-03-20

Brentford	2–1	Southend United
Ingimarsson 13'; Owusu 78'	(Report)	Searle

Griffin Park, Brentford
Attendance: 6,579

== Final ==
2001-04-22
15:00 BST

Port Vale	2–1	Brentford
Bridge-Wilkinson 76' (pen.); Brooker 83'	(Report)	Dobson 3'

Millennium Stadium, Cardiff
Attendance: 25,654
Referee: William Burns

Port Vale	Brentford

PORT VALE:
GK	1	(England) Mark Goodlad
DF	2	(England) Matt Carragher (c)
DF	6	(England) Sagi Burton
DF	5	(England) Michael Walsh
DF	19	(England) Alex Smith
MF	8	(Republic of Ireland) Micky Cummins
MF	25	(England) Steve Brooker
MF	15	(England) Marc Bridge-Wilkinson
MF	17	(England) Neil Brisco
MF	4	(England) Dave Brammer	Yellow card
FW	10	(England) Tony Naylor
Substitutes:
GK	12	(Republic of Ireland) Dean Delany
DF	3	(England) Allen Tankard
MF	11	(England) Tommy Widdrington
MF	23	(England) Michael Twiss
FW	9	(Finland) Ville Viljanen
Manager:
(England) Brian Horton

BRENTFORD:
GK	17	(Iceland) Ólafur Gottskálksson
DF	5	(England) Darren Powell	Yellow card
DF	23	(England) David Theobald	Yellow card
DF	19	(England) Paul Gibbs
DF	25	(England) Michael Dobson
DF	15	(Iceland) Ívar Ingimarsson
MF	8	(England) Gavin Mahon
MF	12	(England) Martin Rowlands
MF	7	(Wales) Paul Evans (c)
FW	9	(Ghana) Lloyd Owusu
FW	10	(England) Scott Partridge
Substitute:
GK	31	(England) Paul Smith
DF	32	(England) Jay Lovett
MF	14	(Republic of Ireland) Tony Folan
MF	26	(England) Mark Williams	(substituted on) 88'
FW	29	(Barbados) Mark McCammon	(substituted on) 89'
Manager:
(England) Ray Lewington

MATCH RULES

- 90 minutes.
- 30 minutes of extra-time if necessary.
- Penalty shoot-out if scores still level.
- Maximum of 3 substitutions.
