= Allen Tankard =

English footballer (born 1969)

Personal information
- Full name: Allen John Tankard
- Date of birth: 21 May 1969 (age 57)
- Place of birth: Islington, England
- Height: 5 ft 10 in (1.78 m)
- Position: Left-back

Youth career
- 1985: Southampton

Senior career*
Years	Team	Apps	(Gls)
1985–1988	Southampton	5	(0)
1988–1993	Wigan Athletic	209	(4)
1993–2001	Port Vale	275	(11)
2001–2003	Mansfield Town	30	(2)
2003	Hednesford Town	1	(0)
2003	Stafford Rangers	0	(0)
Total		520	(17)

International career
- England U17
- * Club domestic league appearances and goals

Allen John Tankard (born 21 March 1969) is an English former footballer who played as a left-back. He played 519 league games in a 16-year career in the Football League.

He began his career with Southampton in 1987 before moving on to Wigan Athletic the following year. He spent five years with the "Latics", being voted the club's Player of the Year in 1992–93, before making a £87,500 move to Port Vale in July 1993. He spent the next eight years at Vale Park, helping the club to win promotion out of the Third Division in 1993–94 and to reach the final of the Football League Trophy in 2001. He retired from the professional game after helping Mansfield Town to win promotion out of the Third Division in 2001–02.

== Career ==
=== Southampton ===
Tankard started his football career with Southampton, signing Youth Training Scheme forms in June 1985. He played in pre-season friendly games two months after his 16th birthday. He won caps for the England under-17 team. He made his competitive debut for Southampton against Sheffield Wednesday in April 1986. However, he struggled with his weight. After only five appearances, it was apparent he had no future at The Dell, so he signed with Wigan Athletic in July 1988.

=== Wigan Athletic ===
The "Latics" finished 17th in the Third Division in 1988–89 under Ray Mathias's stewardship, just four places and two points above relegated Southend United. They dropped to 18th in 1989–90 under new boss Bryan Hamilton, three places and three points ahead of relegated Cardiff City. Wigan then rose to tenth in 1990–91, three places outside of the play-offs. They then dropped to 15th in 1991–92, before suffering relegation with a 23rd-place finish in 1992–93; it would prove to be his last season at Springfield Park, and Tankard departed after being voted as the club's Player of the Year.

=== Port Vale ===
In July 1993, John Rudge signed Tankard to Port Vale for a £87,500 fee. Initially unpopular with the fans, he turned things around at Vale Park after a last minute FA Cup winner against Huddersfield Town in the FA Cup second round. He spent December to April of the 1993–94 season on the sidelines due to a hamstring injury, with Dean Stokes playing in his stead, but Tankard's performances whilst fit helped the club to promotion out of the Third Division. He played regular football in the 1994–95 season, helping the club to avoid relegation out of the (newly re-branded) First Division by a ten-point margin. He was again a regular in the 1995–96 campaign until he was sidelined again in March due to another hamstring injury.

Following his recovery, he played 44 games of the 1996–97 season, one of the most successful of the club's history, as Vale posted an eighth-place finish, two places and four points below Crystal Palace, who went on to win promotion to the Premier League as winners of the play-offs. He made 42 appearances in the 1997–98 season, helping the "Valiants" to avoid the drop by finishing three places and just one point above relegated Manchester City. However, his reputation was somewhat sullied in an FA Cup third-round game on 14 January 1998, as he blasted his penalty over the bar in the penalty shoot-out with Arsenal; it was the final kick of the 4–3 defeat (the game had finished 1–1 in normal time). Recovering from their lacklustre third round performance, Arsenal would later go on to win the competition.

In 1998–99, Tankard was the only outfield player to hit the 40-game mark for the Vale, and also netted goals against Watford, Crystal Palace, Norwich City, and Oxford United. The club went on to avoid relegation only because they had scored more goals than Bury. However, relegation came in the 1999–2000 season under new manager Brian Horton; Tankard played 37 games, scoring in a 3–2 win over Sheffield United at Bramall Lane. He remained loyal to the Burslem club despite their fall into the Second Division and played 39 games in the 2000–01 season, scoring a personal best of five goals. He also played every game of Vale's run to the final of the Football League Trophy; however, he was an unused substitute for the final itself at the Millennium Stadium, which Vale won with a 2–1 victory over Brentford. Tankard was released in June 2001 after the club reneged on the offer of a new two-year contract upon bringing in Phil Hardy, Alex Gibson and Rae Ingram. In all he had made 324 first-team appearances for Port Vale, scoring 13 goals. One of the club's most consistent performers, years later, the club were still trying to fill the void Tankard's departure had left in the left-back role. In May 2019, he was voted into the "Ultimate Port Vale XI" by members of the OneValeFan supporter website. In December 2025, supporters voted him onto the all-time Port Vale XI on the club's official website.

=== Later career ===
He spent the 2001–02 season with Mansfield Town, helping Bill Dearden's "Stags" to gain the third and final automatic promotion place of the Third Division, one point ahead of Cheltenham Town. He was contracted with the club for the 2002–03 season, but did not make any appearances at Field Mill due to injury and was released in January 2003. He then had brief spells with Southern League clubs Hednesford Town and Stafford Rangers, where his injury problems continued.

== Personal and later life ==
After retiring from the game, Tankard worked at a minibus and coach hire company in Stone, Staffordshire. His daughter, Eva, played for Port Vale Women.

== Career statistics ==
Appearances and goals by club, season and competition
Club	Season	League			FA Cup		Other		Total	
Club	Season	Division	Apps	Goals	Apps	Goals	Apps	Goals	Apps	Goals
Southampton	1985–86	First Division	3	0	0	0	0	0	3	0
Southampton	1986–87	First Division	2	0	0	0	2	0	4	0
Southampton	Total		5	0	0	0	2	0	7	0
Wigan Athletic	1988–89	Third Division	33	1	0	0	4	0	37	1
Wigan Athletic	1989–90	Third Division	45	1	3	0	8	0	56	1
Wigan Athletic	1990–91	Third Division	46	1	4	0	7	0	57	1
Wigan Athletic	1991–92	Third Division	44	0	3	0	5	0	52	0
Wigan Athletic	1992–93	Third Division	41	1	3	0	11	1	55	2
Wigan Athletic	Total		209	4	13	0	35	1	257	5
Port Vale	1993–94	Second Division	26	0	2	1	5	0	33	1
Port Vale	1994–95	First Division	39	1	2	0	4	0	45	1
Port Vale	1995–96	First Division	29	0	6	0	8	0	43	0
Port Vale	1996–97	First Division	37	1	1	0	6	0	44	1
Port Vale	1997–98	First Division	39	0	2	0	2	0	43	0
Port Vale	1998–99	First Division	37	4	1	0	2	0	40	4
Port Vale	1999–2000	First Division	35	1	1	0	1	0	37	1
Port Vale	2000–01	First Division	33	4	1	0	5	1	39	5
Port Vale	Total		275	11	16	1	33	1	324	13
Mansfield Town	2001–02	Third Division	30	2	3	0	2	0	35	2
Hednesford Town	2003–04	Southern League; Premier Division	1	0	0	0	0	0	1	0
Career total			520	17	32	1	72	2	624	20

== Honours ==
Port Vale

- Football League Third Division second-place promotion: 1993–94
- Anglo-Italian Cup runner-up: 1995–96
- Football League Trophy: 2000–01

Mansfield Town

- Football League Third Division third-place promotion: 2001–02

Individual

- Wigan Athletic Player of the Year: 1992–93
