= Michael Walsh (footballer, born 1977) =

English footballer

Personal information
- Full name: Michael Shane Walsh
- Date of birth: 5 August 1977 (age 49)
- Place of birth: Rotherham, England
- Height: 6 ft 0 in (1.83 m)
- Position: Defender

Youth career
- Rotherham United

Senior career*
Years	Team	Apps	(Gls)
1995–1998	Scunthorpe United	104	(1)
1998–2007	Port Vale	173	(4)
2007	Alsager Town		
Total		277	(5)
- * Club domestic league appearances and goals

Michael Shane Walsh (born 5 August 1977) is an English former footballer who spent twelve years as a professional in the Football League. A defender, he made a total of 319 appearances in league and cup competitions.

Beginning his career at Scunthorpe United in 1995, he made over 100 appearances for the club before moving to Port Vale in 1998 for a £100,000 fee. With Vale, he won the Football League Trophy in 2001. He then suffered a catalogue of injuries that ended his career prematurely and severely limited his first-team appearances. He retired due to injury in 2007 at 29 and took up work as a gas fitter.

== Career ==
=== Scunthorpe United ===
Walsh was with Rotherham United as a schoolboy, though he started his professional career at Scunthorpe United in 1995, making his league debut under Dave Moore as a 17-year-old against Scarborough in April of that year. He spent three years with the club, playing across the back four, making 124 appearances in all competitions. The Glanford Park club came close to reaching the Third Division play-offs under Brian Laws in 1997–98, but finished one point and one place behind seventh place Barnet. He was linked with Preston North End, though a £500,000 transfer deal was called off after Preston entered financial difficulties.

=== Port Vale ===
Walsh signed for John Rudge's Port Vale on a Bosman transfer in June 1998, with the tribunal setting a fee of £100,000 plus £75,000 in appearance-based clauses. He played 19 First Division games in 1998–99 and featured just 14 times in 1999–2000, blaming the back pains which restricted his playing time on his long commute to Vale Park. His contribution to the 1999–2000 season was ended in early October by cruciate ligament and cartilage problems sustained from a tackle by Swindon Town left-back Sol Davis. He later said the injury badly weakened the right side of his body and that he never really fully recovered from it. In his absence, the club were relegated to the Second Division in manager Brian Horton's first full season in charge.

Walsh made 47 appearances in 2000–01, and went on to receive his only honour at the club in 2001, as he helped Vale to beat Brentford 2–1 in the Football League Trophy final at the Millennium Stadium. However, his injury saga began not long after signing a new contract in 2001 when Walsh underwent surgery, but by the end of the year he seemed to have recovered. However, by June 2003 another operation was needed to correct a shoulder injury. After this latest procedure he picked up an abdominal strain, though he again slowly began to recover. By November of that year he was injured again, this time because of his back, he required a series of injections and again consulted a surgeon. By February 2004 he was on the road to recovery, but the next month picked up a neck injury in a collision with Barnsley's Chris Shuker, meaning another operation. He recovered by October 2004 and ended the 2004–05 season with 25 appearances.

Despite Walsh missing most of the 2005–06 season due to a back injury, new boss Martin Foyle offered him a fresh contract in May 2006. This was on the belief that Walsh would play at least 30 games the following season. In May 2007, following a season of twenty appearances, he was informed that he would not be offered a contract for the forthcoming season. This was despite the player being desperate to reach the ten-year mark with the club to claim a testimonial match, insisting "[Vale] could not get a Sunday league player for what I was asking." He retired from the professional game at the age of 29, and later turned out for local Northern Premier League Division One South side Alsager Town.

== Style of play ==
Walsh was a central defender with pace, as well as excellent positional, heading and ball control skills; however, he was also extremely injury prone. He was referred to by one analyst as "the lower leagues' Ledley King". He was also an excellent throw-in taker.

== Post-retirement ==
After leaving the game he became a CORGI registered gas fitter at Burslem-based BGC.

== Career statistics ==
Appearances and goals by club, season and competition
Club	Season	League			FA Cup		League Cup		Other		Total	
Club	Season	Division	Apps	Goals	Apps	Goals	Apps	Goals	Apps	Goals	Apps	Goals
Scunthorpe United	1994–95	Third Division	1	0	4	0	0	0	0	0	5	0
Scunthorpe United	1995–96	Third Division	30	0	3	0	2	0	2 (Note: Appearance(s) in the EFL Trophy.)	0	37	0
Scunthorpe United	1996–97	Third Division	34	0	0	0	0	0	0	0	34	0
Scunthorpe United	1997–98	Third Division	39	1	4	0	2	0	3	0	48	1
Scunthorpe United	Total		104	1	11	0	4	0	5	0	124	1
Port Vale	1998–99	First Division	19	1	1	0	2	0	—		22	1
Port Vale	1999–2000	First Division	12	1	0	0	2	0	—		14	1
Port Vale	2000–01	Second Division	39	1	1	0	0	0	7	0	47	1
Port Vale	2001–02	Second Division	28	0	0	0	1	0	0	0	29	0
Port Vale	2002–03	Second Division	17	1	0	0	1	0	0	0	18	1
Port Vale	2003–04	Second Division	13	0	0	0	1	0	0	0	14	0
Port Vale	2004–05	League One	23	0	2	0	0	0	0	0	25	0
Port Vale	2005–06	League One	4	0	0	0	0	0	0	0	4	0
Port Vale	2006–07	League One	18	0	0	0	1	0	1	0	20	0
Port Vale	Total		173	4	4	0	8	0	8	0	193	4
Career total			277	5	15	0	12	0	13	0	317	5

== Honours ==
Port Vale

- Football League Trophy: 2000–01
