= William Burns (referee) =

English football referee

William "Bill" Burns
- Born: 16 December 1952; Scarborough, England
- Died: 23 August 2019; Scarborough, England

Domestic
Years	League	Role
1985–1988	Football League	Asst. referee
1988–2001	Football League	Referee

William Burns (Born December 1952 – 23 August 2019), usually known as "Bill Burns", was an English football referee who officiated in the Football League.

Born in Scarborough, Burns refereed the 1996 Football League Third Division play-off final, and the 2001 Football League Trophy Final. Having officiated since 1985, he retired as a Football League referee at the end of the 2000–01 season, at the age of 48. In 2002, he bought a pub in Scarborough with his wife, Jenny. In later life, he underwent a successful double liver transplant at St James's University Hospital in Leeds.

He died on 23 August 2019 aged 66 after a long battle with primary sclerosing cholangitis.
