= 2002–03 Hull City A.F.C. season =

English football club season

Hull City
2002–03 season
- Chairman: Adam Pearson
- Manager: Jan Mølby (until October); Billy Russell (caretaker); Peter Taylor
- Stadium: Boothferry Park (until December 2002); KC Stadium (from December 2002)
- Football League Third Division: 13th
- FA Cup: First round
- League Cup: First round
- League Trophy: First round
Home colours	Away colours

The 2002–03 season saw Hull City compete in the Football League Third Division where they finished in 13th position with 59 points. It was also Hull's final season at Boothferry Park as they moved to the KC Stadium in December 2002.

== Final league table ==
Pos	Team	Pld	W	D	L	GF	GA	GD	Pts
11	Kidderminster Harriers	46	16	15	15	62	63	−1	63
12	Cambridge United	46	16	13	17	67	70	−3	61
13	Hull City	46	14	17	15	58	53	+5	59
14	Darlington	46	12	18	16	58	59	−1	54
15	Boston United	46	15	13	18	55	56	−1	54 (Note: Boston United had 4 points deducted for financial irregularities.)

Rules for classification: In the Football League goals scored (GF) takes precedence over goal difference (GD).

== Results ==
Hull City's score comes first

=== Legend ===
Win	Draw	Loss

=== Football League Third Division ===
Match	Date	Opponent	Venue	Result	Attendance	Scorers
1	10 August 2002	Southend United	H	2–2	10,446	Green, Elliott
2	13 August 2002	Bristol Rovers	A	1–1	7,501	Johnson
3	17 August 2002	Exeter City	A	1–3	4,257	Green
4	24 August 2002	Bury	H	1–1	8,804	Johnson
5	26 August 2002	Hartlepool United	A	0–2	4,236	
6	31 August 2002	Leyton Orient	H	1–1	7,684	Keates
7	7 September 2002	Cambridge United	A	2–1	4,258	Whittle, Smith
8	14 September 2002	Carlisle United	H	4–0	8,461	Alexander (3), Dudfield
9	17 September 2002	Macclesfield Town	H	1–3	8,703	Green
10	21 September 2002	Oxford United	A	0–0	5,445	
11	28 September 2002	Swansea City	H	1–1	8,070	Jevons
12	5 October 2002	Kidderminster Harriers	A	0–1	3,787	
13	12 October 2002	Rochdale	H	3–0	9,057	Jevons, Branch (2)
14	19 October 2002	Torquay United	A	4–1	3,607	Jevons, Ashbee, Anderson, Green
15	26 October 2002	Rushden & Diamonds	H	1–1	10,695	Green
16	29 October 2002	Shrewsbury Town	A	1–1	3,089	Elliott
17	2 November 2002	Scunthorpe United	H	2–0	11,885	Branch, Alexander
18	9 November 2002	Lincoln City	A	1–1	6,271	Alexander
19	23 November 2002	Boston United	H	1–0	9,460	Delaney
20	30 November 2002	Wrexham	A	0–0	4,412	
21	14 December 2002	Darlington	H	0–1	14,162	
22	21 December 2002	Bournemouth	A	0–0	6,098	
23	26 December 2002	Hartlepool United	H	2–0	22,319	Green, Keates
24	28 December 2002	York City	A	1–1	7,856	Keates
25	1 January 2003	Bury	A	0–1	4,290	
26	4 January 2003	Bristol Rovers	H	1–0	14,913	Alexander
27	11 January 2003	Exeter City	H	2–2	13,667	Elliott (2)
28	18 January 2003	Leyton Orient	A	0–2	5,125	
29	25 January 2003	York City	H	0–0	18,437	
30	1 February 2003	Southend United	A	0–3	4,537	
31	8 February 2003	Lincoln City	H	0–1	13,728	
32	15 February 2003	Scunthorpe United	A	1–3	6,284	Forrester
33	22 February 2003	Cambridge United	H	1–1	15,607	Forrester
34	1 March 2003	Carlisle United	A	5–1	4,678	Walters (2), Elliott (2), Forrester
35	4 March 2003	Macclesfield Town	A	1–0	2,229	Elliott
36	8 March 2003	Oxford United	H	0–0	17,404	
37	15 March 2003	Rushden & Diamonds	A	2–4	4,713	Walters, Otsemobor
38	18 March 2003	Torquay United	H	1–1	13,310	Elliott
39	22 March 2003	Shrewsbury Town	H	2–0	13,253	Otsemobor, Keates
40	5 April 2003	Wrexham	H	1–2	15,002	Otsemobor
41	12 April 2003	Boston United	A	1–0	3,782	Elliott
42	19 April 2003	Bournemouth	H	3–1	15,816	Elliott (2), Walters
43	21 April 2003	Darlington	A	0–2	3,487	
44	26 April 2003	Kidderminster Harriers	H	4–1	14,544	Burgess (3), Walters
45	29 April 2003	Rochdale	A	1–2	2,225	Burgess
46	3 May 2003	Swansea City	A	2–4	9,585	Elliott, Reeves

=== FA Cup ===
Match	Date	Opponent	Venue	Result	Attendance	Scorers
R1	16 November 2002	Macclesfield Town	H	0–3	7,803	

=== Football League Cup ===
Match	Date	Opponent	Venue	Result	Attendance	Scorers
R1	10 September 2002	Leicester City	H	2–4	7,061	Alexander, Ashbee

=== Football League Trophy ===
Match	Date	Opponent	Venue	Result	Attendance	Scorers
R1	22 October 2002	Port Vale	A	1–3	2,621	Donaldson

== Squad statistics ==
No.	Pos.	Name	League		FA Cup		League Cup		Other		Total	
No.	Pos.	Name	Apps	Goals	Apps	Goals	Apps	Goals	Apps	Goals	Apps	Goals
1	GK	(Northern Ireland) Alan Fettis	17	0	0	0	0	0	0	0	17	0
1	GK	(England) Matt Glennon	9	0	0	0	1	0	0	0	10	0
2	DF	(England) Mike Edwards	3(3)	0	0	0	0	0	0	0	3(3)	0
3	DF	(England) Shaun Smith	17(5)	1	0(1)	0	1	0	0	0	18(6)	1
4	DF	(England) Ian Ashbee	31	1	1	0	1	1	0	0	32	2
5	DF	(Scotland) John Anderson	42(1)	1	1	0	1	0	0	0	44(1)	1
6	DF	(England) Greg Strong	3	0	0	0	0	0	0	0	3	0
7	MF	(Northern Ireland) Stuart Elliott	30(6)	12	0(1)	0	0	0	0	0	30(7)	12
8	FW	(England) Lawrie Dudfield	7(14)	1	0	0	0	0	0	0	7(14)	1
9	FW	(Republic of Ireland) Jonathan Walters	11	5	0	0	0	0	0	0	11	5
9	FW	(England) Gary Alexander	21(4)	6	1	0	1	1	1	0	24(4)	7
10	MF	(England) Stuart Green	27(1)	6	1	0	0	0	0	0	28(1)	6
11	MF	(England) Richard Appleby	6	0	0	0	1	0	0	0	7	0
12	DF	(England) Ben Petty	2	0	0	0	0	0	0	0	2	0
13	DF	(Wales) Michael Price	1(2)	0	0	0	0(1)	0	1	0	2(2)	0
14	GK	(England) Paul Musselwhite	20	0	1	0	0	0	1	0	22	0
15	DF	(England) Justin Whittle	34(5)	1	1	0	1	0	0	0	36(5)	1
16	MF	(England) Lee Philpott	0(1)	0	0	0	0	0	1	0	1(1)	0
17	MF	(England) Steve Melton	19(6)	0	0	0	0	0	0	0	19(6)	0
17	DF	(England) Neil Mann	0	0	0	0	0	0	0	0	0	0
18	MF	(England) Martin Reeves	5(3)	1	0	0	0	0	0	0	5(3)	1
18	MF	(England) Scott Kerr	0	0	0	0	0	0	1	0	1	0
19	FW	(England) Jamie Forrester	11	3	0	0	0	0	0	0	11	3
19	DF	(England) Matthew Bloomer	0	0	0	0	0	0	0	0	0	0
20	MF	(England) Ryan Williams	14(9)	0	1	0	1	0	1	0	17(9)	0
21	DF	(England) Nathan Peat	0(1)	0	0(1)	0	0	0	1	0	1(2)	0
22	DF	(England) Jon Otsemobor	8(1)	3	0	0	0	0	0	0	8(1)	3
22	FW	(England) Gary Bradshaw	2(3)	0	0	0	0	0	1	0	3(3)	0
23	FW	(England) Phil Jevons	13(11)	3	1	0	1	0	0	0	15(11)	3
23	DF	(England) Mark Greaves	3	0	0	0	0	0	0	0	3	0
24	DF	(England) Andy Holt	5(1)	0	0	0	0	0	0	0	5(1)	0
25	DF	(England) Daniel Webb	4(8)	0	0	0	0	0	0	0	4(8)	0
25	DF	(England) Nicky Mohan	0	0	0	0	0	0	0	0	0	0
25	FW	(Northern Ireland) Owen Morrison	1(1)	0	0	0	0	0	0	0	1(1)	0
25	FW	(England) Michael Branch	6(1)	3	0	0	0	0	0	0	6(1)	3
26	DF	(England) Steve Burton	2(9)	0	1	0	0	0	1	0	4(9)	0
27	FW	(Republic of Ireland) Ben Burgess	7	4	0	0	0	0	0	0	7	4
27	DF	(England) Matt Wicks	0	0	0	0	0	0	0	0	0	0
28	DF	(Republic of Ireland) Damien Delaney	30	1	1	0	0	0	0	0	31	1
28	MF	(England) Simon Johnson	4(8)	2	0	0	0(1)	0	0	0	5(8)	2
29	DF	(England) Carl Regan	33(5)	1	0	1	0	0	0	0	35(5)	1
30	MF	(England) Dean Keates	36	4	0	0	1	0	0	0	37	4
33	FW	(England) Clayton Donaldson	0(2)	0	0	0	0	0	0(1)	1	0(3)	1
35	MF	(England) Simon Russell	0(1)	0	0	0	0	0	0(1)	0	0(2)	0
36	MF	(England) Russell Fry	0	0	0	0	0	0	0(1)	0	0(1)	0
39	DF	(Antigua and Barbuda) Marc Joseph	22(1)	0	0	0	0	0	0	0	22(1)	0
