= 2001–02 Hull City A.F.C. season =

English football club season

Hull City
2001–02 season
- Chairman: Adam Pearson
- Manager: Brian Little (until 27 February); Billy Russell (interim, 27 February–4 April); Jan Mølby (from 4 April)
- Stadium: Boothferry Park
- Third Division: 11th
- FA Cup: Second round
- League Cup: Second round
- League Trophy: Area semi-finals
- Top goalscorer: League: Gary Alexander (17); All: Gary Alexander (23)
- Highest home attendance: 12,529 (v Scunthorpe United, 9 March, Third Division)
- Lowest home attendance: 5,226 (v Leigh RMI, 30 October, League Trophy)
- Average home league attendance: 9,505
- Biggest win: 4–0 (v York City, 8 September); 5–1 (v Cheltenham Town, 3 November)
- Biggest defeat: 4–0 (v Hartlepool United, 6 November); 4–0 (v Luton Town, 6 April)
Home colours	Away colours

The 2001–02 season was the 98th season in the history of Hull City Association Football Club and their sixth consecutive season in the Third Division. In addition to the domestic league, the club would also participate in the FA Cup, the League Cup, and the League Trophy.

== Competitions ==
=== Third Division ===
==== League table ====
Pos	Team	Pld	W	D	L	GF	GA	GD	Pts
9	Shrewsbury Town	46	20	10	16	64	53	+11	70
10	Kidderminster Harriers	46	19	9	18	56	47	+9	66
11	Hull City	46	16	13	17	57	51	+6	61
12	Southend United	46	15	13	18	51	54	−3	58
13	Macclesfield Town	46	15	13	18	41	52	−11	58

Rules for classification: 1) Points; 2) Goal difference; 3) Goals scored

==== Results summary ====
Overall								Home						Away					
Pld	W	D	L	GF	GA	GD	Pts	W	D	L	GF	GA	GD	W	D	L	GF	GA	GD
46	16	13	17	57	51	+6	61	12	6	5	38	18	+20	4	7	12	19	33	−14

Source: Soccerbase

==== Matches ====
Win Draw Loss

11 August 2001 1	Exeter City	1–3	Hull City	Exeter
	Campbell 22'; Kerr (yellow card) 37'		Johnsson (yellow card) 22'; Whitmore 33'; Greaves 57', (yellow card) 87'; Dudfield 85'	Stadium: St James Park; Attendance: 4,677; Referee: Anthony Bates

18 August 2001 2	Hull City	0–0	Plymouth Argyle	Hull
				Stadium: Boothferry Park; Attendance: 10,755; Referee: George Cain

25 August 2001 3	Carlisle United	0–0	Hull City	Carlisle
	Elliott (yellow card) 69'; Haddow (yellow card) 83'; Birch (yellow card) 88'		Whittle (yellow card) 8'; Greaves (yellow card) 57'; Beresford (yellow card) 88'	Stadium: Brunton Park; Attendance: 3,695; Referee: Frazer Stretton

27 August 2001 4	Hull City	2–1	Kidderminster Harriers	Hull
	Alexander 52', 90', (yellow card) 81'; Greaves (yellow card) 70'; Whittle (red card) 80'		Broughton (yellow card) 15'; Williams (yellow card) 45'; Bird (yellow card) 77', (goal) 81' (pen.)	Stadium: Boothferry Park; Attendance: 8,835; Referee: Scott Mathieson

8 September 2001 5	Hull City	4–0	York City	Hull
	Mohan 23'; Alexander (yellow card) 24', (goal) 73'; Dudfield 61' (pen.); Lee 90'			Stadium: Boothferry Park; Attendance: 9,737; Referee: Phil Richards

15 September 2001 6	Macclesfield Town	0–0	Hull City	Macclesfield
			Edwards (yellow card) 9'; Alexander (yellow card) 35'	Stadium: Moss Rose; Attendance: 2,740; Referee: John Brandwood

18 September 2001 7	Hull City	3–1	Rochdale	Hull
	Alexander 28', 51'; Dudfield 63'; Edwards (yellow card) 84'; Whitmore (red card) 90'		Townson 30', (yellow card) 90'	Stadium: Boothferry Park; Attendance: 10,213; Referee: Mark Clattenburg

22 September 2001 8	Hull City	2–1	Swansea City	Hull
	Dudfield 34'; Johnsson 47', (yellow card) 76'; Alexander (yellow card) 68'		Phillips 68'; Roberts 72'; O'Leary (yellow card) 90'	Stadium: Boothferry Park; Attendance: 10,440; Referee: David Pugh

25 September 2001 9	Mansfield Town	4–2	Hull City	Mansfield
	Disley 34'; Hassell 35'; Reddington 40'; Greenacre 58'		Alexander 56'; Reddy 85'	Stadium: Field Mill; Attendance: 5,702; Referee: Joe Ross

29 September 2001 10	Hull City	3–0	Halifax Town	Hull
	Dudfield 23'; Reddy 73', 85'		Harsley (yellow card) 26'	Stadium: Boothferry Park; Attendance: 9,572; Referee: Paul Alcock

5 October 2001 11	Shrewsbury Town	1–1	Hull City	Shrewsbury
	Rodgers 16'		Mohan (yellow card) 32'; Alexander 90'	Stadium: Gay Meadow; Attendance: 5,010; Referee: Tony Leake

13 October 2001 12	Hull City	1–0	Torquay United	Hull
	Reddy 75'		Brabin (yellow card) 56', (red card) 90'	Stadium: Boothferry Park; Attendance: 9,102; Referee: Graham Salisbury

20 October 2001 13	Rushden & Diamonds	3–3	Hull City	Irthlingborough
	Edwards 9' (o.g.); Burgess 19', 26'; Hunter (yellow card) 61'; Hanlon (yellow card) 66'		Alexander 5'; Whittle (yellow card) 46'; Hunter 47' (o.g.); Rowe 54'	Stadium: Nene Park; Attendance: 4,676; Referee: Howard Webb

23 October 2001 14	Hull City	1–1	Leyton Orient	Hull
	Alexander 77', (yellow card) 80'		Whittle 90' (o.g.)	Stadium: Boothferry Park; Attendance: 9,843; Referee: Alan Butler

27 October 2001 15	Darlington	0–1	Hull City	Darlington
	Brumwell (yellow card) 45'; Jeannin (yellow card) 80'		Whittle (yellow card) 2'; Rowe (yellow card) 38'; Alexander 44', (yellow card) 44'; Beresford (red card) 45'	Stadium: Feethams; Attendance: 5,163; Referee: Mike Jones

3 November 2001 16	Hull City	5–1	Cheltenham Town	Hull
	Banks 2' (o.g.); Mohan (yellow card) 21'; Dudfield 22'; Alexander 26'; Whitmore 78'; Beresford 81'		Howarth (yellow card) 36'; Alsop 69'	Stadium: Boothferry Park; Attendance: 9,435; Referee: Mark Cowburn

6 November 2001 17	Hartlepool United	4–0	Hull City	Hartlepool
	Watson 33', 40', 90'; Clarke (yellow card) 38'; Barron 84'		Mohan (yellow card) 80'; Goodison (yellow card) 90'	Stadium: Victoria Park; Attendance: 3,183; Referee: Peter Jones

10 November 2001 18	Lincoln City	2–1	Hull City	Lincoln
	Cameron 30'; Battersby 64'		Goodison (yellow card) 16'; Whittle (yellow card) 33'; Petty (yellow card) 69'; Alexander 90'	Stadium: Sincil Bank; Attendance: 4,950; Referee: Eddie Wolstenholme

20 November 2001 19	Luton Town	0–1	Hull City	Luton
	Brković (yellow card) 24'; Hillier (yellow card) 36'		Alexander (yellow card) 38'; Edwards (yellow card) 46'; Matthews 51'; Williams (yellow card) 72'	Stadium: Kenilworth Road; Attendance: 7,214; Referee: David Elleray

24 November 2001 20	Hull City	0–0	Bristol Rovers	Hull
	Edwards (yellow card) 66'		Ommel (yellow card) 52'; Hillier (yellow card) 67'; Walters (yellow card) 90'	Stadium: Boothferry Park; Attendance: 9,680; Referee: Colin Webster

1 December 2001 21	Hull City	3–0	Oxford United	Hull
	Matthews 13'; Dudfield 19'; Alexander 38'		Savage (yellow card) 3'; Whitehead (yellow card) 50'; Bolland (yellow card) 72'; Hatswell (yellow card) 83'	Stadium: Boothferry Park; Attendance: 9,552; Referee: Roy Pearson

15 December 2001 22	Scunthorpe United	2–1	Hull City	Scunthorpe
	Hodges 2'; Torpey 53'		Edwards (red card) 59'; Dudfield 65'	Stadium: Glanford Park; Attendance: 6,479; Referee: David Crick

21 December 2001 23	Hull City	0–0	Southend United	Hull
			Rawle (yellow card) 52'	Stadium: Boothferry Park; Attendance: 8,678; Referee: Phil Joslin

29 December 2001 24	Kidderminster Harriers	3–0	Hull City	Kidderminster
	Henriksen 25'; Blake (yellow card) 47'; Larkin 48'; Hinton (yellow card) 55'; Bennett 68'		Alexander (yellow card) 28'; Greaves (yellow card) 39'	Stadium: Aggborough; Attendance: 3,962; Referee: Bill Jordan

12 January 2002 25	Plymouth Argyle	1–0	Hull City	Plymouth
	Stonebridge 20'		Whittle (yellow card) 27'; Alexander (yellow card) 64'	Stadium: Home Park; Attendance: 9,134; Referee: Clive Wilkes

15 January 2002 26	Hull City	0–1	Carlisle United	Hull
	Edwards (yellow card) 49'		Foran 9', (yellow card) 37'; Murphy (yellow card) 28'	Stadium: Boothferry Park; Attendance: 8,526; Referee: Graham Frankland

19 January 2002 27	Hull City	2–0	Exeter City	Hull
	Johnsson 26'; Alexander 67'		Cronin (yellow card) 45'; Curran (yellow card) 79'	Stadium: Boothferry Park; Attendance: 8,459; Referee: Tony Leake

22 January 2002 28	Southend United	2–0	Hull City	Southend
	Rawle 36'; Hutchings 71' (pen.)		Johnsson (yellow card) 4'; Beresford (yellow card) 73'	Stadium: Roots Hall; Attendance: 3,341; Referee: Ray Oliver

26 January 2002 29	Hull City	3–0	Shrewsbury Town	Hull
	Williams 19' (pen.); Sneekes (yellow card) 24'; Dudfield 29'; Edwards 32'		Tolley (yellow card) 90'	Stadium: Boothferry Park; Attendance: 8,534; Referee: Peter Jones

29 January 2002 30	York City	2–1	Hull City	York
	Proctor 14'; Duffield 16'		Rowe 72' (pen.)	Stadium: Bootham Crescent; Attendance: 6,495; Referee: Paul Rejer

2 February 2002 31	Halifax Town	0–1	Hull City	Halifax
	Woodward (yellow card) 80'		Williams (yellow card) 10'; Johnsson 38'; Holt (yellow card) 53'	Stadium: The Shay; Attendance: 3,400; Referee: Andy Hall

5 February 2002 32	Hull City	1–1	Hartlepool United	Hull
	Williams 6'		Boyd 90'	Stadium: Boothferry Park; Attendance: 8,419; Referee: Frazer Stretton

9 February 2002 33	Hull City	2–1	Rushden & Diamonds	Hull
	Alexander 12' van Blerk (yellow card) 58' (yellow-red card) 77', (goal) 70'; Williams (yellow card) 79'		Brady (yellow card) 61'; Hanlon 77' (pen.)	Stadium: Boothferry Park; Attendance: 8,825; Referee: Mark Cowburn

16 February 2002 34	Torquay United	1–1	Hull City	Torquay
	Rees (yellow card) 30'; Woods 61', (yellow card) 64'; Brandon (yellow card) 83'		van Blerk (yellow card) 18'; Alexander 30'; Matthews (yellow card) 48'; Sneekes (yellow card) 79'	Stadium: Plainmoor; Attendance: 2,403; Referee: Steve Tomlin

22 February 2002 35	Hull City	0–1	Macclesfield Town	Hull
	Williams (red card) 63'; Musselwhite (yellow card) 76'; Alexander (yellow card) 80'		Whitaker (yellow card) 29'; Lambert 50'; O'Neill (yellow card) 89'	Stadium: Boothferry Park; Attendance: 8,431; Referee: Mike Ryan

1 March 2002 36	Swansea City	1–0	Hull City	Swansea
	Todd (yellow card) 20'; Watkin 86'		Sneekes (yellow card) 1'; Greaves (yellow card) 89'	Stadium: Vetch Field; Attendance: 5,006; Referee: Brian Curson

5 March 2002 37	Hull City	4–1	Mansfield Town	Hull
	Philpott 14'; Bradshaw 22'; Norris 49', (yellow card) 90'; Greaves (yellow card) 66'; Johnsson 78'		Williamson (yellow card) 66'; Bradley (yellow card) 68', (goal) 82'; Pemberton (yellow card) 73'; Murray (yellow card) 77'	Stadium: Boothferry Park; Attendance: 9,158; Referee: Mick Fletcher

9 March 2002 38	Hull City	0–1	Scunthorpe United	Hull
	Whittle (yellow card) 59'; Greaves (yellow card) 88'		McGibbon (yellow card) 33'; Sparrow (yellow card) 44'; Jackson 90'	Stadium: Boothferry Park; Attendance: 12,529; Referee: Roy Pearson

16 March 2002 39	Oxford United	1–0	Hull City	Oxford
	Brooks 82'		Alexander (yellow card) 41'	Stadium: Kassam Stadium; Attendance: 5,952; Referee: Paul Armstrong

23 March 2002 40	Leyton Orient	0–0	Hull City	Leyton
	Harris (yellow card) 18'; Minton (yellow card) 51'		van Blerk (yellow card) 17'; Williams (yellow card) 89'	Stadium: Brisbane Road; Attendance: 4,265; Referee: Clive Wilkes

30 March 2002 41	Hull City	1–2	Darlington	Hull
	Norris (yellow card) 58'; Alexander 68'		Conlon 17'; Heckingbottom (yellow card) 33'; Ford (yellow card) 55'; Clark 78'	Stadium: Boothferry Park; Attendance: 8,642; Referee: Roger Furnandiz

1 April 2002 42	Cheltenham Town	1–0	Hull City	Cheltenham
	Alsop (yellow card) 57'; Brough 71'		Musselwhite (yellow card) 30'; Sneekes (yellow card) 58'	Stadium: Whaddon Road; Attendance: 5,546; Referee: Lee Cable

6 April 2002 43	Hull City	0–4	Luton Town	Hull
	Sneekes (yellow card) 30'; Lightbourne (yellow card) 40'		Howard 23', 79', 89'; Crowe 38'; Boyce (yellow card) 68'	Stadium: Boothferry Park; Attendance: 9,379; Referee: Phil Dowd

9 April 2002 44	Rochdale	3–2	Hull City	Rochdale
	McEvilly (yellow card) 10'; Oliver 32'; McCourt 57'; Townson 64'		Holt (yellow card) 12'; Dudfield 26', 45'; Greaves (yellow card) 79'	Stadium: Spotland Stadium; Attendance: 3,433; Referee: Trevor Parkes

13 April 2002 45	Bristol Rovers	1–1	Hull City	Bristol
	Foster (yellow card) 60'; Foran 67'		Matthews 36'	Stadium: Memorial Stadium; Attendance: 6,340; Referee: Clive Penton

20 April 2002 46	Hull City	1–1	Lincoln City	Hull
	Dudfield 45'; Alexander (yellow card) 87'		Barnett 12'	Stadium: Boothferry Park; Attendance: 11,890; Referee: Mike Jones

=== FA Cup ===
==== Matches ====
Win Draw Loss

17 November 2001 First	Northwich Victoria	2–5	Hull City	Northwich
	Burke (yellow card) 6'; Blundell 73'; Mike 80'		Johnsson 13'; Matthews 39'; Dudfield 42'; Alexander 79'; Barnard 83' (o.g.)	Stadium: Drill Field; Attendance: 2,285; Referee: Tony Leake

8 December 2001 Second	Hull City	2–3	Oldham Athletic	Hull
	Dudfield 13'; Whittle (yellow card) 31'; Alexander 64', (yellow card) 65'; Johnsson (yellow card) 83'		Sheridan 32'; Tipton (yellow card) 47'; Eyres 48'; Duxbury 50'; Balmer (yellow card) 56'	Stadium: Boothferry Park; Attendance: 9,422; Referee: Mark Clattenburg

=== League Cup ===
==== Matches ====
Win Draw Loss

21 August 2001 First	Wrexham	2–3	Hull City	Wrexham
	Carey (yellow card) 40' (yellow-red card) 90'; Faulconbridge 71'; Russell 90'		Whitmore 24', (yellow card) 68'; Greaves 64'; Alexander 79'	Stadium: Racecourse Ground; Attendance: 1,761; Referee: Roger Furnandiz

12 September 2001 Second	Derby County	3–0	Hull City	Derby
	Mawéné (yellow card) 10'; Burton 45', 90'; Kinkladze 64'			Stadium: Pride Park; Attendance: 11,246; Referee: Graham Laws

=== League Trophy ===
Hull were given a bye for the first round of the League Trophy, and entered the competition at the second round stage, with a home tie against Leigh RMI on 30 October 2001.

==== Matches ====
Win Draw Loss

30 October 2001 Second	Hull City	3–0	Leigh RMI	Hull
	Alexander 11' (pen.), 63', 67'			Stadium: Boothferry Park; Attendance: 5,226; Referee: Brian Curson

4 December 2001 Quarter-finals	Hull City	2–1	Port Vale	Hull
	Whittle 26'; Whitmore 66'		McPhee 14'	Stadium: Boothferry Park; Attendance: 5,326; Referee: Steve Baines

8 January 2002 Area semi-finals	Hull City	0–1	Huddersfield Town	Hull
	Sneekes (yellow card) 49'		Booth 39'	Stadium: Boothferry Park; Attendance: 7,248; Referee: George Cain

== Squad ==
#	Name	Position	Nationality	Place of birth	Date of birth (age) (Note: Players' ages listed as they were on 1 July 2001, the official start date of the 2001–02 season)	Previous club	Date signed	Fee
Goalkeepers
1	Paul Musselwhite	GK	ENG	Portsmouth	22 December 1968 (age 32)	Sheffield Wednesday	19 September 2000	Free
14	Matt Glennon	GK	ENG	Stockport	8 October 1978 (age 22)	Bolton Wanderers	June 2001	£50,000
Defenders
2	Mike Edwards	DF	ENG	Hessle	25 April 1980 (age 21)	Academy	July 1996	–
3	Andy Holt	DF	ENG	Stockport	21 April 1978 (age 23)	Oldham Athletic	March 2001	£150,000
4	Justin Whittle	DF	ENG	Derby	18 March 1971 (age 30)	Stoke City	27 November 1998	£65,000
5	Mark Greaves	DF	ENG	Hull	22 January 1975 (age 26)	Brigg Town	17 June 1996	Unknown
6	Matt Wicks	DF	ENG	Reading	8 September 1978 (age 22)	Brighton & Hove Albion	11 January 2002	Swap deal
17	Neil Mann	DF	SCO	(England) Nottingham	19 November 1972 (age 28)	Grantham Town	July 1993	Free
19	Matt Bloomer	DF	ENG	Grimsby	3 November 1978 (age 22)	Grimsby Town	June 2001	Unknown
28	Nicky Mohan	DF	ENG	Middlesbrough	6 October 1970 (age 30)	Stoke City	July 2001	Unknown
29	Ben Petty	DF	ENG	Solihull	22 March 1977 (age 24)	Stoke City	July 2001	Unknown
Midfielders
7	Ryan Williams	MF	ENG	Sutton-in-Ashfield	31 August 1978 (age 22)	Chesterfield	19 June 2001	£160,000
15	Julian Johnsson	MF	FRO	Tórshavn	24 February 1975 (age 26)	(Norway) Sogndal	1 August 2001	£50,000
16	Lee Philpott	MF	ENG	Barnet	21 February 1970 (age 31)	Lincoln City	July 2000	Free
18	Scott Kerr	MF	ENG	Leeds	11 December 1981 (age 19)	Bradford City	19 June 2001	£15,000
21	Ben Morley	MF	ENG	Hull	22 December 1980 (age 20)	Academy	8 December 1997	–
23	Theodore Whitmore	MF	JAM	Montego Bay	5 August 1972 (age 28)	(Jamaica) Seba United	29 October 1999	Free
25	Richard Sneekes	MF	NED	Amsterdam	30 October 1968 (age 32)	Stockport County	November 2001	Free
26	Jason van Blerk	MF	AUS	Sydney	16 March 1968 (age 33)	Stockport County	January 2002	Loan
Forwards
8	Lawrie Dudfield	FW	ENG	Southwark	7 May 1980 (age 20)	Leicester City	22 June 2001	£250,000
9	Gary Alexander	FW	ENG	Lambeth	15 August 1979 (age 21)	Swindon Town	June 2001	Unknown
10	Rodney Rowe	FW	ENG	Huddersfield	30 July 1975 (age 25)	Gillingham	3 January 2001	Free
11	David Beresford	FW	ENG	Middleton	11 November 1976 (age 24)	Huddersfield Town	29 June 2001	Free
13	Adrián Cáceres	FW	ARG	Buenos Aires	10 January 1982 (age 19)	Southampton	March 2002	Unknown
20	Rob Matthews	FW	ENG	Slough	14 October 1970 (age 30)	Halifax Town	21 March 2001	Free
27	Gary Bradshaw	FW	ENG	Beverley	30 December 1982 (age 18)	Academy	March 2000	–
Out on loan
–	Michael Price	DF	WAL	Wrexham	29 April 1982 (age 19)	Everton	July 2001	Unknown

=== Left club during season ===
#	Name	Position	Nationality	Place of birth	Date of birth (age) (Note: Players' ages listed as they were on 1 July 2001, the official start date of the 2001–02 season)	Subsequent club	Date left	Fee
6	David Lee	MF	ENG	Basildon	28 March 1980 (age 21)	Brighton & Hove Albion	11 January 2002	Swap deal
12	Ian Goodison	DF	JAM	Montego Bay	21 November 1972 (age 28)	(Jamaica) Seba United	23 April 2002	Free
22	David Brown	FW	ENG	Bolton	2 October 1978 (age 22)	Torquay United	4 September 2001	Free
22	David Norris	MF	ENG	Stamford	20 February 1981 (age 20)	Bolton Wanderers	21 April 2002	End of loan
22	Neil Roberts	FW	WAL	Wrexham	7 April 1978 (age 23)	Wigan Athletic	February 2002	End of loan
24	John Eyre	FW	ENG	Hull	9 October 1974 (age 26)	Oldham Athletic	11 July 2001	Free
24	Kyle Lightbourne	FW	BER	Hamilton	29 September 1968 (age 32)	Macclesfield Town	21 April 2002	End of loan
25	Gary Brabin	MF	ENG	Liverpool	9 December 1970 (age 21)	Released	August 2001	Released
25	Michael Reddy	FW	IRL	Graiguenamanagh	24 March 1980 (age 21)	Sunderland	October 2001	End of loan
26	Caleb Folan	FW	IRL	(England) Leeds	26 October 1982 (age 18)	Leeds United	31 December 2001	End of loan
26	Paul Tait	FW	ENG	Newcastle	24 October 1974 (age 26)	Crewe Alexandra	November 2001	End of loan

== Appearances ==
Note: Appearances shown after a "+" indicate player came on during course of the match.

No.	Pos	Nat	Player	Total		Third Division		FA Cup		League Cup		League Trophy	
No.	Pos	Nat	Player	Apps	Goals	Apps	Goals	Apps	Goals	Apps	Goals	Apps	Goals
1	GK	(England) ENG	Paul Musselwhite	21	0	20+0	0	0+0	0	0+0	0	1+0	0
2	DF	(England) ENG	Mike Edwards	45	1	38+1	1	2+0	0	2+0	0	2+0	0
3	DF	(England) ENG	Andy Holt	34	0	24+6	0	0+0	0	1+0	0	2+1	0
4	DF	(England) ENG	Justin Whittle	41	1	35+1	0	2+0	0	1+0	0	2+0	1
5	DF	(England) ENG	Mark Greaves	28	1	25+1	0	0+0	0	1+0	1	0+1	0
6	DF	(England) ENG	David Lee	14	1	2+9	1	0+1	0	0+1	0	0+1	0
6	DF	(England) ENG	Matt Wicks	14	0	14+0	0	0+0	0	0+0	0	0+0	0
7	MF	(England) ENG	Ryan Williams	34	2	26+3	2	1+1	0	0+0	0	2+1	0
8	FW	(England) ENG	Lawrie Dudfield	45	14	32+6	12	2+0	2	2+0	0	3+0	0
9	FW	(England) ENG	Gary Alexander	50	23	43+0	17	2+0	2	2+0	1	3+0	3
10	FW	(England) ENG	Rodney Rowe	15	2	5+9	2	0+0	0	0+1	0	0+0	0
11	FW	(England) ENG	David Beresford	47	1	33+8	1	1+0	0	2+0	0	3+0	0
12	DF	(Jamaica) JAM	Ian Goodison	21	0	14+2	0	2+0	0	1+0	0	2+0	0
13	FW	(Argentina) ARG	Adrián Cáceres	4	0	1+3	0	0+0	0	0+0	0	0+0	0
13	DF	(Wales) WAL	Michael Price	3	0	0+1	0	0+0	0	0+1	0	0+1	0
14	GK	(England) ENG	Matt Glennon	32	0	26+0	0	2+0	0	2+0	0	2+0	0
15	MF	(Faroe Islands) FRO	Julian Johnsson	47	5	38+2	4	2+0	1	2+0	0	2+1	0
16	MF	(England) ENG	Lee Philpott	11	1	9+2	1	0+0	0	0+0	0	0+0	0
17	DF	(Scotland) SCO	Neil Mann	0	0	0+0	0	0+0	0	0+0	0	0+0	0
18	MF	(England) ENG	Scott Kerr	0	0	0+0	0	0+0	0	0+0	0	0+0	0
19	DF	(England) ENG	Matt Bloomer	4	0	0+3	0	0+0	0	1+0	0	0+0	0
20	FW	(England) ENG	Rob Matthews	21	3	9+6	3	2+1	0	0+1	0	1+1	0
21	DF	(England) ENG	Ben Morley	4	0	1+2	0	0+0	0	0+1	0	0+0	0
22	FW	(England) ENG	David Brown	0	0	0+0	0	0+0	0	0+0	0	0+0	0
22	MF	(England) ENG	David Norris	6	1	3+3	1	0+0	0	0+0	0	0+0	0
22	FW	(Wales) WAL	Neil Roberts	6	0	3+3	0	0+0	0	0+0	0	0+0	0
23	MF	(Jamaica) JAM	Theodore Whitmore	41	4	23+11	2	2+0	0	2+0	1	3+0	1
24	FW	(England) ENG	John Eyre	0	0	0+0	0	0+0	0	0+0	0	0+0	0
24	FW	(Bermuda) BER	Kyle Lightbourne	4	0	3+1	0	0+0	0	0+0	0	0+0	0
25	FW	(England) ENG	Gary Brabin	0	0	0+0	0	0+0	0	0+0	0	0+0	0
25	FW	(Republic of Ireland) IRL	Michael Reddy	5	4	1+4	4	0+0	0	0+0	0	0+0	0
25	MF	(Netherlands) NED	Richard Sneekes	25	0	17+5	0	0+1	0	0+0	0	1+1	0
26	FW	(Republic of Ireland) IRL	Caleb Folan	1	0	0+1	0	0+0	0	0+0	0	0+0	0
26	FW	(England) ENG	Paul Tait	2	0	0+2	0	0+0	0	0+0	0	0+0	0
26	MF	(Australia) AUS	Jason van Blerk	10	1	10+0	1	0+0	0	0+0	0	0+0	0
27	FW	(England) ENG	Gary Bradshaw	4	1	3+0	1	0+1	0	0+0	0	0+0	0
28	DF	(England) ENG	Nicky Mohan	30	1	26+1	1	0+0	0	2+0	0	1+0	0
29	DF	(England) ENG	Ben Petty	33	0	22+4	0	2+0	0	1+1	0	3+0	0

- Source: Hull City 2001–02 (use drop down list to select relevant season)
