= Steve Rimmer =

English footballer

Personal information
- Full name: Stephen Anthony Rimmer
- Date of birth: 23 May 1979 (age 47)
- Place of birth: Liverpool, England
- Height: 6 ft 3 in (1.91 m)
- Position: Defender

Youth career
- Manchester City

Senior career*
Years	Team	Apps	(Gls)
1995–1999	Manchester City	0	(0)
1999	→ Doncaster Rovers (loan)		
1999–2000	Port Vale	2	(0)
- Marine
2001	Hyde United	20	(0)
2001–2003	Marine		
- Skelmersdale United
- * Club domestic league appearances and goals

Stephen Anthony Rimmer (born 23 May 1979) is an English former footballer. His career in the English Football League was brief but eventful, playing in front of a record-low crowd at Maine Road and getting sent off 23 minutes into his Port Vale debut. In 2000, he ventured into non-League football, and turned out for Marine, Hyde United, and Skelmersdale United.

== Career ==
A product of the Manchester City youth system, he made one first-team appearance for the club on 8 December 1998. City lost 2–1 to Mansfield Town in the first round of the Football League Trophy. Rimmer picked up a booking in a match primarily remembered as having Manchester City's lowest ever recorded attendance (just 3,007 turned up). He spent January 1999 at Conference National side Doncaster Rovers. He left Maine Road at the end of the season and quickly signed up with First Division club Port Vale.

Handed his Vale debut by manager Brian Horton on 28 December 1999 at Oakwell, replacing Mark Snijders at half-time, he was sent off on 68 minutes for serious foul play. He only one more appearance, on 12 February 2000, replacing Stewart Talbot at Blundell Park after just 13 minutes. He was released at the end of the season.

He then went into non-League football with Marine and then joined Hyde United in January 2001. He made 21 appearances for Hyde in the second half of the 2000–01 season, scoring one goal against Gateshead at Ewen Fields. He returned to Marine in 2001, staying with the club for two years before joining Skelmersdale United.

== Post-retirement ==
After leaving the professional game, he began working as a PE teacher at Parklands High School in Chorley.

== Career statistics ==
Appearances and goals by club, season and competition
Club	Season	League			FA Cup		Other		Total	
Club	Season	Division	Apps	Goals	Apps	Goals	Apps	Goals	Apps	Goals
Manchester City	1998–99	Second Division	0	0	0	0	1	0	1	0
Port Vale	1999–2000	First Division	2	0	0	0	0	0	2	0
Hyde United	2000–01	Northern Premier League; Premier Division	20	0	0	0	1	0	21	0
