= 2003–04 Carlisle United F.C. season =

Carlisle United F.C.
2003–04 season
- Owner: John Courtenay
- Chairman: Andrew Jenkins
- Manager: Roddy Collins (until 29 August); Paul Simpson
- Stadium: Brunton Park
- Third Division: 23rd (relegated)
- FA Cup: First round
- League Cup: First round
- Football League Trophy: Quarter-finalists

For its 2003–04 season, Carlisle United F.C. competed in the English Football League Division Three. Carlisle United achieved a record of 12–9–15, the second-worst record in the third division. The club's 23rd-place finish in the division led to them being relegated to the Football Conference National for the 2004–05 season.

The team started the season being managed by Roddy Collins, but Collins was sacked after a four-game run of losses at the start of the season. player-manager Paul Simpson took over for the rest of the campaign.

== Players ==
=== First-team squad ===
Squad at end of season

Note: Flags indicate national team as defined under FIFA eligibility rules; some limited exceptions apply. Players may hold more than one non-FIFA nationality.

No.	Pos.	Nation	Player
1	GK	ENG	Matt Glennon
2	MF	ENG	Paul Arnison
3	DF	SCO	Tom Cowan
4	DF	ENG	Paul Raven
5	DF	IRL	Brian Shelley
6	DF	NIR	Darren Kelly
7	DF	IRL	Peter Murphy
8	MF	ENG	Chris Billy
9	FW	IRL	Richie Foran
10	FW	ENG	Peter Duffield
11	MF	ENG	Adam Rundle
12	DF	ENG	Lee Andrews
13	DF	IRL	Will McDonagh

No.	Pos.	Nation	Player
14	DF	ENG	Kevin Gray
17	MF	ENG	Mark Summerbell
18	DF	ENG	Kelvin Langmead (on loan from Preston North End)
19	FW	ENG	Craig Farrell
20	MF	IRL	Brendan McGill
21	FW	ENG	David Molloy
22	GK	ENG	Peter Keen
23	FW	ENG	Kevin Henderson
24	MF	ENG	Michael Jack
26	MF	ENG	Paul Simpson
28	MF	ENG	Paul Gardiner
29	MF	ENG	Mark Boyd
31	FW	ENG	Andy Preece

=== Left club during season ===
Note: Flags indicate national team as defined under FIFA eligibility rules; some limited exceptions apply. Players may hold more than one non-FIFA nationality.

No.	Pos.	Nation	Player
2	DF	ENG	Mark Birch (to Gretna)
3	DF	ENG	Lee Maddison (to Gretna)
3	DF	ENG	Shaun Smith (on loan from Hull City)
9	FW	IRL	Richie Foran (on loan to Oxford United)
10	FW	ENG	Steve Livingstone (retired)
14	FW	ENG	Brian Wake (to Gretna)
15	FW	ENG	Craig Russell (to Darlington)

No.	Pos.	Nation	Player
15	DF	ENG	Paul Warhurst (released)
16	DF	IRL	Des Byrne (released)
18	MF	ENG	Ryan Baldacchino (to Gretna)
25	DF	ENG	David Lynn (to Workington)
30	MF	ENG	Steven Schumacher (on loan from Everton)
30	FW	ENG	Matty Fryatt (on loan from Walsall)

== Results & fixtures ==
=== Third Division ===
==== League table ====
Pos	Team	Pld	W	D	L	GF	GA	GD	Pts	Promotion or relegation
20	Macclesfield Town	46	13	13	20	54	69	−15	52	
21	Rochdale	46	12	14	20	49	58	−9	50	
22	Scunthorpe United	46	11	16	19	69	72	−3	49	
23	Carlisle United (R)	46	12	9	25	46	69	−23	45	Relegation to Football Conference
24	York City (R)	46	10	14	22	35	66	−31	44	Relegation to Football Conference

Rules for classification: In the Football League goals scored (GF) takes precedence over goal difference (GD).
(R) Relegated

==== Matches ====
Match Day	Date	Opponent	H/A	Score	Carlisle United Scorer(s)	Attendance	Report
1	9 August	York City	H	1–2			
2	16 August	Yeovil Town	A	0–3			
3	23 August	Bristol Rovers	H	0–2			
4	25 August	Boston United	A	0–1			
5	30 August	Cambridge United	H	0–0			
6	6 September	Darlington	A	0–2			
7	13 September	Rochdale	H	3–2			
8	16 September	Northampton Town	A	0–2			
9	20 September	Southend United	A	2–2			
10	27 September	Swansea City	H	1–2			
11	30 September	Leyton Orient	H	0–1			
12	4 October	Kidderminster Harriers	A	1–2			
13	12 October	Hull City	A	1–2			
14	18 October	Macclesfield Town	H	0–1			
15	21 October	Scunthorpe United	H	1–4			
16	25 October	Huddersfield Town	A	1–2			
17	1 November	Lincoln City	A	0–2			
18	15 November	Mansfield Town	H	0–2			
19	22 November	Cheltenham Town	A	1–2			
20	29 November	Doncaster Rovers	H	0–1			
21	13 December	Oxford United	A	1–2			
22	20 December	Torquay United	H	2–0			
23	26 December	Bury	A	3–1			
24	28 December	Darlington	H	1–1			
25	3 January	Boston United	H	2–1			
26	10 January	York City	A	0–2			
27	17 January	Yeovil Town	H	2–0			
28	24 January	Bristol Rovers	A	0–1			
29	7 February	Bury	H	2–1			
30	14 February	Hull City	H	1–1			
31	17 February	Cambridge United	A	2–2			
32	21 February	Macclesfield Town	A	1–1			
33	6 March	Torquay United	A	1–4			
34	9 March	Huddersfield Town	H	1–0			
35	13 March	Oxford United	H	2–0			
36	16 March	Northampton Town	H	1–1			
37	20 March	Rochdale	A	0–2			
38	23 March	Scunthorpe United	A	3–2			
39	27 March	Southend United	H	1–2			
40	3 April	Swansea City	A	2–1			
41	10 April	Kidderminster Harriers	H	1–0			
42	12 April	Leyton Orient	A	1–1			
43	17 April	Lincoln City	H	0–2			
44	24 April	Mansfield Town	A	3–2			
45	1 May	Cheltenham Town	H	1–1			
46	8 May	Doncaster Rovers	A	0–1			

=== English League Cup ===
Round	Date	Opponent	H/A	Score	Carlisle United Scorer(s)	Attendance	Report
1	12 August	Walsall	A	1–2			

=== FA Cup ===
Round	Date	Opponent	H/A	Score	Carlisle United Scorer(s)	Attendance	Report
1	8 November	Oldham Athletic	A	0–3			

=== Football League Trophy ===
Round	Date	Opponent	H/A	Score	Carlisle United Scorer(s)	Attendance	Report
1	14 October	Rochdale	H	2–0		1,828	
2	3 November	Huddersfield Town	H	2–0		1,346	
QF	9 December	Sheffield Wednesday	H	0–3		2,869	
