= 2005 Conference National play-off final =

2005 Football Conference play-off final
- Event: 2004–05 Football Conference
Stevenage Borough	Carlisle United
0	1
- Date: 14 May 2005
- Venue: Britannia Stadium, Stoke-on-Trent
- Man of the Match: Derek Holmes (Carlisle United)
- Referee: Jonathan Moss (West Yorkshire)
- Attendance: 13,422

The 2005 Football Conference play-off final took place on 14 May 2005 and was contested between Stevenage Borough and Carlisle United. It was held at the Britannia Stadium, Stoke and had an attendance of 13,422.

== Match ==
=== Summary ===
Carlisle had the first major chance when the ball fell to Derek Holmes and he turned and shot, but Alan Julian in the Stevenage goal saved comfortably. Stevenage's first chance came when they had a corner which they took quickly and Anthony Elding shot just wide from outside the area. The same corner routine had paid off in the semi-final as it had led to Dino Maamria's winning goal against Hereford.

At the other end, Holmes flicked on a long ball for Glenn Murray who controlled the ball on his chest and shot in one movement from 14 yards out, but Julian again saved well. Carlisle then took the lead in the 23rd minute after Tom Cowan's cross was headed into the bottom corner by Peter Murphy. Stevenage pressed forward looking for the equalising goal with Jon Brady finding Darryn Stamp at the back post with a good cross, whose header was deflected over. At the other end, Goodliffe cleared a header off the line to keep Stevenage in the match.

The second half saw Stevenage try everything to get an equaliser. Elding blazed over from just inside the area, George Boyd hit a well worked free kick over the crossbar while Michael Warner had a good run into the area, cutting inside onto his left foot before seeing his goalbound shot saved by the feet of Matt Glennon. In stoppage time there was a late flurry with the ball bouncing around in the Carlisle penalty area with shots raining in from all angles. But Stevenage could not break down Carlisle and it was they who won and gained promotion back to the Football League at first invitation.

=== Details ===
14 May 2005
19:30 BST

Stevenage Borough	0–1	Carlisle United
	Report	Murphy 23'

Britannia Stadium, Stoke-on-Trent
Attendance: 13,422
Referee: Jonathan Moss (West Yorkshire)

GK	1	Alan Julian
DF	2	Michael Warner	Booked
DF	5	Jason Goodliffe (c)		(substituted off) 81'
DF	6	Barry Laker		(substituted off) 52'
DF	25	Ronnie Henry
MF	15	Dannie Bulman
MF	33	Justin Gregory
MF	7	Jon Brady
FW	9	Dino Maamria
FW	37	Anthony Elding
FW	27	Darryn Stamp		(substituted off) 66'
Substitutes:
GK	17	Mark Westhead
MF	4	Rob Quinn
MF	23	Simon Weatherstone		(substituted in) 81'
MF	21	George Boyd		(substituted in) 52'
FW	20	Jon Nurse		(substituted in) 66'
Manager:
Graham Westley

GK	1	Matt Glennon
DF	3	Tom Cowan
DF	6	Kevin Gray (c)
DF	21	Danny Livesey
DF	16	David Beharall
MF	17	Chris Lumsdon
MF	7	Brendan McGill	Booked
MF	8	Chris Billy
MF	4	Peter Murphy	Booked
FW	25	Glenn Murray	Booked	(substituted off) 71'
FW	9	Derek Holmes		(substituted off) 86'
Substitutes:
GK	20	Keiren Westwood
DF	2	Paul Arnison
MF	28	Adam Murray
FW	23	Magno Vieira	Booked	(substituted in) 71'
FW	19	Karl Hawley		(substituted in) 86'
Manager:
Paul Simpson

Match rules:

- 90 minutes.
- 30 minutes of extra time if necessary.
- Penalty shoot-out if scores still level.
- Five named substitutes
- Maximum of three substitutions.
