= Ben Petty =

English footballer (born 1977)

Personal information
- Full name: Benjamin James Petty
- Date of birth: 22 March 1977 (age 49)
- Place of birth: Solihull, England
- Position: Defender

Team information
- Current team: Birmingham City (assistant manager)

Youth career
- 1994–1999: Aston Villa

Senior career*
| Years | Team | Apps | (Gls) |
| 1999–2001 | Stoke City | 46 | (0) |
| 2001–2003 | Hull City | 29 | (0) |
| 2002–2003 | → Stafford Rangers (loan) | 11 | (0) |
| 2003 | → Moor Green (loan) | 9 | (0) |
| 2003 | Burton Albion | 7 | (0) |
| 2003–2006 | Moor Green | 111 | (0) |
| 2006–2007 | Redditch United | | |
| Total | | 213 | (0) |

Managerial career
- 2016: Aston Villa U18s
- 2016–2021: Leicester City U21s (assistant)
- 2021–2024: Leicester City U21s
- 2024–: Birmingham City (assistant)
- * Club domestic league appearances and goals

Benjamin James Petty (born 22 March 1977) is an English football coach and former player. He played in the Football League for Hull City and Stoke City. He was appointed assistant manager of Birmingham City in 2024.

== Career ==
Petty was born in Solihull and started his career off in the youth ranks at Aston Villa. He failed to make the grade at Villa and moved on to Brian Little's Stoke City in November 1998. He provided useful back-up in Stoke defence in 1998–99, making 13 appearances as Stoke missed out on the play-offs. Little left Stoke at the end of the season and in came Gary Megson who brought in his own players meaning that Petty was overlooked. After making just three appearances under Megson, Petty forced his way back into the side once Guðjón Þórðarson took over in November 1999 and ended the 1999–2000 season with 19 appearances. He did play in five matches of Stoke's Football League Trophy winning run, but failed to make the matchday squad in the final, and in that season Stoke lost in the league play-offs to Gillingham. In 2000–01 Petty played in 34 matches for Stoke and scored his only senior goal in a 4–0 win over Walsall in the Football League Trophy. Stoke again reached the end-of-season play-offs where they faced Walsall. In the first leg both sides were cancelling each other out with Petty being brought on as a substitute. With the match into added time Walsall broke clear of City's defence and Petty 'sacrificed' himself bringing down the Walsall striker and was sent-off and the match ended 0–0. It was all in vain however as Stoke lost the second leg 4–2.

It proved to the last act in a Stoke shirt as he left for Hull City in July 2001. After a decent start with Hull, making 34 appearances in 2001–02 he fell out with manager Jan Mølby and Petty drifted into non-league football. He played for Stafford Rangers, Moor Green, Burton Albion and Redditch United before deciding to take up coaching. He worked as a coach for the Aston Villa Academy team until 2016, when he joined Leicester City's under 23s.

He was appointed as Birmingham City's assistant manager in June 2024.

== Career statistics ==
Appearances and goals by club, season and competition
| Club | Season | League | | | FA Cup | | League Cup | | Other | | Total | |
| Club | Season | Division | Apps | Goals | Apps | Goals | Apps | Goals | Apps | Goals | Apps | Goals |
|---|---|---|---|---|---|---|---|---|---|---|---|---|
| Stoke City | 1998–99 | Second Division | 11 | 0 | 1 | 0 | 0 | 0 | 1 (Note: Appearances in Football League Trophy) | 0 | 13 | 0 |
| Stoke City | 1999–2000 | Second Division | 13 | 0 | 0 | 0 | 1 | 0 | 5 | 0 | 19 | 0 |
| Stoke City | 2000–01 | Second Division | 22 | 0 | 2 | 0 | 4 | 0 | 5 (Note: Four appearances in Football League Trophy and one in Second Division play-offs) | 1 | 33 | 1 |
| Stoke City | Total | | 46 | 0 | 3 | 0 | 5 | 0 | 11 | 1 | 65 | 1 |
| Hull City | 2001–02 | Third Division | 27 | 0 | 2 | 0 | 2 | 0 | 3 | 0 | 34 | 0 |
| Hull City | 2002–03 | Third Division | 2 | 0 | 0 | 0 | 0 | 0 | 0 | 0 | 2 | 0 |
| Hull City | Total | | 29 | 0 | 2 | 0 | 2 | 0 | 3 | 0 | 36 | 0 |
| Burton Albion | 2002–03 | Football Conference | 7 | 0 | 0 | 0 | 0 | 0 | 0 | 0 | 7 | 0 |
| Career total | | | 82 | 0 | 5 | 0 | 7 | 0 | 14 | 1 | 108 | 1 |
