= 1999–2000 Port Vale F.C. season =

Port Vale F.C.
1999–2000 season
- Chairman: Bill Bell
- Manager: Brian Horton
- Stadium: Vale Park
- Football League First Division: 23rd (36 points)
- FA Cup: Third Round (eliminated by Leeds United)
- League Cup: First Round (eliminated by Chester City)
- Player of the Year: Tommy Widdrington
- Top goalscorer: League: Tony Rougier (8); All: Tony Rougier (9)
- Highest home attendance: 10,250 vs. Manchester City, 30 October 1999
- Lowest home attendance: 2,625 vs. Chester City, 24 August 1999
- Average home league attendance: 5,906
- Biggest win: 2–0 (twice) and 3–1 (twice)
- Biggest defeat: 0–3 vs. Ipswich Town, 8 April 2000
Home colours	Away colours

The 1999–2000 season was Port Vale's 88th season of football in the English Football League, and sixth successive season in the First Division. Under manager Brian Horton, Vale struggled throughout the campaign and eventually suffered relegation, finishing 23rd, a full 13 points adrift of safety.

In the cups, their efforts were swiftly cut short — they exited the FA Cup in the Third Round, and endured a shock First Round defeat in the League Cup, losing to Fourth Division side Chester City for a second straight season. Despite the lack of incoming transfers, the club sold young players for a total of approximately £1.5 million, a strategic move made amid growing financial woes and the looming threat of bankruptcy. On the field, Tony Rougier emerged as the top scorer, netting eight league goals and nine in all competitions, while stalwart Tony Naylor contributed eight goals over the season. The campaign also marked the transition from the celebrated '90s core — veterans like Martin Foyle, Paul Musselwhite, and Ian Bogie departed, while emerging talents such as Micky Cummins and Mark Goodlad began to feature.

Vale's season ended in disappointment as financial strain and squad turnover contributed to relegation, despite Rougier's goals.

== Overview ==
=== First Division ===
The pre-season saw Brian Horton sign Jeff Minton (Brighton & Hove Albion), Tommy Widdrington (Grimsby Town), and Steve Rimmer (Manchester City) on free transfers. He also took Andy Oakes in on loan from Derby County and Matt Glennon from Bolton Wanderers as back-up goalkeepers, and striker Martin Aldridge on loan from Blackpool.

The season started with a goalless draw at Ewood Park with Blackburn Rovers, but soon went downhill with two defeats. Vale then entered inconsistent form, winning three and losing three in a run of six games. On 5 September, Vale beat Grimsby Town by three goals to one, with Bent scoring his first goal for the club. However, just two points from seven October games indicated Vale's future. Also in the month, striker Marcus Bent, signed by John Rudge nine months earlier for £375,000, was sold to Sheffield United for a bargain £300,000 and was later sold on by the "Blades" for a £1.7 million profit. The club set a record on 5 September, when just 3,737 turned up to see a 3–0 win over Grimsby Town – a division record low for a television match. The Vale ended the year in solid form, unbeaten in seven games, despite just two victories (over rivals Crewe Alexandra and against Sheffield United at Bramall Lane). In December, Carl Griffiths was sold back to former club Leyton Orient for £100,000.

In January, Horton signed defender Sagi Burton (Sheffield United) on a free transfer and signed Martin Bullock and Gareth Taylor on one-month loans from Barnsley and Manchester City respectively. Controversially, he also sold promising young defender Anthony Gardner to Tottenham Hotspur for £1 million. On 22 January, Vale won 3–1 at home to Birmingham Citydespite Widdrington being sent off in the opening minute of the match. The next month, David Healy would arrive on loan from Manchester United for the remainder of the season. Also, former international Ville Viljanen became the first Finn to play for the club when he joined from Västra Frölunda IF. In March, Horton made two key signings, bringing two young players that would be with the club for several years to come: Irish midfielder Micky Cummins (Middlesbrough) and goalkeeper Mark Goodlad (Nottingham Forest). He also sold Tony Butler to West Bromwich Albion for £140,000. During this transfer activity, Vale won just once in a sequence of 17 games. A 2–0 win over Portsmouth on 1 April raised hopes of Vale escaping the drop, but Horton's side gained just three points in their final eight games, thus dooming Vale to third-tier football.

They finished in 23rd place with 36 points, a massive 13 points away from the safety of West Bromwich Albion, and only ahead of Swindon Town on goals scored. With just seven victories, they had the fewest wins in the division. Tony Rougier only needed nine goals to become the club's top scorer. The relegation meant that Brian Horton lost his 'proud record' of never being relegated as a player or as a manager.

At the end of the season numerous players were allowed to leave on free transfers: eight-year club veteran goalkeeper Paul Musselwhite (Hull City); five-year club favourite Ian Bogie (Kidderminster Harriers); Wayne Corden (Mansfield Town); Stewart Talbot (Rotherham United); Mark Snijders (AFC '34); Kevin Pilkington (Aberystwyth Town); and Steve Rimmer (Marine). Legendary striker Martin Foyle also retired after nine years as Vale's star striker. Simon Barker also retired at the age of 35. Meanwhile, the club's board increased to five members: Bill Bell (chairman), Andrew Bellfield, Paul Wright, Neil Hughes, and Charles Machin.

=== Finances ===
The club's shirt sponsors were Tunstall Assurance.

=== Cup competitions ===
In the FA Cup, Vale lost 2–0 to Premier League club Leeds United at Elland Road to exit the competition in the third round. Just 11,912 turned up for the game after the Vale board refused to allow a price reduction.

In the League Cup, for the second successive season, Third Division Chester City knocked the Vale out at the first round. In the 2–1 defeat at the Deva Stadium, both sides finished the game with ten men, and as the return leg was a 4–4 draw, Chester achieved a 6–5 aggregate win.

== Results ==
=== Football League First Division ===
==== League table ====
Pos	Team	Pld	W	D	L	GF	GA	GD	Pts	Qualification or relegation
20	Grimsby Town	46	13	12	21	41	67	−26	51	
21	West Bromwich Albion	46	10	19	17	43	60	−17	49	
22	Walsall (R)	46	11	13	22	52	77	−25	46	Relegation to the Second Division
23	Port Vale (R)	46	7	15	24	48	69	−21	36	Relegation to the Second Division
24	Swindon Town (R)	46	8	12	26	38	77	−39	36	Relegation to the Second Division

Rules for classification: 1) Points; 2) Goal difference; 3) Goals scored
(R) Relegated

==== Results by matchday ====
Round	1	2	3	4	5	6	7	8	9	10	11	12	13	14	15	16	17	18	19	20	21	22	23	24	25	26	27	28	29	30	31	32	33	34	35	36	37	38	39	40	41	42	43	44	45	46
Ground	A	H	A	H	A	H	H	A	H	A	A	H	H	A	A	H	H	A	H	A	A	H	A	A	H	A	H	H	H	A	H	A	A	H	A	H	A	H	H	A	H	A	A	H	A	H
Result	D	L	L	W	L	W	L	L	W	L	D	L	L	D	L	L	W	D	D	W	D	D	D	L	L	D	W	D	L	L	D	L	L	L	D	L	L	W	D	L	D	L	D	L	L	L
Position	12	18	23	19	20	13	16	17	15	17	17	21	23	21	24	24	20	19	20	18	19	18	20	21	21	22	22	23	23	23	23	23	23	23	23	23	23	23	23	23	23	23	23	23	23	23
Points	1	1	1	4	4	7	7	7	10	10	11	11	11	12	12	12	15	16	17	20	21	22	23	23	23	24	27	28	28	28	29	29	29	29	30	30	30	33	34	34	35	35	36	36	36	36

Source: Statto
A = Away; H = Home; W = Win; D = Draw; L = Loss

==== Matches ====
7 August 1999 1	Blackburn Rovers	0–0	Port Vale	Blackburn
		Report		Stadium: Ewood Park; Attendance: 20,530; Referee: David Laws

14 August 1999 2	Port Vale	1–2	West Bromwich Albion	Burslem
	Minton 38' (pen.)	Report	Hughes 14'; Kilbane 55'	Stadium: Vale Park; Attendance: 7,891; Referee: Eddie Wolstenholme

21 August 1999 3	Birmingham City	4–2	Port Vale	Birmingham
	Hughes 8', 51'; Furlong 18', 34'	Report	Rougier 30'; Naylor 41'	Stadium: St Andrew's; Attendance: 18,089; Referee: Clive Wilkes

28 August 1999 4	Port Vale	1–0	Tranmere Rovers	Burslem
	Naylor 64'	Report		Stadium: Vale Park; Attendance: 4,657; Referee: David Crick

31 August 1999 5	Queens Park Rangers	3–2	Port Vale	Shepherd's Bush, West London
	Wardley 16', 63'; Kiwomya 77'	Report	Minton 75' (pen.); Gardner 79'	Stadium: Loftus Road; Attendance: 9,502; Referee: Steve Bennett

5 September 1999 6	Port Vale	3–1	Grimsby Town	Burslem
	Bent 21'; Naylor 31'; Foyle 85'	Report	Allen 60'	Stadium: Vale Park; Attendance: 3,737; Referee: Mike Dean

11 September 1999 7	Port Vale	0–2	Fulham	Burslem
		Report	Peschisolido 36'; Coleman 56'	Stadium: Vale Park; Attendance: 6,130; Referee: Mike Jones

18 September 1999 8	Stockport County	1–0	Port Vale	Stockport
	Nicholson 15'	Report		Stadium: Edgeley Park; Attendance: 7,632; Referee: Anthony Leake

25 September 1999 9	Port Vale	2–0	Swindon Town	Burslem
	Carragher 53'; Talia 72' (og.)	Report		Stadium: Vale Park; Attendance: 4,629; Referee: Mike Reed

2 October 1999 10	Manchester City	2–1	Port Vale	Manchester
	Bishop 30', 36'	Report	Foyle 63'	Stadium: Maine Road; Attendance: 31,608; Referee: Steve Baines

9 October 1999 11	Huddersfield Town	2–2	Port Vale	Huddersfield
	Stewart 2' (pen.); Irons 50'	Report	Gardner 48'; Foyle 71'	Stadium: Kirklees Stadium; Attendance: 11,885; Referee: Scott Mathieson

16 October 1999 12	Port Vale	0–1	Norwich City	Burslem
		Report	Fleming 82'	Stadium: Vale Park; Attendance: 5,790; Referee: David Elleray

19 October 1999 13	Port Vale	0–2	Nottingham Forest	Burslem
19:45 BST		Report	Bonalair 6'; Wright 44'	Stadium: Vale Park; Attendance: 5,714; Referee: Barry Knight

23 October 1999 14	Wolverhampton Wanderers	2–2	Port Vale	Wolverhampton
	Sedgley 47'; Curle 89' (pen.)	Report	Walsh 80'; Rougier 84'	Stadium: Molineux Stadium; Attendance: 20,488; Referee: Phil Richards

26 October 1999 15	Swindon Town	2–1	Port Vale	Swindon
	Onuora 1'; Grazioli 89'	Report	Rougier 22'	Stadium: County Ground; Attendance: 5,703; Referee: Lee Cable

30 October 1999 16	Port Vale	1–2	Manchester City	Burslem
	Foyle 40'	Report	Snijders 72' (og.); Granville 77'	Stadium: Vale Park; Attendance: 10,250; Referee: Graham Laws

5 November 1999 17	Port Vale	1–0	Crewe Alexandra	Burslem
	Rougier 75'	Report		Stadium: Vale Park; Attendance: 5,584; Referee: Andrew Hall

12 November 1999 18	Walsall	0–0	Port Vale	Walsall
		Report		Stadium: Bescot Stadium; Attendance: 6,190; Referee: Paul Taylor

20 November 1999 19	Port Vale	2–2	Crystal Palace	Burslem
	Rougier 20'; Foyle 78'	Report	McKenzie 54'; Svensson 88'	Stadium: Vale Park; Attendance: 5,170; Referee: Roy Pearson

23 November 1999 20	Sheffield United	2–3	Port Vale	Sheffield
	Sandford 22'	Report	Eyre 45'; Tankard 71'; Gardner 80'	Stadium: Bramall Lane; Attendance: 8,965; Referee: Trevor Jones

27 November 1999 21	Charlton Athletic	2–2	Port Vale	Charlton, London
	Mendonca 16', 40'	Report	Rougier 46'; Foyle 55'	Stadium: The Valley; Attendance: 19,266; Referee: Mick Fletcher

4 December 1999 22	Port Vale	0–0	Blackburn Rovers	Burslem
		Report		Stadium: Vale Park; Attendance: 6,084; Referee: Paul Rejer

18 December 1999 23	Portsmouth	0–0	Port Vale	Portsmouth
		Report		Stadium: Fratton Park; Attendance: 11,869; Referee: Kevin Lynch

28 December 1999 24	Barnsley	3–1	Port Vale	Barnsley
	Tinkler 63'; Barnard 67'; Shipperley 87'	Report	Minton 71'	Stadium: Oakwell; Attendance: 16,855; Referee: Chris Foy

3 January 2000 25	Port Vale	1–2	Ipswich Town	Burslem
	Naylor 50'	Report	Holland 43'; Scowcroft 52'	Stadium: Vale Park; Attendance: 6,908; Referee: Mike Pike

15 January 2000 26	West Bromwich Albion	0–0	Port Vale	West Bromwich
		Report		Stadium: The Hawthorns; Attendance: 10,831; Referee: Rob Styles

22 January 2000 27	Port Vale	3–1	Birmingham City	Burslem
	Naylor 14'; Widdrington 86' (pen.); Rougier 90'	Report	Hughes 48'	Stadium: Vale Park; Attendance: 7,702; Referee: George Cain

5 February 2000 28	Port Vale	1–1	Queens Park Rangers	Burslem
	Bullock 28'	Report	Wardley 37'	Stadium: Vale Park; Attendance: 5,493; Referee: John Kirkby

8 February 2000 29	Port Vale	0–1	Bolton Wanderers	Burslem
		Report	Guðjohnsen 77'	Stadium: Vale Park; Attendance: 5,092; Referee: Terry Heilbron

12 February 2000 30	Grimsby Town	2–0	Port Vale	Cleethorpes
	Clare 19'; Allen 27'	Report		Stadium: Blundell Park; Attendance: 6,265; Referee: Phil Richards

26 February 2000 31	Port Vale	1–1	Stockport County	Burslem
	Widdrington 45'	Report	Wilbraham 9'	Stadium: Vale Park; Attendance: 5,663; Referee: Phil Joslin

4 March 2000 32	Fulham	3–1	Port Vale	Fulham, West London
	Clark 15', 52'; Melville 29'	Report	Healy 74'	Stadium: Craven Cottage; Attendance: 10,418; Referee: Guy Stretton

7 March 2000 33	Crewe Alexandra	2–1	Port Vale	Crewe
	Cramb; Lunt	Report	Viljanen	Stadium: Gresty Road; Attendance: 8,044; Referee: Alan Butler

11 March 2000 34	Port Vale	2–3	Sheffield United	Burslem
	Healy 45'; Rougier 90'	Report	Bent 23'; Woodhouse 47'; D'Jaffo 49'	Stadium: Vale Park; Attendance: 5,484; Referee: Mark Cowburn

18 March 2000 35	Crystal Palace	1–1	Port Vale	Selhurst, Croydon
	Rougier 64' (og.)	Report	Widdrington 73' (pen.)	Stadium: Selhurst Park; Attendance: 18,954; Referee: Matt Messias

21 March 2000 36	Port Vale	1–2	Walsall	Burslem
	Cummins 59'	Report	Matías 12'; Fenton 45'	Stadium: Vale Park; Attendance: 5,737; Referee: Graham Frankland

25 March 2000 37	Bolton Wanderers	2–1	Port Vale	Bolton
	Guðjohnsen 16'; Johnston 42'	Report	Viljanen 53'	Stadium: Reebok Stadium; Attendance: 12,292; Referee: David Laws

1 April 2000 38	Port Vale	2–0	Portsmouth	Burslem
	Viljanen 15'; Widdrington 43' (pen.)	Report		Stadium: Vale Park; Attendance: 5,426; Referee: Paul Rejer

4 April 2000 39	Port Vale	2–2	Charlton Athletic	Burslem
	Viljanen 39'; Burton 68'	Report	Rufus 63'; Hunt 74'	Stadium: Vale Park; Attendance: 4,513; Referee: Bill Jordan

8 April 2000 40	Ipswich Town	3–0	Port Vale	Ipswich
	Scowcroft 12'; Johnson 39'; Holland 83'	Report		Stadium: Portman Road; Attendance: 19,663; Referee: Steve Baines

15 April 2000 41	Port Vale	2–2	Barnsley	Burslem
	Burton 90'; Widdrington 90' (pen.)	Report	Hignett 43'; Curtis 66'	Stadium: Vale Park; Attendance: 5,918; Referee: Paul Taylor

18 April 2000 42	Tranmere Rovers	2–1	Port Vale	Prenton
	Kelly 60', 89'	Report	Healy 41'	Stadium: Prenton Park; Attendance: 5,602; Referee: Paul Alcock

22 April 2000 43	Norwich City	0–0	Port Vale	Norwich
		Report		Stadium: Carrow Road; Attendance: 15,526; Referee: Mark Halsey

24 April 2000 44	Port Vale	1–2	Huddersfield Town	Burslem
	Naylor 38'	Report	Vincent 8'; Irons 54' (pen.)	Stadium: Vale Park; Attendance: 5,828; Referee: Trevor Jones

29 April 2000 45	Nottingham Forest	2–0	Port Vale	Nottingham
19:45 BST	John 11'; Prutton 34'	Report		Stadium: City Ground; Attendance: 15,534; Referee: Mike Riley

7 May 2000 46	Port Vale	0–1	Wolverhampton Wanderers	Burslem
		Report	Robinson 85'	Stadium: Vale Park; Attendance: 8,525; Referee: Clive Wilkes

=== FA Cup ===
12 December 1999 R3	Leeds United	2–0	Port Vale	Beeston, Leeds
	Bakke 61', 68'	Report		Stadium: Elland Road; Attendance: 11,912; Referee: Steve Dunn

=== League Cup ===
10 August 1999 R1 1st Leg	Chester City	2–1	Port Vale	Chester
	Richardson 7'; Beckett 72' (pen.)	Report	Rougier 15'	Stadium: Deva Stadium; Attendance: 2,102; Referee: Trevor Jones

24 August 1999 R1 2nd Leg	Port Vale	4–4 (5–6 agg.)	Chester City	Burslem
	Naylor 35', 64'; Minton 45' (pen.); Griffiths 84'	Report	Beckett 5', 13' (pen.); Shelton 71'; Jones 77'	Stadium: Vale Park; Attendance: 2,625

== Squad statistics ==
=== Appearances and goals ===
Key to positions: GK – Goalkeeper; DF – Defender; MF – Midfielder; FW – Forward

No.	Pos	Nat	Player	Total		First Division		FA Cup		League Cup	
No.	Pos	Nat	Player	Apps	Goals	Apps	Goals	Apps	Goals	Apps	Goals
1	GK	(England) ENG	Paul Musselwhite	32	0	30	0	1	0	1	0
2	DF	(England) ENG	Michael Walsh	14	1	12	1	0	0	2	0
3	DF	(England) ENG	Allen Tankard	37	1	35	1	1	0	1	0
4	MF	(England) ENG	Dave Brammer	31	0	29	0	0	0	2	0
6	FW	(Finland) FIN	Ville Viljanen	14	4	14	4	0	0	0	0
7	DF	(England) ENG	Alex Smith	15	0	13	0	0	0	2	0
8	MF	(Republic of Ireland) IRL	Micky Cummins	12	1	12	1	0	0	0	0
9	DF	(Saint Kitts and Nevis) SKN	Sagi Burton	20	2	20	2	0	0	0	0
10	MF	(England) ENG	Jeff Minton	26	4	23	3	1	0	2	1
11	MF	(England) ENG	Tommy Widdrington	39	5	38	5	1	0	0	0
12	FW	(England) ENG	Tony Naylor	39	8	36	6	1	0	2	2
13	GK	(England) ENG	Kevin Pilkington	16	0	15	0	0	0	1	0
14	MF	(England) ENG	Richard Eyre	33	1	30	1	1	0	2	0
15	FW	(England) ENG	Martin Foyle	24	6	22	6	1	0	1	0
16	MF	(England) ENG	Wayne Corden	2	0	2	0	0	0	0	0
17	MF	(Trinidad and Tobago) TTO	Tony Rougier	41	9	38	8	1	0	2	1
18	MF	(Republic of Ireland) IRL	George O'Callaghan	11	0	11	0	0	0	0	0
19	DF	(England) ENG	Matt Carragher	39	1	37	1	0	0	2	0
20	DF	(England) ENG	Steve Rimmer	2	0	2	0	0	0	0	0
21	DF	(Northern Ireland) NIR	Liam Burns	25	0	24	0	1	0	0	0
22	MF	(England) ENG	Neil Brisco	14	0	13	0	1	0	0	0
23	MF	(England) ENG	Stewart Talbot	6	0	6	0	0	0	0	0
24	FW	(Northern Ireland) NIR	David Healy	16	3	16	3	0	0	0	0
25	MF	(England) ENG	Ian Bogie	9	0	9	0	0	0	0	0
26	GK	(England) ENG	Mark Goodlad	1	0	1	0	0	0	0	0
27	DF	(Netherlands) NED	Mark Snijders	22	0	21	0	1	0	0	0
28	DF	(England) ENG	Paul Donnelly	4	0	4	0	0	0	0	0
29	MF	(England) ENG	Stewart Clitheroe	0	0	0	0	0	0	0	0
30	FW	(England) ENG	Anthony Tarr	0	0	0	0	0	0	0	0
31	MF	(England) ENG	Paul Taylor	0	0	0	0	0	0	0	0
33	GK	(England) ENG	Chris Gowen	0	0	0	0	0	0	0	0
Players who featured but departed the club during the season:
5	DF	(England) ENG	Tony Butler	15	0	15	0	0	0	0	0
6	DF	(England) ENG	Anthony Gardner	29	3	26	3	1	0	2	0
8	FW	(England) ENG	Marcus Bent	9	1	8	1	0	0	1	0
8	MF	(England) ENG	Martin Bullock	6	1	6	1	0	0	0	0
9	FW	(England) ENG	Carl Griffiths	7	1	5	0	0	0	2	1
24	MF	(England) ENG	Simon Barker	6	0	5	0	0	0	1	0
24	DF	(Wales) WAL	Gareth Taylor	4	0	4	0	0	0	0	0
26	GK	(England) ENG	Andy Oakes	0	0	0	0	0	0	0	0
26	GK	(England) ENG	Matt Glennon	0	0	0	0	0	0	0	0
33	FW	(England) ENG	Martin Aldridge	3	0	3	0	0	0	0	0

=== Top scorers ===
Place	Position	Nation	Number	Name	First Division	FA Cup	League Cup	Total
1	MF	Trinidad	17	Tony Rougier	8	0	1	9
2	FW	England	12	Tony Naylor	6	0	2	8
3	FW	England	15	Martin Foyle	6	0	0	6
4	MF	England	11	Tommy Widdrington	5	0	0	5
–	FW	Finland	6	Ville Viljanen	4	0	0	4
6	MF	England	10	Jeff Minton	3	0	1	4
7	DF	England}	6	Anthony Gardner	3	0	0	3
–	FW	Northern Ireland	24	David Healy	3	0	0	3
9	DF	Saint Kitts	9	Sagi Burton	2	0	0	2
10	MF	England	14	Richard Eyre	1	0	0	1
–	DF	England	3	Allen Tankard	1	0	0	1
–	DF	England	19	Matt Carragher	1	0	0	1
–	FW	England	8	Marcus Bent	1	0	0	1
–	DF	England	2	Michael Walsh	1	0	0	1
–	MF	England	8	Martin Bullock	1	0	0	1
–	MF	Ireland	8	Micky Cummins	1	0	0	1
–	FW	England	9	Carl Griffiths	0	0	1	1
–		–	–	Own goals	1	0	0	0
				TOTALS	48	0	5	53

== Transfers ==
=== Transfers in ===
Date from	Position	Nationality	Name	From	Fee	Ref.
June 1999	MF	ENG	Jeff Minton	Brighton & Hove Albion	Free transfer	
June 1999	DF	ENG	Steve Rimmer	Manchester City	Free transfer	
June 1999	MF	ENG	Tommy Widdrington	Grimsby Town	Free transfer	
January 2000	DF	SKN	Sagi Burton	Sheffield United	Free transfer	
February 2000	FW	FIN	Ville Viljanen	(Sweden) Västra Frölunda IF	Free transfer	
March 2000	MF	IRL	Micky Cummins	Middlesbrough	Free transfer	
March 2000	GK	ENG	Mark Goodlad	Nottingham Forest	Free transfer	

=== Transfers out ===
Date from	Position	Nationality	Name	To	Fee	Ref.
October 1999	FW	ENG	Marcus Bent	Sheffield United	£375,000	
December 1999	FW	WAL	Carl Griffiths	Leyton Orient	£100,000	
January 2000	DF	ENG	Anthony Gardner	Tottenham Hotspur	£1 million	
March 2000	DF	ENG	Tony Butler	West Bromwich Albion	£140,000	
April 2000	MF	ENG	Ian Bogie	Kidderminster Harriers	Free transfer	
May 2000	MF	ENG	Simon Barker	Retired		
May 2000	DF	ENG	Steve Rimmer	Marine	Released	
July 2000	MF	ENG	Stewart Talbot	Rotherham United	Free transfer	
Summer 2000	MF	ENG	Wayne Corden	Mansfield Town	Free transfer	
Summer 2000	FW	ENG	Martin Foyle	Retired		
Summer 2000	GK	ENG	Paul Musselwhite	Sheffield Wednesday	Free transfer	
Summer 2000	GK	ENG	Kevin Pilkington	(Wales) Aberystwyth Town	Free transfer	
Summer 2000	DF	NED	Mark Snijders	(Netherlands) AFC '34	Released	
11 August 2000	MF	TRI	Tony Rougier	Reading	£325,000	

=== Loans in ===
Date from	Position	Nationality	Name	From	Date to	Ref.
20 August 1999	GK	ENG	Andy Oakes	Derby County	10 September 1999	
10 September 1999	GK	ENG	Matt Glennon	Bolton Wanderers	20 October 1999	
27 September 1999	FW	ENG	Martin Aldridge	Blackpool	27 October 1999	
11 January 2000	MF	ENG	Martin Bullock	Barnsley	28 February 2000	
19 January 2000	FW	WAL	Gareth Taylor	Manchester City	16 February 2000	
19 February 2000	MF	NIR	David Healy	Manchester United	End of season	
