= Matt Glennon =

English football goalkeeper

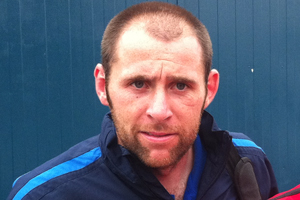
- Glennon in 2011

Personal information
- Full name: Matthew William Glennon
- Date of birth: 8 October 1978 (age 48)
- Place of birth: Stockport, England
- Height: 6 ft 2 in (1.88 m)
- Position: Goalkeeper

Youth career
- 1996–1997: Bolton Wanderers

Senior career*
Years	Team	Apps	(Gls)
1997–2001	Bolton Wanderers	0	(0)
1999	→ Port Vale (loan)	0	(0)
2000	→ Stockport County (loan)	0	(0)
2000	→ Bristol Rovers (loan)	1	(0)
2000–2001	→ Carlisle United (loan)	29	(0)
2001–2002	Hull City	35	(0)
2002–2005	Carlisle United	123	(0)
2005	Falkirk	21	(0)
2005–2006	St Johnstone	12	(1)
2006–2010	Huddersfield Town	109	(0)
2010	Bradford City	17	(0)
2010–2012	Stockport County	60	(0)
2012	Chester	12	(0)
2012–2016	FC Halifax Town	152	(0)
2016	→ Buxton (loan)		
2016	Scarborough Athletic		
2017	AFC Emley	1	(0)
Total		572	(1)

International career
2005	England C	2	(0)
- * Club domestic league appearances and goals

Matthew William Glennon (born 8 October 1978) is an English former professional footballer who played as a goalkeeper.

A graduate of the Bolton Wanderers Academy, he spent 1997 to 2001 at the club without making a first-team appearance. Instead he spent part of 1999 on loan at Port Vale, and part of 2000 on loan at Stockport County and then Bristol Rovers; he played just one game for Rovers, and never made it onto the pitch for Port Vale or Stockport County.

He did manage to find regular football on loan at Carlisle United in the 2000–01 campaign before securing a £50,000 move to Hull City in June 2001. He returned to Carlisle on a free transfer in October 2002. He helped the club to win promotion out of the Conference National as winners of the 2005 play-off final. He then switched to the Scottish side Falkirk before signing with St Johnstone in January 2006, where he managed to score a goal.

Glennon returned to England in June 2006 to play for Huddersfield Town. He spent four years with the club, making over 100 appearances, before he joined Bradford City in January 2010. He moved on to Stockport County in September 2010 and became the first-choice keeper from his arrival until his departure in January 2012. He then joined Chester and helped the club to win the Northern Premier League title in 2011–12. He signed with FC Halifax Town in July 2012 and helped the club to win promotion out of the Conference North in May 2013. He had a loan spell with Buxton in 2016. He also spent time with Scarborough Athletic before making his final appearance in football for AFC Emley in February 2017.

== Club career ==
=== Bolton Wanderers ===
Born in Stockport, Greater Manchester, Glennon started as a trainee at Bolton Wanderers, but could not break into the first-team and after unsuccessful loan spells at First Division clubs Port Vale and Stockport County, he finally made his professional debut on loan at Second Division side Bristol Rovers in a 0–0 draw with Wigan Athletic at the Memorial Stadium on 16 September 2000, and was described as "impressive" after making "important saves from Kevin Nicholls and Simon Haworth". However, he was not picked again by "Pirates" boss Ian Holloway. He joined Third Division side Carlisle United on loan in November 2000. He played 29 games for the "Cumbrians" in the 2000–01 season. In January 2001 he turned down a transfer to Bristol Rovers, that would have been worth around £250,000 for Bolton, saying that he was happy to remain on loan at Ian Atkins's Carlisle.

=== Hull City ===
In June 2001, he moved to Hull City after being signed by manager Brian Little for a £50,000 fee to compete with Paul Musselwhite for a first-team place. He started the 2001–02 in goal despite struggling with his weight, but was replaced by Musselwhite in the second half of the campaign. Glennon regained the "Tigers" number one spot under Jan Mølby's brief reign as manager before he was allowed to leave for Roddy Collins's Carlisle United on a free transfer in October 2002 after being deemed surplus to requirements at Boothferry Park by incoming manager Peter Taylor.

=== Carlisle United ===
Glennon played for Carlisle at the Millennium Stadium in the 2003 Football League Trophy final, where they were beaten 2–0 by Bristol City. He played a total of 52 games in the 2002–03 season as Carlisle avoided relegation by a one-point margin. He then featured 49 times in the 2003–04 campaign as Carlisle were relegated into the Conference. Manager Paul Simpson guided United to promotion at the first attempt as play-off winners in 2005 with a 1–0 win over Stevenage Borough at the Britannia Stadium. However, Glennon departed Brunton Park in June 2005 after declaring the contract he was offered was 'unacceptably low'.

=== Falkirk & St Johnstone ===
He went to Scotland to join SPL club Falkirk in July 2005 after saying he had been "bowled over by the quality of the stadium and training facilities". He featured 23 times in the first half of the 2005–06 season before he decided to leave the club after being dropped for Allan Ferguson by manager John Hughes. He moved on to Scottish First Division side St Johnstone in January 2006 after manager Owen Coyle released back-up goalkeeper Mark Paston. At St Johnstone he scored his only senior goal, as a desperate last-minute attempt to equalise paid off in a 2–2 draw at Ross County on 11 March. Coyle offered Glennon a contract to stay at McDiarmid Park, but he instead chose to return south of the border to sign with Peter Jackson's Huddersfield Town in June 2006.

=== Huddersfield Town ===
After moving to the Galpharm Stadium, Glennon firmly established himself as the club's first-choice keeper. He achieved a rare feat in saving three penalty kicks – two penalties were awarded, but one had to be retaken – in the same game against Crewe Alexandra on 24 February 2007, even though Town still lost the game 2–1. His perfect appearance record at Town was tarnished after he was sent off in Town's 4–1 defeat by Southend United at Roots Hall on 5 December 2007, forcing 17-year-old Alex Smithies to come on in his place. Manager Andy Ritchie said that he would appeal the red card after striker Leon Clarke admitted that he had slipped rather than been fouled by Glennon. In May 2008, he signed a two-year extension to his contract with Huddersfield Town after manager Stan Ternent declared him to be "an integral part of the squad". However, he did not feature under new manager Lee Clark, who took charge in December 2008 and kept faith in teenager Alex Smithies, and Glennon had his contract terminated in January 2010.

=== Bradford City ===
He then joined League Two side Bradford City on a deal until the end of the 2009–10 season after manager Stuart McCall needed a replacement for departed loanee goalkeeper Simon Eastwood. Glennon departed Valley Parade after he was released in May 2010.

=== Stockport County ===
In September 2010, Glennon joined his hometown club Stockport County on a permanent deal. He replaced Owain Fôn Williams as the club's first choice stopper. He started 36 league games in 2010–11 as the "Hatters" were relegated out of the Football League. Glennon made a further 26 appearances in 2011–12 but was released by manager Jim Gannon on 31 January 2012.

=== Non-League ===
On 24 February 2012, Glennon signed for Chester of the Northern Premier League Premier Division until the end of the season, keeping a clean sheet on his debut against Buxton. He helped the club to win the league title and promotion to the Conference in 2011–12, before leaving the Deva Stadium in the summer.

He signed with FC Halifax Town, another reformed club, in July 2012 to battle Phil Senior for the first-team spot. He played 51 matches in the 2012–13 campaign, and kept a clean sheet in the Conference North play-off final, as promotion was secured with a 1–0 victory over Brackley Town. He was an unused substitute in the West Riding County Cup victory over Guiseley.

He missed just one league game in the 2013–14 season as he helped the club to secure a play-off spot, where they were beaten by Cambridge United at the semi-final stage. He was an ever-present throughout the 2014–15 league campaign, as Halifax posted a ninth-place finish, and signed a new contract in the summer. Halifax were relegated at the end of the 2015–16 season, and Glennon spent the second half of the season as back-up goalkeeper to loan signing Sam Johnson. He joined Buxton on loan in January 2016. He announced his retirement after Halifax released him. However, he played once for Scarborough Athletic after being coaxed out of retirement by manager Steve Kittrick. He again came out of retirement in February 2017, to play one game for AFC Emley in a Northern Counties East League Division One against Brigg Town after regular goalkeeper Graham McLachlan picked up a suspension.

== International career ==
Glennon represented England at a semi-professional level, making two appearances for the England C team during his time at Carlisle United in 2005 when they were playing in the Conference National.

== Personal life ==
On 11 August 2000, Glennon was found not guilty of indecent assault, actual bodily harm, a charge of wounding and wounding with intent to cause grievous bodily harm following an incident at a nightclub on 31 October 1999; he stated that "it would have been a disgrace if I had not been cleared".

In 2012, Glennon and his wife Nicola opened two Hair & Beauty Lounges in Emley, Huddersfield, both named G27 in reference to his playing career.

== Career statistics ==
Appearances and goals by club, season and competition
Club	Season	League			National cup (Note: Includes FA Cup, Scottish Cup)		League cup (Note: Includes Football League Cup, Scottish League Cup)		Other		Total	
Club	Season	Division	Apps	Goals	Apps	Goals	Apps	Goals	Apps	Goals	Apps	Goals
Bolton Wanderers	1997–98	Premier League	0	0	0	0	0	0	—		0	0
Bolton Wanderers	1998–99	First Division	0	0	0	0	0	0	—		0	0
Bolton Wanderers	1999–2000	First Division	0	0	0	0	0	0	—		0	0
Bolton Wanderers	2000–01	First Division	0	0	0	0	0	0	0	0	0	0
Bolton Wanderers	Total		0	0	0	0	0	0	0	0	0	0
Port Vale (loan)	1999–2000	First Division	0	0	0	0	0	0	—		0	0
Stockport County (loan)	1999–2000	First Division	0	0	0	0	0	0	—		0	0
Bristol Rovers (loan)	2000–01	Second Division	1	0	0	0	0	0	0	0	1	0
Hull City	2001–02	Third Division	35	0	2	0	3	0	2 (Note: Appearance(s) in the EFL Trophy.)	0	42	0
Carlisle United	2000–01	Third Division	29	0	3	0	0	0	1	0	33	0
Carlisle United	2002–03	Third Division	41	0	3	0	1	0	7	0	52	0
Carlisle United	2003–04	Third Division	44	0	1	0	1	0	3	0	49	0
Carlisle United	2004–05	Conference National	38	0	4	0	—		3 (Note: Appearance(s) in the play-offs.)	0	45	0
Carlisle United	Total		152	0	11	0	2	0	14	0	179	0
Falkirk	2005–06	SPL	21	0	0	0	2	0	—		23	0
St Johnstone	2005–06	Scottish First Division	12	1	0	0	0	0	0	0	12	1
Huddersfield Town	2006–07	League One	46	0	1	0	1	0	1	0	49	0
Huddersfield Town	2007–08	League One	45	0	5	0	1	0	1	0	52	0
Huddersfield Town	2008–09	League One	18	0	1	0	2	0	0	0	21	0
Huddersfield Town	2009–10	League One	0	0	0	0	0	0	0	0	0	0
Huddersfield Town	Total		109	0	7	0	4	0	2	0	122	0
Bradford City	2009–10	League Two	17	0	0	0	0	0	0	0	17	0
Stockport County	2010–11	League Two	36	0	2	0	0	0	1	0	39	0
Stockport County	2011–12	Conference National	24	0	0	0	—		2 (Note: Appearance(s) in the FA Trophy.)	0	26	0
Stockport County	Total		60	0	2	0	0	0	3	0	65	0
Chester	2011–12	Northern Premier	12	0	0	0	—		0	0	12	0
FC Halifax Town	2012–13	Conference North	41	0	5	0	—		9	0	55	0
FC Halifax Town	2013–14	Conference Premier	45	0	2	0	—		3	0	50	0
FC Halifax Town	2014–15	Conference Premier	46	0	3	0	—		5	0	54	0
FC Halifax Town	2015–16	National League	20	0	2	0	—		0	0	22	0
FC Halifax Town	Total		152	0	12	0	0	0	17	0	181	0
AFC Emley	2016–17	North East Div. One	1	0	0	0	—		0	0	1	0
Career total (Note: Appearance(s) for Buxton and Scarborough Athletic not recorded.)			572	1	34	0	11	0	38	0	655	1

== Honours ==
Carlisle United

- Football League Trophy runner-up: 2002–03
- Conference National play-offs: 2004–05

Chester

- Northern Premier League Premier Division: 2011–12

FC Halifax Town

- Conference North play-offs: 2013
- West Riding County Cup: 2012–13
