= Mark Snijders =

Dutch footballer

Personal information
- Full name: Mark Werner Snijders
- Date of birth: 12 March 1972 (age 54)
- Place of birth: Alkmaar, Netherlands
- Height: 6 ft 2 in (1.88 m)
- Position: Defender

Youth career
- 1977–1985: Alkmaarsche boys
- 1985–1987: AFC '34

Senior career*
Years	Team	Apps	(Gls)
1989–1997	AZ Alkmaar	172	(4)
1997–2000	Port Vale	55	(2)
Total		227	(6)
- * Club domestic league appearances and goals

Mark Werner Snijders (born 12 March 1972) is a Dutch former footballer. He spent eight years with AZ Alkmaar and then three years playing in the Football League with Port Vale.

== Career ==
Snijders left his home town club AZ Alkmaar for English First Division club Port Vale following a successful trial in the summer of 1997, leaving behind a newly signed contract with AZ. He was one of several John Rudge's Dutch signings. He made his Vale debut in a 2–1 win over Stockport County at Vale Park on 9 September 1997. He scored his first goal for the club 18 days later in a 2–0 home win over Queens Park Rangers. In all, he made 25 appearances that season, picking up his second goal in a 3–2 win over Manchester City at Maine Road. His classy play and skilful reading of the game impressed the Vale faithful.

In 1998–99, the club were battling against relegation; Snijders played five games in August but fell out of the first-team and only made a total of twelve appearances. He had suffered injuries and a loss of form. The 1999–2000 season saw Vale suffer relegation and the departure of Rudge. Snijders was a semi-regular under Rudge and his replacement Brian Horton, playing 22 games that season. He was sent off at the Alexandra Stadium, in a 2–1 defeat to near rivals Crewe Alexandra on 7 March. He was released by the club at the end of the season and joined his old amateur side AFC '34, back in the Netherlands.

== Career statistics ==
Appearances and goals by club, season and competition
Club	Season	League			National cup (Note: Includes KNVB Cup, FA Cup)		Other		Total	
Club	Season	Division	Apps	Goals	Apps	Goals	Apps	Goals	Apps	Goals
AZ Alkmaar	1989–90	Eerste Divisie	5	0	0	0	0	0	5	0
AZ Alkmaar	1990–91	Eerste Divisie	21	0	0	0	0	0	21	0
AZ Alkmaar	1991–92	Eerste Divisie	30	0	1	0	0	0	31	0
AZ Alkmaar	1992–93	Eerste Divisie	34	0	2	0	0	0	36	0
AZ Alkmaar	1993–94	Eerste Divisie	32	1	2	0	0	0	34	1
AZ Alkmaar	1994–95	Eerste Divisie	22	1	4	0	0	0	26	1
AZ Alkmaar	1995–96	Eerste Divisie	3	0	3	0	0	0	6	0
AZ Alkmaar	1996–97	Eredivisie	25	2	3	0	0	0	28	2
AZ Alkmaar	Total		172	4	15	0	0	0	187	4
Port Vale	1997–98	First Division	24	2	2	0	0	0	26	2
Port Vale	1998–99	First Division	10	0	0	0	2	0	12	0
Port Vale	1999–2000	First Division	21	0	1	0	0	0	22	0
Port Vale	Total		55	2	3	0	2	0	60	2
Career total			227	6	18	0	2	0	247	6
