= 2000–01 Carlisle United F.C. season =

Carlisle United F.C.
2000–01 season
- Chairman: Michael Knighton
- Manager: Ian Atkins
- Stadium: Brunton Park
- Third Division: 22nd
- FA Cup: Third round
- League Cup: First round
- Football League Trophy: First round

For the 2000–01 season, Carlisle United F.C. competed in Football League Division Three.

== Season summary ==
After the previous season saw relegation to the Football Conference avoided on the last day for the second year in a row, manager Martin Wilkinson was sacked and replaced by Ian Atkins, who had almost steered Chester City to Football League survival at Carlisle's expense.

Any hope that Atkins would produce an immediate turn-around was quickly dashed when the first half of the campaign turned out even worse than those of either of the previous two seasons, with only three matches won before the turn of the year, and Carlisle entering 2001 looking hopelessly adrift at the bottom of the table. The team's spirits picked up thereafter thanks to a run to the third round of the FA Cup, where they were eliminated by Premier League Arsenal, and Carlisle's league form greatly improved, allowing them to secure safety on the penultimate weekend of the season (largely thanks to relegation rivals Barnet and Torquay United ending up playing each other on the final day, making it mathematically impossible for both clubs to overtake Carlisle).

With Irish businessman John Courtenay making overtures about purchasing the club, Atkins left by mutual agreement at the season's end, partly to become director of football at newly-relegated Oxford United, and partly to make way for Courtenay's preferred manager, Roddy Collins.

== Results & fixtures ==
=== Third Division ===
==== League table ====
| Pos | Team | Pld | W | D | L | GF | GA | GD | Pts | Qualification or relegation |
|---|---|---|---|---|---|---|---|---|---|---|
| 20 | Darlington | 46 | 12 | 13 | 21 | 44 | 56 | −12 | 49 | |
| 21 | Torquay United | 46 | 12 | 13 | 21 | 52 | 77 | −25 | 49 | |
| 22 | Carlisle United | 46 | 11 | 15 | 20 | 42 | 65 | −23 | 48 | |
| 23 | Halifax Town | 46 | 12 | 11 | 23 | 54 | 68 | −14 | 47 | |
| 24 | Barnet (R) | 46 | 12 | 9 | 25 | 67 | 81 | −14 | 45 | Relegation to Football Conference |

Rules for classification: 1) Points; 2) Goal difference; 3) Goals scored
(R) Relegated

==== Matches ====
| Match Day | Date | Opponent | H/A | Score | Carlisle United Scorer(s) | Attendance | Report |
|---|---|---|---|---|---|---|---|
| 1 | 12 August | Halifax Town | H | 2–2 | | | |
| 2 | 19 August | Leyton Orient | A | 0–1 | | | |
| 3 | 25 August | York City | H | 1–1 | | | |
| 4 | 29 August | Shrewsbury Town | A | 1–0 | | | |
| 5 | 2 September | Kidderminster Harriers | A | 1–0 | | | |
| 6 | 9 September | Rochdale | H | 1–2 | | | |
| 7 | 12 September | Chesterfield | H | 2–4 | | | |
| 8 | 16 September | Plymouth Argyle | A | 0–2 | | | |
| 9 | 23 September | Exeter City | H | 0–1 | | | |
| 10 | 30 September | Darlington | A | 0–1 | | | |
| 11 | 6 October | Cheltenham Town | A | 0–1 | | | |
| 12 | 14 October | Barnet | H | 0–2 | | | |
| 13 | 17 October | Cardiff City | H | 2–2 | | | |
| 14 | 21 October | Torquay United | A | 2–4 | | | |
| 15 | 24 October | Blackpool | A | 2–3 | | | |
| 16 | 28 October | Scunthorpe United | H | 1–2 | | | |
| 17 | 4 November | Brighton and Hove Albion | A | 1–4 | | | |
| 18 | 11 November | Southend United | H | 3–1 | | | |
| 19 | 25 November | Hull City | A | 1–2 | | | |
| 20 | 2 December | Lincoln City | H | 1–1 | | | |
| 21 | 16 December | Macclesfield Town | A | 0–1 | | | |
| 22 | 22 December | Mansfield Town | A | 1–1 | | | |
| 23 | 13 January | Shrewsbury Town | H | 1–0 | | | |
| 24 | 20 January | Hartlepool United | A | 2–2 | | | |
| 25 | 27 January | Mansfield Town | H | 2–1 | | | |
| 26 | 30 January | York City | A | 0–0 | | | |
| 27 | 3 February | Kiddermister Harriers | H | 2–0 | | | |
| 28 | 13 February | Hartlepool United | H | 2–3 | | | |
| 29 | 17 February | Plymouth Argyle | H | 1–1 | | | |
| 30 | 20 February | Chesterfield | A | 1–1 | | | |
| 31 | 24 February | Exeter City | A | 0–1 | | | |
| 32 | 3 March | Darlington | H | 0–2 | | | |
| 33 | 6 March | Barnet | A | 1–0 | | | |
| 34 | 10 March | Cheltenham Town | H | 1–1 | | | |
| 35 | 13 March | Leyton Orient | H | 1–0 | | | |
| 36 | 17 March | Cardiff City | A | 1–4 | | | |
| 37 | 23 March | Torquay United | H | 1–0 | | | |
| 38 | 27 March | Halifax Town | A | 0–0 | | | |
| 39 | 31 March | Macclesfield Town | H | 1–0 | | | |
| 40 | 10 April | Rochdale | A | 0–6 | | | |
| 41 | 14 April | Blackpool | H | 1–0 | | | |
| 42 | 16 April | Scunthorpe United | A | 0–3 | | | |
| 43 | 21 April | Brighton and Hove Albion | H | 0–0 | | | |
| 44 | 28 April | Southend United | A | 1–1 | | | |
| 45 | 2 May | Lincoln City | A | 1–1 | | | |
| 46 | 5 May | Hull City | H | 0–0 | | | |

=== English League Cup ===
| Round | Date | Opponent | H/A | Score | Carlisle United Scorer(s) | Attendance | Report |
|---|---|---|---|---|---|---|---|
| R1 L1 | 22 August | Grimsby Town | A | 0–2 | | 1,914 | |
| R1 L2 | 5 September | Grimsby Town | H | 1–1 | | 2,228 | |

=== FA Cup ===
| Round | Date | Opponent | H/A | Score | Carlisle United Scorer(s) | Attendance | Report |
|---|---|---|---|---|---|---|---|
| R1 | 18 November | Woking | H | 5–1 | | 2,647 | |
| R2 | 9 December | Kidderminster Harriers | A | 2–0 | | 2,533 | |
| R3 | 6 January | Arsenal | H | 0–1 | | 15,300 | |

=== Football League Trophy ===
| Round | Date | Opponent | H/A | Score | Carlisle United Scorer(s) | Attendance | Report |
|---|---|---|---|---|---|---|---|
| 1 | 12 December | Kidderminster Harriers | A | 1–2 | | 777 | |
