= Michael Price (footballer, born 1982) =

Welsh footballer

Personal information
- Date of birth: 29 April 1982 (age 44)
- Place of birth: Wrexham, Wales
- Position: Defender

Youth career
- 2000–2001: Everton

Senior career*
Years	Team	Apps	(Gls)
2001–2002	Hull City	4	(0)
2002	→ North Ferriby United (loan)		
2002	→ Barnet (loan)	4	(0)
2003–2004	Scarborough	23	(1)
2004–2005	Leigh RMI		
2005–2008	North Ferriby United		
- * Club domestic league appearances and goals

Michael Price (born 29 April 1982) is a Welsh former footballer who played in the Football League for Hull City.
