= Lawrie Dudfield =

English footballer (born 1980)

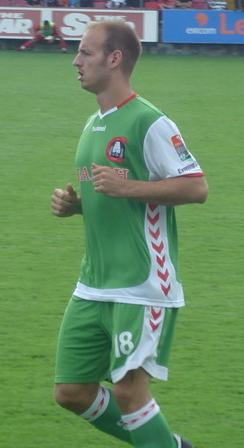
- Dudfield with Cork City

Personal information
- Full name: Lawrie George Dudfield
- Date of birth: 7 May 1980 (age 46)
- Place of birth: Southwark, England
- Position: Striker

Senior career*
Years	Team	Apps	(Gls)
1997–1998	Kettering Town	14	(1)
1998–2001	Leicester City	2	(0)
2000	→ Lincoln City (loan)	3	(0)
2000–2001	→ Chesterfield (loan)	14	(5)
2001–2003	Hull City	59	(17)
2003	→ Northampton Town (loan)	10	(1)
2003–2004	Northampton Town	19	(7)
2004	→ Southend United (loan)	13	(5)
2004–2005	Southend United	36	(9)
2005	Northampton Town	6	(1)
2005–2006	Boston United	26	(7)
2006–2008	Notts County	74	(17)
2008	Cork City	12	(7)
2015	Hull United	1	(0)
Total		286	(80)

Managerial career
- 2011–2012: Quorn
- * Club domestic league appearances and goals

Lawrie George Dudfield (born 7 May 1980) is an English football coach and former professional player.

He played as a striker, making over 300 appearances, most notably in the Premier League for Leicester City and in the Football League for Lincoln City, Chesterfield, Hull City, Northampton Town, Southend United, Boston United and Notts County. He also had spells in Ireland with Cork City and in non-league football with Kettering Town.

Following his retirement he had a spell as manager of Quorn as well as launching Iconz Experience, a company specializing in UK Soccer Tours and EPL Soccer Clinics featuring many current and former professional footballers. Following the success of Iconz Experience, Dudfield now resides in Saint Petersburg, Florida.

== Playing career ==
=== Leicester City ===
Dudfield started his career at Kettering Town, where, at 16 years and 2 months, he became the youngest player to play in the Conference National in August 1996. After making 14 appearances in all competitions, including three starts, Dudfield was signed by Leicester City on his 17th birthday. He spent four years working his way up from being the top scorer in the youth and reserve teams in the first two years before making his Premier League debut in April 2000 at home to Everton as a replacement for Tony Cottee. He went on to make two appearances in the Premier League and was named on the substitutes bench a further eleven times in his breakthrough season. On 15 September 2000, Dudfield joined Lincoln City on a month's loan for further experience, making his Football League debut for the club in the 1–1 home draw with Blackpool the following day. Following this experience he starred on loan for Chesterfield, scoring five goals in fourteen appearances as the club were successfully promoted as Division Three champions.

=== Hull City ===
Chesterfield were keen to secure a permanent transfer for Dudfield following his successful loan spell. However, due to the reputation he was forming for himself, other clubs came in for him. In June 2001 Hull City broke their transfer record to bring Dudfield to the club by signing him for over £250,000. He spent two successful seasons at Hull City, playing 59 times, scoring 17 goals and becoming a firm fans' favourite, so much so that he still regularly guests on local sports shows in the area as well as occasionally taking up co-commentary duty on Hull City's EPL and EFL games for BBC Radio Humberside. In the 2001/2002 season Dudfield's performances earned him the annual Supporters Club Player of the Year Award.

=== Northampton Town ===
Dudfield fell out of favour with New Hull City manager Peter Taylor, who had coincidentally sold him to Hull from Leicester, and was sent out on loan to Northampton Town, who liked what they saw and signed him for a fee of £25,000. He spent one season at Northampton, playing 32 games and scoring seven goals. He then made the move to Southend United on loan following the appointment of Colin Calderwood as the new manager.

=== Southend United ===
Dudfield hit the ground running immediately on loan with his new club, scoring 5 goals in his loan spell, 3 of them match winning goals, as his goals helped fire Southend United up from the bottom of League 2 to mid-table safety. Following the conclusion of his loan spell, Dudfield made known his desire to stay with the club and subsequently turned down more attractive offers from clubs including Yeovil Town, Peterborough United and Luton Town in order to remain at the club. It proved to be a wise decision as during his spell at Southend United he became a firm fans' favourite as the club were promoted to League 1 via a win over Lincoln City in the League 2 Play Off Final at the Millennium Stadium. Dudfield would in fact appear in three major finals at the Millennium Stadium (staged there as the new Wembley Stadium was being built) for Southend United during his spell at the club, with Southend United also reaching consecutive LDV Finals. Following promotion to League 1 it was expected that Dudfield would remain at the club; however, he had a disagreement with owner Ron Martin, who he felt had reneged on his word to offer him a new improved contract, and left the club "out of principle", stating that he was a "man of his word" and expected the same in return. Dudfield left the club immediately after promotion, despite Martin expecting him to return for pre-season, and never returned to the club.

=== Notts County ===
His contract situation saw him make appearances for Boston United before Notts County signed Dudfield in the summer of 2006. He signed a two-year contract, which kept him there until the summer of 2008. During his two-year spell at the club, Dudfield relaunched his career showing his versatility by playing centre forward, right midfield and left wing as he played 74 games for the Magpies, scoring on 17 occasions. In the 2006–07 season Dudfield formed an impressive partnership with Jason Lee as the strikers scored 35 goals between them. His form earned him a Player of the Year nomination. In 2007–08 Dudfield was used as the main striker for the new management team and was a mainstay of the team, often playing as a sole striker. Following the end of the season Dudfield announced he was leaving the club to seek new opportunities.

=== Cork City ===
On 25 July 2008, Dudfield signed a contract with League of Ireland side Cork City, having impressed manager Alan Mathews during a training period at the club. Dudfield scored several important goals for the club in the last couple of months of the 2008 season, and featured in the UEFA Cup and Setanta Sports Cup final, in which they beat Glentoran 2–1 to win the competition for the first time. Dudfield then decided to return home, turning down the offer of a new two-year deal, in order to retire from football due to the troublesome knee injury that had continued to take its toll.

== Coaching career ==
In September 2011, Dudfield was appointed as first team manager at non-league Quorn of the Evo-Stik League, who under their previous manager had lost the first nine games of the season. He held the position for several months taking the club off the bottom of the league, including wins against eventual champions Ilkeston, before leaving a month before the end of the 2011/12 season. Quorn remains Dudfield's only coaching role to date despite being linked with a number of coaching roles at professional clubs, most notably Notts County.

Following his move to the United States, Dudfield is now the Head Coach of Iconz Elite, where players train and play in high level International and National events as well as involving International and Premier League players as mentors in the program.

== Personal life ==
Upon his retirement from full-time professional football in 2009, Dudfield began employment at Nottingham Forest and worked in various roles through to his departure in May 2015.

In early 2015 Dudfield launched his own company, Iconz Experience, focussing on UK Soccer Tours, as well as hosting EPL Soccer Clinics abroad. Specialising in using former Premier League footballers as the main attraction, Iconz Experience exhibited at the 2013 Soccerex Festival in Rio de Janeiro with a host of international household names including Ruud Gullit, Aron Winter and Gaizka Mendieta. On 1 June 2015, Iconz Experience signed an official partnership agreement with Nottingham Forest to exclusively host all Nottingham Forest UK Soccer Tours from countries such as the U.S., Australia and various other countries.

During this period Iconz Experience has grown to become leaders in the UK Soccer Tour market and has reported continued annual growth. In 2015 and 2018 Iconz Experience was the subject of takeover offers from within the industry however Dudfield chose to turn down all offers and continued to focus on the companies growth.

Since 2015, former Leicester City, Fulham and Brighton manager Micky Adams has been the official ambassador for Iconz Experience, and coaches, including former Watford Academy Manager and Wales National Women's assistant coach Richard Thomas, ex-Manchester United goalkeeper Roy Carroll and Crystal Palace assistant coach Shaun Derry have all been linked with hands on roles at the company.

== Honours ==
Chesterfield

- Football League Third Division promotion: 2000–01

Southend United

- Football League Two play-offs: 2005
- Football League Trophy runner-up: 2004–05

Cork City

- Setanta Sports Cup: 2008
