= Matt Bloomer =

English footballer (born 1978)

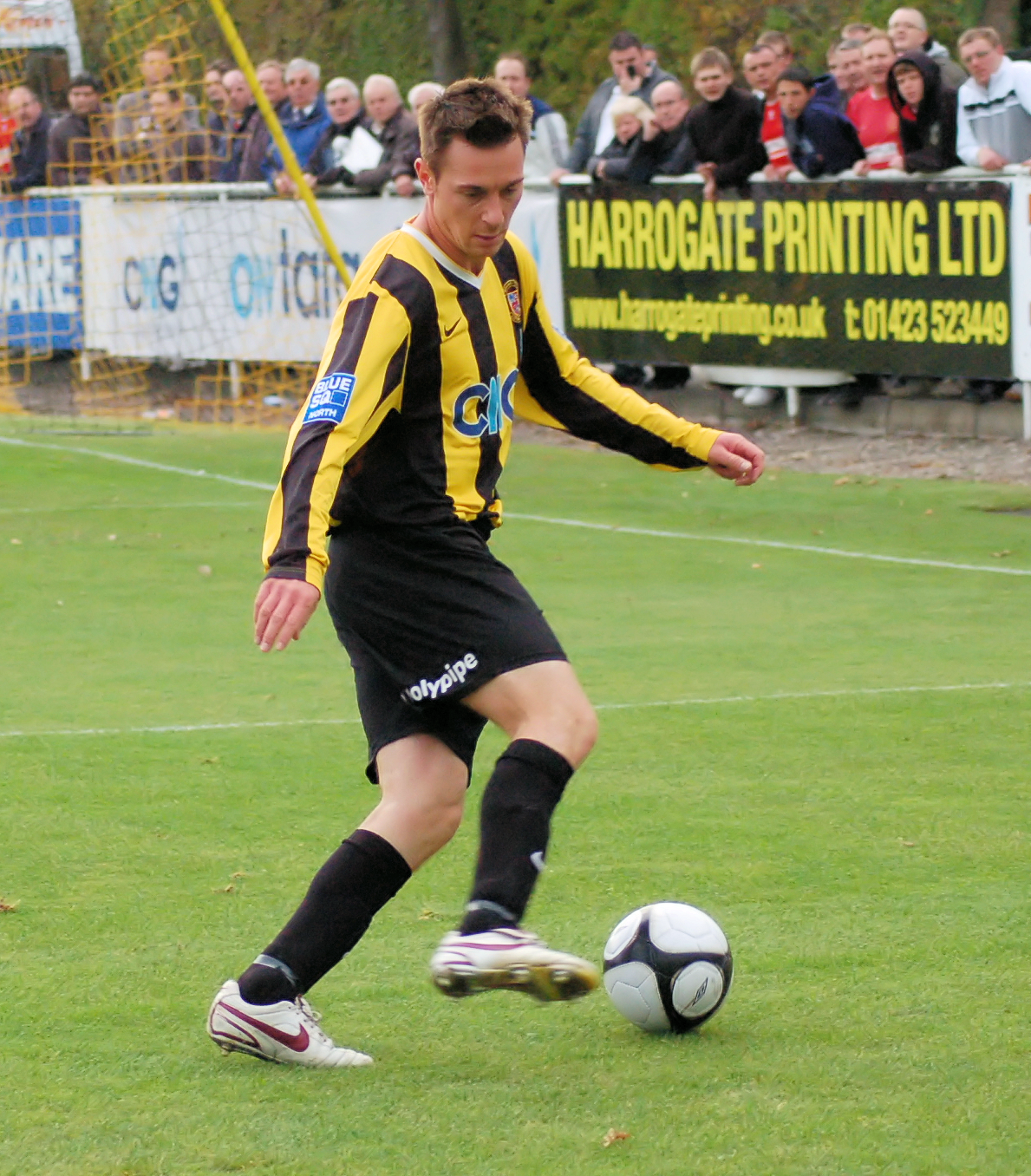
- Bloomer playing for Harrogate in 2010

Personal information
- Full name: Matthew Brian Bloomer
- Date of birth: 3 November 1978 (age 47)
- Place of birth: Grimsby, England
- Height: 6 ft 0 in (1.83 m)
- Position: Defender

Youth career
- 1993–1997: Grimsby Town

Senior career*
Years	Team	Apps	(Gls)
1997–2001	Grimsby Town	12	(0)
2001–2003	Hull City	3	(0)
2002	→ Lincoln City (loan)	5	(0)
2002	→ Telford United (loan)	13	(0)
2003–2006	Lincoln City	89	(3)
2006	→ Grimsby Town (loan)	3	(0)
2006	→ Cambridge United (loan)	8	(0)
2006–2007	Cambridge United	17	(0)
2007	Grimsby Town	9	(0)
2007–2009	Boston United	40	(0)
2009–2016	Harrogate Town	232	(2)
2016–2019	Cleethorpes Town	76	(2)
2021–2022	Cleethorpes Town	0	(0)
Total		507	(7)
- * Club domestic league appearances and goals as of 15:18, 26 March 2016 (UTC)

Matthew Brian Bloomer (born 3 November 1978) is an English football coach and former professional footballer.

Bloomer played as a defender from 1997 to 2019, notably having three separate spells with his home town club Grimsby Town, having also played for Hull City, Lincoln City, Telford United, Cambridge United, Boston United and Harrogate Town and Cleethorpes Town.

== Playing career ==
=== Grimsby Town ===
Bloomer started his career as a trainee with his home town club of Grimsby Town, but failed to make an impact, starting only three games in his four years under contract. He was brought up in a youth team that consisted the likes of Jack Lester, John Oster, Danny Butterfield and Daryl Clare, and under the stewardship of long serving manager Alan Buckley. Bloomer was released by the club's new manager Lennie Lawrence at the end of the 2000–01 campaign.

=== Hull City ===
Upon his release from Blundell Park, Bloomer dropped down two league's to sign for Hull City, where he also struggled, making just three appearances in the league in two years, all of them off the bench. In 2002, Alan Buckley's Lincoln City, who were facing relegation from Division Three signed Bloomer on a month-long loan. He turned in a series of impressive displays at centre back which helped keep Lincoln in the Football League.

=== Lincoln City ===
The following season, Keith Alexander succeeded Alan Buckley as manager, and brought Bloomer in on a permanent deal. After signing permanently for Lincoln he was mainly a bit-part player, but nonetheless made nearly a century of appearances for the club. During the 2004–2005 season, he earned himself a starting place at right-back, replacing veteran Dean West. Bloomer was given his chance to start ahead of West for the League Cup first round match against Derby County. Lincoln won 3–1, Bloomer's performance was highly praised, and he went on to make a number of solid performances. He lost his starting place following an ill-fated first half against Wycombe Wanderers in early 2005. Bloomer moved from right back to central defensive position held by captain Paul Morgan, who was out with an injury, Wycombe scored three goals in the first 45 minutes, all from Nathan Tyson. He did not start again all season, with both Lee Beevers and Gareth McAuley playing in his position for the rest of the year, however, he did play as a striker in the play-off final in Cardiff, where Lincoln lost 2–0 after extra-time to Southend United. During the 2005–06 season, Bloomer found himself on the fringes of the Lincoln squad, and had spells on loan at former club Grimsby Town and Conference side Cambridge United.

=== Cambridge United ===
Bloomer signed for Cambridge permanently in July 2006, and made 18 first team appearances. However, he only had a short lived spell at the struggling Conference club, and he had his contract cancelled on 31 January 2007.

=== Return to Grimsby Town ===
Following his release from Cambridge, Alan Buckley tempted Bloomer into returning to his home town and he rejoined Grimsby Town until the end of the 2006–07 season. After playing only a cameo role in the end of the club's season, Buckley released Bloomer four months later.

=== Boston United ===
He went on trial with York City at the end of the 2006–07 season following his release by Grimsby, but York confirmed they would not be offering Bloomer a contract after did not turn up to training, and had also gone to play for Halifax Town for a pre-season friendly. However, he eventually signed for Conference North side Boston United. Despite Boston's financial trouble, Bloomer stayed on even though the club were demoted two years in a row for financial irregularities. Despite being offered a new but reduced contract for the 2009–10 season, Bloomer was eventually released by Boston on 1 June 2009.

=== Harrogate Town ===
Less than two weeks after his release from Boston United, Bloomer agreed to join Harrogate Town, who were managed by his former Lincoln City teammate Simon Weaver. Despite finishing bottom of the Conference North with Harrogate Town, Bloomer managed to make a total of 44 appearances. He left Harrogate in January 2016 midway through his fifth season with the club.

=== Cleethorpes Town ===
In January 2016 Bloomer joined Cleethorpes Town on a free transfer.

== Coaching career ==
In 2018, Bloomer was appointed assistant manager at Cleethorpes. Bloomer registered as a player again during the 2021–22 season.

== Personal life ==
Bloomer is a third generation professional footballer. His father, Brian played in the Football League for Scunthorpe United while Brian's father, Jimmy played for Grimsby Town as well as Matt's old club Boston United. Matt's uncle, Jimmy Bloomer Jr also played for Grimsby Town.

== Honours ==
Grimsby Town

- Second Division play-off: 1997–98
- Football League Trophy: 1997–98

Lincoln City

- Third Division play-off runner-up: 2002–03
- Football League Two play-off runner-up: 2004–05
