= Lee Philpott =

English footballer, manager, and agent

Personal information
- Full name: Lee Philpott
- Date of birth: 21 February 1970 (age 56)
- Place of birth: Barnet, England
- Height: 5 ft 11 in (1.80 m)
- Position: Midfielder

Youth career
- 1982–1986: Luton Town

Senior career*
Years	Team	Apps	(Gls)
1986–1989	Peterborough United	7	(0)
1989–1992	Cambridge United	178	(23)
1992–1996	Leicester City	91	(3)
1996–1998	Blackpool	82	(6)
1998–2000	Lincoln City	57	(3)
2000–2003	Hull City	60	(2)
2003–2004	Weymouth	75	(5)
2004–2007	Harrogate Town	82	(2)
2007–2008	Hinckley United	10	(1)
Total		642	(34)

Managerial career
- 2005: Harrogate Town (caretaker)
- * Club domestic league appearances and goals

Lee Philpott (born 21 February 1970) is a FIFA Licensed Football Agent and former professional footballer.

He played as a midfielder and left winger notably played in the Premier League for Leicester City, he also played in the Football League with Peterborough United, Cambridge United, Blackpool, Lincoln City and Hull City, before finishing his career in Non-league football with Weymouth, Harrogate Town and Hinckley United. During his career he made almost 500 league and cup appearances.

== Playing career ==
Philpott began his career with Peterborough United as an apprentice in 1986. In 1989, he joined Cambridge United and made 178 appearances for the U's, scoring 23 goals, helping the club to two successive promotions and two FA Cup Quarter Finals.

The biggest move of Philpott's career occurred in 1992 when he was signed by Leicester City for £350,000. In four years at Filbert Street he made 91 appearances, finding the net on three occasions. Philpott joined Blackpool in 1996 for £75,000, for whom he went on to make 82 appearances and score five goals in his two years with the Seasiders.

In 1998, Philpott joined Lincoln City on a free transfer. Two years later, he was on the move again, this time to Hull City signing a three-year contract until 2003. The midfielder moved into non-league football with Weymouth in 2003. He spent one year with the Terras, before joining Harrogate Town, where he also became player/assistant manager. He was also caretaker manager for a spell in February 2005. Signed as a player for Hinckley United in July 2007 and after sustaining a recurrent injury retired from football the following season to practice as a licensed football agent.

== Football agent ==
Lee founded LPM Football Agents in May 2008 and heads a team of agents based across the UK and in 2024 became a partner at Game Changer Football Agency.

== Honours ==
Cambridge United

- Football League Third Division: 1990–91
- Football League Fourth Division play-offs: 1990
