= Ryan Williams (footballer, born 1978) =

Personal information
- Full name: Ryan Neil Williams
- Date of birth: 31 August 1978 (age 48)
- Place of birth: Sutton-in-Ashfield, England
- Height: 5 ft 5 in (1.65 m)
- Position: Midfielder

Youth career
- Mansfield Town

Senior career*
Years	Team	Apps	(Gls)
1995–1997	Mansfield Town	26	(3)
1997–1999	Tranmere Rovers	5	(0)
1999–2001	Chesterfield	74	(13)
2001–2003	Hull City	52	(2)
2003–2006	Bristol Rovers	43	(4)
2004–2005	→ Forest Green Rovers (loan)	6	(1)
2005–2006	→ Aldershot Town (loan)	25	(7)
2006–2008	Aldershot Town	47	(9)
2008–2009	Weymouth	31	(2)
2009–2011	Mansfield Town	41	(3)
2010	→ Gainsborough Trinity (loan)	6	(0)
2011–2012	Gainsborough Trinity	68	(9)
2012–2013	North Ferriby United^{1}	33	(8)
2013	Gainsborough Trinity	0	(0)
2013–2014	Scarborough Athletic		
2014–	AFC Mansfield		
2018–2019	East Yorkshire Carnegie		
2019–2020	Hall Road Rangers		

International career
1996	England U18	1	(0)
- * Club domestic league appearances and goals as of 16:52, 26 January 2012 (UTC)

Ryan Neil Williams (born 31 August 1978) is an English former professional footballer who played as a midfielder.

He notably played in the Football League with lengthy spells at Chesterfield, Hull City and Bristol Rovers, having also appeared professionally for Mansfield Town, Tranmere Rovers and Aldershot Town. He also played Non-League football for Forest Green Rovers, Weymouth, Gainsborough Trinity, North Ferriby United, Scarborough Athletic, AFC Mansfield, East Yorkshire Carnegie and Hall Road Rangers.

== Career ==
Williams started his career with a local club, Mansfield Town before moving to Tranmere Rovers, Chesterfield, Hull City and then onto Bristol Rovers.

After playing for three seasons in League Two, he joined Aldershot Town on a month's loan in September 2005 when Ian Atkins was manager at Bristol Rovers. After Atkins departed the club, Williams briefly returned to Rovers before leaving the club in December 2005 and joining the Shots on a contract that ran until the end of the 2007–08 season. In a pre-season friendly against Crystal Palace in July 2007, Williams tore his anterior cruciate ligament. He was only able to play one game in the 2007–08 season, as Aldershot won the Conference with a record points total. Following their promotion, Williams left by mutual agreement.

On 6 May 2008, Williams joined another Conference club, Weymouth, signing a one-year contract. In 2009, he joined Mansfield Town.

Following a loan spell with Conference North side Gainsborough Trinity in December 2010, he joined the club on a permanent basis in January 2011. In September 2012 he joined North Ferriby United. Williams and Ferriby secured promotion to the Conference North at the end of the 2012–13 season, and on 26 May 2013 he announced he had re-signed for Trinity.

After starting several games and assisting on the coaching staff, Williams moved to Scarborough Athletic in September 2013 after work commitments meant he couldn't continue playing at Conference North level.

Williams stayed with the Seadogs until December 2014, when he completed a move to AFC Mansfield, joining former boss Rudy Funk and returning to the town where he began his career.

== Notes ==
1. Soccerbase incorrectly credits Williams with the stats of Morecambe player Ryan Williams. Therefore, until and unless the correct it, editors should ignore the Morecambe appearances and goals added to this players Soccerbase page.
