= Steve Torpey =

Steve Torpey may refer to:

- Steve Torpey (footballer, born 1970), former Swansea City and Scunthorpe United player, currently coaching at York City
- Steve Torpey (footballer, born 1981), former Liverpool, Port Vale and F.C. United of Manchester player
