= Paul Donnelly =

Paul Donnelly may refer to:

- Paul Donnelly (footballer) (born 1981), English association football player
- Paul Donnelly (politician), Irish Sinn Féin politician for Dublin West
- Paul C. Donnelly (1923–2014), American NASA official
