= Danny Maye =

English footballer (born 1982)

Personal information
- Full name: Daniel Peter Christopher Maye
- Date of birth: 14 July 1982 (age 44)
- Place of birth: Leicester, England
- Height: 5 ft 9 in (1.75 m)
- Position: Midfielder

Youth career
- 1998–2001: Port Vale

Senior career*
Years	Team	Apps	(Gls)
2001–2002	Port Vale	2	(0)
2002	Southend United	2	(0)
2002	Nuneaton Borough	0	(0)
2002–2003	Corby Town		
2003–2006	Team Bath		
2006	Chippenham Town		
2006–2007	Taunton Town		
2007–2011	Yate Town		
2011–2013	Bristol Manor Farm		
- * Club domestic league appearances and goals

Daniel Peter Christopher Maye (born 14 July 1982) is an English former professional footballer who now works as a football coach at EFL Championship club Derby County.

== Playing career ==
=== Port Vale ===
Maye started his career with Second Division Port Vale, making his debut as a 67th minute substitute in a 5–0 win over Cambridge United at Vale Park on 5 October 2001, replacing Ian Armstrong. Eleven days later, he played the second half of the Football League Trophy clash with Carlisle United, replacing fellow youngster Alex Gibson. Vale scored twice in six minutes to turn the game around 2–1. His final appearance was on 6 April 2002, replacing Marc Bridge-Wilkinson with eight minutes to go of a goalless home draw with Bournemouth.

=== Southend United ===
He joined Southend United on a free transfer for the start of the 2002–03 season. He made his debut for the Third Division club on 17 August 2002, replacing Phil Whelan late into a 3–2 defeat to Shrewsbury Town at Roots Hall. His next match was in the League Cup first round on 10 September, coming on for Damon Searle with the score 3–0 to Wimbledon, the score at full-time was 4–1. He played his last game seven days later, again coming off the bench, this time replacing Neil Jenkins, in another home defeat, Kidderminster Harriers claiming a 2–1 victory. He left the club once his three-month contract expired.

=== Non-League ===
Late in 2002, he joined Conference side Nuneaton Borough before quickly moving on to Corby Town. In 2003, he joined Team Bath, staying for three years; he completed a degree program with the affiliated university – a degree in Coach Education Sports Development from the University of Bath. He spent part of 2006 with Chippenham Town before signing with Taunton Town. In 2007, he joined Yate Town whilst working as a teacher at a Bath Secondary School before moving on to Bristol Manor Farm.

== Coaching career ==
Maye was appointed as a coach at the Bristol Rovers academy. In December 2012, he joined the coaching staff at Southampton and went on to obtain his UEFA A Licence and by 2019 was working as 'Lead Youth Phase Coach' at the club's academy.

In August 2023, after 12 years working at Southampton, Maye joined the coaching staff at Derby County's academy, taking up the role of lead under-18 coach. In June 2025, Maye was promoted to the role of Senior Professional Development Phase Coach, in this new role he was appointed as manager of the clubs under-21 team.

== Career statistics ==
Appearances and goals by club, season and competition
Club	Season	League			FA Cup		Other		Total	
Club	Season	Division	Apps	Goals	Apps	Goals	Apps	Goals	Apps	Goals
Port Vale	2001–02	Second Division	2	0	0	0	1	0	3	0
Southend United	2002–03	Third Division	2	0	0	0	1	0	3	0
Nuneaton Borough	2002–03	Conference	0	0	0	0	0	0	0	0
