= Ashley Dodd =

English footballer

Personal information
- Full name: Ashley Michael Dodd
- Date of birth: 7 January 1982 (age 44)
- Place of birth: Stafford, England
- Height: 5 ft 10 in (1.78 m)
- Position: Midfielder

Youth career
- Manchester United

Senior career*
| Years | Team | Apps | (Gls) |
| 2000–2001 | Manchester United | 0 | (0) |
| 2001 | → Port Vale (loan) | 3 | (0) |
| 2001–2002 | Port Vale | 9 | (1) |
| 2002–2003 | Moor Green | | |
| 2003 | Stafford Rangers | | |
| 2003–2004 | Hednesford Town | 25 | (0) |
| 2004–2005 | Gresley Rovers | 53 | (6) |
- * Club domestic league appearances and goals

Ashley Michael Dodd (born 7 January 1982) is an English former professional footballer who played as a midfielder. He played in 16 games for Port Vale in the Football League in the 2000–01 and 2001–02 seasons. A former Manchester United youngster, he later played for non-League sides Moor Green, Stafford Rangers, Hednesford Town and Gresley Rovers.

== Career ==
Dodd started his career with Premier League club Manchester United, but in March 2001 he was loaned out to Port Vale in the Second Division. After impressing at Vale the move was made permanent two months later. Signing a one-year contract in May 2001, he scored one goal in 13 games, appearing fairly regularly in the first half of the 2001–02 season. However, he did not play a game in the 2002 end of the season and was released in April 2002. He went from Moor Green to Stafford Rangers in August 2002 and signed for Hednesford Town in 2003. He made his full debut for the "Pitmen" on 9 September 2003, in a 1–1 draw away at Grantham Town. He ended the 2003–04 season with 16 starts and eight substitute appearances. He moved to Gresley Rovers in 2004 but left the club in May 2005 after scoring six times in 53 appearances. In June 2009 he joined St Peter, who play in the Channel Islands.

== Career statistics ==
Appearances and goals by club, season and competition
| Club | Season | League | | | FA Cup | | Other | | Total | |
| Club | Season | Division | Apps | Goals | Apps | Goals | Apps | Goals | Apps | Goals |
|---|---|---|---|---|---|---|---|---|---|---|
| Port Vale (loan) | 2000–01 | Second Division | 3 | 0 | — | | — | | 3 | 0 |
| Port Vale | 2001–02 | Second Division | 9 | 1 | 2 | 0 | 2 | 0 | 13 | 1 |
| Port Vale | Total | | 12 | 1 | 2 | 0 | 2 | 0 | 16 | 1 |
| Hednesford Town | 2002–03 | Southern League Premier Division | | | | | | | 1 | 0 |
| Hednesford Town | 2003–04 | Southern League Premier Division | | | | | | | 24 | 0 |
| Hednesford Town | Total | | | | | | | | 25 | 0 |
| Gresley Rovers | 2005–06 | Northern Premier League Division One | | | | | | | 53 | 6 |
