= Richard Burgess (footballer) =

English footballer (born 1974)

Personal information
- Full name: Richard Daniel Burgess
- Date of birth: 1 August 1974 (age 52)
- Place of birth: Stourport-on-Severn, England
- Height: 5 ft 8 in (1.73 m)
- Position: Forward

Youth career
- 1993–1995: Aston Villa

Senior career*
Years	Team	Apps	(Gls)
1995–1997	Aston Villa	0	(0)
1997–2000	Stoke City	0	(0)
2000	→ Kidderminster Harriers (loan)	3	(0)
2000	→ Worcester City (loan)		
2000–2001	Bromsgrove Rovers	25	(7)
2001–2002	Port Vale	3	(0)
2002	Nuneaton Borough	6	(0)
2002–2003	Bromsgrove Rovers	42	(13)
2003–2004	Redditch United		
2004–2005	Halesowen Town		
2005	Bromsgrove Rovers	2	(0)
2005–2006	Stourport Swifts		
2006–2007	Bromsgrove Rovers	7	(1)
2007–2009	Stourport Swifts		
2007	→ Bewdley Town (loan)		
2009–2013	Bewdley Town		
2013–2014	Bromyard Town		
Total		88	(21)

International career
1995	England U16		
- * Club domestic league appearances and goals

Richard Daniel Burgess (born 1 August 1974) is an English former footballer who played as a forward.

He spent the 1990s with Aston Villa and Stoke City, though he did not make a first-team appearance. He had brief loan spells at Kidderminster Harriers and Worcester City in the second half of the 1999–2000 season before joining Southern League Division One West team Bromsgrove Rovers. He returned to the English Football League with Port Vale in April 2001. He failed to make an impression and was allowed to return to the non-League scene with Nuneaton Borough in January 2002. He went back to Bromsgrove Rovers for the 2002–03 season. He later had spells with Redditch United, Halesowen Town, Stourport Swifts, Bewdley Town and Bromyard Town. He helped Redditch to win the Southern League Division One West title in 2003–04.

== Career ==
Burgess started his career as an associated schoolboy with Aston Villa, but left for Stoke City in 1997 without having played a first-team game for the "Villans". He had a loan at nearby Kidderminster Harriers in February 2000, making three substitute appearances. On 1 April 2000, he joined Southern League Premier Division side Worcester City on loan until the end of the season as manager John Barton wanted "more options up front".

After being released by the "Potters", he joined Bromsgrove Rovers. In November 2000, he had a week-long trial at Northampton Town. He was scouted by many other clubs. He signed for Second Division club Port Vale in April 2001. He scored his first goal in an FA Cup first round 3–0 win over Aylesbury United on 17 November 2001. However, he made just three league appearances that season and left on a free transfer in January 2002 to sign for non-League Nuneaton Borough. He was released at the end of the 2001–02 season.

He went on to rejoin Bromsgrove Rovers; Redditch United attempted to sign Burgess in November 2002 but were turned down by Bromsgrove. He eventually did get his move to Redditch United. He later represented Halesowen Town before he again returned to Bromsgrove Rovers. During his time at Redditch United he helped the club win promotion as champions of the Southern League Division One West in 2003–04. He signed with Stourport Swifts in January 2005, and scored a brace on his debut in a 2–1 victory over Bedworth United. He joined Bromsgrove Rovers for the fourth time in his career in May 2006.

He started the 2007–08 season on loan at West Midlands League Premier Division side Bewdley Town. He joined the club permanently, staying until July 2013, when he left the club after joint-manager Craig Payton admitted he could no longer guarantee him first-team football. He spent the 2013–14 season with Bromyard Town. He won the Worcestershire Senior Urn with Bewdley in 2011 and 2012.

== Career statistics ==
Appearances and goals by club, season and competition
Club	Season	League			Other		Total	
Club	Season	Division	Apps	Goals	Apps	Goals	Apps	Goals
Stoke City	1997–98	First Division	0	0	0	0	0	0
Stoke City	1998–99	Second Division	0	0	0	0	0	0
Stoke City	1999–2000	Second Division	0	0	0	0	0	0
Stoke City	Total		0	0	0	0	0	0
Kidderminster Harriers (loan)	1999–2000	Conference	3	0	0	0	3	0
Bromsgrove Rovers	2000–01	Southern League; Division One West	25	7	10	4	35	11
Port Vale	2000–01	Second Division	1	0	0	0	1	0
Port Vale	2001–02	Second Division	2	0	1	1	3	1
Port Vale	Total		3	0	1	1	4	1
Nuneaton Borough	2001–02	Conference	6	0	0	0	6	0
Bromsgrove Rovers	2002–03	Southern League; Western Division	42	13	10	2	52	15
Bromsgrove Rovers	2004–05	Southern League; Division One West	2	0	0	0	2	0
Bromsgrove Rovers	2006–07	Southern League; Division One Midlands	7	1	9	0	16	1
Career total (Note: Statistics for Worcester City, Redditch United, Halesowen Town, Stourport Swifts, Bewdley Town and Bromyard Town not recorded.)			88	21	30	7	118	28

== Honours ==
Redditch United

- Southern League Division One West: 2003–04

Bewdley Town

- Worcestershire Senior Urn: 2011 & 2012
