= Kirkby Ski Slope =

Artificial ski slope that never opened

Coordinates: 53.4751°N 2.9010°W

Kirkby Ski Slope was an artificial ski slope that was built in Kirkby, near Liverpool, England, in the 1970s. The ski slope never opened and was a source of considerable controversy around how it was built and funded.

== History ==
=== Kirkby ===
Kirkby grew from a small settlement of 3,000 people in 1951 to a town of 50,000 people in just ten years. From 1958, the town had been administered by Kirkby Urban District Council, but under the Local Government Act 1972 a new administrative area was due to be formed in 1974, known as the Metropolitan Borough of Knowsley.

Under council leader Dave Tempest, Kirkby Urban District Council wanted to spend any leftover money they had on a project before the new council was formed, and the idea of a dry ski slope was proposed by council architect Eric Spencer Stevenson.

=== Construction ===
The land chosen for the ski slope was between the M57 motorway and the (since demolished) Kirkby Stadium.

Work started on the 45-metre (148 ft) slope in November 1973, the contractor informing the President of the Council that the cost of constructing the ski slope would be £64,388. Later investigations would put the cost to the Council around £90,000. Local schoolchildren were asked to volunteer to help lay the artificial surface, but when there were not enough volunteers, the council ended up paying them 25p an hour to work at weekends.

A BBC Nationwide report from 16 October 1975 discussed concerns raised by some locals that the slope not only faced into the sun, but that it ran right to the shoulder of the A506 roundabout used by traffic entering and exiting the M57. The BBC report also pointed out that there was ample land in the other direction that could have been used instead if the slope was oriented in the opposite direction. After its completion, the council appropriated an additional £5,000 to sort out bumps that had appeared on the surface of the slope and to provide railings to stop skiers falling off the sides.

=== Problems ===
The slope had been scheduled to open in 1974, but in autumn 1975 the project was abandoned because of concerns that it was unsafe. No one had been allowed to ski on the slope as the council's insurers would not permit it, deeming it too dangerous. The Liverpool Echo reported in August 1975 on the slope, stating that bubbles had appeared in the artificial surface caused by thousands of tons of earth subsiding within the slope. Weeds were also beginning to protrude from the surface. The Echo claimed that the council had spent around £150,000 on the project by that point, in sharp contrast to the £12,000 nearby Wirral Council had spent in the construction of their ski slope at The Oval Sports Centre in Bebington. By December 1975, the Echo was reporting that an insurance company was refusing to insure properties close to the slope as they thought the slope posed a danger. The insurers were demanding that the height of the slope be reduced and daily checks be performed on it in the event of bad weather.

=== Dismantling ===
The artificial surface of the ski slope was removed and sold in 1976, though the remaining mound was left visible for several years before being fully removed.

=== Controversy ===
Journalists Steve Scott and Brian Whitaker of the investigative newspaper Liverpool Free Press spent considerable time looking into the circumstances of the ski slope. Printed between 1971 and 1977, the newspaper was run by young journalists who worked for the Liverpool Echo and were unsatisfied with the lack of serious investigative reporting at the paper. The investigation was started when Free Press received an anonymous letter, claiming to be from a Knowsley Council employee, who claimed that builder George Leatherbarrow had charged the council £25,000 for the earth for the slope but had not paid for it himself.

By November 1974, the Free Press had established that the earth had been sourced via an advert placed in the Liverpool Echo in December 1973, shortly after construction started. The advert offered: "Free tip in Kirkby for all suitable material". Borehole samples gathered by Knowsley Council would later show that the earth contained wood, bricks, colliery waste, sand and ashes – all of which would contribute to the subsidence already seen.

Investigations by the Free Press would also uncover that the slope was built on land the council did not own and over a mains water pipe. Knowsley Council later had to buy the land from Liverpool Council. Planning permission for the project was not granted until November 1973 despite an order for the artificial surface being placed in July of that year. As the investigations progressed, the Free Press found that:

- Tenders for work had been granted without the usual process being followed
- Leatherbarrow had completed most of the work on the slope before a contract with the council was signed

In addition, the paper discovered that Stevenson and Tempest had received trips and gifts, both in connection with the work given to George Leatherbarrow. Tempest and Stevenson had received extensions to their houses built by Letherbarrow's firm with materials that had come from a council estate being built in Kirkby by Leatherbarrow. The Free Press were also able to prove that Leatherbarrow had also gifted Stevenson an Alfa Romeo car.

Tempest lost his seat on the council and within a month the Free Post and BBC had both covered the story, leading to Stevenson being suspended. Stevenson resigned from his position at Knowsley Council in April 1976.

=== Aftermath ===
Tempest, who also served as a magistrate, was arrested in the summer of 1977. After police investigations, a trial for former council leader David Tempest, former council architect Eric Spencer Stevenson and builder George Leatherbarrow took place at Liverpool Crown Court in 1978. Presided over by Mr Justice Mars Jones, all three men pleaded not guilty to charges of conspiring together to commit corruption between January 1967 and April 1974.

Stevenson was jailed for three years in June 1978 for taking bribes for contracts; Leatherbarrow was jailed for four years for bribing Stevenson to win £10 million worth of contracts. Tempest was also found guilty and jailed. Leatherbarrow died in a road accident in Spain in November 1989, aged 69.

=== Site today ===
In 2006, the site was proposed as the location for the coach park for a new stadium for Everton FC, known as The Kirkby Project. This project failed to get off the ground and was cancelled in 2009. As of 2018, the site is the location of a housing estate.
