= Brian Whitaker =

British journalist

Brian Whitaker (sometimes credited as Brian Whittaker; born 13 June 1947) is a British journalist and writer.

Whitaker earned a degree in Arabic studies at the University of Westminster and Latin (BA Hons) at the University of Birmingham. He started work as a graduate journalist with the Liverpool Echo in 1968. During his time in Liverpool, he set up the Liverpool Free Press in 1971 with four other Echo journalists. The paper specialised in investigative journalism and stories the more mainstream media would not cover. The paper's investigative work led to a former council leader and former council architect being jailed for corruption over their involvement in the building of a dry ski slope in Kirkby. A former joint investigations editor of The Sunday Times, he left the title at the time of the Wapping dispute. For a period during 1987, he was editor of the short-lived News on Sunday tabloid. The newspaper published extracts from Spycatcher by Peter Wright in August 1987 while Whitaker was editor. The title was eventually fined £50,000 in May 1989 for contempt of court in breaking an injunction upheld by the Law Lords shortly before publication.

Whitaker worked for the British newspaper The Guardian from 1987 and was its Middle East editor from 2000 to 2007. He runs a personal, non-Guardian-related website, Al-Bab.com, about politics in the Arab world.

== Works ==
- News Limited: Why You Can't Read All About it, 1981 (London: Minority Press Group) ISBN 978-0-906890-03-5, ISBN 978-0-906890-04-2, OCLC 8229010
- Notes and Queries, vol. 1-5, 1990 (London: Fourth Estate) ISBN 978-1-872180-22-9, OCLC 22182928, a collection of Q&A from the readers of The Guardian
- Unspeakable Love: Gay and Lesbian Life in the Middle East, 2006 (London: Saqi Books) ISBN 978-0-86356-819-0, (Berkeley:University of California Press) ISBN 0-520-25017-6, OCLC 238877880
- What's "Really" Wrong with the Middle East?, 2009 (London: Saqi Books) ISBN 978-0-86356-624-0, OCLC 416261943
- Arabs Without God: Atheism and Freedom of Belief in the Arab World, 2014 (CreateSpace) ISBN 9781501064838
