= 2001–02 Port Vale F.C. season =

Port Vale F.C.
2001–02 season
- Chairman: Bill Bell
- Manager: Brian Horton
- Stadium: Vale Park
- Football League Second Division: 14th (58 points)
- FA Cup: Second Round (eliminated by Cardiff City)
- League Cup: Second Round (eliminated by Charlton Athletic)
- Football League Trophy: Area Quarter-finals (eliminated by Hull City)
- Player of the Year: Mark Goodlad
- Top goalscorer: League: Stephen McPhee (11); All: Stephen McPhee (14)
- Highest home attendance: 10,344 vs. Stoke City, 21 October 2001
- Lowest home attendance: 2,664 vs. Carlisle United, 16 October 2001
- Average home league attendance: 5,210
- Biggest win: 5–0 vs. Cambridge United, 5 October 2001
- Biggest defeat: 0–3 (three games)
Home colours

The 2001–02 season was Port Vale's 90th season of football in the English Football League and second-successive season (39th overall) in the Second Division. After finishing 11th the previous year and lifting the Football League Trophy, expectations were cautious. Under manager Brian Horton, the Valiants ultimately secured a 14th‑place finish with 58 points, a middling position that reflected inconsistency across the league season.

Both cup runs ended in the Second Round, Vale being knocked out of the FA Cup by Cardiff City and eliminated from the League Cup at the same stage. Meanwhile, the Football League Trophy campaign ended in the Area Quarter‑Finals, with defeat to Hull City curtailing hopes of a second straight final appearance. Off the pitch, Port Vale's financial position deteriorated. Revenue losses linked to the collapse of ITV Digital prompted plans for a 30% wage‑bill reduction, while internal turmoil saw a dismissed chief executive and a rejected takeover bid by the Valiant 2001 supporters' trust. By February, club debt had reached approximately £1.7 million, setting the stage for a more severe crisis the following season.

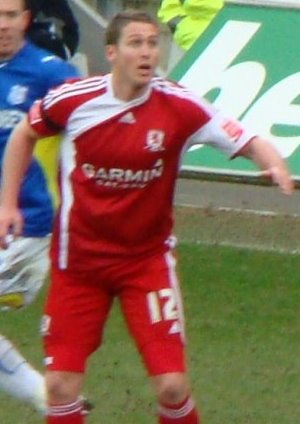
Striker Chris Killen.

== Overview ==
=== Second Division ===
The pre-season saw Brian Horton sign numerous bit-part players on free transfers: Ashley Dodd (Manchester United); Ian Armstrong (Liverpool); Phil Hardy (an eleven-year Wrexham veteran); Rae Ingram (Macclesfield Town); and Alex Gibson (Stoke City). He also signed Stephen McPhee from Coventry City, who would go on to become a key player for the club.

The season opened with six points from three games, with the sequence concluding with a 4–1 win over Peterborough United, after which Horton said that "I hope we don't start thinking every game will be a four-goal stroll because it won't be". This was followed by just one point from six games, in September, after failing to secure Paul Hall's signature, New Zealand international striker Chris Killen was signed on loan from Manchester City. Simon Osborn also joined from Wolverhampton Wanderers on a one-month contract, before he moved on to Gillingham. On 5 October, Vale won 5–0 at home to Cambridge United, with Killen scoring a brace and collecting an assist. Steve Torpey was allowed to join Scarborough on a one-month loan. Arriving in Burslem was Sean McClare, who joined on a one-month loan from Barnsley, before signing permanently when the loan deal finished. Frenchman Johan Gallon also had a trial at the club but was not offered a contract. On 21 October, Vale played rivals Stoke City, and McPhee scored for Vale, before Chris Iwelumo buried a late equaliser for the "Potters". The next month Danny Webber was taken in on loan from Manchester United.

Vale continued through the Christmas period in inconsistent form, despite the arrival of 36-year-old John Durnin. In January, Mvondo Atangana became the first Cameroonian to play for the Vale, when he joined on loan from Dundee United – he would only play two games before picking up a serious injury. Meanwhile, Richard Burgess was allowed to join Nuneaton Borough permanently. On 22 January, Vale recorded a 3–2 victory over Oldham Athletic with Marc Bridge-Wilkinson marking his return from a five-month injury layoff with the assist for McPhee's winning goal. Vale then went on a sequence of seven wins in eight games to shoot up the table, including a 1–0 win over Stoke at the Britannia Stadium thanks to a Micky Cummins header, as Horton was named Manager of the Month. The 23,019 attendance at Stoke was the highest at any match in the division during the season. In contrast, the lowest attendance figure was 2,379, who saw a 1–0 win at Cambridge United three days later. This run raised hopes of a play-off bid. It also encouraged chairman Bill Bell to offer new contracts to the management team (Horton, Grew, Foyle and Glover), as well as seven players. Horton was also awarded the Manager of the Month award for February. However, Vale finished poorly, winning just one of their final eleven games.

Vale finished in 14th place with 58 points, quite some distance from either the play-offs or the relegation zone. The team lost 14 of their 23 league games away from home. Stoke finished nine places and 22 points above the Vale and won promotion via the play-offs, never to meet the Vale again for the rest of the decade. McPhee hit 14 goals to become the club's top-scorer, with Brooker and Cummins close behind in the scoring charts. Cummins was also an ever-present. Overworked goalkeeper Mark Goodlad was voted Player of the Year.

At the end of the season, numerous players were allowed to leave on free transfers: Sagi Burton (Crewe Alexandra); George O'Callaghan (Cork City); Danny Maye (Southend United); Paul Donnelly (Stone Dominoes); Steve Torpey (Prescot Cables); and Phil Hardy. Durnin also turned his hand to coaching, and was appointed as the club's under-17 coach.

=== Finances ===
The collapse of ITV Digital cost the club £400,000 in revenue. Chairman Bill Bell announced a 30% cut in the players' wage budget at the end of the campaign. These ominous warnings belied a financial crisis that would hit the club hard the following season. In August, former chairman Jim Lloyd returned to the club as a director. The next month, Chief Executive Dave Jolley was sacked. A Charles Machin-led consortium made a £1 million bid for the club in December but was turned away by Bill Bell, who claimed that Valiant2001 "won't last three months". Later that month, former commercial director Neil Hughes was arrested for fraud allegedly stealing £20,000 from the club, but he denied the offence. The club's debt stood at £1.7 million in February. The next month, the Football Association's compliance unit began investigating the club but found no wrongdoing. The club's shirt sponsors were Tunstall Assurance.

=== Cup competitions ===
In the FA Cup, Vale avoided losing to a non-League club for the second successive season by beating Aylesbury United 3–0 at Vale Park. They had been held by the "Ducks" 0–0 at half-time, and the non-League side seemed to have taken the lead on 52 minutes until captain Scott Honeyball's headed goal was disallowed for an infringement; Burgess then put the Vale ahead two minutes later before Cummins and Brooker made the game safe. They exited at the second round after a 3–0 defeat to Cardiff City at Ninian Park.

In the League Cup, for the second consecutive season, Vale faced Third Division Chesterfield in the first round, this time, however, the two-legged format was scrapped in favour of a standard knock-out tournament structure. Vale progressed with a 2–1 win thanks to a brace from McPhee. It was a bad-tempered affair, with three sendings-off. Facing Premier League Charlton Athletic at The Valley in the second round, Alan Curbishley's men eliminated the Vale with a 2–0 win.

In the Football League Trophy, Vale advanced past Carlisle United and Rochdale to reach the Area Quarter-finals. where they faced Hull City at Boothferry Park. The "Tigers" eliminated the "Valiants" with a 2–1 win.

== Results ==
=== Football League Second Division ===
==== League table ====
Pos	Team	Pld	W	D	L	GF	GA	GD	Pts
12	Tranmere Rovers	46	16	15	15	63	60	+3	63
13	Swindon Town	46	15	14	17	46	56	−10	59
14	Port Vale	46	16	10	20	51	62	−11	58
15	Colchester United	46	15	12	19	65	76	−11	57
16	Blackpool	46	14	14	18	66	69	−3	56

Rules for classification: In the Football League goals scored (GF) takes precedence over goal difference (GD).

==== Results by matchday ====
Round	1	2	3	4	5	6	7	8	9	10	11	12	13	14	15	16	17	18	19	20	21	22	23	24	25	26	27	28	29	30	31	32	33	34	35	36	37	38	39	40	41	42	43	44	45	46
Ground	H	A	H	A	H	A	A	H	H	A	A	H	A	H	H	A	H	A	A	H	H	A	A	H	H	A	A	H	A	H	H	A	A	H	H	A	A	H	H	A	A	H	A	H	A	H
Result	W	L	W	L	L	D	L	L	L	W	L	W	D	D	L	W	W	L	D	D	D	L	L	W	W	L	L	W	W	W	D	W	W	W	W	L	L	L	D	L	D	W	L	D	L	L
Position	3	10	6	11	13	15	15	19	19	18	19	16	18	17	18	17	17	17	17	17	18	19	19	17	16	16	17	16	14	13	13	13	13	13	13	13	13	13	13	13	13	12	13	13	13	14
Points	3	3	6	6	6	7	7	7	7	10	10	13	14	15	15	18	21	21	22	23	24	24	24	27	30	30	30	33	36	39	40	43	46	49	52	52	52	52	53	53	54	57	57	58	58	58

Source: Statto
A = Away; H = Home; W = Win; D = Draw; L = Loss

==== Matches ====
11 August 2001 1	Port Vale	4–2	Notts County	Burslem
	McPhee 21'; O'Callaghan 47', 62'; Dodd 70'	Report	Cas 28'; Allsopp 53'	Stadium: Vale Park; Attendance: 6,076; Referee: Richard Beeby

18 August 2001 2	Brentford	2–0	Port Vale	Brentford, West London
	Evans 53'; Burgess 84'	Report		Stadium: Griffin Park; Attendance: 4,561; Referee: Paul Alcock

25 August 2001 3	Port Vale	4–1	Peterborough United	Burslem
	Hardy 32'; Cummins 50'; Brooker 78'; McPhee 90'	Report	Cullen 67'	Stadium: Vale Park; Attendance: 4,925; Referee: B. Curson

27 August 2001 4	Colchester United	2–0	Port Vale	Colchester
	Keith 21'; McGleish 46'	Report		Stadium: Layer Road; Attendance: 3,611; Referee: Paul Armstrong

1 September 2001 5	Port Vale	0–2	Reading	Burslem
		Report	Cureton 45', 62'	Stadium: Vale Park; Attendance: 5,196; Referee: Mike Pike

8 September 2001 6	Bristol City	1–1	Port Vale	Ashton Gate, Bristol
	Thorpe 49'	Report	O'Callaghan 10'	Stadium: Ashton Gate; Attendance: 12,560; Referee: Andy Hall

15 September 2001 7	Queens Park Rangers	4–1	Port Vale	Shepherd's Bush, West London
	Palmer 64'; Thomson 72', 76' (pen.), 90'	Report	Brooker 55'	Stadium: Loftus Road; Attendance: 9,295; Referee: Paul Danson

18 September 2001 8	Port Vale	0–2	Swindon Town	Burslem
		Report	Invincibile 32'; Hewlett 60'	Stadium: Vale Park; Attendance: 3,737; Referee: Mark Cooper

22 September 2001 9	Port Vale	0–1	Northampton Town	Burslem
		Report	Hunter 73'	Stadium: Vale Park; Attendance: 4,419; Referee: Alan Kaye

25 September 2001 10	Wrexham	1–3	Port Vale	Wrexham
	Faulconbridge 56'	Report	McPhee 42', 82'; Killen 46'	Stadium: Racecourse Ground; Attendance: 3,091; Referee: Graham Frankland

29 September 2001 11	Wycombe Wanderers	3–1	Port Vale	High Wycombe
	Walker 8', 14'; Rammell 12'	Report	Killen 53'	Stadium: Adams Park; Attendance: 5,714; Referee: Paul Taylor

5 October 2001 12	Port Vale	5–0	Cambridge United	Burslem
	Cummins 39'; Armstrong 46'; Killen 55', 59'; Brooker 57'	Report		Stadium: Vale Park; Attendance: 4,119; Referee: Roy Pearson

13 October 2001 13	Chesterfield	1–1	Port Vale	Chesterfield, Derbyshire
	Willis 54'	Report	Brooker 64'	Stadium: Saltergate; Attendance: 4,348; Referee: Ray Olivier

21 October 2001 14	Port Vale	1–1	Stoke City	Burslem
	McPhee 63'	Report	Iwelumo 78'	Stadium: Vale Park; Attendance: 10,344; Referee: Phil Richards

24 October 2001 15	Port Vale	0–2	Cardiff City	Burslem
		Report	Prior 19'; Earnshaw 34'	Stadium: Vale Park; Attendance: 4,552; Referee: Steve Dunn

27 October 2001 16	Wigan Athletic	0–1	Port Vale	Wigan
		Report	Killen 21'	Stadium: JJB Stadium; Attendance: 5,634; Referee: Colin Webster

3 November 2001 17	Port Vale	1–0	Bury	Burslem
	Killen 63'	Report		Stadium: Vale Park; Attendance: 4,688; Referee: Roger Furnandiz

10 November 2001 18	Brighton & Hove Albion	1–0	Port Vale	Brighton
	Zamora 49'	Report		Stadium: Withdean Stadium; Attendance: 6,648; Referee: Joe Ross

20 November 2001 19	AFC Bournemouth	0–0	Port Vale	Bournemouth
		Report		Stadium: Dean Court; Attendance: 4,428; Referee: Steve Tomlin

24 November 2001 20	Port Vale	1–1	Huddersfield Town	Burslem
	Cummins 81'	Report	Knight 67'	Stadium: Vale Park; Attendance: 5,026; Referee: Mike Jones

1 December 2001 21	Port Vale	1–1	Blackpool	Burslem
	Cummins 78'	Report	Coid 36'	Stadium: Vale Park; Attendance: 5,390; Referee: Frazer Stretton

15 December 2001 22	Tranmere Rovers	3–1	Port Vale	Prenton
	Allison 34', 83'; Yates 38'	Report	Cummins 30'	Stadium: Prenton Park; Attendance: 7,859; Referee: Graham Frankland

21 December 2001 23	Oldham Athletic	2–0	Port Vale	Oldham
	Eyres 30'; Reeves 57'	Report		Stadium: Boundary Park; Attendance: 4,317; Referee: Graham Salisbury

26 December 2001 24	Port Vale	1–0	Bristol City	Burslem
	McPhee 63'	Report		Stadium: Vale Park; Attendance: 5,682; Referee: Roy Pearson

29 December 2001 25	Port Vale	3–1	Colchester United	Burslem
	Armstrong 35'; Rowland 39'; Brooker 69'	Report	Duguid 90'	Stadium: Vale Park; Attendance: 4,444; Referee: David Crick

1 January 2002 26	Reading	2–0	Port Vale	Reading, Berkshire
15:00 GMT	Cureton 83' (pen.), 89'	Report		Stadium: Madejski Stadium; Attendance: 10,743; Referee: Phil Prosser

8 January 2002 27	Peterborough United	3–0	Port Vale	Peterborough
	Watson 20'; Bullard 47'; Oldfield 65'	Report		Stadium: London Road Stadium; Attendance: 3,747; Referee: Lee Cable

12 January 2002 28	Port Vale	2–1	Brentford	Burslem
	McPhee 45' (pen.); Armstrong 70'	Report	Owusu 31'	Stadium: Vale Park; Attendance: 4,588; Referee: Alan Butler

19 January 2002 29	Notts County	1–3	Port Vale	Nottingham
	Fenton 86'	Report	Brooker 16', 76'; McPhee 38' (pen.)	Stadium: Meadow Lane; Attendance: 6,006; Referee: Paul Rejer

22 January 2002 30	Port Vale	3–2	Oldham Athletic	Burslem
	McClare 22'; Brooker 45'; McPhee 80'	Report	Appleby 48'; Corazzin 70'	Stadium: Vale Park; Attendance: 4,408; Referee: Mark Clattenburg

2 February 2002 31	Port Vale	1–1	Wycombe Wanderers	Burslem
	Durnin 23'	Report	Bulman 73'	Stadium: Vale Park; Attendance: 4,737; Referee: Mike Pike

10 February 2002 32	Stoke City	0–1	Port Vale	Stoke-on-Trent
		Report	Cummins 36'	Stadium: Britannia Stadium; Attendance: 23,019; Referee: Graham Laws

13 February 2002 33	Cambridge United	0–1	Port Vale	Cambridge
		Report	McPhee 37'	Stadium: Abbey Stadium; Attendance: 2,379; Referee: David Crick

16 February 2002 34	Port Vale	4–1	Chesterfield	Burslem
	Cummins 41', 72'; Bridge-Wilkinson 90', 90'	Report	Hurst 68'	Stadium: Vale Park; Attendance: 5,529; Referee: George Cain

23 February 2002 35	Port Vale	1–0	Queens Park Rangers	Burslem
	Bridge-Wilkinson 18'	Report		Stadium: Vale Park; Attendance: 6,228; Referee: John Brandwood

26 February 2002 36	Northampton Town	1–0	Port Vale	Northampton
	Forrester 19'	Report		Stadium: Sixfields Stadium; Attendance: 5,155; Referee: Scott Mathieson

2 March 2002 37	Swindon Town	3–0	Port Vale	Swindon
	Gurney 43'; Heywood 45'; Willis 83'	Report		Stadium: County Ground; Attendance: 5,867; Referee: Mike Jones

5 March 2002 38	Port Vale	1–3	Wrexham	Burslem
	McPhee 59'	Report	Edwards 36'; Trundle 85' (pen.), 87'	Stadium: Vale Park; Attendance: 4,436; Referee: Phil Richards

9 March 2002 39	Port Vale	1–1	Tranmere Rovers	Burslem
	Bridge-Wilkinson 23'	Report	Haworth 10'	Stadium: Vale Park; Attendance: 4,630; Referee: Colin Webster

16 March 2002 40	Blackpool	4–0	Port Vale	Blackpool
	Murphy 51', 84'; Walker 70'; Bullock 90'	Report		Stadium: Bloomfield Road; Attendance: 7,811; Referee: Alan Butler

23 March 2002 41	Bury	1–1	Port Vale	Bury, Greater Manchester
	Newby 70'	Report	Bridge-Wilkinson 79'	Stadium: Gigg Lane; Attendance: 3,700; Referee: Richard Beeby

30 March 2002 42	Port Vale	1–0	Wigan Athletic	Burslem
	Brooker 45'	Report		Stadium: Vale Park; Attendance: 4,359; Referee: Paul Alcock

1 April 2002 43	Cardiff City	1–0	Port Vale	Cardiff
	Thorne 74'	Report		Stadium: Ninian Park; Attendance: 15,556; Referee: Phil Richards

6 April 2002 44	Port Vale	0–0	AFC Bournemouth	Burslem
		Report		Stadium: Vale Park; Attendance: 3,514; Referee: Graham Salisbury

13 April 2002 45	Huddersfield Town	2–1	Port Vale	Huddersfield
	Facey 42'; Booth 65'	Report	Bridge-Wilkinson 7'	Stadium: Kirklees Stadium; Attendance: 12,270; Referee: Mick Fletcher

20 April 2002 46	Port Vale	0–1	Brighton & Hove Albion	Burslem
		Report	Watson 72'	Stadium: Vale Park; Attendance: 8,812; Referee: Mike Ryan

=== FA Cup ===
17 November 2001 R1	Port Vale	3–0	Aylesbury United	Burslem
	Burgess 54'; Cummins 71'; Brooker 90'	Report		Stadium: Vale Park; Attendance: 4,956; Referee: Bill Jordan

8 December 2001 R2	Cardiff City	3–0	Port Vale	Cardiff
	Earnshaw; Gordon; Fortune-West	Report		Stadium: Ninian Park; Attendance: 9,650; Referee: Peter Walton

=== League Cup ===
21 August 2001 R1	Port Vale	2–1	Chesterfield	Burslem
	McPhee 14', 35'	Report	Rowland 4'	Stadium: Vale Park; Attendance: 2,723; Referee: Phil Prosser

12 September 2001 R2	Charlton Athletic	2–0	Port Vale	Charlton, London
	Fortune 36'; Konchesky 63'	Report		Stadium: The Valley; Attendance: 7,247; Referee: Keith Hill

=== Football League Trophy ===
16 October 2001 R1	Port Vale	2–1	Carlisle United	Burslem
	Armstrong 55'; Brooker 61'	Report	Foran 19'	Stadium: Vale Park; Attendance: 2,664; Referee: Trevor Parkes

30 October 2001 R2	Rochdale	1–2	Port Vale	Rochdale
	Townson 49'	Report	Burton 53' (pen.); Armstrong 66'	Stadium: Spotland Stadium; Attendance: 1,639; Referee: Mike Ryan

4 December 2001 Northern Section Quarter-final	Hull City	2–1	Port Vale	Kingston upon Hull
19:45 BST	Whittle 26'; Whitmore 66'	Report	McPhee 14'	Stadium: Boothferry Park; Attendance: 5,326; Referee: Steve Baines

== Squad statistics ==
=== Appearances and goals ===
Key to positions: GK – Goalkeeper; DF – Defender; MF – Midfielder; FW – Forward

No.	Pos	Nat	Player	Total		Second Division		FA Cup		League Cup		Football League Trophy	
No.	Pos	Nat	Player	Apps	Goals	Apps	Goals	Apps	Goals	Apps	Goals	Apps	Goals
1	GK	(England) ENG	Mark Goodlad	50	0	43	0	2	0	2	0	3	0
2	DF	(England) ENG	Matt Carragher	47	0	41	0	2	0	2	0	2	0
3	DF	(Republic of Ireland) IRL	Phil Hardy	10	1	8	1	0	0	2	0	0	0
4	MF	(England) ENG	Sean McClare	26	1	23	1	1	0	0	0	2	0
5	DF	(England) ENG	Michael Walsh	29	0	28	0	0	0	1	0	0	0
6	DF	(Saint Kitts and Nevis) SKN	Sagi Burton	42	1	37	0	2	0	1	0	2	1
7	MF	(England) ENG	Neil Brisco	43	0	37	0	1	0	2	0	3	0
8	MF	(Republic of Ireland) IRL	Micky Cummins	53	9	46	8	2	1	2	0	3	0
9	FW	(England) ENG	Steve Brooker	48	11	41	9	2	1	2	0	3	1
10	FW	(Scotland) SCO	Stephen McPhee	51	14	44	11	2	0	2	2	3	1
11	MF	(England) ENG	Marc Bridge-Wilkinson	19	6	19	6	0	0	0	0	0	0
12	GK	(England) ENG	Dean Delany	4	0	4	0	0	0	0	0	0	0
13	GK	(England) ENG	Chris Gowan	0	0	0	0	0	0	0	0	0	0
14	DF	(England) ENG	Rae Ingram	30	0	24	0	2	0	2	0	2	0
16	MF	(England) ENG	Ashley Dodd	13	1	9	1	2	0	1	0	1	0
17	MF	(England) ENG	Ian Armstrong	34	5	31	3	1	0	0	0	2	2
18	MF	(Republic of Ireland) IRL	George O'Callaghan	15	3	11	3	1	0	2	0	1	0
19	DF	(England) ENG	Alex Gibson	2	0	1	0	0	0	0	0	1	0
20	DF	(England) ENG	Paul Donnelly	8	0	6	0	0	0	0	0	2	0
21	DF	(Northern Ireland) NIR	Liam Burns	39	0	34	0	2	0	1	0	2	0
22	DF	(England) ENG	Paul Taylor	0	0	0	0	0	0	0	0	0	0
23	DF	(Wales) WAL	Steve Rowland	29	1	25	1	2	0	0	0	2	0
24	MF	(England) ENG	Ben Simpson	0	0	0	0	0	0	0	0	0	0
25	MF	(England) ENG	Danny Maye	3	0	2	0	0	0	0	0	1	0
26	FW	(England) ENG	Billy Paynter	8	0	7	0	1	0	0	0	0	0
27	FW	(England) ENG	Steve Torpey	1	0	1	0	0	0	0	0	0	0
28	MF	(Trinidad and Tobago) TTO	Chris Birchall	2	0	1	0	0	0	1	0	0	0
30	MF	(England) ENG	John Durnin	19	1	19	1	0	0	0	0	0	0
Players who featured but departed the club during the season:
4	MF	(England) ENG	Simon Osborn	8	0	7	0	0	0	1	0	0	0
15	FW	(England) ENG	Richard Burgess	3	1	2	0	1	1	0	0	0	0
15	FW	(Cameroon) CMR	Mvondo Atangana	2	0	2	0	0	0	0	0	0	0
29	FW	(New Zealand) NZL	Chris Killen	10	6	9	6	0	0	0	0	1	0
29	FW	(England) ENG	Danny Webber	5	0	4	0	0	0	0	0	1	0
30	DF	(South Africa) RSA	Paul Byrne	2	0	1	0	0	0	0	0	1	0

=== Top scorers ===
Place	Position	Nation	Number	Name	Second Division	FA Cup	League Cup	Football League Trophy	Total
1	FW	Scotland	10	Stephen McPhee	11	0	2	1	14
2	FW	England	9	Steve Brooker	9	1	0	1	11
3	MF	Ireland	8	Micky Cummins	8	1	0	0	9
4	FW	New Zealand	29	Chris Killen	6	0	0	0	6
–	FW	England	#	Marc Bridge-Wilkinson	6	0	0	0	6
6	MF	England	17	Ian Armstrong	3	0	0	2	5
7	MF	Ireland	18	George O'Callaghan	3	0	0	0	3
8	DF	Wales	232	Steve Rowland	1	0	0	0	1
–	DF	Ireland	3	Phil Hardy	1	0	0	0	1
–	MF	England	4	Sean McClare	1	0	0	0	1
–	MF	England	30	John Durnin	1	0	0	0	1
–	MF	England	16	Ashley Dodd	1	0	0	0	1
–	DF	Saint Kitts	6	Sagi Burton	0	0	0	1	1
–	FW	England	15	Richard Burgess	0	1	0	0	1
–		–	–	Own goals	0	0	0	0	0
				TOTALS	51	3	2	5	61

== Transfers ==
=== Transfers in ===
Date from	Position	Nationality	Name	From	Fee	Ref.
May 2001	MF	ENG	Ashley Dodd	Manchester United	Free transfer	
June 2001	DF	ENG	Alex Gibson	Stoke City	Free transfer	
June 2001	DF	IRL	Phil Hardy	Wrexham	Free transfer	
June 2001	DF	ENG	Rae Ingram	Macclesfield Town	Free transfer	
July 2001	FW	SCO	Stephen McPhee	Coventry City	Free transfer	
August 2001	FW	ENG	Steve Torpey	Liverpool	Free transfer	
Summer 2001	MF	ENG	Ian Armstrong	Liverpool	Free transfer	
September 2001	MF	ENG	Simon Osborn	Wolverhampton Wanderers	Free transfer	
29 November 2001	MF	ENG	Sean McClare	Barnsley	Free transfer	
December 2001	MF	ENG	John Durnin	(Wales) Rhyl	Free transfer	

=== Transfers out ===
Date from	Position	Nationality	Name	To	Fee	Ref.
October 2001	MF	ENG	Simon Osborn	Gillingham	Free transfer	
January 2002	FW	ENG	Richard Burgess	Nuneaton Borough	Free transfer	
April 2002	MF	ENG	Ashley Dodd	Moor Green	Free transfer	
April 2002	DF	IRL	Phil Hardy		Released	
May 2002	MF	IRL	George O'Callaghan	(Republic of Ireland) Cork City	Free transfer	
May 2002	FW	ENG	Steve Torpey	Prescot Cables	Free transfer	
June 2002	MF	ENG	Danny Maye	Southend United	Free transfer	
July 2002	DF	ENG	Paul Donnelly	Stone Dominoes	Free transfer	
July 2002	DF	ENG	Alex Gibson	Stafford Rangers	Free transfer	
August 2002	DF	SKN	Sagi Burton	Crewe Alexandra	Free transfer	

=== Loans in ===
Date from	Position	Nationality	Name	From	Date to	Ref.
23 September 2001	FW	NZ	Chris Killen	Manchester City	23 November 2001	
19 October 2001	MF	ENG	Sean McClare	Barnsley	28 November 2001	
23 November 2001	FW	ENG	Danny Webber	Manchester United	31 December 2001	
18 January 2002	FW	CMR	Mvondo Atangana	(Scotland) Dundee United	18 February 2002	

=== Loans out ===
Date from	Position	Nationality	Name	To	Date to	Ref.
15 October 2001	FW	ENG	Steve Torpey	Scarborough	15 November 2001	
