= Liverpool Free Press =

Defunct independent newspaper

- News you're not supposed to know
- Type: Alternative weekly
- Founded: 1971
- Ceased publication: 1977
- City: Liverpool, England
- Free online archives: freepressarchive.com/index.html

Liverpool Free Press was an independent newspaper printed in Liverpool, England, between 1971 and 1977 that specialised in investigative journalism.

== Origins ==
The paper's origin can be traced to a newspaper known as Pak-o-Lies which was printed in response to the Liverpool Echo and Daily Post running a disinformative advert claiming that striking postmasters had agreed a deal to end their strike. Pak-o-Lies claimed that the Liverpool Echo managing editor had forced the advert on to the front of the Echo as the postal strike was costing the Echo and Daily Post "thousands of pounds of lost revenue".

A few months after first publishing Pak-o-Lies, the Liverpool Free Press was established. Its five founding staff members were journalists from the Echo: Steve Scott, Derek Massey, Rob Rohrer, Chris Oxley and Brian Whitaker. Initially produced in the flat of Chris Oxley and several other offices, the paper opened an office above News From Nowhere, a bookshop ran as a not-for-profit cooperative.

During the early stages of the Free Press, its journalists maintained a dual lifestyle; writing for the Post and Echo whilst running the Free Press during their free time. Whilst Pak-o-Lies had focused on attacking the Post and Echo, the Free Press was intended as an alternative to them. As well as the investigative journalism, it had sections devoted to local music, theatre, social clubs and places to drink. The paper specifically avoided printing stories that were not deemed "useful", such as stories about celebrities.

== Printing and distribution ==
The first few editions of the paper used an IBM 'golfball' typewriter for typesetting, which was owned by local musician and humourist, Fritz Spiegl. Later, Free Press would purchase its own IBM typewriter. After the pages had been set, they were printed using lithography by Derek Massey using a printing press he had on Dock Road. Distribution of the paper was first handled by the journalists and local volunteers. Mindful that a deal with a large distributor would leave the Free Press exposed if the distributor objected to the paper's content, the paper eventually settled on using five local distributors. By that point, 10,000 copies of each edition were being printed.

== Investigations in Kirkby ==
One of the paper's greatest achievements in investigative journalism were about corruption in the Liverpool borough of Kirkby. The Free Press poured considerable resources into investigating the circumstances around the building of a dry ski slope in Kirkby in 1973. Thanks to an anonymous letter from a council employee tipping them off, they were able to discover that council leader Dave Tempest and council architect Eric Spencer Stevenson were colluding with local builder George Leatherbarrow. In return for Leatherbarrow receiving lucrative contracts for the council, Tempest and Stevenson were rewarded with trips and gifts and extensions were built on their houses using materials from a council estate in Kirkby. As a result of the paper's investigations, Tempest, Stevenson and Leatherbarrow were jailed for their participation in the fraud.

== Decline ==
During its run, the Free Press barely broken even and was heavily reliant on the few advertisers it had. During one of the paper's investigations into local petrol stations, they had claimed that several councillors had been able to be influenced in the planning decisions around the petrol stations. When the paper mentioned that Rex Makin, the lawyer successfully defending one of the accused councillors, had shares in a trust fund for his children in a petrol station owned by a different councillor, Makin threatened the paper with legal action. Despite the paper only mentioning this in passing and not suggesting any malpractice, Makin sent threatening letters to the paper's distributors and some newsagents, resulting in the distributors and newsagents pulling out. Months afterwards this, the paper was accused of contempt of court after running a story about a Serious Crimes Squad detective who had been found to have a hidden safe in his garage containing stolen property. Despite eventually facing no charges, the focus on the paper led to further distribution problems. With costs rising and less money coming in, the last edition of the paper was published two months late in April 1977.

== Legacy ==
Brian Whitaker went to work for The Times and later was the Middle East editor for The Guardian.

Chris Oxley continued to work in investigative journalism and would later work as a TV producer on shows such as Panorama and Dispatches.

Steve Scott and Rob Rohrer began working in television, with Rob later having his own production company.

Derek Massey went on to work as a photojournalist as well as being an advocate for cycling and successfully campaigning for the preservation of the palm house in Sefton Park. He died in April 2017.
