= Listed buildings in Kirkby =

Kirkby is a town in the Metropolitan Borough of Knowsley, Merseyside, England. It contains 15 buildings that are recorded in the National Heritage List for England as designated listed buildings. Of these, one is listed at Grade II*, the middle of the three grades, and the others are at Grade II, the lowest grade.

Until the Second World War, Kirkby was a small community. It then became a place to house people from Liverpool moved by slum clearance. All the listed buildings date from before this time, and consist of a church, houses and associated structures, two public houses, and a war memorial.

== Key ==
Grade	Criteria
II*	Particularly important buildings of more than special interest
II	Buildings of national importance and special interest

== Buildings ==
Name and location	Photograph	Date	Notes	Grade
The Cottage; 53.48624°N 2.90165°W	—	18th century (possible)	A brick house with a slate roof in two storeys. Its plan consists of two parallel gabled blocks. The windows are casements, and the entrance is through a small porch on the left side.	II
Vicarage; 53.48387°N 2.89167°W		1840	The vicarage is in sandstone with a slate roof. It has two storeys and contains a bay window, steep gables, and mullioned and transomed windows. On a projecting chimney is a coat of arms.	II
Stables; 53.48402°N 2.89162°W	—	1840	The stables are to the north of the vicarage. They are built in sandstone, and are in a similar style to the vicarage.	II
Kirkby Hall Lodge; 53.48359°N 2.89383°W	—	c. 1840 (probable)	The lodge is in red sandstone with a tiled roof. It has a single storey, a gabled porch and a bay window, and contains mullioned windows. On the roof is ornamental cresting.	II
Carter's Arms public house 53.48835°N 2.90179°W		19th century	The public house is stuccoed with a slate roof, and in two storeys. The entrance front is in three bays with a central doorway and a two-storey bay window to the left. The windows are sashes.	II
14 and 16 South Park Road; 53.48721°N 2.90468°W	—	Victorian	A pair of semi-detached houses in brick with stone dressings in three storeys. Each house is in two bays, and there is a gable over the central two bays. The outer bays contain doorways, that on the left with a porch, and they rise to towers with pyramidal roofs. The inner bays have bay windows. At the sides of both houses are recessed gabled wings.	II
Lytham House; 53.48882°N 2.90301°W	—	Victorian	A detached brick house in two storeys, the lower floor being stuccoed. It has a central round-headed doorway with pilasters and a fanlight, flanked by bay windows. All the windows are sashes.	II
Sefton Cottage; 53.48430°N 2.89590°W	—	Victorian	A sandstone house, later divided into flats. It is in two storeys, and contains mullioned windows, three on the ground floor and two above.	II
Waverley House; 53.48658°N 2.90415°W		Victorian	A brick villa with stone dressings and a slate roof. It is in two storeys, and has a large square three-storey tower with a pyramidal roof on the northeast corner.	II
Railway public house and Langtree Cottage; 53.48696°N 2.90196°W		c. 1860	A public house and an adjoining private house, both in brick with slate roofs, and both in two storeys. The public house has four gabled half-dormers with bargeboards. The private house has a central doorcase of Tuscan pilasters with a cornice.	II
38 and 40 North Park Road; 53.48926°N 2.90483°W	—	Late Victorian	A pair of stuccoed semi-detached houses with slate roofs in two storeys. Each house has a central segmental-headed doorway with a fanlight. Outside the doorway is a bay window with a modillioned cornice, and inside is a sash window.	II
St Chad's Church; 53.48425°N 2.89312°W		1869–71	The church replaced an earlier church on the site, and was designed by Paley and Austin; it contains Norman and Gothic features. The church is built in sandstone with tiled roofs, and consists of a nave with a clerestory, north and south porches, north and south aisles, a short chancel with an organ loft to the north and a chapel to the south, and a tower at the crossing. The tower has a saddleback roof, and a stair turret with a conical slated roof.	II*
1 and 3 Mill Lane; 53.48880°N 2.90099°W		1885	Originally a smithy attached to a pair of semi-detached houses. They are in brick with sandstone dressings and tiled roofs. The former smithy is in a single storey and has mullioned windows and a pargetted gable. The houses have two storeys and their outer bays project forward with pargetted gables. The centre bays contain doorways and a gabled half-dormer.	II
War Memorial; 53.48399°N 2.89283°W		c. 1920	The war memorial stands in the churchyard of St Chad's Church. It is in sandstone and has a square two-stepped inscribed base on an octagonal plinth. On this stands a panelled column with ball flower ornamentation carrying a cross. The cross is carved with foliage, and it includes a central circular relief with the head of Christ and, on the reverse, the Chi Rho monogram.	II
Gate piers 53.48346°N 2.89140°W	—	Undated	The gate piers stand to the south of the vicarage. They are in stone, have a square section, are gabled, and contain pointed niches.	II
