= Kirkby =

Town in Merseyside, England

Coordinates: 53.48°N 2.89°W

- Town
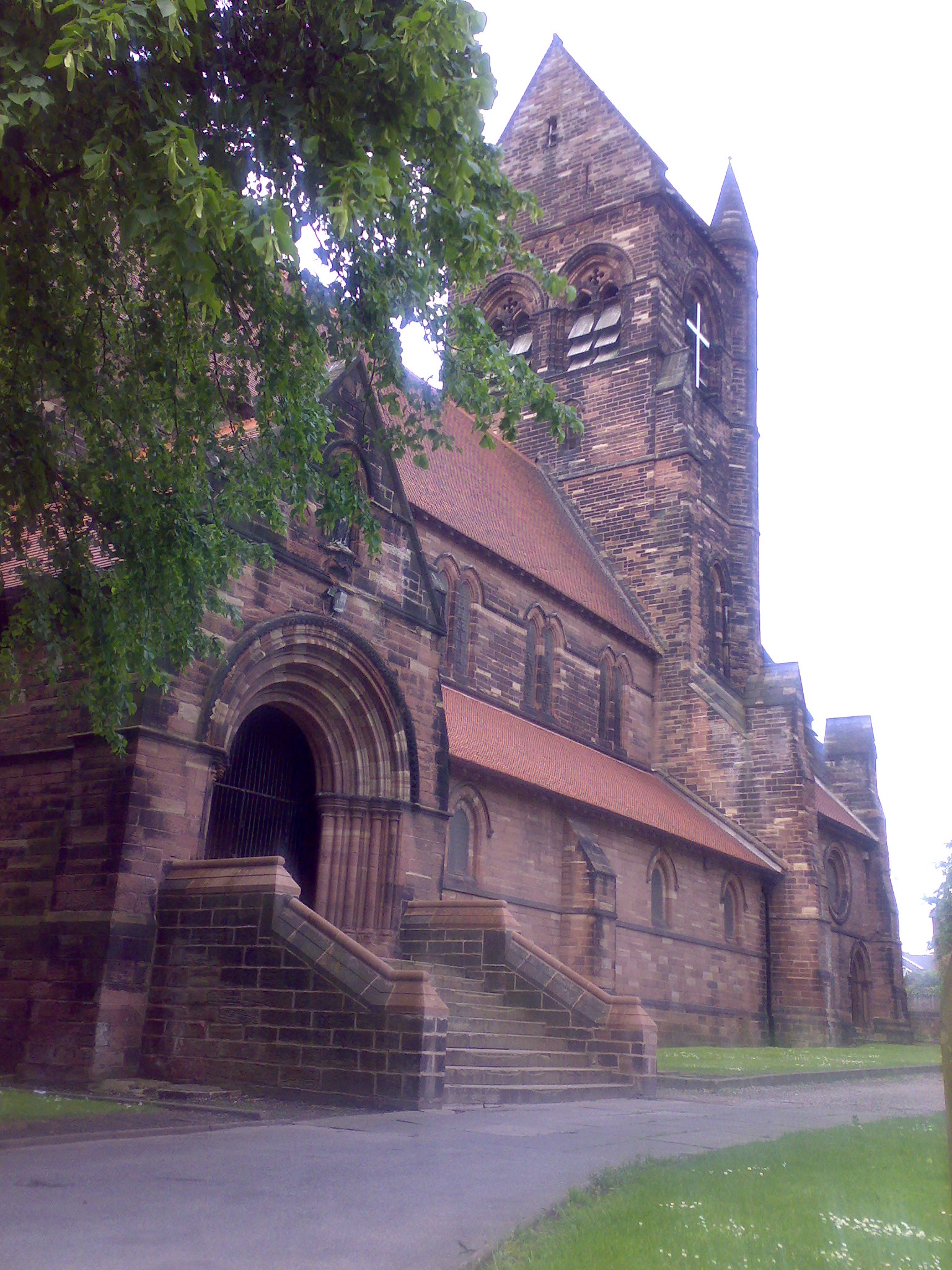
- St Chad's Church, Kirkby's parish church

- Location within Merseyside
- Population: 45,564 (2021 Census)
- OS grid reference: SJ409988
  - London: 180 miles (290 km) SE
- Metropolitan borough: Knowsley
- Metropolitan county: Merseyside
- Region: North West
- Country: England
- Sovereign state: United Kingdom
- Post town: LIVERPOOL
- Postcode district: L10, L32, L33
- Dialling code: 0151
- Police: Merseyside
- Fire: Merseyside
- Ambulance: North West
- UK Parliament: Knowsley

Kirkby (/ˈkɜːbi/ KUR-bee) is a town in the Metropolitan Borough of Knowsley, Merseyside, England. The town, historically in Lancashire, has a size of 4,070 acres (16.5 km^{2}) is 5 miles (8 km) north of Huyton and 6 miles (10 km) north-east of Liverpool. The population in 2016 was 41,495 making it the largest in Knowsley and the 9th biggest settlement in Merseyside.

Evidence of Bronze Age activity has been noted though the first direct evidence of a settlement dates to 1086 via the Domesday Book. The town was mainly farmland until the mid-20th century until the construction of ROF Kirkby, the largest Royal Ordnance Factory filling munitions, during the Second World War; Kirkby's urban development happened in the post-war period.

In November 2020, Liverpool F.C. relocated its training facilities from the Melwood site in West Derby, to the town following the completion of the new training centre.

== History ==
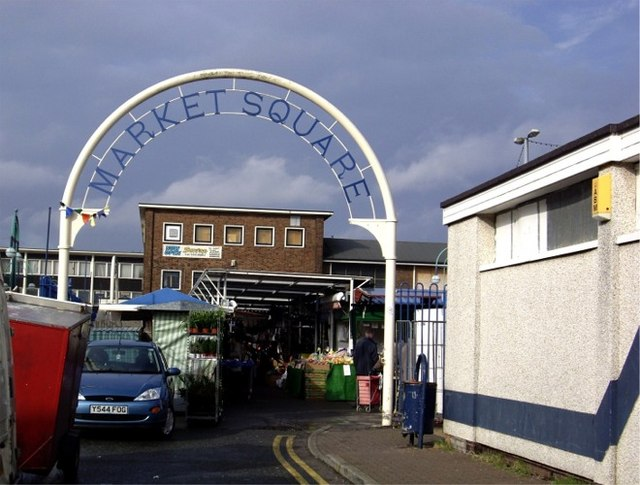
Entrance to Kirkby Market

Archaeological evidence of Bronze Age settlement indicates that Kirkby was founded around 870 AD. Historically, it has been part of Lancashire. The name Kirkby derives from Old Norse kirkja("church") and býr("village, farm"). Settlers from Norway arrived via Ireland around 900. The first direct evidence of a settlement dates from 1086 and the Domesday Book, with a reference to "Cherchebi" (population 70). Ownership of present-day Kirkby (established as the West Derby hundred in the 11th century) passed through a number of hands until 1596, when the Molyneux family purchased the hundred. After a brief loss of patronage in 1737 (when the head of the family took holy orders), in 1771, Charles Molyneux became the 1st Earl of Sefton and regained the land.

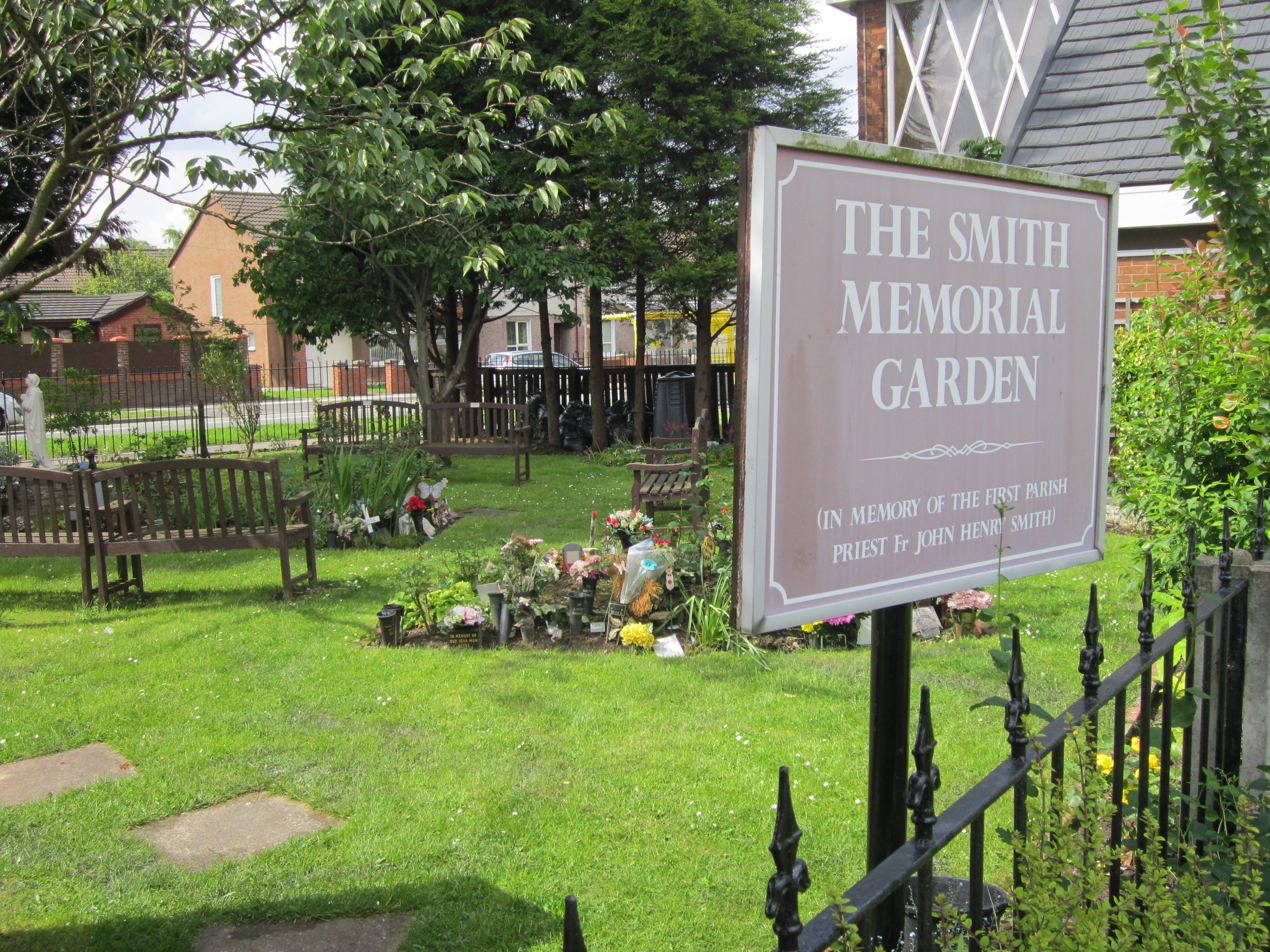
The Smith Memorial Garden, commemorating the first parish priest

Although it remained largely farmland until the mid-20th century, transport links to the region began in 1848 with the building of the Liverpool and Bury Railway through Kirkby. The East Lancashire Road (the A580) added a road connection in 1935, and industrial development was considered before the Second World War. ROF Kirkby, a Royal Ordnance Factory, was established in 1939 and completed in 1941. At its peak, the factory employed over 20,000 workers.

Liverpool had received much damage by the end of the war, and much of the remaining housing stock were slums. The Liverpool Corporation began a policy of buying land in surrounding areas and moving industry (and people) to newly developed "overspill" estates. This process culminated with the purchase of 4,070 acres (16.5 km^{2}) of land, including Kirkby, from the Earl of Sefton in 1947 for £375,000 (£12.7 million adjusted for inflation). Kirkby became Merseyside's largest over-spill estates. A 1949 Liverpool proposal to have Kirkby designated a new town was rejected. Large-scale development began in February 1950 with the construction of the Southdene neighbourhood; the first houses were finished in 1952, the 5,000th in 1956, and the 10,000th in 1961. A population of 3,000 in 1951 grew to over 52,000 by 1961. The Kirkby Urban District was created in 1958. Its population grew between the 1950s and the 1970s due to over-spill housing for Liverpool.

Growth caused a number of problems, including a lack of local amenities. Although occupation of Southdene's council estates had begun in 1952, its first shops were not completed until 1955 and its first pub did not open until 1959. The people who were being moved into Kirkby during this period came from Liverpool's poorest areas. Kirkby Industrial Estate expanded to become one of England's largest; at its peak in 1971, the estate employed over 26,000 people.

Kirkby became an Urban District in 1958. This status was later abolished, and on 1 April 1974 Kirkby was combined with Huyton with Roby and Prescot Urban District and parts of Whiston and West Lancashire Rural Districts to form the Metropolitan Borough of Knowsley.

== Government ==
Kirkby has been represented in Parliament as part of the Knowsley constituency since 2010. The town has been represented by Labour Party MP Anneliese Midgley since 2024. She was preceded by George Howarth (Labour, 1986–2024), Robert Kilroy-Silk (Labour, 1974–1986), Harold Soref (Conservative, 1970–1974) and Harold Wilson (Labour, 1950–1970).

Kirkby is divided into four districts: Southdene, Westvale, Northwood and Tower Hill. Its electoral wards, which do not coincide with the districts, are Cherryfield, Kirkby Central, Northwood, Park, Shevington and Whitefield. Kirkby's 18 local councillors belong to the Labour Party, and often run unopposed.

== Geography ==
Kirkby is 6 miles (10 km) north-east of Liverpool, in Merseyside in North West England. It is 180 miles (290 km) north-west of London and 5 miles (8 km) north-west of Huyton, the borough administrative headquarters. The River Alt flows through the town's extreme south-west, with the Kirkby Brook tributary passing through its centre.

=== Climate ===
Due to its position near England's north-west coast, Kirkby has a temperate maritime climate; its Köppen climate classification is Cfb. Its mean annual temperature of 10.2 °C (50.4 °F) is similar to that throughout the Mersey basin and slightly cooler than the English average. The annual average sunshine duration, 1394.6 hours, is slightly higher than the UK average of 1339.7. January is the coldest month, with an average mean temperature of 4.7 °C (40.5 °F); July is the hottest, at 16.7 °C (62.1 °F). Rainfall, 806.6 millimetres (31.76 in), is slightly lower than the England average of 838 millimetres (33.0 in) and much lower than the UK average of 1,125.5 millimetres (44.31 in). October is the wettest month, with an average rainfall of 86 millimetres (3.4 in); April is the driest, with 49.1 millimetres (1.93 in) of rain. The nearest Met Office weather station is at Manchester Airport.

Climate data for Kirkby and the Liverpool area
Month	Jan	Feb	Mar	Apr	May	Jun	Jul	Aug	Sep	Oct	Nov	Dec	Year
Mean daily maximum °C (°F)	6.8 (44.2)	6.6 (43.9)	9.3 (48.7)	11.8 (53.2)	15.4 (59.7)	17.8 (64.0)	20.3 (68.5)	19.2 (66.6)	16.8 (62.2)	12.8 (55.0)	9.2 (48.6)	7.8 (46.0)	12.8 (55.0)
Daily mean °C (°F)	4.7 (40.5)	4.37 (39.87)	6.6 (43.9)	8.4 (47.1)	11.7 (53.1)	14.3 (57.7)	16.7 (62.1)	16.2 (61.2)	13.8 (56.8)	10.6 (51.1)	7.1 (44.8)	5.9 (42.6)	10.2 (50.4)
Mean daily minimum °C (°F)	2 (36)	2.2 (36.0)	3.2 (37.8)	4.4 (39.9)	6.4 (43.5)	10.5 (50.9)	12.7 (54.9)	12.2 (54.0)	10 (50)	7.2 (45.0)	4.4 (39.9)	3 (37)	6.5 (43.7)
Average rainfall mm (inches)	71.5 (2.81)	51.8 (2.04)	64 (2.5)	49.1 (1.93)	53.8 (2.12)	66.8 (2.63)	59.5 (2.34)	70.9 (2.79)	69.9 (2.75)	86 (3.4)	81.9 (3.22)	81.4 (3.20)	806.6 (31.76)
Mean monthly sunshine hours	49.6	67	95.2	138.9	188.8	172.5	183.8	170.5	127.2	97.7	60.6	42.8	1,394.6
Source 1: The Weather Channel (Temperature Data)
Source 2: Met Office (Sunshine and Rainfall Data)

== Demographics ==
Kirkby's population was 42,744 in the 2011 census. This was just over a quarter of the total population of the borough of Knowsley and was down from its peak of 52,207 in the 1961 census, largely due to a falling birth rate and the slow decline of the industrial estate. Housing demand has increased, however, with significant developments built across the town. Part of the demand may be attributed to a need for replacement housing stock due to the demolition of high-rise flats and maisonettes, built during the 1960s and now in disrepair.

According to British government statistics, the borough of Knowsley (including Kirkby) had a population of 145,900 in the 2011 census and a gender balance of 52.6 per cent female to 47.4 per cent male. This is down from 150,459 in the 2001 census. The borough has a white population of 98.42 per cent, compared with the national average of 90.9 per cent. Other ethnic groups are multiracial (0.83 per cent), Chinese (0.24 per cent), other Asian (0.23 per cent) and Black (0.22 per cent). A large proportion of the population is of Irish Catholic descent as a result of immigration into Liverpool.

The borough is mostly Christian (85.63 per cent), compared to the national average of 71.74 per cent. The next-largest group (5.84 per cent) describe themselves as non-religious, significantly lower than the national average of 14.59 per cent. Muslims, Hindus, Buddhists and Jews are 0.17, 0.11, 0.07 and 0.03 per cent of the population.

=== Population changes ===
Kirkby's population was on a gradual downward trend from 1861 to 1931 before it rose when the Liverpool Corporation began to develop the region. Its annual growth rate from 1951 to 1961 was over 30 per cent, making it England's fastest-growing town by far. Kirkby's population peaked in 1971 at 59,917, before declining. The town's population has again begun to increase.

Historical population

Year	Pop.	±% p.a.
1861	1,451	—
1871	1,397	−0.38%
1881	1,401	+0.03%
1891	1,283	−0.88%
1911	1,211	−0.29%

Year	Pop.	±% p.a.
1921	1,116	−0.81%
1931	1,151	+0.31%
1951	3,078	+5.04%
1961	52,088	+32.69%
1971	59,917	+1.41%

Year	Pop.	±% p.a.
2001	40,472	−1.30%
2006	44,120	+1.74%
2011	42,744	−0.63%
2016	41,495	−0.59%

Source: A Vision of Britain through Time "Knowsley Kirkby Profile"

== Economy ==
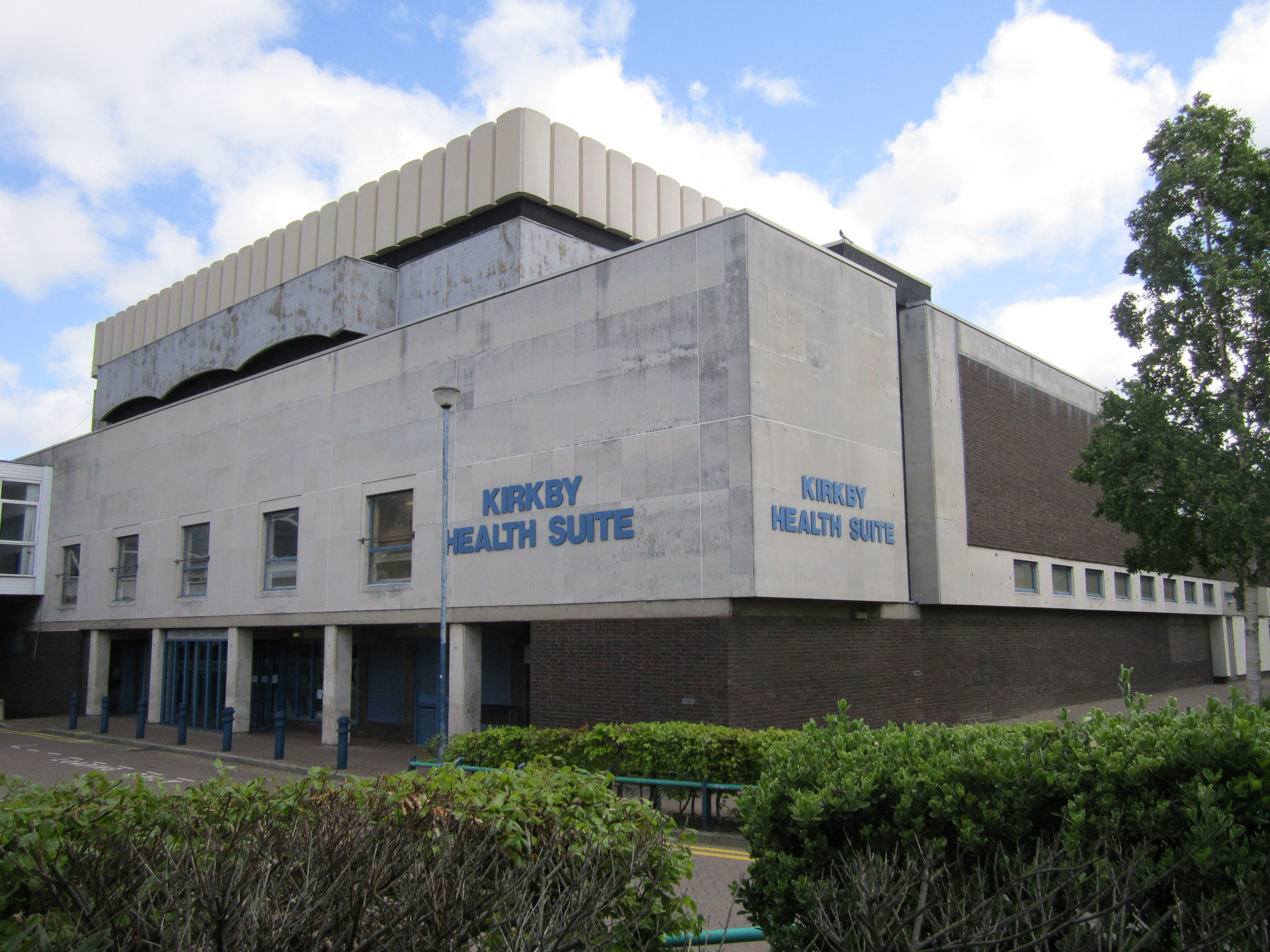
Kirkby Health Suite

Kirkby Industrial Estate, formerly ROF Kirkby, is still a large employer. The town's industrial heritage, however, has largely faded away as service industries replace factories. Major employers include QVC and Barclaycard, and several call centre companies are based in Kirkby.

=== Regeneration ===
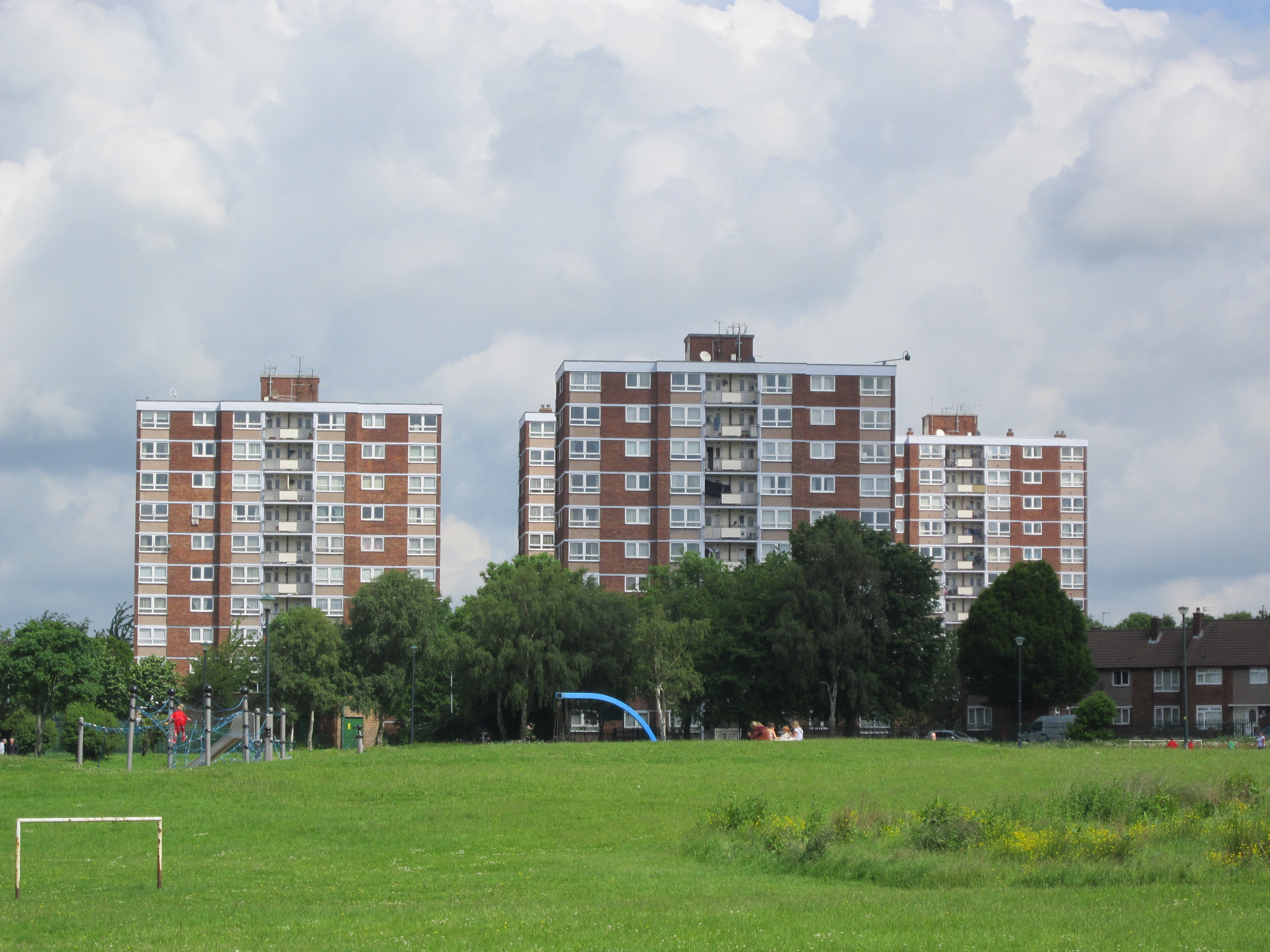
High-rise flats in Southdene

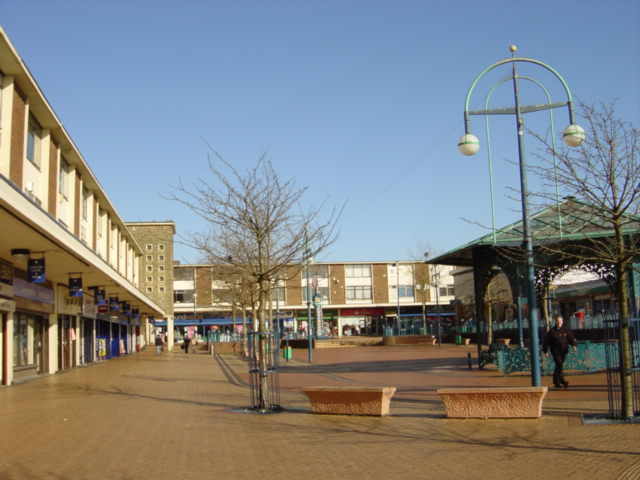
Kirkby Town Centre

Kirkby has seen regeneration efforts. The Kirkby Sports Centre, one of the region's main velodromes and athletic centres, was replaced in 2007 by a leisure facility without a track. Several new stores have opened.

The regeneration began in December 2006, when a proposal was made by Tesco and Everton F.C. for redevelopment of the town centre which included a 50,000-seat football stadium and retail outlets. The proposal was known as The Kirkby Project. Kirkby Market was redeveloped, and reopened on 26 April 2014.

In 2015, the town centre owned by Tesco was bought by St. Modwen Properties for £35.8 million. St Modwen announced their plans for the regeneration of the town centre, including a cinema, a supermarket, parking, and leisure development. This led to reports that two supermarkets were competing to build a store; it was rumoured that one of the stores was ASDA. A public hearing was held for local businesses, shopkeepers and residents in October 2016. St, Modwen submitted a revised application for the town-centre scheme to include food-store anchor Morrisons, who submitted the winning bid.

==== Tesco plans ====
Reports suggested that local support for the Tesco/Everton F.C. scheme appeared to be tempered by concern about the stadium's effect on residents. In 2012, the Knowsley council decided to invest £5 million to replace the multi-purpose Kirkby Civic Suite with the Kirkby Centre. The centre would include a library, a gallery and a local-history archive.

==== St. Modwen plans ====
After the collapse of Tesco's plans for Kirkby Town Centre, regeneration halted until St. Modwen Properties acquired the town centre in October 2015. St. Modwen planned a multi-million-pound retail-led regeneration in partnership with Knowsley Metropolitan Borough Council. They planned to develop and expand the retail centre, complementing Tesco's existing offer and providing housing on a 65-acre site the town centre. Refurbishment began in June 2016, and was planned to take eight weeks. In October, St. Modwen announced 24 November as the date for Kirkby's Christmas lights switch-on.

Costa Coffee agreed in February 2017 to open a store in the town centre. In September, St. Modwen confirmed that Morrisons would open a 45,000-square-foot supermarket in the town centre. The following month, St. Modwen held an information event with the community about their proposed plans. According to the company, work would begin in 2018 and end in 2019. The planning application was granted in November 2019. In June 2018, St. Modwen reported that Home Bargains and fast food restaurant KFC would open in the town centre.

==== Council intervention ====
When the promised development was delayed, Knowsley council leader Graham Morgan said: "Despite our best efforts, the redevelopment of the town centre still hasn't happened and it's quite clear that we need to find a different model. The people of Kirkby deserve more than this. We have worked closely to encourage St. Modwen to push on with their plans but, despite major names already being signed up, they remain extremely cautious and have still not confirmed a start date. We have waited too long and it's time to move on." The council's cabinet endorsed a plan for the council to purchase St. Modwen's holdings in Kirkby Town Centre, including the shopping centre and the Knowsley College site on Cherryfield Drive. The college plans to move to the town centre.

== Transport ==
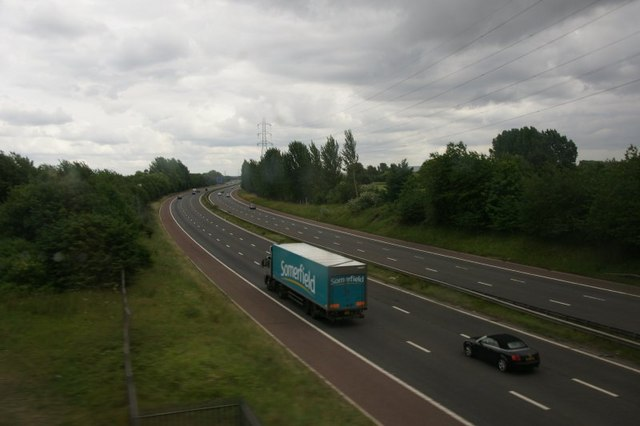
The M57 motorway near Kirkby

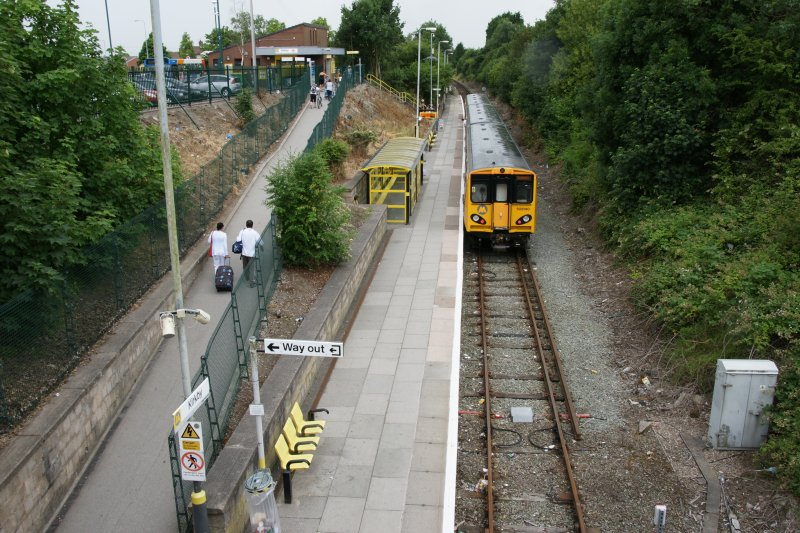
Kirkby Railway Station

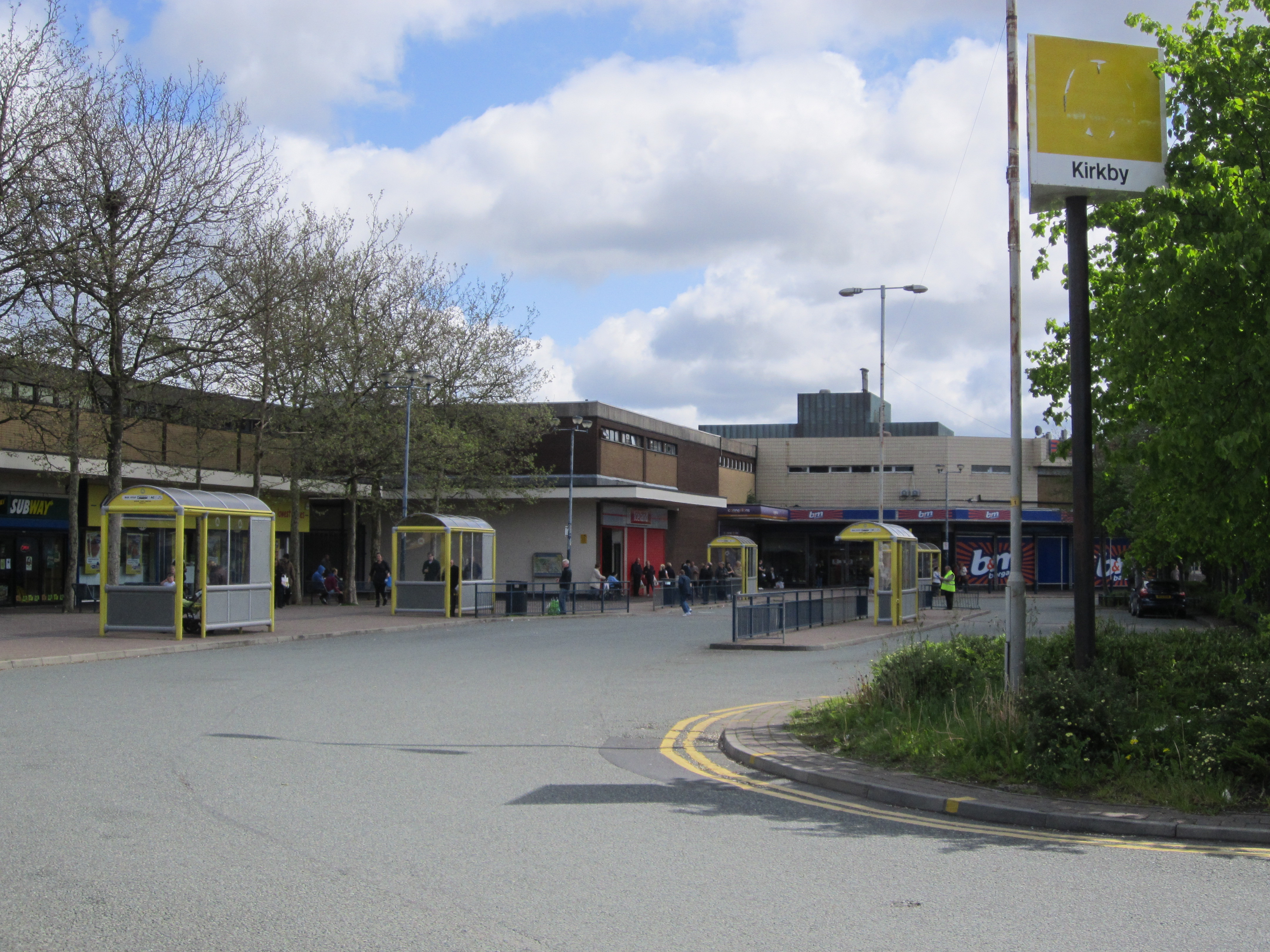
Bus station

=== Road ===
The main motorways that connect the town are the M57 motorway, which runs adjacent to the town, and M58 motorway, which connects just north of the town. However, the town also has other major roads that connect it, such as East Lancashire Road and the A506.

=== Rail ===
Alongside road connections, Kirkby also has a few rail links, with Kirkby railway station and Headbolt Lane railway station offering frequent trains to Liverpool, and Headbolt Lane offering an hourly service to Wigan, Manchester and Blackburn (via Rainford).

=== Buses ===
Buses in the town and the wider region are managed by Merseytravel, are run by several different companies, mainly Arriva North West and Stagecoach South Lancashire and Merseyside.

== Education ==
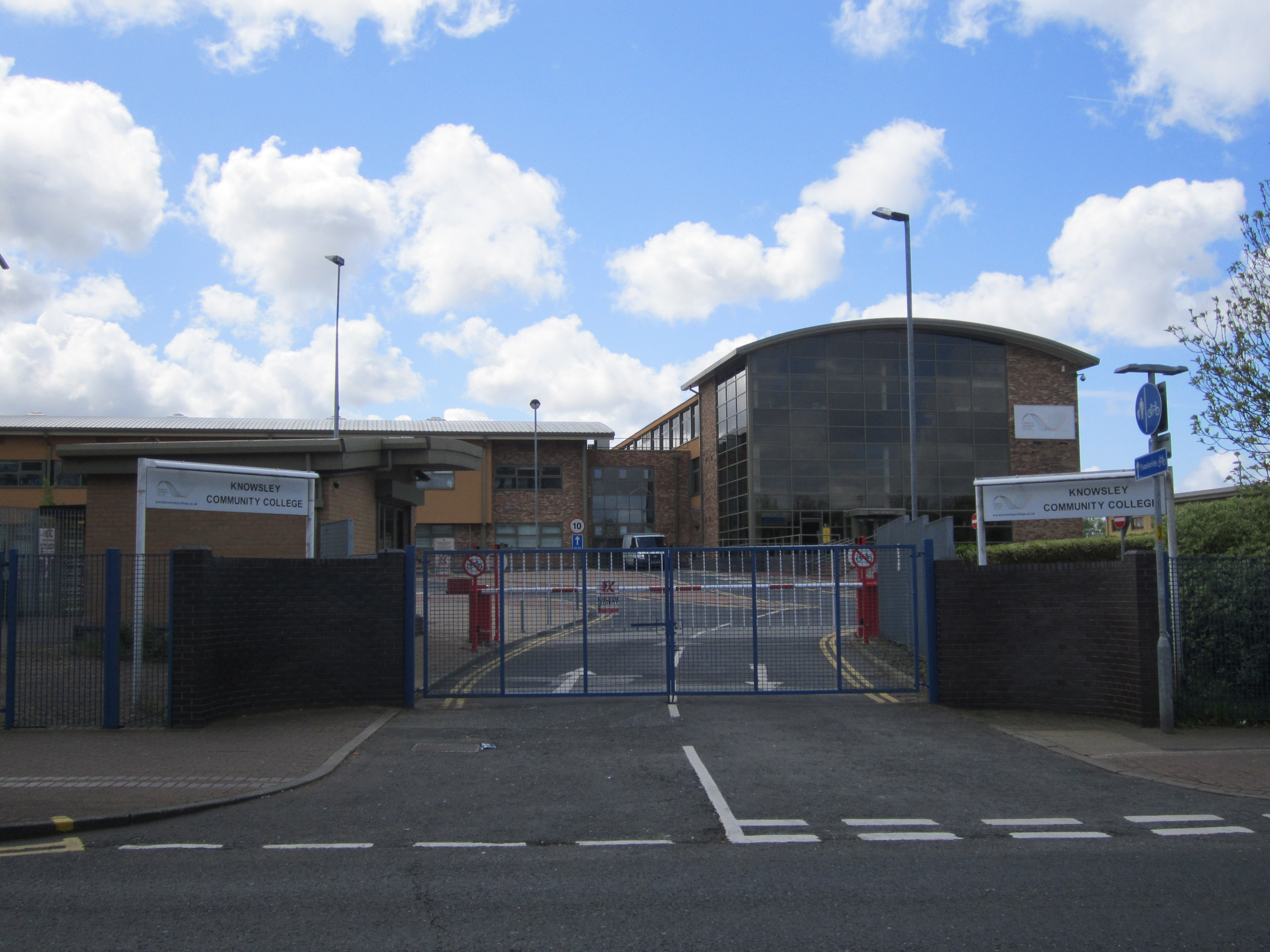
Knowsley Community College

Primary secular, Church of England, and Roman Catholic education is available. At the secondary level, secular and Roman Catholic education is available. Educational services are provided or monitored by the Knowsley local education authority.

Kirkby has 11 primary schools; Northwood Community Primary School is the newest and largest. Kirkby High School and All Saints Catholic High School were formed after the town's three secondary schools closed. Ruffwood and Brookfield, due to merge in September 2009, merged a year early when Ruffwood was designated a failing school in an Ofsted report. After the shake-up, All Saints Catholic High School and the Kirkby Sports College Center for Learning emerged. On 1 September 2013, Kirkby Sports College became an academy and was relaunched as Kirkby High School.

Higher education is provided by Knowsley Community College, with its main campus in Kirkby Town Centre. The college has an annual intake of over 12,000.

== Houses of worship ==
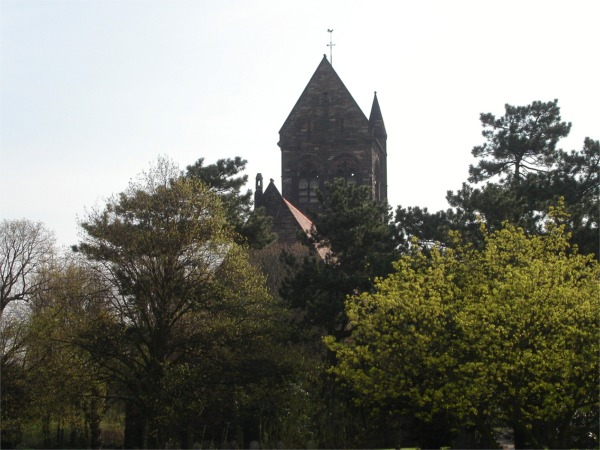
St Chad's Church

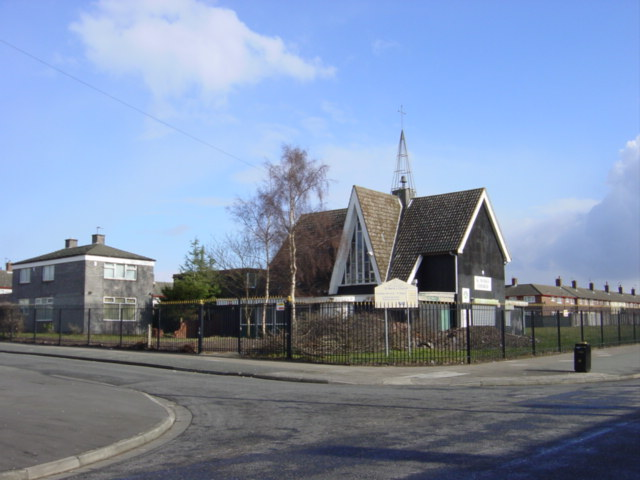
St Marks Church

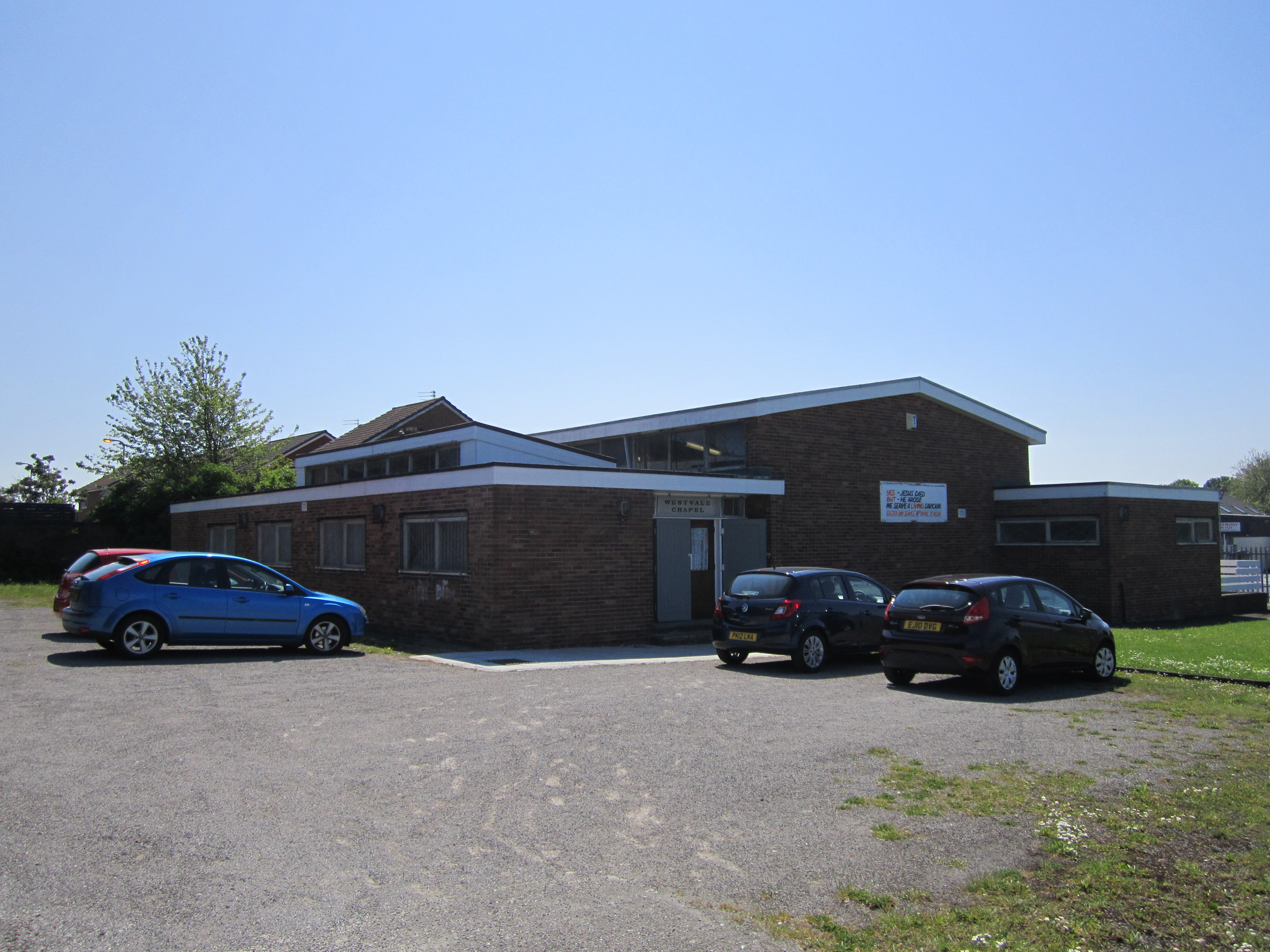
Westvale Chapel

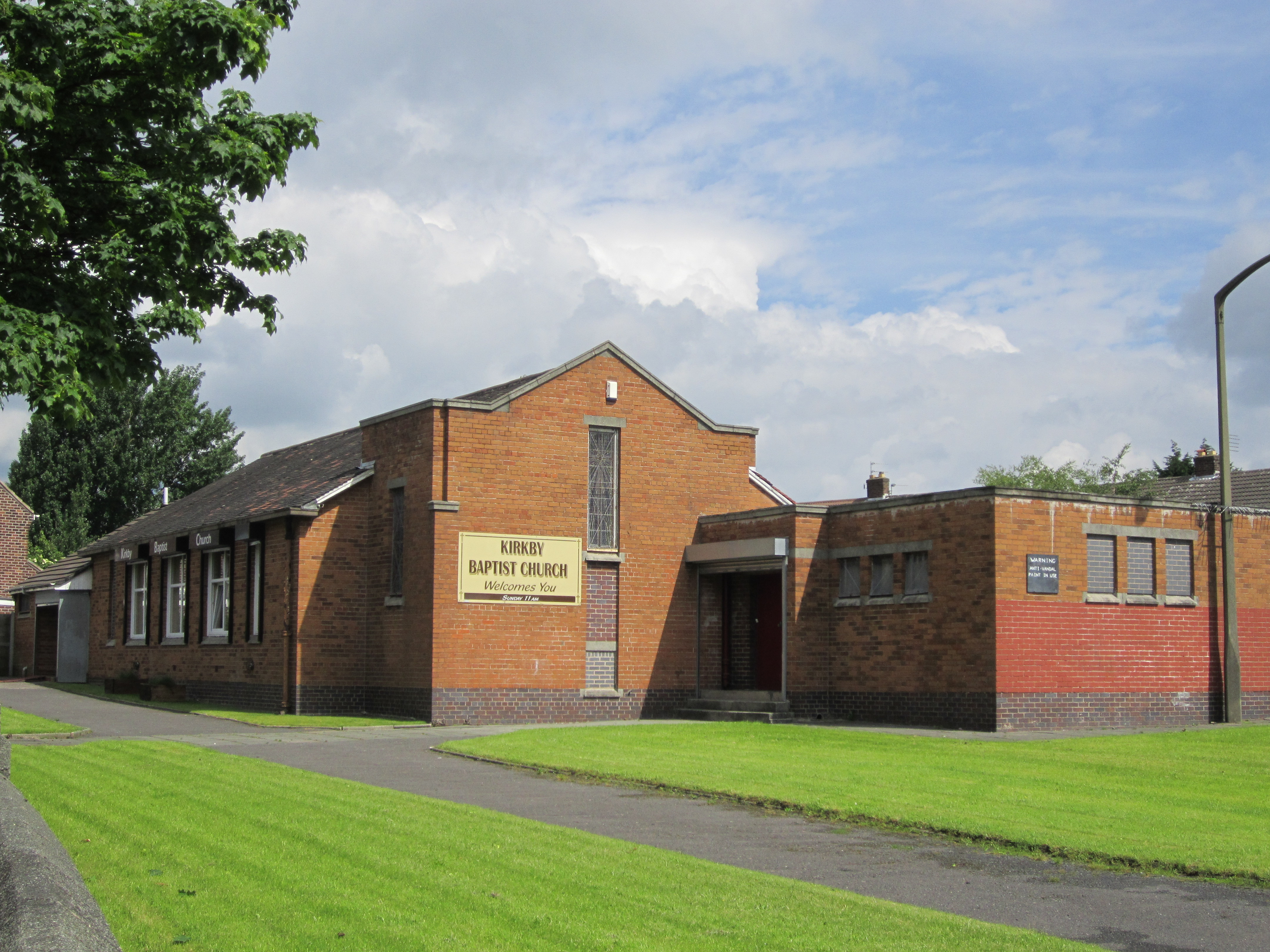
Kirkby Baptist Church

St Chad's Church, was built during the 19th century on the site of a church noted in the Domesday Book. Other churches are St Michael's and All Angels Roman Catholic Church; St Mark's, St Andrews and St Martin's Churches (Church of England), St Mary, Mother of God and St Joseph's Roman Catholic Churches, Kirkby Baptist Church, St Peter & Paul RC Church, Northwood Chapel, Kirkby Christian Fellowship, Lifegate Church and the Kingdom Hall of Jehovah's Witnesses.

== Sports and recreation ==
Kirkby is home to the training ground and youth academy of Liverpool F.C. The youth academy was built in 1998 on the site previously used for Kirkby Town F.C.'s ground located on Simonswood Lane; the plans to move Liverpool F.C.'s full training ground to the same location were announced in 2018 and the move was completed during the international break in November 2020. The town's former football club Kirkby Town, was later renamed Knowsley United and was dissolved in 1997. The most widely supported football teams in Kirkby are Liverpool F.C. and Everton F.C., reflecting the town's proximity to Liverpool and historically that a large proportion of the town's residents moved from Liverpool to the town after World War Two.

During the 1970s, Kirkby was home to an artificial ski slope. Work started on the slope in 1973 and it was intended to open in 1975, however, the project was abandoned in autumn 1975 over fears it was not safe. Investigations by the Liverpool Free Press revealed a considerable degree of corruption in the sourcing of materials and building of the slope. Police investigations later led to a former council leader and former council architect being jailed over their involvement in the project.

Kirkby does have its own local football club, F.C. Kirkby, which as of the 26/27 season play in the West Cheshire Association Football League 1st Division.

== Services ==
Law enforcement is provided by Merseyside Police, whose basic command unit in the borough of Knowsley has a Kirkby station on St Chad's Drive. Public transport is co-ordinated by Merseytravel. Fire and rescue services are provided by the Merseyside Fire and Rescue Service, which has a Kirkby station on Webster Drive.

Waste management is co-ordinated by the Merseyside Recycling and Waste Authority. Kirkby's distribution network operator for electricity is United Utilities; there are no power stations in the town. United Utilities also manages Kirkby's drinking and wastewater. SUEZ Recycling & Recovery UK process Merseyside and Halton's waste at a rail loading transfer station in Kirkby. The waste is transported from Kirkby to Wilton in Teesside where it is used to generate electricity. Power generated at Wilton is sufficient to power every home in Knowsley.

Kirkby is served by the Knowsley PCT, and Aintree University Hospital is the nearest hospital. The town has nine GP surgeries and four dental practices. Ambulance service is provided by the North West Ambulance Service, with a station in Kirkby.

BT Group's Simonswood exchange provides local telephone and ADSL Internet service to the area, with a number of other companies offering services through local-loop unbundling. Virgin Media services are also available to the town, providing television, telephone and cable Internet access.

== Media ==
The main local newspaper is the Liverpool Echo. The Kirkby Extra and the Knowsley Challenge are free local newspapers. Local radio stations are BBC Radio Merseyside, Heart North West, Capital Liverpool, Hits Radio Liverpool, Smooth North West and Greatest Hits Radio Liverpool & The North West. Local news and television programmes are provided by BBC North West and ITV Granada, the local television station TalkLiverpool also broadcasts to the area. Television signals are received from the Winter Hill TV transmitter.

== Filmography ==
Kirkby and Seaforth were the bases for the fictional Newtown of the 1960s BBC TV series, Z-Cars.

Behind the Rent Strike is a 1974 documentary by Nick Broomfield documenting a 14-month rent strike in Kirkby by 3,000 social housing tenants protesting poor housing and rent increases triggered by the Housing Finance Act of 1972.

The 1985 film Letter to Brezhnev was shot in Liverpool, with scenes filmed in Kirkby. The film starred Margi Clarke, who was born in the town.

== Notable people ==
=== Footballers ===
- Dennis Mortimer - Captained Aston Villa to the 1982 European Cup final
- Phil Thompson- Captained Liverpool FC to the 1981 European Cup final.
- Mike Marsh - Former Liverpool and Southend United player, Liverpool coach, and national under-17 coach
- Leighton Baines – Everton player, formerly of Wigan Athletic
- Aaron McGowan - Kilmarnock F.C. player
- Jamie Jones – Middlesbrough player
- Phil Boersma – Former Liverpool player
- Tommy Caton – former Manchester City, Arsenal, and Oxford United player
- Paul Cook – Former Wigan Athletic manager and former Wigan Athletic and Tranmere Rovers player
- Alan Dugdale – Former Coventry City, Charlton Athletic and Barnsley player
- Ken Dugdale – Former Wigan Athletic player and New Zealand national team manager
- Alan Stubbs – Former Bolton Wanderers, Everton and Celtic player, and current Rotherham United manager
- Terry McDermott – Former Liverpool and Newcastle United player
- Rickie Lambert - Former West Bromwich Albion and Liverpool player
- Craig Noone - Cardiff City F.C. player
- Phil Edwards - Burton Albion F.C. player, former Accrington Stanley F.C. player
- Jimmy Redfern - Former Bolton Wanderers F.C. and Chester City F.C. player
- Gary Bennett - Former Kirkby Town, Skelmersdale United F.C., Wigan Athletic, Chester City F.C., Wrexham A.F.C., Tranmere Rovers F.C. and Preston North End F.C. player
- George Donnelly - Former Tranmere Rovers player
- Michelle Hinnigan - Former Everton L.F.C. player
- Steve Torpey - Former Prescot Cables F.C., F.C. United of Manchester AFC Telford United, and Fleetwood Town F.C. player. Scored F.C. United of Manchester's first goal in a friendly match against Flixton F.C.
- Mark Hughes - Accrington Stanley F.C. player, former Everton player
- John Coleman - Accrington Stanley manager
- Ryan Taylor - Former Newcastle United F.C. player
- Connor Randall Former Liverpool player, current Ross County F.C. player
- Danny Coid – Former Blackpool F.C. player

=== Other sports figures ===
- John Conteh - 1970 Commonwealth Games middleweight boxing gold medalist, former WBC light heavyweight champion
- Paul Hodkinson - Former WBC featherweight boxing champion
- Joey "The Jab" Singleton - British champion boxer

=== Others ===
- Nicky Allt - Playwright, author, producer
- Aiden Byrne – youngest Michelin Award chef
- Alan Bleasdale – playwright
- Andrew Schofield – actor
- Bobby Schofield – actor
- China Crisis – new wave and synth-pop band
- Craig Colton – finalist on The X Factor 2011
- James Bulger - murder victim
- Margi Clarke – actress
- Peter Augustine Baines - Benedictine, titular bishop of Siga and Vicar Apostolic of the Western District of England
- Robert Atherton – poet
- Sharon Maughan – actress
- Stephen Graham – actor
- Steve Rotheram - Mayor of the Liverpool City Region
- Tony Jones – bass player in The Christians
- Tony Maudsley – actor
- Tricia Penrose – actress

== See also ==
- Listed buildings in Kirkby
