= St Chad's Church, Kirkby =

Coordinates: 53.4843°N 2.8931°W

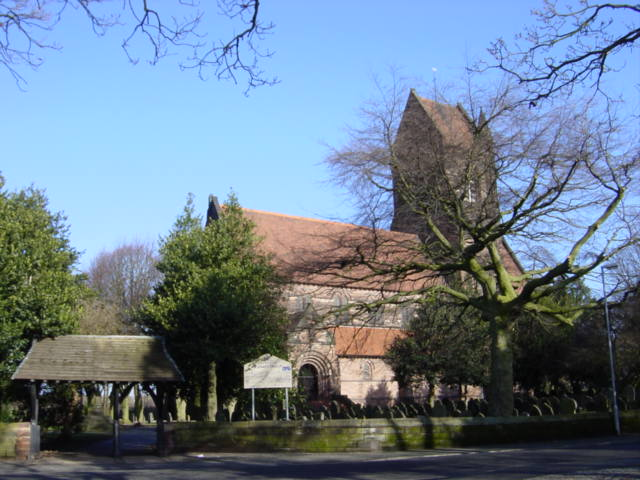
- St Chad's Church, Kirkby, from the southwest

- Location in Merseyside
- OS grid reference: SJ 408,990
- Location: Old Hall Lane, Kirkby, Knowsley, Merseyside
- Country: England
- Denomination: Anglican
- Website: St Chad, Kirkby

History
- Status: Parish church
- Dedication: Saint Chad

Architecture
- Functional status: Active
- Heritage designation: Grade II*
- Designated: 20 June 1975
- Architect: Paley and Austin
- Architectural type: Church
- Style: Norman Revival, Gothic Revival
- Groundbreaking: 1869
- Completed: 1871
- Construction cost: £20,000

Specifications
- Materials: Sandstone, tiled roofs

Administration
- Province: York
- Diocese: Liverpool
- Archdeaconry: Liverpool
- Deanery: Huyton
- Parish: St Chad, Kirkby

Clergy
- Rector: Revd Jeremy Fagan
- Vicar: Revd Philippa Lee

St Chad's Church is in Old Hall Lane, Kirkby, Knowsley, Merseyside, England. It is an active Anglican parish church in the deanery of Huyton, the archdeaconry of Liverpool, and the diocese of Liverpool. Its benefice is united with those of St Mark, Kirkby: St Martin, Southdene, Kirkby: and Tower Hill, St Andrew, Kirkby. The church is recorded in the National Heritage List for England as a designated Grade II* listed building.

== History ==
The church has an ancient foundation, preceding the Norman Conquest of 1066, and a church on the site is recorded in the Domesday Book of 1086. This church was replaced in 1766 by a Georgian chapel. This was replaced in turn by the present church that was built between 1869 and 1871. It was designed by the Lancaster architects Paley and Austin. The initial estimate was for £10,000, but the cost rose to £12,000 (equivalent to £1,220,000 in 2025), and was paid for by the 4th Earl of Sefton. It provided seating for 650 people. The stone used for its construction was taken from the Earl's own quarries.

== Architecture ==
=== Exterior ===
St Chad's is constructed in red sandstone with tiled roofs. Its design incorporates features of Norman and Gothic architecture. The plan consists of a six-bay nave with a clerestory, north and south porches, north and south aisles, a short chancel with an organ loft to the north and a chapel to the south, and a tower at the crossing. The tower is in three stages with a saddleback roof. At the southeast corner of the tower is an octagonal stair turret with a conical slated roof. At the west end of the church, the aisles have single lancet windows, and the nave has a triple lancet. Most of the windows elsewhere in the church are also lancets. Both of the doorways are Norman in style; the north doorway is blocked, and the south doorway is ornately carved.

=== Interior ===
Inside the church, the arcades have pointed arches and Corinthian capitals; the piers of the north arcade are octagonal, those of the south are round. The font is early Norman, and is carved with figures, including Adam and Eve, and Saint Michael spearing a serpent. The font is considered to be the oldest man-made article in Kirkby. On the east wall of the church is an opus sectile reredos of 1898, designed by Henry Holiday and depicting the Last Supper. Also in the chancel is an arched sedilia with a carved scene in its tympanum. Holiday also designed most of the stained-glass windows, which date from 1871 to 1897.

== External features ==
The churchyard contains the war graves of a soldier of World War I, and another of World War II.

== See also ==
- Grade II* listed buildings in Merseyside
- Listed buildings in Kirkby
- List of ecclesiastical works by Paley and Austin
