= Alex Gibson (footballer, born 1982) =

English footballer

Personal information
- Full name: Alexander Jonathan Gibson
- Date of birth: 12 August 1982 (age 44)
- Place of birth: Plymouth, England
- Height: 5 ft 10 in (1.78 m)
- Position: Defender

Youth career
- 2000–2001: Stoke City

Senior career*
| Years | Team | Apps | (Gls) |
| 2001–2002 | Port Vale | 1 | (0) |
| 2002–2003 | Stafford Rangers | | |
| 2003–2005 | Hednesford Town | 37 | (0) |
| 2007–2008 | Droylsden | | |
| 2008 | Stafford Rangers | | |
- * Club domestic league appearances and goals

Alexander Jonathan Gibson (born 12 August 1982) is an English former footballer who played for Port Vale, Stafford Rangers, Hednesford Town, and Droylsden.

== Career ==
Gibson started his career with Stoke City but moved onto local rivals Port Vale in June 2001. He made his senior debut for the "Valiants" on 10 October, in a League One 1–1 draw at Chesterfield. He went on to play 45 minutes of a Football League Trophy win over Carlisle United. He left league football at the end of the season on a free transfer to nearby Stafford Rangers.

After a spell with Hednesford Town, making 28 appearances in the 2003–04 season and featuring nine ties in the 2004–05 campaign, he signed with Droylsden at the end of the 2006–07 season. He returned to Rangers after being released by Droyslden in February 2008, but was unable to prevent their slip into the Conference North and left in August of that year.

== Career statistics ==
Appearances and goals by club, season and competition
| Club | Season | League | | | FA Cup | | Other | | Total | |
| Club | Season | Division | Apps | Goals | Apps | Goals | Apps | Goals | Apps | Goals |
|---|---|---|---|---|---|---|---|---|---|---|
| Port Vale | 2001–02 | Second Division | 1 | 0 | 0 | 0 | 1 | 0 | 2 | 0 |
| Hednesford Town | 2003–04 | Southern League Premier Division | | | | | | | 28 | 0 |
| Hednesford Town | 2004–05 | Southern League Premier Division | | | | | | | 9 | 0 |
| Hednesford Town | Total | | | | | | | | 37 | 0 |
