= Steve Torpey (footballer, born 1981) =

English footballer

Personal information
- Full name: Stephen Robert Torpey
- Date of birth: 16 September 1981 (age 45)
- Place of birth: Kirkby, England
- Height: 5 ft 9 in (1.75 m)
- Position: Forward

Youth career
- 1995–2001: Liverpool

Senior career*
Years	Team	Apps	(Gls)
2001–2002	Port Vale	1	(0)
2001	→ Scarborough (loan)	0	(0)
2002–2004	Prescot Cables		
2004–2005	Altrincham		
2005	Prescot Cables		
2005	Atherton Laburnum Rovers		
2005–2006	FC United of Manchester	29	(13)
2006–2008	Halifax Town		
2008	→ Stalybridge Celtic (loan)	13	(7)
2008–2009	Stalybridge Celtic	40	(11)
2009	AFC Telford United		
2009–2010	Fleetwood Town		
2010–2011	FC United of Manchester	18	(3)
- * Club domestic league appearances and goals

Stephen Robert Torpey (born 16 September 1981) is an English football coach and former player who now the Academy director at Premier League club Manchester United.

A forward, he played one game in the English Football League for Port Vale in 2001. Also, he played in the Conference National for Halifax Town between 2006 and 2008. He also played once for Scarborough. Also, he turned out for lower non-League sides Prescot Cables, Altrincham, Atherton Laburnum Rovers, FC United of Manchester, Stalybridge Celtic, AFC Telford United, and Fleetwood Town. He then went into coaching with Liverpool, Manchester City, Brentford and Manchester United.

== Playing career ==
A versatile forward, Torpey started as a Liverpool trainee, spending six years there and representing England at schoolboy level before moving to Second Division Port Vale in 2001. He made his debut for the "Valiants" on 1 September 2001, replacing George O'Callaghan 57 minutes into a 2–0 defeat to Reading at Vale Park. In October, he was loaned out to Conference National side Scarborough. He played in one Football League Trophy game before returning to Burslem.

He moved to Prescot Cables of the North West Counties League in 2002, helping the club to win two promotions in as many years, leaving them in the Northern Premier League Premier Division. On 2 October 2004, he joined Altrincham in the Conference North but had his time at Moss Lane disrupted by a hamstring injury and a bout of pleurisy. He moved back to Prescot in February 2005. In March 2005 he signed dual forms enabling him also to play for Atherton Laburnum Rovers. At the end of 2004–05, Cables lost out to Workington at the play-off semi-final stage.

In 2005, he joined the newly formed FC United of Manchester, a club formed by fans in protest to the Glazer ownership of Manchester United. He scored the club's first-ever goal in a friendly match against Flixton in August 2005. After a successful first season, in which the club won promotion out of North West Counties League Division Two, he moved into the Conference in August 2006 with Halifax Town. He played 27 games for Halifax throughout the 2006–07 campaign, scoring seven goals. He played 24 games in 2007–08, scoring two goals, before he left the Shay in February 2008 after being told he was not going to be given a new contract. He joined Conference North side Stalybridge Celtic on loan, and joined the club permanently in the summer. He scored 20 goals in 62 games for the club in all competitions, including an appearance in the 2008 play-off final defeat to Barrow. At the end of the 2008–09 season, Torpey signed for Conference North rivals Telford United. After just months at Telford, they agreed to sell him to Fleetwood Town Fleetwood were promoted at the end of 2009–10, after beating Alfreton Town in the play-offs.

In summer 2010, he played for F.C. United of Manchester, now in the Northern Premier League Premier Division, again in pre-season friendlies but was not named in the 21 player squad for the 2010–11 season by the club, as he was still considering offers from various clubs in higher leagues. It was announced on 28 August that he had re-signed for the club. He left the club in October 2011 after repeated injury problems, having had his registration released by manager Karl Marginson.

== Coaching career ==
Torpey worked as a coach with Liverpool's youth teams, working with a range of age groups over six years, finishing with the role of Head of Foundation phase and U11 lead coach. He took up a similar position at Manchester City in 2014 (Foundation Phase Co-Ordinator / U11 Lead Coach). Since then, Torpey has progressed through the academy system at City, becoming Head of Coaching u9-u12 before taking on the role of Head of Coaching u15-u23 in August 2020, overseeing the club's first Premier League 2, u18 Premier League North, U18 Premier League National play-off and FA Youth Cup wins in his first season. He joined Brentford as Academy director in January 2024. He took up the same post at Manchester United in August 2025.

== Career statistics ==
Appearances and goals by club, season and competition
Club	Season	League			FA Cup		Other		Total	
Club	Season	Division	Apps	Goals	Apps	Goals	Apps	Goals	Apps	Goals
Port Vale	2001–02	Second Division	1	0	0	0	0	0	1	0
F.C. United of Manchester	2005–06	North West Counties Division Two	29	13	0	0	3	4	32	17
Stalybridge Celtic (loan)	2007–08	Conference North	13	7	0	0	3	0	16	7
Stalybridge Celtic	2008–09	Conference North	40	11	2	1	4	1	46	13
Stalybridge Celtic	Total		53	18	2	1	7	1	62	20
F.C. United of Manchester	2010–11	Northern Premier League Premier Division	8	0	0	0	0	0	8	0
F.C. United of Manchester	2011–12	Northern Premier League Premier Division	10	3	1	0	1	1	12	4
F.C. United of Manchester	Total		18	3	1	0	1	1	20	4

== Honours ==
Prescot Cables

- North West Counties Football League: 2002–03
- Northern Premier League First Division promotion: 2003–04

F.C. United of Manchester

- North West Counties Football League Division Two: 2005–06
