= Paul Donnelly (footballer) =

English footballer and coach

Personal information
- Full name: Paul Michael Donnelly
- Date of birth: 16 February 1981 (age 45)
- Place of birth: Newcastle-under-Lyme, England
- Height: 5 ft 7 in (1.70 m)
- Position: Defender

Youth career
- Port Vale

Senior career*
Years	Team	Apps	(Gls)
1998–2002	Port Vale	11	(0)
2002–2005	Stone Dominoes		
2005–2008	Nantwich Town		
2008	Witton Albion		
2009–2011	Newcastle Town		
2011–2012	Stafford Rangers		
2012–2013	Kidsgrove Athletic		
2013–2015	Leek Town	50	(0)
2015–2016	Kidsgrove Athletic		
- * Club domestic league appearances and goals

Paul Michael Donnelly (born 16 February 1981) is an English former football player and coach.

A defender, he played eleven games in the Football League for Port Vale between 1998 and 2002. Following this, he played non-League football for Stone Dominoes until 2005, at which point he signed with Nantwich Town. Three years later, he signed with Newcastle Town via Witton Albion. He moved on to Stafford Rangers in 2011 before joining Kidsgrove Athletic the following year. He signed with Leek Town in July 2013 before returning to Kidsgrove Athletic in May 2015. In June 2016, he returned to Leek Town as an assistant manager to Anthony Danylyk before following Danylyk to Belper Town 12 months later.

== Playing career ==
Donnelly graduated through the Port Vale youth team, and turned professional under Brian Horton. He made four First Division appearances in the 1999–2000 relegation season and featured once in the Second Division in 2000–01, before he was released from Vale Park after playing eight league and cup games in 2001–02. He dropped out of the Football League in July 2002 to sign for Stone Dominoes of the North West Counties Football League. In his first season with the club, they won promotion to the First Division as runners-up of the Second Division. He stayed for three years before joining Nantwich Town in 2005. With Nantwich, he lifted the FA Vase in 2006 following a 3–1 win over Hillingdon Borough at St Andrew's. He also helped the club win promotion out of the Northern Premier League Division One South, following a penalty shoot-out win over Sheffield in the 2008 play-off final. They also won the Cheshire Senior Cup that same year after a penalty shoot-out victory over Altrincham. He played 95 games before joining Witton Albion three years later. He scored one goal in 23 games for Witton in the 2008–09 season.

In December 2008 he signed with Newcastle Town. He impressed at Town, winning the attention of Kidsgrove Athletic, however, the Newcastle captain turned down the chance to play at a higher level, instead choosing to stay with Town. In 2009–10 his side won promotion to the Northern Premier League Division One South, after finishing top of the North West Counties Football League Premier Division. Town finished 24 points clear of second place New Mills. In 2010–11, he led Town to a second-place finish, though they lost 3–0 to Grantham Town in the play-off semi-finals.

In 2011, he joined Northern Premier League Premier Division side Stafford Rangers, whilst also working as an administrator at Staffordshire University. He captained Rangers to a 16th-place finish in 2011–12. He left the club in May 2012. Two months later, he signed with Kidsgrove Athletic. He helped "Kiddy" to an 18th-place finish in the Northern Premier League Division One South in 2012–13. He signed with league rivals Leek Town in July 2013. He helped the "Blues" to secure a play-off spot with a third-place finish in 2013–14, where they were knocked out by Belper Town at Harrison Park. They again reached the play-offs in 2014–15, losing to Sutton Coldfield Town in the final.

Donnelley re-joined Kidsgrove Athletic in May 2015 after being signed by manager Peter Ward. Kidsgrove finished in 15th place in 2015–16.

== Coaching career ==
Donnelley joined Leek Town as manager Anthony Danylyk's assistant in May 2016. In June 2017, he followed Danylyk to Leek's Northern Premier League Division One South rivals Belper Town. The pair left the club five months later, citing a change in personal circumstances.

== Career statistics ==
Appearances and goals by club, season and competition
Club	Season	League			FA Cup		Other		Total	
Club	Season	Division	Apps	Goals	Apps	Goals	Apps	Goals	Apps	Goals
Port Vale	1999–2000	First Division	4	0	0	0	0	0	4	0
Port Vale	2000–01	Second Division	1	0	0	0	0	0	1	0
Port Vale	2001–02	Second Division	6	0	0	0	2	0	8	0
Port Vale	Total		11	0	0	0	2	0	13	0
Witton Albion	2008–09	Northern Premier League; Premier Division							23	1
Leek Town	2013–14	Northern Premier League; Division One South	24	0	2	0	6	0	32	0
Leek Town	2014–15	Northern Premier League; Division One South	26	0	3	1	8	0	37	1
Leek Town	Total		50	0	5	1	14	0	69	1

== Honours ==
Stone Dominoes

- North West Counties Football League Division Two second-place promotion: 2002–03

Nantwich Town

- FA Vase: 2006
- Cheshire Senior Cup: 2008
- Northern Premier League Division One South play-offs: 2008

Newcastle Town

- North West Counties Football League Premier Division: 2009–10
