= 2003–04 Shrewsbury Town F.C. season =

Shrewsbury Town
2003–04 season
- Chairman: Roland Wycherley
- Player-manager: Jimmy Quinn
- Ground: Gay Meadow
- Football Conference: 3rd
- Play-offs: Winners (promoted)
- FA Cup: First round
- League Trophy: First round
- FA Trophy: Quarter-finals
- Top goalscorer: League: Luke Rodgers (13); All: Luke Rodgers (15)
- Highest home attendance: 7,012 (3 May 2004) vs Barnet
- Lowest home attendance: 2,869 (20 April 2004) vs Ebbsfleet United
- Average home league attendance: 4,007
- Biggest win: 4–1 / 3–0
- Biggest defeat: 0–5

The 2003–04 season was the 108th season of competitive association football and first season in the Football Conference played by Shrewsbury Town Football Club, a professional football club based in Shrewsbury, Shropshire, England. Their twenty-fourth-place finish in 2002–03 Football League Third Division meant they were relegated from The Football League – fifty-three years after they joined it – and were playing their first season in Football Conference. The season began on 1 July 2003 and concluded on 30 June 2004.

Jimmy Quinn, who was starting his first full season as player-manager, signed eight players before the summer transfer window closed. Shrewsbury occupied a play-off position for most of the season, and finished the Football Conference season in third place, failing to reach the automatic promotion place but securing a berth in the play-offs. Shrewsbury beat Barnet 5–3 in a penalty shoot-out in the semi-final having drawn 2–2 on aggregate. They won the 2004 Football Conference play-off final, which took place at the Britannia Stadium, by beating Aldershot Town 3–0 on penalties after the match ended in a 1–1 draw; which meant the club was promoted back into The Football League in the newly renamed Football League Two. They lost in their opening round matches in both the 2003–04 FA Cup and Football League Cup, and were eliminated in the quarter-finals of the FA Trophy.

Thirty players made at least one appearance in nationally organised first-team competition, and there were fifteen different goalscorers. Goalkeeper Scott Howie and defenders David Ridler and Darren Tinson missed only five of the fifty-one competitive matches played over the season. Luke Rodgers finished as leading scorer with fifteen goals, of which thirteen came in league competition and two came in the play-offs.

== Background and pre-season ==
In April 2003 Kevin Ratcliffe resigned as manager of Shrewsbury Town, four years after taking the position, he took responsibility for the club's poor run of where only two league games were won after the turn of the year and their relegation from The Football League was confirmed. Player Mark Atkins was placed in charge for the final game of the season against his original club Scunthorpe United at home which ended in a 2–1 defeat. Released following the end of the 2002–03 season were Nigel Jemson, Peter Wilding, Andy Thompson, Jason van Blerk, Scott Partridge, Nick Evans and Chris Courtney. Andy Tretton, Josh Walker, Greg Rioch, Steve Guinan and Chris Murphy also left the club after departing for Hereford United, Moor Green, Northwich Victoria, Hereford United and Telford United respectively.

Jimmy Quinn was announced as Shrewsbury's manager before the start of the 2003–04 season. New signings ahead of the start of the season comprised five defenders and one of each of the other positions: goalkeeper Scott Howie from Bristol Rovers, midfielder Martin O'Connor from Walsall and forward Colin Cramb from Fortuna Sittard. The five defenders were Ian Fitzpatrick from Halifax Town, David Ridler from Scarborough, Darren Tinson from Macclesfield Town and both Jake Sedgemore and Greg Rioch from Northwich Victoria.

== Summary and aftermath ==
Final Football Conference table (part)
Pos	Team	P	W	D	L	GF	GA	GD	Pts
1	Chester City	42	27	11	4	85	34	+51	92
2	Hereford United	42	28	7	7	103	44	+59	91
3	Shrewsbury Town	42	20	14	8	67	42	+25	74
4	Barnet	42	19	14	9	60	46	+14	71
5	Aldershot Town	42	20	10	12	80	67	+13	70

Shrewsbury spent the whole of the season in the top half of the table, rising as high as second place in September 2003 while never dropping below sixth after the first round of fixtures. Shrewsbury's defensive record was the second best in the Football Conference with forty-two goals conceded, bettered only by the league winners, Chester City (thirty-four). Howler, Ridler and Tinson recorded the highest number of appearances during the season, each appearing in forty-six of Shrewsbury's fifty-one games. Rodgers was Shrewsbury's top scorer in the league and in all competitions, with thirteen league goals and fifteen in total. Three other players, Cramb, Darby and Lowe, reached double figures.

Prior to the club's Football League return, Shrewsbury released Fitzpatrick, Packer, Parker and Thompson. Quinn was also released as a player but remained as the club's manager into the 2004–05 season. New players to join were defender Dave Walton from Derby County and forward John Grant from Telford United. Dunbavin transferred back to Northwich Victoria for free.

== Match details ==
League positions are sourced by Statto, attendance numbers are sourced to Soccerbase; while the remaining information is referenced individually. Shrewsbury's score is listed first in the score columns.

=== Football Conference ===
Football Conference match details
Date	Position	Opponents	Venue	Result	Score	Scorers	Att.	Ref
9 August 2003	7th	Margate	H	D	1–1	Watts 17'	4,015	
12 August 2003	5th	Burton Albion	A	W	1–0	Rodgers 73'	3,203	
16 August 2003	3rd	Accrington Stanley	A	W	1–0	Cramb 81'	3,143	
23 August 2003	3rd	Farnborough Town	H	W	3–0	Cramb 34', Jagielka 54', Lowe 85'	3,403	
26 August 2003	4th	Chester City	A	L	1–2	Tolley 53'	4,665	
30 August 2003	4th	Dagenham & Redbridge	H	W	2–1	Tolley 34', Cramb 41'	3,468	
7 September 2003	2nd	Tamworth	H	W	3–1	Rodgers (3) 64', 90', 90'	3,882	
13 September 2003	3rd	Aldershot Town	A	D	1–1	Cramb 24'	3,329	
20 September 2003	3rd	Woking	A	D	3–3	Rodgers (3) 12', 48' pen., 90'	2,539	
23 September 2003	3rd	Halifax Town	H	W	2–0	Cramb 80', Lowe 88'	3,807	
27 September 2003	6th	Barnet	H	L	0–1		4,063	
4 October 2003	5th	Scarborough	A	D	1–1	Quinn 43'	1,201	
18 October 2003	6th	Morecambe	H	W	2–0	Rodgers 11', Quinn 75'	3,404	
1 November 2003	6th	Stevenage	A	L	0–2		2,172	
11 November 2003	6th	Forest Green Rovers	H	W	2–0	Tolley 47', Quinn 51'	3,263	
15 November 2003	6th	Gravesend & Northfleet	A	W	3–0	Lowe (2) 17', 64', Cramb 90'	1,397	
18 November 2003	6th	Leigh RMI	A	D	2–2	Cramb 46', Street 90'	1,219	
22 November 2003	5th	Hereford United	H	W	4–1	O'Connor 13', Cramb 37', Street 55', Darby 81'	6,585	
25 November 2003	6th	Exeter City	A	L	2–3	Rodgers 65', Cramb 90'	3,470	
29 November 2003	6th	Tamworth	A	D	1–1	Cramb 14' pen.	1,761	
9 December 2003	6th	Telford United	H	D	0–0		6,738	
14 December 2003	4th	Margate	A	W	2–0	Lowe 83', Banim 90'	635	
26 December 2003	5th	Northwich Victoria	H	W	3–1	Cramb 39', Lowe 63', Tinson 71'	5,059	
1 January 2004	4th	Northwich Victoria	A	W	2–0	Ridler 45', Cramb 58'	3,268	
3 January 2004	5th	Dagenham & Redbridge	A	L	0–5		1,571	
17 January 2004	5th	Accrington Stanley	H	D	0–0		3,777	
24 January 2004	5th	Halifax Town	A	D	0–0		1,830	
21 February 2004	5th	Scarborough	H	W	4–1	Darby (2) 54', 89', Sedgemore 61', O'Connor 73'	3,333	
24 February 2004	5th	Burton Albion	H	W	1–0	Rodgers 17'	3,115	
2 March 2004	5th	Woking	H	W	1–0	Rodgers 72'	3,029	
8 March 2004	3rd	Leigh RMI	H	W	3–1	Darby 11', Lowe 70', Banim 90'	3,307	
13 March 2004	3rd	Forest Green Rovers	A	D	1–1	Rogers 68' o.g.	1,484	
23 March 2004	5th	Aldershot Town	H	L	1–2	Darby 79'	3,371	
27 March 2004	5th	Hereford United	A	L	1–2	Lawrence 4'	5,850	
30 March 2004	5th	Barnet	A	W	1–0	Darby 37'	1,966	
3 April 2004	5th	Exeter City	H	D	2–2	Lawrence 49', Darby 71'	4,185	
6 April 2004	5th	Telford United	A	L	0–1		4,337	
10 April 2004	4th	Farnborough Town	A	W	3–1	Darby (2) 47', 51', Rodgers 76'	1,041	
13 April 2004	3rd	Chester City	H	D	0–0		5,827	
17 April 2004	3rd	Stevenage	H	W	3–1	Ridler 66', Lowe 69', Darby 90'	3,650	
20 April 2004	3rd	Gravesend & Northfleet	H	D	1–1	Rodgers 42'	2,869	
24 April 2004	3rd	Morecambe	A	D	3–3	Lowe 7', Sedgemore 23' pen., Quinn 68'	2,876	

=== FA Cup ===
FA Cup match details
Date	Round	Opponents	Venue	Result	Score	Scorers	Att.	Ref
25 October 2003	QR4	Morecambe	A	W	4–2	Aiston 46', Quinn 52', Lowe (2) 77', 80'	1,951	
8 November 2003	R1	Scunthorpe United	A	L	1–2	Quinn 87'	3,232	

=== Football League Trophy ===
Football League Trophy match details
Date	Round	Opponents	Venue	Result	Score	Scorers	Att.	Ref
14 October 2003	R1	Scunthorpe United	A	L	1–2	Lowe 18'	1,265	

=== FA Trophy ===
FA Trophy match details
Date	Round	Opponents	Venue	Result	Score	Scorers	Att.	Ref
10 January 2004	R3	Morecambe	H	W	2–0	Aiston 19', Cramb 58' pen.	2,413	
31 January 2004	R4	Hucknall Town	H	W	2–1	Street 15', Moss 43'	2,501	
14 February 2004	R5	Altrincham	A	W	1–0	Lowe 84'	1,758	
28 February 2004	QF	Telford United	H	D	1–1	Cramb 64'	6,050	
16 March 2004	QF (replay)	Telford United	A	L	1–2	Darby 64'	4,447	

=== Football Conference play-offs ===
Football Conference play-offs match details
Date	Round	Opponents	Venue	Result	Score	Scorers	Att.	Ref
29 April 2004	SF (Leg 1)	Barnet	A	L	1–2	Rodgers 43' pen.	4,171	
3 May 2004	SF (Leg 2)	Barnet	H	W	1–0^{[a]}	Rodgers 44' pen.	7,012	
16 May 2004	Final	Aldershot Town	N	D	1–1^{[b]}	Darby 43'	19,216	

- a. Aggregate score was 2–2; Shrewsbury Town won 5–3 in a penalty shoot-out
- b. Score remained 1–1 after extra time; Shrewsbury Town won 3–0 in a penalty shoot-out

== See also ==
- List of Shrewsbury Town F.C. seasons
