= 2004 Football Conference play-off final =

- Event: 2003–04 Football Conference
Aldershot Town	Shrewsbury Town
1	1
- Shrewsbury Town won 3–0 on penalties
- Date: 16 May 2004
- Venue: Britannia Stadium, Stoke-on-Trent
- Referee: Keith Stroud (Hampshire)
- Attendance: 19,216

The 2004 Football Conference play-off final took place on 16 May 2004 and was contested between Aldershot Town and Shrewsbury Town. It was held at the Britannia Stadium, Stoke-on-Trent. A crowd of 19,216 attended the game (a conference play-off final record at the time), with just over 12,000 travelling from Shropshire.

== Match ==
=== Summary ===
Aldershot had the first real chance of the game when Roscoe Dsane got on the end of a ball over the top of the defence and held off Shrews captain Darren Tinson, only to drag his shot wide. Jon Challinor then had a chance but failed to connect properly with Aaron McLean's cutback. At the other end it took a crucial intervention from Dominic Sterling to deny Jamie Tolley after a good surging run from the midfielder.

Aldershot took the lead in the 36th minute when Shots captain Ray Warburton headed on a free kick and McLean powered the ball into the net. However Shrewsbury were level just minutes later, with Duane Darby smashing in an almost identical goal. In the second half the Shropshire side should have taken the lead when Luke Rodgers crossed for Ryan Lowe, who blazed over from inside the area.

With the scores level at 1–1, silver goal extra time was required, and Lee Charles had a couple of chances to win it for the Shots. Ultimately the match needed a penalty shoot-out to be settled. After Rodgers had missed Shrewsbury's first kick, goalkeeper Scott Howie was the hero, saving all three of Aldershot's penalties while teammates Tolley, Jake Sedgemore and finally Trevor Challis scored theirs to send Shrewsbury back into the Football League.

=== Details ===
16 May 2004
13:00 BST

Aldershot Town	1–1 (a.e.t.)	Shrewsbury Town
McLean 35'	Report	Darby 43'
Penalties
Sills (penalty missed); Giles (penalty missed); Gosling (penalty missed)	0–3	(penalty missed) Rodgers; (penalty scored) Tolley; (penalty scored) Sedgemore; (penalty scored) Challis

Britannia Stadium, Stoke-on-Trent
Attendance: 19,216
Referee: Keith Stroud (Hampshire)

GK	1	Nikki Bull
DF	16	Simon Downer		(substituted off) 66'
DF	6	Dominic Sterling	Booked
DF	5	Ray Warburton (c)
DF	37	Will Antwi
MF	8	Chris Giles
MF	18	Jamie Gosling
MF	19	Jon Challinor
MF	26	Adam Miller
FW	10	Roscoe Dsane		(substituted off) 86'
FW	11	Aaron McLean		(substituted off) 60'
Substitutes:
GK	22	Richard Barnard
DF	3	Jason Chewins
DF	2	Dean Hooper		(substituted in) 66'
FW	23	Lee Charles		(substituted in) 86'
FW	9	Tim Sills		(substituted in) 60'
Manager:
Terry Brown

GK	25	Scott Howie
DF	15	Trevor Challis
DF	5	Darren Tinson (c)		(substituted off) 91'
DF	6	David Ridler (yellow card)
MF	8	Jake Sedgemore
MF	11	Sam Aiston
MF	12	Martin O'Connor	Booked	(substituted off) 84'
MF	4	Jamie Tolley
FW	17	Ryan Lowe	Booked
FW	18	Duane Darby		(substituted off) 93'
FW	9	Luke Rodgers
Substitutes:
GK	30	Joe Hart
DF	27	Lee Lawrence		(substituted in) 91'
MF	21	David Edwards
MF	29	Kevin Street		(substituted in) 84'
FW	10	Colin Cramb		(substituted in) 93'
Manager:
Jimmy Quinn

Match rules:

- 90 minutes.
- 30 minutes of silver-goal extra time if necessary.
- Penalty shoot-out if scores still level.
- Five named substitutes
- Maximum of three substitutions.
