= List of Shrewsbury Town F.C. seasons =

Shrewsbury Town Football Club, a professional association football club based in Shrewsbury, Shropshire, England, was founded in 1886. They first played league football in the inaugural Shropshire & District League for the 1890–91 season; they finished the season as runners-up and also won the Welsh Cup for the first time in their fourth attempt. After five seasons in the Shropshire & District League, they were admitted to the Birmingham & District League in 1895; they won their first league championship in that league in 1923. In 1937 they moved to the Midland Football League where they won the league three times out of the seven seasons they participated in. In 1950 they joined The Football League competing in its Third Division North for one season before being transferred to the South equivalent for the rest of their time in the third division. Shrewsbury played in the Third Division South until 1958–59, when they were placed in the Fourth Division on League reorganisation. They gained their first promotion in the same season after finishing fourth. They remained in The Football League, albeit in different divisions, until they were relegated to the Football Conference in 2003. It was in the Conference where Shrewsbury achieved their first play-off success, when they beat Aldershot Town in a penalty shoot-out after a 1–1 draw after extra time at the Britannia Stadium to win promotion back into the newly renamed Football League Two. Since then Shrewsbury have remained in the Football League.

Shrewsbury's furthest FA Cup run saw them reach the sixth round twice, first in 1978–79 and then in 1981–82. The furthest they have reached in the EFL Cup is the semi-finals in the 1960–61 edition which was the inaugural staging of the competition. Shrewsbury first participated in the EFL Trophy in 1989; they were the runners-up in the 1996 and 2018 finals. Shrewsbury also took part in 41 editions of the Welsh Cup between 1886 and 1989 reaching the final nine times and winning the cup six times. They took part in three FA Amateur Cups reaching the quarter-finals in 1893–94, the second round in 1894–95 and the semi-finals in 1895–96. After their exit from the Football League in 2003 Shrewsbury were eligible to take part in the 2003–04 FA Trophy and were eliminated in the quarter-finals.

== Key ==
Key to divisions

- Shropshire – Shropshire & District League
- Birmingham – Birmingham & District League
- Midland – Midland Football League
- Division 2 – Football League Second Division
- Division 3 – Football League Third Division
- Division 3N – Football League Third Division North
- Division 3S – Football League Third Division South
- Division 4 – Football League Fourth Division
- Conference – Football Conference
- League 1 – Football League One/EFL League One
- League 2 – Football League Two/EFL League Two

Key to rounds

- EPR – Extra preliminary round
- PR – Preliminary round
- QR1 – First qualifying round, etc.
- IntR – Intermediate round
- Group – Group stage
- R1 – First round, etc.
- QF – Quarter-finals
- SF – Semi-finals
- RU(N) – Runner-up of the northern section
- RU – Runner-up
- W – Winner

Key to positions and symbols

- 1st – Champions
- 2nd – Runners-up
- ↑ – Promoted
- ↓ – Relegated
- † – Top or joint-top league scorer in Shrewsbury's division
- N/A – Competition not eligible to enter
- — – Shrewsbury did not enter the competition

== Seasons ==
List of seasons, including league division and statistics, cup results and top scorer
Season	League record									FA Cup	EFL Cup	EFL (Note: The EFL Trophy was called the Football League Group Cup from 1981 to 1982, the Associate Members' Cup from 1983 to 1992 and the Football League Trophy from 1992 to 2016.) Trophy	Welsh Cup	Other		Top scorer (Note: Includes goals scored in league games (including play-offs), FA Cup, EFL Cup and Associate Members' Cup/EFL Trophy.)	
Season	Division	P	W	D	L	F	A	Pts	Pos	FA Cup	EFL Cup	EFL Trophy	Welsh Cup	Competition	Result	Name	Goals
1886–87	The club did not start playing league football until 1890.									—	N/A (Note: The EFL Cup competition started in the 1960–61 season.)	N/A (Note: The EFL Trophy competition started in the 1983–84 season (as the Associate Members' Cup).)	R2	—	—	N/A	
1887–88	The club did not start playing league football until 1890.									R2	N/A	N/A	R1	—	—	Pearson (Note: This is the top scorer's surname, their first name is unknown or to be confirmed.)	3
1888–89	The club did not start playing league football until 1890.									QR2	N/A	N/A	—	—	—		
1889–90	The club did not start playing league football until 1890.									QR2	N/A	N/A	R3	—	—	Four players (Note: The joint-scorers were Davies, Murphy, Pearson and Rowlands)	1
1890–91	Shropshire	14	9	1	4	42	21	19	2nd	QR1	N/A	N/A	W	—	—		
1891–92	Shropshire	16	6	4	6	48	48	16	6th	—	N/A	N/A	SF	—	—		
1892–93	Shropshire	16	7	6	3	45	37	20	4th	—	N/A	N/A	—	—	—		
1893–94	Shropshire	18	11	2	5	61	39	24	3rd	—	N/A	N/A	R4	FA Amateur Cup	QF		
1894–95	Shropshire	17 (Note: Shrewsbury did not play their scheduled final league match away at St George's.)	8	4	5	42	28	20	3rd	—	N/A	N/A	R2	FA Amateur Cup	R2		
1895–96	Birmingham	30	8	5	17	46	98	21	12th	—	N/A	N/A	—	FA Amateur Cup	SF		
1896–97	Birmingham	30	11	3	16	58	67	25	12th	—	N/A	N/A	—	—	—		
1897–98	Birmingham	30	10	3	17	44	65	23	11th	—	N/A	N/A	—	—	—	White	10
1898–99	Birmingham	34	10	6	18	65	90	26	13th	QR1	N/A	N/A	—	—	—		
1899–1900	Birmingham	30	9	3	18	40	73	21	14th	QR2	N/A	N/A	—	—	—		
1900–01	Birmingham	34	7	3	24	29	96	17	18th	QR3	N/A	N/A	—	—	—	Steadman	9
1901–02	Birmingham	34	14	4	16	57	80	32	11th	QR1	N/A	N/A	—	—	—	Wharton	12
1902–03	Birmingham	34	13	11	10	60	44	37	6th	QR1	N/A	N/A	—	—	—	Wharton	15
1903–04	Birmingham	34	14	6	14	51	48	34	10th	IntR	N/A	N/A	—	—	—	Roberts	11
1904–05	Birmingham	34	10	4	20	42	63	24	16th	—	N/A	N/A	—	—	—	Davies	12
1905–06	Birmingham	34	15	3	16	57	84	33	10th	—	N/A	N/A	R3	—	—		
1906–07	Birmingham	34	7	5	22	61	106	19	18th	—	N/A	N/A	—	—	—	Billy Scarratt	14
1907–08	Birmingham	34	16	7	11	67	65	39	5th	—	N/A	N/A	—	—	—		
1908–09	Birmingham	34	11	13	10	51	48	35	6th	QR1	N/A	N/A	—	—	—	J. Jones	16
1909–10	Birmingham	34	13	5	16	48	63	31	11th	R1	N/A	N/A	—	—	—	F.W. Jones; Walter Tarplin	9
1910–11	Birmingham	34	14	4	16	61	74	32	11th	QR5	N/A	N/A	—	—	—		
1911–12	Birmingham	34	9	3	22	44	76	21	17th	QR1	N/A	N/A	—	—	—		
1912–13	Birmingham	34	14	5	15	59	50	33	10th	QR5	N/A	N/A	—	—	—		
1913–14	Birmingham	34	21	5	8	76	48	47	2nd	QR4	N/A	N/A	—	—	—		
1914–15	Birmingham	34	12	6	16	62	69	30	12th	QR6	N/A	N/A	—	—	—		
1915–19	No competitive football was played between 1915 and 1919 due to the First World War.																
1919–20	Birmingham	34	14	2	18	59	95	30	14th	QR4	N/A	N/A	—	—	—		
1920–21	Birmingham	34	17	4	13	69	55	38	6th	QR2	N/A	N/A	—	—	—		
1921–22	Birmingham	34	14	12	8	71	54	40	5th	QR4	N/A	N/A	R3	—	—		
1922–23	Birmingham	34	23	4	7	82	41	50	1st	QR3	N/A	N/A	R5	—	—		
1923–24	Birmingham	34	21	3	10	78	43	45	2nd	QR4	N/A	N/A	R3	—	—		
1924–25	Birmingham	34	16	5	13	75	46	37	9th	QR1	N/A	N/A	—	—	—		
1925–26	Birmingham	34	17	4	13	76	59	38	5th	QR3	N/A	N/A	—	—	—		
1926–27	Birmingham	34	13	4	17	73	79	30	13th	QR1	N/A	N/A	R1	—	—		
1927–28	Birmingham	34	20	4	10	119	71	44	4th	QR2	N/A	N/A	—	—	—		
1928–29	Birmingham	34	18	3	12	97	69	41	5th	PR	N/A	N/A	R5	—	—		
1929–30	Birmingham	34	19	4	11	78	55	42	4th	QR1	N/A	N/A	R4	—	—		
1930–31	Birmingham	34	14	5	15	76	79	33	9th	EPR	N/A	N/A	RU	—	—		
1931–32	Birmingham	34	13	7	14	64	82	33	10th	QR1	N/A	N/A	R6	—	—	Billy Rotton; George Sambrook	16
1932–33	Birmingham	34	15	6	13	70	62	36	8th	QR3	N/A	N/A	R6	—	—	Joe Taylor	34
1933–34	Birmingham	38	18	6	14	89	77	42	10th	QR4	N/A	N/A	—	—	—	Joe Taylor	49
1934–35	Birmingham	36	21	6	9	81	43	48	4th	QR3	N/A	N/A	SF	—	—	Jack Roscamp	19
1935–36	Birmingham	38	26	1	11	124	70	53	3rd	QR2	N/A	N/A	SF	—	—	Bill Hewitson	65
1936–37	Birmingham	36	23	4	9	133	64	50	2nd	QR1	N/A	N/A	R6	—	—	Horace Baker; Danny Williams	26
1937–38	Midland	42	25	9	8	111	50	59	1st	QR2	N/A	N/A	W	—	—	Danny Williams	47
1938–39	Midland	42	25	5	12	125	65	55	3rd	QR4	N/A	N/A	R5	—	—	Danny Williams	33
1939–40	Midland	3	1	0	2	7	9	2	14th (Note: When the Second World War began, the 1939–40 Midland Football League season was abandoned with three matches played.)	—	N/A	N/A	R4	—	—	Arthur; Danny Williams	2
1939–45	No competitive football was played between 1939 and 1945 due to the Second World War.																
1945–46	Midland	36	26	6	4	133	43	58	1st	R2	N/A	N/A	—	—	—	Billy Richardson	55
1946–47	Midland	42	25	4	13	117	77	54	6th	QR4	N/A	N/A	R6	—	—	Jackie Butler	35
1947–48	Midland	42	28	6	8	98	51	62	1st	R2	N/A	N/A	RU	—	—	Jack Davie	29
1948–49	Midland	42	19	7	16	82	70	45	8th	QR4	N/A	N/A	R5	—	—	Jackie Butler	17
1949–50	Midland	46	19	11	16	96	86	49	10th	QR4	N/A	N/A	—	—	—	Jackie Butler	27
1950–51	Division 3N	46	15	7	24	43	74	37	20th	PR	N/A	N/A	—	—	—	Robert Brown	14
1951–52	Division 3S	46	13	10	23	62	86	36	20th	R1	N/A	N/A	—	—	—	Robert Brown	15
1952–53	Division 3S	46	12	12	22	68	91	36	23rd	R4	N/A	N/A	—	—	—	Robert Brown; Arnold Jackson	16
1953–54	Division 3S	46	14	12	20	65	76	40	21st	R1	N/A	N/A	—	—	—	John Hudson; Alec McCue	15
1954–55	Division 3S	46	16	10	20	70	78	42	16th	R1	N/A	N/A	—	—	—	Ray Weigh	18
1955–56	Division 3S	46	17	12	17	69	66	46	13th	R2	N/A	N/A	—	—	—	William O'Donnell	20
1956–57	Division 3S	46	15	18	13	72	79	48	9th	R1	N/A	N/A	—	—	—	Colin Whitaker	19
1957–58	Division 3S	46	15	10	21	49	71	40	17th	R1	N/A	N/A	—	—	—	Ken Smith	15
1958–59	Division 4 ↑	46	24	10	12	101	63	58	4th	R2	N/A	N/A	—	—	—	Arthur Rowley	39 †
1959–60	Division 3	46	18	16	12	97	75	52	3rd	R1	N/A	N/A	—	—	—	Arthur Rowley	33
1960–61	Division 3	46	15	16	15	83	75	46	10th	R3	SF	N/A	—	—	—	Arthur Rowley	32
1961–62	Division 3	46	13	12	21	73	84	38	19th	R4	R2	N/A	—	—	—	Arthur Rowley	29
1962–63	Division 3	46	16	12	18	83	81	44	15th	R3	R2	N/A	—	—	—	Arthur Rowley	27
1963–64	Division 3	46	18	11	17	73	80	47	11th	R1	R1	N/A	—	—	—	Harry Middleton	22
1964–65	Division 3	46	15	12	19	76	84	42	16th	R5	R2	N/A	—	—	—	Bobby Ross	21
1965–66	Division 3	46	19	11	16	73	64	49	10th	R5	R3	N/A	—	—	—	Frank Clarke	27
1966–67	Division 3	46	20	12	14	77	62	52	6th	R3	R2	N/A	—	—	—	John Manning	20
1967–68	Division 3	46	20	15	11	61	49	55	3rd	R3	R1	N/A	—	—	—	Frank Clarke	15
1968–69	Division 3	46	16	11	19	51	67	43	17th	R1	R1	N/A	—	—	—	Alf Wood	13
1969–70	Division 3	46	13	18	15	62	63	44	15th	R2	R2	N/A	—	—	—	Terry Harkin	16
1970–71	Division 3	46	16	13	17	58	62	45	13th	R2	R1	N/A	—	—	—	George Andrews	20
1971–72	Division 3	46	17	10	19	73	65	44	12th	R3	R2	N/A	—	—	—	Alf Wood	40
1972–73	Division 3	46	15	14	17	46	54	44	15th	R2	R1	N/A	—	—	—	Terry Hughes	12
1973–74	Division 3 ↓	46	10	11	25	41	62	31	22nd	R1	R1	N/A	SF	—	—	Alan Durban	9
1974–75	Division 4 ↑	46	26	10	10	80	43	62	2nd	R1	R1	N/A	SF	—	—	Ray Hayward	22
1975–76	Division 3	46	19	10	17	61	59	48	9th	R3	R2	N/A	SF	—	—	Mike Kearney	14
1976–77	Division 3	46	18	11	17	65	59	47	10th	R3	R1	N/A	W	—	—	Chic Bates	15
1977–78	Division 3	46	16	15	15	63	57	47	11th	R3	R1	N/A	SF	—	—	Sammy Irvine	11
1978–79	Division 3 ↑	46	21	19	6	61	41	61	1st	R6	R1	N/A	W	—	—	Paul Maguire	18
1979–80	Division 2	42	18	5	19	60	53	41	13th	R3	R2	N/A	RU	—	—	Steve Biggins	13
1980–81	Division 2	42	11	17	14	46	47	39	14th	R4	R2	N/A	R5	Anglo-Scottish Cup	Group	Steve Biggins	10
1981–82	Division 2	42	11	13	18	37	57	46	18th	R6	R2	SF	R5	—	—	Ian Atkins	19
1982–83	Division 2	42	15	14	13	48	48	59	9th	R4	R2	R1	R4	—	—	Alan Brown	14
1983–84	Division 2	42	17	10	15	49	53	61	8th	R5	R3	—	W	—	—	Steve Cross	9
1984–85	Division 2	42	18	11	13	66	53	65	8th	R3	R2	—	W	—	—	Gary Stevens	20
1985–86	Division 2	42	13	10	19	50	64	49	19th	R3	R3	—	R3	Full Members' Cup	R1	Colin Robinson	12
1986–87	Division 2	42	15	6	21	41	53	51	18th	R3	R5	—	R4	Full Members' Cup	R1	Colin Robinson	13
1987–88	Division 2	44	11	16	17	42	54	49	18th	R4	R2	—	—	Full Members' Cup	R1	Mickey Brown	6
1988–89	Division 2 ↓	46	8	18	20	40	67	42	22nd	R3	R1	—	R3	Full Members' Cup	R1	Carl Griffiths	6
1989–90	Division 3	46	16	15	15	59	54	63	11th	R1	R2	R1	—	—	—	John McGinlay	26
1990–91	Division 3	46	14	10	22	61	68	52	18th	R5	R2	PR	—	—	—	Gary Shaw	12
1991–92	Division 3 ↓	46	12	11	23	53	68	47	22nd	R1	R2	R1	—	—	—	Neil Lyne; Kevin Summerfield	11
1992–93	Division 3 (Note: The Fourth Division was renamed Division Three after the teams in the First Division broke away from The Football League to form the FA Premier League.)	42	17	11	14	57	52	62	9th	R2	R1	R1	—	—	—	Carl Griffiths	31 †
1993–94	Division 3 ↑	42	22	13	7	63	39	79	1st	R2	R3	R1	—	—	—	Dean Spink	20
1994–95	Division 2	46	13	14	19	54	62	53	18th	R1	R1	SF	—	—	—	Dean Spink	14
1995–96	Division 2	46	13	14	19	58	70	53	18th	R4	R2	RU	N/A (Note: Since 1995 English football clubs have not been invited to play in the Welsh Cup.)	—	—	Ian Stevens	20
1996–97	Division 2 ↓	46	11	13	22	49	74	46	22nd	R1	R1	SF	N/A	—	—	Ian Stevens	19
1997–98	Division 3	46	16	13	17	61	62	61	13th	R1	R1	R1	N/A	—	—	Lee Steele	16
1998–99	Division 3	46	14	14	18	53	63	56	15th	R1	R1	R1	N/A	—	—	Lee Steele	13
1999–2000	Division 3	46	9	13	24	40	67	40	22nd	R2	R1	R1	N/A	—	—	Lee Steele	11
2000–01	Division 3	46	15	10	21	49	65	55	15th	R1	R1	R2	N/A	—	—	Nigel Jemson	15
2001–02	Division 3	46	20	10	16	64	53	70	9th	R1	R1	R1	N/A	—	—	Luke Rodgers	21
2002–03	Division 3 ↓	46	9	14	23	62	92	41	24th	R4	R1	RU(N)	N/A	—	—	Luke Rodgers	20
2003–04	Conference ↑	42	20	14	8	67	42	74	3rd (Note: Promoted to Football League Two via the play-offs, beating Barnet 5–3 in a penalty shoot-out in the semi-final after the aggregate score was 2–2, and 3–0 in a penalty shoot-out in the 2004 Football Conference play-off final after the match had finished 1–1 after extra time.)	R1	N/A (Note: As members of the Football Conference, Shrewsbury were not eligible to enter the Football League Cup.)	R1	N/A	FA Trophy	QF	Luke Rodgers	15
2004–05	League 2	46	11	16	19	48	53	49	21st	R1	R1	R2	N/A	—	—	Luke Rodgers	8
2005–06	League 2	46	16	13	17	55	55	61	10th	R2	R2	R1	N/A	—	—	Colin McMenamin	11
2006–07	League 2	46	18	17	11	68	46	71	7th (Note: Beat Milton Keynes Dons 2–1 on aggregate in the semi-final before losing 3–1 to Bristol Rovers in the 2007 Football League Two play-off final.)	R1	R1	SF	N/A	—	—	Michael Symes	13
2007–08	League 2	46	12	14	20	56	65	50	18th	R1	R2	R1	N/A	—	—	David Hibbert	12
2008–09	League 2	46	17	18	11	61	44	69	7th (Note: Beat Bury 4–3 in a penalty shoot-out in the semi-final after the aggregate score was 1–1, before losing 1–0 to Gillingham in the 2009 Football League Two play-off final.)	R1	R1	SF	N/A	—	—	Grant Holt	28 †
2009–10	League 2	46	17	12	17	55	54	63	12th	R1	R1	R2	N/A	—	—	David Hibbert	15
2010–11	League 2	46	22	13	11	72	49	79	4th (Note: Lost in the play-off semi-final to Torquay United 2–0 on aggregate.)	R1	R2	R2	N/A	—	—	Mark Wright	14
2011–12	League 2 ↑	46	26	10	10	66	41	88	2nd	R3	R3	R1	N/A	—	—	James Collins	16
2012–13	League 1	46	13	16	17	54	60	55	16th	R1	R1	R2	N/A	—	—	Marvin Morgan	7
2013–14	League 1 ↓	46	9	15	22	44	65	42	23rd	R1	R1	R1	N/A	—	—	Jon Taylor	9
2014–15	League 2 ↑	46	27	8	11	67	31	89	2nd	R2	R4	R1	N/A	—	—	James Collins	17
2015–16	League 1	46	13	11	22	58	79	50	20th	R5	R2	R2	N/A	—	—	Sullay Kaikai	12
2016–17	League 1	46	13	12	21	46	63	51	18th	R2	R2	Group	N/A	—	—	Louis Dodds	10
2017–18	League 1	46	25	12	9	60	39	87	3rd (Note: Beat Charlton Athletic 2–0 on aggregate in the semi-final before losing 2–1 to Rotherham United in the 2018 EFL League One play-off final.)	R3	R1	RU	N/A	—	—	Stefan Payne	14
2018–19	League 1	46	12	16	18	51	59	52	18th	R4	R1	R3	N/A	—	—	Fejiri Okenabirhie	16
2019–20	League 1	34	10	11	13	31	42	41	15th (Note: The 2019–20 EFL League One was curtailed due to the COVID-19 pandemic, with league positions, promotions and relegations decided on a points-per-game basis.)	R4	R1	R2	N/A	—	—	Jason Cummings	7
2020–21	League 1	46	13	15	18	50	57	54	17th	R3	R1	R2	N/A	—	—	Shaun Whalley	9
2021–22	League 1	46	12	14	20	47	51	50	18th	R3	R2	Group	N/A	—	—	Daniel Udoh	16
2022–23	League 1	46	17	8	21	52	61	59	12th	R3	R2	Group	N/A	—	—	Luke Leahy	12
2023–24	League 1	46	13	9	24	35	67	48	19th	R3	R1	Group	N/A	—	—	Daniel Udoh	12
2024–25	League 1 ↓	46	8	9	29	41	79	33	24th	R1	R2	Group	N/A	—	—	John Marquis	12
2025–26	League 2	46	13	10	23	42	69	49	19th	R3	R1	Group	N/A	—	—	John Marquis	6
