= 2004–05 Shrewsbury Town F.C. season =

Shrewsbury Town F.C.
2004–05 season
- Chairman: Roland Wycherley
- Manager: Jimmy Quinn (until 22 October 2004); Chic Bates (until 15 November 2004); Gary Peters (from 15 November 2004)
- Ground: Gay Meadow
- Football League Two: 21st
- FA Cup: First round
- League Cup: First round
- League Trophy: Second round
- Biggest win: 5–0
- Biggest defeat: 1–4 / 0–3

The 2004–05 season saw Shrewsbury Town's compete in League Two where they finished in 21st position with 49 points.

== Final league table ==
Pos	Team	Pld	W	D	L	GF	GA	GD	Pts	Promotion or relegation
19	Notts County	46	13	13	20	46	62	−16	52	
20	Chester City	46	12	16	18	43	69	−26	52	
21	Shrewsbury Town	46	11	16	19	48	53	−5	49	
22	Rushden & Diamonds	46	10	14	22	42	63	−21	44	
23	Kidderminster Harriers (R)	46	10	8	28	39	85	−46	38	Relegation to Conference National

Updated to match(es) played on 15 September 2009. Source: 2004–05 League Two
Rules for classification: 1) points; 2) goal difference; 3) number of goals scored.
(R) Relegated

== Results ==
=== Legend ===
Win	Draw	Loss

=== Football League Two ===
Match	Date	Opponent	Venue	Result	Attendance	Scorers
1	7 August 2004	Lincoln City	H	0–1	4,843	
2	10 August 2004	Macclesfield Town	A	1–2	2,641	Smith 66'
3	14 August 2004	Cambridge United	A	0–1	3,135	
4	21 August 2004	Northampton Town	H	2–0	3,980	Grant 50', Smith 78'
5	28 August 2004	Oxford United	A	0–2	4,430	
6	31 August 2004	Cheltenham Town	H	2–0	3,862	Lowe 35', Rodgers 88'
7	4 September 2004	Bristol Rovers	A	0–0	8,381	
8	11 September 2004	Bury	H	2–2	3,801	Moss 70', Challinor 76' (o.g.)
9	18 September 2004	Boston United	A	2–2	2,593	Logan 25', Smith 34'
10	25 September 2004	Yeovil Town	H	1–2	4,196	Rodgers 40'
11	2 October 2004	Wycombe Wanderers	A	1–1	4,634	Moss 37'
12	8 October 2004	Rushden & Diamonds	H	0–1	3,882	
13	16 October 2004	Leyton Orient	A	1–4	3,718	Fox 90'
14	19 October 2004	Grimsby Town	H	1–1	2,956	Sedgemore 77'
15	23 October 2004	Southend United	H	1–1	3,719	Street 25'
16	30 October 2004	Kidderminster Harriers	A	1–0	3,830	Lowe 82'
17	6 November 2004	Notts County	A	0–3	5,754	
18	20 November 2004	Swansea City	H	2–0	5,055	Sedgemore 21', Walton 81'
19	27 November 2004	Scunthorpe United	A	1–3	4,418	Tolley 70'
20	7 December 2004	Rochdale	H	0–2	3,677	
21	11 December 2004	Chester City	A	1–1	3,219	Langmead 62'
22	18 December 2004	Mansfield Town	H	0–2	3,496	
23	28 December 2004	Darlington	H	4–0	3,915	Aiston 34', Tolley (2) 38', 44', Edwards 90'
24	1 January 2005	Bristol Rovers	H	2–0	5,034	Edwards 34', Grant 71'
25	3 January 2005	Yeovil Town	A	2–4	7,320	Sedgemore 64', Edwards 74'
26	8 January 2005	Rushden & Diamonds	A	0–0	2,829	
27	15 January 2005	Boston United	H	0–0	3,789	
28	22 January 2005	Darlington	A	0–3	3,934	
29	29 January 2005	Wycombe Wanderers	H	0–1	3,884	
30	5 February 2005	Leyton Orient	H	4–1	3,496	Walton 43', Darby 53', Moss (2) 68', 75'
31	8 February 2005	Bury	A	0–0	2,223	
32	12 February 2005	Grimsby Town	A	1–0	4,781	Sedgemore 26'
33	19 February 2005	Kidderminster Harriers	A	4–2	5,309	Moss (2) 33', 40', Langmead 45, Rodgers 56'
34	22 February 2005	Southend United	A	0–1	4,219	
35	26 February 2005	Chester City	H	5–0	4,829	Tolley 28', Rodgers 41', Sedgemore 57', Lowe 65', Langmead 78'
36	5 March 2005	Mansfield Town	A	1–1	3,278	Rodgers 75'
37	12 March 2005	Macclesfield Town	A	0–1	4,262	
38	19 March 2005	Lincoln City	A	0–2	4,255	
39	25 March 2005	Cambridge United	H	0–0	5,309	
40	28 March 2005	Northampton Town	A	0–2	6,514	
41	2 April 2005	Oxford United	H	3–0	3,974	Edwards 47', Wanless (o.g.) 57', Rodgers 71'
42	8 April 2005	Cheltenham Town	A	1–1	3,769	Sheron 79'
43	16 April 2005	Rochdale	A	1–1	3,142	Sheron 6'
44	23 April 2005	Notts County	H	1–1	4,202	Edwards 60'
45	30 April 2005	Swansea City	A	0–1	11,469	
46	7 May 2005	Scunthorpe United	H	0–0	6,285	

=== FA Cup ===
Round	Date	Opponent	Venue	Result	Attendance	Scorers
R1	13 November 2004	Histon	A	0–2	1,538	

=== League Cup ===
Round	Date	Opponent	Venue	Result	Attendance	Scorers
R1	24 August 2004	Tranmere Rovers	A	1–2	4,489	Rodgers 67'

=== League Trophy ===
Round	Date	Opponent	Venue	Result	Attendance	Scorers
R1	28 September 2004	Bournemouth	H	3–2	1,278	Rodgers 41', Young (o.g.) 46', Logan 66'
R2	2 November 2004	Southend United	A	1–4	2,599	Tolley 28'

== Squad statistics ==
No.	Pos.	Name	League		FA Cup		League Cup		League Trophy		Total	
No.	Pos.	Name	Apps	Goals	Apps	Goals	Apps	Goals	Apps	Goals	Apps	Goals
1	GK	(England) Scott Howie	40	0	1	0	1	0	2	0	44	0
2	DF	(Wales) Darren Moss	26	6	0	0	1	0	1	0	28	6
2	DF	(England) Andy Wilkinson	9	0	0	0	0	0	0	0	9	0
3	DF	(England) Trevor Challis	38	0	1	0	0	0	1	0	40	0
4	MF	(England) Jamie Tolley	33(3)	4	0	0	0(1)	0	2	1	35(4)	5
5	DF	(Wales) Darren Tinson	42(1)	0	1	0	1	0	1	0	45(1)	0
6	DF	(England) David Ridler	6(3)	0	0	0	1	0	2	0	9(3)	0
7	FW	(England) Mike Sheron	6(1)	2	0	0	0	0	0	0	5(1)	2
8	MF	(England) Jake Sedgemore	25(6)	5	1	0	0	0	2	0	28(6)	5
9	FW	(England) Luke Rodgers	35(1)	6	1	0	1	1	2	1	39(1)	8
10	DF	(England) Neil Ashton	22(2)	0	0	0	0	0	0	0	22(2)	0
10	FW	(Scotland) Colin Cramb	0(2)	0	0	0	0(1)	0	0	0	0(3)	0
11	MF	(England) Sam Aiston	26(9)	1	1	0	1	0	1	0	29(9)	1
12	MF	(England) Martin O'Connor	13(8)	0	1	0	0	0	0	0	14(8)	0
14	MF	(England) Stuart Whitehead	37(3)	0	1	0	0	0	2	0	40(3)	0
15	MF	(England) Ben Smith	10(2)	3	0	0	1	0	1	0	12(2)	3
16	FW	(England) Richard Logan	5	1	0	0	0	0	1	1	6	2
16	DF	(England) Gavin Cowan	5	0	0	0	0	0	0	0	5	0
16	DF	(Northern Ireland) Liam Burns	1(1)	0	0	0	0	0	0	0	1(1)	0
17	FW	(England) Ryan Lowe	19(11)	3	1	0	1	0	0(2)	0	21(13)	3
18	FW	(England) Duane Darby	8(8)	1	0	0	0	0	1	0	9(8)	1
19	MF	(Wales) David Edwards	16(11)	5	1	0	1	0	0(1)	0	18(12)	5
20	FW	(Italy) Marco Adaggio	0(5)	0	0	0	0	0	0	0	0(5)	0
20	FW	(England) John Grant	10(9)	2	1	0	1	0	0(1)	0	12(10)	2
21	MF	(England) Kevin Street	15(6)	1	1	0	0	0	1(1)	0	17(7)	1
22	GK	(England) Joe Hart	6	0	0	0	0	0	0	0	6	0
23	MF	(Wales) Ross Stephens	0(2)	0	0	0	0	0	1	0	1(2)	0
25	DF	(England) Dave Walton	20(2)	1	0(1)	0	1	0	0	0	22(2)	1
26	DF	(England) John McGrath	7(1)	0	0	0	0	0	0	0	7(1)	0
27	MF	(England) David Fox	2(2)	1	0	0	0	0	1	0	3(2)	1
28	DF	(England) Kelvin Langmead	24(4)	3	0	0	0	0	0	0	24(4)	3
29	DF	(Republic of Ireland) Ciarán Lyng	0(4)	0	0	0	0	0	0	0	0(4)	0
