= List of Macclesfield Town F.C. players =

This is a list of notable footballers who have played for Macclesfield Town F.C. Generally, this means players that have played 100 senior matches for the club. Other players who have played an important role for the club can be included, but the reason why they have been included should be added in the 'Notes' column.

For a list of all Macclesfield players, major or minor, with a Wikipedia article, see Category:Macclesfield Town players, and for the current squad see the main Macclesfield Town article.

Players are listed according to the date of their first team debut. Appearances and goals are for first-team competitive matches only; wartime matches are excluded. Substitute appearances included.

== Table ==
Name	Position	Macclesfield career	League apps	League goals	Total apps	Total goals	Notes
Darren Tinson	DF	1997?–2003?	263	5	?	?	
Danny Whitaker	MF	2001?–2006?	171	23	?	?	
Matthew Tipton	FW	2002-2005, 2006-2007, 2009–2010	?	?	218	60	
Danny Swailes	DF	2009-	?	?	112	5	
Shaun Brisley	DF	2007-	?	?	111	6	
Nat Brown	DF	2008-	?	?	129	14	
Paul Morgan	DF	2008-	?	?	114	0	
Emile Sinclair	FW	2009-	?	?	102	17	
