= David Edwards (footballer, born 1986) =

Wales international footballer

Dave Edwards
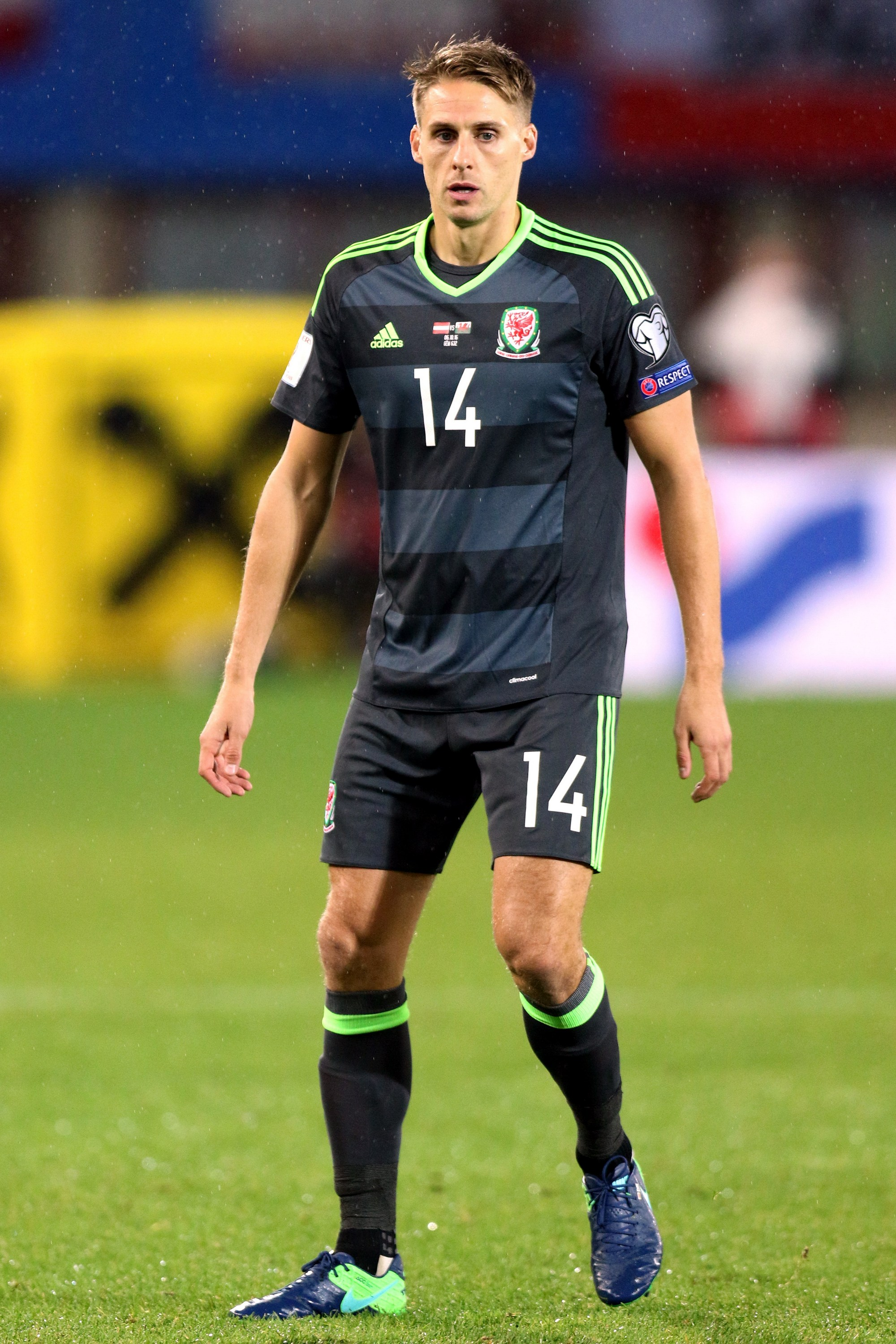
- Edwards playing for Wales in 2016

Personal information
- Full name: David Alexander Edwards
- Date of birth: 3 February 1986 (age 40)
- Place of birth: Pontesbury, England
- Height: 6 ft 0 in (1.83 m)
- Position: Midfielder

Youth career
- 1996–2003: Shrewsbury Town

Senior career*
Years	Team	Apps	(Gls)
2003–2007	Shrewsbury Town	119	(12)
2007–2008	Luton Town	19	(4)
2008–2017	Wolverhampton Wanderers	284	(41)
2017–2019	Reading	32	(3)
2019–2021	Shrewsbury Town	66	(2)
2021–2023	Bala Town	52	(12)
Total		572	(74)

International career
2006–2008	Wales U21	9	(1)
2007–2017	Wales	43	(3)
Medal record
Men's football
Representing Wales
UEFA European Championship
Bronze medal – third place	2016 France
- * Club domestic league appearances and goals as of 16:12, 25 March 2023 (UTC)

David Alexander Edwards (born 3 February 1986) is a former professional football player who played for Wolverhampton Wanderers and Shrewsbury Town. He is currently assistant head coach of Shrewsbury Town

Edwards began his career at hometown club Shrewsbury Town, making his professional debut in 2003. After three full seasons with the team in League Two he moved to Luton Town of League One in July 2007. Due to Luton's financial situation he moved the following January to Wolverhampton Wanderers for a fee believed to be £675,000. Edwards was part of the Wolves teams that won the Championship in 2009 and League One in 2013, and also played three seasons with the club in the Premier League. He totalled 307 games and 44 goals for the club before transferring to Reading in August 2017. In January 2019, he returned to Shrewsbury and after being released went part-time to join Bala Town in the Cymru Premier.

He was capped by the Welsh national team 43 times from 2007 to 2017, scoring three goals. Edwards represented the nation at UEFA Euro 2016, in which Wales reached the semi-finals.

== Club career ==
=== Shrewsbury Town ===
Born in Pontesbury, Shropshire, Edwards started as an apprentice at his hometown club, Shrewsbury Town, and made his professional debut in the final match of 2002–03 season as an 83rd-minute substitute for Jamie Tolley in a 2–1 defeat at home to Scunthorpe United on 3 May 2003, as Shrewsbury were relegated from the Football League.

Shrewsbury secured an instant promotion back to the Football League in 2003–04, though Edwards did not play a large role, making just 16 appearances. Upon the club's return to the Football League, Edwards became a regular first-team player, a role he retained for three successive seasons at Gay Meadow.

Towards the end of the 2006–07 season, Edwards was the subject of transfer speculation, after rejecting an offered extension to his Shrewsbury contract. He was then controversially left out of the play-off final against Bristol Rovers by then-manager Gary Peters, despite playing an important role in their run to the final. Shrewsbury lost the match 3–1 at Wembley Stadium and missed out on promotion to League One.

=== Luton Town ===
On 26 June 2007, Edwards signed for Luton Town on a three-year contract. As he was under 24, Shrewsbury commanded a compensation fee to cover his youth development. The eventual fee was agreed at a tribunal, but clubs reported differing figures; Luton claiming it was £250,000, with Shrewsbury reporting £250,000 as the initial payment, plus a further £150,000 based on appearances. He made his debut on the opening day of 2007–08, starting in Luton's 2–1 home win over Hartlepool United. Edwards scored his first goal for Luton with the equaliser in a 2–1 away defeat to Swindon Town a week later.

Edwards made 19 league appearances for Luton Town in League One and scored four goals. However, the club was struggling financially and were only able to pay their players' weekly wages twice in three months, hence a 10-point deduction. He became linked with Championship teams Watford and Nottingham Forest after a strong performance in an FA Cup third round match at home to Liverpool. Luton accepted a £675,000 offer from Wolverhampton Wanderers.

=== Wolverhampton Wanderers ===
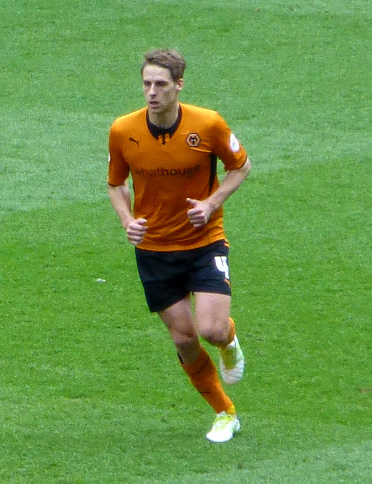
Edwards playing for Wolverhampton Wanderers in 2014

On 14 January 2008, Edwards signed a two-and-a-half-year contract with Wolverhampton Wanderers. Five days after signing, Edwards made a goalscoring debut for the club in a 2–0 win away to Scunthorpe United. However, injuries kept him from playing a regular role in the remainder of the season. He returned fit for the following season, but found new signing David Jones often preferred alongside captain Karl Henry in central midfield; however, Edwards still started half the season's games as they won promotion to the Premier League. Following the conclusion of the season, Edwards signed a new three-year contract with the club.

The midfielder became a regular in the team after promotion, and contributed the winning goal against Fulham in the first home win of the season on 20 September 2009. He suffered ankle ligament damage that December which kept him out for four months, but he recovered to make five appearances in the closing months as the club retained their top-flight status. Edwards' contribution to Wolves in the 2010–11 season was severely hampered by injuries. He signed a new three-year contract with the club, including an option of a one-year extension, and made 12 appearances, scoring once in a 2–1 victory at home to Manchester City, where he scored past his former Shrewsbury teammate, and lodger, Joe Hart.

Edwards suffered two injury setbacks during the 2012–13 season, when he firstly tore his hamstring in December in a 4–1 win away to Bristol City, and after returning to first-team action, suffered a broken foot in the reverse fixture. Edwards remained with the club after they suffered a second consecutive relegation, scoring nine goals as the team won promotion back to the Championship at the first attempt as League One champions. On 13 June 2014, Edwards signed a new two-year contract with the club.

On 8 August 2015, he scored the winning goal in Wolves' first game of the 2015–16 season away to Blackburn Rovers, finishing Nouha Dicko's cross with his hand. Manager Kenny Jackett said after the game that the goal was scored by Edwards' hand, albeit not deliberately. Five days later, he signed a one-year contract extension to last until 2017. On 23 January 2016, Edwards broke the fifth metatarsal in his foot during a 1–1 draw away to Queens Park Rangers, ruling him out for three months. He returned to first-team football on 5 April as a 92nd-minute substitute for Joe Mason in a 2–1 win away to Milton Keynes Dons.

=== Reading ===
On 26 August 2017, Edwards signed for fellow Championship club Reading on a two-year contract for an undisclosed fee, reported by the Express & Star as £1 million. He made his debut as a 63rd-minute substitute for Liam Kelly in a 1–0 defeat at home to Bristol City on 9 September. Edwards scored his first goal for Reading on 26 September in a 2–1 defeat away to Millwall. On 3 April 2018 he was sent off for the first time in his 539-game career, after half an hour of a 3–0 loss at Aston Villa.

=== Return to Shrewsbury Town ===
Edwards re-signed for League One club Shrewsbury Town on 7 January 2019 on a two-and-a-half-year contract. Four days later he made his second debut in a 3–0 home loss to Charlton Athletic, replacing Oliver Norburn for the final 12 minutes. In his next game on 9 February, he was shown a straight red card for a foul on Chris Lines in a 1–1 draw at Bristol Rovers. Shrewsbury unsuccessfully appealed the dismissal. His season ended in April after six games with an ankle injury in training, and manager Sam Ricketts said that Edwards would improve following a pre-season.

On 12 May 2021 it was announced that he would leave Shrewsbury at the end of the season, following the expiry of his contract.

=== Bala Town ===
Following his release from Shrewsbury, Edwards expressed a desire to drop into part-time football. On 10 June 2021, he signed for Cymru Premier side Bala Town. Edwards made a flying start to his Bala Town career, notching 4 goals in his first 6 Cymru Premier matches and establishing himself as a key player for the Lakesiders. Edwards left Bala Town after two years.

== Coaching career ==
On 29 January 2026, Edwards was named assistant head coach of Shrewsbury Town alongside former Shrewsbury Town team mate, Gavin Cowan who assumed the role of Head Coach, following the departure of Michael Appleton.

== International career ==
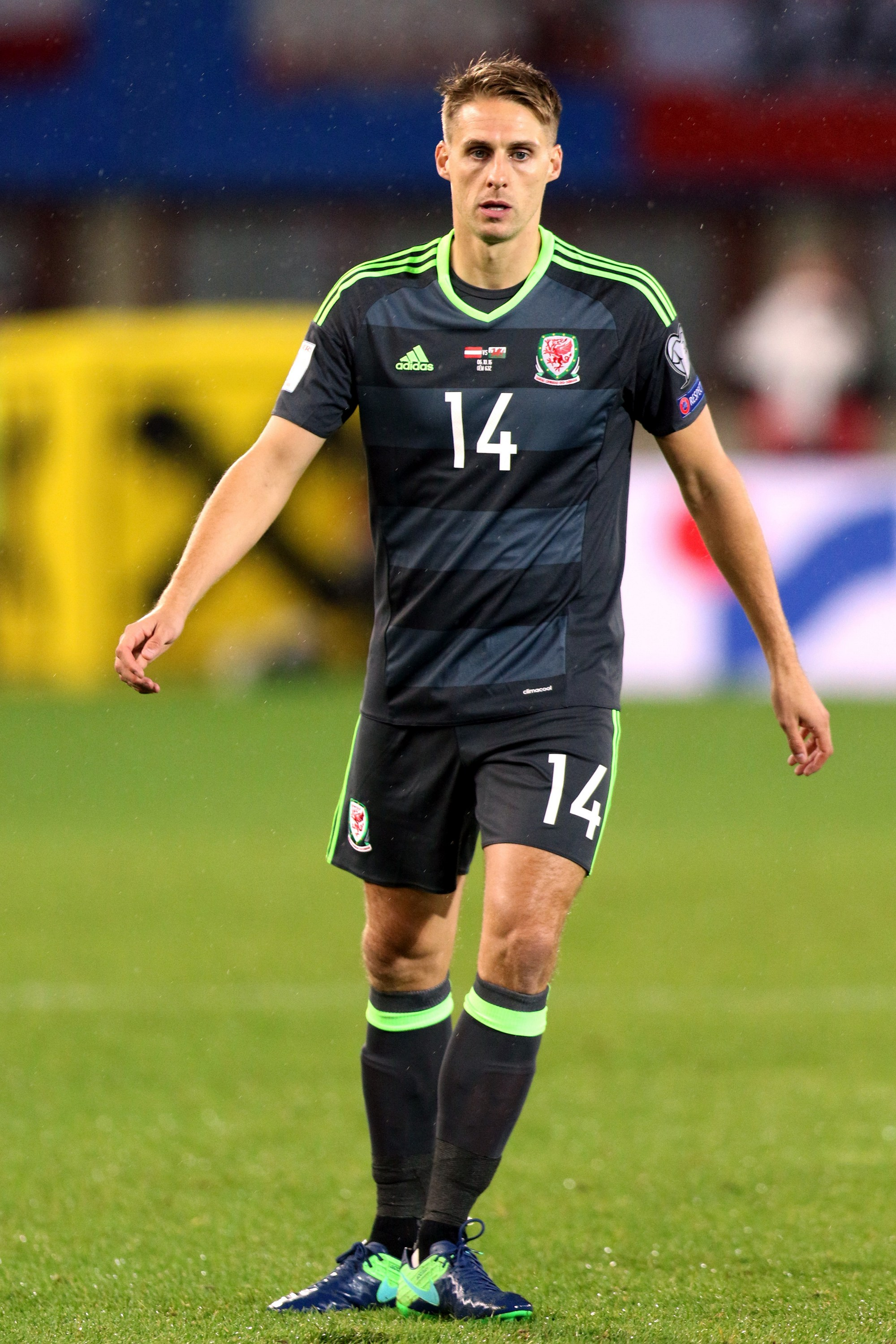
Edwards playing for Wales in 2016

Edwards qualifies for Wales through his father from Welshpool. He had previously played for the Wales U17 and U19 teams making his U21 debut against Cyprus on 16 May 2006. He had been selected for the under-21 squad for an earlier friendly against Northern Ireland on 28 February 2006, but missed the match through injury.

His first experience with the senior team was under John Toshack on 12 September 2007, remaining an unused substitute against Slovakia. He made his full international debut on 17 November against the Republic of Ireland at the Millennium Stadium as a 37th-minute substitute for Carl Robinson in a 2–2 UEFA Euro 2008 qualifying match.

On 10 October 2008, Edwards scored the opening goal in a 2010 World Cup qualifier against Liechtenstein, and against Azerbaijan on 6 June 2009. He ended the campaign with two goals. Following Wales' disappointing qualifying campaign, he was called up again for 14 November 2009 friendly against Scotland, a 3–0 win, and opened the scoring with a volley from Aaron Ramsey's assist in the 16th minute.

He retired from international football on 15 March 2018.

== Personal life ==
Edwards attended Pontesbury's Mary Webb School and Science College and shared a house with England international Joe Hart during their days at Shrewsbury Town. Edwards still resides in Pontesbury with his wife Emma and their two children.

In 2015, Edwards and a friend opened a children's indoor soft play centre in Shrewsbury called Little Rascals. In 2017, Edwards launched his charity, The Little Rascals Foundation, aiming to help children with disabilities. The charity launch event, hosted by Jacqui Oatley with guest speaker Kit Symons, in the absence of Wales national football team manager Chris Coleman, was held at the New Meadow, the home of Edwards' hometown club Shrewsbury Town, and raised just under £13,000. He was the first active professional footballer to endorse the Offside Trust, founded after the reveal of the United Kingdom football sexual abuse scandal in 2016.

Edwards wrote an autobiography, Living My Dream, which was released in December 2017. All proceeds went to his foundation.

In December 2021 Edwards, with his ex Shrewsbury Town teammates Sam Aiston and Gavin Cowan, launched the podcast, In The Stiffs.

== Career statistics ==
=== Club ===
As of end of 2020–21 season

Appearances and goals by club, season and competition
Club	Season	League			FA Cup		League Cup		Other		Total	
Club	Season	Division	Apps	Goals	Apps	Goals	Apps	Goals	Apps	Goals	Apps	Goals
Shrewsbury Town	2002–03	Third Division	1	0	0	0	0	0	0	0	1	0
Shrewsbury Town	2003–04	Football Conference	16	0	0	0	—		6 (Note: Five appearances in FA Trophy, one in Football Conference play-offs)	0	22	0
Shrewsbury Town	2004–05	League Two	27	5	1	0	1	0	1 (Note: Appearance(s) in Football League Trophy)	0	30	5
Shrewsbury Town	2005–06	League Two	30	2	2	2	0	0	1	0	33	4
Shrewsbury Town	2006–07	League Two	45	5	2	0	1	0	3	1	51	6
Shrewsbury Town	Total		119	12	5	2	2	0	11	1	137	15
Luton Town	2007–08	League One	19	4	4	0	2	0	1	0	26	4
Wolverhampton Wanderers	2007–08	Championship	10	1	—		—		—		10	1
Wolverhampton Wanderers	2008–09	Championship	44	3	2	0	2	0	—		48	3
Wolverhampton Wanderers	2009–10	Premier League	20	1	0	0	1	0	—		21	1
Wolverhampton Wanderers	2010–11	Premier League	15	1	2	0	1	0	—		18	1
Wolverhampton Wanderers	2011–12	Premier League	26	3	0	0	2	1	—		28	4
Wolverhampton Wanderers	2012–13	Championship	24	2	0	0	1	0	—		25	2
Wolverhampton Wanderers	2013–14	League One	30	9	1	0	0	0	0	0	31	9
Wolverhampton Wanderers	2014–15	Championship	41	6	2	2	1	0	—		44	8
Wolverhampton Wanderers	2015–16	Championship	29	5	1	0	0	0	—		30	5
Wolverhampton Wanderers	2016–17	Championship	44	10	3	0	2	0	—		49	10
Wolverhampton Wanderers	2017–18	Championship	1	0	—		2	0	—		3	0
Wolverhampton Wanderers	Total		284	41	11	2	12	1	0	0	307	44
Reading	2017–18	Championship	32	3	3	0	—		—		35	3
Reading	2018–19	Championship	0	0	0	0	0	0	—		0	0
Reading	Total		32	3	3	0	0	0	—		35	3
Shrewsbury Town	2018–19	League One	6	0	0	0	—		0	0	6	0
Shrewsbury Town	2019–20	League One	29	1	5	1	0	0	3 (Note: Appearance(s) in EFL Trophy)	2	37	4
Shrewsbury Town	2020–21	League One	31	1	3	0	1	0	1	0	36	1
Shrewsbury Town	Total		66	2	8	1	1	0	4	2	79	5
Career total			520	62	31	5	17	1	16	3	584	71

=== International ===
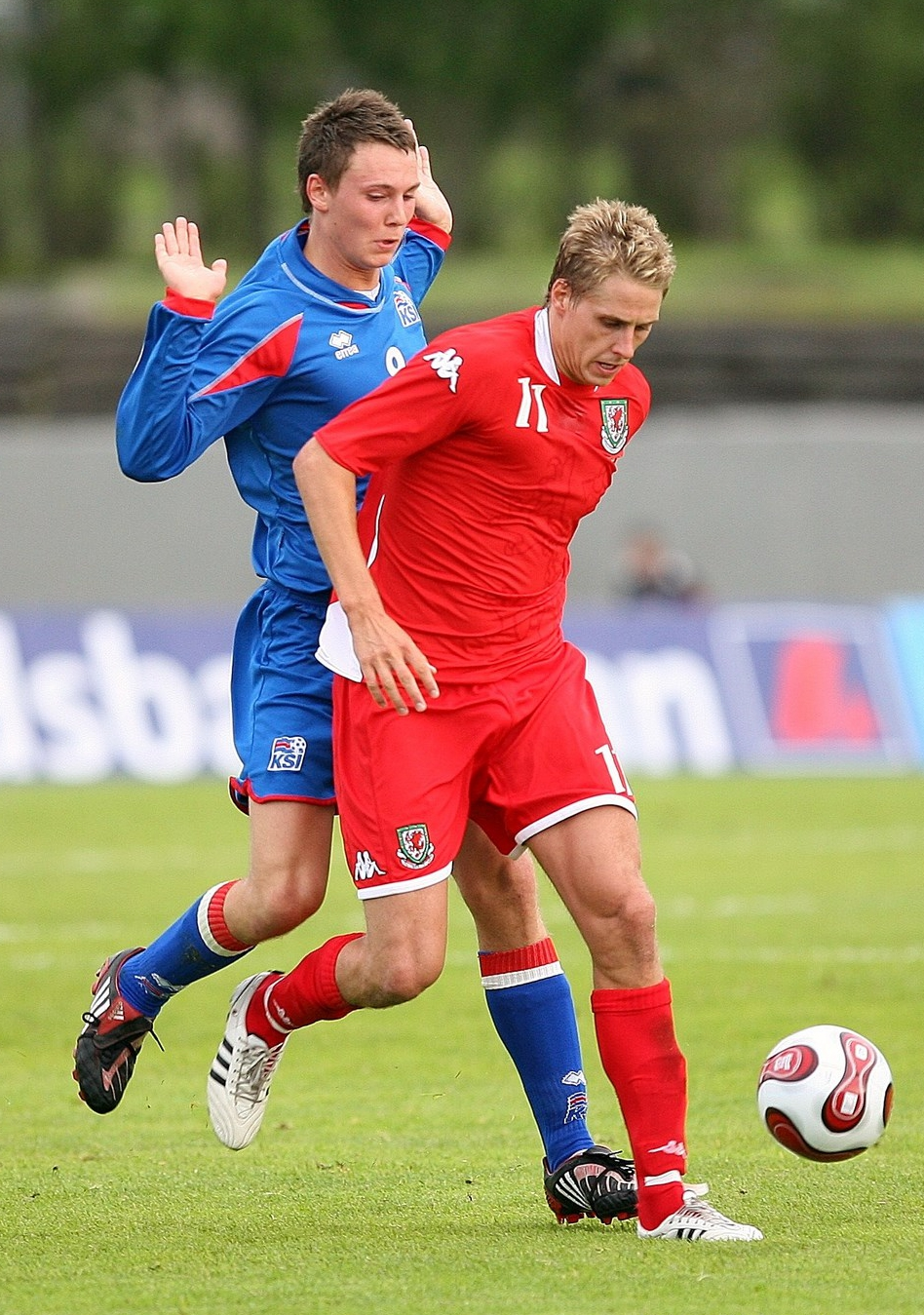
Edwards playing for Wales in 2008

Appearances and goals by national team and year
National team	Year	Apps	Goals
Wales	2007	2	0
Wales	2008	8	1
Wales	2009	8	2
Wales	2010	4	0
Wales	2011	1	0
Wales	2012	3	0
Wales	2014	1	0
Wales	2015	4	0
Wales	2016	7	0
Wales	2017	5	0
Total		43	3

Wales score listed first, score column indicates score after each Edwards goal.

List of international goals scored by David Edwards
No.	Date	Venue	Cap	Opponent	Score	Result	Competition	Ref.
1	11 October 2008	Millennium Stadium, Cardiff, Wales	8	Liechtenstein	1–0	2–0	2010 FIFA World Cup qualification	
2	6 June 2009	Tofiq Bahramov Republican Stadium, Baku, Azerbaijan	14	Azerbaijan	1–0	1–0	2010 FIFA World Cup qualification	
3	14 November 2009	Cardiff City Stadium, Cardiff, Wales	18	Scotland	1–0	3–0	Friendly	

== Honours ==
Shrewsbury Town

- Football Conference play-offs: 2004

Wolverhampton Wanderers

- Football League Championship: 2008–09
- Football League One: 2013–14
