= Sedgemore =

Sedgemore is a surname. Notable people with the surname include:

- Ben Sedgemore (born 1975), English footballer
- Brian Sedgemore (1937–2015), British politician
- Jake Sedgemore (born 1978), English footballer, brother of Ben
