= Glenn Tolley =

Welsh footballer

Personal information
- Full name: Glenn Anthony Tolley
- Date of birth: 24 September 1983 (age 43)
- Place of birth: Knighton, Wales
- Position: Midfielder

Senior career*
Years	Team	Apps	(Gls)
2002–2004	Shrewsbury Town	8	(0)
2004	Northwich Victoria	10	(0)
2004–2006	AFC Telford United	80	(20)
2006–2008	Newtown	54	(22)
2008–2010	Presteigne St. Andrews	?	(?)
2013–2014	Knighton Town	3	(0)

International career
- Wales U20
- * Club domestic league appearances and goals

Glenn Anthony Tolley (born 24 September 1983) is a Welsh former footballer who played as a midfielder for Shrewsbury Town in The Football League. He is the cousin of professional footballer Jamie Tolley.

He made his debut for the Shrews on 5 October 2002 in the Third Division 0–1 defeat to Hartlepool United at Gay Meadow. In 2004, he signed for Conference club Northwich Victoria, after terminating his contract by mutual consent.

During summer 2004 Glenn joined the newly formed AFC Telford United after the collapse of the original Telford United. In 2006 Glenn join Welsh Premier League side Newtown A.F.C. where he captained the side making 54 appearances scoring 22 goals. Left Newtown in 2008 due to work commitments and Joined his local team Presteigne St. Andrews F.C.ve

November 2013 Glenn signed for home town club Knighton Town in Mid Wales League Division 2 helping them to a 3rd-place finish and reaching the semi-final of The Central Wales F.A. Cup.

Glenn also played for Wales at various youth levels and gained 1 Welsh u20 cap vs England in 2003.
