= Steve Jagielka =

English footballer (1978–2021)

Personal information
- Full name: Stephen Jagielka
- Date of birth: 10 March 1978
- Place of birth: Sale, England
- Date of death: 17 March 2021 (aged 43)
- Place of death: Rodington, Shropshire, England
- Height: 5 ft 8 in (1.73 m)
- Position: Midfielder

Youth career
- 1993–1995: Stoke City

Senior career*
Years	Team	Apps	(Gls)
1996–1997	Stoke City	0	(0)
1997–2003	Shrewsbury Town	176	(18)
2003–2004	Sheffield United	0	(0)
2004–2006	Accrington Stanley	68	(9)
2006–2007	Droylsden		
2007–2009	AFC Telford United		
2009–2012	Hednesford Town		
2012	Ellesmere Rangers		
- Market Drayton Town
Total		244	(27)
- * Club domestic league appearances and goals

Stephen Jagielka (10 March 1978 – 17 March 2021) was an English professional footballer who played as a midfielder.

== Career ==
Having begun his career without success at Stoke City, Jagielka broke through at Shrewsbury Town, where he spent six seasons before falling out of favour under Jimmy Quinn as they were relegated to the Conference in 2003. He then moved to Sheffield United for a season, where despite the presence of his younger brother Phil and a good relationship with manager Neil Warnock, he did not play a first-team match. Jagielka then spent two seasons at Accrington Stanley, contributing to their promotion to the Football League as Conference champions in 2006.

Jagielka subsequently spent a season at Droylsden, helping them win promotion to the Conference National, but decided to leave due to difficulties navigating from Shrewsbury where he had a plumbing business. To remain in Shropshire he signed a one-year deal with AFC Telford United of the Conference North after initiating a phonecall with their manager. It was followed by playing for Hednesford Town and Shropshire teams Ellesmere Rangers and Market Drayton.

== Personal life ==
Of Polish and Scottish descent, he was the elder brother of Premier League footballer Phil Jagielka. After retiring from football, he worked for Caterpillar Inc. and for his own plumbing business. He was formerly married to Jo Fallows, with whom he had three children.

On 17 March 2021, it was announced that Jagielka, who was living in Rodington, Shropshire, had died aged 43. An inquest into his death heard that Jagielka had drugs in his system, with a pathologist giving the cause of his death as aspiration pneumonia due to methadone toxicity.

== Career statistics ==
Appearances and goals by club, season and competition
Club	Season	League			FA Cup		League Cup		Other		Total	
Club	Season	Division	Apps	Goals	Apps	Goals	Apps	Goals	Apps	Goals	Apps	Goals
Stoke City	1996–97	First Division	0	0	0	0	0	0	0	0	0	0
Shrewsbury Town	1997–98	Third Division	16	1	0	0	2	0	0	0	18	1
Shrewsbury Town	1998–99	Third Division	31	1	1	0	2	0	1	0	35	1
Shrewsbury Town	1999–2000	Third Division	33	1	2	1	1	0	1	1	37	2
Shrewsbury Town	2000–01	Third Division	31	6	1	0	1	0	0	0	33	6
Shrewsbury Town	2001–02	Third Division	31	5	1	0	1	0	1	0	34	5
Shrewsbury Town	2002–03	Third Division	23	3	3	0	0	0	4	0	30	3
Shrewsbury Town	2003–04	Football Conference	11	1	0	0	0	0	0	0	11	1
Shrewsbury Town	Total		176	18	8	1	7	0	7	1	198	20
Sheffield United	2003–04	First Division	0	0	0	0	0	0	0	0	0	0
Accrington Stanley	2004–05	Football Conference	38	3	0	0	0	0	1	0	39	3
Accrington Stanley	2005–06	Football Conference	30	6	0	0	0	0	1	0	31	6
Accrington Stanley	Total		68	9	0	0	0	0	2	0	70	9
Career total			244	27	8	1	7	0	9	1	268	29

== Honours ==
Accrington Stanley

- Conference National: 2005–06
