= Walter Tarplin =

English footballer

Personal information
- Full name: Walter Tarplin
- Date of birth: 30 March 1879
- Place of birth: Small Heath, England
- Date of death: 1937 (aged 57–58)
- Position: Inside forward

Senior career*
Years	Team	Apps	(Gls)
1901–1902	Small Heath Albion		
1902–1903	Coventry City		
1903–1908	Notts County	97	(25)
1908–1909	Reading		
1909	Stafford Rangers		
1909	Shrewsbury Town		
Total		97	(25)
- * Club domestic league appearances and goals

Walter Tarplin (30 March 1879–1937) was an English footballer who played in the Football League for Notts County.
