= Nantwich Town F.C. =

Association football club in England

Coordinates: 53°04′22″N 2°31′42″W

- Full name: Nantwich Town Football Club
- Nickname: The Dabbers
- Founded: 1884; 142 years ago (as Nantwich F.C.)
- Ground: Swansway Stadium, Nantwich
- Capacity: 3,500 (343 seated)
- Chairman: Jon Gold
- Manager: Luke Goddard
- League: Northern Premier League Division One West
- 2025–26: Northern Premier League Division One West, 9th of 22
- Website: www.nantwichtownfc.co.uk
Home colours	Away colours

Nantwich Town Football Club is a semi-professional football club based in Nantwich, Cheshire, England. The club was founded in 1884 and is nicknamed The Dabbers, a reference to the town's tanning industry. They currently compete in the Northern Premier League Division One West and play their home matches at the Weaver Stadium - for sponsorship reasons, also known as the 'Swansway Stadium'.

In 1995, in an FA Cup preliminary-round tie against Droylsden, Andy Locke scored the fastest ever FA Cup hat-trick, in 2 minutes 20 seconds. As of April 2026, this record still stands for a hat-trick in any round of the FA Cup, including the preliminary rounds before the First Round. Nantwich qualified for the FA Cup first round proper in 2011, 2017 and 2019.

Nantwich Town won the FA Vase on 6 May 2006. Two goals from Andy Kinsey and one from Stuart Scheuber produced a 3–1 win over Hillingdon Borough at St Andrew's.

Nantwich followed up their FA Vase winning season with a successful promotion campaign in 2006–07. Finishing third in the North West Counties League Division One, they were promoted to the Northern Premier League Division One South for the 2007–08 season and then gained a second consecutive promotion, to the Northern Premier League Premier Division.

Nantwich also progressed to the semi-final stage of the FA Trophy in 2015–16, losing 6–4 over two legs to FC Halifax Town.

== History ==
=== 1884–2004 ===
Founded in 1884, Nantwich spent early years playing friendly and cup matches but in 1892 the club joined the Shropshire & District League, finishing as runners-up in the first season.

Nantwich moved into the stronger Combination the following season and on 15 October 1892 hosted Liverpool in the Merseysiders' first ever FA Cup match (Liverpool won the first qualifying-round tie 4–0).

In those early years, the club had A. N. Hornby as president. Hornby captained England at rugby and cricket and, as well as being President, turned out for the club on several occasions.

Before World War I, Nantwich also had spells in a variety of leagues including the North Staffs & District, the Crewe & District, Manchester and Lancashire Combination leagues. After the war, the club became founder members of the Cheshire County League in which they were perennial strugglers, though they did finish 6th in 1921–22. The season before, a record home attendance of 5,121 watched the Dabbers play Winsford United in the Cheshire Senior Cup at their temporary home at Kingsley Fields (now the location of the club's current ground). In 1933 the Dabbers won the Cheshire Senior Cup after beating ICI (Alkali) at the Drill Field, Northwich in front of 8,000 fans

After World War II, the Dabbers joined the newly founded Mid Cheshire League in 1948 and in 1952, the club entered the inaugural FA Youth Cup competition. Drawn against Manchester United in the second round, the young Dabbers crashed 23–0 on a November evening at the Cliff training ground to a United youth line up including Duncan Edwards, David Pegg, Albert Scanlon and Ronnie Cope (who joined Nantwich in the twilight of his career).

In the 1963–64 season the club completed a treble, winning the Mid Cheshire League, League Cup and Cheshire Amateur Cup under manager Alan Ball (senior). According to former player the late Mike Brookes:

"Mr Ball trained us very hard and taught us techniques that were new to us – or were rusty. He made us think ‘the game’ more. One ploy was when we were attacking – for me as centre forward to mark the centre half out of the game. The other forwards could still use me for the one–two wall pass to break through. I could still spin off the centre forward to join the attack. I did get a few bruises this way! At a corner – the other forwards would move away from the penalty spot, thus taking markers with them. I would be way out on the edge of the penalty box – running in at speed when the corner was taken – hoping the kick (as planned) ended up at head height on the penalty spot. Mr Ball used the fear factor to keep us ‘on the ball’. He would bring along ‘reputation’ players to training or ‘sign them on’ and have them turn up for matches; so we thought we could be dropped and sometimes we were."

Nantwich rejoined the Cheshire League in 1968 and in 1976 the Dabbers beat NPL champions Runcorn 5–4 in the Cheshire Senior Cup Final at Gresty Road in front of 2237. In May 1981 a crowd of 1078 saw Nantwich clinch the Cheshire League by beating eventual runners-up Hyde United 2–1 in the penultimate game of the season.

In 1982 Nantwich were founder members of the North West Counties League. The club finished bottom and were relegated to Division 2 where the club remained (except for one season in Division 3 in 1986) until 1989 when the Dabbers were promoted to Division One. In the 1993–94 season, they finished in their then highest NWCFL placing of fourth. In April 1995, Nantwich defeated Trafford 1–0 in the League Cup Final at Gigg Lane, Bury (two years earlier at the same venue Nantwich had lost 2–1 to Burscough in the same competition). In 1995, in an F.A. Cup preliminary-round tie against Droylsden, Andy Locke scored the fastest ever FA Cup hat-trick, in 2 minutes 20 seconds. This record still stands for a hat-trick in any round of the FA Cup, including the qualifying rounds before the First Round. Ex-Stoke City player Nigel Gleghorn was appointed manager in November 2001 and helped steer Nantwich to a top six finish in 2003, when the club also attained the FA Charter Standard Community Club award.

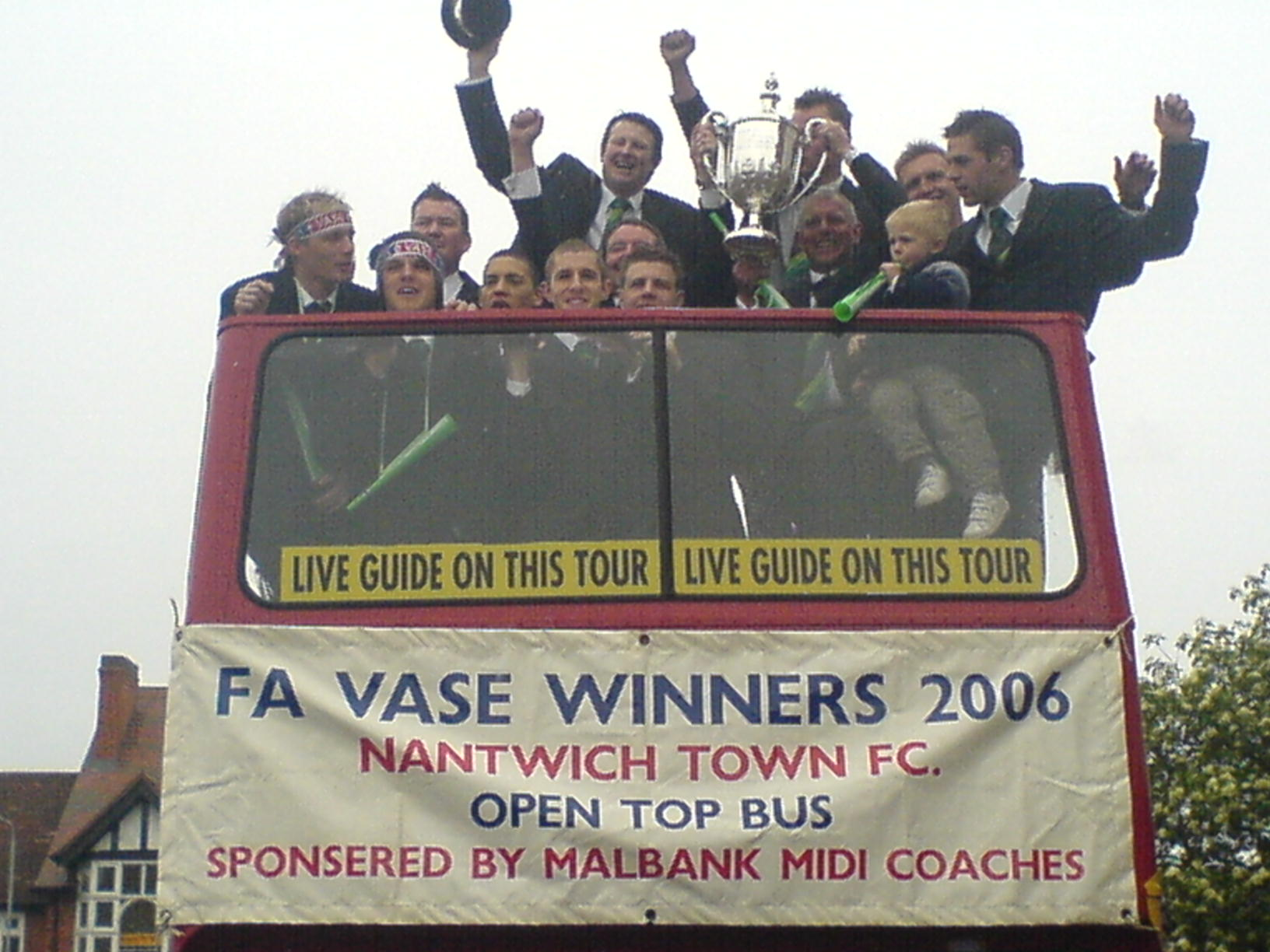
The open-top bus on arrival at Nantwich Civic Hall in Market Street. The FA Vase is raised aloft.

=== Steve Davis era (2004-2009) ===
Gleghorn left the club in the 2004 close season and former Crewe Alexandra, Burnley and Barnsley defender Steve Davis was appointed as head coach. Davis, assisted by former Nantwich and Macclesfield striker Peter Hall, proved to be the most successful manager in the club's history. His five years in charge saw two promotions and both FA Vase and County cup glory.

Davis led Nantwich to FA Vase victory in 2005–06 when the Dabbers beat Hillingdon Borough 3–1 in the final at Birmingham City's St Andrew's stadium. En route to the final, Nantwich kept a clean sheet in eight out of nine ties including victories over Buxton (1–0) and Cammell Laird (5–0 in the two-legged semi-final). Andy Kinsey hit two goals in the final, but dislocated his shoulder celebrating the second. Following the victory, the club paraded the Vase in an open-top bus. In the league, Nantwich equalled their highest ever finish (4th), narrowly missing promotion.

In 2006–07 they finished third and secured promotion to the Northern Premier League, amassing 95 points and 108 goals from 42 games. During the season Nantwich recorded their highest post-war league attendance (1,536) against FC United of Manchester. To sign off the home campaign, a crowd of 1,071 saw the last game at the 123-year-old Jackson Avenue ground when Nantwich beat Squires Gate 5–2 on 28 April 2007.

In the 2007–08 season Nantwich Town finished third in the Northern Premier League Division One South. This qualified them for the play-offs in which they came from behind to beat Grantham Town 2–1 and then beat Sheffield 4–1 on penalties after a 2–2 draw in front of a season's best crowd of 1,354. This double promotion meant Nantwich played the 2008–09 season in the Northern Premier League Premier Division. They also won the Cheshire Senior Cup beating higher-ranked teams Hyde United and Northwich Victoria en route to a win in the final on penalties over Conference side Altrincham after a 3–3 draw.

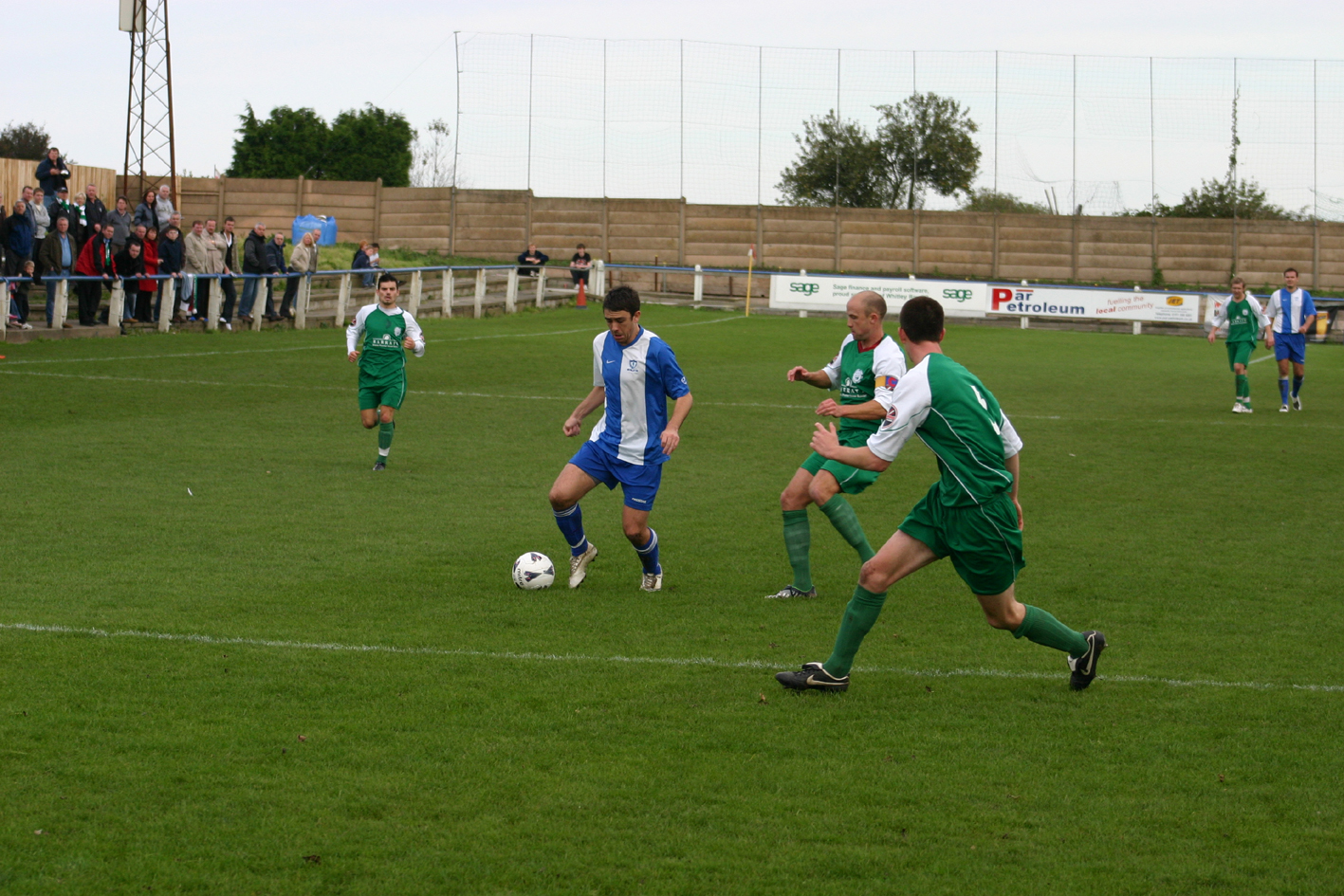
Nantwich Town play Whitley Bay in 2008

In 2008–09 Nantwich finished third in the table but lost to Ilkeston Town in the play-off final. Nantwich also had a good run in the FA Cup beating FC United of Manchester 4–3 in a replay, FC Halifax Town 4–1 and Whitley Bay 5–1 before losing to Fleetwood Town 4–3 in the 4th Qualifying round. Stand-out results in the league were 5–0 home and away defeats of Boston United, a 3–0 home win over FC United of Manchester.

In the 2009 close season Steve Davis left for the assistant manager's job at Crewe to be replaced by his long-time assistant Peter Hall (despite applications from former Port Vale players Dave Brammer and Dean Glover).

=== 2009 to present day ===
In the 2009–10 pre-season, the club celebrated its 125th anniversary with a new badge and the release of a book chronicling the history of the club, entitled Proud To Be The Dabbers. The main season was disappointing, with the team languishing towards the bottom of the table, and early exits from the FA Cup, the FA Trophy and Cheshire Senior Cup. The poor form resulted in head coach Peter Hall losing his job in late March; Kevin Street and Darren Tinson took over on a caretaker basis. They delivered an immediate improvement, with five wins and a draw in the next six games. The Dabbers finished 10th.

The 2010–11 season began with several heavy pre-season defeats followed by various league defeats and an FA Cup defeat by lower league Whitley Bay. In October, with Nantwich 21st in the table, they came back from a 6–2 deficit to draw 6–6 with Mickleover Sports. The comeback sparked a revival in the Dabbers' fortunes, with one defeat in the next 10 games and the managerial duo of Street and Tinson receiving the Manager of the Month award for November. However, on 10 March 2011, after a six-game pointless streak, it was announced that the pair were leaving by mutual consent. Director of football Jimmy Quinn took charge of first-team affairs.

After saving the club from relegation, he set about improving the squad for the 2011–12 season, bringing in experienced players. Striker Ben Mills, signed from Stafford Rangers went on to score 12 goals for the club until his January move to Macclesfield Town. After defeating Ramsbottom United, Northwich Victoria, Kendal Town and Nuneaton Town, Nantwich reached the First Round of the FA Cup for the first time. They played Milton Keynes Dons F.C. away, losing 6–0 in front of 4070 fans. In the NPL, Nantwich finished 10th, but also won the Cheshire Senior Cup beating Stalybridge Celtic in the final.

After an impressive pre-season, and an opening day 5–0 away win over Matlock Town, hopes were high for Nantwich, but 2012-13 performances declined, and boss Jimmy Quinn was fired in February. Darren Moss took over as a player-manager and Nantwich ended the season 14th. Chorley ended the Dabbers' FA Cup hopes in the 1st qualifying round and AFC Fylde overcame Nantwich in the FA Trophy.

In 2013–14, managed by Danny Johnson, Nantwich finished 19th, despite not winning any of their last nine games. FA Cup hopes ended in the 1st qualifying round with defeat by Rugby Town and FA Trophy hopes were ended in the 3rd qualifying round by Northwich Victoria. Johnson's second season saw little improvement, and he lost his job in February 2015, being replaced by ex-player Phil Parkinson, assisted by Neil Sorvel and Danny Griggs. An improvement in results and performances meant Nantwich finished lower mid-table, with an FA Cup defeat to Salford City and an FA Trophy defeat to Ramsbottom United.

In 2015–16, Nantwich enjoyed an FA Trophy run, reaching the semi-final stage. In the 1st qualifying round Nantwich beat Salford City 2–1, followed by a 5–1 defeat of Kings Lynn Town with a hat trick from Liam Shotton. Nantwich then won 2–0 at higher league Stockport County. Into the competition proper, Nantwich beat Matlock Town 2–0 at home, before an away draw against Bradford Park Avenue after which Nantwich won the replay 5–0. After two postponements, a last minute header from Steve Jones gave Nantwich a 1–0 win over Stourbridge. In the quarter final, Nantwich beat Conference team Dover Athletic 2–1 with another last minute goal, from Liam Shotton. The semi-finals were against Halifax. In front of a record crowd of 2,078 at the Weaver Stadium, Halifax won the first leg 4–2. The second leg at the Shay ended in a 2–2 draw, giving Halifax a 6–4 aggregate victory. The club finished in 8th place in the league, with 75 points. They also scored 94 league goals, the second highest total.

Nantwich finished 5th in the Northern Premier League in 2016–17, qualifying for the play-offs for the first time in eight years. However, a 2–0 defeat to Spennymoor ended promotion hopes. An FA cup run to the 4th qualifying round saw wins over Ashton United, Marine and Halesowen Town but Stourbridge ran out 3–1 winners at the Weaver Stadium. In the Cheshire Senior Cup final, Nantwich lost 3–2 to neighbours Crewe Alexandra at Gresty Road. At the end of the season, manager Phil Parkinson left the club for Altrincham, along with several of the team.

The 2017–18 season saw Nantwich get to the first round of the FA cup for the second time. They beat City of Liverpool FC 2–1, Shepshed Dynamo 1–0, Nuneaton Town 3–1 and Kettering Town 1–0 in a replay. They lost 5–0 in the first round to Stevenage. After a 16th-place finish in the league, Nantwich earned their second consecutive Cheshire Senior Cup final, winning 3–0 against Stockport Town to claim their fifth Senior Cup.

In 2018–19, Nantwich finished fourth in the Northern Premier League table, their second-highest finish in the league, and missed out on promotion after losing to Warrington Town in the play-off semi-final. They also claimed their second consecutive Cheshire Senior Cup, beating North-West Counties Football League outfit Cammell Laird 5–2 in the final. Striker Joe Malkin won the league's Young Player of the Year award, while Sean Cooke was voted into the league's Team of the Season. Manager Dave Cooke also grabbed national headlines in January by bringing in former Premier League and Stoke City striker Ricardo Fuller to the club.

In November 2019, Nantwich reached the First Round of the FA Cup for a third time, losing 1–0 to AFC Fylde at the Weaver Stadium.

The 2022–23 season saw Nantwich relegated to the Northern Premier League West Division after a 15-year sojourn in the top division of the Northern Premier League.

== Stadium ==
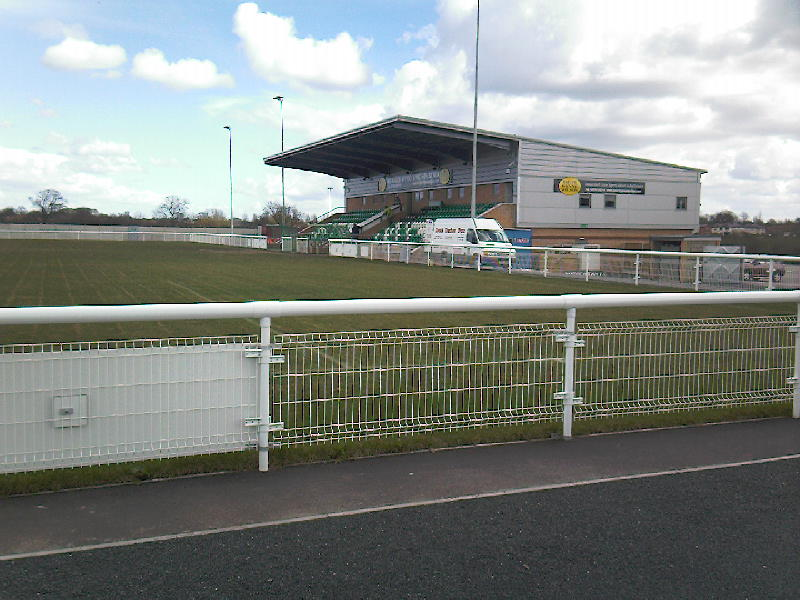
Weaver Stadium

The club plays at the Weaver Stadium, also known, for sponsorship reasons, as the Swansway Stadium, at Kingsley Fields. The ground cost £4 million, and was opened in 2007 before the start of the 2007–08 season; previously the club had played at Jackson Avenue#.

Bad weather delayed the opening of the ground, with Nantwich having to play the majority of their pre-season games away from home. The first match at the Weaver Stadium took place on 7 August 2007, a friendly against League One side Port Vale that ended 6–3 to the League side. Port Vale's Ross Davidson scored the first goal at the ground after three minutes; Glynn Blackhurst became the first Nantwich Town player to score. The ground was officially opened before Nantwich's match on 10 October 2007 by Sir Trevor Brooking. Moving to the new stadium coupled with success on the pitch helped increase Nantwich's attendances from an average of 118 in 2005–06 to averaging 664 in 2008–09. In 2023 the grass pitch was removed to be replaced with a new 3G surface

=== Swansway Motor Group Main Stand ===
The main stand was renamed the Swansway Motor Group Main Stand in July 2021. It is the main stand at the Weaver Stadium and is situated to the south of the pitch. It seats around 300 people. It also contains bar facilities and a snack bar. As of the 2022/23 season, Swansway Motor Group are also the Main Stadium Sponsors.

=== Whitby Morrison Ice Cream Vans Stand ===
The Whitby Morrison Ice Cream Vans Stand is a low terrace situated to the north of the pitch at the Weaver Stadium. It can hold around 295 standing supporters. It is home to the more vocal of the Dabbers' support

At present both ends of the ground are flat and undeveloped.

== Current squad ==
As of 31 May 2026 Note: Flags indicate national team as defined under FIFA eligibility rules; some limited exceptions apply. Players may hold more than one non-FIFA nationality.

No.	Pos.	Nation	Player
—	GK	ENG	Ben Garratt
—	DF	ENG	Ben Hockenhull
—	DF	ENG	Kelvin Mellor
—	DF	ENG	Paddy Kennedy
—	DF	ENG	Perry Bircumshaw
—	DF	ENG	Aidy Roxburgh

No.	Pos.	Nation	Player
—	MF	ENG	Fenton Green
—	MF	ENG	Joe Robbins
—	MF	ENG	Patrick Jarrett
—	MF	ENG	Byron Moore
—	FW	ENG	Ollie Pope
—	FW	ENG	Byron Harrison
—	FW	WAL	Callum Saunders

== Non-playing staff ==
=== Management ===
- Manager:
  - Luke Goddard
- Assistant Manager:
  - Marc Feighery
- First Team Coach:
  - Vacant
- Goalkeeping Coach:
  - Miles Couling
- Sports Therapist:
  - Callum Carey
- Kit Staff:
  - TBA

=== Officials ===
- Chairman:
  - Jon Gold
- Vice-chairman:
  - John Dunning
- Club President:
  - Frank Blunstone
- Life Vice-presidents:
  - Clive Jackson
  - Peter Temmen
- Directors:
  - Dave Clapp
  - John Dunning
  - Jon Gold
  - Gary Johnson
  - Daniel Dunning-Cole
  - Tim Crighton
  - Carl "Schume" Thorpe Technical Director
  - Cate Walter
- Media Officers
  - Jack Beresford
  - Liam Price
  - Adam Bateman
- Programme Editor
  - Carl "Schume" Thorpe
- Stadium Announcer
  - Neil Davis

== Honours and records ==
=== Honours ===
- FA Vase
  - Winners 2005–06
- Cheshire County League
  - Champions 1980–81
- Cheshire Senior Cup
  - Champions 1932–33, 1975–76, 2007–08, 2011–12, 2017–18, 2018–19
  - Finalists 1889–90, 1897–98, 1903–04, 1913–14, 1929–30, 2008–09, 2016–17
- North West Counties Football League Challenge Cup
  - Champions 1994–95
  - Finalists 1992–93
- Mid-Cheshire League
  - Champions 1963–64
  - Runners-up 1950–51, 1961–62, 1964–65
- Mid-Cheshire League Cup
  - Winners 1961–62, 1963–64
  - Finalists 1948–49, 1964–65
- Crewe Amateur Combination
  - Champions 1946–47
- The Combination
  - Runners-Up 1902–03
- Cheshire League Division One
  - Runners-Up 1900–01
- Shropshire & District League
  - Runners-Up 1891–92
- Manchester League
  - Runners-Up 1966–67
- Northern Premier League Division One South
  - Play-Off Winners 2007–08
- Eddie Morris Trophy
  - Winners 2020, 2021, 2023

=== Records ===
- Fee received:
  - £25,000 (Forest Green Rovers for Jon Moran, 2016)
  - £20,000 (Crewe Alexandra for Kelvin Mellor, 2008)
  - £5,000 (+ £5,000) (Crewe Alexandra for Matthew Freeman, 2007)
  - £4,000 (Stafford Rangers for Dougie Dawson, 1995)
- Record league victory:
  - 20–0 v Whitchurch Alexandra, Cheshire League Division 1, 5 April 1901
- Record win margin: 20
  - as above
- Record league defeat:
  - 2–16 v Stalybridge Celtic, 22 October 1932
- Most goals scored in one Season:
  - 60 Bobby Jones, 1946–47
- Record attendance:
  - Kingsley Fields, Nantwich 5,121 v Winsford United, 19 February 1921
  - London Road (Jackson Avenue), Nantwich 4,000 v Crewe Alexandra Reserves, 21 April 1924
  - The Weaver Stadium, Nantwich 2,078 v FC Halifax Town, 12 March 2015 (FA Trophy semi-final 1st leg)
  - League: 1,571 v Chester F.C., 29 August 2011
- FA Cup best:
  - First round 2011–12 – lost 6–0 away to Milton Keynes Dons F.C. on 12 November 2011; attendance 4,110
  - First round 2017–18 – lost 5–0 away to Stevenage F.C. on 4 November 2017; attendance 1,435
  - First round 2019–20 – lost 1–0 to AFC Fylde at Weaver Stadium on 9 November 2019; attendance 1,544

==== All-time top goalscorers ====
Nantwich's all-time top goalscorer is F.W.'Billy' Slight who netted 169 goals for his hometown club from the 1923/24 season. He is followed by John Scarlett with 161 goals, Sean Cooke (122), Jack Foster (117), Danny Griggs (116), Cyrus Johnson and Michael Lennon (106) and Jimmy Cooke (105).
