= Sam Aiston =

English footballer (born 1976)

Personal information
- Full name: Samuel James Aiston
- Date of birth: 21 November 1976 (age 49)
- Place of birth: Newcastle upon Tyne, England
- Height: 6 ft 1 in (1.85 m)
- Position: Midfielder

Youth career
- 1994–1995: Newcastle United

Senior career*
Years	Team	Apps	(Gls)
1995–2000	Sunderland	20	(0)
1997–1999	→ Chester City (loan)	23	(0)
1999	→ Stoke City (loan)	6	(0)
2000	→ Shrewsbury Town (loan)	10	(0)
2000–2005	Shrewsbury Town	167	(7)
2005–2006	Tranmere Rovers	36	(3)
2006–2008	Northampton Town	22	(0)
2007	→ Burton Albion (loan)	5	(0)
2007–2008	→ Wrexham (loan)	8	(0)
2008–2009	Wrexham	30	(0)
2009	Stafford Rangers	18	(0)
2009–2010	Hednesford Town	18	(0)
2010–2011	Gainsborough Trinity	53	(5)
Total		416	(15)
- * Club domestic league appearances and goals

Samuel James Aiston (born 21 November 1976) is an English former professional footballer.

He played as a midfielder and made over 200 appearances in the Premier League and the Football League, particularly for Sunderland, Chester City, Shrewsbury Town, Tranmere Rovers, Northampton Town and Wrexham. He finished his career in Non-League football and turned out for Stafford Rangers, Hednesford Town and Gainsborough Trinity.

== Career ==
Aiston began his career at Newcastle United in 1994 but made no appearances for the club before joining Sunderland in 1995, where he made over 20 first-team appearances, most as substitute. He was loaned to Chester City, Stoke City and Shrewsbury Town, before joining Shrewsbury for a £50,000 transfer fee in the summer of 2000. Aiston made 165 league appearances for Shrewsbury, scoring seven goals, helping the club to promotion from the Football Conference at the end of the 2003–04 season. Whilst at Shrewsbury Town Aiston endeared himself to the Shrewsbury faithful owing to his style of play.

He was released by Shrewsbury at the end of the 2004–05 season and initially agreed a two-year deal with Grimsby Town, with the official website initially announcing the signing. He then did a u-turn and joined Tranmere Rovers in July 2005, where he made over 40 league and cup appearances in the 2005–06 season. He was released by Tranmere at the end of the season, and joined Northampton Town. Injuries meant he struggled to command a regular first team place and he dropped into the Conference National for a loan spell with Burton Albion.

In November 2007, Aiston joined Wrexham on loan, having previously played for Wrexham manager Brian Little at Tranmere Rovers. Aiston made his debut in a 2–2 draw with Chester City three days later. In January 2008, Aiston's move to Wrexham was made into a permanent signing. He was transfer listed by Wrexham in May 2008 following the club's relegation to the Football Conference.

Aiston went on to play for Stafford Rangers and Hednesford Town before joining Gainsborough Trinity in February 2010. He was released in May 2011.

== Personal life ==
After retiring from playing football Aiston became a primary school teacher, working initially at Bicton primary school near Shrewsbury.

He got married in August 2012 to Hollie Adams at St Chad's Church, Shrewsbury. At the time he was teacher at Newdale Primary School in Telford, Shropshire.

In December 2021 Aiston, along with his ex Shrewsbury Town teammates Dave Edwards and Gavin Cowan, launched the podcast, In The Stiffs.

In November 2022, he was head teacher at Broseley C.ofE. Primary School, when he was named to take up his next appointment as first head teacher at Bowbrook Primary School, Shrewsbury, in 2023.

== Career statistics ==
Club	Season	League			FA Cup		League Cup		Other^{[A]}		Total	
Club	Season	Division	Apps	Goals	Apps	Goals	Apps	Goals	Apps	Goals	Apps	Goals
Sunderland	1995–96	First Division	14	0	0	0	1	0	0	0	15	0
Sunderland	1996–97	Premier League	2	0	2	0	0	0	0	0	4	0
Sunderland	1997–98	First Division	3	0	0	0	0	0	0	0	3	0
Sunderland	1998–99	First Division	1	0	0	0	1	0	0	0	2	0
Sunderland	1999–2000	Premier League	0	0	0	0	0	0	0	0	0	0
Sunderland	Total		20	0	2	0	2	0	0	0	24	0
Chester City (loan)	1996–97	Third Division	14	0	0	0	0	0	2	0	16	0
Chester City (loan)	1998–99	Third Division	11	0	0	0	0	0	1	0	12	0
Chester City (loan)	Total		25	0	0	0	0	0	3	0	28	0
Stoke City (loan)	1999–2000	Second Division	6	0	0	0	1	0	0	0	7	0
Shrewsbury Town	1999–2000	Third Division	10	0	0	0	0	0	0	0	10	0
Shrewsbury Town	2000–01	Third Division	42	2	1	0	2	0	0	0	45	2
Shrewsbury Town	2001–02	Third Division	35	2	1	0	0	0	0	0	36	2
Shrewsbury Town	2002–03	Third Division	21	2	1	0	0	0	3	0	25	2
Shrewsbury Town	2003–04	Conference National	34	0	2	0	0	0	1	0	37	0
Shrewsbury Town	2004–05	League Two	35	1	1	0	1	0	1	0	38	1
Shrewsbury Town	Total		177	7	6	0	3	0	5	0	191	7
Tranmere Rovers	2005–06	League One	36	3	1	0	1	0	1	0	39	3
Northampton Town	2006–07	League One	21	0	0	0	1	0	0	0	22	0
Northampton Town	2007–08	League One	1	0	1	0	1	0	0	0	3	0
Northampton Town	Total		22	0	1	0	2	0	0	0	25	0
Burton Albion (loan)	2007–08	Conference National	5	0	0	0	0	0	0	0	5	0
Wrexham	2007–08	League Two	19	0	0	0	0	0	0	0	19	0
Wrexham	2008–09	Conference National	19	0	1	0	0	0	0	0	20	0
Wrexham	Total		38	0	1	0	0	0	0	0	39	0
Career total			329	10	11	0	9	0	9	0	358	10

A. The "Other" column constitutes appearances and goals in the Football League Trophy and Football League play-offs.

== Honours ==
Sunderland

- Football League First Division: 1995–96
