= Trevor Challis =

English footballer

Personal information
- Date of birth: 23 October 1975 (age 51)
- Place of birth: Paddington, England
- Position: Left back

Youth career
- 1985–1992: Larkspur FC, Belmont United FC

Senior career*
Years	Team	Apps	(Gls)
1994–1998	Queens Park Rangers	13	(0)
1998–2003	Bristol Rovers	145	(0)
2003–2004	Telford United	33	(0)
2004–2005	Shrewsbury Town	46	(3)
2005–2008	Weymouth	60	(0)
2008–2010	Eastleigh	35	(0)
- * Club domestic league appearances and goals as of 11 January 2007

Trevor Challis (born 23 October 1975) is an English former professional footballer

He was part of the successful Queens Park Rangers youth team that won the South East Counties League and Southern Junior Floodlit Cup final beating West Ham.

Trevor played in the Premier League for Queens Park Rangers during the 1995–1996 season, playing left back earning a call up for England under 21s in the Toulon tournament, making two appearances against Angola and Portugal. Trevor represented England at under 12,16,18,21 levels as well as Ireland at under 16 level. During the 1996–1997 season, Trevor received a bad knee injury in a heavy challenge with Norwich City footballer Rob Newman. It took Trevor 20 months and five knee operations to regain full fitness, when ex-teammate Ian Holloway invited Trevor to play for Bristol Rovers and rebuild his career. Trevor won all three player of the year awards during the 1998–1999 season.

Trevor scored the winning penalty for Shrewsbury Town when they beat Aldershot Town in the 2004 Conference playoff final. Trevor also helped Weymouth F.C. to the Conference South title in the 2005–2006 season.

In 2010, he started working for Bristol City F.C. and worked as the Academy Recruitment Officer. He is currently under-18s coach.
