= Luke Rodgers =

English footballer (born 1982)

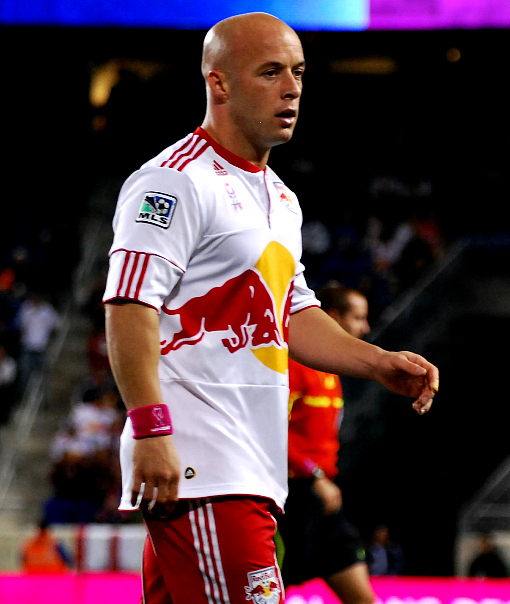
- Rodgers playing for New York Red Bulls in 2011

Personal information
- Full name: Luke John Rodgers
- Date of birth: 1 January 1982 (age 44)
- Place of birth: Birmingham, England
- Height: 5 ft 8 in (1.73 m)
- Position: Striker

Senior career*
Years	Team	Apps	(Gls)
1999–2005	Shrewsbury Town	176	(65)
2005–2007	Crewe Alexandra	38	(9)
2007–2009	Port Vale	59	(16)
2008–2009	→ Yeovil Town (loan)	6	(2)
2009	Yeovil Town	16	(1)
2009–2010	Notts County	46	(13)
2011–2012	New York Red Bulls	23	(9)
2012	Lillestrøm	7	(1)
2012–2013	Portsmouth	10	(2)
2012	→ Shrewsbury Town (loan)	9	(2)
2013	Shrewsbury Town	6	(0)
2013	Hammarby IF	6	(0)
2014	Forest Green Rovers	20	(0)
2015–2016	Sutton Coldfield Town		
2016–2017	Solihull Moors	3	(0)
2017	Hednesford Town	6	(1)
2017–201?	Highgate United		
Total		431	(121)

International career
2003	England C	1	(1)
- * Club domestic league appearances and goals

Luke John Rodgers (born 1 January 1982) is an English former professional footballer who played as a striker.

He played in England's Football League, starting at Shrewsbury Town in 1999. Rodgers spent six years with the Shropshire side and made over 200 appearances as they were relegated and then promoted back to the English Football League. In the summer of 2005, he moved to Crewe Alexandra, where he stayed until a January 2007 switch to Port Vale. Two years later, he moved on to Yeovil Town following a short loan spell. His permanent spell at Yeovil was brief; he soon transferred to Notts County in the summer of 2009, whom he helped fire to promotion in his first season.

He completed a move to Major League Soccer with New York Red Bulls in January 2011. In March 2012, he was released by the Red Bulls after his work visa renewal was denied and transferred to the Norwegian club Lillestrøm. He returned to the English league with Portsmouth in August 2012 before joining Shrewsbury Town on loan two months later in a permanent deal the following January. He signed with the Swedish club Hammarby IF in July 2013 and stayed until the end of the calendar year. He signed with Forest Green Rovers in February 2014 and joined Sutton Coldfield Town the following year. He joined Solihull Moors in December 2016, and then Hednesford Town and Highgate United in 2017.

== Club career ==
=== Shrewsbury Town ===
Rodgers joined Shrewsbury Town at 17. He first established himself as a goal-scorer during the 2000–01 season, as he bagged seven goals in 27 games (half of which were as a substitute). Three of his goals came against Rochdale in a 7–1 romp at Spotland on 24 February. The 2001–02 season showed Rodgers' potential, as he hit 22 goals in 41 games, this time never being used as a substitute.

In 2002–03 he hit twenty goals in 47 games. Rodgers also played in the club's giant-killing over Premier League Everton in the FA Cup, but despite this Shrewsbury suffered relegation out of the English Football League having finished bottom of the Third Division. At the end of the season the club insisted that Rodgers was 'not for sale'; this was proved to be true when First Division Crewe Alexandra had a £200,000 bid for Rodgers rejected by manager Jimmy Quinn. Hull City also had a £200,000 bid of their own rejected, as Quinn persuaded Rodgers to remain in Shropshire. Earlier in the season there was also unconfirmed speculation that Southampton had offered as much as £600,000 for the player.

Despite being limited to 26 league starts in 2003–04, he still bagged 15 goals in his 41 games. He also scored both goals past Barnet in the play-off semi-final aggregate victory that took Shrewsbury into the play-off final with Aldershot Town at the Britannia Stadium. The final itself went to a penalty shoot-out. Though Rodgers missed his penalty, Town won the match as all three Aldershot penalty-takers missed theirs. In 2004–05, his final season with the "Shrews", he managed just eight goals in forty games. However, he had long become a fan favourite at Gay Meadow as he scored 67 goals in 204 appearances for the Shropshire side in all competitions, also managing four club hat-tricks.

=== Crewe Alexandra ===
Rodgers turned down Shrewsbury's offer of a one-year contract, and was initially linked with a move to SPL high-flyers Hibernian. Instead he moved to Championship club Crewe Alexandra on a two-year contract for a tribunal-decided fee in July 2005. Shrewsbury received £100,000 from the tribunal with two add-ons of £20,000 based on appearances; however, due to his brief spell at Crewe, Shrewsbury only received the first of these. Crewe went on to suffer relegation in 2005–06, and though Rodgers was limited to six goals in his 26 games, he was forced to come off the bench in half of these games.

Despite being popular with supporters, he was never a favourite of Dario Gradi, and was third-choice behind free-scoring Luke Varney and Nicky Maynard at the start of the 2006–07 season. Rodgers asked for a transfer to a club that would provide him with regular football, and in January 2007, after just 39 appearances and 9 goals, he moved to local rivals Port Vale for a £30,000 fee. This came after he chose to sign for Vale ahead of Paul Sturrock's Swindon Town, who had also agreed a fee with Crewe; as well as Chester City; and an unnamed League Two club who offered £40,000 for the striker.

=== Port Vale ===
He got injured after just three appearances for the "Valiants" and only played a total of eight games before the end of the season, though he still managed to score three goals. His first goal for the club came against Crewe in a 3–0 win at Vale Park. During the 2007–08 season, Rodgers was the club's top scorer with twelve goals in 41 games, but famously missed two penalties in Vale's defeat to Southern Football League minnows Chasetown in the second round of the FA Cup.

Unhappy on the club's bench, in November 2008 there was talk of Rodgers moving to Yeovil Town, yet the move stalled as the two clubs had difficulties reaching a transfer fee. However, a loan deal was made which would take Rodgers to Yeovil until the January transfer window, when the club would have the option of purchasing him for £30,000 fee, with a 10% sell-on clause (an offer Yeovil boss Russell Slade described as "the final throw of the dice"). Despite all this, when January came he was released from his contract by mutual consent, having had a disagreement with manager Dean Glover. Glover claimed the decision was motivated by a desire to free up the wage bill.

=== Yeovil Town ===
Rejecting an approach from Northampton Town, Rodgers instead signed with Yeovil Town until the end of the season. He left the club at the end of his contract, having scored three goals in 22 games for the League One club.

=== Notts County ===
After leaving Yeovil, Rodgers had planned to remain in League One, but instead signed for Notts County in July 2009 on a two-year deal. Rodgers made a slow start to the season, making eight appearances without scoring, only to break out of the barren spell with a hat-trick past Lincoln City on 29 September. He played in 42 league matches for Notts County, scoring 13 league goals in helping the club to gain promotion out of League Two.

At the end of the season it was reported that Rodgers was set to leave Notts County to join former Magpies' boss Hans Backe at New York Red Bulls, a move his club permitted. However, this move was put in jeopardy after his initial application for a US work permit was turned down. Nevertheless, Backe was confident that Rodgers would join the club in the January 2011 transfer window, and after Rodgers had reached an agreement with Notts County for a mutual termination of his contract at Meadow Lane, the move did go through as predicted.

=== New York Red Bulls ===
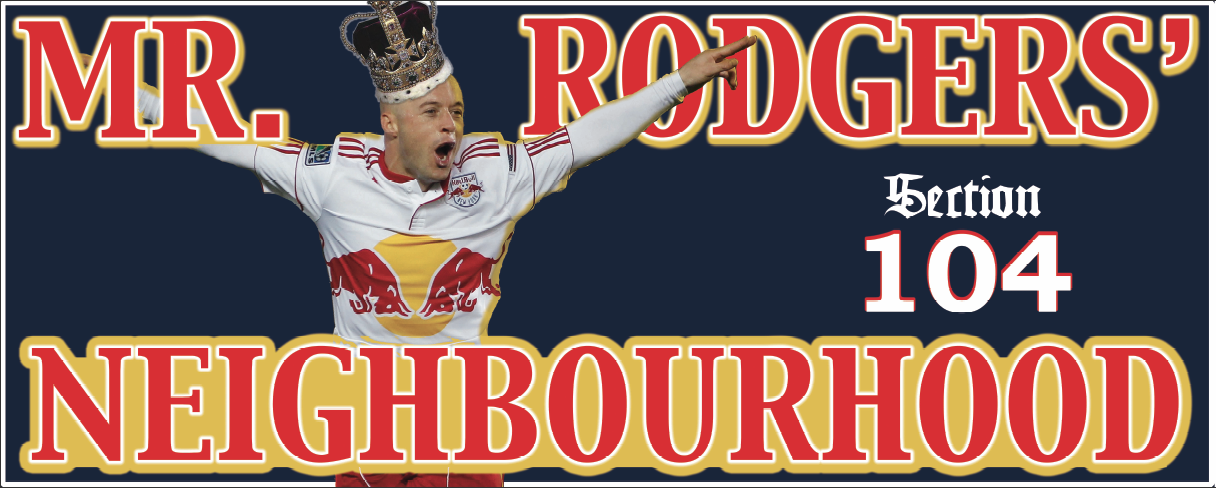
Rodgers depicted on an iconic Red Bull Arena supporter banner.

After a lengthy process, Rodgers eventually signed with Major League Soccer club New York Red Bulls in January 2011. He made his MLS debut two months later, in a goalless draw with the Columbus Crew. The following month, Rodgers scored his first two goals and assisted strike-partner Thierry Henry in a 3–0 win over the San Jose Earthquakes. For this feat he was named as the MLS 'player of the week'. Rodgers told reporters that "this is the happiest I've been in football." He scored nine goals in 23 league games, as head coach Hans Backe tended to select Rodgers ahead of USA international Juan Agudelo as Henry's strike partner. This was despite Rodgers missing two months of the campaign with plantar fasciitis. His "feisty nature" led him to become a fan's favourite at the Red Bull Arena.

=== Lillestrøm ===
On 30 March 2012, the New York Red Bulls had to end their contract with Rodgers as he was unable to secure a visa to play in the United States, and the same day he signed a contract with Norwegian Tippeligaen club Lillestrøm SK lasting till the end of the 2012 season. He scored four minutes into his debut two days later, in a 2–2 draw with Rosenborg at the Åråsen Stadion. However, after failing to cement his place in the first-team, Rodgers and Lillestrøm decided to part ways during the summer break of Tippeligaen.

=== Portsmouth ===
On 16 August 2012, Portsmouth signed Rodgers and nine other players on a one-month contract. Five days later, he scored for the club in a 2–2 draw with Colchester United, and also set up a goal for Jordan Obita. He scored his first goal at Fratton Park on 4 September, in a 2–2 draw with AFC Bournemouth in the Football League Trophy, before converting the winning penalty in the resulting shoot-out. Five days later, Rodgers scored a 25 yards (23 m) free kick in a 3–0 win over Crawley Town. Rodgers suffered an injury on his left thigh at the end of September, ruling him out action for three weeks.

=== Return to Shrewsbury Town ===
On 9 November, he returned to the club where he started his career, Shrewsbury Town, on loan, with the move set to become permanent in the January transfer window. On returning to the New Meadow, Rodgers said that: "People do say 'don't ever go back', but what's the worst that can happen?" After the move was made permanent in January, Rodgers said that he hoped to stay beyond the end of the 2012–13 season. He left the club in March 2013, after scoring just twice in 15 appearances and failing to win a place in the starting line-up in six weeks.

=== Later career ===
He signed with Swedish Superettan club Hammarby IF in July 2013. He was one of Gregg Berhalter's last signings before the American was sacked.

Rodgers signed with Conference National club Forest Green Rovers in February 2014. He made his debut at The New Lawn on 8 March as a late substitute for Lee Hughes in a 3–2 win over Cambridge United. He scored his first competitive goal for Rovers in an FA Cup Fourth Qualifying Round tie 4–1 win over Gloucester City on 25 October 2014. On 1 December 2014, it was confirmed that he had agreed to part ways with Forest Green by mutual consent.

He played for Sutton Coldfield Town of the Northern Premier League Premier Division in the 2015–16 season. He signed with National League side Solihull Moors in December 2016. He joined Northern Premier League Premier Division club Hednesford Town in June 2017. He scored one goal in six games for the "Pitmen", picking up one man of the match award.

In September 2017, Rodgers moved to Highgate United of the Midland League Premier Division, making his debut on 30 September in a 3–1 victory over Coventry Sphinx.

== International career ==
On 4 November 2003, whilst with Shrewsbury Town in the Conference National, Rodgers won one cap for England under Paul Fairclough at semi-professional level. A 2–2 draw with Belgium under-20s, Rodgers provided an assist for Sam Ricketts before grabbing a goal himself with a 25 yards (23 m) free kick two minutes before the final whistle.

== Style of play ==
Rodgers was a striker who liked to lie alongside the last defender, which led to him being frequently ruled offside when he timed his run wrong.

== Personal and later life ==
In April 2003, Rodgers was ordered to carry out 100 hours of community service and pay £5,000 in compensation by Warwick Crown Court after a firework set by Rodgers misfired and hit a 16-year-old girl, causing significant damage to the girl's face. Rodgers stated, "It was a complete accident... I am glad it's all over, although it's never been about the sentencing, I was more concerned about the girl." Rodgers was given an 'adult caution for a public order offence' by the Somerset Police Force, after an incident in April 2009. On 1 October 2009, Rodgers was arrested and bailed in connection with a disturbance in Nottingham city centre, following a drinking session with his Notts County teammates.

After retiring as a player, Rodgers worked as a football consultant, representing the Sports Management International agency firm in Birmingham and the Midlands.

== Career statistics ==
Appearances and goals by club, season and competition
Club	Season	League			National cup (Note: Includes FA Cup, U.S. Open Cup, Norwegian Cup, Svenska Cupen)		League cup (Note: Includes Football League Cup)		Other		Total	
Club	Season	Division	Apps	Goals	Apps	Goals	Apps	Goals	Apps	Goals	Apps	Goals
Shrewsbury Town	1999–2000	Third Division	6	1	1	0	0	0	1 (Note: Appearance(s) in the Football League Trophy.)	0	8	1
Shrewsbury Town	2000–01	Third Division	26	7	0	0	0	0	1	0	27	7
Shrewsbury Town	2001–02	Third Division	38	22	1	0	1	0	1	0	41	22
Shrewsbury Town	2002–03	Third Division	36	16	4	0	1	0	6	4	47	20
Shrewsbury Town	2003–04	Conference	34	13	2	0	—		5 (Note: 2 appearance in the FA Trophy, 3 appearances and 1 goal in the play-offs.)	2	41	15
Shrewsbury Town	2004–05	League Two	36	6	1	0	1	1	2	1	40	8
Shrewsbury Town	Total		176	65	9	0	3	1	16	7	204	73
Crewe Alexandra	2005–06	Championship	26	6	0	0	0	0	—		26	6
Crewe Alexandra	2006–07	League One	12	3	1	0	0	0	0	0	13	3
Crewe Alexandra	Total		38	9	1	0	0	0	0	0	39	9
Port Vale	2006–07	League One	8	3	—		—		—		8	3
Port Vale	2007–08	League One	36	9	3	1	1	1	1	1	41	12
Port Vale	2008–09	League Two	15	4	0	0	1	1	1	0	17	5
Port Vale	Total		59	16	3	1	2	2	2	1	66	20
Yeovil Town	2008–09	League One	22	3	0	0	0	0	0	0	22	3
Notts County	2009–10	League Two	42	13	6	1	1	0	0	0	49	14
Notts County	2010–11	League One	4	0	1	1	0	0	0	0	5	1
Notts County	Total		46	13	7	2	1	0	0	0	54	15
New York Red Bulls	2011	Major League Soccer	23	9	0	0	2	1	0	0	25	10
Lillestrøm SK	2012	Tippeligaen	7	1	0	0	—		0	0	7	1
Portsmouth	2012–13	League One	10	2	1	0	0	0	2	1	13	3
Shrewsbury Town	2012–13	League One	15	2	—		—		—		15	2
Hammarby IF	2013	Superettan	6	0	0	0	—		0	0	6	0
Forest Green Rovers	2013–14	Conference National	10	0	—		—		—		10	0
Forest Green Rovers	2014–15	Conference National	10	0	1	1	—		0	0	11	1
Forest Green Rovers	Total		20	0	1	1	0	0	0	0	21	1
Solihull Moors	2016–17	National League	3	0	0	0	—		2 (Note: Appearance(s) in the FA Trophy)	1	5	1
Hednesford Town	2017–18	Northern Premier League; Premier Division	6	1	0	0	—		0	0	6	1
Career total (Note: Statistics for Sutton Coldfield Town and Highgate United not recorded.)			431	121	22	4	8	4	22	10	483	139

== Honours ==
Shrewsbury Town

- Conference National play-offs: 2004

Notts County

- Football League Two: 2009–10
