= Darren Moss =

Welsh footballer

Personal information
- Date of birth: 24 May 1981 (age 45)
- Place of birth: Wrexham, Wales
- Position: Defender

Youth career
- 1997–1998: Chester City

Senior career*
Years	Team	Apps	(Gls)
1998–2001	Chester City	62	(0)
2001–2005	Shrewsbury Town	135	(10)
2005–2007	Crewe Alexandra	59	(2)
2007–2009	Shrewsbury Town	60	(2)
2009–2010	Morecambe	18	(1)
2011	Bangor City	33	(9)
2011–2013	Nantwich Town	48	(6)
2013–2014	Conwy Borough		
2016	Cefn Druids	1	(0)

International career
2001–2002	Wales U21	6	(0)

Managerial career
- 2013: Nantwich Town (player-manager)
- 2013–2014: Conwy Borough (player-manager)
- 2018: Holywell Town (assistant)
- 2022–: Cefn Druids (first team manager)
- * Club domestic league appearances and goals

Darren Moss (born 24 May 1981) is a Welsh football coach and former player.

== Playing career ==
Moss started his career as a trainee at Chester. He made his début for the club back in November 1998, in Chester's 2–1 loss against Brentford. During Moss's Chester career he played in 62 games for the club, in those games he received nine yellow cards and two red cards.

In June 2001, Moss joined Shrewsbury Town on a free transfer, making his début in August 2001 in Town's 3–1 loss against Hartlepool United. Moss was one of Shrewsbury's few key players as the club endured a poor 2002–03 campaign which saw them relegated from the Football League. Moss continued his good form in the Football Conference during 2003–04 as Shrewsbury immediately won promotion back to the Football League. A notable moment for Moss was scoring the winning penalty in the Conference playoff semi-final against Barnet, a game that eventually was settled by penalties. Seen as one of the key members of the squad, Moss was becoming a target of transfer interest from other clubs.

In March 2005, Darren Moss joined Dario Gradi's Crewe Alexandra, the north-west based club buying him for £170,000. He made his début in Crewe's 4–1 defeat to Wolverhampton Wanderers. A combination of injuries and the signing of Jon Otsemobor from Rotherham United in the January transfer window left Moss without a place in the first team. This was until Otsemobor rejected a new contract at Crewe, which put him on the transfer list, with Gradi looking for a replacement for the speedy full-back. The Crewe manager turned to Moss who made his first appearance as Otsemobor's replacement in the 4–2 win over Chesterfield in the EFL Trophy.

Towards the end of the 2006–07 season, rumours linked Moss with a move back to his former club Shrewsbury Town. These rumours were fuelled further when Moss turned down an extension to his contract at Crewe. In May 2007, only days after Shrewsbury narrowly missed out on promotion, Moss re-joined Shrewsbury Town on a free transfer. Moss made 31 league appearances in 2007–08, scoring twice. Both goals came in local derbies, against his former club Chester and Wrexham.

On 29 June 2009, he signed a two-year deal with Morecambe after being heavily linked with them, but struggled to hold down a regular first team place and left by mutual consent in October 2010.

In January 2011, Moss' career took a new turn as he signed for Welsh Premier League club Bangor City. He made eight appearances for the club before leaving in the summer. He went on to sign for Nantwich Town.

== Coaching, scouting and management career ==
In March 2013 he was appointed as caretaker player-manager for Nantwich Town whilst working for his UEFA B coaching licence.

In June 2013 he joined Conwy Borough as player-coach. In December he was appointed as player-manager until the end of the season, alongside Aden Shannon, guiding the club to a second-place finish in the Cymru Alliance. He left the club in November 2014 after a disappointing start to the 2014–15 season.

In June 2018 he joined Holywell Town as assistant manager but he left the club within a few months.

In 2020 he was appointed as a scout for Plymouth Argyle having previously scouted for four years for Stoke City for the 16-23 age group.
