= Jamie Tolley =

English-Welsh footballer

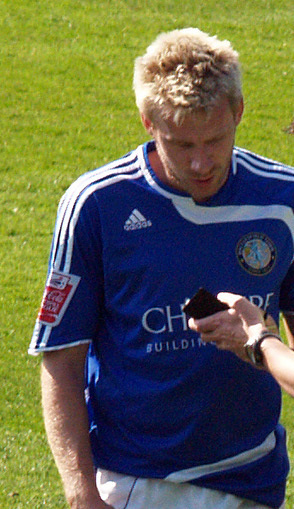
- Tolley with Macclesfield Town in 2009

Personal information
- Full name: Jamie Christopher Tolley
- Date of birth: 12 May 1983 (age 43)
- Place of birth: Ludlow, England
- Height: 6 ft 1 in (1.85 m)
- Position: Midfielder

Senior career*
Years	Team	Apps	(Gls)
1999–2006	Shrewsbury Town	181	(17)
2006–2009	Macclesfield Town	63	(3)
2009–2010	Hereford United	10	(0)
2010–2012	Wrexham	58	(9)
2012–2013	Mansfield Town	2	(0)
2013	Kidderminster Harriers	1	(0)
2014	Colwyn Bay	16	(0)
2016	Newtown	12	(0)

International career^{‡}
2001–2005	Wales U21	12	(1)
- * Club domestic league appearances and goals as of 10:13, 24 April 2016 (UTC) ‡ National team caps and goals as of 13:00, 24 July 2012 (UTC)

Jamie Christopher Tolley (born 12 May 1983) is a footballer. Until October 2005 he was a regular in the Wales under-21 team, having made his first appearance aged 18. He is the cousin of former Shrewsbury Town midfielder Glenn Tolley.

== Early life ==
As a teenager, Tolley attended Ludlow Church of England School.

== Career ==
Tolley began his career as a trainee with Shrewsbury Town, and made his début for the club on 20 November 1999 in a 2–2 draw with Oxford United. Aged just 16 years 193 days, he became the youngest player in Shrewsbury's history.

By the end of the 2005–06 season Tolley had allowed his contract to expire. After failing to receive the interest he had hoped for, Tolley eventually joined Macclesfield Town, a week into the 2006–07 season. Although he was out-of-contract, as he was under 24 and spent his development years at Shrewsbury, a transfer fee had to be paid. This was revealed to be a five-figure sum that did not meet Shrewsbury's valuation, but Tolley was allowed to leave in the best interests of both the club and the player, according to manager Gary Peters.

Tolley made his Macclesfield debut in their 2–1 defeat at home to Milton Keynes Dons on 12 August 2006, having signed for the club two days earlier.

At the end of the 2007–08 season, Tolley rejected the offer of a new contract with the Silkmen. He trialled with Luton Town, but returned to Macclesfield later that summer, signing a six-month contract. Tolley was offered an additional 6-month contract in January 2009 to help the Silkmen cover the sale of Terry Dunfield. However, further injuries and ineffective performances in the period resulted in Tolley being released by manager Keith Alexander at the end of the 2008–09 season.

At the start of the 2009–10 season Tolley signed a years contract at League Two side Hereford United, however a disappointing season which only saw 10 appearances ended with his contract termination by mutual consent in March 2010.

In July 2010, Tolley joined Conference side Wrexham on trial, featuring in several pre-season friendlies before signing a short-term deal with the club in an attempt to prove his fitness to manager Dean Saunders. He made his debut for the club on the opening day of the 2010–11 season as a substitute in place of David Brown during a 1–0 win over Cambridge United.

He stayed at Wrexham for 2 seasons before turning down a new contract to stay with the dragons and signing for divisional rivals Mansfield Town during the summer of 2012.

After an unsuccessful year at the Stags, he was released having made only 2 first team appearances, but soon linked up with Kidderminster Harriers on a one-year deal. His contract with Harriers was cancelled midway through the season and he left the club after only 4 minutes of first team action, joining up with Frank Sinclair, a former Wrexham teammate, at Colwyn Bay.

Tolley joined Welsh Premier League side Newtown in January 2016. He made his debut against Aberystwyth on Saturday 16 January 2016.

== Career statistics ==
Appearances and goals by club, season and competition
Club	Season	League			FA Cup		League Cup		Other		Total	
Club	Season	Division	Apps	Goals	Apps	Goals	Apps	Goals	Apps	Goals	Apps	Goals
Shrewsbury Town	1999–2000	Third Division	2	0	2	0	0	0	0	0	4	0
Shrewsbury Town	2000–01	Third Division	24	2	0	0	1	0	1 (Note: Appearance(s) in Football League Trophy)	0	26	02
Shrewsbury Town	2001–02	Third Division	23	1	1	0	0	0	0	0	24	1
Shrewsbury Town	2002–03	Third Division	33	3	3	1	1	0	4	0	41	4
Shrewsbury Town	2003–04	Football Conference	27	3	2	0	—		5 (Note: 1 appearance in FA Trophy, 1 appearance in Football League Trophy, 3 appearances in Football Conference play-offs)	0	34	3
Shrewsbury Town	2004–05	League Two	36	4	0	0	1	0	2	1	39	5
Shrewsbury Town	2005–06	League Two	36	4	2	1	2	0	1	0	41	5
Shrewsbury Town	Total		181	17	10	2	5	0	13	1	209	20
Macclesfield Town	2006–07	League Two	23	1	4	0	1	0	1	0	29	1
Macclesfield Town	2007–08	League Two	24	2	1	0	0	0	0	0	25	2
Macclesfield Town	2008–09	League Two	16	0	0	0	2	0	0	0	18	0
Macclesfield Town	Total		63	3	5	0	3	0	1	0	72	3
Hereford United	2009–10	League Two	10	0	0	0	1	0	2	0	13	0
Wrexham	2010–11	Football Conference	24	4	0	0	—		2 (Note: Appearance(s) in Football Conference play-offs)	0	26	4
Wrexham	2011–12	Football Conference	34	5	5	1	—		2	0	41	6
Wrexham	Total		58	9	5	1	0	0	4	0	67	10
Mansfield Town	2012–13	Football Conference	2	0	0	0	—		0	0	2	0
Kidderminster Harriers	2013–14	Football Conference	1	0	0	0	—		0	0	1	0
Career total			58	9	5	1	0	0	4	0	67	10
