= Kevin Street =

English footballer and manager

Personal information
- Date of birth: 25 November 1977 (age 48)
- Place of birth: Crewe, England
- Position: Midfielder

Senior career*
Years	Team	Apps	(Gls)
1997–2002	Crewe Alexandra	115	(9)
2001	→ Luton Town (loan)	2	(0)
2002	Northwich Victoria	13	(6)
2002–2003	Bristol Rovers	33	(2)
2003–2005	Shrewsbury Town	49	(3)
2005–2008	Stafford Rangers	52	(3)
2008–2009	Altrincham	5	(0)
2009–2011	Nantwich Town		
2011–2012	Stafford Rangers		
2012–2014	Kidsgrove Athletic		
2014–2016	Alsager Town		
2017– 2024	Whitchurch Alport		

Managerial career
- 2008: Stafford Rangers (joint caretaker manager)
- 2010–2011: Nantwich Town (joint manager)
- * Club domestic league appearances and goals

Kevin Street (born 25 November 1977) is an English former footballer who played in the Football League as a midfielder for Crewe Alexandra, Luton Town, Bristol Rovers and Shrewsbury Town. He is currently a first team coach for Alsager Town.

== Playing career ==
Street, a strong passing spirit, began his career at Crewe Alexandra in 1997. After a loan move to Luton Town in 2001, he then joined Northwich Victoria in 2002 on a permanent deal before transfers to Bristol Rovers 2002–2003, Shrewsbury Town 2003–2005, Stafford Rangers 2005–2008, Altrincham 2008–2009, and Nantwich Town 2009–2011. In June 2011 he returned to Stafford Rangers in an attempt to gain a deal for the 2011–12 season and on 11 July signed a deal with the club. In late September during the 2012–2013 season he left the club by mutual consent. He later signed for Kidsgrove Athletic. In July 2014 he joined Alsager Town where he played for two seasons. Street's final team led him to Whitchurch Alport F.C. where he made his final appearance of his career in 2024 at the age of 46.

== Managerial career ==
Street's first experience of management came in 2008 in a spell as joint caretaker manager with Neil Grayson at Stafford Rangers. In 2010, he became joint manager of Nantwich Town with Darren Tinson although they both left the club by mutual consent in March 2011. During his playing time at Whitchurch, Street also took on the role of player coach until his playing retirement in 2024. He is now a first team coach for Alsager Town where he previously played between 2014 and 2016.
