= David Ridler =

English footballer and manager

Personal information
- Date of birth: 12 March 1976 (age 50)
- Place of birth: Liverpool, England
- Position: Defender

Senior career*
Years	Team	Apps	(Gls)
1995–2001	Wrexham	116	(1)
2001–2003	Macclesfield Town	56	(0)
2003	Scarborough	6	(0)
2003–2005	Shrewsbury Town	48	(2)
2005–20??	Leigh RMI		
2007	Prescot Cables		
2007–2008	Winsford United		
2008–2009	Caernarfon Town	9	(1)
- * Club domestic league appearances and goals

David Ridler (born 12 March 1976) is an English footballer and manager.

He began his career with Wrexham, turning professional in August 1995. In May 2001, after over 100 football league appearances, he was released and joined Macclesfield Town. In March 2003 he joined Scarborough, but left in July that year to join Shrewsbury Town. In May 2004 he was part of the Conference play-off winning side that took Shrewsbury back into the Football League.

He lost his place in the Shrewsbury side and was made available for loan in September 2004.

In March 2005 he left Shrewsbury to join Conference National side Leigh RMI.

He began the 2007–08 season with Prescot Cables, but left in October 2007 to join Winsford United.

He left Winsford to join Caernarfon Town in September 2008.

On 21 May 2009 Ridler was appointed assistant manager of Prescot Cables. He became caretaker manager when boss Joe Gibliru left in November 2010 and was chosen as full-time boss a month later. He left the club to coach overseas in late 2011.

Ridler is working with Liverpool F.C. at their academy in Egypt.
