= Jake Sedgemore =

English footballer

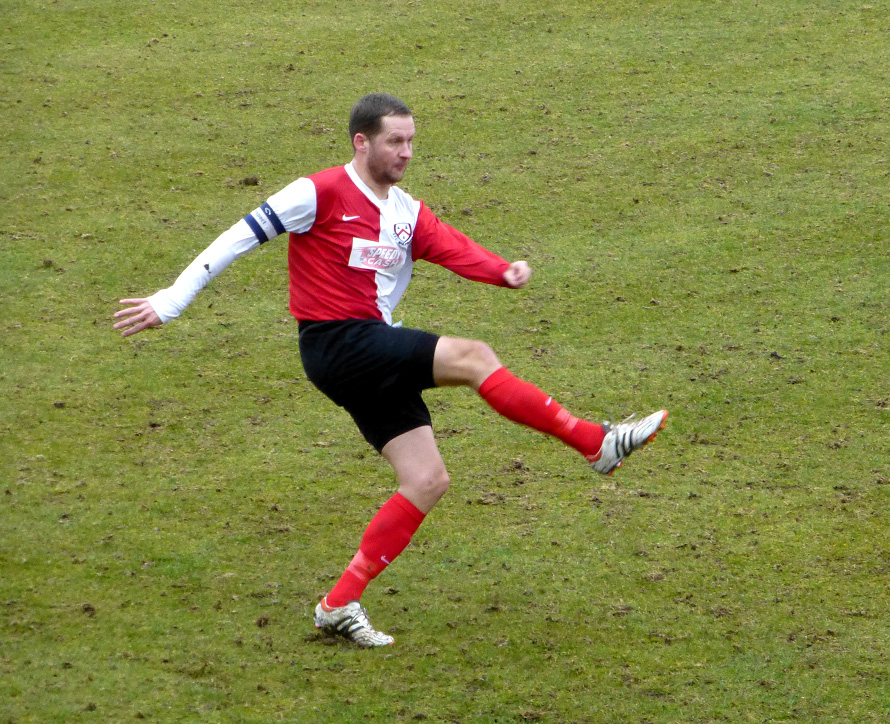

Personal information
- Full name: Jacob Oliver Sedgemore
- Date of birth: 10 October 1978 (age 48)
- Place of birth: Wolverhampton, England
- Position: Midfielder

Team information
- Current team: A.F.C. Wulfrunians

Senior career*
Years	Team	Apps	(Gls)
1997–1998	West Bromwich Albion	0	(0)
1997	→ Hednesford Town (loan)	1	(0)
1998–2001	Hednesford Town	35	(4)
2001	Hereford United	2	(0)
2001–2003	Northwich Victoria	58	(0)
2003–2005	Shrewsbury Town	66	(7)
2005–2006	Bury	9	(0)
2005–2006	→ Burton Albion (loan)	9	(0)
2006–2007	Kidderminster Harriers	41	(0)
2007–2008	Altrincham	31	(3)
2008–2010	Solihull Moors		
2010–2011	Nantwich Town		
2011	Chasetown	9	(2)
2011–	A.F.C. Wulfrunians	176	(48)

International career^{‡}
2004	England C	5	(0)
- * Club domestic league appearances and goals as of 20:43, 2 May 2016 (UTC) ‡ National team caps and goals as of 17:00, 8 July 2011 (UTC)

Jacob Oliver "Jake" Sedgemore (born 20 October 1978 in Wolverhampton) is an English footballer who plays for AFC Wulfrunians. He previously played in the Football League for Shrewsbury Town and Bury. His brother Ben was also a professional footballer.

== Football career ==
Sedgemore began his footballing career at home in the Midlands with West Bromwich Albion, whom he joined as a trainee in August 1997. In December of that year, he spent a short loan spell with non-league side Hednesford Town. After impressing, the deal was made permanent in October 1998.

Renowned for his footballing versatility, he actually spent part of his career with the club playing as a goalkeeper, a far cry from his preferred and arguably specialized position of midfield. He spent just under three years with Hednesford, making around 40 appearances before leaving at the end of the 2000–01 season when they were relegated. He signed briefly for Hereford United making only two appearances in a defensive role, before moving on to join Northwich Victoria early in the season.

He played more than 60 matches at Victoria, before joining Shrewsbury Town in July 2003, and was part of the team that won promotion from the Conference back to the Football League in the 2003–04 season. After making 70 appearances for the Shropshire club, he was released in the summer of 2005. Despite interest from a number of clubs, he opted to join Bury, where he spent a rather unsuccessful six months.

On the flipside, during that time Sedgemore was loaned out to Football Conference club Burton Albion, and whilst there he played a full part in both of the club's memorable FA Cup matches against Manchester United in January 2006.

After sealing his release from Bury later that month, Sedgemore opted against a one-year contract with Burton Albion in favour of a two-year deal with Kidderminster Harriers.

He made his debut for them in early February 2006 against Halifax Town, but failed to sustain a regular first team place and left at the end of the 2006–07 season.

Sedgemore signed for Conference side Altrincham at the start of July 2007. However it was a season of disappointment for him and he was released at the end of the season. He then joined Conference North club Solihull Moors, before switching to Nantwich Town in 2009.

In 2011, Sedgemore signed for Chasetown, before a move to AFC Wulfrunians, where he captained the club to their second West Midlands Regional League Premier Division title in 2013.

Sedgemore's brother, Ben, played football for several clubs including King's Lynn. Despite both the pair being professional footballers for a number of years, injuries and suspensions always prevented the two from playing against one another.
