= Darren Tinson =

Welsh footballer

Personal information
- Date of birth: 15 November 1969 (age 56)
- Place of birth: Connah's Quay, Wales
- Height: 6 ft 0 in (1.83 m)
- Position: Defender

Senior career*
Years	Team	Apps	(Gls)
1990–1993	Colwyn Bay	85	(7)
1993–1996	Northwich	97	(3)
1996–2003	Macclesfield Town	314	(4)
2003–2005	Shrewsbury Town	82	(1)
2005–2007	Burton Albion	76	(0)
2007–2008	Altrincham	45	(2)
2008–2011	Nantwich Town	49	(1)
2011–2012	Leek Town		

Managerial career
- 2010–2011: Nantwich Town (player-manager)
- * Club domestic league appearances and goals as of 19:30, 24 December 2008 (UTC)

Darren Tinson (born 15 November 1969) is a former professional footballer. The defender has played for Colwyn Bay, Northwich Victoria, Macclesfield Town, Shrewsbury Town, Burton Albion, Altrincham and Leek Town over his career.

Tinson left Northwich to join Macclesfield Town for £10,000 in February 1996. He was part of the Macclesfield Town side which gained promotion to the Football League and then moved on a free transfer to Shrewsbury Town where he again won promotion to the League before joining Burton Albion from 1 August 2005. After two seasons at Burton Albion, he joined Altrincham in May 2007. Tinson was captain of Altrincham for the 2007–08 season, making 51 appearances in all.

Tinson had been expected to continue playing for Altrincham in the 2008–09 season. However, he elected to join fellow ex-Northwich defender Steve Davis's team Nantwich Town in the Northern Premier League. He was appointed joint manager of the club in 2010. On 10 March 2011 it was announced that along with joint manager Kevin Street he was leaving by mutual consent.

He later joined Leek Town He studied at the University of Salford for a degree in Physiotherapy.
