= 2000–01 Rotherham United F.C. season =

Rotherham United
2000–01 season
- Football League Second Division: 2nd
- FA Cup: Third round
- League Cup: First round
- League Trophy: First round
Home colours

The 2000–01 season saw Rotherham United compete in the Football League Second Division where they finished in 2nd position with 91 points and gained promotion to the Football League First Division.

== Final league table ==
Pos	Team	Pld	W	D	L	GF	GA	GD	Pts	Qualification or relegation
1	Millwall (C, P)	46	28	9	9	89	38	+51	93	Promotion to Football League First Division
2	Rotherham United (P)	46	27	10	9	79	55	+24	91	Promotion to Football League First Division
3	Reading	46	25	11	10	86	52	+34	86	Qualification for the Second Division play-offs
4	Walsall (O, P)	46	23	12	11	79	50	+29	81	Qualification for the Second Division play-offs
5	Stoke City	46	21	14	11	74	49	+25	77	Qualification for the Second Division play-offs

Rules for classification: 1) Points; 2) Goal difference; 3) Goals scored
(C) Champions; (O) Play-off winners; (P) Promoted

== Results ==
Rotherham United's score comes first

=== Legend ===
Win	Draw	Loss

=== Football League First Division ===
Match	Date	Opponent	Venue	Result	Attendance	Scorers
1	12 August 2000	Walsall	H	2–3	5,200	Robins (2)
2	18 August 2000	Colchester United	A	1–0	3,807	Robins
3	26 August 2000	Bury	H	1–2	3,739	Scott
4	28 August 2000	Bristol City	A	1–0	8,280	Fortune-West
5	2 September 2000	Luton Town	H	1–1	4,061	Robins
6	9 September 2000	Cambridge United	A	1–6	3,925	Robins
7	12 September 2000	Wrexham	A	3–1	2,126	Warne (2), Scott
8	16 September 2000	Wycombe Wanderers	H	1–0	3,545	Branston
9	23 September 2000	Stoke City	A	1–1	13,372	Artell
10	30 September 2000	Reading	H	1–3	4,288	Robins
11	8 October 2000	Oldham Athletic	H	3–0	3,774	Warne, Artell, Talbot
12	14 October 2000	Bournemouth	A	1–0	3,378	Watson
13	17 October 2000	Bristol Rovers	A	1–1	6,910	Watson
14	21 October 2000	Oxford United	H	3–1	3,983	Watson, Warne (2)
15	24 October 2000	Swansea City	H	4–2	3,892	Watson, Robins, Robins, Lee
16	28 October 2000	Northampton Town	A	1–0	6,478	Talbot
17	4 November 2000	Wigan Athletic	H	1–1	6,192	Robins
18	11 November 2000	Brentford	A	3–0	4,544	Talbot (2), Lee
19	25 November 2000	Peterborough United	H	3–0	5,519	Branston, Robins, Hurst
20	2 December 2000	Millwall	H	3–2	7,155	Artell, Lee (2)
21	16 December 2000	Swindon Town	A	1–2	4,752	Branston
22	22 December 2000	Port Vale	A	2–0	4,110	Robins, Hurst
23	26 December 2000	Notts County	H	0–0	7,673	
24	1 January 2001	Bury	A	0–0	3,743	
25	13 January 2001	Bristol City	H	1–1	5,654	Robins
26	20 January 2001	Notts County	A	1–4	7,010	Branston
27	23 January 2001	Walsall	A	1–1	4,437	Sedgwick
28	27 January 2001	Port Vale	H	3–2	5,044	Robins, Lee, Warne
29	10 February 2001	Cambridge United	H	3–0	4,497	Lee (3)
30	20 February 2001	Wrexham	H	2–0	4,528	Lee, Wilsterman
31	24 February 2001	Stoke City	H	2–1	8,211	Robins (2)
32	27 February 2001	Colchester United	H	3–2	5,864	Robins, Hurst, Artell
33	3 March 2001	Reading	A	0–2	13,103	
34	6 March 2001	Bournemouth	H	3–1	6,488	Robins (2), Lee
35	10 March 2001	Oldham Athletic	A	3–2	5,993	Robins, Branston, Garnett (o.g.)
36	17 March 2001	Bristol Rovers	H	3–0	7,098	Barker, Minton (2)
37	20 March 2001	Wycombe Wanderers	A	1–0	5,254	Lee
38	24 March 2001	Oxford United	A	3–4	4,493	Robins, Branston, Lee
39	31 March 2001	Swindon Town	H	4–3	7,106	Robins (3), Reeves (o.g.)
40	7 April 2001	Millwall	A	0–4	16,015	
41	14 April 2001	Swansea City	A	0–0	4,327	
42	16 April 2001	Northampton Town	H	1–0	6,714	Robins
43	21 April 2001	Wigan Athletic	A	2–0	8,836	Robins, Watson
44	24 April 2001	Luton Town	A	1–0	4,854	Sedgwick
45	28 April 2001	Brentford	H	2–1	9,760	Talbot, Lee
46	5 May 2001	Peterborough United	A	1–1	11,274	Warne

=== FA Cup ===
Round	Date	Opponent	Venue	Result	Attendance	Scorers
First round	18 November 2000	Wrexham	A	1–0	3,887	Lee
Second round	9 December 2000	Northampton Town	H	1–0	4,964	Hughes (o.g.)
Third round	6 January 2001	Liverpool	A	0–3	30,689	

=== Football League Cup ===
Round	Date	Opponent	Venue	Result	Attendance	Scorers
First round first leg	22 August 2000	Barnsley	H	0–1	4,940	
First round second leg	5 September 2000	Barnsley	A	2–3	8,080	Robins, Watson

=== Football League Trophy ===
Round	Date	Opponent	Venue	Result	Attendance	Scorers
First round	5 December 2000	Chesterfield	H	3–4	3,488	Robins, Lee, Monkhouse

== Squad statistics ==
No.	Pos.	Name	League		FA Cup		League Cup		Other		Total	
No.	Pos.	Name	Apps	Goals	Apps	Goals	Apps	Goals	Apps	Goals	Apps	Goals
1	GK	(England) Ian Gray	33	0	3	0	2	0	1	0	39	0
2	DF	(England) Chris Beech	8(7)	0	0(1)	0	1	0	0	0	9(8)	0
3	DF	(England) David Artell	35(1)	4	3	0	0	0	1	0	39(1)	4
4	DF	(England) Rob Scott	39	2	2	0	2	0	1	0	44	2
5	MF	(England) Darren Garner	30(1)	1	3	0	1(1)	0	1	0	35(2)	1
6	MF	(England) Marvin Bryan	23(5)	0	1	0	2	0	1	0	27(5)	0
7	FW	(England) Mark Robins	42	24	3	0	2	1	1	1	48	26
8	DF	(Republic of Ireland) Paul Dillon	0	0	0	0	0	0	0	0	0	0
9	FW	(Republic of Ireland) Alan Lee	29(2)	13	3	1	0	0	1	1	33(2)	15
9	FW	(England) Leo Fortune-West	5	1	0	0	2	0	0	0	7	1
10	FW	(England) Paul Warne	44	7	3	0	2	0	1	0	50	7
11	MF	(England) Andy Turner	3(1)	0	0	0	0	0	0	0	3(1)	0
12	MF	(England) Stewart Talbot	37(1)	5	3	0	2	0	0	0	42(1)	5
13	GK	(England) Paul Pettinger	13	0	0	0	0	0	0	0	13	0
14	MF	(England) Kevin Watson	46	5	3	0	2	1	1	0	52	6
15	DF	(England) Alan Knill	0	0	0	0	0	0	0	0	0	0
16	DF	(England) Paul Hurst	42(2)	3	3	0	1(1)	0	1	0	47(3)	3
17	DF	(England) Will Varty	5(1)	0	0	0	0(2)	0	0	0	5(3)	0
19	DF	(Netherlands) Brian Wilsterman	9(1)	1	0	0	1	0	0	0	10(1)	1
20	FW	(England) Andy Monkhouse	1(11)	0	0(2)	0	0	0	0(1)	1	1(14)	1
21	MF	(England) Danny Hudson	1(4)	0	0	0	0	0	0	0	1(4)	0
22	MF	(England) Jeff Minton	5(4)	2	0	0	0	0	0	0	5(4)	2
22	DF	(England) Darren Carr	1	0	0	0	0	0	1	0	2	0
23	MF	(England) Trevor Berry	5(6)	0	0(1)	0	0(1)	0	0(1)	0	5(9)	0
24	MF	(England) Chris Sedgwick	2(19)	2	0(1)	0	0	0	0	0	2(20)	2
27	DF	(England) Shaun Barker	0	0	0	0	0	0	0	0	0	0
28	DF	(England) Guy Branston	41	6	3	0	2	0	0	0	46	6
29	FW	(England) Richie Barker	7(12)	1	0	0	0	0	0	0	7(12)	1
30	FW	(France) Stéphane Lemarchand	0	0	0(1)	0	0	0	0	0	0(1)	0
31	FW	(France) Cedric Bolima	0(1)	0	0	0	0	0	0	0	0(1)	0
