= 2001–02 Rotherham United F.C. season =

Rotherham United
2001–02 season
- Chairman: Ken Booth
- Manager: Ronnie Moore
- Stadium: Millmoor
- First Division: 21st
- FA Cup: Fourth round
- Worthington Cup: Second round
- Top goalscorer: League: Robins (15); All: Robins (16)
- Highest home attendance: 11,426 vs Manchester City (23 Mar 2002, First Division)
- Lowest home attendance: 3,539 vs Bradford City (11 Sep 2001, League Cup)
- Average home league attendance: 7,455

During the 2001–02 English football season, Rotherham United F.C. competed in the Football League First Division.

== Season summary ==
In Rotherham's first season in the second tier of English football since 1983, it was a huge struggle for manager Ronnie Moore as the team started the season poorly by failing to win any of their opening 10 league games which saw them bottom with only four points and seemed destined for a return to the Second Division but from the start of October went on a decent run by picking up 15 points from the next eight league games which saw them climb out of the relegation zone and kept themselves away from the drop for rest of the season despite failing to win any of their final 10 league matches.

== Final league table ==
Pos	Team	Pld	W	D	L	GF	GA	GD	Pts	Qualification or relegation
19	Grimsby Town	46	12	14	20	50	72	−22	50	
20	Sheffield Wednesday	46	12	14	20	49	71	−22	50	
21	Rotherham United	46	10	19	17	52	66	−14	49	
22	Crewe Alexandra (R)	46	12	13	21	47	76	−29	49	Relegation to the Second Division
23	Barnsley (R)	46	11	15	20	59	86	−27	48	Relegation to the Second Division

Rules for classification: 1) Points; 2) Goal difference; 3) Goals scored
(R) Relegated

== Results ==
Rotherham United's score comes first

=== Legend ===
Win	Draw	Loss

=== Football League First Division ===
Date	Opponent	Venue	Result	Attendance	Scorers
11 August 2001	Crystal Palace	H	2–3	6,994	Branston, Robins
18 August 2001	Watford	A	2–3	13,839	Robins (2)
23 August 2001	Sheffield United	H	1–1	7,515	Scott
27 August 2001	Barnsley	A	1–1	15,552	Robins
8 September 2001	Burnley	A	0–3	14,820	
15 September 2001	Norwich City	H	1–1	6,099	Robins (pen)
17 September 2001	Nottingham Forest	A	0–2	15,632	
22 September 2001	Gillingham	A	1–2	7,688	Robins
25 September 2001	Sheffield Wednesday	H	1–1	8,474	McIntosh
29 September 2001	Wolverhampton Wanderers	H	0–3	8,298	
5 October 2001	Grimsby Town	A	2–0	6,662	Robins (2)
12 October 2001	Portsmouth	H	2–1	6,427	Monkhouse, Beech
17 October 2001	Coventry City	H	0–0	6,582	
20 October 2001	Stockport County	A	1–0	6,616	Talbot
23 October 2001	Walsall	A	2–3	6,162	Scott, Monkhouse
27 October 2001	Wimbledon	H	3–2	5,586	Swailes, Robins (pen), McIntosh
30 October 2001	Crewe Alexandra	H	2–2	5,971	Robins, Swailes
4 November 2001	Birmingham City	A	2–2	28,436	Lee, Swailes
9 November 2001	Millwall	A	0–1	12,173	
17 November 2001	West Bromwich Albion	H	2–1	8,509	Swailes, Lee
24 November 2001	Manchester City	A	1–2	34,223	Swailes
1 December 2001	Walsall	H	2–0	6,273	Mullin, Lee
8 December 2001	Bradford City	A	1–3	14,529	Scott
15 December 2001	Preston North End	H	1–0	6,558	McIntosh
22 December 2001	Sheffield United	A	2–2	22,749	Watson, Swailes
29 December 2001	Barnsley	H	1–1	9,737	Barker
12 January 2002	Watford	H	1–1	6,409	Barker
19 January 2002	Crystal Palace	A	0–2	17,311	
29 January 2002	Grimsby Town	H	1–1	6,098	Lee
2 February 2002	Wolverhampton Wanderers	A	1–2	22,591	Lee
6 February 2002	Coventry City	A	0–2	12,893	
9 February 2002	Stockport County	H	3–2	6,413	Sedgwick, Robins (2, 1 pen)
12 February 2002	Burnley	H	1–1	9,021	Robins (pen)
16 February 2002	Portsmouth	A	0–0	13,313	
23 February 2002	Sheffield Wednesday	A	2–1	28,179	Lee, Barker
26 February 2002	Gillingham	H	3–2	6,005	Robins, Mullin, Daws
2 March 2002	Nottingham Forest	H	1–2	8,455	Robins (pen)
5 March 2002	Norwich City	A	0–0	18,485	
9 March 2002	Preston North End	A	1–2	14,579	Lee
16 March 2002	Bradford City	H	1–1	7,182	Lee (pen)
23 March 2002	Manchester City	H	1–1	11,426	Lee (pen)
30 March 2002	Wimbledon	A	0–1	4,751	
1 April 2002	Millwall	H	0–0	6,888	
7 April 2002	West Bromwich Albion	A	1–1	22,376	Byfield
13 April 2002	Birmingham City	H	2–2	10,536	Byfield, McIntosh
21 April 2002	Crewe Alexandra	A	0–2	7,904	

=== FA Cup ===
Round	Date	Opponent	Venue	Result	Attendance	Goalscorers
Third round	16 January 2002	Southampton	H	2–1	8,464	Barker, Mullin
Fourth round	26 January 2002	Crewe Alexandra	H	2–4	8,477	Mullin, Warne

=== League Cup ===
Round	Date	Opponent	Venue	Result	Attendance	Goalscorers
First round	20 August 2001	Scunthorpe United	A	2–0	2,589	Lee, Robins
Second round	11 September 2001	Bradford City	H	0–4	3,539	

== Players ==
=== First-team squad ===
Squad at end of season

Note: Flags indicate national team as defined under FIFA eligibility rules; some limited exceptions apply. Players may hold more than one non-FIFA nationality.

No.	Pos.	Nation	Player
1	GK	ENG	Mike Pollitt
2	DF	ENG	Chris Beech
3	DF	ENG	David Artell
4	DF	ENG	Rob Scott
5	MF	ENG	Darren Garner
6	DF	ENG	Marvin Bryan
7	FW	ENG	Mark Robins
8	DF	ENG	Chris Swailes
9	FW	IRL	Alan Lee
10	MF	ENG	Paul Warne
11	MF	ENG	Nick Daws
12	MF	ENG	Stewart Talbot
13	GK	ENG	Ian Gray
14	FW	ENG	Nathan Lowndes (on loan from Livingston)

No.	Pos.	Nation	Player
15	DF	SCO	Martin McIntosh
16	DF	ENG	Paul Hurst
17	MF	ENG	John Mullin
18	FW	POR	Jose Miranda
19	DF	WAL	Rhodri Jones
20	FW	ENG	Andy Monkhouse
21	MF	ENG	Danny Hudson
22	MF	WAL	Chris Holloway
23	FW	JAM	Darren Byfield
24	MF	ENG	Chris Sedgwick
28	DF	ENG	Guy Branston
29	FW	ENG	Richie Barker
30	GK	SCO	Ryan Esson (on loan from Aberdeen)

=== Left club during season ===
Note: Flags indicate national team as defined under FIFA eligibility rules; some limited exceptions apply. Players may hold more than one non-FIFA nationality.

No. / Pos. / Nation / Player; 14 / MF / ENG / Kevin Watson (to Reading)	No. / Pos. / Nation / Player; 23 / MF / ENG / Trevor Berry (to Waterford United)
