= List of Rotherham United F.C. seasons =

Rotherham United's league performance from their first season to the 2019–20 season.

Rotherham United Football Club is an association football club based in Rotherham, South Yorkshire. The club was formed in 1925 as a merger between Rotherham Town and Rotherham County when it was decided that having two professional clubs in the town was not sustainable. After the merger, the club was elected to play in the Football League Third Division North. United played in the Third Division North until 1950–51, when they were champions of the division and were promoted to the Second Division. During their first spell in the Second Division the club reached the fifth round of the FA Cup twice and were runners up in the inaugural Football League Cup, which is the furthest they have reached in these competitions. Their furthest Football League Trophy run saw the club win the competition twice, in the 1995–96 season defeating Shrewsbury Town 2–1 in the final; and in the 2021–22 season defeating Sutton United 4–2 after extra time in the final.

As of the end of 2022–23, the club's first team has remained in the English Football League since its formation. Their highest finish came in 1954–55 when they finished in third place in the Second Division, missing out on promotion to the top division only on goal average. In total the club has spent 27 seasons in the second tier of the English football league system, 47 in the third and 13 in the fourth. Rotherham has qualified for four Football League play-offs, in 1998–99 they lost in the Third Division semi-final to Leyton Orient, in 2009–10 they reached the League Two final but lost 3–2 to Dagenham & Redbridge, in 2013–14 they reached the League One final and defeated Leyton Orient in a penalty shoot-out to gain promotion the Football League Championship, and in 2017–18 they again reached the League One final and defeated Shrewsbury Town 2–1 to gain promotion the EFL Championship. The table details their achievements in first-team competitions for each completed season since their first appearance in the Football League in 1925–26.

== Key ==
Key to divisions

- Division 1 – Football League First Division
- Division 2 – Football League Second Division
- Division 3 – Football League Third Division
- Division 3N – Football League Third Division North
- Division 4 – Football League Fourth Division
- Championship – Football League Championship
- League 1 – Football League One
- League 2 – Football League Two

Key to rounds

- PR – Preliminary Round
- GS – Group Stage
- R1 – First Round, etc.
- QF – Quarter-finals
- SF – Semi-finals
- F(N) – Runner-up for the Northern section
- RU – Runner-up
- W – Winner

Key to positions and symbols

- 1st – Champions
- 2nd – Runners-up
- ↑ – Promoted
- ↓ – Relegated

== Seasons ==
Season	League record									FA Cup	EFL Cup	EFL Trophy	Top scorer(s) (Note: Includes goals scored in league games (including play-offs), FA Cup, EFL Cup and EFL Trophy.)	
Season	Division	Pld	W	D	L	GF	GA	Pts	Pos	FA Cup	EFL Cup	EFL Trophy	Player(s)	Goals
1925–26	Division 3N	42	17	7	18	69	92	41	14th	R3	—	—	Joe Scott	14
1926–27	Division 3N	42	10	12	20	70	92	32	19th	R1	—	—	Cyril Hemingway	11
1927–28	Division 3N	42	14	11	17	65	69	39	14th	R3	—	—	Joe Scott	21
1928–29	Division 3N	42	15	9	18	60	77	39	16th	R1	—	—	Billy Bottrill	11
1929–30	Division 3N	42	11	8	23	67	113	30	20th	R3	—	—	Egbert Murden	21
1930–31	Division 3N	42	13	12	17	81	83	38	14th	R1	—	—	Billy Hick	30
1931–32	Division 3N	40	14	4	22	63	72	32	19th	R1	—	—	Albert Parkin	15
1932–33	Division 3N	42	14	6	22	60	84	34	17th	R1	—	—	John Nock	10
1933–34	Division 3N	42	10	8	24	53	91	28	21st	R3	—	—	Vic Wright	18
1934–35	Division 3N	42	19	7	16	86	73	45	9th	R2	—	—	Billy Dickinson	25
1935–36	Division 3N	42	16	9	17	69	66	41	11th	R2	—	—	Billy Dickinson	18
1936–37	Division 3N	42	14	7	21	78	91	35	17th	R1	—	—	Ernest Smith	22
1937–38	Division 3N	42	20	10	12	68	56	50	6th	R2	—	—	Arnold Bramham	24
1938–39	Division 3N	42	17	8	17	64	64	42	11th	R1	—	—	Arnold Bramham	30
1939–40	Division 3N	3	1	1	1	5	6	3	11th (Note: When the Second World War began, the 1939–40 Football League season was abandoned with three matches played.)	—	—			
1939–45	No competitive football was played between 1939 and 1945 due to the Second World War.													
1945–46	N/A (Note: The FA Cup was contested in 1945–46 but the Football League did not resume until the following season.)									R4	—	—		
1946–47	Division 3N	42	29	6	7	114	53	64	2nd	R3	—	—	Wally Ardron	40
1947–48	Division 3N	42	25	9	8	95	49	59	2nd	R1	—	—	Wally Ardron	30
1948–49	Division 3N	42	28	6	8	90	46	62	2nd	R3	—	—	Wally Ardron	33
1949–50	Division 3N	42	19	10	13	80	59	48	6th	R3	—	—	Gladstone Guest	18
1950–51	Division 3N ↑	46	31	9	6	103	41	71	1st	R4	—	—	Jack Shaw	46
1951–52	Division 2	42	17	8	17	73	71	42	9th	R4	—	—	Jack Shaw	25
1952–53	Division 2	42	16	9	17	75	74	41	12th	R5	—	—	Jack Grainger	18
1953–54	Division 2	42	21	7	14	80	67	49	5th	R4	—	—	Ronnie Burke	33
1954–55	Division 2	42	25	4	13	94	64	54	3rd	R4	—	—	Jack Grainger	19
1955–56	Division 2	42	12	9	21	56	75	33	19th	R3	—	—	Ian Wilson	14
1956–57	Division 2	42	13	11	18	74	75	37	17th	R3	—	—	Peter Johnson Jack Grainger	14
1957–58	Division 2	42	14	5	23	65	101	33	18th	R3	—	—	Barry Webster	12
1958–59	Division 2	42	10	9	23	42	82	29	20th	R3	—	—	Barry Webster	12
1959–60	Division 2	42	17	13	12	61	60	47	8th	R4	—	—	Brian Sawyer	21
1960–61	Division 2	42	12	13	17	65	64	37	15th	R4	RU	—	Ken Houghton Alan Kirkman	14
1961–62	Division 2	42	16	9	17	70	76	41	9th	R3	QF	—	Alan Kirkman	22
1962–63	Division 2	42	17	6	19	67	74	40	14th	R3	R4	—	Albert Bennett	23
1963–64	Division 2	42	19	7	16	90	78	45	7th	R3	QF	—	Brian Tiler Ken Houghton	22
1964–65	Division 2	42	14	12	16	70	69	40	14th	R4	R3	—	Albert Bennett	27
1965–66	Division 2	42	16	14	12	75	74	46	7th	R4	R4	—	John Galley	22
1966–67	Division 2	42	13	10	19	61	70	36	18th	R4	R3	—	Les Chappell	17
1967–68	Division 2 ↓	42	10	11	21	42	76	31	21st	R5	R2	—	John Galley	7
1968–69	Division 3	46	16	13	17	56	50	45	11th	R2	R1	—	Jim Storrie	15
1969–70	Division 3	46	15	14	17	62	54	44	14th	R3	R3	—	Steve Downes	11
1970–71	Division 3	46	17	16	13	64	60	50	8th	R3	R2	—	Dave Watson	12
1971–72	Division 3	46	20	15	11	69	52	55	5th	R4	R1	—	Carl Gilbert	27
1972–73	Division 3 ↓	46	17	7	22	51	65	41	21st	R2	R3	—	Bobby Ham	10
1973–74	Division 4	46	15	13	18	56	58	43	15th	R2	R2	—	Ron Wigg	15
1974–75	Division 4 ↑	46	22	15	9	71	41	59	3rd	R3	R2	—	Richard Finney	17
1975–76	Division 3	46	15	12	19	54	65	42	16th	R2	R1	—	Richard Finney	11
1976–77	Division 3	46	22	15	9	69	44	59	4th	R3	R2	—	Alan Crawford	31
1977–78	Division 3	46	13	13	20	51	68	39	20th	R3	R2	—	Richard Finney	16
1978–79	Division 3	46	17	10	19	49	55	44	17th	R3	R3	—	Dave Gwyther	18
1979–80	Division 3	46	18	10	18	58	66	46	13th	R2	R2	—	Richard Finney	13
1980–81	Division 3 ↑	46	24	13	9	62	32	61	1st	R2	R1	—	Ronnie Moore	25
1981–82	Division 2	42	20	7	15	66	54	67	7th	R3	R2	—	Ronnie Moore	25
1982–83	Division 2 ↓	42	10	15	17	45	68	45	20th	R3	R3	—	John Seasman Joe McBride	11
1983–84	Division 3	46	15	9	22	57	64	54	18th	R3	QF	R1	Kevin Kilmore	21
1984–85	Division 3	46	18	11	17	55	55	65	12th	R1	R3	R1	Tony Simmons	14
1985–86	Division 3	46	15	12	19	61	59	57	14th	R4	R1	QF	Tommy Tynan	17
1986–87	Division 3	46	15	12	19	48	57	57	14th	R1	R2	PR	Gareth Evans	11
1987–88	Division 3 ↓	46	12	16	18	50	66	52	21st	R2	R2	R1	Paul Haycock	14
1988–89	Division 4 ↑	46	22	16	8	76	35	82	1st	R2	R2	R1	Bobby Williamson	28
1989–90	Division 3	46	17	13	16	71	62	64	9th	R2	R2	QF	Bobby Williamson	25
1990–91	Division 3 ↓	46	10	12	24	50	87	42	23rd	R4	R2	R1	Clive Mendonca	12
1991–92	Division 4 ↑	42	22	11	9	70	37	77	2nd	R2	R1	QF	Tony Cunningham	20
1992–93	Division 2 (Note: The Third Division was renamed Division Two after the FA Premier League broke away from the Football League.)	46	17	14	15	60	60	65	11th	R4	R2	R2	Tony Cunningham	12
1993–94	Division 2	46	15	13	18	63	60	58	15th	R1	R2	R2	Imre Varadi	21
1994–95	Division 2	46	14	14	18	57	61	56	17th	R2	R1	R2	Shaun Goater	25
1995–96	Division 2	46	14	14	18	54	62	56	16th	R1	R2	W	Earl Jean	6
1996–97	Division 2 ↓	46	7	14	25	39	70	35	23rd	R1	R1	R1	Leo Fortune-West	17
1997–98	Division 3	46	16	19	11	67	61	67	9th	R3	R1	R2	Lee Glover	18
1998–99	Division 3	46	20	13	13	79	61	73	5th (Note: Lost in the play-off semi-final to Leyton Orient 4–2 in a penalty shootout after each leg ended 0–0.)	R3	R1	R1	Leo Fortune-West Lee Glover	12
1999–2000	Division 3 ↑	46	24	12	10	72	36	84	2nd	R2	R1	R2	Leo Fortune-West	17
2000–01	Division 2 ↑	46	27	10	9	79	55	91	2nd	R3	R1	R1	Mark Robins	26
2001–02	Division 1	46	10	19	17	52	66	49	21st	R4	R2	—	Mark Robins	16
2002–03	Division 1	46	15	14	17	62	62	59	15th	R3	R4	—	Alan Lee	16
2003–04	Division 1	46	13	15	18	53	61	54	17th	R3	R3	—	Martin Butler	15
2004–05	Championship (Note: Before the 2004–05 season, The Football League re-branded Division One as the Football League Championship. Divisions Two and Three became Leagues One and Two, respectively.)↓	46	5	14	27	35	69	29	24th	R3	R2	—	Martin Butler	6
2005–06	League 1	46	12	16	18	52	62	52	20th	R1	R2	R2	Deon Burton	14
2006–07	League 1 ↓	46	13	9	24	58	75	38 (Note: 10 points deducted for entering administration.)	23rd	R1	R2	R1	Will Hoskins	16
2007–08	League 2	46	21	11	14	62	58	64	9th	R1	R1	R2	Derek Holmes Chris O'Grady	11
2008–09	League 2	46	21	12	13	60	46	58 (Note: 17 points deducted for not satisfying the normal conditions of Football League rules for exiting administration.)	14th	R1	R4	F(N)	Reuben Reid	19
2009–10	League 2	46	21	10	15	55	52	73	5th (Note: Beat Aldershot Town 3–0 on aggregate in the semi-final before losing 3–2 to Dagenham & Redbridge in the 2010 Football League Two play-off final.)	R2	R2	R1	Adam Le Fondre	30
2010–11	League 2	46	17	15	14	75	60	66	9th	R1	R1	QF	Adam Le Fondre	25
2011–12	League 2	46	18	13	15	67	63	67	10th	R2	R1	R2	Lewis Grabban	20
2012–13	League 2 ↑	46	24	7	15	74	59	79	2nd	R3	R1	R1	Daniel Nardiello	13
2013–14	League 1 ↑	46	24	14	8	86	58	86	4th (Note: Promoted into the Football League Championship via the play-offs, beating Preston North End 4–2 on aggregate in the semi-final and Leyton Orient 4–3 on penalties in the 2014 Football League One play-off final.)	R2	R2	SF	Kieran Agard	18
2014–15	Championship	46	11	16	19	46	67	46 (Note: Three points deducted for fielding an ineligible player.)	21st	R3	R2	—	Matt Derbyshire	10
2015–16	Championship	46	13	10	23	53	71	49	21st	R3	R2	—	Matt Derbyshire	8
2016–17	Championship ↓	46	5	8	33	40	98	23	24th	R3	R1	—	Danny Ward	12
2017–18	League 1 ↑	46	24	7	15	73	53	79	4th (Note: Promoted into the EFL Championship via the play-offs, beating Scunthorpe United 4–2 on aggregate in the semi-final and Shrewsbury Town 2–1 in the 2018 EFL League One play-off final.)	R1	R2	R1	Kieffer Moore	13
2018–19	Championship ↓	46	8	16	22	36	77	40	22nd	R3	R2	—	Semi Ajayi Michael Smith Will Vaulks	8
2019–20	League 1 ↑	35	18	8	9	61	38	62	2nd (Note: The 2019–20 season was curtailed due to the COVID-19 pandemic, with league positions decided on a points-per-game basis. Rotherham United averaged 1.77 points from 35 games.)	R3	R2	GS	Freddie Ladapo	17
2020–21	Championship ↓	46	11	9	26	44	60	42	23rd	R3	R1	—	Michael Smith	10
2021–22	League 1 ↑	46	27	9	10	70	33	90	2nd	R3	R1	W	Michael Smith	25
2022–23	Championship	46	11	17	18	49	60	50	19th	R3	R2	—	Chiedozie Ogbene	9
2023–24	Championship ↓	46	5	12	29	37	89	27	24th	R3	R2	—	Tom Eaves	6
2024–25	League 1	46	16	11	19	49	54	59	13th	R1	R2	QF	Sam Nombe	15
2025–26	League One ↓	46	10	11	25	41	71	41	22nd	R1	R2	R of 16	Sam Nombe	12
