= 1999–2000 Rotherham United F.C. season =

Rotherham United
1999–2000 season
- Football League Third Division: 2nd
- FA Cup: Second round
- League Cup: First round
- Football League Trophy: Second round
- Top goalscorer: Leo Fortune-West (17)
Home colours

During the 1999–2000 English football season, Rotherham United Football Club competed in the Football League Third Division where they finished in 2nd position on 84 points and gained promotion to the Football League Second Division.

== Final league table ==
Pos	Team	Pld	W	D	L	GF	GA	GD	Pts	Promotion or relegation
1	Swansea City (C, P)	46	24	13	9	51	30	+21	85	Promotion to the Second Division
2	Rotherham United (P)	46	24	12	10	72	36	+36	84	Promotion to the Second Division
3	Northampton Town (P)	46	25	7	14	63	45	+18	82	Promotion to the Second Division
4	Darlington	46	21	16	9	66	36	+30	79	Qualification for the Third Division play-offs
5	Peterborough United (O, P)	46	22	12	12	63	54	+9	78	Qualification for the Third Division play-offs

Rules for classification: 1) Points; 2) Goal difference; 3) Goals scored
(C) Champions; (O) Play-off winners; (P) Promoted

== Results ==
Rotherham United's score comes first

=== Legend ===
Win	Draw	Loss

=== Football League Division Three ===
Match	Date	Opponent	Venue	Result	Attendance	Scorers
1	7 August 1999	Lincoln City	A	1–2	4,494	Warne 90'
2	14 August 1999	Chester City	H	4–0	2,966	Martindale 54' 58' (2 pens), Fortune-West 81', Watson 88'
3	21 August 1999	Exeter City	A	1–3	2,646	Garner 23'
4	28 August 1999	Shrewsbury Town	H	4–0	2,708	Turner 2', Scott 3', Garner 21', 33'
5	30 August 1999	Macclesfield Town	A	1–1	2,307	Fortune-West 86'
6	4 September 1999	York City	H	1–0	3,171	Garner 59'
7	11 September 1999	Plymouth Argyle	A	1–1	4,075	Berry 49'
8	18 September 1999	Rochdale	H	0–1	3,568	
9	25 September 1999	Northampton Town	H	3–0	3,625	Thompson 14', 80' (2 pens), Fortune-West 52'
10	2 October 1999	Cheltenham Town	A	2–0	3,331	Thompson 37' (pen), Warne 47'
11	12 October 1999	Swansea City	A	0–2	5,287	
12	16 October 1999	Barnet	H	2–0	3,596	Fortune-West 10', Sedgwick 67'
13	19 October 1999	Hartkepool United	H	3–0	3,340	Garner 7', 14', Berry 30'
14	23 October 1999	Northampton Town	A	0–1	5,753	
15	2 November 1999	Torquay United	H	1–0	3,892	Berry 27'
16	6 November 1999	Hull City	A	0–0	7,045	
17	12 November 1999	Leyton Orient	H	0–1	4,280	
18	23 November 1999	Mansfield Town	A	2–1	2,937	Berry 27', Sedgwick 90'
19	27 November 1999	Carlisle United	A	1–0	2,649	Hurst 90'
20	4 December 1999	Lincoln City	H	1–1	3,674	Garner 45'
21	11 December 1999	Halifax Town	A	0–0	2,583	
22	18 December 1999	Darlington	H	2–1	4,234	White 83', 88'
23	26 December 1999	Peterborough United	A	5–0	10,789	Hudson 2', Warne 34', 49', Thompson 71', Fortune-West 74'
24	28 December 1999	Brighton & Hove Albion	H	1–3	5,924	Branston 83'
25	3 January 2000	Southend United	A	2–1	4,728	Fortune-West 26', 40'
26	8 January 2000	Halifax Town	H	0–1	4,450	
27	15 January 2000	Chester City	A	2–0	3,398	Warne 21', Fortune-West 54'
28	22 January 2000	Exeter City	H	5–0	3,402	Fortune-West 5', 7', Warne 12', 86', Wilsterman 82'
29	29 January 2000	Shrewsbury Town	A	0–0	2,587	
30	5 February 2000	Macclesfield Town	H	2–1	4,175	Sedgwick 31' (pen), Fortune-West 44'
31	12 February 2000	York City	H	2–1	4,531	Fortune-West 7', Branston 90'
32	19 February 2000	Carlisle United	H	4–2	4,271	Fortune-West 22', 32', 73', Wilsterman 50'
33	26 February 2000	Rochdale	A	1–0	4,131	White 58'
34	4 March 2000	Plymouth Argyle	H	1–1	4,496	Warne 76'
35	7 March 2000	Hull City	H	3–0	4,881	Wilsterman 74', Fortune-West 76', Warne 84'
36	11 March 2000	Torquay United	A	1–2	2,655	Thompson 42'
37	17 March 2000	Mansfield Town	H	2–3	5,186	Sedgwick 35', 69'
38	21 March 2000	Leyton Orient	H	1–0	3,959	Garner 58'
39	25 March 2000	Peterborough United	H	1–1	5,319	Hurst 14'
40	1 April 2000	Darlington	A	2–2	7,401	Branston 55', Tutill 59' (o.g.)
41	8 April 2000	Darlington	H	0–0	4,327	
42	15 April 2000	Brighton & Hove Albion	A	1–1	5,805	Thompson 32'
43	22 April 2000	Barnet	A	0–1	3,239	
44	24 April 2000	Cheltenham Town	H	2–0	5,447	Garner 12', White 84'
45	29 April 2000	Hartlepool United	A	2–1	4,673	Fortune-West 6', Branston 49'
46	6 May 2000	Swansea City	H	1–1	10,863	Glover 90' (pen)

=== League Cup ===
Round	Date	Opponent	Venue	Result	Attendance	Scorers
First round first leg	10 August 1999	Hull City	H	0–1	3,294	
First round second leg	24 August 1999	Hull City	A	0–2 (Note: Rotherham United lost 3–0 on aggregate)	4,373	

=== FA Cup ===
Round	Date	Opponent	Venue	Result	Attendance	Scorers
First round	30 October 1999	Woking	H	3–0	3,716	Thompson 31', Garner 81', Martindale 90' (pen)
Second round	20 November 1999	Burnley	A	0–2	8,110	

=== Football League Trophy ===
Round	Date	Opponent	Venue	Result	Attendance	Scorers
First round	7 December 1999	Shrewsbury Town	H	2–1	1,166	Hanmer 18' (o.g.), Sedgwick 72'
Second round	11 January 2000	Chesterfield	H	1–4	1,997	White 61'

== First-team squad ==
Appearances for competitive matches only

Pos.	Name	League		FA Cup		League Cup		Football League Trophy		Total	
Pos.	Name	Apps	Goals	Apps	Goals	Apps	Goals	Apps	Goals	Apps	Goals
DF	(England) David Artell	0(1)	0	0	0	0	0	0	0	0(1)	0
DF	(England) Chris Beech	5(1)	0	0	0	2	0	0	0	7(1)	0
MF	(England) Trevor Berry	18(18)	4	2	0	0(1)	0	0(2)	0	20(21)	4
DF	(England) Guy Branston	30	4	0	0	0	0	2	0	32	4
DF	(Republic of Ireland) Paul Dillon	15	0	2	0	2	0	0	0	19	0
FW	(England) Leo Fortune-West	39	17	2	0	2	0	0	0	43	17
MF	(England) Darren Garner	35	9	2	1	1(1)	0	1	0	39(1)	9
FW	(Scotland) Lee Glover	0(6)	1	0	0	0	0	0	0	0(6)	1
MF	(England) Danny Hudson	3(4)	1	0	0	0	0	1	0	4(4)	1
DF	(England) Paul Hurst	25(5)	2	0(2)	0	0	0	1	0	26(7)	2
MF	(England) Jamie Ingledow	2(2)	0	0	0	1	0	1(1)	0	4(3)	0
FW	(England) Gary Martindale	4(5)	2	0(2)	1	1	0	0(1)	0	5(8)	3
GK	(England) Mike Pollitt	46	0	2	0	2	0	2	0	52	0
DF	(England) Rob Scott	33(1)	1	2	0	1(1)	0	2	0	38(2)	1
MF	(England) Chris Sedgwick	29(9)	5	0(2)	0	1	0	2	1	32(11)	6
MF	(England) Steve Thompson	27(4)	6	2	1	0	0	1	0	30(4)	6
MF	(England) Andy Turner	26(6)	1	0	0	2	0	1	0	29(6)	1
DF	(England) Will Varty	26(1)	0	2	0	2	0	0(1)	0	30(2)	0
FW	(England) Paul Warne	40(3)	10	2	0	1(1)	0	2	0	45(4)	10
DF	(England) Vance Warner	16(3)	0	0	0	0(1)	0	0	0	16(4)	0
MF	(England) Kevin Watson	44	1	2	0	2	0	2	0	50	1
FW	(England) Jason White	8(12)	4	0	0	0	0	2	1	10(12)	5
DF	(Suriname) Brian Wilsterman	38(4)	3	2	0	2	0	2	0	44(4)	3

== See also ==
- 1999–2000 in English football
