= 2004–05 Rotherham United F.C. season =

Rotherham United
2004–05 season
- Chairman: Peter Ruchniewicz
- Manager: Ronnie Moore (until January); Alan Knill (caretaker until 7 April); Mick Harford (from 7 April)
- Stadium: Millmoor
- Championship: 24th (relegated)
- FA Cup: Third round
- League Cup: Second round
- Top goalscorer: Butler (6)
- Average home league attendance: 5,577
Home colours

During the 2004–05 English football season, Rotherham United F.C. competed in the Football League Championship.

== Season summary ==
During the 2004–05 season, the club struggled and spent most of the season bottom of the league. The club was bought by the consortium, Millers 05. Ronnie Moore left by mutual consent during the campaign, after his team were rooted to the bottom of the division for the majority of the season.

After relegation to League One in April 2005, Mick Harford took over as Millers manager.

== Final league table ==
| Pos | Team | Pld | W | D | L | GF | GA | GD | Pts | Promotion, qualification or relegation |
|---|---|---|---|---|---|---|---|---|---|---|
| 20 | Brighton & Hove Albion | 46 | 13 | 12 | 21 | 40 | 65 | −25 | 51 | |
| 21 | Crewe Alexandra | 46 | 12 | 14 | 20 | 66 | 86 | −20 | 50 | |
| 22 | Gillingham (R) | 46 | 12 | 14 | 20 | 45 | 66 | −21 | 50 | Relegation to Football League One |
| 23 | Nottingham Forest (R) | 46 | 9 | 17 | 20 | 42 | 66 | −24 | 44 | Relegation to Football League One |
| 24 | Rotherham United (R) | 46 | 5 | 14 | 27 | 35 | 69 | −34 | 29 | Relegation to Football League One |

Updated to match(es) played on 9 December 2011. Source: Football League Tables
Rules for classification: 1) points; 2) goal difference; 3) number of goals scored.
(R) Relegated

== Results ==
Rotherham United's score comes first

=== Legend ===
| Win | Draw | Loss |

=== Football League Championship ===
| Date | Opponent | Venue | Result | Attendance | Scorers |
|---|---|---|---|---|---|
| 7 August 2004 | Queens Park Rangers | A | 1–1 | 14,547 | Shaw |
| 10 August 2004 | Burnley | H | 0–0 | 6,243 | |
| 14 August 2004 | Stoke City | H | 1–1 | 5,925 | Shaw |
| 21 August 2004 | Reading | A | 0–1 | 11,404 | |
| 28 August 2004 | Ipswich Town | H | 0–2 | 5,504 | |
| 30 August 2004 | Preston North End | A | 0–2 | 11,439 | |
| 11 September 2004 | Leicester City | H | 0–2 | 6,272 | |
| 14 September 2004 | West Ham United | A | 0–1 | 26,233 | |
| 18 September 2004 | Coventry City | A | 0–0 | 13,834 | |
| 25 September 2004 | Millwall | H | 1–1 | 5,062 | Sedgwick |
| 28 September 2004 | Crewe Alexandra | H | 2–3 | 4,498 | Burchill, Barker |
| 2 October 2004 | Wigan Athletic | A | 0–2 | 7,937 | |
| 16 October 2004 | Cardiff City | A | 0–2 | 11,004 | |
| 19 October 2004 | Plymouth Argyle | H | 0–1 | 5,088 | |
| 25 October 2004 | Sunderland | H | 0–1 | 6,026 | |
| 30 October 2004 | Derby County | A | 2–3 | 25,096 | Swailes, Scott |
| 3 November 2004 | Nottingham Forest | A | 2–2 | 21,619 | Sedgwick, Júnior |
| 6 November 2004 | Cardiff City | H | 2–2 | 5,093 | McLaren, Proctor |
| 13 November 2004 | Wolverhampton Wanderers | H | 1–2 | 6,693 | McIntosh |
| 20 November 2004 | Watford | A | 0–0 | 17,780 | |
| 29 November 2004 | Leeds United | H | 1–0 | 8,860 | McIntosh |
| 4 December 2004 | Brighton & Hove Albion | A | 0–1 | 6,076 | |
| 11 December 2004 | Sheffield United | H | 2–2 | 8,195 | Swailes, McIntosh |
| 18 December 2004 | Gillingham | A | 1–3 | 8,576 | Hoskins |
| 26 December 2004 | Leicester City | A | 1–0 | 27,014 | Barker |
| 28 December 2004 | West Ham United | H | 2–2 | 7,769 | Butler, McIntosh |
| 1 January 2005 | Coventry City | H | 1–2 | 5,742 | Júnior |
| 3 January 2005 | Millwall | A | 2–1 | 11,725 | Butler, Scott |
| 15 January 2005 | Wigan Athletic | H | 0–2 | 9,050 | |
| 22 January 2005 | Crewe Alexandra | A | 1–1 | 6,382 | Mullin |
| 5 February 2005 | Nottingham Forest | H | 0–0 | 8,448 | |
| 12 February 2005 | Plymouth Argyle | A | 1–1 | 14,798 | Monkhouse |
| 19 February 2005 | Derby County | H | 1–3 | 7,937 | Butler (pen) |
| 22 February 2005 | Sunderland | A | 1–4 | 22,267 | Monkhouse |
| 26 February 2005 | Sheffield United | A | 0–1 | 18,431 | |
| 5 March 2005 | Gillingham | H | 1–3 | 4,367 | Butler |
| 12 March 2005 | Burnley | A | 1–2 | 10,539 | Gilchrist |
| 15 March 2005 | Reading | H | 1–0 | 3,804 | Warne |
| 19 March 2005 | Queens Park Rangers | H | 0–1 | 5,387 | |
| 2 April 2005 | Stoke City | A | 2–1 | 16,552 | Butler, Noel-Williams (own goal) |
| 5 April 2005 | Ipswich Town | A | 3–4 | 26,017 | Thorpe, Butler, McIntosh |
| 9 April 2005 | Preston North End | H | 1–2 | 6,312 | Hoskins |
| 16 April 2005 | Watford | H | 0–1 | 5,438 | |
| 23 April 2005 | Wolverhampton Wanderers | A | 0–2 | 25,177 | |
| 30 April 2005 | Brighton & Hove Albion | H | 0–1 | 6,549 | |
| 8 May 2005 | Leeds United | A | 0–0 | 30,900 | |

=== FA Cup ===
| Round | Date | Opponent | Venue | Result | Attendance | Goalscorers |
|---|---|---|---|---|---|---|
| R3 | 8 January 2005 | Yeovil Town | H | 0–3 | 5,397 | |

=== League Cup ===
| Round | Date | Opponent | Venue | Result | Attendance | Goalscorers |
|---|---|---|---|---|---|---|
| R1 | 24 August 2004 | Chesterfield | H | 2–1 | 3,845 | Proctor, Barker |
| R2 | 22 September 2004 | Nottingham Forest | A | 1–2 | 11,168 | Sedgwick |

== First-team squad ==
Squad at end of season

Note: Flags indicate national team as defined under FIFA eligibility rules; some limited exceptions apply. Players may hold more than one non-FIFA nationality.

| No. | Pos. | Nation | Player |
|---|---|---|---|
| 1 | GK | ENG | Mike Pollitt |
| 4 | DF | ENG | Rob Scott |
| 5 | MF | ENG | Darren Garner |
| 6 | DF | ENG | Phil Gilchrist |
| 7 | FW | ENG | Michael Proctor |
| 8 | DF | ENG | Chris Swailes |
| 9 | FW | ENG | Martin Butler |
| 10 | FW | ENG | Paul Warne |
| 11 | MF | ENG | Nick Daws |
| 12 | FW | ENG | Marc Newsham |
| 14 | FW | ENG | Will Hoskins |
| 15 | DF | SCO | Martin McIntosh |

| No. | Pos. | Nation | Player |
|---|---|---|---|
| 16 | DF | ENG | Paul Hurst |
| 17 | MF | ENG | John Mullin |
| 18 | DF | ENG | Scott Minto |
| 19 | MF | ENG | Paulo Vernazza |
| 20 | FW | ENG | Andy Monkhouse |
| 21 | MF | JAM | Jamal Campbell-Ryce (Note: Campbell-Ryce was born in Lambeth, England, but also qualified to represent Jamaica internationally through his parents and made his international debut for Jamaica in 2003.) |
| 22 | DF | ENG | Shaun Barker |
| 23 | MF | ENG | Paul McLaren |
| 24 | MF | ENG | Ben Bradford |
| 25 | MF | IRL | Michael Keane |
| 29 | MF | ENG | Sam Duncum |
| 30 | GK | ENG | Gary Montgomery |

=== Left club during season ===
Note: Flags indicate national team as defined under FIFA eligibility rules; some limited exceptions apply. Players may hold more than one non-FIFA nationality.

| No. | Pos. | Nation | Player |
|---|---|---|---|
| 2 | DF | SCO | Robbie Stockdale (Note: Stockdale was born in Redcar, England, but also qualified to represent Scotland internationally and made his international debut for Scotland in 2002.) (to Hull City) |
| 21 | FW | ENG | Paul Shaw (on loan from Sheffield United) |
| 24 | MF | ENG | Chris Sedgwick (to Preston North End) |
| 24 | MF | FRA | Léandre Griffit (on loan from Southampton) |

| No. | Pos. | Nation | Player |
|---|---|---|---|
| 27 | FW | SCO | Mark Burchill (on loan from Portsmouth) |
| 27 | FW | BRA | José Júnior (on loan from Derby County) |
| 28 | FW | ENG | Tony Thorpe (on loan from Queens Park Rangers) |
| 29 | FW | ENG | Richard Barker (to Mansfield Town) |
