= David Artell =

Gibraltarian-English football manager and former player (born 1980)

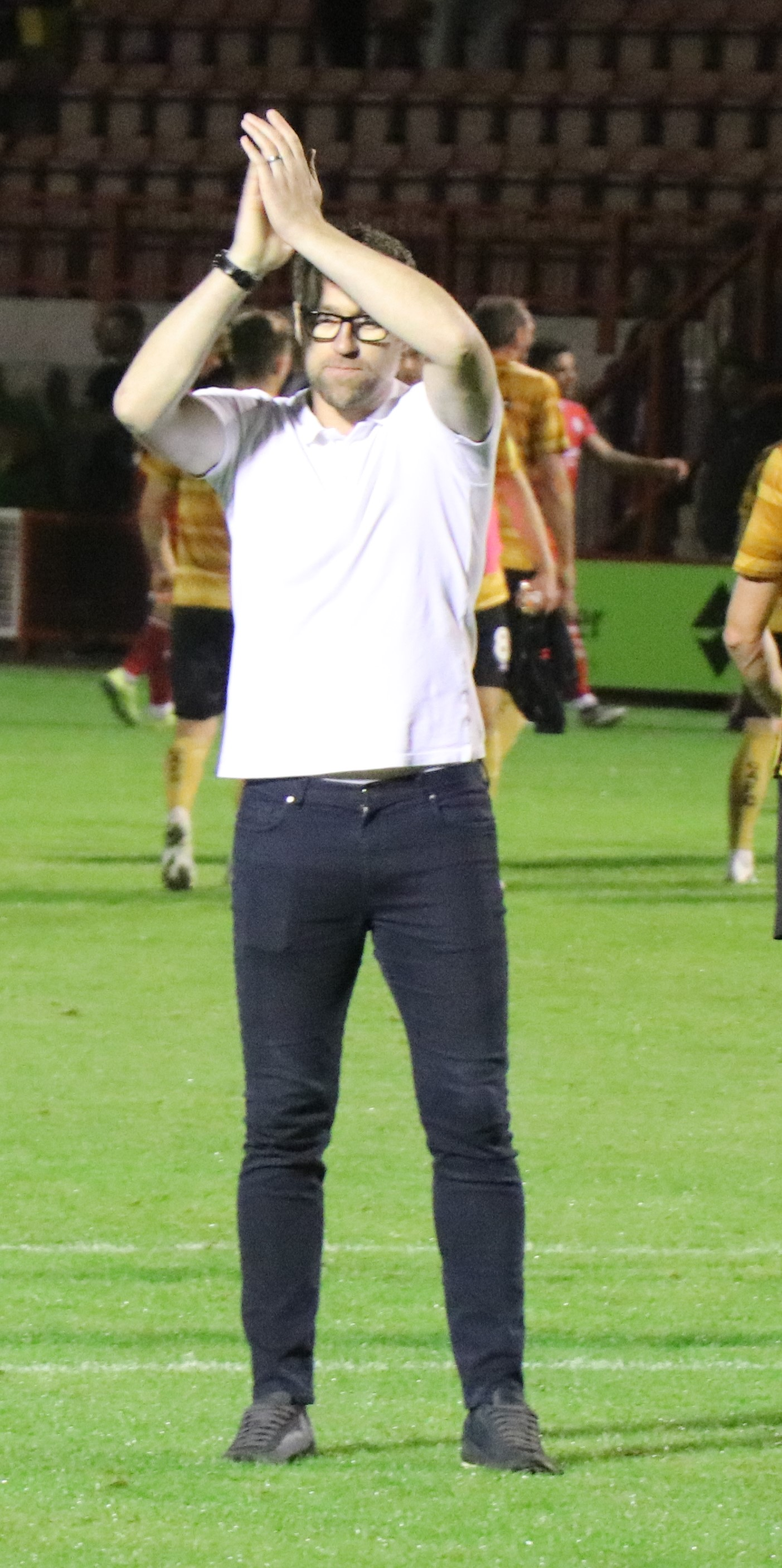
- Artell as Crewe Alexandra manager in August 2019

Personal information
- Full name: David John Artell
- Date of birth: 22 November 1980 (age 45)
- Place of birth: Rotherham, England
- Height: 6 ft 3 in (1.91 m)
- Position: Centre back

Team information
- Current team: Grimsby Town (head coach)

Senior career*
Years	Team	Apps	(Gls)
1998–2003	Rotherham United	37	(4)
2002–2003	→ Shrewsbury Town (loan)	28	(1)
2003–2005	Mansfield Town	45	(5)
2005–2007	Chester City	80	(4)
2007–2010	Morecambe	110	(13)
2010–2012	Crewe Alexandra	72	(6)
2012	Port Vale	0	(0)
2012–2013	Northampton Town	11	(3)
2013	→ Wrexham (loan)	8	(0)
2013–2014	Wrexham	28	(3)
2014–2016	Bala Town	39	(2)
2016	Port Talbot Town	7	(1)
2016	Kidsgrove Athletic		(0)
2016–2017	Droylsden		
Total		467	(40)

International career
2014–2015	Gibraltar	7	(0)

Managerial career
- 2017–2022: Crewe Alexandra
- 2023–: Grimsby Town
- * Club domestic league appearances and goals

David John Artell (born 22 November 1980) is a football manager and former professional player who is currently the head coach of EFL League Two club Grimsby Town. Born in England, he won seven caps for the Gibraltar national team between 2014 and 2015.

Artell began his career as a centre back with his hometown club Rotherham United in 1998, and played his part in the club's successive promotions from the Third Division to the First Division in the 1999–2000 and 2000–01 seasons. He then joined Shrewsbury Town on loan for the 2002–03 season, followed by successive two-year permanent spells at Mansfield Town and Chester City between 2003 and 2007, before leaving the latter for Morecambe. In 2010, Artell joined Crewe Alexandra, and went on to captain the side to victory in the 2012 League Two play-off final. In July 2012, he joined Port Vale, but left abruptly to join Northampton Town the following month. A loan spell at Wrexham during the 2012–13 campaign followed, and was later made permanent. Artell remained in Wales, going onto play for Bala Town and Port Talbot Town between 2014 and 2016, before returning to England with Kidsgrove Athletic, and Droylsden, the latter of which he retired with in 2017.

In January 2017, Artell was appointed as first-team manager by his former club Crewe Alexandra, where he had been the academy operations manager for the previous three years. He led The Railwaymen to automatic promotion from League Two in the 2019–20 season, despite its disruption due to COVID-19, and then oversaw the club's highest finish in 15 years in the 2020–21 season, finishing 12th in League One. However, the 2021–22 campaign proved to be one of the worst in Crewe's modern history; in April 2022, they were relegated back to the fourth tier with four games to spare, and Artell was sacked by the club that month after five years in charge. In November 2023, Artell was appointed head coach of League Two club Grimsby Town.

== Club career ==
=== Rotherham United ===
A centre back, Artell began his career with his hometown club Rotherham United, making his debut as a substitute on 12 October 1999 in a 2–0 defeat to Swansea City at Vetch Field – his only appearance that season, in which The Millers won promotion as Third Division runners-up. He scored his first senior goal the following season; a header in a 1–1 draw with Stoke City at the Britannia Stadium on 23 September 2000. Artell made 40 appearances in the 2000–01 campaign, playing a vital role in the club's second successive promotion from the Second Division. Despite this, he never featured at Millmoor in the First Division under manager Ronnie Moore.

In September 2002, Artell joined Third Division side Shrewsbury Town on loan for the remainder of the 2002–03 season. On 4 January 2003, Shrews defeated Premier League giants Everton 2–1 at the Gay Meadow in the FA Cup third round, a major cup upset in which Artell featured. He also featured in the following round as they were beaten comprehensively by another Premier League outfit in Chelsea, who ran out 4–0 winners at the Gay Meadow on 11 February 2003. That season was ultimately a disappointing one for Salop, as they were relegated from the Football League after finishing rock-bottom of the Third Division. Artell later said the dressing room was divided between younger and older players under manager Kevin Ratcliffe. In May 2003, Artell returned to Rotherham but was released by the club.

=== Mansfield Town ===
After leaving Rotherham United, Artell joined Third Division side Mansfield Town on a short-term contract at the start of the 2003–04 season. He made 32 appearances during that season and was also an unused substitute in the Stags' play-off final defeat to Huddersfield Town at the Millennium Stadium on 31 May 2004. Artell went on to make 23 appearances in the 2004–05 season, but was then forced to undergo surgery, and was eventually frozen out of the first-team picture after manager Keith Curle was replaced by Carlton Palmer in November 2004.

=== Chester City ===
In July 2005, Artell followed Keith Curle, his manager at Mansfield the previous season, out of Field Mill and onto League Two side Chester City. The move was surrounded by accusations of an 'illegal approach' by the Seals for Artell's services. He featured 41 times in the 2005–06 season, retaining his first-team spot at the Deva Stadium under new boss Mark Wright. Artell racked up a further 50 appearances for the club during the 2006–07 season, before being released by manager Bobby Williamson in May 2007, after he and the club were unsuccessful in their attempts to negotiate a new contract that would have extended Artell's stay at the club.

=== Morecambe ===
In July 2007, Artell joined Football League newcomers Morecambe. His first goal for the Shrimps came in only his second competitive appearance for the club, scoring a last-minute winner to stun Lancashire rivals Preston North End 2–1 at Deepdale in the League Cup first round. He went on to form a strong defensive partnership with Jim Bentley, notching a total of 44 appearances in the 2007–08 season. However, in November 2008, by which point Artell had lost his regular first-team place, he was told by manager Sammy McIlroy that he was free to leave the club on loan. Artell, however, decided to stay at Christie Park and fight for his first-team spot, which he eventually won back; he made a further 43 appearances for the side in the 2008–09 season.

The following campaign, he made 42 appearances for the Shrimps and scored eight goals, all of which proved vital in the club's qualification for the League Two play-offs following an impressive fourth-place finish. In their first-leg semi-final tie at Dagenham & Redbridge, Morecambe were thrashed 6–0, and were condemned to another season in League Two with a 7–2 defeat on aggregate despite their 2–1 victory in the tie's second-leg, during which Artell scored what would prove to be the final ever goal at Christie Park, prior to its demolition that year and the Shrimps' subsequent move to the Mazuma Mobile Stadium.

=== Crewe Alexandra ===
In June 2010, Artell joined League Two side Crewe Alexandra on a free transfer, penning a two-year contract. He said he was excited at the chance to work closely with manager Dario Gradi, whose status as a renowned coach further compelled him to join the club. Immediately after joining the club, Artell was appointed co-captain alongside Lee Bell and Ashley Westwood. In March 2011, he had a minor bust-up with Gradi after being substituted during a home win against Chesterfield, but the issue was later resolved.

A hamstring injury kept Artell out of the first couple of months of the 2011–12 season. In December 2011, he was named Crewe's sole captain by new manager Steve Davis. The following month, he was sent off for a "dangerous tackle" on Barnet's Izale McLeod in a 2–0 defeat. In February 2012, Artell had an on-the-pitch row with goalkeeper teammate Steve Phillips; Phillips was booked for the row – it was the second time that season that the goalkeeper was involved in an on-the-pitch row with a teammate. The following month, in March 2012, Artell was nominated for League Two Player of the Month, but was beaten to the award by Torquay United's Lee Mansell. On 27 May 2012, Artell captained Crewe to a 2–0 victory against Cheltenham Town in the League Two play-off final at Wembley Stadium, helping to secure their promotion to League One. Despite this, he was released by the club just five days later.

"The young lads come with all sorts of problems about Facebook and Twitter that I haven't got a clue about. But, on football matters, I'm happy to talk to them until the cows come home."

— Artell speaking about his time as captain at the Alexandra Stadium.

=== Port Vale to Northampton Town ===
On 6 July 2012, Artell signed for League Two side Port Vale on a one-year deal, with the option of a second. Upon joining the Valiants, he stated that "...geography had a big part to play in my decision. Promotion possibilities, money, length of contract, they all come into it and Port Vale ticked all those boxes." However, just over a month after his move to Vale Park, Artell departed the club on 11 August, just days prior to the start of the 2012–13 season. Artell had refused to sign a revised contract at the club due to its failure to exit administration. Two days later, on 13 August, he joined fellow League Two outfit Northampton Town. Cobblers boss Aidy Boothroyd said of Artell: "he's the coagulant that will connect the other bits and pieces." His debut for the club came just the day after he had signed; he started, and scored, in a 2–1 League Cup victory over Championship side Cardiff City at Sixfields Stadium. However, Artell's Northampton career effectively ended when he sustained an Achilles injury in October. After he had recovered a few months later, he had lost his first team-place.

=== Wrexham ===
On 26 February 2013, Artell joined Conference Premier side Wrexham on loan for the remainder of the 2012–13 season. On the final day of the season, he was sent off in a 1–0 defeat to former side Mansfield Town at Field Mill. Consequently, he was expected to miss the upcoming play-offs due to his suspension. However, his imposed three-match ban was lifted by a Football Association of Wales disciplinary panel. Artell went onto score in the Red Dragons' 2–1 semi-final first leg victory against Kidderminster Harriers at the Racecourse Ground. Wrexham reached the play-off final at Wembley, but were beaten 2–0 by fellow Welsh side Newport County on 5 May 2013.

In September 2013, Artell's spell at Wrexham became permanent when he signed a 12-month contract with the club. His debut as a permanent Wrexham player came in a 2–0 win against Luton Town on 13 September. He scored his first league goal for the club in a comprehensive 5–2 win over Hyde at Ewen Fields on 28 December. He made a total of 30 appearances in the 2013–14 campaign, helping the club secure safety with a 17th-place finish. He was released at the end of the campaign upon the expiry of his contract.

=== Later career ===
In 2014, following his departure from Wrexham, Artell opted to stay in Wales and signed for Welsh Premier League club Bala Town. He helped steer the Lakesiders to a second-place finish in the 2014–15 season, though they finished a resounding 18 points behind The New Saints. In January 2016, Artell left Bala for fellow Welsh Premier League side Port Talbot Town. The Steelmen were relegated at the end of the 2015–16 season after being rejected a licence by the Welsh FA Club Licensing Appeals Body; this was despite the club finishing one place and 12 points above the relegation zone. In June 2016, Artell signed for Northern Premier League club Kidsgrove Athletic, and scored two goals in cup competitions for the Grove. The final move of his playing career came in November 2016 when he joined Northern Premier League First Division team Droylsden.

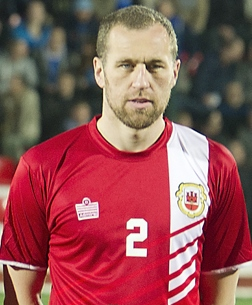
Artell lining up for Gibraltar in 2014

== International career ==
Artell was called up to the Gibraltar national football team in February 2014. He made his debut on 1 March 2014 in Gibraltar's second official match, a 4–1 friendly defeat to the Faroe Islands at the Victoria Stadium.

== Style of play ==
The Football League Paper described Artell as "an archetypal lower-league stopper", and former manager and teammate Jim Bentley said that "he was committed, he was aggressive, he was brave."

== Managerial career ==
In July 2014, Artell became academy operations manager at former club Crewe Alexandra while still playing for Bala Town.

=== Crewe Alexandra ===
On 8 January 2017, Artell was appointed first-team manager by Crewe Alexandra, replacing Steve Davis in the role. One of his first moves was to appoint fellow ex-Crewe player and former Bala Town teammate Kenny Lunt as his assistant manager. On 28 February, with his side facing the possibility of relegation from League Two following a 4–0 defeat at Hartlepool United, Artell publicly warned his players that "relegation means oblivion... they'll end up in the Conference North on £200 a week with a job as a milkman." Crewe promptly won four of their five games in March to climb towards mid-table safety, a run of form that earned Artell a nomination for EFL League Two Manager of the Month. The Railwaymen ended the 2016–17 campaign in 17th place. Artell released six first-team players in the summer, warning the remaining out-of-contract players to sign their new contracts quickly before they too were released, but stated that "we all had a say. It's not a dictatorship. I'm not Idi Amin or Pol Pot... it's evolution, not revolution, but we won't be happy with 17th in the table again next season."

The 2017–18 season, Artell's first full campaign as manager, saw Crewe fare marginally better than the previous season, finishing 15th, largely due to a strong end to the campaign. They had languished in 22nd in November, at which point Artell said: "We have to get out ourselves of the mire. It's win some games, or oblivion." Two months later, he publicly criticised his team's game management after losing two successive games from winning positions – including a 4–3 defeat at Swindon Town in which Artell's side had been 3–1 up. On 20 February 2018, Crewe were beaten 2–1 by Exeter City at Gresty Road despite taking the lead with two minutes of normal time remaining; Artell again publicly criticised his players' professionalism, saying: "That sums us up. Played well, better team, in the lead, snatched defeat from the jaws of victory. That's been us over the course of the season." Following the defeat to Exeter, Crewe's form improved, going onto claim 10 points from a possible 18 to lift them above the 40-point mark by 20 March. On 5 May 2018, with the Railwaymen's League Two safety already secured, Artell selected a starting lineup consisting entirely of academy graduates for their final game of the season at home to Cheltenham Town; Crewe won the game 2–1, earning Artell the EFL Manager of the Week award for his youthful side's victory.

Having ended the previous season by claiming the award, Artell won the first EFL Manager of the Week award of the season after his side began the 2018–19 campaign with a 6–0 opening day thumping of his former club Morecambe on 4 August 2018. Despite this, Crewe went on to struggle for the majority of the first half of the season. However, they showed signs of improvement in January 2019 after recording 10 points from a possible 15, three of which came in an impressive 1–0 win at promotion-chasing Milton Keynes Dons, helping to earn Artell a nomination for Manager of the Month. He admitted he had to come up with better "coping mechanisms" after receiving four yellow cards and one sending off during the season. Reflecting on his team's progress, Artell claimed that it was a "critical statistic" that his side had failed to beat any of the bottom 11 sides away from home. Hoping to improve on their 12th-place finish, Artell released four players, while centre-back George Ray rejected the club's offer of a new contract.

==== Promotion ====
After starting the 2019–20 season with four wins in six games, Artell was again nominated for the EFL League Two Manager of the Month award for August 2019. Crewe were top of the table on 15 March when the EFL was suspended due to the COVID-19 pandemic. Artell said he was "100% confident" that the season would not be scrapped, stating that "The integrity of each competition is important and we have to play the games that are left, whenever that is". He was proven wrong. Clubs voted to end the campaign without playing the remaining fixtures, and although Crewe were promoted, Swindon Town won the league title with a higher points per game. Nonetheless, Artell was selected as League Two Manager of the Year in the League Managers Association Awards, the first Crewe manager to win such an annual award.

In 2020–21, Crewe Alexandra underwent a difficult period off the pitch following publication of the Sheldon report into a sexual abuse scandal relating to multiple offender and former youth team coach Barry Bennell. Artell kept the club performing well on the pitch, signing five new players on free transfers – Offrande Zanzala, Mikael Mandron, Donervon Daniels, Omar Beckles and Luke Murphy – and cashing in on Perry Ng and Harry Pickering. Crewe went on to finish 12th in League One at the end of the season – the club's highest finish since relegation from the Championship in 2005–06.

==== Relegation ====
During the summer of 2021, midfielders Charlie Kirk and Ryan Wintle left; Owen Dale was keen to move and eventually went on loan, and Tom Lowery became involved in a protracted contract dispute. Artell attempted to strengthen the Crewe squad, but two experienced signings (Tommie Hoban and Shaun MacDonald) quickly retired, and Artell had to sign several less experienced players on free transfers and loan deals. Crewe won just one of their first 15 league games and were bottom of the table on 2 November, six points from safety after a draw against fellow strugglers Doncaster Rovers. After Crewe were knocked out of the FA Cup in the first round by Swindon Town, Artell brought in former team-mate Alex Neil as a "fresh pair of eyes" to review Crewe's first-team. However, Crewe continued to struggle, losing seven consecutive games in early 2022 before Artell's 100th victory as manager, a 2–1 win at Cheltenham Town, briefly raised his hopes of an unlikely escape from relegation. Further defeats followed, however, and in March Artell reshuffled his management team, appointing Alex Morris as assistant manager, with Lunt becoming player development manager. In "one of the worst" seasons in Crewe's modern history, the club was relegated with four games still to play after a 2–0 defeat at Doncaster on 9 April 2022. Two days later, on 11 April, Artell was sacked as manager after five years in the role, and was replaced by Alex Morris.

Artell subsequently said he was "unquestionably proud" to be "the only person who has achieved promotion as both a player and manager at Crewe," though it ultimately proved exhausting. Reflecting on his managerial spell at Crewe, Artell said:

"I was doing coaching, recruitment, scouting, loan strategies, transfer strategies, individual development and contract negotiations. Everything you can think of, really, on top of being the manager. I was doing all I could do to look after everyone. My assistant, my coaches, the analyst, the academy manager, the head of coaching, all the way down to the head of the pre-academy; even the tea lady! ... I loved having all that responsibility, and I learned so much from being able to do so much. But, in truth, by the end, I was out of puff."

=== Grimsby Town ===
On 27 November 2023, Artell was appointed head coach of EFL League Two club Grimsby Town on a contract until the end of the 2025–26 season, replacing former Rotherham United teammate Paul Hurst in the role. His first game in charge was a 1–1 draw at Milton Keynes Dons on 28 November, with his first victory coming on 9 December; a 2–1 victory against his former side Crewe Alexandra in his third game in charge. The 2023–24 campaign saw the Mariners finish 21st in League Two, with Artell's side securing safety in their penultimate game.

In the 2024–25 campaign, his first full season in charge of the club, Artell oversaw a significant improvement at Grimsby. In December 2024, after leading his side to four wins out of six, he was nominated for League Two Manager of the Month, ultimately missing out to Walsall's Mat Sadler. The Mariners narrowly missed out on a play–off place following a 1–0 defeat to AFC Wimbledon in their final game of the season. Grimsby finished the season ninth in League Two, 12 places higher than their final position the previous season.

On 7 July 2025, Artell signed a new contract with Grimsby that would see him remain at the club until the end of the 2027–28 season. He said, "I’m absolutely delighted on a personal level. I’m grateful to the owners for showing faith in the work we’re doing. We’ve made great progress, and I hope we can continue this positive trajectory into the new season and beyond." On 27 August 2025, Grimsby defeated Premier League giants Manchester United at Blundell Park in the second round of the EFL Cup. Artell's side were 2–0 up within the first 30 minutes, but were pegged back to a 2–2 draw following two goals late in the second half from the visitors. Grimsby eventually won a marathon penalty shootout 12–11 to record a victory lauded as one of the biggest cup upsets in recent history. They followed the victory up with a 1–0 win at Championship side Sheffield Wednesday in the third round on 16 September, before exiting the competition in the following round with a comprehensive 5–0 defeat to Premier League side Brentford on 28 October. In January 2026, after an impressive month in which Grimsby won four of their five league games, a run during which they kept four successive clean sheets, Artell was again nominated for the League Two Manager of the Month award, but lost out to Cambridge United boss Neil Harris. On 15 February 2026, Artell's side were narrowly knocked out of the FA Cup in the fourth round of the competition with a 1–0 defeat to Premier League strugglers Wolverhampton Wanderers at Blundell Park. He was nominated for March's League Two Manager of the Month award following ten points collected from five games. He was also nominated for April's award after 17 goals and five wins from seven games secured Grimsby a play-off place at the end of the 2025–26 season. Grimsby lost out to Salford City in the play-off semi-finals.

== Managerial style ==
Artell has been fined and given touchline bans by the Football Association for his "expressive and passionate touchline behaviour".

== Personal life ==
In the summer of 2010, he graduated from the University of Chester with a degree in forensic biology, intending to go on to achieve a master's degree. He had previously studied a forensic and analytical science degree course at Sheffield Hallam University.

Artell's father, Greg, died in April 2024. The day after his father's death, however, Artell took charge of Grimsby's 1–0 victory over Newport County. He described the experience as "tough", but thanked the club and the supporters for the "love and support shown to [him]."

== Career statistics ==
=== Club ===
Appearances and goals by club, season and competition
Club	Season	League			National cup (Note: Includes FA Cup, Welsh Cup)		League cup (Note: Includes Football League Cup, Welsh League Cup)		Other		Total	
Club	Season	Division	Apps	Goals	Apps	Goals	Apps	Goals	Apps	Goals	Apps	Goals
Rotherham United	1998–99	Third Division	0	0	0	0	0	0	0	0	0	0
Rotherham United	1999–2000	Third Division	1	0	0	0	0	0	0	0	1	0
Rotherham United	2000–01	Second Division	36	4	3	0	0	0	1 (Note: Appearance(s) in the Football League Trophy.)	0	40	4
Rotherham United	2001–02	First Division	0	0	0	0	0	0	0	0	0	0
Rotherham United	2002–03	First Division	0	0	0	0	0	0	0	0	0	0
Rotherham United	Total		37	4	3	0	0	0	1	0	41	4
Shrewsbury Town (loan)	2002–03	Third Division	28	1	3	0	0	0	5	0	36	1
Mansfield Town	2003–04	Third Division	26	3	4	0	1	0	1	0	32	3
Mansfield Town	2004–05	League Two	19	2	2	0	1	0	1	0	23	2
Mansfield Town	Total		45	5	6	0	2	0	2	0	55	5
Chester City	2005–06	League Two	37	3	4	0	0	0	0	0	41	3
Chester City	2006–07	League Two	43	1	5	0	1	0	1	0	50	1
Chester City	Total		80	4	9	0	1	0	1	0	91	4
Morecambe	2007–08	League Two	36	3	0	0	3	1	5	0	44	4
Morecambe	2008–09	League Two	37	3	2	0	1	0	3	0	43	3
Morecambe	2009–10	League Two	39	8	1	0	1	0	1	0	42	8
Morecambe	Total		112	14	3	0	5	1	9	0	129	15
Crewe Alexandra	2010–11	League Two	40	4	1	0	2	0	1	1	44	5
Crewe Alexandra	2011–12	League Two	32	2	1	0	1	1	4 (Note: 2 appearances in the Football League Trophy and 2 appearances in the play-offs.)	0	38	3
Crewe Alexandra	Total		72	6	2	0	3	1	5	1	82	8
Port Vale	2012–13	League Two	0	0	0	0	0	0	0	0	0	0
Northampton Town	2012–13	League Two	11	3	0	0	2	1	1	0	14	4
Northampton Town	2013–14	League Two	0	0	0	0	0	0	0	0	0	0
Northampton Town	Total		11	3	0	0	2	1	1	0	14	4
Wrexham (loan)	2012–13	Conference Premier	8	0	—		—		3 (Note: Appearances in the play-offs.)	1	11	1
Wrexham	2013–14	Conference Premier	28	2	2	0	0	0	0	0	30	2
Wrexham	Total		36	2	2	0	0	0	3	1	41	3
Bala Town	2014–15	Welsh Premier League	22	1	3	0	0	0	0	0	25	1
Bala Town	2015–16	Welsh Premier League	17	1	1	0	0	0	0	0	18	1
Bala Town	Total		39	2	4	0	0	0	0	0	43	2
Port Talbot Town	2015–16	Welsh Premier League	7	1	—		—		—		7	1
Career total (Note: Statistics for Kidsgrove Athletic and Droylsden not recorded.)			467	42	32	0	13	3	27	2	539	47

=== International career ===
Gibraltar national team
Year	Apps	Goals
2014	6	0
2015	1	0
Total	7	0

== Managerial statistics ==
As of match played 21 November 2026

Managerial record by team and tenure
Team	From	To	Record				
Team	From	To	P	W	D	L	Win %
Crewe Alexandra	8 January 2017	11 April 2022	274	100	51	123	36.5
Grimsby Town	27 November 2023	Present	160	61	41	58	38.1
Total			434	161	92	181	37.1

== Honours ==
=== Playing ===
Rotherham United

- Football League Second Division second-place promotion: 2000–01

Crewe Alexandra

- Football League Two play-offs: 2012

=== Managerial ===
Crewe Alexandra

- EFL League Two second-place promotion: 2019–20

Individual

- EFL League Two Manager of the Year: 2019–20
