= Andy Turner (footballer) =

Irish footballer

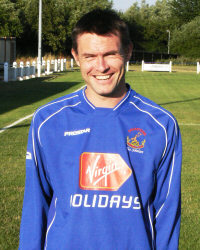
- Turner as a Chasetown player in 2006

Personal information
- Full name: Andrew Peter Turner
- Date of birth: 23 March 1975 (age 51)
- Place of birth: Woolwich, England
- Height: 5 ft 10 in (1.78 m)
- Position: Winger

Team information
- Current team: Hednesford Town (head of youth development)

Youth career
- Tottenham Hotspur

Senior career*
Years	Team	Apps	(Gls)
1992–1996	Tottenham Hotspur	20	(3)
1994	→ Wycombe Wanderers (loan)	4	(0)
1994	→ Doncaster Rovers (loan)	4	(1)
1995	→ Huddersfield Town (loan)	5	(1)
1996	→ Southend United (loan)	6	(0)
1996–1998	Portsmouth	40	(3)
1998–1999	Crystal Palace	2	(0)
1999	Wolverhampton Wanderers	0	(0)
1999–2001	Rotherham United	36	(1)
2000	→ Boston United (loan)	4	(0)
2001	→ Rochdale (loan)	4	(0)
2001–2002	Yeovil Town	21	(1)
2002	→ Nuneaton Borough (loan)	12	(1)
2002	→ Kettering Town (loan)		
2002–2003	Tamworth		
2003	Northampton Town	3	(0)
2003	Northwich Victoria	2	(1)
2003	Moor Green		
2003	Sutton Coldfield Town		
2003	Cinderford Town		
2003–2004	Belper Town		
2004–2005	Banbury United		
2005–2008	Chasetown	26	(3)
Total		189	(15)

International career
- England Schoolboys
1993	Republic of Ireland U21	9	(0)

Managerial career
- 2012–2014: Alsager Town
- 2015–2017: Romulus
- 2018–2019: Alsager Town
- 2019: Bangladesh U19
- 2021–2022: Cefn Druids
- 2024–: Hednesford Town (caretaker)
- * Club domestic league appearances and goals

Andrew Peter Turner (born 23 March 1975) is a football coach and former professional football player and manager. He is currently Head of Youth Development at National League North club Hednesford Town.

Born in England, he represented Ireland at youth team level. A pacey winger, he began his career at Tottenham Hotspur, setting a Premier League record as the division's youngest-ever goalscorer in September 1992. However, he lost his first-team place and was sent out on loan to Wycombe Wanderers, Doncaster Rovers, Huddersfield Town and Southend United. He was sold to Portsmouth for a £250,000 fee in September 1996. He suffered a bad ankle injury at Portsmouth. He was sold to Crystal Palace for £75,000 in October 1998, before moving on to Wolverhampton Wanderers in March 1999. He signed with Rotherham United in June 1999. He helped the club to successive promotions out of the Third Division and Second Division in 1999–2000 and 2000–01. He was loaned out to Boston United and Rochdale before he joined Yeovil Town in June 2001. He was loaned out to Nuneaton Borough and Kettering Town. He helped Kettering to win the Southern League Premier Division title in 2001–02. After spending the 2002–03 season with Tamworth and Northampton Town, he went on to enjoy spells with Northwich Victoria, Moor Green, Sutton Coldfield Town, Cinderford Town, Belper Town, Banbury United and Chasetown. He helped Chasetown to win the Midland Alliance title in 2005–06.

He coached at Wolverhampton Wanderers, Chasetown and Kidsgrove Athletic before he was appointed as manager of Alsager Town in May 2012. He resigned in January 2014 and went on to coach at Coalville Town and Nottingham Forest. He spent 2015 to November 2017 as manager at Romulus, before going on to coach at Shepshed Dynamo and Port Vale. He returned to manage Alsager Town for a second spell in May 2018 before taking a coaching position in Bangladesh 12 months later. He took charge at Welsh club Cefn Druids in October 2021.

== Playing career ==
=== Tottenham Hotspur ===
Turner signed with Tottenham Hotspur after leaving school and recovered well enough from a broken leg to make his first-team debut under the stewardship of Terry Venables on 15 August 1992, starting in a 0–0 draw at Southampton, before he was replaced by Andy Gray on 75 minutes. On 5 September, he set a then-Premier League record as the division's youngest-ever goalscorer, when he scored against Everton at the age of 17 years and 166 days. He went on to score goals against Brentford (in the League Cup), Manchester City and Oldham Athletic to end the 1992–93 season with four goals in 21 appearances, helping "Spurs" to an eighth-place finish and run to the FA Cup semi-finals. However, he fell out of the first-team picture under new manager Osvaldo Ardiles. He featured in just one game in each of his three remaining seasons at White Hart Lane.

"I'm normally a supplier, all I thought when the goal went in was 'good, it takes us up the table' and which way to turn to celebrate."

— Turner speaking in a post-match interview following his record-breaking goal.

On 26 August 1994, Turner joined Second Division side Wycombe Wanderers on a six-week loan and played four times for Martin O'Neill's "Chairboys". On 10 October 1994, he was loaned out to Sammy Chung's Third Division club Doncaster Rovers, and scored two goals in five matches in a two-month stay at Belle Vue. On 28 November 1995, he joined Brian Horton's Huddersfield Town, who were considering signing him permanently if their limited budget would allow it. He scored on his debut against West Bromwich Albion at the Alfred McAlpine Stadium. He played a total of five First Division games for the "Terriers". On 28 March 1996, he was loaned out to Southend United and went on to play six First Division games for Ronnie Whelan's "Shrimpers".

=== Portsmouth ===
On 3 September 1996, Turner was signed by Portsmouth after manager Terry Fenwick paid a £250,000 transfer fee, authorised by chairman Terry Venables. He scored two goals in 27 appearances throughout the 1996–97 season, as "Pompey" posted a seventh-place finish in the First Division. However, Turner dislocated his ankle and tore his ligaments whilst at Fratton Park, and the resulting abnormality in his ankle hampered his career and caused him numerous related injury problems. He featured 18 times in the 1997–98 campaign, scoring one goal, as Portsmouth narrowly avoided relegation.

=== Crystal Palace to Wolves ===
On 23 October 1998, Turner was again signed by Terry Venables, now manager at First Division Crystal Palace; the transfer fee was £75,000. However, he failed to break into the first-team at Selhurst Park, featuring in just two games before dropping out of contention entirely under new manager Steve Coppell. On 24 March 1999, Turner joined Colin Lee's Wolverhampton Wanderers on a free transfer, but never made it onto the pitch at Molineux.

=== Rotherham United ===
On 6 June 1999, Turner signed with Ronnie Moore's Rotherham United on a free transfer. He made 35 appearances for the "Millers" during the 1999–2000 season, scoring one goal, as the club secured promotion as runners-up of the Third Division. However, he lost his first-team place at Millmoor, featuring just four times as United secured a second consecutive promotion in 2000–01. He instead spent loan spells out at Boston United and Rochdale, featuring in four Conference games for Steve Evans's "Pilgrims" and four Third Division games for Steve Parkin's "Dale".

=== Later career ===
On 21 June 2001, Turner signed with Gary Johnson's Conference club Yeovil Town. He played 22 times for the "Glovers" throughout the 2001–02 campaign, though he was not in the matchday squad as Yeovil won the FA Trophy in May 2002. He spent February and March on loan at Conference rivals Nuneaton Borough, scoring one goal in 12 games for Steve Burr's "Boro". He spent the end of the season on loan at Carl Shutt's Kettering Town, who finished as champions of the Southern League Premier Division.

Turner spent the first half of the 2002–03 season with Darron Gee's Southern League Premier Division side Tamworth. He returned to the Football League for the second half of the campaign after being signed by Terry Fenwick, his former manager at Portsmouth. However, Fenwick was soon replaced by Martin Wilkinson. Turner was allowed to leave Sixfields and went on to return to the Conference after signing with Jimmy Quinn's Northwich Victoria. He went on to have brief stays with Moor Green, Sutton Coldfield Town, Cinderford Town, Belper Town and Banbury United. He later joined Chasetown and scored three goals in 23 appearances across the 2005–06 campaign, helping the "Scholars" to the Midland Alliance title. He featured 13 times across the 2006–07 season, helping the "Chase" to a third-place finish in the Southern League Division One Midlands. Remaining as a player-coach for the 2007–08 season, he helped Chasetown to reach the third round of the FA Cup, where they were defeated by Cardiff City.

== Style of play ==
Turner was a pacey winger.

== Coaching career ==
Turner worked as an under-10 coach at the Academy at Wolverhampton Wanderers during the 2007–08 season. He went on to coach at both Chasetown and Kidsgrove Athletic before he was appointed as first-team manager of Alsager Town in May 2012. The "Bullets" finished 15th in the North West Counties Premier League at the end of the 2012–13 season. Turner resigned on 7 January 2014, citing family and personal problems. He took up the post as assistant manager at Northern Premier League Division One South side Coalville Town the following day, a club closer to his home. He then worked as an under-15 coach at the Nottingham Forest Academy from September 2014 to October 2015. He was appointed manager at Romulus in 2015. The "Roms" finished tenth in the Northern Premier League Division One South in 2015–16 and then 13th in 2016–17, before Turner left his post in November 2017. He worked as a coach at Shepshed Dynamo before he was appointed as head coach of Port Vale's Football and Education Academy in April 2018. The following month he also returned to manage Alsager Town for a second spell, who were now in the North West Counties League Division One. Alsager ended the 2018–19 season in 17th-place and Turner went on to leave the club in order to take a position coaching the Bangladesh youth team. Turner joined Cymru Premier club Cefn Druids as Academy Head of Coaching in September 2021. He took interim charge of the first-team the following month after Niall McGuinness's resignation and was replaced by Neil Ashton following the club's relegation at the end of the 2021–22 season.

In August 2024, Turner joined Northern Premier League Division One West club Hednesford Town as head of youth development. He became joint-caretaker manager following the sacking of Steve King on 1 November 2024.

== Personal life ==
His father, Pat, played for Charlton Athletic until he was forced to retire due to injury at the age of 20.

== Career statistics ==
Appearances and goals by club, season and competition
Club	Season	League			FA Cup		Other		Total	
Club	Season	Division	Apps	Goals	Apps	Goals	Apps	Goals	Apps	Goals
Tottenham Hotspur	1992–93	Premier League	18	3	1	0	2	1	21	4
Tottenham Hotspur	1993–94	Premier League	1	0	0	0	0	0	1	0
Tottenham Hotspur	1994–95	Premier League	1	0	0	0	0	0	1	0
Tottenham Hotspur	1995–96	Premier League	0	0	0	0	1	0	1	0
Tottenham Hotspur	Total		20	3	1	0	3	1	24	4
Wycombe Wanderers (loan)	1994–95	Second Division	4	0	0	0	0	0	4	0
Doncaster Rovers (loan)	1994–95	Third Division	4	1	0	0	1	1	5	2
Huddersfield Town (loan)	1995–96	First Division	5	1	0	0	0	0	5	1
Southend United (loan)	1995–96	First Division	6	0	0	0	0	0	6	0
Portsmouth	1996–97	First Division	24	2	0	0	3	0	27	2
Portsmouth	1997–98	First Division	16	1	1	0	1	0	18	1
Portsmouth	Total		40	3	1	0	4	0	45	3
Crystal Palace	1998–99	First Division	2	0	0	0	0	0	2	0
Wolverhampton Wanderers	1998–99	First Division	0	0	0	0	0	0	0	0
Rotherham United	1999–2000	Third Division	32	1	0	0	3	0	35	1
Rotherham United	2000–01	Second Division	4	0	0	0	0	0	4	0
Rotherham United	Total		36	1	0	0	3	0	39	1
Boston United (loan)	2000–01	Conference	4	0	0	0	0	0	4	0
Rochdale (loan)	2000–01	Third Division	4	0	0	0	0	0	4	0
Yeovil Town	2001–02	Conference	21	1	0	0	1	0	22	1
Nuneaton Borough (loan)	2001–02	Conference	12	1	0	0	0	0	12	1
Northampton Town	2002–03	Second Division	3	0	0	0	0	0	3	0
Northwich Victoria	2002–03	Conference	2	1	0	0	0	0	2	1
Chasetown	2005–06	Midland Alliance	17	3	5	0	1	0	23	3
Chasetown	2006–07	Southern League; Division One Midlands	9	0	1	0	3	0	13	0
Chasetown	Total		26	3	6	0	4	0	36	3
Career total			189	15	8	0	16	2	213	17
