= Rhodri Jones (footballer) =

Welsh footballer and television director

Personal information
- Date of birth: January 19, 1982 (age 44)
- Place of birth: Cardiff, Wales
- Positions: Centre-back; midfielder

Youth career
- 1998–2001: Manchester United

Senior career*
Years	Team	Apps	(Gls)
2001–2002	Rotherham United	0	(0)
2002–2004	Cwmbran Town	34	(5)
2004–2006	Carmarthen Town	44	(5)
- * Club domestic league appearances and goals

Rhodri Jones (born 19 January 1982 in Cardiff) is a Welsh former footballer, author and television director. He played as a centre-back and central midfielder and was part of the youth system at Manchester United before joining Rotherham United. After retiring from the professional game through injury, he played in the Welsh Premier League with Cwmbran Town and Carmarthen Town, captaining Carmarthen in the UEFA Cup qualifying rounds. He later became a television director and author.

== Early life ==
Jones was educated at the Welsh language schools of Ysgol y Wern and Ysgol Gyfun Gymraeg Glantaf.

== Football career ==
Jones joined Manchester United's youth system at the age of 16 in July 1998. He did not make a first-team appearance but did play for the club's reserve side. Upon his release in 2001, he moved to Rotherham United. Jones also represented Wales at youth level, making five appearances for the Wales under-18 team during the 1999–2001 UEFA youth qualifying campaigns, including a match against Italy at Penydarren Park in 1999.. A knee injury forced his retirement from professional football in 2002, but he returned to the game in 2003 while studying at Cardiff University, in the Welsh Premier League, firstly with Cwmbran Town, and from 2004, Carmarthen Town, appearing for Cwmbran in the 2003 Welsh Cup final and Carmarthen Town in the 2005 Welsh Cup final defeat. He also skippered Carmarthen in the 2005 UEFA Cup Qualifying Rounds. He retired again due to injury, in 2006. He briefly resumed his career with Carmarthen Town in 2008 before finally retiring in the summer of 2008.

== Post-football career ==
Following his retirement from football, Jones published a Welsh-language autobiographical book Meddwl am Man U. Jones has also worked as a Welsh-language television director, and his credits include Hafiach (2025), Parch (2015) and Pobl y Cwm.

== Career statistics ==
Club	Season	League		Domestic cups		Europe		Total	
Club	Season	Apps	Goals	Apps	Goals	Apps	Goals	Apps	Goals
Rotherham United	2001–02	0	0	0	0	0	0	0	0
Cwmbran Town	2002–03	6	0	0	0	0	0	6	0
Cwmbran Town	2003–04	28	5	1	0	2	0	31	5
Carmarthen Town	2004–05	23	1	11	2	0	0	34	3
Carmarthen Town	2005–06	21	4	5	1	4	0	30	5
Career total		78	10	19	3	7	0	104	13
