= Albert Bennett (footballer) =

English footballer

Personal information
- Date of birth: 16 July 1944
- Place of birth: Chester-le-Street, England
- Date of death: 21 December 2016 (aged 72)
- Place of death: Sprowston, England
- Position: Centre forward

Youth career
- 1959–1961: Chester Moor Juniors

Senior career*
| Years | Team | Apps | (Gls) |
| 1961–1965 | Rotherham United | 121 | (83) |
| 1965–1969 | Newcastle United | 90 | (23) |
| 1969–1971 | Norwich City | 60 | (16) |

International career
| 1964 | England U23 | 1 | (0) |
- * Club domestic league appearances and goals

Albert "Ankles" Bennett (16 July 1944 – 21 December 2016) was a footballer who played for Rotherham, Newcastle and Norwich as a centre forward, in addition to representing England at under-23 level while at Rotherham. He was forced to retire due to injury in 1971 and had a spell as player-manager of Bury Town.

He was born in Chester-le-Street and signed for Rotherham in October 1961. There, he became the only player from that team ever to win England Under-23 honours. He signed for Newcastle in July 1965 for £27,000, making his debut against Blackpool. While at Newcastle he was rugby-tackled by Emlyn Hughes, giving rise to Hughes' nickname of "Crazy Horse". He moved to Norwich in February 1969 for £25,000 to replace Hugh Curran who had transferred to Wolverhampton Wanderers. He scored a hat-trick against Portsmouth at the end of the 1969–70 season.

However, due to injury, he was forced to retire after being substituted against Leicester City in February 1971. He then had a spell as player-manager at Bury, followed by managing various non-league clubs.

Bennett spent his later life living in Norwich, running the Elm Tavern pub in the city.
