= Paul Warne =

English footballer and manager (born 1973)

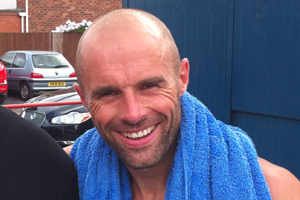
- Warne in 2010

Personal information
- Full name: Paul Warne
- Date of birth: 8 May 1973 (age 53)
- Place of birth: Norwich, Norfolk, England
- Position: Midfielder

Team information
- Current team: Milton Keynes Dons (head coach)

Senior career*
Years	Team	Apps	(Gls)
- Great Yarmouth Town
- Diss Town
1996–1997	Wroxham		
1997–1999	Wigan Athletic	36	(3)
1998	→ Kettering Town (loan)	10	(6)
1999–2005	Rotherham United	232	(28)
2004–2005	→ Mansfield Town (loan)	7	(1)
2005–2007	Oldham Athletic	86	(18)
2007–2009	Yeovil Town	77	(5)
2009–2012	Rotherham United	29	(3)
Total		477	(64)

Managerial career
- 2016–2022: Rotherham United
- 2022–2025: Derby County
- 2025–: Milton Keynes Dons
- * Club domestic league appearances and goals

Paul Warne (born 8 May 1973) is an English professional football manager and former player who is the head coach of EFL League One club Milton Keynes Dons.

Warne started his playing career in his native Norfolk for Great Yarmouth Town, Diss Town and Wroxham. In the summer of 1997, Warne made the transition into full-time Football League football by joining Wigan Athletic, after a spell on loan at Kettering Town in November 1998, Warne would then join Rotherham United in January 1999, where he would spend five-and-a-half-years and help the club gain promotions from the Third Division to the First Division in three seasons. In 2004, Warne had a short loan spell at Mansfield Town. In June 2005, Warne left Rotherham after 257 appearances to join Oldham Athletic, where in two-years Warne would make 100 appearances, in August 2007 Warne joined Yeovil Town, until he left in 2009 to rejoin Rotherham United in 2009, he would retire for football in the summer of 2012.

After retirement from playing, Warne would join the coaching staff at Rotherham United, where he acted as fitness coach, in November 2016 after Kenny Jackett resigned, Warne was named interim manager of Rotherham United until the end of the 2016–17, despite relegation and difficult results during this interim spell, Warne was named full time manager in summer of 2017 and would regain promotion again by winning the 2018 EFL League One play-off final, Rotherham became a yo-yo club under Warne, with club being relegated from the Championship and in 2019 and 2021 and gaining promotion from League One in 2018, 2020 and 2022. Rotherham also won the 2022 EFL Trophy final in this third promotion season. In September 2022, Warne left Rotherham to takeover at League One Derby County as head coach. After falling short of the play-offs by just one point in 2023 and despite the club operating under considerable financial restraints after administration, Warne won promotion in 2023–24 as runners-up. This earned Warne his fourth promotion from League One in his managerial career. With this, Warne became only the 8th Derby County manager to secure a promotion in the club's history and the first since 2006–2007. On 7 February 2025, he was sacked with Derby in the Championship relegation zone and on a run of seven consecutive defeats. On 15 April 2025, with 4 games left of the 2024–25 EFL League Two season, Milton Keynes Dons announced Warne as the new head coach.

== Playing career ==
Warne was born in Norwich, Norfolk, and is a supporter of Norwich City. He started playing non-League football for Great Yarmouth Town, before moving onto Diss Town, with whom he won the FA Vase in 1994. After playing for Wroxham, he started his professional career at the age of 23 when he signed for Wigan Athletic, before moving to Rotherham where he played over 250 games in all competitions, then he moved to Oldham where he became a firm fans favourite in his time there, helping the club to the League One playoffs in the 2006/2007 season, eventually moving on free transfer to Yeovil, where he struggled to get amongst the goals regularly.

During the summer of 2009, after failing to agree a new deal with Yeovil, he joined his former club Rotherham United on trial and impressed pre-season. He subsequently signed a one-year contract with the Millers, scoring on his debut on the opening day against Accrington Stanley. On 11 August 2009, he scored the equalising goal as Rotherham surprisingly beat Championship side Derby County 2–1 in the first round of the League Cup. It was made all the more of an upset by the fact that Derby had reached the semifinals of the competition the previous season. He signed a one-year contract extension in June 2010.

== Coaching career ==
=== Rotherham United ===
Upon his retirement as a player, Warne joined the coaching staff at Rotherham in May 2012 as a first team fitness coach. In November 2012, he was award a testimonial match by the club in honour of his many years of service as a player, coach and caretaker-manager.

After four years in a coaching role, Warne was appointed caretaker manager of the first team on 28 November 2016 following the resignation of Kenny Jackett. On 13 January 2017, he was appointed manager until the end of the 2016–17 season. On 5 April 2017, with Rotherham's relegation from the Championship confirmed, Warne was appointed on a permanent basis with a rolling one-year contract.

During his time as manager, Rotherham, were relegated from and won promotion to the Championship on three occasions each, with promotions in 2018, 2020 and 2022 following relegations in 2017, 2019, and 2021. He also won the 2022 EFL Trophy.

Warne's final game as Millers manager was a 0–0 away to Middlesbrough on 17 September 2022 which left Rotherham eighth in the Championship after nine games; he left the club five days later and dropped down a division to manage League One Derby County.

=== Derby County ===
After interim manager Liam Rosenior was relieved of his duties, EFL League One side Derby County Football Club, recently saved by local businessman David Clowes, approached Rotherham United to request permission to speak to Warne. Paul Warne was officially announced by Derby County as their new head coach on a four-year deal on 22 September 2022, after The Rams agreed a compensation package with Rotherham for Warne, alongside assistant head coach Richie Barker, first team coach Matt Hamshaw, and first team goalkeeper coach Andy Warrington.

Following a stellar January 2023 that saw Derby achieve a 100% win record, Warne was awarded the League One Manager of the Month award for the third time in his career. Form collapsed after this however, and Warne oversaw just six wins in the final 18 games as Derby finished the season in seventh place, the joint lowest league finish in the club history, missing out on a playoff place by one place and point. Warne called the season a "failure".

Warne rebuilt the squad ahead of the 2023–24 season with 12 players signed, with players such as Curtis Davies, David McGoldrick and Jason Knight departing. Derby suffered a bad start to the season, losing their first three games at Pride Park Stadium 2–1 in the league to Wigan Athletic and to Oxford United by the same score, as well as a 2–0 loss to Blackpool in the EFL Cup in between; after this defeat, Warne said that he felt like player's heads were being turned by transfer speculation. Derby suffered a spate of injuries in the first two months of the season and after the first 11 games of the League One season, found themselves in ninth place and ten points behind leaders Portsmouth; Warne said the club were behind their target and demanded improvement from the squad on 11 October 2023. The team subsequently lost 1–0 away to Shrewsbury Town leaving the pre-season promotion favourites 11th in the table and with questions starting to arise regarding Warne's future, though the club later came out in support of the manager. On 14 November 2023, Derby were knocked out of the first round of the FA Cup after a first round replay at home to Crewe Alexandra, the first time the club have been eliminated at this stage since the 1984–85 season, Warne found his team "unpredictable" as they impressed in a league win 3–0 at home to Barnsley three days earlier, Warne called his players for an extra days training on the Thursday after the cup tie. Warne ended 2023 with a nine-game unbeaten league run, winning eight of these matches which moved Derby up to 4th place in the table and two points off the automatic promotion places. This impressive end to the year saw him win the Manager of the Month award for December 2023. In early 2024 Derby found themselves in second place in the table but in February 2024, after Derby's first back-to-back league defeats at Barnsley and at home to Charlton Athletic, Warne warned his players that they needed to improve if they wanted to stay in the automatic promotion places. Derby responded well to this message, with Derby winning their first four league matches in March and after a 1–0 win to promotion rivals Bolton Wanderers, Warne was delighted with the result but told his players not get carried away with Derby being four points clear of third place with seven league games remaining. Having won five from six across the month, he was awarded the Manager of the Month award. Warne achieved his fourth promotion from League One to the Championship after a 2–0 win at home to Carlisle United on the last day of the season confirmed Derby would be promoted as runners-up with their highest ever points tally.

Ahead of the 2024–25 season, Warne released seven first team players from the previous campaign including captain Conor Hourihane, midfielder Korey Smith, whilst first-choice goalkeeper Joe Wildsmith and midfielder Louie Sibley rejected a contract offers. Derby signed 11 players in the summer transfer window, however delays in some of these transfers until after the season started lead Warne to warn that his side was not Championship ready in mid-August after picking up a single win in the club's first three Championship matches, as well as a second round EFL Cup defeat to League Two Barrow. However, on 31 August 2024, Derby beat Bristol City 3–0 at Pride Park with Warne describing it as "the best Derby performance I've seen since I've been here"; this led Derby to gain six points in the first month of the season over four matches. On 7 November 2024, following the dismissal of Mark Robins at Coventry City, Warne became the longest serving active manager in the EFL Championship.

On 7 February 2025, the club released a statement announcing Warne had been relieved of his duties, having lost his last seven games, with Derby sat in 22nd place, just two points from safety. In Warne's final game in charge against Sheffield United, fans began turning against Warne with abusive chants, with Warne comparing the feeling to that of being a "pantomime dame".

=== Milton Keynes Dons ===
On 15 April 2025, Milton Keynes Dons announced the signing of Warne on a 'long-term deal' as head coach, relieving caretaker Ben Gladwin who had taken over in March after the sacking of Scott Lindsey. A press release stated, "This is a significant appointment for MK Dons and demonstrates the club's unwavering ambition to attract a head coach of Paul's calibre while in League Two".

On 8 April 2026, with four games to play, and with the club in the second automatic promotion spot and two points clear of fourth place, Warne was shortlisted as a nominee for the EFL Manager of the Season award for League Two.

Despite not winning the award, in his first full season, Warne went on to win the fifth promotion of his managerial career as Milton Keynes Dons achieved automatic promotion with a second-placed finish on 86 points, missing out on the League Two title on the final day.

== Personal life ==
He is a supporter of Norwich City as well as being a fan of American football team the Pittsburgh Steelers, often referencing the sport in interviews. Shortly after his appointment as head coach of Milton Keynes Dons - known for their controversial relocation and criticised by many as an example of franchising - Warne commented he was pleased at the association due to his interest in the NFL where franchising is more commonplace.

== Career statistics ==
Appearances and goals by club, season and competition
Club	Season	League			FA Cup		League Cup		Other		Total	
Club	Season	Division	Apps	Goals	Apps	Goals	Apps	Goals	Apps	Goals	Apps	Goals
Wigan Athletic	1997–98	Second Division	25	2	0	0	0	0	2 (Note: Appearance(s) in Football League Trophy)	0	27	2
Wigan Athletic	1998–99	Second Division	11	1	1	0	1	0	1	1	14	2
Wigan Athletic	Total		36	3	1	0	1	0	3	1	41	4
Rotherham United	1998–99	Third Division	21	8	—		—		—		21	8
Rotherham United	1999–2000	Third Division	43	10	2	0	2	0	2	0	49	10
Rotherham United	2000–01	Second Division	44	7	3	0	2	0	1	0	50	7
Rotherham United	2001–02	First Division	25	0	2	1	0	0	—		27	1
Rotherham United	2002–03	First Division	40	1	1	0	4	1	—		45	2
Rotherham United	2003–04	First Division	35	1	2	0	3	0	—		40	1
Rotherham United	2004–05	Championship	24	1	0	0	1	0	—		25	1
Rotherham United	Total		232	28	10	1	12	1	3	0	257	30
Mansfield Town (loan)	2004–05	League Two	7	1	—		—		—		7	1
Oldham Athletic	2005–06	League One	40	9	4	1	1	0	1	0	46	10
Oldham Athletic	2006–07	League One	46	9	4	2	1	0	3 (Note: One appearance in Football League Trophy, two in League One play-offs)	0	54	11
Oldham Athletic	Total		86	18	8	3	2	0	4	0	100	21
Yeovil Town	2007–08	League One	33	1	1	0	1	0	2	0	37	1
Yeovil Town	2008–09	League One	44	4	2	0	2	1	1	0	49	5
Yeovil Town	Total		77	5	3	0	3	1	3	0	86	6
Rotherham United	2009–10	League Two	15	2	1	0	1	1	0	0	17	3
Rotherham United	2010–11	League Two	11	1	0	0	1	0	3	0	15	1
Rotherham United	2011–12	League Two	3	0	0	0	0	0	0	0	3	0
Rotherham United	Total		29	3	1	0	2	1	3	0	35	4
Career total			467	58	23	4	20	2	16	1	526	65

== Managerial statistics ==
As of match played 21 November 2026

Managerial record by team and tenure
Team	From	To	Record					Ref.
Team	From	To	P	W	D	L	Win %	Ref.
Rotherham United	28 November 2016	22 September 2022	293	112	65	116	38.2	
Derby County	22 September 2022	7 February 2025	132	60	31	41	45.5	
Milton Keynes Dons	15 April 2025	Present	77	36	25	16	46.8	
Total			502	208	121	173	41.4	

== Honours ==
=== As a player ===
Diss Town

- FA Vase: 1993–94

=== As a manager ===
Rotherham United

- EFL League One runner-up: 2019–20, 2021–22; play-offs: 2018
- EFL Trophy: 2021–22

Derby County

- EFL League One runner-up: 2023–24

Milton Keynes Dons

- EFL League Two runner-up: 2025–26

Individual

- EFL League One Manager of the Month: December 2017, February 2022, January 2023, December 2023, March 2024
