= Leo Fortune-West =

English association football player and manager

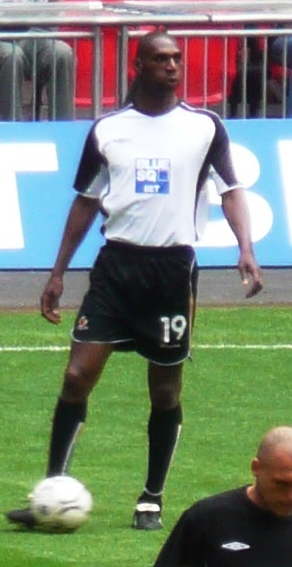
- Fortune-West warming up for Cambridge United before the 2008 Conference Premier play-off final

Personal information
- Full name: Leopold Paul Osborne Fortune-West
- Birth name: Leopold Paul Osborne West
- Date of birth: 9 April 1971 (age 55)
- Place of birth: Stratford, England
- Height: 6 ft 4 in (1.93 m)
- Position: Striker

Senior career*
Years	Team	Apps	(Gls)
1988–1989	Tiptree United		
1989–1992	Bishop's Stortford		
1992	Dartford		
1992–1993	Hendon	18	(6)
1993–1994	Dagenham & Redbridge		
1994–1995	Stevenage Borough	17	(7)
1995–1998	Gillingham	67	(18)
1997	→ Leyton Orient (loan)	3	(0)
1998	Lincoln City	9	(1)
1998	→ Rotherham United (loan)	5	(4)
1998–1999	Brentford	11	(0)
1999–2000	Rotherham United	59	(26)
2000–2003	Cardiff City	92	(23)
2003–2006	Doncaster Rovers	90	(19)
2006–2007	Rushden & Diamonds	6	(0)
2006	→ Torquay United (loan)	5	(0)
2006–2007	→ Shrewsbury Town (loan)	19	(7)
2007–2008	Cambridge United	23	(6)
2008	→ York City (loan)	13	(2)
2008–2009	Alfreton Town	15	(5)
2009	North Ferriby United	2	(0)
2009–2010	Goole		
2010–2013	Armthorpe Welfare		
Total		454	(124)

Managerial career
- 2012–2013: Armthorpe Welfare
- * Club domestic league appearances and goals

Leopold Paul Osborne Fortune-West (born Leopold Paul Osborne West, 9 April 1971) is an English former professional footballer who played as a striker. He played in the Football League for Gillingham, Leyton Orient, Lincoln City, Rotherham United, Brentford, Cardiff City, Doncaster Rovers, Torquay United and Shrewsbury Town.

Fortune-West started his career with Eastern Counties League club Tiptree United, and played for five more non-League clubs before securing a move into the Football League with Gillingham in July 1995. He finished his first season with them as top scorer, and had several short stints with other League clubs before joining Cardiff City, where he played for three seasons. He played for the team as they achieved two promotions, but left on a free transfer.

Fortune-West spent three seasons with Doncaster Rovers, winning promotion in his first, but was released in 2006. He then moved back into non-League football with Rushden & Diamonds, but soon made loan returns to the League with Torquay United and Shrewsbury Town. Fortune-West joined Cambridge United in August 2007 before starting a spell on loan with York City in January 2008. He then had spells further down the pyramid with Alfreton Town, North Ferriby United, Goole and Armthorpe Welfare.

== Early and personal life ==
Fortune-West was born and raised in Stratford, Greater London, and grew up as a supporter of Leyton Orient. He played youth football for Senrab, a London Sunday-league side noted for the high number of former players who went on to play professional football.

His surname at birth was West, but he later appended his mother's surname to his own surname, as he felt that having the word "fortune" in his name would make him lucky. He has two nephews who became professional footballers; Clayton Fortune and Jonathan Fortune. Fortune-West married Radmila Cvijetinovic in Tower Hamlets, London in June 1996, and the couple had a child in 2000.

== Career ==
=== Early career in non-League football ===
Fortune-West started his football career in non-League football with Tiptree United in the Eastern Counties League aged 17, with whom he played one season, filling the roles of full-back, centre-back and striker. He moved onto Bishop's Stortford and joined Dartford in the season they went out of business. A period at Hendon and then Dagenham & Redbridge followed this before he signed for Stevenage Borough in the Football Conference in 1994. He scored 7 goals in 17 league appearances for Stevenage in 1994–95, after which he moved into the Football League with Gillingham on 12 July 1995. The fee of £5,000 was raised for the cash-strapped club by its Supporters' Club. Becoming a full-time professional necessitated giving up a degree course at the University of Greenwich.

=== Football League ===
Fortune-West's first season at Gillingham, 1995–96, saw him score in each of his first three league matches. He was Gillingham's top scorer with 15 goals from 45 appearances, as the club earned promotion to the Second Division as Third Division runners-up. Having made eight appearances and scored three goals for Gillingham during 1996–97, he joined Leyton Orient on loan in March 1997 until the end of the season, making three appearances. He signed for Second Division club Lincoln City on a free transfer in June 1998, and after making 11 appearances and scoring 1 goal, was loaned out to Rotherham United in the Third Division. He scored four goals in five appearances during a one-month loan spell, before Brentford signed him for a £60,000 fee in November 1998. His debut for Brentford came in a 2–1 away defeat to Leyton Orient on 21 November 1998, and scored 1 goal in 15 appearances, before returning to Rotherham for a fee of £35,000 in February 1999.

He scored 8 goals in 17 appearances as Rotherham made the Third Division play-offs, which saw them lose to Leyton Orient in a penalty shoot-out in the semi-final. The 1999–2000 season saw Fortune-West finish as Rotherham's top scorer with 17 goals in 43 appearances, while the club won promotion to the Second Division as Third Division runners-up. After a month into 2000–01, he joined Cardiff City of the Third Division for a fee of £300,000 on 11 September 2000. They earned promotion to the Second Division as Third Division runners-up, and he scored 13 goals from 41 appearances over the season. By the end of the season, Cardiff's rivals Swansea City were believed to be ready to make an attempt at signing Fortune-West. He scored Cardiff's second goal in their play-off semi-final first leg match against Stoke City, which finished as a 2–1 away victory in April 2002. However, after featuring in a 2–0 home defeat in the second leg, Cardiff missed out on making the final, losing 3–2 on aggregate. He finished 2001–02 with 44 appearances and 11 goals. Cardiff qualified for the play-offs in 2002–03 with a sixth-place finish, and were promoted after beating Queens Park Rangers in the final, although Fortune-West was not part of the matchday squad. He was released following this season, in which he made 28 appearances and scored 4 goals.

Bristol Rovers denied that they were interested in signing Fortune-West in June 2003, before Doncaster Rovers of the Third Division signed him on a two-year contract. His first season with the club, 2003–04, saw him score 12 goals in 43 appearances as they won the Third Division championship, earning promotion to the Second Division. During this season, he formed a strike partnership with Gregg Blundell. Fortune-West suffered a knee injury caused by wear and tear to the knee joint in October 2004, which resulted in him undergoing surgery, before returning to the team in March 2005. He was to be offered a new deal in April 2005 and finished the season with 7 goals in 28 appearances. The 2005–06 season was his last with Doncaster, as he was released after scoring 4 goals in 33 appearances.

=== Rushden & Diamonds and Shrewsbury Town ===
He returned into non-League football after he signed for Conference National club Rushden & Diamonds in June 2006 on a two-year contract. He joined Torquay United of League Two on loan in September 2006 as cover for the injured Mickey Evans, but was recalled by Rushden due to an injury crisis in early November 2006. He had made five appearances for Torquay. Days later, he signed for another League Two club, Shrewsbury Town, originally on a two-month loan deal. His Shrewsbury debut came as a 60th-minute substitute in a 2–0 away defeat to Milton Keynes Dons on 18 November 2006, after hoping he would be able to play in the FA Cup tie against Hereford United. The loan was extended to the end of 2006–07 in January 2007. Following Shrewsbury's 2–0 home win over Notts County in February 2007, manager Gary Peters referred to Fortune-West as 'Ronseal', as he does "exactly what it says on the tin". His final appearance for Shrewsbury came in the 2007 League Two play-off final against Bristol Rovers at Wembley Stadium on 26 May 2007, coming on as a substitute in the 80th minute, as Shrewsbury lost 3–1. With the season over, Fortune-West returned to his parent club Rushden, who he left by mutual consent in August 2007.

=== Return to non-League football ===
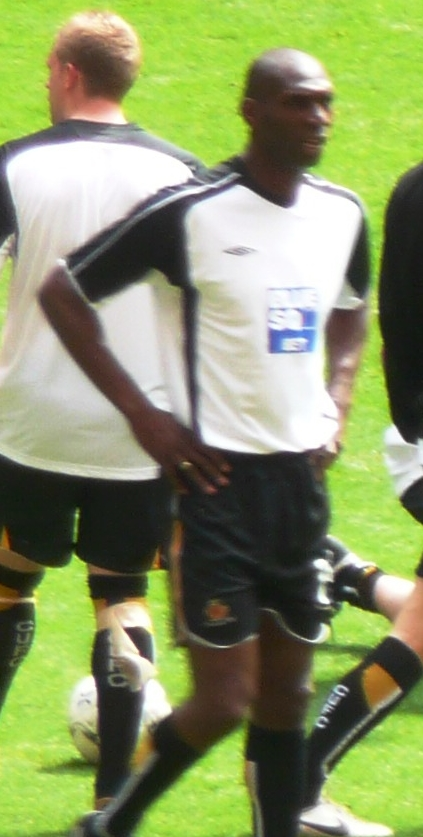
Fortune-West warming up for Cambridge United before the 2008 Conference Premier play-off final

He signed for Conference Premier club Cambridge United in August 2007 after playing for them in a pre-season friendly. He started his Cambridge career by scoring four goals in the first three matches, which included a hat-trick in their 5–1 home victory over Farsley Celtic on 21 August 2007. He was named as the Conference Premier Player of the Month for August 2007. He signed for Conference Premier rivals York City on loan until the end of 2007–08 on 31 January 2008, after which he said he was looking to sign for the club permanently in the summer. He scored on his debut, a 2–0 home win over Grays Athletic after coming on as a 46th-minute substitute for Richard Brodie on 9 February 2008. He started ahead of Brodie in the following matches against Halifax Town and Histon, but struggled during these matches. Cambridge attempted to recall him from his loan in March 2008, but league rules meant that he would not be able to return. He returned to Cambridge following the expiration of his loan spell at York in April 2008, in which he made 13 appearances and scored 2 goals. He featured in Cambridge's play-off semi-final second leg 2–1 home win over Burton Albion; this result meant the team reached the final 4–3 on aggregate. He came on for the last 15 minutes of the final against Exeter City at Wembley Stadium on 18 May 2008, but Cambridge lost 1–0. He was released by the club in May 2008 after making 33 appearances and scoring 8 goals.

On 11 June 2008, Fortune-West joined Conference North club Alfreton Town on a one-year contract for 2008–09. He made his debut in a 3–2 home victory over Hyde United on 9 August 2008 and scored two headers late on in the following match, a 2–2 away draw with Solihull Moors. He scored a 61st-minute equaliser with a close range header at home to Bury Town in the FA Cup first round on 8 November 2008, bringing the score to 2–2, which eventually finished as a 4–2 victory, seeing Alfreton progress to the second round. After struggling to affirm a place in the team, he was released by Alfreton on 28 January 2009. He signed for North Ferriby United of the Northern Premier League Premier Division, and made his debut as a 65th-minute substitute in a 4–0 away defeat to Nantwich Town on 28 February 2009. Fortune-West joined Northern Premier League Division One South club Goole in July 2009, debuting in a 1–1 home draw with Carlton Town on 15 August 2009. In November 2010, he joined Northern Counties East League Premier Division club Armthorpe Welfare. He became player-manager of Armthorpe in May 2012, following the resignation of long-term boss Des Bennett. He resigned from this position on 4 April 2013 before retiring from football.

== Style of play ==
Fortune-West played as a striker and had a "no-nonsense physical style".

== Career statistics ==
Appearances and goals by club, season and competition
Club	Season	League			FA Cup		League Cup		Other		Total	
Club	Season	Division	Apps	Goals	Apps	Goals	Apps	Goals	Apps	Goals	Apps	Goals
Hendon	1992–93	Isthmian League Premier Division	18	6	—		—		3 (Note: One appearance in London Challenge Cup, one in Middlesex Senior Charity Cup, one in Isthmian League Full Members' Cup)	0	21	6
Stevenage Borough	1994–95	Football Conference	17	7			—				17	7
Gillingham	1995–96	Third Division	40	12	3	2	2	1	0	0	45	15
Gillingham	1996–97	Second Division	7	2	0	0	1	1	0	0	8	3
Gillingham	1997–98	Second Division	20	4	1	0	1	0	0	0	22	4
Gillingham	Total		67	18	4	2	4	2	0	0	75	22
Leyton Orient (loan)	1996–97	Third Division	3	0	—		—		—		3	0
Lincoln City	1998–99	Second Division	9	1	0	0	2	0	—		11	1
Rotherham United (loan)	1998–99	Third Division	5	4	—		—		—		5	4
Brentford	1998–99	Third Division	11	0	1	0	—		3 (Note: Appearance(s) in Football League Trophy)	1	15	1
Rotherham United	1998–99	Third Division	15	8	—		—		2 (Note: Appearances in Third Division play-offs)	0	17	8
Rotherham United	1999–2000	Third Division	39	17	2	0	2	0	0	0	43	17
Rotherham United	2000–01	Second Division	5	1	—		2	0	—		7	1
Rotherham United	Total		59	26	2	0	4	0	2	0	67	26
Cardiff City	2000–01	Third Division	37	12	4	1	—		0	0	41	13
Cardiff City	2001–02	Second Division	36	9	4	1	1	0	3 (Note: One appearance in Football League Trophy, two appearances and one goal in Second Division play-offs)	1	44	11
Cardiff City	2002–03	Second Division	19	2	5	1	2	0	2	1	28	4
Cardiff City	Total		92	23	13	3	3	0	5	2	113	28
Doncaster Rovers	2003–04	Third Division	39	11	1	0	2	1	1	0	43	12
Doncaster Rovers	2004–05	League One	24	6	0	0	3	1	1	0	28	7
Doncaster Rovers	2005–06	League One	27	2	1	0	3	0	2	2	33	4
Doncaster Rovers	Total		90	19	2	0	8	2	4	2	104	23
Rushden & Diamonds	2006–07	Conference National	6	0	—		—		—		6	0
Torquay United (loan)	2006–07	League Two	5	0	—		—		1	0	6	0
Shrewsbury Town (loan)	2006–07	League Two	19	7	1	0	—		3 (Note: Appearances in League Two play-offs)	0	23	7
Cambridge United	2007–08	Conference Premier	23	6	5	1	—		5 (Note: Two appearances and one goal in FA Trophy, one appearance in Conference League Cup, two in Conference Premier play-offs)	1	33	8
York City (loan)	2007–08	Conference Premier	13	2	—		—		—		13	2
Alfreton Town	2008–09	Conference North	15	5	4	3	—		2 (Note: One appearance in Conference League Cup, one in FA Trophy)	0	21	8
North Ferriby United	2008–09	Northern Premier League; Premier Division	2	0	—		—		0	0	2	0
Career total			454	124	32	9	21	4	28	6	535	143

== Honours ==
Doncaster Rovers

- Football League Third Division: 2003–04
