= Brian Wilsterman =

Dutch footballer (born 1966)

Personal information
- Full name: Brian Wilsterman
- Date of birth: 19 November 1966 (age 59)
- Place of birth: Paramaribo, Suriname
- Height: 6 ft 3 in (1.91 m)
- Position: Defender

Senior career*
Years	Team	Apps	(Gls)
1986–1988	NEC Nijmegen		
1988–1989	Go Ahead Eagles		
1989–1990	NEC Nijmegen		
1990–1997	Dordrecht		
1997–1998	Oxford United	41	(2)
1999–2001	Rotherham United	52	(4)
- * Club domestic league appearances and goals

Brian Wilsterman (born 19 November 1966) is a Dutch footballer who played in The Football League for Oxford United and Rotherham United.
