= Paul Dillon =

Irish retired footballer

Personal information
- Date of birth: 22 October 1978 (age 48)
- Place of birth: Limerick, Ireland
- Position: Defender

Senior career*
Years	Team	Apps	(Gls)
1996–2001	Rotherham United	75	(2)
2002	Alfreton Town	?	(?)
2004–2006	Maltby Main	?	(?)

International career
- Republic of Ireland U21
- * Club domestic league appearances and goals

Paul Dillon (born 22 October 1978) is an Irish retired soccer-player who played over 100 first-team games in The Soccer-League and other competitions for Rotherham United, and, following a serious injury that derailed his career, Non-League-soccer for Alfreton Town and Maltby Main.

Having come to prominence by excelling in the Kennedy Cup competition for the Limerick District Schoolboy League selection, Dillon was the only Limerick player chosen to play for the Republic of Ireland u-15 team in the 1993/94 season, winning his first international cap against Austria. At this point he was still playing for Geraldines, the famous nursery club in Limerick, where he was renowned for his flying runs up the left flank and his excellent set-piece ability. Dillon was the stand-out player in what was called "The Dream Team", a crack Geraldines side put together in an attempt to win the national (Evans) cup competition (but who lost surprisingly to New Ross, of Wexford, in the last eight. In 1995, Dillon had a successful trial with Rotherham United FC and moved over to England. Despite some tempestuous displays in the reserve team, including a fist-fight with Coventry City's former Benfica star Isiais, Dillon quickly broke into the first team at Millmoor and - by the latter part of the 1996/97 season, he was a regular at left-back in the first team. He scored an outrageous goal from 50 yards against Gillingham which brought him back to the notice of the Ireland scouts. Accordingly, Dillon was included in the Republic of Ireland national under-19 football team for the 1997 UEFA European Under-18 Football Championship finals in Iceland, and played all of the games in that tournament as the first choice at left-back. Dillon also went on to win one cap for the Republic of Ireland under-21 team, playing against the Czech Republic in a friendly in Olomouc in March 1998. Serious injury prevented him from winning any other international caps. Dillon was a first team regular for Rotherham for three and a half seasons, and had attracted notice from scouts of teams at Premiership and Championship level, before serious injury struck and Dillon drifted out of the professional game.

Dillon's potential was recognized by the developers of the famous Championship Manager computer-game. In the 1997/98 version of the game, Paul Dillon was one of the players with most potential. He was regularly included in lists of most valuable players and smartest buys for that version of the game.
