= Marvin Bryan =

English footballer

Personal information
- Full name: Marvin Lee Bryan
- Date of birth: 2 August 1975 (age 51)
- Place of birth: Paddington, England
- Position: Defender

Senior career*
| Years | Team | Apps | (Gls) |
| 1992–1995 | Queens Park Rangers | 35 | (0) |
| 1994 | → Doncaster Rovers (loan) | 5 | (1) |
| 1995–2000 | Blackpool | 184 | (4) |
| 2000 | Bury | 9 | (0) |
| 2000–2003 | Rotherham United | 63 | (0) |
| Total | | 261 | (5) |
- * Club domestic league appearances and goals as of 22:34, 6 September 2007 (UTC)

Marvin Lee Bryan (born 2 August 1975) is an English former professional footballer. He played as a right-back.

Bryan began his career as a trainee with Queen Park Rangers in 1992. He joined Doncaster Rovers on loan in 1994, where he made his first league appearances before joining Blackpool in August 1995. In five years at Bloomfield Road, he made 217 league and cup appearances, scoring four goals.

Bryan joined Bury on a free transfer in March 2000. He spent only three months at Gigg Lane, making nine appearances, before being allowed to move to Rotherham. He made 72 league and cup appearances for Rotherham, but was released by the club in May 2003 after making only 13 starts in the 2002–03 season.
