= Danny Hudson =

English footballer

Personal information
- Date of birth: 25 June 1979 (age 47)
- Place of birth: Mexborough, England
- Height: 5 ft 8 in (1.73 m)
- Position: Midfielder

Senior career*
Years	Team	Apps	(Gls)
1996–2003	Rotherham United	53	(6)
2002–2003	→ Doncaster Rovers (loan)	9	(1)
2003–2004	Halifax Town	28	(0)
2004–2010	Belper Town		
- * Club domestic league appearances and goals

Danny Hudson (born 25 June 1979) is an English footballer who played in The Football League for Rotherham United. He also played non-League football for Doncaster Rovers, Halifax Town and Belper Town. He retired from football to pursue a career as a prison officer.
