= Kevin Watson =

English footballer (born 1974)

Personal information
- Full name: Kevin Edward Watson
- Date of birth: 3 January 1974 (age 52)
- Place of birth: Hackney, England
- Height: 1.83 m (6 ft 0 in)
- Position: Midfielder

Youth career
- ?–1992: Tottenham Hotspur

Senior career*
Years	Team	Apps	(Gls)
1992–1996	Tottenham Hotspur	5	(0)
1994	→ Brentford (loan)	3	(0)
1994	→ Bristol City (loan)	2	(0)
1995	→ Barnet (loan)	13	(0)
1996–1999	Swindon Town	66	(1)
1999–2002	Rotherham United	109	(7)
2001	→ Reading (loan)	6	(0)
2002–2004	Reading	60	(2)
2004–2008	Colchester United	135	(3)
2008	Luton Town	6	(0)
2015–2016	Stevenage	0	(0)
Total		405	(13)

Managerial career
- 2015: Maldon & Tiptree
- 2015–2016: Stevenage (assistant)
- 2016: Eastleigh (assistant)
- 2017: Whitehawk (assistant)
- 2017–2018: Bishop's Stortford
- 2018–2019: Hungerford Town (assistant)
- 2019: Ebbsfleet United (caretaker)
- 2020: Ebbsfleet United
- 2021: Billericay Town
- 2024: Welling United (assistant)
- * Club domestic league appearances and goals

Kevin Edward Watson (born 3 January 1974) is a former professional footballer who played as a midfielder. After his retirement from playing, he became a non-league coach.

== Playing career ==
Watson started his career as a trainee with his local side Tottenham Hotspur. Watson scored his only Spurs goal on his debut in a League Cup tie against Brentford. As a youngster, his first-team opportunities were limited, and he went out on loan to several sides to build his experience, namely Brentford, Bristol City and Barnet.

In 1996, he was signed by Swindon Town manager Steve McMahon. Newly promoted to second tier of the English Football League – Watson helped them avoid relegation.

Watson moved on to Rotherham United in July 1999, astute Millers' manager Ronnie Moore signing him on a free transfer. In his first season, Watson helped Rotherham to promotion from League Two, narrowly missing out on the title.

Another promotion (and another title near miss) followed in the next season, and Rotherham were promoted again into the Football League Championship. A key part of their rapid acceleration, Watson helped guide the team to survival by the narrowest of goal-difference margins.

After over 100 games at Rotherham, his knack for promotions was spotted by then Reading manager Alan Pardew who at first, took Watson on loan before signing him permanently in March 2002 for £150,000 – where he promptly repeated the trick, guiding the Royals to promotion from League One, in his now customary second place.

His first full season at Reading saw the Royals into a play-off place, where narrow defeat to Wolves cost them a place in the Premiership. Watson was on the bench for those key play-off games.

When former teammate Phil Parkinson was installed as manager at Colchester United, one of his first acts was to bring Watson to Layer Road.

Marshaling the midfield, Watson played a key role as in his (and Parkinson's) first full season, and the U's stormed to promotion from League One, finishing in second place.

The U's finished their first season in the Football League Championship in 10th place.

He was released by Colchester at the end of the 2007–08 season, and then signed on a free transfer for Luton Town. However, Watson failed to make an impact at Luton as a result of a knee injury that kept him out of action for much of his contract duration, and he was released at the end of 2008.

In 2015 whilst assistant manager of Stevenage, Watson alongside Stevenage manager Teddy Sheringham registered as players.

== Coaching career ==
After his release from a playing contract at Luton, Watson was given the position of first-team coach by Luton manager Mick Harford on 14 January 2009. After Harford's departure on 1 October 2009, Watson continued in his coaching capacity under new boss Richard Money until May 2010, when he left the club.

Following the departure of Aidy Boothroyd from Colchester United to take the manager's job at Coventry City on 20 May 2010, Watson expressed an interest in taking up the vacant managerial position at his former club.

In May 2015 he was appointed manager of Maldon & Tiptree However, Watson left the club after only eleven days to take up the position of assistant manager to Teddy Sheringham at Stevenage. He left his position in February after Teddy Sheringham's departure. From July 2015 to November 2015, he worked at the academy of Colchester United.

In August 2016, Watson was appointed assistant manager at Eastleigh. In January 2017 he was appointed to the same position at Whitehawk but left the club after just two games, following a change of manager. In March 2017 he was appointed manager of Bishop's Stortford. He left the club at the end of the 2017–18 season.

On 28 June 2018, Watson was appointed assistant manager of Hungerford Town. He left the club on 2 October to join Ebbsfleet United as a first-team coach. However, only eight days later, he was appointed caretaker after manager Gary Hill's departure. After a three-game unbeaten run the club confirmed, that Watson had been appointed to the manager's job on a permanent basis.

The club was beaten in the heaviest defeat in 27 years, 7–0 by Barrow on 4 January and also crashed out of the FA Trophy to lower league opponents Royston. Other heavy losses such as a 4–0 drubbing at Chesterfield away ultimately saw the club relegated out of the National League and Watson sacked.

On 7 January 2021, Watson was announced as the new manager of National League South side Billericay Town.

On 5 October 2021, Watson was sacked by Billericay after Watson led them to one win and one draw from eight matches to start the season.

In January 2024, he joined National League South club Welling United as assistant manager to Rod Stringer.

On 23 March 2025, it was announced that Watson would be taking over as manager of Sheppey United for the 2025/26 season, taking over from the recently deceased Ernie Batten. On 9 February 2026, after a winless run of seven matches, Sheppey United announced that they had parted company with Watson as manager.

== Personal life ==
Watson has been involved in greyhound racing, pairing up with Tottenham Hotspur teammate Stuart Nethercott to buy Elegant Brandy, who won the 1995 Grand National.

== Honours ==
Rotherham United

- Football League Division Three runner-up: 1999–2000
- Football League Division Two runner-up: 2000–01

Reading

- Football League Division Two runner-up: 2001–02

Colchester United

- Football League One runner-up: 2005–06
