= Chris Beech (footballer, born 1975) =

English footballer (born 1975)

Personal information
- Full name: Christopher Beech
- Date of birth: 5 November 1975 (age 50)
- Place of birth: Congleton, England
- Height: 5 ft 10 in (1.78 m)
- Position: Left back

Youth career
- ?–1992: Manchester City

Senior career*
| Years | Team | Apps | (Gls) |
| 1992–1997 | Manchester City | 0 | (0) |
| 1997–1998 | Cardiff City | 46 | (1) |
| 1998–2002 | Rotherham United | 55 | (1) |
| 2002–2004 | Doncaster Rovers | 30 | (0) |
| 2004–2005 | Carlisle United | 2 | (0) |
| Total | | 133 | (1) |
- * Club domestic league appearances and goals

Christopher Beech (born 5 November 1975) is an English former professional footballer.

Beech began his career at Manchester City but failed to make a first team appearance at the Maine Road club. He joined Cardiff City on a free transfer in August 1997 and was first team regular during the 1997–98 season, playing in every league game of the season. However, Beech was one of eleven players released by the club, moving to Rotherham United the following summer and remained with the club until 2002 when he joined Doncaster Rovers of the Conference National. Signed as a replacement for Kevin Sandwith, was part of the club's squad as they won promotion back to the English Football League and remained on their books the following season. He was released at the end of the 2003–04 season to join Carlisle United.
