= Rob Scott (footballer) =

English footballer and manager

Personal information
- Full name: Robert Scott
- Date of birth: 15 August 1973 (age 53)
- Place of birth: Epsom, England
- Position: Defender

Team information
- Current team: Rotherham United (Head of Recruitment)

Senior career*
Years	Team	Apps	(Gls)
1992–1993	Sutton United	?	(?)
1993–1996	Sheffield United	6	(1)
1995	→ Scarborough (loan)	8	(3)
1995	→ Northampton Town	5	(0)
1996–1998	Fulham	81	(16)
1998	→ Carlisle United (loan)	7	(3)
1998–2005	Rotherham United	178	(9)
2005–2006	Oldham Athletic	21	(1)
2006–2007	Macclesfield Town	26	(2)
2007–2008	Halifax Town	6	(0)
Total		338	(35)

Managerial career
- 2008–2009: Ilkeston Town (Joint with Paul Hurst)
- 2009–2011: Boston United (Joint with Paul Hurst)
- 2011–2013: Grimsby Town (Joint with Paul Hurst)
- * Club domestic league appearances and goals

Robert Scott (born 15 August 1973) is an English former professional footballer and manager who currently works as Head of Recruitment for Rotherham United as well as working for The Football Association within their Talent ID Education Department.

As a player, he was a defender from 1992 to 2008, notably in the Football League for Sheffield United, Scarborough, Northampton Town, Fulham, Carlisle United, Rotherham United, Oldham Athletic and Macclesfield Town. He also played in Non-league football for Sutton United and Halifax Town. After retiring from the playing side of the sport in 2008 he became joint manager of Ilkeston Town along with former teammate Paul Hurst. The pair later took over Boston United before joining Grimsby in 2011.

== Playing career ==
As a player, Scott played as a defender from 1992 until 2008, starting his career with Sutton United. He notably played in the Football League for Sheffield United, Northampton Town, Fulham, Rotherham United, Oldham Athletic (where he scored once against Swindon Town) and Macclesfield Town.

He would play anywhere and try his best whether he was right wing or centre forward. He had a great long throw, he was quick and was one of my main players when Fulham got promoted – he also chipped in with useful goals. Rob was a top professional and never gave me any trouble."

— His former boss at Fulham, Micky Adams, speaking in November 2011.

He also played for Scarborough and Carlisle United on loan, and finished his career in 2008 with non-League club Halifax Town.

== Management career ==
=== Ilkeston Town ===
Scott and former Rotherham teammate Paul Hurst were appointed joint managers of Northern Premier League outfit Ilkeston Town in January 2009. The pair led Ilkeston from ninth in the league to second, and ultimately promotion to Conference North via the play-offs. Afterwards, uncertainty surrounded whether or not they would remain at the helm of the Derbyshire club due to the club's worrying financial position.

=== Boston United ===
In May 2009 Scott and Paul Hurst moved to York Street to sign as joint managers of Boston United. In their first season at United they gained a second successive promotion to the Conference North with a win in the play-off final, this was to complete a treble of trophies as they had already collected the Northern Premier League Challenge Cup and Lincolnshire Senior Cup.

=== Grimsby Town ===
On 22 March 2011, both Hurst and Scott resigned from Boston and the following morning they were both announced as the new management team of Grimsby Town, replacing the sacked Neil Woods.

Grimsby who had suffered relegation from the Football League in the previous season had hoped for an instant return but following a mid-season slump that led to the sacking of the previous manager, Hurst and Scott could only manage to salvage an 11th place spot come the end of the 2010–11 campaign. During the summer months the duo bolstered Grimsby's ranks in order for a promotion push, but were hit by a blow as previous season's top scorer and player of the year Alan Connell left to join Swindon Town. The eventual signing of Liam Hearn was a more than suitable replacement as he scored 32 times during the 2011–12 season, a year which saw The Mariners slide away out of the contention of a play-off spot in the final few months of the season. Grimsby, like the year previously finished 11th in the Conference National.

The 2012–13 season started slowly, but by Christmas Grimsby were top of the league and leading a closely contested pack of Newport County, Wrexham and Forest Green Rovers. On 6 January 2013 speculation about the pair's future at Blundell Park came into light when rumours circulated a potential move to Football League One side Doncaster Rovers surfaced. Rovers who had lost manager Dean Saunders earlier that day to Wolverhampton Wanderers were rumoured to have placed Scott and Hurst on their managerial shortlist. The rumour was quashed the following day with Hurst saying that the pair were focused on earning promotion with Grimsby. Grimsby went on to reach the final of the FA Trophy, but were defeated on a penalty shootout after drawing 1–1 with Wrexham at Wembley Stadium. The Mariners, despite leading the Conference for part of the season, dropped off towards the end of the year and had to settle for 4th place, eventually losing to Newport County in the play-off semi-finals. On 6 September 2013, joint manager Rob Scott was suspended due to reasons not revealed by the club, leaving Hurst in sole charge. On 19 September 2013, Grimsby confirmed Scott had been sacked for gross misconduct and that Hurst would remain in sole permanent charge.

== Personal life ==
He is the brother of former Brentford, Rotherham and Aldershot manager Andy Scott.

== Managerial statistics ==
As of 19 September 2013

Team	From	To	Record				
Team	From	To	G	W	D	L	Win %
Ilkeston Town (joint with Paul Hurst)	24 October 2008	2 July 2009	29	18	6	5	62.07
Boston United (joint with Paul Hurst)	2 July 2009	23 March 2011	75	45	16	14	60
Grimsby Town (joint with Paul Hurst)	23 March 2011	19 September 2013	132	59	38	35	44.7
Total			236	122	60	54	51.69

== Honours ==
=== Player ===
Fulham

- Third Division Runner-up (1): 1996–97

Rotherham United

- Third Division Runner-up (1): 1999–00
- Second Division Runner-up (1): 2000–01

=== Joint Manager ===
Ilkeston Town

- Northern Premier League Runner-up (1): 2008–09
- Northern Premier League Play-offs Winners (1): 2008–09

Boston United

- Lincolnshire Senior Cup (1): 2009–10
- Northern Premier League Play-offs Winners (1): 2009–10

Grimsby Town

- Lincolnshire Senior Cup (2): 2011–12, 2012–13
- FA Trophy : Runners-up, 2012–13

=== Individual ===
- Conference National Manager of the Month (1): January 2012
