= Paul Hurst =

English footballer and manager (born 1974)

Personal information
- Full name: Paul Michael Hurst
- Date of birth: 25 September 1974 (age 52)
- Place of birth: Sheffield, England
- Height: 5 ft 5 in (1.65 m)
- Position: Left back

Team information
- Current team: Boston United (manager)

Youth career
- Rotherham United

Senior career*
Years	Team	Apps	(Gls)
1993–2008	Rotherham United	438	(13)
2008	→ Burton Albion (loan)	17	(0)
Total		455	(13)

Managerial career
- 2009: Ilkeston Town (joint)
- 2009–2011: Boston United (joint)
- 2011–2013: Grimsby Town (joint)
- 2013–2016: Grimsby Town
- 2016–2018: Shrewsbury Town
- 2018: Ipswich Town
- 2019–2020: Scunthorpe United
- 2020–2023: Grimsby Town
- 2024: Shrewsbury Town
- 2026–: Boston United
- * Club domestic league appearances and goals

Paul Michael Hurst (born 25 September 1974) is an English football manager and former player who is currently manager of National League club Boston United.

As a player, he was a left back from 1993 to 2008, notably playing his entire career at Rotherham United, bar a brief loan spell with Burton Albion in his final year as a player.

After retiring from the playing side of the sport in 2008, he became joint manager with former teammate Rob Scott at Ilkeston Town, then Boston United, before joining Grimsby Town in 2011. In the 2015–16 National League, he led Grimsby to promotion via the play-offs. Hurst moved on to become manager of Shrewsbury Town in October 2016, and saved the club from relegation from League One in his first season, while taking them to the EFL Trophy and League One play-off finals in 2018.

Hurst left Shrewsbury to join Ipswich Town in May 2018, but was dismissed in October after a poor start to the season. After a spell as Scunthorpe United boss, he returned to Grimsby Town as manager in December 2020. His most recent management spell was back with Shrewsbury where he re-joined in January 2024 before being sacked in November.

== Playing career ==
During his time at Rotherham, Hurst featured regularly on the left side of the back four. He played over 430 league matches for Rotherham United.

He featured in the team that became champions of the Football League Trophy in April 1996, which resulted in a 2–1 win against Shrewsbury Town at Wembley Stadium.

Hurst signed a new two-year contract at Rotherham in 2004, keeping him at the club until June 2006.

On 15 February 2008, Hurst joined Conference National side Burton Albion on a one-month loan to regain his fitness after injury and extended the loan for a second month. He was released by Rotherham after 15 years at the club, at the end of the 2007–08 season. In 2008, Hurst stated that he wanted to return to Rotherham as part of the backroom staff in the future. Hurst had a trial at Mansfield Town but turned down a move before moving into management.

== Management career ==
=== Ilkeston Town ===
Hurst and former Rotherham teammate Rob Scott were appointed joint managers of Northern Premier League Premier Division outfit Ilkeston Town in January 2009 following the departure of David Holdsworth to Mansfield Town. The pair led Ilkeston from 9th in the league to 2nd, and ultimately promotion to the Conference North via the play-offs following a 2–1 victory over Nantwich Town in the final. Afterwards, uncertainty surrounded whether or not they would remain at the helm of the Derbyshire club due to the club's worrying financial position.

=== Boston United ===
In May 2009, Hurst and Scott moved to York Street to sign as joint managers of Boston United. In their first season they gained a second successive promotion to the Conference North at the Horsfall Stadium with a 2–1 play-off final victory over Bradford Park Avenue. This completed a treble of trophies in the 2009–10 season as they had already collected the Northern Premier League Challenge Cup and Lincolnshire Senior Shield.

=== Grimsby Town ===
On 22 March 2011, both Hurst and Scott resigned from Boston. The following morning they were both announced as the new management team of Grimsby Town, replacing the dismissed Neil Woods.

Grimsby, who had suffered relegation from the Football League in the previous season, had hoped for an instant return, but following a mid-season slump this led to the dismissal of the previous manager. Hurst and Scott could only salvage an 11th-place finish at the end of the 2010–11 campaign. During the summer months the duo bolstered Grimsby's ranks in order for a promotion push, but were hit by a blow, as previous season's top scorer and Player of the Year Alan Connell left to join Swindon Town. The eventual signing of Liam Hearn was a suitable replacement as he scored 32 times during the 2011–12 season, a year which saw 'The Mariners' slide away out of contention for a play-off spot in the final few months of the season. Grimsby finished 11th in the Conference National.

The 2012–13 season started slowly but by Christmas, Grimsby were top of the league and leading a closely contested pack of Newport County, Wrexham and Forest Green Rovers. On 6 January 2013, speculation about the future of Hurst and Scott at Blundell Park came into light when rumours circulating a potential move to League One side Doncaster Rovers surfaced, Rovers who had lost manager Dean Saunders earlier that day to Wolverhampton Wanderers were rumoured to have placed Hurst and Scott on their managerial shortlist; the rumour was quashed the following day, with Hurst saying that the pair were focused on earning promotion with Grimsby. Grimsby went on to reach the final of the FA Trophy, but were defeated on a penalty shootout after drawing 1–1 with Wrexham at Wembley Stadium. Despite leading the Conference for part of the season, Grimsby dropped off towards the end of the campaign and had to settle for 4th place, eventually losing to Newport County in the play-off semi-finals.

On 6 September 2013, joint manager Rob Scott was suspended due to reasons not revealed by the club, leaving Hurst in sole charge. On 19 September 2013, Grimsby confirmed Scott had been dismissed for gross misconduct and that Hurst would remain in sole permanent charge. On 7 January 2014, Hurst signed an improved deal reflecting the fact that he was now sole manager.

Hurst oversaw an overhaul of his squad in the 2014–15 season. In his first full season in charge as sole manager, Hurst signed 7 players on free transfers, along with a total of 10 players on short term (4) and long term (6) loans. Grimsby started the season inconsistently, reaching 11th position with 15 matches played, but after much improvement they ended the campaign in 3rd place, six points behind Conference National champions Barnet.

Hurst clinched promotion with Grimsby in their 3–1 victory over Forest Green Rovers in the 2016 National League play-off final at Wembley Stadium, seeing Grimsby promoted to League Two after a six-year absence from the Football League.

Hurst made his League Two managerial debut with the club on 6 August 2016 in the opening match of the 2016–17 season in Grimsby's 2–0 home victory against Morecambe; the performance led to Hurst winning the Sky Bet EFL Manager of the Week award.

=== Shrewsbury Town ===
On 24 October 2016, Shrewsbury Town announced that Hurst and Chris Doig were to take over the manager and assistant manager roles at the club following the departure of Micky Mellon to Tranmere Rovers. Hurst was tasked with steering the club clear from the relegation places, with Shrewsbury sitting bottom of the League One table. His first match in charge was a 1−1 draw away at Southend United, ending a run of four consecutive defeats. A week later, Hurst picked up his first victory as Shrewsbury manager, defeating League Two side Barnet 3−0 in the FA Cup first round at New Meadow in his second match in charge. A point earned in a 1−1 draw away at Swindon Town lifted the club out of the League One relegation places, albeit on goal difference only, for the first time since Hurst was appointed on 7 January 2017. Shrewsbury finished the campaign in 18th place, three places and two points clear of the final relegation place occupied by local rivals Port Vale.

In the 2017–18 season, Shrewsbury reached the EFL Trophy final at Wembley but lost to Lincoln City. In the league, Hurst led Shrewsbury to a 3rd place finish in League One. However, Shrewsbury lost 2–1 after extra time to Rotherham United in the play-off final.

=== Ipswich Town ===
On 30 May 2018, Hurst was announced as manager of Ipswich Town. Hurst and his assistant Chris Doig signed three-year contracts. Upon his appointment, Hurst was keen to stress that he could work within Ipswich's £3m transfer budget as outlined in the owner's five point plan, and the club's wage bill which was the sixth lowest in the English Championship. Under Hurst, Ipswich made a very poor start to the season, winning just one of their opening 14 games and losing on penalties to League Two side Exeter City in the EFL Cup. Hurst was dismissed on 25 October 2018 following a 2–0 defeat at Leeds United with Ipswich bottom of the table. He had been in charge for just under five months, the shortest reign of any manager in the club's history.

=== Scunthorpe United ===
On 13 May 2019, Hurst was announced as manager of Scunthorpe United. Hurst was dismissed by Scunthorpe on 29 January 2020 after eight months in charge. Scunthorpe chairman Peter Swann said Hurst was dismissed because of non-footballing reasons and that the relationship between himself and Hurst had broken down.

=== Return to Grimsby Town ===
On 30 December 2020, Hurst and Chris Doig returned to Grimsby, signing 30 month contracts until June 2023 and replacing Ian Holloway who had resigned seven days earlier amid talks of a potential takeover at the club.

Following off the field controversies that led to the departure of Holloway and majority shareholder John Fenty, Hurst could not save Grimsby from relegation and the club finished bottom of League Two ending a five-year spell following their last promotion under Hurst in 2016. Grimsby club legend John McDermott in an interview laid the blame with the outgoing regime, stating "You can't blame Paul, and you can't blame the players now. Watching the games, they've had a go, but he's been given a gun with about two bullets in it. How can you fight that?"

Hurst was awarded the National League Manager of the Month award for April 2022 after four wins from five across the month, boosting the club's play-off ambitions. Grimsby were promoted back to the Football League at the first attempt, with Hurst's side navigating a play-off campaign that saw them beat all three opponents in extra time, beating Notts County 2–1 at Meadow Lane in the eliminator before a 5–4 semi-final victory away at Wrexham. In the 2022 National League play-off final at the London Stadium, the Mariners defeated Solihull Moors 2–1.

In the 2022–23 season, Grimsby advanced to the quarter-finals of the FA Cup for the first time since 1939 by beating Premier League side Southampton 2–1 away from home, becoming the first club in the competition's history to knock out five teams from a higher division.

On 28 October 2023, following four consecutive defeats, Hurst was dismissed by Grimsby with the club in 21st place.

=== Return to Shrewsbury Town ===
On 24 January 2024, Shrewsbury Town confirmed the reappointment of Hurst as head coach. He was dismissed on 3 November 2024 after making a disappointing start to the 2024-25 season, winning just two of 19 games.

=== Return to Boston United ===
On 14 January 2026, Hurst was reappointed manager of National League club Boston United.

== Broadcasting career ==
In the summer of 2008, Hurst graduated from Staffordshire University with a degree in Professional Sports Writing and Broadcasting.

Hurst worked for Rotherham United's Community Sports Trust as participation officer.

== Personal life ==
Hurst previously worked as a professional support assistant at Rawmarsh Community School in 2010, combining this with his role as joint manager of Boston United. Hurst completed his UEFA 'A' Coaching Licence in January 2014, which is widely regarded as one of the highest coaching qualifications in the game. He is married to Melanie and has a daughter Millie and a son Zack.

== Managerial statistics ==
As of match played 21 November 2026

Managerial record by team and tenure
Team	From	To	Record					Ref.
Team	From	To	P	W	D	L	Win %	Ref.
Ilkeston Town (joint)	15 January 2009	14 May 2009	29	18	6	5	62.1	
Boston United (joint)	14 May 2009	22 March 2011	75	45	16	14	60.0	
Grimsby Town	23 March 2011	24 October 2016	314	149	84	81	47.5	
Shrewsbury Town	24 October 2016	30 May 2018	97	47	23	27	48.5	
Ipswich Town	30 May 2018	25 October 2018	15	1	7	7	6.7	
Scunthorpe United	13 May 2019	29 January 2020	38	12	10	16	31.6	
Grimsby Town	30 December 2020	28 October 2023	154	58	37	59	37.7	
Shrewsbury Town	24 January 2024	3 November 2024	37	6	9	22	16.2	
Boston United	14 January 2026	Present	42	15	9	18	35.7	
Total			800	351	202	247	43.9	

== Honours ==
=== As a player ===
Rotherham United

- Football League Second Division second-place promotion: 2000–01
- Football League Third Division second-place promotion: 1999–2000
- Football League Trophy: 1995–96

=== As a joint manager ===
Ilkeston Town F.C. (1945)

- Northern Premier League Premier Division play-offs: 2009

Boston United

- Northern Premier League Premier Division play-offs: 2010
- Northern Premier League Challenge Cup: 2009–10
- Lincolnshire Senior Shield: 2009–10

Grimsby Town

- FA Trophy runner-up: 2012–13
- Lincolnshire Senior Cup: 2011–12, 2012–13

=== As a manager ===
Grimsby Town

- National League play-offs: 2016, 2022
- FA Trophy runner-up: 2015–16

Shrewsbury Town

- EFL Trophy runner-up: 2017–18

'Individual

- EFL League One Manager of the Year: 2017–18
- EFL League One Manager of the Month: September 2017
- Conference Premier Manager of the Month: January 2012, November 2013, October 2014, March 2015
- National League Manager of the Month: November 2015, April 2022
