= 1996–97 Rotherham United F.C. season =

Rotherham United
1996–97 season
- Chairman: Ken Booth
- Manager: Danny Bergara
- Stadium: Millmoor
- Second Division: 23rd (relegated)
- FA Cup: First round
- League Cup: First round
- Football League Trophy: First round
- Top goalscorer: Jean (6)
- Average home league attendance: 2,861
- Biggest win: 2–0
- Biggest defeat: 2–6
Home colours

During the 1996–97 English football season, Rotherham United F.C. competed in the Football League Second Division.

== Season summary ==
In the 1996–97 season, Danny Bergara in the summer became Rotherham's next manager, but was given little time to turn the club’s fortunes. Rotherham endured a poor season and were relegated, and Bergara lost his job at the club.

== Final league table ==
Pos	Team	Pld	W	D	L	GF	GA	GD	Pts	Promotion or relegation
20	York City	46	13	13	20	47	68	−21	52	
21	Peterborough United (R)	46	11	14	21	55	73	−18	47	Relegation to the Third Division
22	Shrewsbury Town (R)	46	11	13	22	49	74	−25	46	Relegation to the Third Division
23	Rotherham United (R)	46	7	14	25	39	70	−31	35	Relegation to the Third Division
24	Notts County (R)	46	7	14	25	33	59	−26	35	Relegation to the Third Division

Rules for classification: In the Football League goals scored (GF) takes precedence over goal difference (GD).
(R) Relegated

== Results ==
Rotherham United's score comes first

=== Legend ===
Win	Draw	Loss

=== Football League Second Division ===
Date	Opponent	Venue	Result	Attendance	Scorers
17 August 1996	Walsall	A	1–1	4,040	Goodwin
24 August 1996	Shrewsbury Town	H	1–2	3,037	McDougald
27 August 1996	Blackpool	H	1–2	2,914	Hayward
31 August 1996	Luton Town	A	0–1	4,547	
7 September 1996	Bury	A	1–3	3,523	Hurst
10 September 1996	Chesterfield	H	0–1	2,940	
14 September 1996	Bristol City	H	2–2	2,546	Berry, Richardson (pen)
21 September 1996	Gillingham	A	1–3	4,920	Bowyer
28 September 1996	Bournemouth	H	1–0	2,648	Druce
1 October 1996	Wycombe Wanderers	A	2–4	3,438	Druce, Hayward
5 October 1996	Brentford	A	2–4	6,137	Berry, Druce
12 October 1996	Burnley	H	1–0	4,562	Druce
15 October 1996	Bristol Rovers	H	0–0	2,490	
19 October 1996	York City	A	1–2	3,410	Sandeman
26 October 1996	Peterborough United	H	2–0	2,854	Breckin, Berry
29 October 1996	Crewe Alexandra	A	0–1	3,162	
2 November 1996	Preston North End	A	0–0	8,997	
9 November 1996	Watford	H	0–0	3,619	
23 November 1996	Millwall	H	0–0	3,286	
30 November 1996	Peterborough United	A	2–6	4,690	Blades, Sandeman
3 December 1996	Stockport County	H	0–1	2,133	
14 December 1996	Notts County	A	0–0	3,954	
21 December 1996	Plymouth Argyle	H	1–2	2,269	Breckin
28 December 1996	Bury	H	1–1	3,263	Goodwin (pen)
11 January 1997	Bournemouth	A	1–1	3,161	Hurst
18 January 1997	Wycombe Wanderers	H	2–1	2,692	Goodwin (pen), Glover
25 January 1997	Crewe Alexandra	H	1–4	2,832	Jean
1 February 1997	Watford	A	0–2	10,657	
8 February 1997	Preston North End	H	0–1	3,556	
15 February 1997	Millwall	A	0–2	7,043	
18 February 1997	Chesterfield	A	1–1	5,195	Hayward
22 February 1997	Wrexham	H	0–0	2,539	
1 March 1997	Stockport County	A	0–0	6,147	
8 March 1997	Plymouth Argyle	A	0–1	4,717	
15 March 1997	Notts County	H	2–2	2,605	Jean, Bowyer
18 March 1997	Bristol City	A	2–0	10,646	Garner, Jean
22 March 1997	Shrewsbury Town	A	2–0	2,893	McDougald (pen), Hurst
25 March 1997	Gillingham	H	1–2	2,664	Dillon
29 March 1997	Walsall	H	1–2	2,428	Hayward
31 March 1997	Blackpool	A	1–4	5,524	Breckin
5 April 1997	Luton Town	H	0–3	2,609	
8 April 1997	Wrexham	A	0–1	2,002	
11 April 1997	Brentford	H	0–1	1,797	
19 April 1997	Burnley	A	3–3	7,875	Jean (3)
26 April 1997	York City	H	0–2	3,122	
3 May 1997	Bristol Rovers	A	2–1	5,950	Berry, Garner

=== FA Cup ===
Round	Date	Opponent	Venue	Result	Attendance	Goalscorers
R1	16 November 1996	Scunthorpe United	A	1–4	3,892	McGlashan

=== League Cup ===
Round	Date	Opponent	Venue	Result	Attendance	Goalscorers
First round first leg	20 August 1996	Darlington	A	0–1	2,023	
First round second leg	3 September 1996	Darlington	H	0–1 (Note: Rotherham United lost 2–0 on aggregate)	1,749	

=== Football League Trophy ===
Round	Date	Opponent	Venue	Result	Attendance	Goalscorers
NR1	10 December 1996	Blackpool	H	0–1 (a.e.t.)	1,143	

== Squad ==
Note: Flags indicate national team as defined under FIFA eligibility rules; some limited exceptions apply. Players may hold more than one non-FIFA nationality.

No.	Pos.	Nation	Player
—	GK	ENG	Phil Barnes
—	GK	ENG	Steve Cherry
—	GK	ENG	Steve Farrelly
—	GK	ENG	Kevin Pilkington (on loan from Manchester United)
—	DF	SCO	Kevin Bain
—	DF	ENG	Paul Blades
—	DF	ENG	Gary Bowyer
—	DF	ENG	Ian Breckin
—	DF	IRL	Paul Dillon
—	DF	ENG	Dean Fearon
—	DF	ENG	Brian Gayle
—	DF	ENG	Paul Hurst
—	DF	ENG	Martin James
—	DF	ENG	Mark Monington
—	DF	ENG	Neil Richardson
—	DF	ENG	Bradley Sandeman
—	DF	NZL	Scott Smith
—	MF	ENG	Trevor Berry

No.	Pos.	Nation	Player
—	MF	ENG	Adrian Clarke (on loan from Arsenal)
—	MF	IRL	Jim Crawford (on loan from Newcastle United)
—	MF	SCO	Jim Dobbin
—	MF	ENG	Darren Garner
—	MF	ENG	Shaun Goodwin
—	MF	ENG	Danny Hudson
—	MF	SCO	John McGlashan
—	MF	ENG	Rob McKenzie
—	MF	ENG	Andy Roscoe
—	FW	ENG	Rob Bowman
—	FW	ENG	Mark Druce
—	FW	ENG	Lee Glover
—	FW	ENG	Andy Hayward
—	FW	LCA	Earl Jean
—	FW	ENG	Richard Landon (on loan from Stockport County)
—	FW	ENG	Junior McDougald
—	FW	ENG	Robert Pell
—	FW	ENG	Steve Slawson
