= 1996 Football League Trophy final =

1996 Football League Trophy Final
- Event: 1995–96 Football League Trophy
Rotherham United	Shrewsbury Town
2	1
- Date: 14 April 1996
- Venue: Wembley, London
- Man of the Match: Nigel Jemson
- Referee: David Allison (Lancaster)
- Attendance: 35,235

The 1996 Football League Trophy Final (known as the Auto Windscreens Shields Trophy for sponsorship reasons) was the 13th final of the domestic football cup competition for teams from the Second and Third Division of the Football League. The match was played at Wembley on 14 April 1996, and was contested by Rotherham United and Shrewsbury Town. Rotherham United won the match 2–1, with Nigel Jemson scoring both goals for the winning team.

== Match details ==
14 April 1996

Rotherham United	2–1	Shrewsbury Town
Jemson 20', 58'	Report	Taylor 81'

Wembley, London
Attendance: 35,235
Referee: David Allison (Lancaster)

GK	Matt Clarke
DF	Paul Hurst
DF	Ian Breckin	Yellow card
DF	Neil Richardson
DF	Paul Blades
MF	Andy Roscoe
MF	Shaun Goodwin
MF	Darren Garner
MF	Trevor Berry
FW	Nigel Jemson
FW	Shaun Goater
Substitutes:
DF	Gary Bowyer
MF	Andy Hayward
MF	John McGlashan
Manager:
Archie Gemmill & John McGovern

GK	Paul Edwards
DF	Chris Withe	Yellow card
DF	Dave Walton
DF	Peter Whiston
DF	John Kay
MF	Mark Taylor
MF	Richard Scott	Yellow card
MF	Carl Robinson	(substituted off) 75'
MF	Austin Berkley
FW	Ian Stevens
FW	Dean Spink	(substituted off) 45'
Substitute:
GK	Tim Clarke
DF	Tommy Lynch	(substituted on) 75'
FW	Steve Anthrobus	(substituted on) 45'
Manager:
Fred Davies

MATCH RULES

- 90 minutes.
- 30 minutes of extra-time if necessary.
- Penalty shoot-out if scores still level.
- Maximum of 3 substitutions.
