= List of Shrewsbury Town F.C. players =

This is a list of notable footballers who have played for Shrewsbury Town. Generally, this means players that have played a significant number of first-class matches for the club. Other players who have played an important role for the club can be included, but the reason why they have been included should be added in the 'Notes' column.

For a list of all Shrewsbury Town players, major or minor, with a Wikipedia article, see Category:Shrewsbury Town F.C. players, and for the current squad see the main Shrewsbury Town F.C. article.

== Players with over 100 appearances for Shrewsbury Town ==
Total caps and goals are for all senior competitions (including substitute appearances) in the Football League, Football League play-offs, Football League Cup, FA Cup, Welsh Cup and Football League Trophy.

Updated 22 November 2025.

Name	Nationality	Position	Years	League Apps	League Goals	Total Apps	Total Goals	Notes
Sam Aiston	England	MF	1999−2005	177	7	191	7	
George Andrews	England	FW	1970−1973	124	49	?	?	
Neil Ashton	England	DF	2004−2009	160	3	178	3	
Ian Atkins	England	DF	1975−1982	279	55	?	?	
Jim Bannister	England	DF	1952−1958	238	6	?	?	
Chic Bates	England	FW	1974−1978, 1980−1986	294	64	343	76	
Eric Brodie	Scotland	MF	1963−1968	185	24	?	?	
Junior Brown	England	DF	2015−2018	89	6	108	7	
Mickey Brown	England	MF	1986−1991, 1992−1994, 1997−2001	418	36	482	40	
Shane Cansdell-Sherriff	Australia	DF	2008−2012	150	9	163	11	
James Collins	Republic of Ireland	FW	2011−2012, 2014−2016	134	42	154	48	
Ron Crutchley	England	MF	1950−1954	146	1	?	?	
Ben Davies	England	MF	2006−2009	115	30	127	31	
Ian Dunbavin	England	GK	2000−2004	99	0	115	0	
Alan Durban	Wales	FW	1973−1978	156	33	174	35	
David Edwards	Wales	MF	2003−2007	118	12	132	15	
Paul Edwards	England	GK	1992−2001	313	0	364	0	
Connor Goldson	England	DF	2010−2015	106	8	120	8	
Jermaine Grandison	England	DF	2011−2016	150	5	174	5	
Ben Herd	England	DF	2005−2009	143	3	163	3	
David Hibbert	England	FW	2007−2010	104	29	111	30	
Norman Hobson	England	DF	1954−1962	212	5	224	6	
Joe Jacobson	Wales	DF	2011−2014	110	7	119	7	
Steve Jagielka	England	MF	1997−2003	175	18	197	20	
Nigel Jemson	England	FW	2000−2003	109	36	127	43	
Kelvin Langmead	England	DF/FW	2004−2010	234	19	257	19	
Steve Leslie	Scotland	MF	2006−2012	103	7	120	10	
Jayson Leutwiler	Canada	GK	2014−2017	118	0	140	0	
Ryan Lowe	England	MF	2000−2005	173	32	194	37	
Tommy Lynch	Republic of Ireland	DF	1990−1997	234	14	282	16	
Kevin McIntyre	England	MF	2008−2011	127	5	140	7	
Darren Moss	Wales	DF	2001−2005, 2007−2009	200	12	224	13	
Abu Ogogo	England	MF	2015−2018	103	4	124	5	
Matt Redmile	England	DF	2001−2003	107	6	112	6	
Luke Rodgers	England	FW	1999−2005, 2012−2013	194	69	219	75	
Mat Sadler	England	DF	2010−2011, 2015−2019	134	5	161	6	
Jordan Shipley	England	MF	2022–2025	111	12	135	16	
Dean Spink	England	FW/DF	1990−1997, 1999	294	55	342	63	
Lee Steele	England	FW	1997−2000	115	38	128	41	
Ian Stevens	England	FW	1994−1997, 2002−2003	130	39	156	51	
Kevin Summerfield	England	MF	1990−1996	163	22	198	30	
Jon Taylor	England	MF	2010−2014	133	21	143	21	
Mark Taylor	England	MF	1991−1998	249	13	298	16	
Jamie Tolley	Wales	MF	1999−2006	184	17	209	20	
Andrew Tretton	England	DF	1997−2002	113	6	121	6	
Daniel Udoh	England	FW	2019–2024	155	31	181	38	
Shaun Whalley	England	MF	2015−2022	214	34	255	40	
Peter Wilding	England	DF	1997−2003	194	7	218	11	
Ryan Woods	England	MF	2012−2015	91	1	103	1	
Mark Wright	England	MF	2010−2013	108	25	122	26	
