= 1996–97 Shrewsbury Town F.C. season =

Shrewsbury Town
1996–97 season
- Chairman: Roland Wycherley
- Manager: Fred Davies
- Stadium: Gay Meadow
- Second Division: 22nd (relegated)
- FA Cup: First round
- League Cup: First round
- League Trophy: Northern semi-finals
- Top goalscorer: League: Ian Stevens (17); All: Ian Stevens (18)
- Biggest win: 3–1 / 2–0
- Biggest defeat: 1–5

During the 1996–97 English football season, Shrewsbury Town F.C. competed in the Football League Second Division.

== Season summary ==
In the 1996–97 season, Shrewsbury endured a poor campaign and were relegated to the Third Division which ultimately cost manager Davies his job.

== Final league table ==
Pos	Team	Pld	W	D	L	GF	GA	GD	Pts	Promotion or relegation
20	York City	46	13	13	20	47	68	−21	52	
21	Peterborough United (R)	46	11	14	21	55	73	−18	47	Relegation to the Third Division
22	Shrewsbury Town (R)	46	11	13	22	49	74	−25	46	Relegation to the Third Division
23	Rotherham United (R)	46	7	14	25	39	70	−31	35	Relegation to the Third Division
24	Notts County (R)	46	7	14	25	33	59	−26	35	Relegation to the Third Division

Rules for classification: In the Football League goals scored (GF) takes precedence over goal difference (GD).
(R) Relegated

== Results ==
Shrewsbury Town's score comes first

=== Legend ===
Win	Draw	Loss

=== Football League Second Division ===
Date	Opponent	Venue	Result	Attendance	Scorers
18 August 1996	Wycombe Wanderers	H	1–1	3,440	Stevens
24 August 1996	Rotherham United	A	2–1	3,037	Stevens (2)
27 August 1996	Burnley	A	3–1	9,072	Taylor, Scott, Stevens
31 August 1996	Brentford	H	0–3	3,530	
7 September 1996	York City	A	0–0	2,911	
10 September 1996	Bristol City	H	1–0	2,502	Stevens
14 September 1996	Bury	H	1–1	3,238	Rowbotham
21 September 1996	Blackpool	A	1–1	4,452	Stevens
28 September 1996	Watford	H	1–0	3,655	Evans
1 October 1996	Chesterfield	A	1–2	3,299	Dyche (own goal)
8 October 1996	Wrexham	A	1–2	5,031	Evans
12 October 1996	Luton Town	H	0–3	3,357	
15 October 1996	Gillingham	H	1–2	2,042	Currie
19 October 1996	Preston North End	A	1–2	8,333	Stevens
26 October 1996	Crewe Alexandra	H	0–1	3,878	
29 October 1996	Peterborough United	A	2–2	5,400	Bennett (2)
2 November 1996	Notts County	A	2–1	4,363	Stevens, Bennett
12 November 1996	Bristol Rovers	H	2–0	2,331	Stevens, Spink
20 November 1996	Millwall	A	1–2	5,770	Stevens
23 November 1996	Stockport County	H	3–2	2,865	Stevens, Anthrobus, Evans
30 November 1996	Crewe Alexandra	A	1–5	4,035	Stevens
3 December 1996	Bournemouth	H	1–1	1,610	Anthrobus
14 December 1996	Plymouth Argyle	A	2–2	5,075	Spink, Evans
20 December 1996	Walsall	H	2–2	3,007	Anthrobus, Stevens
26 December 1996	Bristol City	A	2–3	9,803	Stevens, Nielsen
28 December 1996	York City	H	2–0	3,189	Evans, Stevens
1 January 1997	Blackpool	H	1–3	2,787	Ward
18 January 1997	Chesterfield	H	2–0	2,659	Brown, Evans (pen)
25 January 1997	Peterborough United	H	2–2	2,695	Bodley (own goal), Anthrobus
1 February 1997	Bristol Rovers	A	0–2	4,924	
8 February 1997	Notts County	H	2–1	2,692	Spink, Stevens
15 February 1997	Stockport County	A	1–3	6,712	Whiston
22 February 1997	Millwall	H	1–1	2,968	Anthrobus
25 February 1997	Watford	A	0–2	6,378	
1 March 1997	Bournemouth	A	0–0	5,810	
4 March 1997	Bury	A	0–2	2,690	
8 March 1997	Walsall	A	2–2	4,819	Currie, Walton
15 March 1997	Plymouth Argyle	H	2–3	3,414	Anthrobus, Stevens
22 March 1997	Rotherham United	H	0–2	2,893	
29 March 1997	Wycombe Wanderers	A	0–3	6,562	
1 April 1997	Burnley	H	2–1	4,462	Brass (own goal), Spink
5 April 1997	Brentford	A	0–0	5,355	
12 April 1997	Wrexham	H	0–1	4,553	
19 April 1997	Luton Town	A	0–2	6,968	
26 April 1997	Preston North End	H	0–2	5,341	
3 May 1997	Gillingham	A	0–2	6,183	

=== FA Cup ===
Round	Date	Opponent	Venue	Result	Attendance	Goalscorers
R1	16 November 1996	Scarborough	H	1–1	2,819	Stevens
R1R	26 November 1996	Scarborough	A	0–1	2,247	

=== League Cup ===
Round	Date	Opponent	Venue	Result	Attendance	Goalscorers
R1 1st Leg	21 August 1996	Tranmere Rovers	H	0–2	2,875	
R1 2nd Leg	3 September 1996	Tranmere Rovers	H	1–1 (lost 1–3 on agg)	3,028	Rowbotham

=== Football League Trophy ===
Round	Date	Opponent	Venue	Result	Attendance	Goalscorers
R2 (North)	14 January 1997	Wigan Athletic	H	3–2 (a.e.t.)	1,639	Anthrobus, Stevens, Evans (pen)
QF (North)	11 February 1997	Scunthorpe United	H	2–1 (a.e.t.)	1,728	Berkley, Evans (pen)
SF (North)	18 February 1997	Carlisle United	H	1–2	2,774	Evans

== Squad ==
Note: Flags indicate national team as defined under FIFA eligibility rules; some limited exceptions apply. Players may hold more than one non-FIFA nationality.

No.	Pos.	Nation	Player
—	GK	ENG	Paul Edwards
—	GK	DEN	Benny Gall
—	DF	ENG	Nathan Blamey
—	DF	DEN	Thomas Nielsen
—	DF	ENG	Kevin Seabury
—	DF	ENG	Dean Spink
—	DF	ENG	Lee Taylor
—	DF	ENG	Dave Walton
—	DF	ENG	Peter Whiston
—	MF	ENG	Austin Berkley
—	MF	ENG	Darren Currie
—	MF	ENG	James Cope
—	MF	IRL	Mark Dempsey
—	MF	WAL	Paul Evans
—	MF	ENG	Emeka Nwadike

No.	Pos.	Nation	Player
—	MF	ENG	Ian Reed
—	MF	ENG	Richard Scott
—	MF	ENG	Mark Taylor
—	MF	ENG	Darren Wrack (on loan from Grimsby Town)
—	MF	ENG	Shaun Wray
—	FW	ENG	Steve Anthrobus
—	FW	ENG	Frankie Bennett (on loan from Southampton)
—	FW	ENG	Junior Bent (on loan from Bristol City)
—	FW	ENG	Anthony Briscoe
—	FW	ENG	Mickey Brown
—	FW	WAL	Darran Rowbotham
—	FW	MLT	Ian Stevens
—	FW	ENG	Craig Tate
—	FW	WAL	Nick Ward
