= 1991–92 Sheffield Wednesday F.C. season =

English football club season

Sheffield Wednesday
1991–92 season
- Chairman: Dave Richards
- Manager: Trevor Francis (player-manager)
- Stadium: Hillsborough
- First Division: 3rd
- FA Cup: Fourth round
- League Cup: Third round
- Full Members Cup: Quarter finals
- Top goalscorer: League: Hirst (18); All: Hirst (21)
- Average home league attendance: 29,578

During the 1991–92 English football season, Sheffield Wednesday F.C. competed in the Football League First Division, following promotion from the Second Division the previous season.

== Season summary ==
Having guided Sheffield Wednesday to promotion to the First Division and League Cup glory the previous season, Ron Atkinson left Wednesday for Aston Villa (in somewhat controversial circumstances, having claimed that he was staying on at Wednesday before departing a week later). He was replaced by striker Trevor Francis, who juggled his playing responsibilities with his management role. Under Francis, Wednesday enjoyed a fabulous season, finishing third, behind Leeds United and Manchester United and ahead of bigger clubs like Liverpool and Arsenal; this gave Wednesday qualification to the UEFA Cup.

Despite their overall good form, Wednesday still found themselves on the receiving ends of the season's heaviest home (6–1 to Leeds) and away (7–1 to Arsenal) defeats. Wednesday also lost both of that season's derbies against arch-rivals Sheffield United, losing 1–3 at home and 2–0 at Bramall Lane.

== Final league table ==
Pos	Team	Pld	W	D	L	GF	GA	GD	Pts	Qualification or relegation
1	Leeds United (C)	42	22	16	4	74	37	+37	82	Qualification for the UEFA Champions League first round and qualification for the FA Premier League
2	Manchester United	42	21	15	6	63	33	+30	78	Qualification for the UEFA Cup first round and qualification for the FA Premier League (Note: Manchester United also won the League Cup – that UEFA Cup qualifying place was passed down to the third-placed League team.)
3	Sheffield Wednesday	42	21	12	9	62	49	+13	75	Qualification for the UEFA Cup first round and qualification for the FA Premier League
4	Arsenal	42	19	15	8	81	46	+35	72	Qualification for the FA Premier League
5	Manchester City	42	20	10	12	61	48	+13	70	Qualification for the FA Premier League

Source: World Football
Rules for classification: 1) Points; 2) Goal difference; 3) Goals scored
(C) Champions

== Results ==
Sheffield Wednesday's score comes first

=== Legend ===
Win	Draw	Loss

=== Football League First Division ===
Date	Opponent	Venue	Result	Attendance	Scorers
17 August 1991	Aston Villa	H	2–3	36,749	Hirst, Wilson
24 August 1991	Leeds United	A	1–1	30,260	Hirst
28 August 1991	Everton	H	2–1	28,690	Anderson, Wilson
31 August 1991	Queens Park Rangers	H	4–1	25,022	Palmer (3), Sheridan
3 September 1991	Notts County	A	1–2	12,297	Pearson
7 September 1991	Nottingham Forest	H	2–1	31,289	Francis, P Williams
14 September 1991	Manchester City	A	1–0	29,453	P Williams
18 September 1991	Norwich City	A	0–1	12,503	
21 September 1991	Southampton	H	2–0	27,291	P Williams, Worthington
28 September 1991	Liverpool	A	1–1	37,071	Harkes
2 October 1991	Wimbledon	A	1–2	3,121	Pearson
5 October 1991	Crystal Palace	H	4–1	26,230	Hirst (2), Palmer, Worthington
19 October 1991	Luton Town	A	2–2	9,401	Hirst, Sheridan
26 October 1991	Manchester United	H	3–2	38,260	Jemson (2), Hirst
2 November 1991	Tottenham Hotspur	H	0–0	31,573	
17 November 1991	Sheffield United	A	0–2	31,832	
23 November 1991	Arsenal	H	1–1	32,174	Hirst
30 November 1991	West Ham United	A	2–1	24,116	Harkes, Jemson
7 December 1991	Chelsea	H	3–0	27,383	Hirst (2), P Williams
21 December 1991	Wimbledon	H	2–0	20,574	Sheridan (2)
26 December 1991	Everton	A	1–0	30,788	Hirst
28 December 1991	Queens Park Rangers	A	1–1	12,990	Hirst
1 January 1992	Oldham Athletic	H	1–1	32,679	Sharp (own goal)
12 January 1992	Leeds United	H	1–6	32,228	Sheridan
18 January 1992	Aston Villa	A	1–0	28,036	Jemson
1 February 1992	Luton Town	H	3–2	22,291	Harkes, Hirst, P Williams
8 February 1992	Manchester United	A	1–1	47,074	Hirst
15 February 1992	Arsenal	A	1–7	26,805	Worthington
22 February 1992	West Ham United	H	2–1	26,150	Anderson, Palmer
29 February 1992	Chelsea	A	3–0	17,538	P Williams, Wilson, Worthington
7 March 1992	Coventry City	H	1–0	23,959	Anderson
11 March 1992	Sheffield United	H	1–3	40,327	King
14 March 1992	Tottenham Hotspur	A	2–0	23,027	Hirst, P Williams
21 March 1992	Notts County	H	1–0	23,910	Hirst
28 March 1992	Oldham Athletic	A	0–3	15,897	
4 April 1992	Nottingham Forest	A	2–0	26,105	Hirst, P Williams
8 April 1992	Coventry City	A	0–0	13,293	
11 April 1992	Manchester City	H	2–0	32,138	Hirst, Worthington
18 April 1992	Southampton	A	1–0	17,715	Hirst
20 April 1992	Norwich City	H	2–0	27,362	Nilsson, Sheridan
25 April 1992	Crystal Palace	A	1–1	21,573	P Williams
2 May 1992	Liverpool	H	0–0	34,861	

=== FA Cup ===
Round	Date	Opponent	Venue	Result	Attendance	Goalscorers
R3	4 January 1992	Preston North End	A	2–0	14,337	Bart-Williams, Sheridan
R4	4 February 1992	Middlesbrough	H	1–2	29,772	Hirst

=== League Cup ===
Round	Date	Opponent	Venue	Result	Attendance	Goalscorers
R2 1st leg	24 September 1991	Leyton Orient	A	0–0	6,231	
R2 2nd leg	9 October 1991	Leyton Orient	H	4–1 (won 4–1 on agg)	14,938	Francis (2), Anderson, P Williams
R3	30 October 1991	Southampton	H	1–1	17,627	Hirst
R3R	20 November 1991	Southampton	A	0–1	10,801	

=== Full Members Cup ===
Round	Date	Opponent	Venue	Result	Attendance	Goalscorers
NR2	23 October 1991	Manchester City	H	3–2	7,951	Hirst, Hyde, Jemson
NQF	26 November 1991	Notts County	A	0–1	4,118	

== Players ==
=== First-team squad ===
Squad at end of season

Note: Flags indicate national team as defined under FIFA eligibility rules; some limited exceptions apply. Players may hold more than one non-FIFA nationality.

Pos.	Nation	Player
GK	ENG	Marlon Beresford
GK	ENG	Lance Key
GK	ENG	Kevin Pressman
GK	ENG	Chris Woods
DF	ENG	Viv Anderson
DF	ENG	Chris Bart-Williams (Note: Bart-Williams was born in Freetown, Sierra Leone, but was raised in England and represented them at U-21 and B level.)
DF	ENG	Phil King
DF	SWE	Roland Nilsson
DF	ENG	Nigel Pearson (captain)
DF	ENG	Peter Shirtliff
DF	ENG	Paul Warhurst
DF	ENG	Julian Watts
DF	NIR	Nigel Worthington
MF	USA	John Harkes
MF	ENG	Graham Hyde

Pos.	Nation	Player
MF	ENG	Ryan Jones (Note: Jones was born in Sheffield, England, but also qualified to represent Wales internationally and made his international debut for Wales in May 1994.)
MF	ENG	Steve MacKenzie
MF	ENG	Steve McCall
MF	ENG	Carlton Palmer
MF	IRL	John Sheridan (Note: Sheridan was born in Stretford, England, but also qualified to represent the Republic of Ireland internationally and represented them at U-21 level before making his international debut for the Republic of Ireland in 1988.)
MF	ENG	Mark Taylor
MF	NIR	Danny Wilson (Note: Wilson was born in Wigan, England, but also qualified to represent Northern Ireland internationally and made his international debut for Northern Ireland in 1987.)
FW	ENG	Leroy Chambers
FW	ENG	Trevor Francis
FW	ENG	David Hirst
FW	ENG	Nigel Jemson
FW	ENG	David Johnson
FW	ENG	Gordon Watson
FW	ENG	Mike Williams
FW	ENG	Paul Williams

== Transfers ==
=== In ===
Date	Pos	Name	From	Fee
17 July 1991	DF	Paul Warhurst	Oldham Athletic	£750,000
15 August 1991	GK	Chris Woods	Rangers	£1,200,000
17 September 1991	FW	Nigel Jemson	Nottingham Forest	£800,000
21 November 1991	MF	Chris Bart-Williams	Leyton Orient	£275,000
13 March 1992	DF	Julian Watts	Rotherham United	£80,000

=== Out ===
Date	Pos	Name	To	Fee
11 June 1991	DF	Jon Newsome	Leeds United	£150,000
15 July 1991	DF	David Wetherall	Leeds United	£125,000
15 August 1991	DF	Lawrie Madden	Wolverhampton Wanderers	Free transfer
13 September 1991	MF	Mark Taylor	Shrewsbury Town	£70,000
26 March 1992	MF	Steve McCall	Plymouth Argyle	£25,000

Transfers in: ▼£3,105,000
Transfers out: ▲£370,000
Total spending: ▼£2,735,000
