= History of Shrewsbury Town F.C. =

History of an English football club

The history of Shrewsbury Town Football Club, an English football club based in Shrewsbury, Shropshire, dates back to the club's formation in 1886.

== Early history ==
Shrewsbury Town were formed at a meeting on 20 May 1886 at the Turf Hotel in Claremont Hill, Shrewsbury. This was following the demise of first Shropshire Wanderers and later indirectly after Castle Blues. The Blues were a rough team, leading to their demise after several games were marred by violence. The new team hoped to be as successful but without the notoriety. Press reports differ as to the date the new club was formed, The Eddowes Shropshire Journal of 26 May 1886 reported the birth of the club at the Lion Hotel, Wyle Cop, Shrewsbury. The Shrewsbury Chronicle reported the club's being formed at the Turf Hotel, Claremont Hill, Shrewsbury. It may be both accounts are true, with a get-together at the Lion being finalised at the Turf.

After friendlies and regional cup competitions for the first few seasons, Shrewsbury were founder members of the Shropshire & District League in 1890–91, later admitted to the Birmingham & District League in 1895–96. Many of the teams Town faced in the early days have vanished, however Shrewsbury met many of today's Football League and Conference teams, including Crewe Alexandra, Coventry City, Stoke City, Kidderminster Harriers and Stafford Rangers.

In 1910, Shrewsbury looked to move to a new ground, having spent early years at locations across the town, notably at Copthorne Barracks west of the town. The club moved to Gay Meadow on the edge of the town centre, within sight of Shrewsbury Abbey, and stayed 97 years.

Shrewsbury's Birmingham League days were mostly mid-table, with a few seasons challenging near the top, the club being league champions in 1922–23.

A move to the Midland Champions League in 1937–38 saw the club enjoy one of its most successful seasons, winning a league and cup treble. Shrewsbury were league champions, scoring 111 goals . In addition, the Welsh Cup was won following a replay, the team enjoyed a run in the FA Cup, and won the Shropshire Senior Cup.

After a run of good seasons in post-war years, Shrewsbury were admitted to the old Division 3 (North) of the Football League in 1950, after being Midland League champions in 1949–50.

== Football League history ==
Chart of yearly table positions of The Shrews in the Football League.

Shrewsbury Town were elected to the Football League Division 3 North for 1950–51 following the decision to expand from 88 to 92 clubs. Shrewsbury were then promoted to the Third Division in 1958–59. They remained in the third tier 15 years, slipping back to Division Four at the end of 1973–74.

1960–61 season saw Shrewsbury Town reach the semi-final of the League Cup. After beating Everton (then the biggest club in the country) in the quarter-final they narrowly lost 4–3 on aggregate to Rotherham United. This era was also remembered for Arthur Rowley. He arrived from Leicester City in 1958, the club's first player/manager. During his playing and managerial career, he broke Dixie Dean's goal-scoring record, scoring his 380th league goal against Bradford City at Valley Parade on 29 April 1961. Retiring from playing in 1965 he remained manager until July 1968.

Shrewsbury were promoted to the Third Division in 1974–75 as runners-up, before another successful season in 1978–79, when they were league champions under Ritchie Barker and later Graham Turner. Over 14,000 fans packed Gay Meadow on 17 May 1979 to see Shrewsbury seal promotion with a 4–1 win over Exeter City.
In addition, the club had their best ever FA Cup run.

FA Cup 1st round, 25 November 1978
15:00 GMT

Mansfield Town	0–2	Shrewsbury Town
		Biggins, Atkins, T.Robinson

Field Mill, Mansfield
Attendance: 4,881

FA Cup 2nd round, 16 December 1978
15:00 GMT

Doncaster Rovers	0–3	Shrewsbury Town
		Chapman, Maguire (2)

Belle Vue, Doncaster
FA Cup 3rd round, 6 January 1979
15:00 GMT

Shrewsbury Town	3–1	Cambridge United
Maguire, Turner, Chapman

Gay Meadow, Shrewsbury
Attendance: 7,416
FA Cup 4th round, 27 January 1979
15:00 GMT

Shrewsbury Town	2–0	Manchester City
Maguire, Chapman

Gay Meadow, Shrewsbury
Attendance: 14,215

FA Cup 5th round, 20 February 1979
15:00 GMT

Aldershot Town	2–2	Shrewsbury Town
		Maguire, Tong

Recreation Ground, Aldershot
Attendance: 11,895

FA Cup 5th round replay, 26 February 1979
19:30 GMT

Shrewsbury Town	3–1	Aldershot Town
Biggins (2), Leonard

Gay Meadow, Shrewsbury
Attendance: 13,720

FA Cup 6th round, 10 March 1979
15:00 GMT

Wolverhampton Wanderers	1–1	Shrewsbury Town
		Atkins (Pen)

Molineux Stadium, Wolverhampton
Attendance: 40,946

FA Cup 6th round replay, 13 March 1979
19:30 GMT

Shrewsbury Town	1–3	Wolverhampton Wanderers
Keay

Gay Meadow, Shrewsbury
Attendance: 16,279

The most successful manager is Graham Turner, who won the Third Division Championship in 1978–79 – his first season in charge and took the club into the Second Division for the first time. They remained for ten years, although Turner departed for Aston Villa in 1984.

== 1980s & 1990s ==
The club enjoyed some great times in the FA Cup in the late 1970s and early 1980s. Shrewsbury repeated their 1979 feat of reaching the quarter-final in 1981–82. The fifth-round game was particularly memorable, as Shrewsbury were drawn to face UEFA Cup holders Ipswich Town for the second year (Ipswich previously winning 3–0 in a fifth round replay). Ipswich were one of Europe's top teams. Shrewsbury won 2–1 with goals from Steve Cross and Jake King, Mich D'Avray scoring for the visitors. Following this win, Shrewsbury faced Leicester City at Filbert Street in the quarter-final. With the game 2–2 at half time, Shrewsbury were 45 minutes from a semi-final appearance, but Leicester, having used three goalkeepers and including a young Gary Lineker in their line up, eventually ran out 5–2 winners.

The 1980s saw many big teams defeated by Shrewsbury, whose period in the old Second Division coincided with some of the current Premier League clubs. During the 1980s, Fulham, Newcastle United, Blackburn Rovers, West Ham United and Chelsea lost to Shrewsbury Town. Middlesbrough were defeated at Gay Meadow at the end of 1985–86, Shrewsbury winning 2–1, relegating Middlesbrough, who went out of business and almost out of existence. The match was marred by violence from Middlesbrough fans, with many of them later having to return to Shrewsbury for court appearances.

In the early to mid-1980s the club enjoyed its most successful Football League run. Shrewsbury survived through the sale of players, with some to have played for Shrewsbury including Steve Ogrizovic, David Moyes, John McGinlay and Bernard McNally.

After a couple of relegation scares, Shrewsbury's Second Division life ended at the end of 1988–89 after ten years. As the 1990s dawned, the club were unable to make a quick return to the Second Division, spending the early 1990s mid-table. In the Third Division, on 22 December 1990, Gary Shaw scored the quickest Town hat trick – 4 minutes and 32 seconds – against Bradford City at Valley Parade. At the end of 1991–92, three years after relegation to the Third Division, the club was relegated to the Fourth – the first time since 1975. However, two seasons later Shrewsbury won the new (fourth tier) Division Three championship under Fred Davies in 1993–94, and remained in Division Two (third tier) three seasons. Shrewsbury were not to rise any further, remaining mid-table before slipping down again at the end of 1996–97.

The 1990s saw Shrewsbury make their first appearance at Wembley as finalists in the 1996 Football League Trophy final. Shrewsbury lost 2–1 to Rotherham United; future Shrewsbury striker Nigel Jemson scoring both Rotherham goals.

The Wembley final was the beginning of the end for Fred Davies, sacked at the end of the 1996–97 relegation season. By this time, Shrewsbury were less of a force, heading to a stale period. Dwindling crowds meant Shrewsbury didn't have the finances to compete and it was in this backdrop that Jake King arrived, following a successful reign at local rivals Telford United. A successful Shrewsbury player during the 1980s, King was well regarded by fans and the chairman, businessman Roland Wycherley. For Wycherley, the priority was to assure Shrewsbury's financial future, before increasing the club's profile and finally to ensure the club's move to a new ground. King was forced to work on one of the smallest playing budgets in the league. He worked with the club's youth set-up, bringing in promising non-league players. However, with the pick of the transfer market finding better offers elsewhere, Shrewsbury were to see out the 1990s in mediocre fashion.

== Kevin Ratcliffe era ==
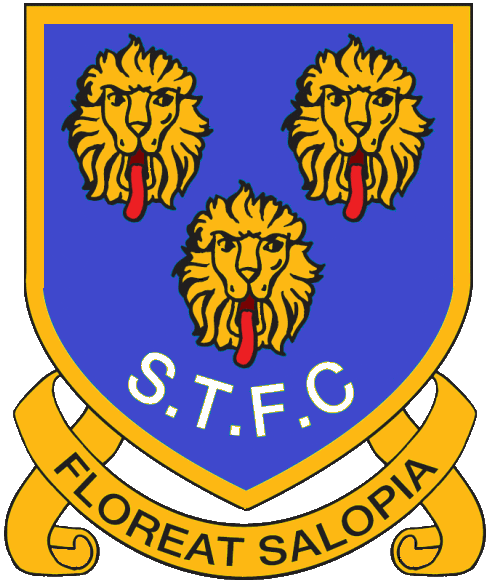
Loggerheads emblem used by the club between 1993 and 2007

In the 1999–2000, Shrewsbury endured a poor season, with King being sacked in November as the club flirted with relegation. Former Everton captain and Welsh international Kevin Ratcliffe was appointed manager steered the club from relegation on the final day of 1999–2000. With the club facing relegation to the Conference, a 2–1 victory away to Exeter City kept the club in the league, after Carlisle United and Chester City both lost, Chester being relegated.

Ratcliffe worked on improving the side. Former youth team and reserve player Luke Rodgers emerged as a regular goal-scorer, and with big names arriving at Shrewsbury, the team looked on the up, narrowly missing the 2001–02 league playoffs despite 70 points.

At the start of 2002–03, Shrewsbury were on the up, with a youthful team strengthened by Ian Woan, Nigel Jemson and Mark Atkins. However, despite an encouraging start, league form suffered, including away defeats to Boston United, Rushden & Diamonds and Cambridge United, Town conceding 16 goals across the three matches as they remained in the bottom half of the table.

A sideshow was an FA Cup run. After dispatching non-league sides Stafford Rangers and Barrow A.F.C., Shrewsbury were at home to Everton in the third round. Town won in front of 7,800. A first-half free kick from Nigel Jemson gave Town the lead at the interval, however an equaliser from Niclas Alexandersson appeared to send the tie to a replay at Goodison Park. However, with minutes left, from a free kick by Ian Woan, Jemson heading in the cross to give Town 2–1 victory. For Shrewsbury fans, a notable point was the performance of Shrewsbury's Peter Wilding. A former Sunday League defender from local leagues, Wilding kept Wayne Rooney marked. Wilding was also one to escape criticism later.

Chelsea were the fourth round visitors, in a televised match on BBC's Match of the Day. Town lost 4–0, with Gianfranco Zola the man of the match.

A near capacity crowd of 7,950 turned up for Chelsea, but from then form disappeared. The team won just twice in the league thereafter. Jemson, who split opinions; was a scapegoat, (Jemson was once in an argument mid-match with a Shrewsbury fan), with Ian Woan another singled out, being booed off after being substituted in his final Shrewsbury appearance. That was against Carlisle United, a 3–2 defeat relegating Shrewsbury. Seven points adrift at the bottom and having conceded 92 goals, the club contemplated the end of their 53 years in the league. Following angry demonstrations from fans, Ratcliffe resigned, and Mark Atkins took temporary charge for the club final League game, a 2–1 defeat to Scunthorpe United, who were coincidentally the first League opponents for Shrewsbury Town back in 1950.

== Conference days ==
After some speculation, Northwich Victoria manager Jimmy Quinn was appointed Shrewsbury manager in May 2003, with the aim of getting Shrewsbury promoted back to the Football League at the first attempt. For the first time in many years, Shrewsbury were seen as the 'big fish' in the league, with many experts predicting a league victory. With most of the previous year's players released, Quinn assembled a whole new squad, with experienced non-league players such as Darren Tinson and Jake Sedgemore being joined by Colin Cramb, Scott Howie and former League Cup finalist Martin O'Connor.

On the field, a new-look Shrewsbury side seemed to have the desire that the previous side lacked, but at times lacked consistency. Thrilling matches, such as a 4–1 home victory over Hereford United, were tempered by some embarrassing results, including a 5–0 away defeat to Dagenham & Redbridge and two away defeats to local rivals Telford United, both in the league and the FA Trophy. However, as the season went on, the side were able to grind out some decent results. The league title went to Chester City, but with 74 points, Shrewsbury finished third in the league, comfortably qualifying for the league playoffs, the first time the club had ever qualified for a playoff competition.

In the semi-finals, Shrewsbury faced Barnet over two legs. The opening leg at Underhill saw Shrewsbury lose 2–1, with Barnet scoring an injury time winner. Over 7,000 saw the return match at Gay Meadow, a match that was televised live on Sky Sports. Shrewsbury drew level on aggregate following a Luke Rodgers penalty. With the teams level after extra-time, Scott Howie saved a penalty from Barnet's Simon Clist, and Darren Moss scored the winning penalty, setting Shrewsbury for the Conference playoff final against Aldershot Town, at the neutral venue of the Britannia Stadium, home of Stoke City.

The final against Aldershot, on Sunday 16 May 2004 saw 19,216 fans visit the Britannia Stadium, two-thirds of those being Shrewsbury fans making the short journey up the A53. In glorious sunny weather, the two teams played out a 1–1 draw, and after both teams blew their chance to win the match in injury time, the game went to penalties.

Striker Luke Rodgers, seemingly a banker to score a penalty stepped up, but inexplicably blasted his shot high over the bar. With Shrewsbury fans anxiously looking on, Shrewsbury goalkeeper Scott Howie earned himself a place in Shrewsbury folklore as he saved three consecutive Aldershot penalties. Shrewsbury converted their remaining penalties, defender Trevor Challis scored the winning penalty and began the celebrations, which began at Stoke, and continued in Shrewsbury for weeks. It may not have been glorious, but by sheer hard work, Shrewsbury were back in the Football League.

== Return to Football League ==
Unfortunately for Shrewsbury, the optimism from the play-off final victory soon evaporated. An opening day 1–0 defeat to Lincoln City was an indicator of what was to come, as Shrewsbury were to flirt with the relegation places and were defeated in the FA Cup first round by Histon. In the eyes of most fans, Jimmy Quinn was not up to the job, and departed after just 14 league games, being replaced by former Preston manager Gary Peters. Peters came to Gay Meadow with a modest but at the same time impressive track record, including a spell as Preston manager during the mid-1990s, during which he signed David Beckham as a loan player. After nearly saving Exeter City from relegation in 2002–03, he resigned and was working as a scout for Everton before taking up the Shrewsbury job.

With the club seemingly on a downward spiral back to the Conference, Peters was able to stem the slide, and preserved Shrewsbury's Football League status in the 2004–05 League Two campaign. Since, Peters looked to strengthen the side, transforming the side from one that was favourites for relegation in 2004–05, to one that were seen as realistic promotion candidates. Many pundits saw Shrewsbury as relegation favourites in the 2005–06 season, but despite a poor start, Peters was able to guide the team to a tenth-place finish, narrowly missing the play-offs.

Off the field, Shrewsbury, for so long one of the smallest and least-funded teams in the league, had cause to look to the future with optimism. The Shrewsbury Town board, headed by Roland Wycherley, was starting to see their policy of sound financial management pay off, with the club more solvent than many of its rivals. The recent FA cup run, subsequent fall-out from the Ratcliffe era and the solitary season in the Conference had galvanised local support, and attendances were on the increase.

And finally, after a drawn-out, and sometimes bitter planning process stretching as far back as 1999, Shrewsbury's plans to move ground came to fruition, as Wycherly ceremoniously cut the first sod of soil at the New Meadow in the summer of 2006.

Despite the departure of talented young goalkeeper Joe Hart to Manchester City, Shrewsbury entered the 2006–07 season as promotion hopefuls in their final year at Gay Meadow. However the home ground was to wreak havoc with the opening part of Shrewsbury's season, poor weather leading to the ground being flooded and several matches being called off. With several matches in hand due to the cancellations, the club were as low as 16th in the table by February 2007, but with the team going on an impressive 14 match unbeaten run, they were in play-off contention by the end of the season.

Following a 2–2 draw against Grimsby Town in the final League match to be held at Gay Meadow, Shrewsbury finished in seventh place and thus qualified for the play-offs. Shrewsbury faced Milton Keynes Dons over two legs, following a goalless draw at the Gay Meadow, they beat MK Dons 2–1 on their return fixture at the National Hockey Stadium, thus winning 2–1 on aggregate. With Andy Cooke scoring both goals.

The team faced Bristol Rovers in the League Two play-off final on 26 May 2007 at the new Wembley Stadium in front of a League 2(4th tier) play-off final record crowd of 61,589. However, despite an early goal from Stewart Drummond, Bristol Rovers were strong opponents and hit back with two first half goals through Richard Walker. A late Sammy Igoe goal made it 3–1 to Bristol Rovers, sealing their victory.

== New stadium ==
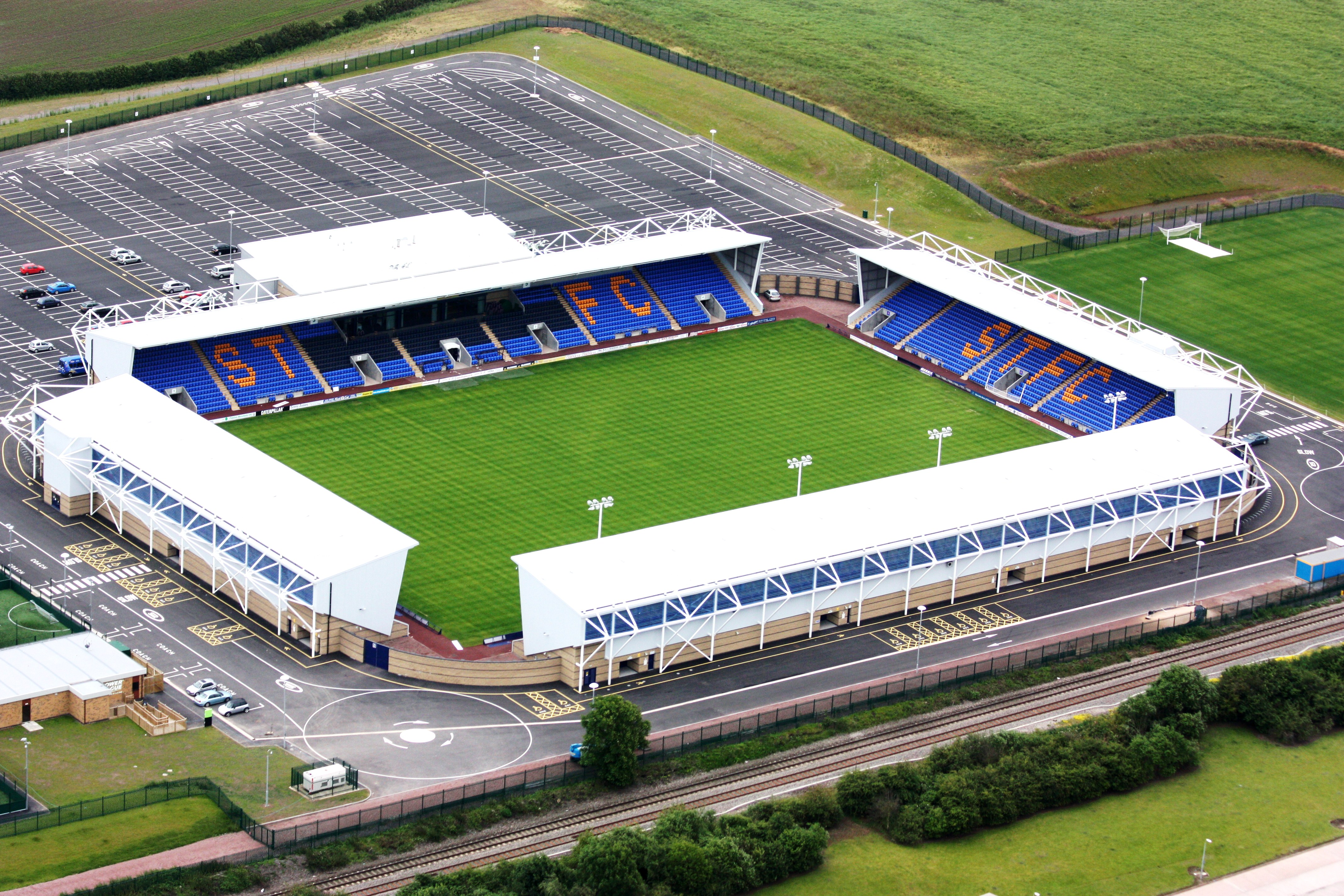
Greenhous Meadow, Shrewsbury.

The club moved to the New Meadow stadium for the 2007–08 season. After an encouraging early start which began with a 4–0 win away to Lincoln City, Shrewsbury were amongst the league leaders, however a 4–3 home defeat to Rochdale started an alarming nosedive in form from which the side never recovered. Following pressure from supporters, manager Gary Peters left the club on 3 March 2008 by mutual consent. Paul Simpson was appointed as the new manager on a 3-year contract on 12 March, and was able to guide the club to an eventual 18th-place finish in the league. On 21 July the club announced that it had secured a deal with kit manufacturer Prostar for the naming rights of the stadium, which saw the club's Oteley Road stadium officially renamed as 'The Prostar Stadium'.

The 2008/9 season saw Shrewsbury make a successful start, with the club running amongst the leading clubs in League Two. Home form was amongst the strongest in the Football League, with the team winning an unprecedented number of games with a high goal margin, including a 4–0 win over Macclesfield Town on the opening day of the season, and a record-equalling 7–0 league win over Gillingham, the team who would eventually beat them in the playoff final. Shrewsbury progressed to the latter stages of the Football League Trophy, following a 7–0 away win at Wycombe Wanderers, and 5–0 home win against Dagenham and Redbridge until going out in a penalty shoot out against league one's Brighton and Hove Albion. However the club's indifferent FA Cup form of recent years did not improve as they lost away to a non-league side for the second time in five years, being beaten 3–1 by Blyth Spartans in the first round.

Shrewsbury's league campaign during 2008/09 was hampered by a lack of wins away from home. Despite several encouraging performances, Shrewsbury's win at their opening away match, versus Exeter City was to be their only league victory away from home for eight months, until beating Rotherham United 2–1 at the Don Valley Stadium in April. The final day of the season saw Shrewsbury lying just outside the play-off places in eighth place, behind seventh place Dagenham and Redbridge, whom the club travelled to for their final league game of the season. A dramatic 2–1 victory saw Shrewsbury snatch the final play-off place at the expense of the plucky Daggers, in only their second season of league football.

Shrewsbury faced Bury in the play off semi finals, with a then record crowd of 8,429 turning up for the opening home game, which saw Bury take a narrow 1–0 win thanks to a late own goal from ex-Shrewsbury defender Neil Ashton, who chipped the ball over goalkeeper Luke Daniels in a defensive-mix up.

Whilst Daniels was seen by some as the villain after the home leg, three days later he produced a man of the match performance as Shrewsbury progressed to their second play-off final in three years. Daniels saved a first-half penalty from Phil Jevons, however with time running out Kevin McIntyre scored a spectacular 88th minute volley to take the tie into extra time. Daniels was to keep Shrewsbury in the tie during extra-time as Bury tried to finish the game, with Shrewsbury's plight being made tougher after midfielder Steve Leslie was controversially sent off just seconds into extra time. However, with the scores 1–1 on aggregate, Shrewsbury were to convert all four of their spot-kicks in the penalty shootout, with Daniels making two saves to send Shrewsbury through 4–3 on aggregate.

Shrewsbury lost 0–1 to Gillingham in the play-off final at Wembley Stadium on 23 May in front of 53,706, with a goal in the 90th minute by Gillingham's Simeon Jackson which was seen as controversial because referee Clive Oliver gave a corner when video evidence showed it clearly wasn't.

On 30 April 2010, after a disappointing 2009–10 season, Paul Simpson was dismissed as manager of Shrewsbury Town with two games remaining. Three Caretaker managers were installed for the remaining two games, reserve team manager Stuart Delaney, youth team coach David Hughes and former club captain Mike Jackson. Shrewsbury finished a measurable 12th after showing signs throughout the campaign of at least finishing in a play off spot, even briefly challenging for the automatic spots around the New Year period. Coincidentally, performances in their last two games noticeably improved after Simpson's dismissal. Even with the absence of top-scorer Dave Hibbert during the games, the Town showed positive attacking football. A draw against Morecambe on 1 May would've even made the playoffs still mathematically possible, although taking into account other team results. The game ended in a 3–2 defeat after Kevin McIntyre's failed attempt to level it 3–3 in added time from the penalty spot. They went to local rivals Port Vale on the final day of the season and despite the circumstances, finished the season with relatively strong form. They managed a draw with Vale, the home side only managing to equalise from the penalty spot.

== Return of Graham Turner ==
With such previous success as player and manager of Shrewsbury Town during their heyday of the late 1970s through to 1984, at Wolverhampton Wanderers, and then at cash-strapped Hereford United as chairman and manager combined, Graham Turner returned to Shrewsbury Town, being installed as manager on 11 June 2010. He couldn't achieve automatic promotion though, and the club finished fourth at the end of the 2010–11 season. During the 2011–12 season Shrewsbury had two mini cup runs in both the League Cup and FA Cup. Their League Cup run saw them defeat Championship side Derby County 3–2 at Pride Park, and Premier League Swansea City 3–1 at Greenhous Meadow before being narrowly beaten 3–1 by the Premiership's Arsenal at The Emirates Stadium. The FA Cup run saw them dispatch Conference club Newport County and League 2 Rotherham United before being very narrowly beaten by 1–0 by the Championship's Middlesbrough at The Riverside Stadium. Furthermore, the club also went a year unbeaten at home finishing the 2011/12 season winning 1–0 over Dagenham and Redbridge from a James Collins header to achieve promotion to League One after 15 years in League Two, excluding spending the 2003–04 season in the Conference.

== Return to the 3rd Tier ==
After a 15-year absence, Salop were promoted to League One with a game to spare, finishing in 2nd place after a home win against Dagenham and Redbridge. Despite the success, preparation for the new campaign started with concern, as five of Shrewsbury's players, all of whom were vital in Salop's promotion success and all also out of contract, were to leave in less than 2 months after sealing promotion, most only being offered 1 year contracts, which surprised many fans. This included keeper Chris Neal, centre back duo Shane Cansdall-Sheriff and (captain) Ian Sharps, central midfielder Nicky Wroe and 2011-12's 16-goal top goalscorer James Collins. However, Graham Turner was able to replace the departed players before pre season with some promising signings. This included experienced keepers Chris Weale from Leicester City and youngster Joe Anyon from Lincoln City, centre back Darren Jones from Aldershot, central midfielders Luke Summerfield (Cheltenham Town) and Asa Hall (Oxford United), utility and former Hereford duo Rob Purdie (Hereford Utd) and Paul Parry (Preston North End), Southampton youngster Ryan Doble (striker) and centre back Michael Hector on-loan from Reading.

Pre season, although naturally lacking the competition of league football, showed real promise for the new League 1 side. Shrewsbury showed great passing, movement on and off the ball and a solid defence, with stand out performances coming from the likes of Hector, Purdie (playing at left back), Summerfield and Parry (playing on the left wing).

The season itself wasn't to run quite as smoothly, and after a 4–0 hammering at Leeds United in the League Cup, Shrewsbury's first game back in the 3rd Tier was to also end in a narrow 1–0 away defeat to predicted promotion hopefuls Sheffield United, despite playing a very good game. Shrewsbury's first few months in League 1 were to be full of promising performances matched with inconsistent results. Beating Preston North End 1–0 at home matched their performances, whilst losing 3–2 to then top of the table Notts County away didn't. It soon became clear that after all the creative football, striker duo Marvin Morgan and Terry Gornell were not producing the goals needed at this higher level of football. As a result, Shrewsbury's form and passing game started to slip from the lack of points and wins, and Graham Turner's side also started to go through many changes game after game, most likely in the hopes of finding the right formula.

Shrewsbury's defence were the next to suffer in form, which began leaking many goals. After the dropping, and eventual departure, of promising on-loan centre back Michael Hector, Darren Jones was to suffer greatly in form. Jones was to be paired with a number of different centre backs, this included Shrewsbury players Reuben Hazell and Jermaine Grandison, as well as loan signings Lee Collins (Barnsley) and Julian Bennett (Sheffield Wednesday), the former making many mistakes much like his partner Jones, the latter showing some more promising performances before returning to Wednesday due to injury.

Shrewsbury's passing game also started to let them down, with the midfield finding it hard to link up with the strikers, most notably captain Matt Richards who had personally failed to match the form he showed in the season prior. As a result, by the turn of the year Shrewsbury found themselves hovering around the relegation places and still yet to clock up a single away win. Shrewsbury's form was to change considerably after knocking up their first away win on New Years Day against Coventry. This coincided with a noticeable improvement in defence, with youngster Connor Goldson finding form, promising performances from centre back loan signings Rob Edwards (Sheffield United) and youngster Yado Mambo (Charlton Athletic), and a greater attacking threat with the signing and return of Shrewsbury legend Luke Rodgers and the rise in form of goalscoring winger Jon Taylor.

The rest of Salop's League One campaign was to be blighted with inconsistency, in performances, tactics and results. Highlights included the introduction of Bolton loanee Tom Eaves. The 6'5 striker managed 6 goals in 10 games, which included an impressive hat trick at home to Crawley Town before being recalled by his parent club, most likely due to his performances. Shrewsbury ultimately managed to seal League One safety with two games to spare after a 1–0 win at home to Oldham Athletic.

== Relegation back to level four, Graham Turner's reign ends ==
During the summer months after eventually staying up with two games to spare, it was a chance to push on and become a major force in League One. However the failure of recruiting the right calibre of player for this level led to as disappointing season. Graham Turner resigned in February after a string of 6 successive defeats and Mike Jackson took over as caretaker boss. Some highlights of the season were the two local derbies against Wolverhampton Wanderers where a new record attendance at Greenhous Meadow was set on 21 September 2013. A crowd of 9,510 saw Town lose 1–0 with a late penalty scored by Bakary Sako the difference between the teams. The return fixture in March saw Town gain a much needed point holding on for a 0–0 draw. Relegation was finally confirmed after a 4–2 home defeat against Peterborough United.

== 2015–present: one promotion, one relegation ==
In May 2014 ex-Fleetwood Town boss Micky Mellon was appointed first team manager. Town were promoted back to League One on 25 April 2015 with a 1–0 victory away to Cheltenham Town via Jean-Louis Akpa Akpro's goal. Mellon left for Tranmere Rovers in October 2016, and he was replaced by Grimsby Town manager Paul Hurst, with Shrewsbury bottom. In 2017–18, Hurst led Shrewsbury to the EFL Trophy Final, ultimately losing to Lincoln. He also led the team to the League One play-offs, but lost to Rotherham after extra time. Hurst left to join Ipswich Town on 30 May 2018. He was replaced by former Macclesfield boss John Askey, but he was sacked later that year in November having won just 5 of their opening 21 games. His successor, Sam Ricketts was appointed manager in December. A highlight of the 2019–20 season under Ricketts was a fourth round FA Cup tie against the holding European champions Liverpool which Shrewsbury drew 2–2. Town narrowly lost the replay 1–0 at Anfield in front of an attendance of 52,399. However, following disruption to the season in March 2020 due to COVID-19, final League One standings were decided on a points per game basis with Shrewsbury finishing in 15th place. In November 2020, Ricketts was sacked with Shrewsbury in 23rd place and was replaced by Steve Cotterill.

Cotterill helped Shrewsbury to a five-year high of 12th place in 2023, then stepped down in June 2023 and was replaced by Matt Taylor, who lasted less than seven months as manager. On 24 January 2024, the club confirmed the reappointment of Paul Hurst as head coach. Shortly after club owner Roland Wycherley announced (in September 2024) that a sale of the club was imminent, Hurst was sacked in October 2024. He was replaced by Gareth Ainsworth, who then left in March 2025, being succeeded by Michael Appleton. The club was then relegated to League Two for the first time in ten years. In February 2026 Gavin Cowan replaced Appleton with the club two points from the relegation places. Cowan led The Shrews on a run of 19 points from 27 to help retain their EFL status. Early the following season, unhappy Shrewsbury fans issued an ultimatum to Wycherley to answer questions about the club's continually delayed sale; this was quickly followed, almost immediately, by an announcement of the club's impending sale to an American consortium. Wycherley said the deal had been in discussion since March 2026. The takeover was confirmed on 9 November 2026.
