= Tommy Lynch =

Tommy Lynch may refer to:

- Tommy Lynch (rugby) (1927–2006), New Zealand rugby union and rugby league player
- Tommy Lynch (footballer) (born 1964), Irish footballer
