= 1995–96 Football League Trophy =

Auto Windscreens Shields Trophy

Tournament details
- Country: England; Wales

The Football League Trophy 1995–96, known as the Auto Windscreens Shield 1995–96 for sponsorship reasons, was the 15th staging of the Football League Trophy, a knock-out competition for English football clubs in the Second and Third Divisions (now known as League One and Two).

The winners were Rotherham United, who defeated Shrewsbury Town 2–1 in the final.

The competition began on 25 September 1995 and ended with the final on 14 April 1996.

The tournament begins with clubs divided into a Northern and a Southern section, and teams entering a group stage. Each section then gradually eliminates the qualifying teams in knock-out fashion until each has a winning finalist. At this point, the two winning finalists face each other in the combined final for the honour of the trophy.

== First round ==
=== Northern Section ===
Group 1
Team	Pld	W	D	L	GF	GA	GD	Pts
Crewe Alexandra	2	1	0	1	8	1	+7	3
Blackpool	2	1	0	1	3	3	0	3
Hartlepool United	2	1	0	1	3	10	−7	3

Date	Team 1	Score	Team 2
26 Sep	Blackpool	1–0	Crewe Alexandra
17 Oct	Crewe Alexandra	8–0	Hartlepool United
7 Nov	Hartlepool United	3–2	Blackpool

Group 2
Team	Pld	W	D	L	GF	GA	GD	Pts
Rotherham United	2	1	1	0	2	1	+1	4
Burnley	2	0	2	0	2	2	0	2
Chester City	2	0	1	1	1	2	−1	1

Date	Team 1	Score	Team 2
26 Sep	Chester City	0–1	Rotherham United
17 Oct	Rotherham United	1–1	Burnley
7 Nov	Burnley	1–1	Chester City

Group 3
Team	Pld	W	D	L	GF	GA	GD	Pts
Chesterfield	2	1	1	0	3	2	+1	4
Notts County	2	1	0	1	2	2	0	3
Stockport County	2	0	1	1	1	2	−1	1

Date	Team 1	Score	Team 2
26 Sep	Stockport County	1–1	Chesterfield
17 Oct	Chesterfield	2–1	Notts County
7 Nov	Notts County	1–0	Stockport County

Group 4
Team	Pld	W	D	L	GF	GA	GD	Pts
Lincoln City	2	2	0	0	5	3	+2	6
Rochdale	2	1	0	1	8	6	+2	3
Darlington	2	0	0	2	2	6	−4	0

Date	Team 1	Score	Team 2
26 Sep	Lincoln City	4–3	Rochdale
24 Oct	Rochdale	5–2	Darlington
7 Nov	Darlington	0–1	Lincoln City

Group 5
Team	Pld	W	D	L	GF	GA	GD	Pts
Scunthorpe United	2	1	1	0	5	1	+4	4
Wigan Athletic	2	0	2	0	1	1	0	2
Bury	2	0	1	1	0	4	−4	1

Date	Team 1	Score	Team 2
26 Sep	Wigan Athletic	1–1	Scunthorpe United
17 Oct	Scunthorpe United	4–0	Bury
14 Nov	Bury	0–0	Wigan Athletic

Group 6
Team	Pld	W	D	L	GF	GA	GD	Pts
Wrexham	2	1	1	0	3	2	+1	4
York City	2	1	0	1	1	1	0	3
Mansfield Town	2	0	1	1	2	3	−1	1

Date	Team 1	Score	Team 2
26 Sep	Mansfield Town	2–2	Wrexham
17 Oct	Wrexham	1–0	York City
7 Nov	York City	1–0	Mansfield Town

Group 7
Team	Pld	W	D	L	GF	GA	GD	Pts
Hull City	2	2	0	0	3	0	+3	6
Preston North End	2	1	0	1	2	2	0	3
Scarborough	2	0	0	2	1	4	−3	0

Date	Team 1	Score	Team 2
26 Sep	Scarborough	0–2	Hull City
17 Oct	Hull City	1–0	Preston North End
7 Nov	Preston North End	2–1	Scarborough

Group 8
Team	Pld	W	D	L	GF	GA	GD	Pts
Doncaster Rovers	2	0	2	0	2	2	0	2
Carlisle United	2	0	2	0	2	2	0	2
Bradford City	2	0	2	0	2	2	0	2

Date	Team 1	Score	Team 2
25 Sep	Doncaster Rovers	1–1	Bradford City
17 Oct	Bradford City	1–1	Carlisle United
7 Nov	Carlisle United	1–1	Doncaster Rovers

The placings in this group were decided by drawing lots.

=== Southern Section ===
Group 1
Team	Pld	W	D	L	GF	GA	GD	Pts
Shrewsbury Town	2	1	1	0	4	2	+2	4
Swansea City	2	0	2	0	1	1	0	2
Leyton Orient	2	0	1	1	1	3	−2	1

Date	Team 1	Score	Team 2
26 Sep	Shrewsbury Town	1–1	Swansea City
17 Oct	Swansea City	0–0	Leyton Orient
7 Nov	Leyton Orient	1–3	Shrewsbury Town

Group 2
Team	Pld	W	D	L	GF	GA	GD	Pts
Cardiff City	2	1	1	0	6	5	+1	4
Hereford United	2	0	2	0	5	5	0	2
Gillingham	2	0	1	1	4	5	−1	1

Date	Team 1	Score	Team 2
26 Sep	Hereford United	3–3	Cardiff City
17 Oct	Cardiff City	3–2	Gillingham
7 Nov	Gillingham	2–2	Hereford United

Group 3
Team	Pld	W	D	L	GF	GA	GD	Pts
Peterborough United	2	1	1	0	3	0	+3	4
Northampton Town	2	1	1	0	1	0	+1	4
Plymouth Argyle	2	0	0	2	0	4	−4	0

Date	Team 1	Score	Team 2
26 Sep	Plymouth Argyle	0–3	Peterborough United
16 Oct	Peterborough United	0–0	Northampton Town
7 Nov	Northampton Town	1–0	Plymouth Argyle

Group 4
Team	Pld	W	D	L	GF	GA	GD	Pts
Walsall	2	2	0	0	10	2	+8	6
Fulham	2	0	1	1	3	6	−3	1
Wycombe Wanderers	2	0	1	1	1	6	−5	1

Date	Team 1	Score	Team 2
10 Oct	Wycombe Wanderers	1–1	Fulham
17 Oct	Fulham	2–5	Walsall
7 Nov	Walsall	5–0	Wycombe Wanderers

Group 5
Team	Pld	W	D	L	GF	GA	GD	Pts
Brentford	2	1	1	0	2	1	+1	4
AFC Bournemouth	2	1	0	1	2	1	+1	3
Exeter City	1	0	1	0	1	3	−2	1

Date	Team 1	Score	Team 2
27 Sep	AFC Bournemouth	0–1	Brentford
17 Oct	Brentford	1–1	Exeter City
7 Nov	Exeter City	0–2	AFC Bournemouth

Group 6
Team	Pld	W	D	L	GF	GA	GD	Pts
Bristol Rovers	2	2	0	0	5	0	+5	6
Brighton	2	1	0	1	4	3	+1	3
Cambridge United	2	0	0	2	1	7	−6	0

Date	Team 1	Score	Team 2
26 Sep	Cambridge United	1–4	Brighton & Hove Albion
17 Oct	Brighton & Hove Albion	0–2	Bristol Rovers
7 Nov	Bristol Rovers	3–0	Cambridge United

Group 7
Team	Pld	W	D	L	GF	GA	GD	Pts
Oxford United	2	2	0	0	6	2	+4	6
Bristol City	2	1	0	1	2	3	−1	3
Barnet	2	0	0	2	2	5	−3	0

Date	Team 1	Score	Team 2
26 Sep	Oxford United	3–0	Bristol City
17 Oct	Bristol City	2–0	Barnet
7 Nov	Barnet	2–3	Oxford United

Group 8
Team	Pld	W	D	L	GF	GA	GD	Pts
Swindon Town	2	1	1	0	3	1	+2	4
Colchester United	2	1	0	1	5	4	+1	3
Torquay United	2	0	1	1	3	6	−3	1

Date	Team 1	Score	Team 2
26 Sep	Colchester United	5–2	Torquay United
17 Oct	Torquay United	1–1	Swindon Town
8 Nov	Swindon Town	2–0	Colchester United

== Second round ==
=== Northern Section ===
Date	Home team	Score	Away team
27 Nov	Doncaster Rovers	1–3	Notts County
28 Nov	Chesterfield	2–1	Rochdale
28 Nov	Hull City	1–2	Blackpool
28 Nov	Lincoln City	2–1	Preston North End
28 Nov	Rotherham United	0 – 0	Wigan Athletic
Rotherham United won 4–1 on penalties
28 Nov	Scunthorpe United	0–3	York City
28 Nov	Wrexham	1–2	Carlisle United
29 Nov	Crewe Alexandra	0 – 1	Burnley

=== Southern Section ===
Date	Home team	Score	Away team
28 Nov	Brentford	0–1	Fulham
28 Nov	Bristol Rovers	2–1	AFC Bournemouth
28 Nov	Cardiff City	1–2	Northampton Town
28 Nov	Oxford United	1–2	Colchester United
28 Nov	Peterborough United	1 – 0	Swansea City
28 Nov	Shrewsbury Town	0 – 0	Bristol City
Shrewsbury Town won 7–6 on penalties
28 Nov	Walsall	1–2	Brighton & Hove Albion
29 Nov	Swindon Town	0–1	Hereford United

== Area-quarter-finals ==
=== Northern Section ===
Date	Home team	Score	Away team
6 Jan	Carlisle United	5–0	Burnley
9 Jan	Blackpool	0–1	Chesterfield
9 Jan	Rotherham United	3–1	Lincoln City
9 Jan	York City	1–0	Notts County

=== Southern Section ===
Date	Home team	Score	Away team
9 Jan	Fulham	1 – 2	Bristol Rovers
9 Jan	Hereford United	1–0	Northampton Town
9 Jan	Peterborough United	3–2	Colchester United
9 Jan	Shrewsbury Town	4–2	Brighton & Hove Albion

== Area semi-finals ==
=== Northern Section ===
Date	Home team	Score	Away team
30 Jan	Carlisle United	1–0	Chesterfield
13 Feb	Rotherham United	4–1	York City

=== Southern Section ===
Date	Home team	Score	Away team
31 Jan	Shrewsbury Town	4–1	Hereford United
13 Feb	Peterborough United	0–1	Bristol Rovers

== Area finals ==
=== Northern Area final ===
Date	Home team	Score	Away team	Attendance
5 Mar	Rotherham United	2–0	Carlisle United	6,858
12 Mar	Carlisle United	0–2	Rotherham United	6,692
Rotherham United won 4–0 on aggregate

=== Southern Area final ===
Date	Home team	Score	Away team	Attendance
5 Mar	Shrewsbury Town	1–1	Bristol Rovers	5,212
12 Mar	Bristol Rovers	0–1	Shrewsbury Town	7,050

== Final ==
14 April 1996

Rotherham United	2–1	Shrewsbury Town
Jemson 20', 58'	Report	Taylor 81'

Wembley, London
Attendance: 35,235
Referee: D.Allison

ROTHERHAM UNITED:
GK	Matt Clarke
DF	Paul Hurst
DF	Ian Breckin	Yellow card
DF	Neil Richardson
DF	Paul Blades
MF	Andy Roscoe
MF	Shaun Goodwin
MF	Darren Garner
MF	Trevor Berry
FW	Nigel Jemson
FW	Shaun Goater
Substitutes:
DF	Gary Bowyer
MF	Andy Hayward
MF	John McGlashan
Manager:
Archie Gemmill & John McGovern

SHREWSBURY TOWN:
GK	Paul Edwards
DF	Chris Withe	Yellow card
DF	Dave Walton
DF	Peter Whiston
DF	John Kay
MF	Mark Taylor
MF	Richard Scott	Yellow card
MF	Carl Robinson	(substituted off) 75'
MF	Austin Berkley
FW	Ian Stevens
FW	Dean Spink	(substituted off) 45'
Substitute:
GK	Tim Clarke
DF	Tommy Lynch	(substituted on) 75'
FW	Steve Anthrobus	(substituted on) 45'
Manager:
Fred Davies

MATCH RULES

- 90 minutes.
- 30 minutes of extra-time if necessary.
- Penalty shoot-out if scores still level.
- Maximum of 3 substitutions.
