= Anthony Briscoe =

English footballer (born 1978)

Personal information
- Date of birth: 16 August 1978 (age 48)
- Place of birth: Birmingham, England
- Height: 5 ft 11 in (1.80 m)
- Position: Forward

Senior career*
Years	Team	Apps	(Gls)
1996–1998	Shrewsbury Town	1	(0)
1998–1999	Tamworth		
- * Club domestic league appearances and goals

Anthony Briscoe (born 16 August 1978) is a footballer who played as a forward for Shrewsbury Town in The Football League.

He made his debut for the Shrews on 1 February 1997 in the Second Division 2–0 defeat to Bristol Rovers at the Memorial Ground. He came on as a second-half substitute for Nick Ward.
