= Tim Clarke (English footballer) =

English footballer

Personal information
- Full name: Timothy Joseph Clarke
- Date of birth: 19 September 1964 (age 62)
- Place of birth: Stourbridge, England
- Position: Goalkeeper

Senior career*
Years	Team	Apps	(Gls)
1989–1990	Halesowen Town	?	
1990–1991	Coventry City	0	(0)
1991–1993	Huddersfield Town	70	(0)
1993	→ Rochdale (loan)	2	(0)
1993	Altrincham	?	(?)
1993–1996	Shrewsbury Town	31	(0)
1996–1997	York City	17	(0)
1997	→ Scunthorpe United (loan)	13	(0)
1997–1999	Scunthorpe United	75	(0)
1999	→ Kidderminster Harriers (loan)	5	(?)
1999–2001	Kidderminster Harriers	50	
2001	Barry Town	?	
2001–2003	Halesowen Town	?	
2003–2005	Evesham United	?	
2005–2006	Bromsgrove Rovers	?	
2008–	Willenhall Town	?	
- * Club domestic league appearances and goals

Timothy Joseph Clarke (born 19 September 1968 in Stourbridge, England) is an English former footballer and now goalkeeper coach.

== Career ==
He is perhaps best known for his spell as number 1 at Huddersfield Town.

One of Clarke's more notable achievements came in 2001, when he was a part of the Barry Town side that won in Azerbaijan against Shamkir FC. The match marked the first ever occasion that Welsh club would progress in the UEFA Champions League. Clarke also played in goal against FC Porto in the next round, helping Barry to a second leg victory that has become footballing folklore in South Wales.

Clarke went into coaching at Halesowen Town before joining Hinckley AFC in May 2014 as a goalkeeper coach.

== Honours ==
Shrewsbury Town

- Football League Trophy runner-up: 1995–96
