= Andy Hayward (footballer) =

English footballer (born 1970)

Personal information
- Full name: Andrew William Hayward
- Date of birth: 21 June 1970 (age 56)
- Place of birth: Barnsley, England
- Positions: Midfielder; striker

Senior career*
Years	Team	Apps	(Gls)
- Frickley Athletic
1994–1998	Rotherham United	120	(15)
1998	→ Woking (loan)	2	(4)
1998–1999	Hednesford Town		
1998	→ Doncaster Rovers (loan)	3	(0)
1999	Barrow		
1999–2000	Frickley Athletic		
2000–2004	Bradford Park Avenue		
2004–2005	Stalybridge Celtic	46	(16)
2005–2007	Ossett Town	53	(32)
2007	North Ferriby United		
2007–2008	Frickley Athletic		
2008–2009	Garforth Town		
- * Club domestic league appearances and goals

Andrew William Hayward is an English former footballer who played as a midfielder and striker.

Hayward started his career in non-league football, and his prolific goalscoring record as well as his skill in volleying soon attracted attention from bigger clubs. He turned professional at the age of 24, joining Rotherham United from Frickley Athletic in 1994. He played 120 league games in four seasons before leaving the club in 1998. Whilst at Rotherham he was a part of the team that won the 1996 Football League Trophy Final. While at Rotherham he was lauded for his volleying ability and was considered the best in this regard within the lower leagues of English Professional Football. He has since played for numerous teams in non-league football.

He signed for Hednesford Town, and had a brief loan spell with Doncaster Rovers. He then moved on to Barrow in February 1999, and helped the club secure survival in the Football Conference league when he scored the opening goal in a 2–1 win against Kidderminster Harriers on the last day of the season. He returned to his old club Frickley Athletic, before being signed by Bradford Park Avenue in September 2000 for a club record fee. He stayed there for several seasons before moving on to Stalybridge Celtic in March 2004. He stayed there until the summer of 2005, scoring 16 goals in 46 appearances.

He went on to play for Ossett Town, playing 53 times and scoring 32 goals, and North Ferriby United. He returned for a third spell at Frickley Athletic, this time as a player-assistant manager before joining Garforth Town.

He last played for Royston Railway in the Barnsley Sunday league football and works as a PE instructor at Evolve Academy, a pupil referral unit in Wakefield.

Hayward currently manages his local Sunday League club Royston FC. His greatest managerial accomplishment to date is winning the Wakefield and District Premier Division Cup in a thrilling 1-0 victory over Beechwood WMC in the 2024/24 season.

== Honours ==
Rotherham United

- Football League Trophy: 1995–96
