= Mark Druce =

English footballer

Personal information
- Date of birth: 3 March 1974 (age 52)
- Place of birth: Oxford, England
- Height: 6 ft 0 in (1.83 m)
- Position: Forward

Senior career*
Years	Team	Apps	(Gls)
1991–1996	Oxford United	52	(4)
1996	→ Rotherham United (loan)	6	(4)
1996–1998	Rotherham United	28	(0)
1998–1999	Hereford United		
1999–2000	Kidderminster Harriers	22	(7)
2000–2001	Woking	8	(0)
- * Club domestic league appearances and goals

Mark Andrew Druce (born 3 March 1974) is an English former professional footballer who played as a forward for various teams in the Football League.
