= Richard Landon =

English footballer

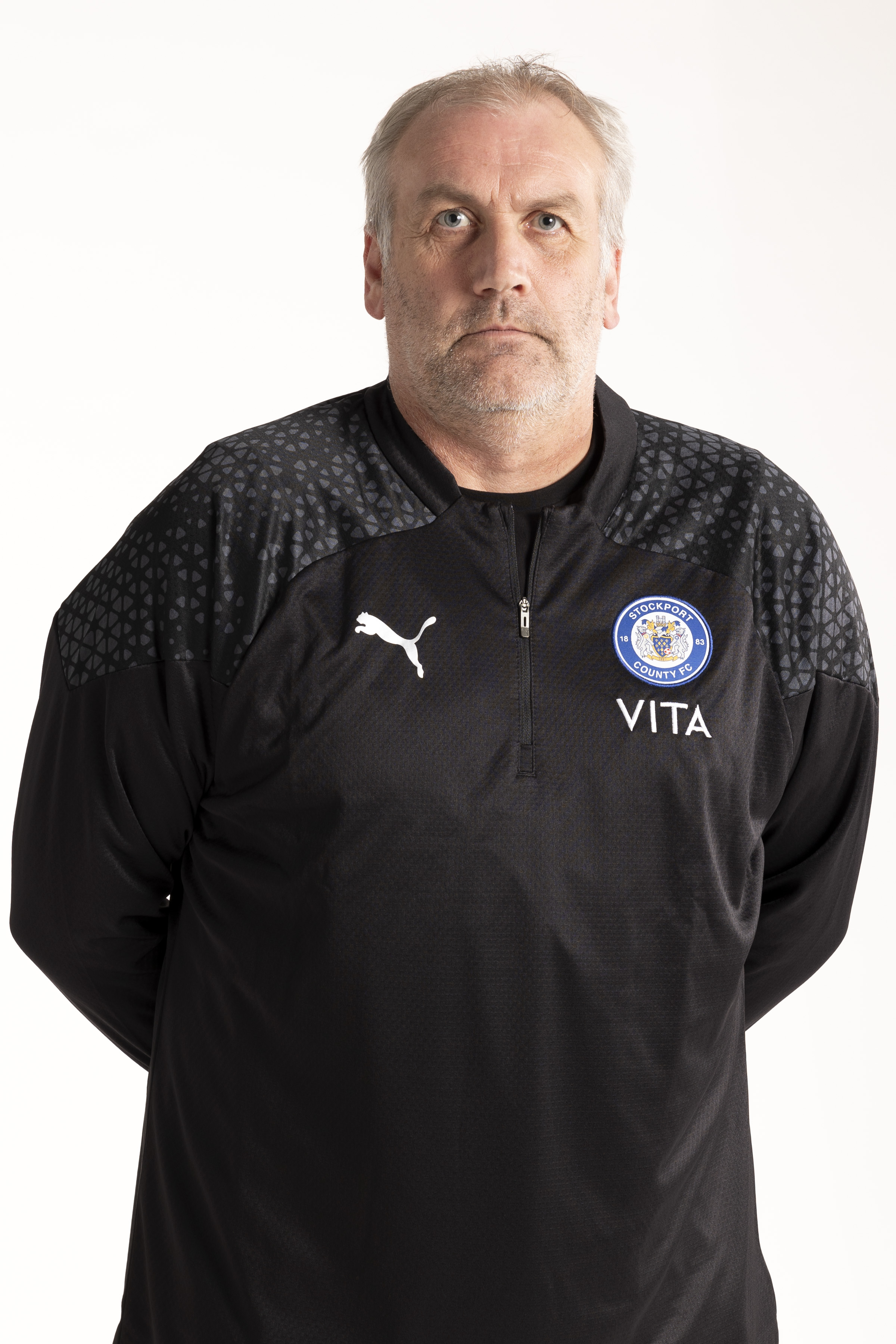
- Richard Landon, Stockport County FC

Personal information
- Full name: Richard John Landon
- Date of birth: 22 March 1970 (age 56)
- Place of birth: Worthing, England
- Height: 1.91 m (6 ft 3 in)
- Position: Forward

Senior career*
Years	Team	Apps	(Gls)
	Atherstone United	10	(6)
–1993	Stratford Town	84	(76)
1993–1994	Bedworth United	19	(20)
1994–1995	Plymouth Argyle	30	(12)
1995–1997	Stockport County	13	(4)
1997	→ Macclesfield Town (loan)	30	(16)
1997	→ Rotherham United (loan)	8	(0)
1997–1999	Macclesfield Town	32	(9)
1998	→ Hednesford Town (loan)		
1999–2001	Altrincham	34	(16)
2000–2001	→ Droylsden (loan)		
2001	→ Vauxhall Motors (loan)		
2001-2003	Radcliffe Borough	86	(23)
- * Club domestic league appearances and goals

Richard John Landon (born 22 March 1970) is an English former footballer who played as a forward. He made 83 appearances in the Football League for Plymouth Argyle, Stockport County, Rotherham United and Macclesfield Town.

== Life and career ==
Landon combined his job as a part-time player with an office job before entering the professional game. While at his desk, he was told he had phone call waiting from Peter Shilton, who had spotted him playing for Bedworth United. He almost did not take the call, believing it to be a wind-up. He accepted an offer of a trial from Plymouth Argyle and impressed, which led to a £30,000 transfer. He scored five goals in his first eight appearances for the club, including a hat-trick in their 8–1 win at Hartlepool United on 7 May 1994. The following season was a disappointing one for Landon, having suffered a number of injuries. He scored another seven goals before being sold to Stockport County for £150,000. Two spells with Macclesfield Town and one with Rotherham United followed before he finished his career back in non-league football. He returned to Stockport County after retiring from playing at Radcliffe Borough as the club's kit man. He has two sons, Jaidan and Zak and daughter Grace.
