= Shaun Goodwin =

English footballer and manager

Personal information
- Full name: Shaun Lee Goodwin
- Date of birth: 14 June 1969 (age 57)
- Place of birth: Rotherham, England
- Position: Midfielder

Senior career*
Years	Team	Apps	(Gls)
1987–1998	Rotherham United	280	(39)
1998–1999	Doncaster Rovers	8	(5)
1999–?	Altrincham	13	(0)
	Gainsborough Trinity	?	(?)

Managerial career
- 2002–2005: Maltby Main
- * Club domestic league appearances and goals

Shaun Lee Goodwin (born 14 June 1969) is an English former footballer and manager.

== Career ==
Goodwin started his career with Rotherham United in July 1987. He made 280 appearances and scored 39 goals in the Football League for the club before joining non-league side Doncaster Rovers. Whilst at Rotherham he was a part of the team that won the 1996 Football League Trophy Final. He also played for Altrincham and Gainsborough Trinity.

He was appointed as Maltby Main's manager in 2002 and left the club in January 2005.

== Honours ==
Rotherham United

- Football League Fourth Division: 1988–89
- Football League Trophy: 1995–96

Individual

- PFA Team of the Year: 1989–90 Third Division, 1991–92 Fourth Division
