= Junior McDougald =

English footballer

Personal information
- Full name: David Eugene Junior McDougald
- Date of birth: 12 January 1975 (age 51)
- Place of birth: Big Spring, TX, United States
- Height: 5 ft 11 in (1.80 m)
- Position: Striker

Team information
- Current team: St Ives Town

Youth career
- 1993–1994: Tottenham Hotspur

Senior career*
Years	Team	Apps	(Gls)
1994–1996	Brighton & Hove Albion	95	(22)
1996	→ Chesterfield (loan)	9	(3)
1996–1997	Rotherham United	20	(2)
1997–1998	SC Toulon	8	(1)
1998	Millwall	1	(0)
1998–1999	Leyton Orient	10	(0)
1999–2003	Dagenham & Redbridge	116	(30)
2003–2005	Canvey Island		
2005–2007	Kettering Town		
2007–2008	Histon		
2008–2009	St Ives Town	2	(1)
2009	Rushden & Higham United	2	(0)

International career
2001–2002	England National Game XI	5	(1)
- * Club domestic league appearances and goals as of 13 October 2008

David Eugene Junior McDougald (born 12 January 1975) is a former footballer. Born in the United States, he represented England at junior international level. He has also enjoyed a career as an actor.

== Football career ==
McDougald has played professional football in England for Tottenham Hotspur, Brighton & Hove Albion, Chesterfield, Rotherham United, Millwall, Leyton Orient, Dagenham & Redbridge, Canvey Island, Kettering Town and Histon, as well as in France for SC Toulon. He has also represented the National Game XI.

On 6 October 2008, McDougald signed for St Ives Town in the United Counties Football League Premier Division making his debut for the club as a second-half substitute against local rivals St Neots Town in the Hinchingbrooke Cup. McDougald made an immediate impact and was instrumental in turning around a 2–0 deficit to force the game into extra time. St Ives eventually won the game 4–3 with McDougald scoring two goals. On 3 April McDougald was reported on the St Ives Town FC website scoring against Boston Town after 15 minutes in a 5–1 win.

McDougald played twice for United Counties League Division One outfit Rushden & Higham United in November 2009.

== Acting career ==
McDougald acted in 31 episodes of Dream Team between 2001 and 2006.
