= Gary Bowyer =

English football player and coach

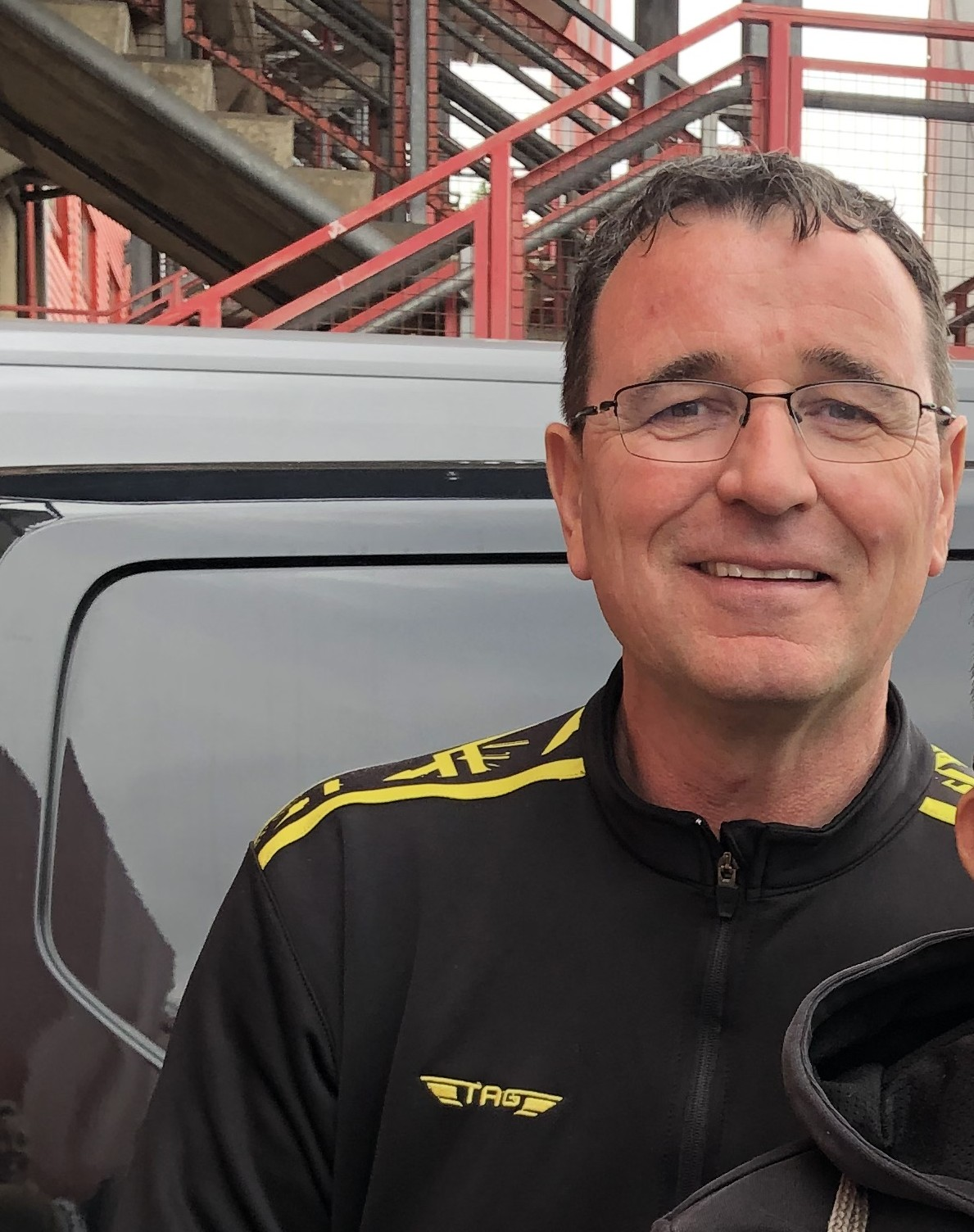
- Bowyer with Burton Albion in 2025.

Personal information
- Full name: Gary David Bowyer
- Date of birth: 22 June 1971 (age 55)
- Place of birth: Manchester, England
- Position: Full-back

Team information
- Current team: Burton Albion (manager)

Youth career
- Westfields

Senior career*
Years	Team	Apps	(Gls)
1989–1990	Hereford United	14	(2)
1990–1995	Nottingham Forest	0	(0)
1995–1997	Rotherham United	38	(2)
Total		52	(4)

Managerial career
- 2012–2013: Blackburn Rovers (caretaker)
- 2013: Blackburn Rovers (caretaker)
- 2013–2015: Blackburn Rovers
- 2016–2018: Blackpool
- 2019–2020: Bradford City
- 2021–2022: Salford City
- 2022–2023: Dundee
- 2024–: Burton Albion
- * Club domestic league appearances and goals

Gary David Bowyer (born 22 June 1971) is an English professional football coach and former player who is manager of EFL League One club Burton Albion.

As a player, he made 52 league appearances for Hereford United, Nottingham Forest and Rotherham United in a professional career that lasted eight years, before retiring due to injury in 1997, aged 25. He won the Football League Trophy with Rotherham United in 1995–96, his only honour as a player.

After working as a coach at a number of clubs, he has managed Blackburn Rovers, Blackpool, Bradford City and Salford City (twice). He guided Blackpool to promotion, via the play-offs, from League Two to League One in 2016–17.

== Early and personal life ==
Bowyer was born on 22 June 1971 in Manchester, Lancashire, England. His father, Ian, was also a professional footballer; the two played together at Hereford United.

He is a graduate of Manchester Metropolitan University's Masters of Sport Directorship programme.

== Playing career ==
After playing in non-League football for Westfields, Bowyer, a full-back, signed for Football League team Hereford United on non-contract terms, making 14 appearances in the 1989–90 season. After the season ended, Bowyer moved to Nottingham Forest, but he did not make a senior Football League appearance for club. Bowyer later signed for Rotherham United, making 38 appearances in the League over the next two seasons, before retiring due to injury at the age of 25. Whilst at Rotherham he was a part of the team that won the 1996 Football League Trophy final.

== Coaching career ==
=== Early career ===
After retiring as a player, Bowyer began his coaching career working part-time at Ilkeston, before being appointed as under-17s coach at Derby County, where he spent six years as an academy coach. He then became under-18s coach for Blackburn Rovers in 2004. He became their reserve-team manager in 2008, and in December 2012 he was appointed as caretaker manager following the dismissal of Henning Berg, steering them to a 3–1 victory over Barnsley in his first game in charge. It was later announced that Bowyer would remain in charge until the end of January 2013. Bowyer was re-appointed caretaker manager on 19 March 2013, following the dismissal of Michael Appleton, until the end of the season; however, on 26 March Bowyer said he was unsure how long he would remain in the position, in case the club hired a new permanent manager, and on 8 April Bowyer was summoned to India for a meeting with the club's owners. Bowyer was appointed the permanent manager of Blackburn on 24 May 2013, on a 12-month rolling contract.

In September 2015, he called for goal-line technology to be implemented. On 10 November 2015, Bowyer was dismissed as manager of Blackburn Rovers.

=== Blackpool and Bradford City spells ===
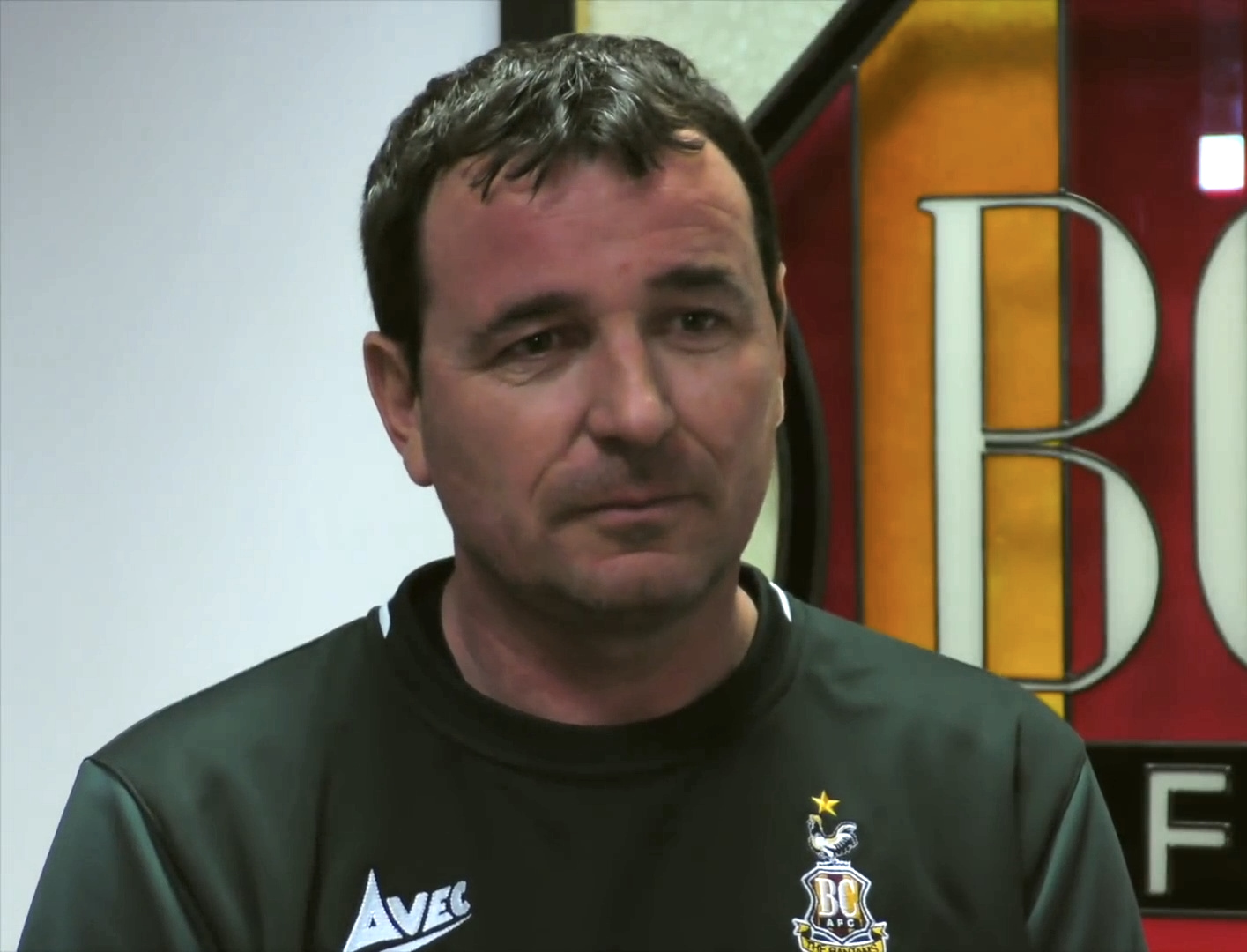
Bowyer with Bradford City in 2019.

On 1 June 2016, Bowyer was appointed as manager of Blackpool on a one-year rolling contract, following the club's relegation to EFL League Two. On 28 May 2017, Bowyer guided Blackpool to an immediate return to EFL League One in his first season in charge after his side beat Exeter City 2–1 in the League Two play-off final. He resigned as Blackpool manager on 6 August 2018.

In February 2019 he was linked with the vacant managerial position at Bradford City. On 4 March, Bowyer replaced David Hopkin as Bantams manager, signing a contract until the end of the season, with Andy Todd as his assistant. Bowyer retained the club's other coaching staff—including Martin Drury, who had been caretaker manager prior to his appointment— and said that all of City's squad players would have a chance to fight for a first-team place. In April, he signed a new contract with Bradford City until 2021. He was nominated for the League Two Manager of the Month award for October, but later said he was not a "fan" of such awards. Bowyer was dismissed by Bradford City on 3 February 2020.

=== Derby County youth and Salford City ===
He joined Derby County, as coach of their under-23s side, in September 2020. On 23 March 2021, it was announced that Bowyer was to become manager of League Two side Salford City on a deal lasting until the end of the season, replacing Richie Wellens. The deal came after an arrangement was reached between Salford co-owner Gary Neville and Derby manager Wayne Rooney, whereby Salford would pay no fee to Derby but would pay his wages for the duration of his spell in charge. The move has been described as the first ever managerial loan. His first game in charge was on 27 March, a 1–0 away defeat to Exeter City, and picked up his first win on 5 April, two Ian Henderson goals giving Salford a 2–0 win against Forest Green Rovers. After achieving 17 points from eight matches to help boost his side's play-off aspirations, Bowyer was awarded the League Two Manager of the Month award for April. On 10 May he returned to his role as an academy coach at Derby County; however, two days later on 12 May, it was announced that he had returned to manage Salford City after signing a two-year contract. On 2 August, Billy Barr joined as his assistant manager.

On 21 August 2021, he was booked for shoving Jonny Williams of Swindon Town in a 1–0 defeat, Salford's fourth game without a win at the beginning of the season, the club's worst start to a season since the 2014 takeover.

On 17 May 2022, Bowyer was dismissed by Salford having narrowly missed out on the play-offs.

=== Dundee ===
On 8 June 2022, Bowyer was appointed manager of Scottish Championship club Dundee. The Dundee board said they liked his youth strategy and success at Blackpool. Bowyer was named the Scottish Championship's Manager of the Month for November 2022, with his team having won every game that month. He would win the award again for March 2023, as he led the club on a promotion push and would win the Scottish Championship with Dundee at the end of the season.

On 10 May 2023, Bowyer was named as the SPFL Scottish Championship Manager of the Year. Later that day, Bowyer departed Dundee as manager, alongside assistant Billy Barr.

=== Burton Albion ===
On 17 December 2024, Bowyer was named head coach of League One side Burton Albion. At the time of his appointment, the club were sitting in 23rd position, nine points from safety. He guided the club to safety, in what the BBC described as a "miracle". On 6 June 2025, he signed a new two-year contract with the club.

== Managerial statistics ==
As of match played 21 November 2026

Managerial record by team and tenure
Team	From	To	Record					Ref.
Team	From	To	P	W	D	L	Win %	Ref.
Blackburn Rovers (caretaker)	27 December 2012	11 January 2013	4	3	1	0	75.0	
Blackburn Rovers	19 March 2013	10 November 2015	127	44	46	37	34.6	
Blackpool	1 June 2016	6 August 2018	115	42	40	33	36.5	
Bradford City	4 March 2019	3 February 2020	48	14	15	19	29.2	
Salford City	23 March 2021	17 May 2022	63	27	16	20	42.9	
Dundee	8 June 2022	10 May 2023	48	26	14	8	54.2	
Burton Albion	17 December 2024	Present	103	31	31	41	30.1	
Total			507	186	163	158	36.7	

== Honours ==
=== Player ===
Rotherham United

- Football League Trophy: 1995–96

=== Manager ===
Blackpool

- EFL League Two play-offs: 2017

Dundee

- Scottish Championship: 2022–23

Individual

- EFL League Two Manager of the Month: April 2021
- Scottish Championship Manager of the Month: November 2022, March 2023
- Scottish Championship Manager of the Year: 2022–23
