= Darran Rowbotham =

Welsh footballer

Personal information
- Full name: Darran Rowbotham
- Date of birth: 22 October 1966 (age 60)
- Place of birth: Cardiff, Wales
- Height: 5 ft 10 in (1.78 m)
- Position: Striker

Youth career
- 1983–1984: Plymouth Argyle

Senior career*
Years	Team	Apps	(Gls)
1984–1987	Plymouth Argyle	46	(2)
1987–1991	Exeter City	118	(46)
1991–1992	Torquay United	14	(3)
1992–1993	Birmingham City	36	(6)
1992	→ Mansfield Town (loan)	4	(2)
1993	→ Hereford United (loan)	8	(2)
1993–1995	Crewe Alexandra	61	(21)
1995–1996	Shrewsbury Town	40	(9)
1996	→ Exeter City (loan)	2	(1)
1996–2000	Exeter City	118	(37)
1999	→ Leyton Orient (loan)	6	(0)
2000–2002	Weymouth		
- * Club domestic league appearances and goals

Darran Rowbotham (born 22 October 1966) is a Welsh former footballer who made more than 450 appearances in the Football League playing as a striker.

== Career ==
Rowbotham was born in Cardiff, Wales. He began his career as a junior with Plymouth Argyle, and turned professional with the club in November 1984. Three years later he joined local rivals Exeter City. A key player in Exeter winning the Fourth Division title in the 1989–90 season, his goalscoring had linked him with possible moves to top-flight football. However, he sustained a serious knee injury which kept him out of football for a year, after which his career was restricted to the lower divisions of the Football League.

After four years at Exeter, where he scored 58 goals in 142 games in all competitions, he joined Torquay United for a fee of £25,000. Only four months later he moved on again, following his former Exeter manager Terry Cooper to Birmingham City for a fee of £20,000.

Lack of goals for Birmingham resulted in loan spells at Mansfield Town and Hereford United before he left on a free transfer, signing for Crewe Alexandra before the 1993–94 season. He spent two years there, followed by an 18-month spell at Shrewsbury Town, before returning to Exeter in 1996. He remained at Exeter for four years, including a month on loan to Leyton Orient, before being released at the end of the 1999–2000 season. He ended his career playing alongside brother Jason for Weymouth in the Southern League.

== Honours ==
Exeter City

- Football League Fourth Division: 1989–90

Individual

- PFA Team of the Year: 1989–90 Fourth Division
