= John McGlashan (footballer) =

Scottish footballer and manager (1967–2018)

Personal information
- Full name: John McGlashan
- Date of birth: 3 June 1967
- Place of birth: Dundee, Scotland
- Date of death: 10 January 2018 (aged 50)
- Height: 6 ft 1 in (1.85 m)
- Position: Midfielder

Senior career*
Years	Team	Apps	(Gls)
- Dundee Violet
1988–1990	Montrose	68	(10)
1990–1993	Millwall	16	(0)
1992–1993	→ Fulham (loan)	5	(1)
1993	→ Cambridge United (loan)	1	(0)
1993–1994	Peterborough United	46	(3)
1994–1997	Rotherham United	74	(5)
1997–1998	Dundee	8	(1)
1998	→ Arbroath (loan)	14	(2)
1998–2000	Ross County	33	(10)
2000–2005	Arbroath	120	(25)
2005	Dundee Violet		
2005–2007	Arbroath	2	(0)
Total		387	(57)

Managerial career
- 1991-1993: Millwall Lionesses
- 2005: Dundee Violet
- 2005–2009: Arbroath
- 2011–2014: Tayport
- 2014: Dundee Violet
- * Club domestic league appearances and goals

John McGlashan (3 June 1967 – 10 January 2018) was a Scottish football player and manager.

== Playing career ==
In a long professional career, he played for nine clubs. He started his senior career in 1988 with Montrose, scoring some goals from a midfield position. This earned him a £50,000 move to London club Millwall in 1990. After loan spells with Fulham and Cambridge United, McGlashan moved to Peterborough United for £75,000 in 1993. A year later McGlashan moved to Rotherham United, where he stayed for three years. Whilst at Rotherham he was a part of the team that won the 1996 Football League Trophy Final. McGlashan returned to Scottish football in the summer of 1997, signing for Dundee. He made 11 appearances and scored two goals as Dundee won promotion to the Scottish Premier League in his first season with the club. Manager Jocky Scott made many changes to the squad after the club was promoted, and McGlashan was loaned to Arbroath and then moved to Ross County. He returned to Arbroath on a permanent basis in August 2000, and he made over 100 appearances in five years there.

== Coaching career ==
McGlashan had a spell as manager of Millwall Lionesses during his time in London.

In the summer of 2005, McGlashan returned to Dundee Violet as player/manager. His father, also John, had been captain of Dundee Violet. In September 2005, Harry Cairney resigned as Arbroath manager and McGlashan was appointed as his replacement. The following month McGlashan made himself his first signing, re–registering as a player despite missing most of the previous season with a back injury. He made a further two league appearances for the club, over the next two seasons. He managed Arbroath for four years before resigning in October 2009.

McGlashan later managed Tayport and Dundee Violet.

McGlashan died on 10 January 2018, of Motor Neurone Disease.

== Honours ==
Rotherham United

- Football League Trophy: 1995–96
