= Peter Wilding =

English footballer

Personal information
- Full name: Peter John Wilding
- Date of birth: 28 November 1968 (age 57)
- Place of birth: Shrewsbury, England
- Height: 6 ft 1 in (1.85 m)
- Position: Midfielder

Senior career*
| Years | Team | Apps | (Gls) |
| 1996–1997 | Telford United | ? | (?) |
| 1997–2003 | Shrewsbury Town | 171 | (7) |
| 2003–2004 | Welshpool Town | ? | (?) |
- * Club domestic league appearances and goals

Peter John Wilding (born 28 November 1968) is a former professional footballer for Telford United and Shrewsbury Town. Originally a midfielder, Wilding became somewhat of a utility player during his time at Shrewsbury, playing in every position during his six-year stay at Gay Meadow. He played as a goalkeeper when he deputised for the injured Paul Edwards in a match against Torquay United on 18 December 1998.

== Playing career ==
Wilding spent much of his playing career in the Shrewsbury local leagues; however, his good form led him to sign with then–Conference National side Telford United in 1996. After one-and-a-half seasons, Telford manager Jake King was appointed manager at neighbouring Shrewsbury Town. One of King's first acts as Shrewsbury manager was to sign Wilding from Telford for £10,000 in August 1997.

Wilding was to play under two managers during his stay at Shrewsbury: Jake King, and later Kevin Ratcliffe. While not one of the big names in the Shrewsbury squad, the hometown player endeared himself to Shrewsbury fans with his dependable, workmanlike performances.

Arguably Wilding's finest season was the 2002-03 season. In the FA Cup third round, Shrewsbury famously defeated Everton 2–1. While Nigel Jemson grabbed most of the headlines by scoring both goals, Wilding had a superb game, completely marking Wayne Rooney out of the game. Sadly for Shrewsbury, their form dipped in the latter half of the season, eventually finishing bottom of the Football League Third Division. Despite this, Wilding was seen as one of the side's best players that season, and escaped much of the intense criticism levelled at some of his 'big name' teammates.

Following relegation, Ratcliffe resigned, and Wilding was one of the few players to be offered a new contract by Ratcliffe's replacement Jimmy Quinn. Feeling unhappy with the terms of the contract, Wilding opted to reject it, and retired from professional football. Wilding later signed for League of Wales side Welshpool Town before retiring from football in 2004. He went on to run a plastering business in Shrewsbury - his job before turning pro - while still being the adulation of those who saw him play. And while he may not have been the most gifted footballer, he was the "local boy, done good" who gave his all, and didn't stop trying. In June 2010, Pete re-joined the club as Assistant Manager of the YouthTeam.

== Scouting career ==
Wilding worked as U16-U23s Head of Recruitment at Stoke City from June 2013 to August 2020.
