= David Johnson (footballer, born 1970) =

English footballer

Personal information
- Full name: David Alan Johnson
- Date of birth: 29 October 1970 (age 56)
- Place of birth: Dinnington, England
- Height: 6 ft 2 in (1.88 m)
- Position: Forward

Youth career
- –: Sheffield Wednesday

Senior career*
Years	Team	Apps	(Gls)
1991–1993	Sheffield Wednesday	6	(0)
1991	→ Hartlepool United (loan)	7	(2)
1992	→ Hartlepool United (loan)	3	(0)
1993–1996	Lincoln City	89	(13)
1996–Luton	Altrincham		
2012–2013	Thundridge City	20	(2)
- * Club domestic league appearances and goals

David Alan Johnson (born 29 October 1970 in Dinnington, West Riding of Yorkshire) is an English former professional footballer who scored 15 goals from 105 appearances in the Football League playing as a forward for Sheffield Wednesday, Hartlepool United (in two separate loan spells), and Lincoln City. He was Lincoln's leading scorer in the 1993–94 season with 13 goals in all competitions. After leaving Lincoln in 1996, he joined the Conference club Altrincham.

Dave took a break from football after leaving Altrincham. After the break he joined Thundridge City FC as a player-coach, his most memorable moment being his overhead kick in a league match. He has now taken on a full coaching role for the club and has led the team to two top half finishes, two seasons in a row. Thundridge City FC earned promotion in the 2015/16 season.

Despite Johnson enjoying early success with Thundridge, he has recently found himself under pressure from the club's board following a poor first half of the 2016/17 season. Dubbed the "Yorkshire Ranieri", he matches the Italian's Leicester record in finding success one season, followed by disappointment the next.
