= Trevor Berry =

English footballer

Personal information
- Full name: Trevor John Berry
- Date of birth: 1 August 1974 (age 52)
- Place of birth: Haslemere, England
- Position: Midfielder

Senior career*
Years	Team	Apps	(Gls)
1991–1992	Bournemouth	0	(0)
1992–1995	Aston Villa	0	(0)
1995	→ Rotherham United (loan)	0	(0)
1995–2002	Rotherham United	168	(18)
2001	→ Scunthorpe United (loan)	6	(1)
2002–2003	Waterford United	?	(?)
Total		174	(19)
- * Club domestic league appearances and goals

Trevor John Berry (born 1 August 1974) in Haslemere, England, is an English retired professional footballer who played as a midfielder mostly for Rotherham United. Whilst at Rotherham he was a part of the team that won the 1996 Football League Trophy Final.

== Honours ==
Rotherham United

- Football League Trophy: 1995–96
