= Paul Blades =

English footballer

Personal information
- Full name: Paul Andrew Blades
- Date of birth: 5 January 1965 (age 61)
- Place of birth: Peterborough, England
- Height: 6 ft 0 in (1.83 m)
- Position: Defender

Senior career*
| Years | Team | Apps | (Gls) |
| 1982–1990 | Derby County | 166 | (1) |
| 1990–1992 | Norwich City | 47 | (0) |
| 1992–1995 | Wolverhampton Wanderers | 107 | (2) |
| 1995–1997 | Rotherham United | 43 | (2) |
| 1997–1998 | Hednesford Town | ? | (?) |

International career
| 1983 | England Youth | 1 | (0) |
- * Club domestic league appearances and goals

Paul Andrew Blades (born 5 January 1965) is an English former professional footballer. He was a defender who played for Derby County, Norwich City, Wolverhampton Wanderers and Rotherham United. Now Paul works for the health and safety side of Manstal Electrical in Birmingham.

== Career ==
Blades attended Walton School in Peterborough. He began his career as a trainee at Derby County, making his league debut as a 17-year-old on 18 September 1982 in a 2–1 defeat at Leeds United. He remained with the club throughout the 1980s, enduring relegation to the Third Division in 1984 but also two successive promotions that took him to the top flight in 1987. He formed a formidable centre back partnership with Mark Wright which supported a midfield containing Trevor Hebberd and Ted McMinn as well as the high scoring centre forward Dean Saunders as the Rams finished fifth in the league in 1988–89 season and only missed out on a UEFA Cup place because of the ban on English clubs in European competitions that was the sequel to the Heysel disaster of 1985.

After three seasons at the highest level, he finally left the Baseball Ground for Norwich City in July 1990. He had played for them 166 times in the league and scored once, his only goal coming in the successful 1988–89 campaign.

At the time of his transfer to Norwich in the summer of 1990, he was the club's record signing at £700,000, and went on to make 62 appearances for the Canaries over two seasons. In his final season he helped Norwich reach the semi-finals of the FA Cup, where defeat to second flight Sunderland prevented them from reaching the final for the first time in their history.

He joined Wolves in August 1992 for £325,000. He made 117 appearances for the Midlanders in total during a three-season spell. His final season saw the club qualify for the play-offs, but they lost to Bolton.

Blades was sold after this failure to win promotion to third flight Rotherham United for £110,000, making him their record signing at the time. Whilst at Rotherham he was a part of the team that won the 1996 Football League Trophy Final. However, his second season saw the club relegated and he was released, whereupon he joined Conference side Hednesford Town.

== Honours ==
Rotherham United

- Football League Trophy: 1995–96
