= Neil Richardson (footballer) =

English footballer

Personal information
- Full name: Neil Thomas Richardson
- Date of birth: 3 March 1968 (age 58)
- Place of birth: Sunderland, England
- Height: 6 ft 0 in (1.83 m)
- Position: Centre back

Senior career*
Years	Team	Apps	(Gls)
1988–1989	Brandon United	?	(?)
1989–1999	Rotherham United	185	(9)
1996	→ Exeter City (loan)	14	(0)
1999–2000	Mansfield Town	31	(0)
- * Club domestic league appearances and goals

Neil Thomas Richardson (born 3 March 1968) is an English former footballer who played as a centre back.

== Playing career ==
Richardson joined Rotherham United from Brandon United in August 1989. He had a loan at Exeter City in 1996. Whilst at Rotherham, he was a part of the team that won the 1996 Football League Trophy Final. After making 226 appearances and scoring 12 goals for Rotherham, he joined Mansfield Town in August 1999. He retired from playing after making 35 appearances for the club.

== Coaching career ==
After being a coach at Mansfield Town, he became the Boston United head of youth football in April 2005. He worked as caretaker youth coach at York City in 2006 after Ian Kerr was suffering from illness,

== Honours ==
Rotherham United

- Football League Trophy: 1995–96
