= Darren Garner =

English footballer

Personal information
- Full name: Darren John Garner
- Date of birth: 10 December 1971 (age 54)
- Place of birth: Plymouth, Devon, England
- Position: Midfielder

Team information
- Current team: Launceston

Youth career
- 1987–1989: Plymouth Argyle

Senior career*
Years	Team	Apps	(Gls)
1989–1994	Plymouth Argyle	27	(1)
1994–1995	Dorchester Town		
1995–2005	Rotherham United	265	(23)
2005	→ Torquay United (loan)	9	(0)
2005–2006	Torquay United	51	(3)
2006–2007	Newport County	9	(0)
2007	Launceston		
2007	Truro City	11	(2)
2007	Bodmin Town		
2007–	Launceston		
- * Club domestic league appearances and goals as of 20 June 2007

Darren John Garner (born 10 December 1971 in Plymouth) is an English professional footballer. He currently plays for Launceston F.C.

Garner began his professional football career as a trainee with Plymouth Argyle, turning professional in March 1989. He moved to non-league Dorchester Town on a free transfer in August 1994 and in June 1995 moved to Rotherham United for a fee of £30,000.

In ten years at Rotherham, in which he played over 250 games, he helped the Millers to two promotions and an Auto Windscreen Shield in 1996, but fell out of favour with both his manager and the club's fans in February 2005 after being substituted in a game at home to Nottingham Forest. The hand gestures he gave while leaving the field were reported by the Fourth Official, leading to FA charges and a £500 fine.

The following month Garner moved to Torquay United on loan until the end of the season, failing to prevent Torquay's relegation. He joined Torquay on a free transfer in June 2005, playing in a side almost relegated for a second successive season.

In June 2006 he was given in 3-month contract extension, but in October 2006 was told by Torquay manager Ian Atkins that he would be released at the end of November. He left Torquay in early November having agreed a settlement for the end of his contract. He signed for Newport County on 7 November 2006. He first featured for County as a sub against Swansea City in the FA Cup 1st round proper. He joined Cornish non-league side Launceston after being released by Newport in March 2007.

However, Garner joined Truro City later the same month. He left Truro in the summer of 2007 to join Bodmin Town, but left Bodmin in September 2007 to re-join Launceston.

On 14 February 2009 Garner had his debut as Manager for Launceston, after the resignation of Paul Smith.

== Honours ==
Rotherham United

- Football League Trophy: 1995–96
