= Ian Breckin =

English footballer (born 1975)

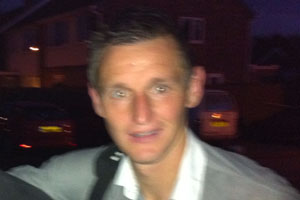
- Breckin in 2010

Personal information
- Full name: Ian Breckin
- Date of birth: 24 July 1975 (age 51)
- Place of birth: Rotherham, England
- Position: Central defender

Senior career*
Years	Team	Apps	(Gls)
1993–1997	Rotherham United	132	(6)
1997–2002	Chesterfield	212	(8)
2002–2005	Wigan Athletic	96	(0)
2005–2009	Nottingham Forest	143	(12)
2009–2011	Chesterfield	64	(0)
Total		647	(26)
- * Club domestic league appearances and goals

Ian Breckin (born 24 July 1975) is an English former professional footballer. He is now head coach at Wickersley Wanderers.

== Playing career ==
=== Early career ===
Born on 24 July 1975, in Rotherham, Breckin started his career with his hometown club Rotherham United as a trainee, before signing pro in 1993. He made over 130 appearances for them and scored six goals. He was then sold to Chesterfield for £100,000 in 1997. He spent five years at Saltergate, making over 200 appearances.

He moved to Wigan Athletic in 2002 and became a key player in the side that won promotion to the Premier League. During his time at the club he became a fans favourite for his passionate performances and outstanding defending, earning him the nickname "Breckinbauer" (a reference to German footballer Franz Beckenbauer).

=== Nottingham Forest ===
He never got the chance to play in the Premier League and instead signed for League One side Nottingham Forest, in a £350,000 deal, with his teammate Nicky Eaden joining him on a free transfer. He never scored in a Wigan shirt but he was the top scorer for Nottingham Forest as he reached the target he set with 10 goals.

Shortly after he arrived at the City Ground he was made team captain, after Gareth Taylor put in a string of poor performances and was dropped from the first team. He made more appearances for Forest than any other player in the 2005–06 season. Breckin has been solid at the centre of defence while pairing up with Wes Morgan and was the most consistent performer for Forest in the 2005–06 season, scoring a total of ten goals. At the end of April 2006, he was crowned Nottingham Forest's Player of the Year, receiving 42% of the votes from Forest fans. He also won the Football League One Player of the Month for April.

Breckin missed the start of the 2007–08 campaign with an injury after two years playing in every Forest league game. But he recovered and was recalled to the first-team following the injury of Wes Morgan and helped Forest into second spot at Christmas and scored his first goal of the season in Forest's 4–1 home win against Southend United. Breckin made his 100th Forest league appearance in their 2–0 victory against Crewe Alexandra, but was then dropped to the bench in favour of Wes Morgan, only making a handful of starts and coming off the bench often towards the end of the season. He did however help Forest keep a league record of 24 clean sheets in the 2007–08 season, helping them secure promotion to the Championship.

Breckin's contract with Nottingham Forest was due to end in the summer of 2009, but in December 2008 he was transfer-listed by the club. After manager Colin Calderwood was sacked however, Breckin put in impressive performances under John Pemberton and Billy Davies, and after the 2–0 home win to Plymouth Argyle he was removed from the transfer list. However, Billy Davies stated on the club's official website that Breckin would play his last game for Nottingham Forest in the club's end of season finale against Southampton, as he would not be renewing Breckin's contract.

Breckin was given a standing ovation following the Southampton game, which Nottingham Forest, won 3–1.

=== Chesterfield ===
Breckin rejoined Chesterfield on 25 June 2009 and was appointed club captain. Breckin was released from Chesterfield at the end of the 2010–11 season, and on retirement joined Wickersley Wanderers, a Rotherham-based children's football club, as head coach.

== Personal life ==
Breckin's son, Kian, is also a professional footballer and has progressed through Manchester City's academy, having first joined the club in 2015. On 11 July 2023, Kian joined League One club Wycombe Wanderers on loan. Ian also has a daughter, Ava, who is travelling around the globe in a different sport, cheerleading.

== Honours ==
Rotherham United

- Football League Trophy: 1995–96

Wigan Athletic

- Football League Second Division: 2002–03
- Football League Championship runner-up: 2004–05

Nottingham Forest

- Football League One runner-up: 2007–08

Chesterfield

- Football League Two: 2010–11

Individual

- PFA Team of the Year: 2006–07 Football League One
- Football League One Player of the Month: April 2006
