= Nick Ward (footballer, born 1977) =

Welsh footballer

Personal information
- Date of birth: 30 November 1977 (age 48)
- Place of birth: Wrexham, Wales
- Position: Midfielder

Senior career*
Years	Team	Apps	(Gls)
1996–1998	Shrewsbury Town	19	(1)
1997	→ Telford United (loan)	2	(0)
1998–2000	Newtown	?	(?)
2000–2007	The New Saints	190	(69)
2007–2008	Welling United	5	(0)
2008–2009	NEWI Cefn Druids	6	(4)
2009–2010	Newtown	26	(5)
2010–2011	Bangor City	34	(3)
2011–2012	The New Saints	18	(3)
2012–2013	Newtown		
2013	Conwy Borough		
2013	Airbus UK Broughton		
2013–2014	Cefn Druids		
2016–	Brickfield Rangers		

Managerial career
- 2014: Penycae (Assistant Manager)
- 2014–?: Penycae
- 2018–2019: Brickfield Rangers
- * Club domestic league appearances and goals as of 08:09, 3 March 2012 (UTC)

Nicholas Ward (born 30 November 1977 in Wrexham, Wales), is a retired footballer who played as a forward for Shrewsbury Town in The Football League. He played in the Welsh Premier League for a number of team - where he spent most of his career. After retiring as a player he moved into management and is currently manager of Penycae.

He made his debut for the Shrews on 15 October 1996 in the Second Division 2–1 defeat to Gillingham at Gay Meadow. He came on as a second-half substitute for Richard Scott.

In June 2011 he rejoined The New Saints signing a new contract with the club in May 2012.

On deadline day – 31 August 2012, he left TNS re-signing with his former club Newtown, for a third time.

In October 2013 he joined former club Cefn Druids.

He retired from football in the summer of 2014 to further his coaching career and joined Penycae as assistant manager. He was appointed manager of the club later that season.

On 3 June 2016 it has been announced that Nicky will be joining Brickfield Rangers as a Player Coach. In June 2018 he was appointed manager of the club.

== Honours ==
- Welsh Premier League: Winners medal 2011–12 with The New Saints
- Welsh Premier League: Winners medal 2010–11 with Bangor City
- Welsh Cup Winners medal 2011–12 with The New Saints
