= Andy Roscoe =

English footballer (born 1973)

Personal information
- Full name: Andrew Ronald Roscoe
- Date of birth: 4 June 1973 (age 53)
- Place of birth: Liverpool, England
- Positions: Defender; winger

Youth career
- 1990–1991: Liverpool

Senior career*
Years	Team	Apps	(Gls)
1991–1994	Bolton Wanderers	5	(0)
1994–1999	Rotherham United	214	(19)
1999–2000	Mansfield Town	40	(3)
2000–2003	Exeter City	116	(11)
2003–2007	Leigh RMI	62	(1)
2007–200?	Atherton Laburnum Rovers	?	(?)
Total		437	(34)
- * Club domestic league appearances and goals

Andrew Ronald Roscoe (born 4 June 1973) is an English left sided defender or midfielder whose last job was as assistant manager at Leigh RMI having joined in 2003 from Exeter City. Roscoe has also played for Bolton, Mansfield, and Rotherham. He started his career at Liverpool. He has played for Liverpool in the Mersey Masters.

== Honours ==
Rotherham United

- Football League Trophy: 1995–96

Individual

- Leigh RMI Manager's Player of the Year: 2005–06
- Leigh RMI Players' Player of the Year: 2005–06
