= Tommy Lynch (footballer) =

Irish footballer and manager

Personal information
- Date of birth: 10 October 1964 (age 62)
- Place of birth: Limerick, Ireland
- Position: Defender

Senior career*
| Years | Team | Apps | (Gls) |
| 1987–1988 | Limerick | 0 | (0) |
| 1988–1990 | Sunderland | 4 | (0) |
| 1990–1996 | Shrewsbury Town | 234 | (14) |
| 1996–1998 | Waterford United | 68 | (4) |
| 1998–2000 | Limerick | 47 | (6) |

International career
| 1986 | League of Ireland XI | 8 | (0) |

Managerial career
- 1996–1998: Waterford United (player-manager)
- 1999–2000: Limerick (player-manager)
- 2003–2005: Kilkenny City
- * Club domestic league appearances and goals

Thomas Lynch (born 10 October 1964) is an Irish former footballer who played as a defender. He made his football league debut playing for Sunderland but after just four starts he was signed by Asa Hartford for Shrewsbury Town.

In August 2011, Lynch was inducted into the Shrewsbury Town players hall of fame, among the likes of Arthur Rowley, Graham Turner, Alf Wood and goalkeeper Ken Mulhearn.

In October 2016, Lynch was voted onto Town's greatest ever XI. As one of ten nominated left backs, he received 54% of the fans' vote. Along with the other 10 players who were voted onto the greatest XI, Lynch is depicted in graffiti form in The Salop Leisure Stand Concourse at The New Meadow.

== Honours ==
Shrewsbury Town

- Football League Third Division: 1993–94
- Football League Trophy runner-up: 1995–96
