= Dean Spink =

English footballer (born 1967)

Personal information
- Full name: Dean Peter Spink
- Date of birth: 22 January 1967 (age 59)
- Place of birth: Birmingham, England
- Height: 6 ft 1 in (1.85 m)
- Positions: Striker; defender

Senior career*
| Years | Team | Apps | (Gls) |
| 1988–1989 | Halesowen Town | | |
| 1989–1990 | Aston Villa | 0 | (0) |
| 1989 | Scarborough | 3 | (2) |
| 1990 | Bury | 6 | (1) |
| 1990–1997 | Shrewsbury Town | 273 | (53) |
| 1997–2000 | Wrexham | 85 | (9) |
| 1999 | Shrewsbury Town | 4 | (0) |
| 2000–2002 | Chester City | 21 | (2) |
| 2002 | Telford United | 3 | (0) |
| 2002–2003 | Kidsgrove Athletic | | |
| 2003 | Colwyn Bay | | |

Managerial career
- 2001–2002: Chester City (joint caretaker)
- * Club domestic league appearances and goals

Dean Peter Spink (born 22 January 1967) is an English former professional footballer who played either as a striker or a defender. After retiring as a player, he became a physiotherapist for Shrewsbury Town but is now one at Solihull Moors. He is currently the reserve manager at Alvechurch FC.

== Personal life ==
Since retiring Spink has ventured into nursery care and gym training, and returned to Shrewsbury initially as youth-team physiotherapist before getting promoted to first-team physio.

== Honours ==
Shrewsbury Town

- Football League Third Division: 1993–94
- Football League Trophy runner-up: 1995–96

Individual

- PFA Team of the Year: 1993–94 Third Division
- Voted Shrewsbury Town F.C.'s "all-time cult hero" by viewers of the BBC show Football Focus in 2004.
