= Paul Edwards (footballer, born 1965) =

English footballer

Personal information
- Date of birth: 22 February 1965 (age 61)
- Place of birth: Liverpool, England
- Position: Goalkeeper

Senior career*
Years	Team	Apps	(Gls)
- Leek Town
1988–1992	Crewe Alexandra	29	(0)
1992–2001	Shrewsbury Town	312	(0)
- Telford United
- Newtown
Total		341	(0)
- * Club domestic league appearances and goals

Paul Edwards (born 22 February 1965) is an English former professional footballer who played as a goalkeeper.

== Career ==
Born in Liverpool, Edwards began his career in non-League football with Leek Town, before playing in the Football League with Crewe Alexandra and Shrewsbury Town, making 341 League appearances between 1988 and 2001. Edwards later returned to non-League football with Telford United, and also played in Wales for Newtown.

== Honours ==
Shrewsbury Town

- Football League Third Division: 1993–94
- Football League Trophy runner-up: 1995–96
