= Nigel Jemson =

English footballer (born 1969)

Personal information
- Full name: Nigel Bradley Jemson
- Date of birth: 10 August 1969 (age 57)
- Place of birth: Hutton, Lancashire, England
- Height: 5 ft 11 in (1.80 m)
- Position: Striker

Senior career*
Years	Team	Apps	(Gls)
1986–1988	Preston North End	32	(8)
1988–1991	Nottingham Forest	47	(13)
1989	→ Bolton Wanderers (loan)	5	(0)
1989	→ Preston North End (loan)	9	(2)
1991–1994	Sheffield Wednesday	51	(9)
1993	→ Grimsby Town (loan)	6	(2)
1994–1996	Notts County	14	(1)
1995	→ Watford (loan)	4	(0)
1995	→ Coventry City (loan)	0	(0)
1996	→ Rotherham United (loan)	16	(5)
1996–1998	Oxford United	68	(27)
1998–1999	Bury	29	(1)
1999–2000	Ayr United	12	(5)
2000	Oxford United	18	(0)
2000–2003	Shrewsbury Town	109	(36)
2003–2004	Ballymena United	22	(7)
2004–2008	Ilkeston Town		
2008–2009	FC Halifax Town		
2009	Arnold Town	6	(1)
2009–2010	Rainworth Miners Welfare		
Total		420	(109)

International career
1990	England U21	1	(0)

Managerial career
- 2005–2008: Ilkeston Town (player-manager)
- 2009: FC Halifax Town (caretaker manager)
- * Club domestic league appearances and goals

Nigel Bradley Jemson (born 10 August 1969) is an English footballer, who represented his country at under-21 level and was the player-manager of Ilkeston Town until May 2008. He finished his career at Rainworth Miners Welfare in the Northern Counties East League Premier Division.

== Club career ==
Jemson played for a total of 12 English league clubs, most notably for Nottingham Forest and Sheffield Wednesday, one Scottish league club and one Northern Irish league club during his career, rarely lasting more than a season in each club. Arguably, the highlight of his career was the winning goal he scored in the 1990 League Cup Final for Nottingham Forest against Oldham Athletic, the only goal of the game.

Jemson made his league debut aged 16 in 1986 with Fourth Division Preston North End whom he had joined as a Y.T.S. lad. In March 1988 Jemson was signed by Brian Clough for Nottingham Forest for a fee of £150,000 but did not make his Forest league debut until season 1989-1990 after loan spells with Bolton Wanderers and old club Preston. In September 1991 Jemson was signed by Trevor Francis for Sheffield Wednesday for a fee of £800,000 and helped the club to a third-place finish. September 1994 saw a move back to Nottingham, this time joining Notts County for a fee of £300,000. During his time there, he had loan spells with Watford, Coventry City, and Rotherham United. In April 1996 he scored both Rotherham's goals in a 2–1 win over Shrewsbury Town, for whom he later played 109 games, in the Football League Trophy Final at Wembley Stadium. In 1996 Jemson was signed by Oxford United for a fee of £60,000 where he enjoyed two successful seasons. Moves to Bury, Ayr United, and a return to Oxford United followed before Jemson ended his English league career in 2003 after three successful seasons at Shrewsbury Town.

Jemson also gained national fame in January 2003, after scoring the Shrewsbury goals that knocked Everton out of the FA Cup third round. He put the Shrews into a first-half lead with a free kick and, after Niclas Alexandersson had equalised for Everton, glanced a last-minute header past Richard Wright, to give Shrewsbury a famous giant-killing victory. Having earlier scored once against Stafford Rangers and twice against Barrow, his two goals against Everton took his tally to 5 in the competition meaning he ended up as top scorer.

In 2010, he replaced Eoin Jess in the Nottingham Forest's Masters team for the 2010 HKFC International Soccer Sevens tournament.

== International career ==
Jemson was capped once for the England under-21s, in a 0–0 friendly against Wales under-21s in December 1990.

== Personal life ==
Jemson was born in Hutton, Lancashire and attended Hutton Grammar School.

In 2011, Jemson was reportedly training as a fireman in Bingham, Nottinghamshire. He also maintains his interest in football, working at Nottingham Forest as a match day host, and starting a blog about his former team in October 2011.

Jemson has also worked as a Business Development manager and Brand Ambassador for several businesses, currently with estate agents Pygott & Crone.

== Honours ==
Nottingham Forest

- Football League Cup: 1989–90

Rotherham United

- Football League Trophy: 1995–96
