= Mark Taylor (footballer, born 1966) =

English footballer

Personal information
- Full name: Robert Mark Taylor
- Date of birth: 22 February 1966 (age 60)
- Place of birth: Walsall, England
- Height: 5 ft 10 in (1.78 m)
- Position: Midfielder

Senior career*
Years	Team	Apps	(Gls)
1984–1989	Walsall	113	(4)
1989–1991	Sheffield Wednesday	9	(0)
1991	→ Shrewsbury Town (loan)	19	(2)
1991–1998	Shrewsbury Town	249	(13)
1998–2000	Hereford United	76	(3)
2000–2001	Nuneaton Borough	20	(0)
2001–2002	Halesowen Town	45	(2)
2002–2006	Redditch United		
2006–2008	Bromsgrove Rovers	29	(0)
2008	Rugby Town	4	(0)
- * Club domestic league appearances and goals

Robert Mark Taylor (born 22 February 1966 in Walsall), known as Mark Taylor, is an English former professional footballer who played as a midfielder in the Football League for Walsall, Sheffield Wednesday and Shrewsbury Town, and in non-league football for clubs including Hereford United, Nuneaton Borough, Halesowen Town, Redditch United, Bromsgrove Rovers and Rugby Town.

== Honours ==
Walsall

- Football League Third Division play-offs: 1988

Shrewsbury Town

- Football League Third Division: 1993–94
- Football League Trophy runner-up: 1995–96
