= 1996–97 Brighton & Hove Albion F.C. season =

1996–97 season of Brighton & Hove Albion

Brighton & Hove Albion
1996–97 season
- Chairman: Bill Archer
- Manager: Jimmy Case (until 4 December); Steve Gritt (from 11 December)
- Stadium: Goldstone Ground
- Third Division: 23rd
- FA Cup: First round
- League Cup: First round
- Football League Trophy: Second round
- Top goalscorer: League: Maskell (14); All: Maskell (16)
- Average home league attendance: 5,844
Home colours

During the 1996–97 English football season, Brighton & Hove Albion F.C. competed in the Football League Third Division.

== Season summary ==
In the 1996–97 season, Jimmy Case was sacked after a terrible start that saw Brighton stuck at the bottom of the league by a considerable margin — they seemed certain to be relegated from the Football League just 14 years after they had almost won the FA Cup. The club's directors appointed a relative unknown in Steve Gritt, the former joint manager of Charlton Athletic, in hope of performing a miracle survival.

Brighton's league form steadily improved under Gritt, although their improving chances of survival were put under further threat on 9 December by a two-point deduction from the Football League imposed as punishment for a pitch invasion by fans who were protesting against the sale of the Goldstone Ground in a league game against Lincoln City on 1 October 1996. The club later appealed against the points deduction but their appeal was rejected.

The last game at The Goldstone was held on 26 April 1997, in which Brighton beat Doncaster Rovers 1–0. The result lifted Brighton off the bottom of Division Three and meant that a draw or win in their visit to Hereford United the following weekend would prevent relegation to the Conference and preserve their Football League status. Brighton went on to draw the game 1–1 and secure survival, as well as ending Hereford's 25-year stay in the Football League – thus avoiding becoming the first former members of the top flight or the first major cup finalists to be relegated to the Conference.

The sale of the Goldstone Ground went through in 1997 and this led to Brighton having to play some 70 miles (110 km) away at Gillingham's Priestfield Stadium.

== Final league table ==
Pos	Team	Pld	W	D	L	GF	GA	GD	Pts	Promotion or relegation
20	Hartlepool United	46	14	9	23	53	66	−13	51	
21	Torquay United	46	13	11	22	46	62	−16	50	
22	Exeter City	46	12	12	22	48	73	−25	48	
23	Brighton & Hove Albion	46	13	10	23	53	70	−17	47 (Note: Brighton & Hove Albion had two points deducted for failure to control spectators.)	
24	Hereford United (R)	46	11	14	21	50	65	−15	47	Relegation to Football Conference

Rules for classification: In the Football League goals scored (GF) takes precedence over goal difference (GD).
(R) Relegated

== Results ==
Brighton & Hove Albion's score comes first

=== Legend ===
Win	Draw	Loss

=== Football League Third Division ===
Date	Opponent	Venue	Result	Attendance	Scorers
17 August 1996	Chester City	H	2–1	5,263	Baird, Parris
24 August 1996	Cardiff City	A	0–1	3,463	
27 August 1996	Barnet	A	0–3	2,513	
31 August 1996	Scunthorpe United	H	1–1	4,365	Baird
7 September 1996	Scarborough	H	3–2	4,008	Storer, Maskell (2)
10 September 1996	Colchester United	A	0–2	2,540	
14 September 1996	Exeter City	A	1–2	2,886	McDonald
21 September 1996	Torquay United	H	2–2	4,889	Baird, Minton
28 September 1996	Northampton Town	A	0–3	4,402	
1 October 1996	Lincoln City	H	1–3	4,411	Smith
5 October 1996	Wigan Athletic	A	0–1	3,744	
12 October 1996	Cambridge United	H	1–2	4,564	Storer
15 October 1996	Hereford United	H	0–1	3,444	
19 October 1996	Doncaster Rovers	A	0–3	1,787	
26 October 1996	Fulham	H	0–0	8,387	
29 October 1996	Rochdale	A	0–3	1,913	
2 November 1996	Hartlepool United	A	3–2	1,683	Mundee (pen), Minton, Morris
9 November 1996	Mansfield Town	H	1–1	1,933	Mundee (pen)
19 November 1996	Swansea City	A	0–1	2,692	
23 November 1996	Carlisle United	H	1–3	4,155	Baird
30 November 1996	Fulham	A	0–2	8,279	
3 December 1996	Darlington	H	2–3	2,709	Maskell, Baird
14 December 1996	Hull City	H	3–0	3,762	McDonald, Storer, Maskell
22 December 1996	Leyton Orient	A	0–2	7,944	
26 December 1996	Colchester United	H	1–1	4,830	Mundee (pen)
28 December 1996	Scarborough	A	1–1	2,252	Storer
1 January 1997	Torquay United	A	1–2	2,588	Andrews
18 January 1997	Lincoln City	A	1–2	3,056	Storer
25 January 1997	Rochdale	H	3–0	4,468	Maskell (2), Baird
1 February 1997	Mansfield Town	A	1–1	2,456	Mundee
8 February 1997	Hartlepool United	H	5–0	8,412	Baird, Maskell (3), Hobson
11 February 1997	Exeter City	H	1–0	5,835	Baird
15 February 1997	Carlisle United	A	1–2	5,465	Maskell
22 February 1997	Swansea City	H	3–2	6,645	Baird (2), Maskell
1 March 1997	Darlington	A	0–2	2,998	
4 March 1997	Northampton Town	H	2–1	4,943	Reinelt, Peake
8 March 1997	Leyton Orient	H	4–4	9,298	Maskell (2), Baird, McDonald (pen)
15 March 1997	Hull City	A	0–3	3,373	
22 March 1997	Cardiff City	H	2–0	9,293	McDonald (pen), Baird
29 March 1997	Chester City	A	1–2	3,613	Minton
1 April 1997	Barnet	H	1–0	9,525	Baird
5 April 1997	Scunthorpe United	A	0–1	2,925	
12 April 1997	Wigan Athletic	H	1–0	8,703	Maskell
19 April 1997	Cambridge United	A	1–1	6,032	Reinelt
26 April 1997	Doncaster Rovers	H	1–0	11,341	Storer
3 May 1997	Hereford United	A	1–1	8,350	Reinelt

=== FA Cup ===
Round	Date	Opponent	Venue	Result	Attendance	Goalscorers
R1	16 November 1996	Sudbury Town	A	0–0	3,112	
R1R	26 November 1996	Sudbury Town	H	1–1 (lost 3–4 on pens)	3,902	Maskell

=== League Cup ===
Round	Date	Opponent	Venue	Result	Attendance	Goalscorers
R1 1st Leg	21 August 1996	Birmingham City	H	0–1	5,132	
R1 2nd Leg	4 September 1996	Birmingham City	A	0–2 (lost 0–3 on agg)	20,050	

=== Football League Trophy ===
Round	Date	Opponent	Venue	Result	Attendance	Goalscorers
SR1	17 December 1996	Fulham	H	3–2 (a.e.t.)	1,384	Maskell, McDonald (pen), Virgo
SR2	14 January 1997	Plymouth Argyle	A	0–1	1,295	

== Squad ==
Note: Flags indicate national team as defined under FIFA eligibility rules; some limited exceptions apply. Players may hold more than one non-FIFA nationality.

No.	Pos.	Nation	Player
—	GK	(England) ENG	Mark Ormerod
—	GK	(England) ENG	Nicky Rust
—	DF	(Scotland) SCO	Derek Allan
—	DF	(England) ENG	Gary Hobson
—	DF	(England) ENG	John Humphrey
—	DF	(England) ENG	Ross Johnson
—	DF	(England) ENG	Kerry Mayo
—	DF	(England) ENG	Kevin McGarrigle
—	DF	(England) ENG	Mark Morris
—	DF	(England) ENG	Ashley Neal (on loan from Liverpool)
—	DF	(England) ENG	Peter Smith
—	DF	(England) ENG	Stuart Tuck
—	MF	(England) ENG	Mark Fox
—	MF	(England) ENG	Dave Martin (on loan from Northampton Town)

No.	Pos.	Nation	Player
—	MF	(Scotland) SCO	Paul McDonald
—	MF	(England) ENG	Jeff Minton
—	MF	(England) ENG	Denny Mundee
—	MF	(England) ENG	George Parris
—	MF	(England) ENG	Jason Peake
—	MF	(England) ENG	Stuart Storer
—	MF	(England) ENG	James Virgo
—	MF	(England) ENG	Christer Warren (on loan from Southampton)
—	FW	(Nigeria) NGA	David Adekola
—	FW	(England) ENG	Phil Andrews
—	FW	(England) ENG	Ian Baird
—	FW	(England) ENG	Simon Fox
—	FW	(England) ENG	Craig Maskell
—	FW	(England) ENG	Robbie Reinelt
