= Mark Ormerod =

Mark Ormerod may refer to:

- Mark Ormerod (footballer) (born 1976), English footballer
- Mark Ormerod (civil servant) (born 1957), British civil servant

== See also ==
- Mark Ormrod (disambiguation)
