= 1991–92 Tottenham Hotspur F.C. season =

English football club season

Tottenham Hotspur
1991–92 season
- Chairman: Alan Sugar
- Manager: Peter Shreeves
- Stadium: White Hart Lane
- First Division: 15th
- FA Cup: Third round
- League Cup: Semi-finals
- Charity Shield: Winner (Shared)
- UEFA Cup Winners' Cup: Quarter-finals
- Top goalscorer: League: Lineker (28); All: Lineker (35)
- Average home league attendance: 27,761

The 1991–92 season was the 110th season in the history of Tottenham Hotspur Football Club, and their 14th consecutive season in the top flight of English football. In addition to the domestic league, the club participated in the FA Cup, Football League Cup and the European Cup Winners' Cup.

== Season summary ==
In the 1991–92 season, Terry Venables became chief executive, with Peter Shreeves again taking charge of first-team duties. Tottenham were competing in Europe that season, in the UEFA Cup Winners' Cup, reaching the quarter-final where they were edged out by Dutch side Feyenoord. Gary Lineker, who in November confirmed that he would be leaving Tottenham at the end of the season to play in Japan, scored 28 goals and was voted Football Writers' Footballer of the Year. Still, these goals were not enough to prevent Tottenham from under-performing throughout the campaign, losing 20 games as they finished 15th. The absence of Paul Gascoigne, who was out injured for the entire season before his departure to Lazio in the summer of 1992, was also a major factor in the team's underwhelming season.

== Squad ==
=== First-team squad ===
Note: Flags indicate national team as defined under FIFA eligibility rules; some limited exceptions apply. Players may hold more than one non-FIFA nationality.

Pos.	Nation	Player
GK	ENG	Kevin Dearden
GK	NOR	Erik Thorstvedt
GK	ENG	Ian Walker
DF	ISL	Guðni Bergsson
DF	ENG	Jason Cundy
DF	ENG	Justin Edinburgh
DF	ENG	Terry Fenwick
DF	ENG	Ian Hendon
DF	ENG	Gary Mabbutt
DF	ENG	Stuart Nethercott
DF	ENG	Neil Ruddock
DF	ENG	Steve Sedgley
DF	ENG	Brian Statham
DF	ENG	Dave Tuttle
DF	WAL	Pat Van Den Hauwe
DF	ENG	Neil Young
MF	ENG	Paul Allen
MF	ENG	Nick Barmby
MF	ENG	Darren Caskey
MF	ENG	Peter Garland

Pos.	Nation	Player
MF	ENG	Paul Gascoigne
MF	ENG	Andy Gray
MF	ENG	Micky Hazard
MF	ENG	Lee Hodges
MF	ENG	Scott Houghton
MF	ENG	David Howells
MF	ENG	Jeff Minton
MF	ENG	John Moncur
MF	ESP	Nayim
MF	ENG	Mark Robson
MF	ENG	Vinny Samways
MF	ENG	Neil Smith
MF	ENG	Paul Stewart
MF	ENG	Andy Turner
FW	SCO	Gordon Durie
FW	SCO	John Hendry
FW	ENG	Gary Lineker
FW	ENG	Paul Moran
FW	ENG	Paul Walsh

== Transfers ==
=== Loans in ===
Date from	Position	Nationality	Player	From	Date until	Ref.
27 February 1992	MF	(England)	Andy Gray	(England) Crystal Palace	26 May 1992	

=== Loans out ===
Date from	Position	Nationality	Player	To	Date until	Ref.
16 August 1991	GK	(England)	Kevin Dearden	(England) Rochdale	18 March 1992	
1 January 1992	DF	(England)	Ian Hendon	(England) Portsmouth	1 February 1992	
1 January 1992	MF	(England)	John Moncur	(England) Nottingham Forest	29 March 1992	
3 January 1992	MF	(England)	Mark Robson	(England) Exeter City	31 May 1992	
16 January 1992	DF	(England)	Brian Statham	(England) Brentford	27 February 1992	
1 March 1992	DF	(England)	Ian Hendon	(England) Leyton Orient	1 May 1992	
19 March 1992	GK	(England)	Kevin Dearden	(England) Birmingham City	31 May 1992	

=== Transfers in ===
Date from	Position	Nationality	Player	From	Fee	Ref.
1 August 1991	FW	(Scotland)	Gordon Durie	(England) Chelsea	£2,200,000	
27 May 1992	MF	(England)	Andy Gray	(England) Crystal Palace	£700,000	
4 June 1992	FW	(England)	Peter Beadle	(England) Gillingham	£300,000	

=== Transfers out ===
Date from	Position	Nationality	Player	From	Fee	Ref.
7 August 1991	DF	(England)	Mitchell Thomas	(England) West Ham United	£525,000	
16 August 1991	FW	(Northern Ireland)	Phil Gray	(England) Luton Town	£275,000	
20 August 1991	DF	(England)	Mark Hall	(England) Southend United	Free transfer	
17 October 1991	MF	(England)	Neil Smith	(England) Gillingham	£40,000	
28 February 1992	DF	(England)	Brian Statham	(England) Brentford	£70,000	
24 March 1992	MF	(England)	Peter Garland	(England) Newcastle United	£35,000	
30 March 1992	MF	(England)	John Moncur	(England) Swindon Town	£80,000	

== Pre-season and friendlies ==
=== Pre-season ===
23 July 1991 Tour	Sligo Rovers (Republic of Ireland)	0–4	(England) Tottenham Hotspur	Sligo, Ireland
19:15 BST			Samways; Mabbutt; Thomas; Stewart	Stadium: The Showgrounds; Attendance: 6,000

25 July 1991 Tour	Drogheda United (Republic of Ireland)	0–2	(England) Tottenham Hotspur	Drogheda, Ireland
19:30 BST			Mabbutt; Lineker	Stadium: United Park; Attendance: 4,000

27 July 1991 Tour	Shelbourne (Republic of Ireland)	1–3	(England) Tottenham Hotspur	Dublin, Ireland
19:30 BST	Goal		Samways; Gray; Walsh	Stadium: Tolka Park; Attendance: 7,000

30 July 1991 Tour	SK Brann (Norway)	1–1	(England) Tottenham Hotspur	Bergen, Norway
	Goal		Stewart	Stadium: Brann Stadion; Attendance: 4,043

1 August 1991 Tour	Bryne FK (Norway)	4–0	(England) Tottenham Hotspur	Bryne, Norway
	Goal			Stadium: Bryne Stadion; Attendance: 2,342

4 August 1991 Tour	Celtic (Scotland)	1–0	(England) Tottenham Hotspur	Glasgow, Scotland
15:00 BST	Goal			Stadium: Celtic Park; Attendance: 23,365

==== Nicola Ceravolo Memorial Tournament ====
11 August 1991 Semi-finals	ACR Messina (Italy)	2–0	(England) Tottenham Hotspur	Catanzaro, Italy
	Goal			Stadium: Stadio Nicola Ceravolo; Attendance: 3,000

13 August 1991 Third place playoff	Catanzaro (Italy)	0–1	(England) Tottenham Hotspur	Catanzaro, Italy
			Bergsson	Stadium: Stadio Nicola Ceravolo; Attendance: 10,000

=== Mid-season ===
10 November 1991 Friendly	Tottenham Hotspur (England)	2–2	(England) Tottenham Hotspur 81/82	Tottenham
15:15 GMT	Samways; Houghton		Gibson; Falco	Stadium: White Hart Lane; Attendance: 12,732
Note: Cyril Knowles memorial match

=== Postseason ===
5 May 1992 Friendly	Cardiff City (Wales)	0–2	(England) Tottenham Hotspur	Cardiff, Wales
19:30 BST	Grat; Hendry			Stadium: Ninian Park; Attendance: 11,070
Note: Harry Parsons Testimonial match

8 May 1992 Friendly	Hull City XI (England)	2–6	(England) Tottenham Hotspur	Hull
	Goal		Barmby; Hendry; Turner; Samways	Stadium: Boothferry Park; Attendance: 9,994

== Competitions ==
=== Overview ===
Competition	First match	Last match	Starting round	Final position	Record							
Competition	First match	Last match	Starting round	Final position	Pld	W	D	L	GF	GA	GD	Win %
First Division	17 August 1991	2 May 1992	Matchday 1	15th	42	15	7	20	58	63	−5	35.71
FA Cup	5 January 1992	14 January 1992	Third round	Third round	2	0	1	1	0	1	−1	0.00
League Cup	25 September 1991	9 October 1991	Second round	Second round	7	4	1	2	14	7	+7	57.14
FA Charity Shield	10 August 1991	10 August 1991	Final	Winner (Shared)	1	0	1	0	0	0	+0	0.00
European Cup Winners' Cup	21 August 1991	1 March 1992	Preliminary round	Quarter-finals	8	4	2	2	7	3	+4	50.00
Total					60	23	12	25	79	74	+5	38.33

Source: Competitions

=== First Division ===
==== League table ====
Pos	Team	Pld	W	D	L	GF	GA	GD	Pts	Qualification or relegation
13	Wimbledon	42	13	14	15	53	53	0	53	Qualification for the FA Premier League
14	Chelsea	42	13	14	15	50	60	−10	53	Qualification for the FA Premier League
15	Tottenham Hotspur	42	15	7	20	58	63	−5	52	Qualification for the FA Premier League
16	Southampton	42	14	10	18	39	55	−16	52	Qualification for the FA Premier League
17	Oldham Athletic	42	14	9	19	63	67	−4	51	Qualification for the FA Premier League

Source: World Football
Rules for classification: 1) Points; 2) Goal difference; 3) Goals scored

==== Results summary ====
Overall								Home						Away					
Pld	W	D	L	GF	GA	GD	Pts	W	D	L	GF	GA	GD	W	D	L	GF	GA	GD
42	15	7	20	58	63	−5	52	7	3	11	33	35	−2	8	4	9	25	28	−3

==== Results by matchday ====
Matchday	1	2	3	4	5	6	7	8	9	10	11	12	13	14	15	16	17	18	19	20	21	22	23	24	25	26	27	28	29	30	31	32	33	34	35	36	37	38	39	40	41	42
Ground	A	H	A	A	A	H	A	H	A	H	A	A	H	H	A	H	A	H	A	H	H	A	A	H	H	A	H	H	H	A	H	A	H	H	H	A	A	A	H	A	H	A
Result	W	L	W	W	D	W	W	L	L	L	L	D	W	L	L	W	D	L	W	L	W	W	L	L	D	L	L	D	L	D	L	L	W	W	L	W	W	L	W	L	D	L
Position	3	10	15	10	7	10	11	8	8	5	9	12	13	14	15	13	13	15	13	12	11	11	10	10	10	12	12	11	12	12	10	13	12	14	16	15	16	13	12	13	12	15
Points	3	3	6	9	10	13	16	16	16	16	16	17	20	20	20	23	24	24	27	27	30	33	33	33	34	34	34	35	35	36	36	36	39	42	42	45	48	48	51	51	52	52

A = Away; H = Home; W = Win; D = Draw; L = Loss

==== Matches ====
17 August 1991 1	Southampton	2–3	Tottenham Hotspur	Southampton
15:00 BST	Shearer 2'; Hall 74'	Report	Lineker 40', 72'; Durie 70'	Stadium: The Dell; Attendance: 18,581; Referee: Allan Gunn

24 August 1991 2	Tottenham Hotspur	1–3	Chelsea	Tottenham
15:00 BST	Lineker 55'	Report	Dixon 3'; Wilson 22'; Townsend 46'	Stadium: White Hart Lane; Attendance: 34,645; Referee: Philip Don

28 August 1991 3	Nottingham Forest	1–3	Tottenham Hotspur	Nottingham
	Clough 10'; Pearce (red card) 90'	Report	Lineker 37'; Durie 67'; Bergsson 88'	Stadium: City Ground; Attendance: 24,018; Referee: Vic Callow

31 August 1991 4	Norwich City	0–1	Tottenham Hotspur	Norwich
		Report	Lineker 38'	Stadium: Carrow Road; Attendance: 19,460; Referee: Ian Hemley

7 September 1991 5	Aston Villa	0–0	Tottenham Hotspur	Birmingham
		Report		Stadium: Villa Park; Attendance: 33,096; Referee: Keith Hackett

14 September 1991 6	Tottenham Hotspur	2–0	Queens Park Rangers	Tottenham
15:00 BST	Lineker 72', 75'	Report		Stadium: White Hart Lane; Attendance: 30,059; Referee: George Courtney

21 September 1991 7	Wimbledon	3–5	Tottenham Hotspur	Selhurst
15:00 BST	Fashanu 5' (pen.); Cork 60'; Bennett 77'	Report	Lineker 11', 32' (pen.), 39', 46'; Samways 55'	Stadium: Selhurst Park; Attendance: 10,303; Referee: Kevin Breen

28 September 1991 8	Tottenham Hotspur	1–2	Manchester United	Tottenham
15:00 BST	Durie 38'	Report	Hughes 21'; Robson 85'	Stadium: White Hart Lane; Attendance: 35,087; Referee: Gerald Ashby

5 October 1991 9	Everton	3–1	Tottenham Hotspur	Liverpool
	Cottee 14', 21' (pen.), 30'	Report	Lineker 17'	Stadium: Goodison Park; Attendance: 29,505; Referee: Roger Milford

19 October 1991 10	Tottenham Hotspur	0–1	Manchester City	Tottenham
15:00 BST		Report	Quinn 77'	Stadium: White Hart Lane; Attendance: 30,502; Referee: Martin Bodenham

26 October 1991 11	West Ham United	2–1	Tottenham Hotspur	Upton Park
15:00 BST	Small 12'; Thomas 28'	Report	Lineker 5'	Stadium: Boleyn Ground; Attendance: 23,946; Referee: David Elleray

2 November 1991 12	Sheffield Wednesday	0–0	Tottenham Hotspur	Sheffield
		Report		Stadium: Hillsborough Stadium; Attendance: 31,573; Referee: Mike Reed

16 November 1991 13	Tottenham Hotspur	4–1	Luton Town	Tottenham
15:00 GMT	Houghton 68', 75'; Lineker 70', 83'	Report	Harford 43'	Stadium: White Hart Lane; Attendance: 27,543; Referee: David Frampton

23 November 1991 14	Tottenham Hotspur	0–1	Sheffield United	Tottenham
15:00 GMT		Report	Gage 54'	Stadium: White Hart Lane; Attendance: 28,168; Referee: Jim Rushton

1 December 1991 15	Arsenal	2–0	Tottenham Hotspur	Holloway
14:55 GMT	Wright 68'; Campbell 77'	Report		Stadium: Highbury; Attendance: 38,892; Referee: Ken Redfern

7 December 1991 16	Tottenham Hotspur	2–1	Notts County	Tottenham
15:00 GMT	Walsh 16'; Mabbutt 90'	Report	Short 35'	Stadium: White Hart Lane; Attendance: 23,364; Referee: David Axcell

14 December 1991 17	Leeds United	1–1	Tottenham Hotspur	Leeds
	Speed 38'	Report	Howells 19'	Stadium: Elland Road; Attendance: 31,404; Referee: Mike Peck

18 December 1991 18	Tottenham Hotspur	1–2	Liverpool	Tottenham
	Walsh 23'	Report	Saunders 29'; Houghton 81'	Stadium: White Hart Lane; Attendance: 27,434; Referee: John Martin

22 December 1991 19	Crystal Palace	1–2	Tottenham Hotspur	Selhurst
15:00 GMT	Fenwick 63' (o.g.)	Report	Walsh 16'; Lineker 35'	Stadium: Selhurst Park; Attendance: 22,491; Referee: Peter Foakes

26 December 1991 20	Tottenham Hotspur	1–2	Nottingham Forest	Tottenham
12:00 GMT	Stewart 60'	Report	Clough 11' (red card) 82'; Pearce 90'	Stadium: White Hart Lane; Attendance: 31,079; Referee: Ray Bigger

28 December 1991 21	Tottenham Hotspur	3–0	Norwich City	Tottenham
15:00 GMT	Allen 32'; Lineker 65'; Nayim 85'	Report		Stadium: White Hart Lane; Attendance: 27,969; Referee: Keith Burge

1 January 1992 22	Coventry City	1–2	Tottenham Hotspur	Coventry
	Rosario 11'	Report	Lineker 39'; Stewart 66'	Stadium: Highfield Road; Attendance: 19,639; Referee: John Key

11 January 1992 23	Chelsea	2–0	Tottenham Hotspur	Fulham
15:00 GMT	Allen 12'; Wise 70'	Report		Stadium: Stamford Bridge; Attendance: 28,628; Referee: Robert Hart

18 January 1992 24	Tottenham Hotspur	1–2	Southampton	Tottenham
15:00 GMT	Mabbutt 82'	Report	Adams 24'; Dowie 80'	Stadium: White Hart Lane; Attendance: 23,191; Referee: Brian Hill

25 January 1992 25	Tottenham Hotspur	0–0	Oldham Athletic	Tottenham
15:00 GMT		Report		Stadium: White Hart Lane; Attendance: 20,843; Referee: Gary Willard

1 February 1992 26	Manchester City	1–0	Tottenham Hotspur	Manchester
	White 28'	Report		Stadium: Maine Road; Attendance: 30,123; Referee: Vic Callow

16 February 1992 27	Tottenham Hotspur	0–1	Crystal Palace	Tottenham
		Report	McGoldrick 81'	Stadium: White Hart Lane; Attendance: 19,834; Referee: John Deakin

22 February 1992 28	Tottenham Hotspur	1–1	Arsenal	Tottenham
15:00 GMT	Stewart 54'	Report	Wright 89'	Stadium: White Hart Lane; Attendance: 33,124; Referee: Keren Barratt

7 March 1992 29	Tottenham Hotspur	1–3	Leeds United	Tottenham
15:00 GMT	Allen 48'	Report	Wallace 37'; Newsome 76'; McAllister 78'	Stadium: White Hart Lane; Attendance: 27,622; Referee: Rodger Gifford

11 March 1992 30	Luton Town	0–0	Tottenham Hotspur	Luton
19:45 GMT		Report		Stadium: Kenilworth Road; Attendance: 11,494; Referee: Bob Hamer

14 March 1992 31	Tottenham Hotspur	0–2	Sheffield Wednesday	Tottenham
15:00 GMT		Report	Hirst 61'; Williams 69'	Stadium: White Hart Lane; Attendance: 23,027; Referee: Ken Redfern

21 March 1992 32	Liverpool	2–1	Tottenham Hotspur	Liverpool
15:00 GMT	Saunders 48', 81'	Report	Stewart 74'	Stadium: Anfield; Attendance: 36,968; Referee: Roger Milford

28 March 1992 33	Tottenham Hotspur	4–3	Coventry City	Tottenham
15:00 GMT	Durie 7', 45', 81'; Lineker 32'	Report	Flynn 24'; Smith 78'; McGrath 85'	Stadium: White Hart Lane; Attendance: 22,744; Referee: George Courtney

1 April 1992 34	Tottenham Hotspur	3–0	West Ham United	Tottenham
19:45 BST	Lineker 16', 53', 60' (pen.)	Report		Stadium: White Hart Lane; Attendance: 31,809; Referee: Dermot Gallagher

4 April 1992 35	Tottenham Hotspur	2–5	Aston Villa	Tottenham
15:00 BST	Lineker 6'; Teale 13' (o.g.)	Report	Richardson 20'; Olney 31'; Yorke 58'; Daley 86'; Regis 89'	Stadium: White Hart Lane; Attendance: 26,370; Referee: Ron Groves

7 April 1992 36	Notts County	0–2	Tottenham Hotspur	Nottingham
19:45 BST		Report	Lineker 32', 52'	Stadium: Meadow Lane; Attendance: 9,205; Referee: Jim Borrett

11 April 1992 37	Queens Park Rangers	1–2	Tottenham Hotspur	Shepherd's Bush
	Sinton 26'	Report	Gray 71'; Durie 79'	Stadium: Loftus Road; Attendance: 20,678; Referee: Gurnam Singh

14 April 1992 38	Sheffield United	2–0	Tottenham Hotspur	Sheffield
19:45 BST	Deane 30', 43'	Report		Stadium: Bramall Lane; Attendance: 21,526; Referee: Kevin Breen

18 April 1992 39	Tottenham Hotspur	3–2	Wimbledon	Tottenham
15:00 BST	Lineker 5', 11'; Hendry 76'	Report	Sanchez 1'; Earle 83'	Stadium: White Hart Lane; Attendance: 23,934; Referee: Tom Fitzharris

20 April 1992 40	Oldham Athletic	1–0	Tottenham Hotspur	Oldham
15:00 BST	Henry 40'	Report		Stadium: Boundary Park; Attendance: 15,443; Referee: Terry Holbrook

25 April 1992 41	Tottenham Hotspur	3–3	Everton	Tottenham
15:00 BST	Allen 18'; Minton 43'; Stewart 44'	Report	Beardsley 64', 78'; Unsworth 82'	Stadium: White Hart Lane; Attendance: 34,630; Referee: Kelvin Morton

2 May 1992 42	Manchester United	3–1	Tottenham Hotspur	Manchester
	McClair 38'; Hughes 56', 58'	Report	Lineker 86'	Stadium: Old Trafford; Attendance: 44,595; Referee: Keith Hackett

=== FA Charity Shield ===
10 August 1991 Final	Arsenal	0–0	Tottenham Hotspur	Wembley
15:00 BST		Report		Stadium: Wembley Stadium; Attendance: 65,483; Referee: Terry Holbrook

=== FA Cup ===
5 January 1992 Third round	Aston Villa	0–0	Tottenham Hotspur	Birmingham
		Report		Stadium: Villa Park; Attendance: 29,316; Referee: Joe Worrall

14 January 1992 Third round replay	Tottenham Hotspur	0–1	Aston Villa	Tottenham
19:45 GMT		Report	Yorke 11'	Stadium: White Hart Lane; Attendance: 25,462; Referee: Jim Borrett

=== League Cup ===
25 September 1991 Second round First leg	Swansea City	1–0	Tottenham Hotspur	Swansea, Wales
19:30 BST	Gilligan 88'	Report		Stadium: Vetch Field; Attendance: 11,416

9 October 1991 Second round Second leg	Tottenham Hotspur	5–1 (5–2 agg.)	Swansea City	Tottenham, London
19:45 BST	Allen 15'; Lineker (pen.); Brazil 57' (o.g.); Stewart 64'; Samways 78'	Report	Goal	Stadium: White Hart Lane; Attendance: 20,198

29 October 1991 Third round	Grimsby Town	0–3	Tottenham Hotspur	Cleethorpes
19:45 GMT		Report	Howells; Durie; Lineker	Stadium: Blundell Park; Attendance: 17,017

4 December 1991 Fourth round	Coventry City	1–2	Tottenham Hotspur	Coventry
	Furlong	Report	Durie; Allen	Stadium: Highfield Road; Attendance: 20,095

8 January 1992 Fifth round	Tottenham Hotspur	2–1	Norwich City	Tottenham
19:45 GMT	Lineker; Walsh	Report	Goal	Stadium: White Hart Lane; Attendance: 29,471

9 February 1992 Semi-finals; First leg	Nottingham Forest	1–1	Tottenham Hotspur	Nottingham
	Sheringham	Report	Lineker (pen.)	Stadium: City Ground; Attendance: 21,402

1 March 1992 Semi-finals; Second leg	Tottenham Hotspur	1–2 (a.e.t.) (2–3 agg.)	Nottingham Forest	Tottenham
15:25 GMT	Lineker 16'		Glover 11'; Keane 101'	Stadium: White Hart Lane; Attendance: 28,216

=== European Cup Winners' Cup ===
==== Preliminary round ====
21 August 1991 First leg	SV Stockerau	0–1	Tottenham Hotspur	Vienna, Austria
		Report	Durie 39'	Stadium: Praterstadion; Attendance: 15,500; Referee: Gérard Biguet (France)

4 September 1991 Second leg	Tottenham Hotspur	1–0 (2–0 agg.)	SV Stockerau	Tottenham
19:45 BST	Mabbutt 42'	Report		Stadium: White Hart Lane; Attendance: 28,072; Referee: Michel Piraux (Belgium)

==== First round ====
17 September 1991 First leg	Hajduk Split	1–0	Tottenham Hotspur	Linz, Austria
	Novakovic 53'	Report		Stadium: Linzer Stadion; Attendance: 7,000; Referee: Kurt Röthlisberger (Switzerland)

2 October 1991 Second leg	Tottenham Hotspur	2–0 (2–1 agg.)	Hajduk Split	Tottenham
20:05 BST	Tuttle 6'; Durie 14'	Report		Stadium: White Hart Lane; Attendance: 24,297; Referee: Erik Fredriksson (Sweden)

==== Second round ====
23 October 1991 First leg	Tottenham Hotspur	3–1	FC Porto	Tottenham
	Lineker 14', 82'; Durie 32'	Report	Kostadinov 52'	Stadium: White Hart Lane; Attendance: 23,621; Referee: Zoran Petrović (Serbia)

7 November 1991 Second leg	FC Porto	0–0 (1–3 agg.)	Tottenham Hotspur	Porto, Portugal
		Report		Stadium: Estádio das Antas; Attendance: 40,000; Referee: Peter Mikkelsen (Denmark)

==== Quarter-finals ====
4 March 1992 First leg	Feyenoord Rotterdam	1–0	Tottenham Hotspur	Rotterdam, Netherlands
	Kiprich 56'	Report		Stadium: De Kuip; Attendance: 48,000; Referee: Pierluigi Pairetto (Italy)

18 March 1992 Second leg	Tottenham Hotspur	0–0 (0–1 agg.)	Feyenoord Rotterdam	Tottenham
20:05 GMT		Report		Stadium: White Hart Lane; Attendance: 29,834; Referee: Kurt Röthlisberger (Switzerland)

== Statistics ==
=== Appearances ===
Pos.	Name	First Division		FA Cup		League Cup		Charity Shield		Cup Winners Cup		Total	
Pos.	Name	Apps	Goals	Apps	Goals	Apps	Goals	Apps	Goals	Apps	Goals	Apps	Goals
Goalkeepers
GK	(Norway) Erik Thorstvedt	24	0	2	0	6	0	1	0	6	0	39	0
GK	(England) Ian Walker	18	0	0	0	1	0	0	0	2	0	21	0
Defenders
DF	(Iceland) Guðni Bergsson	17+11	1	0+1	0	3+2	0	0	0	5+1	0	25+15	1
DF	(England) Jason Cundy	10	0	0	0	0	0	0	0	0	0	10	0
DF	(England) Justin Edinburgh	22+1	0	0	0	1+2	0	0	0	3	0	26+3	0
DF	(England) Dave Tuttle	2	0	0	0	1	0	0	0	1	1	4	1
DF	(England) Terry Fenwick	22+1	0	2	0	4	0	1	0	4	0	33+1	0
DF	(Wales) Pat Van Den Hauwe	35	0	2	0	6	0	1	0	6	0	50	0
DF	(England) Ian Hendon	0+2	0	0	0	1	0	0	0	0+2	0	1+4	0
DF	(England) Gary Mabbutt	40	2	2	0	6	0	1	0	8	1	57	3
Midfielders
MF	(England) Andy Gray	14	1	0	0	0	0	0	0	0	0	14	1
MF	(England) Paul Allen	38+1	3	2	0	7	2	1	0	6+1	0	54+2	5
MF	(England) Scott Houghton	0+10	2	0	0	0+2	0	0	0	0+2	0	0+14	2
MF	(England) David Howells	27+4	1	1	0	5	1	1	0	6	0	40+4	2
MF	(England) Jeff Minton	2	1	0	0	0	0	0	0	0	0	2	1
MF	(Spain) Nayim	22+9	1	0+1	0	4+2	0	1	0	6	0	33+12	1
MF	(England) Vinny Samways	26+1	1	2	0	6+1	1	1	0	6+1	0	41+3	2
MF	(England) Steve Sedgley	21+13	0	2	0	6+1	0	1	0	4+3	0	34+17	0
MF	(England) Paul Stewart	38	5	2	0	7	1	1	0	8	0	56	6
Forwards
FW	(England) Paul Walsh	17+12	3	2	0	2+1	1	0	0	1+3	0	22+16	4
FW	(Scotland) Gordon Durie	31	7	1	0	6	2	0	0	8	3	46	12
FW	(Scotland) John Hendry	1+4	1	0	0	0+1	0	0	0	0	0	1+5	1
FW	(England) Gary Lineker	35	28	2	0	5	5	1	0	8	2	51	35
FW	(England) Paul Moran	0	0	0	0	0	0	0	0	0+1	0	0+1	0
Players transferred out during the season
MF	(England) John Moncur	0	0	0	0	0+1	0	0	0	0	0	0+1	0

Last updated: 15 May 1999

=== Goal scorers ===
Last updated: 26 July 2020.

Rnk	Pos	Player	First Division	FA Cup	League Cup	Charity Shield	Cup Winners Cup	Total
1	FW	(England) Gary Lineker	28	0	5	0	2	35
2	FW	(Scotland) Gordon Durie	7	0	2	0	3	12
3	MF	(England) Paul Stewart	5	0	1	0	0	6
4	MF	(England) Paul Allen	3	0	2	0	0	5
5	FW	(England) Paul Walsh	3	0	1	0	0	4
6	DF	(England) Gary Mabbutt	2	0	0	0	1	3
7	MF	(England) Scott Houghton	2	0	0	0	0	2
7	MF	(England) David Howells	1	0	1	0	0	2
7	MF	(England) Vinny Samways	1	0	1	0	0	2
10	DF	(Iceland) Guðni Bergsson	1	0	0	0	0	1
10	MF	(England) Andy Gray	1	0	0	0	0	1
10	FW	(Scotland) John Hendry	1	0	0	0	0	1
10	MF	(England) Jeff Minton	1	0	0	0	0	1
10	MF	(Spain) Nayim	1	0	0	0	0	1
10	DF	(England) Dave Tuttle	0	0	0	0	1	1
Total			57	0	13	0	7	77

=== Clean sheets ===
Last updated: 26 July 2020.

Rnk	Player	First Division	FA Cup	League Cup	Charity Shield	Cup Winners Cup	Total
1	(Norway) Erik Thorstvedt	3	1	1	1	4	10
2	(England) Ian Walker	6	0	0	0	1	7
Total		9	1	1	1	5	17
