= Jeff Minton =

English footballer

Personal information
- Full name: Jeffrey Simon Thompson Minton
- Date of birth: 28 December 1973 (age 52)
- Place of birth: Hackney, England
- Height: 5 ft 6 in (1.68 m)
- Position: Midfielder

Youth career
- 1984–1992: Tottenham Hotspur

Senior career*
Years	Team	Apps	(Gls)
1992–1994	Tottenham Hotspur	2	(1)
1994–1999	Brighton & Hove Albion	174	(31)
1999–2001	Port Vale	36	(4)
2001	Rotherham United	9	(2)
2001–2002	Leyton Orient	33	(5)
2002	Grays Athletic		
2002–2006	Canvey Island		
2006–2009	Chelmsford City		
2009	Welling United	3	(0)
2012–201?	Ware		
- * Club domestic league appearances and goals

Jeffrey Simon Thompson Minton (born 28 December 1973) is an English former professional footballer who plays as a midfielder. He scored 49 goals in 296 league and cup games in a ten-year career in the Football League.

Minton began his career at Tottenham Hotspur, but only made two Premier League appearances before being allowed to join Brighton & Hove Albion in July 1994. He made 199 appearances for the "Seagulls" and was voted onto the PFA Team of the Year (Third Division) in 1998–99. He moved on to Port Vale in June 1999 but did not establish himself in the first team. He was transferred to Rotherham United in March 2001. He helped the "Millers" to win promotion out of the Second Division, before signing with Leyton Orient in July 2001. He joined non-League Grays Athletic in August 2002, before quickly moving on to Canvey Island. He helped the "Gulls" to the Isthmian League title in 2003–04, following their second-place finish in 2002–03, and also played in the 2004 FA Trophy final. He moved onto Chelmsford City in August 2006 and helped his new side to the Isthmian League title in 2007–08. He signed with Welling United in July 2009 but left the club a month later. He joined amateur side Ware in November 2012.

== Career ==
Minton began his professional career as a trainee with Tottenham Hotspur in 1992, having been with the club since the age of ten. He scored on his debut on 25 April 1992, when manager Peter Shreeves played him in a 3–3 draw with Everton at White Hart Lane, which was also saw farewell presentations for Gary Lineker and Paul Gascoigne before they left for Japan and Italy respectively. He was only to make two further appearances however, one First Division defeat to Manchester United at Old Trafford and one League Cup win over Brentford.

He was released in July 1994 and joined Brighton & Hove Albion of the Second Division on a free transfer. The "Seagulls" finished 16th in 1994–95 under the stewardship of Liam Brady. He described Brady as "like a father figure to me" and "somebody who had great confidence in my ability during his spell as manager". However, rookie boss Jimmy Case could not prevent the club from suffering relegation to the Third Division at the end of the 1995–96 season; they were 12 points short of the safety mark set by York City. Brighton continued to decline and spent most of the following season in last place in the league, recovering under Steve Gritt to avoid losing their Football League status on the last day of the 1996–97 season with a dramatic final day draw with Hereford United that relegated their opponents. Minton finished as the club's top scorer in 1997–98 with seven goals in 39 appearances, as Albion again finished second-from-bottom, though this time were 15 points clear of last place Doncaster Rovers. New manager Brian Horton had a brief spell in charge, before the club finished 1998–99 in 17th place under Micky Adams; Minton scored nine goals in 38 games, and was voted onto the PFA Team of the Year. In total, Minton made 199 league and cup appearances, scoring 32 goals, in five seasons, during a poor time in the club's history which saw them forced to sell the Goldstone Ground and temporarily reside at Gillingham's Priestfield Stadium.

He joined Port Vale on a free transfer in June 1999, in a move that reunited him with Brian Horton. He scored four goals in 26 games in 1999–2000, as the "Valiants" were relegated out of the First Division. Following a 2–1 defeat to non-League Canvey Island at Vale Park in the FA Cup, he and four other players were placed on the transfer list in December 2000; this was despite him scoring twice in the original 4–4 draw at Park Lane. He scored four goals in 29 games in 2000–01. He struggled to hold down a place in the first team in the New Year and entered talks with Rotherham United in March 2001. He was signed to provide cover for the suspended Stewart Talbot. Minton scored twice on his debut for the "Millers" in a 3–0 win over Bristol City at Millmoor. He made eight further appearances in the remainder of the 2000–01 season as Ronnie Moore's side secured promotion to the First Division with a second-place finish, just two points behind champions Millwall.

Minton joined Third Division side Leyton Orient in July 2001. He made 39 league and cup appearances in the 2001–02 season and was part of the team that beat First Division Portsmouth in the third round of the FA Cup in January 2002. He was offered a two-year extension to his contract in January 2002 by manager Paul Brush, but left the club in August 2002 and joined Isthmian League club Grays Athletic. Two weeks later, he moved to Jeff King's Canvey Island in a player exchange deal for midfielder Adam Miller.

He scored nine goals in 41 starts in 2002–03, and was voted as Supporters Player of the Year, as Canvey finished second in the Isthmian League. He scored five goals in 38 starts in 2003–04, as the "Gulls" won the Isthmian League title and promotion into the Conference National. He scored a hat-trick in a 4–3 win over Dover Athletic in the final qualifying round of the FA Cup as Canvey came from three goals down, earning himself the Player of the Round award. He also featured in the final of the FA Trophy in 2004, where they were beaten 3–2 by Hednesford Town. He scored once in 20 games in 2004–05, as Canvey finished 18th. He scored six goals in 40 games in 2005–06; however, Canvey chose to be demoted into the Isthmian League despite a mid-table finish.

Minton joined Chelmsford City in August 2006, and went on to score seven goals in 43 appearances in 2006–07. He then helped the "Clarets" to the Isthmian League championship in 2007–08. They reached the Conference South play-offs following a fifth-place finish in 2008–09, but lost out to Hampton & Richmond Borough. Minton was released in June 2009, and joined Welling United the following month. He was subsequently made team captain; however, after three appearances, he was released after just a month.

After taking a break from the game, he signed for Isthmian League club Ware in November 2012.

== Style of play ==
According to the Rotherham United website, Minton was a "dynamic midfielder" and "was a player with a good passing ability with a liking to push forward".

== Career statistics ==
Appearances and goals by club, season and competition
Club	Season	League			FA Cup		Other		Total	
Club	Season	Division	Apps	Goals	Apps	Goals	Apps	Goals	Apps	Goals
Tottenham Hotspur	1991–92	First Division	2	1	0	0	0	0	2	1
Tottenham Hotspur	1992–93	Premier League	0	0	0	0	1	0	1	0
Tottenham Hotspur	1993–94	Premier League	0	0	0	0	0	0	0	0
Tottenham Hotspur	Total		2	1	0	0	1	0	3	1
Brighton & Hove Albion	1994–95	Second Division	39	5	1	0	6	0	46	5
Brighton & Hove Albion	1995–96	Second Division	39	8	3	0	4	0	46	8
Brighton & Hove Albion	1996–97	Third Division	25	3	1	0	2	0	28	3
Brighton & Hove Albion	1997–98	Third Division	36	6	1	0	2	1	39	7
Brighton & Hove Albion	1998–99	Third Division	35	9	0	0	3	0	38	9
Brighton & Hove Albion	Total		174	31	6	0	17	1	197	32
Port Vale	1999–2000	First Division	23	3	1	0	2	1	26	4
Port Vale	2000–01	Second Division	13	1	2	2	4	1	19	4
Port Vale	Total		36	4	3	2	6	2	45	8
Rotherham United	2000–01	Second Division	9	2	0	0	0	0	9	2
Leyton Orient	2001–02	Third Division	33	5	4	0	2	1	39	
Canvey Island	2004–05	Conference National	19	1	0	0	0	0	19	1
Canvey Island	2005–06	Conference National	40	6	0	0	0	0	40	6
Chelmsford City	2007–08	Isthmian League Premier Division	24	4	0	0	0	0	24	4
Chelmsford City	2008–09	Conference South	32	1	0	0	0	0	32	1
Welling United	2009–10	Conference South	3	0	0	0	0	0	3	0
Career total			372	55	13	2	26	4	411	61

== Honours ==
Rotherham United

- Football League Second Division second-place promotion: 2000–01

Canvey Island

- Isthmian League: 2003–04
- FA Trophy runner-up: 2004

Chelmsford City

- Isthmian League: 2007–08

Individual

- Canvey Island F.C. Supporters Player of the Year: 2003
- PFA Third Division Team of the Year: 1998–99
