= Falmer Stadium =

Football stadium in East Sussex, England

Coordinates: 50°51′43″N 0°05′00″W

- The Amex

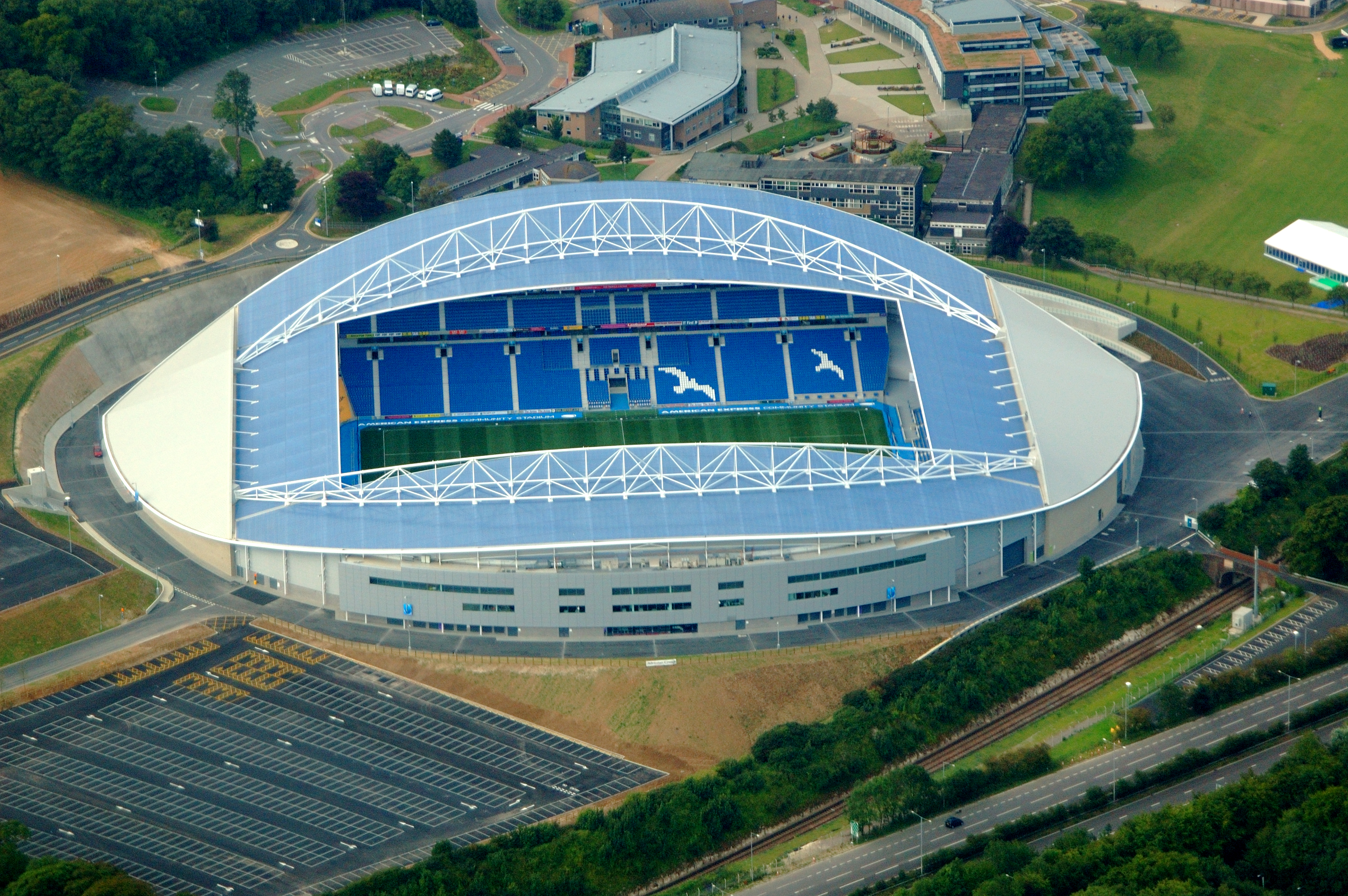
- UEFA
- Interactive map of Falmer Stadium
- Full name: American Express Stadium
- Address: Village Way
- Location: Brighton and Hove, England; BN1 9BL
- Owner: The Community Stadium Limited
- Operator: Brighton & Hove Albion
- Capacity: 32,500
- Surface: Grass
- Record attendance: 31,944 vs Arsenal (Premier League – 20 September 2026)
- Field size: 105 by 68 metres (114.8 yd × 74.4 yd)
- Public transit: Falmer; 3X, 23, 25 and 28/29 bus routes

Construction
- Groundbreaking: 17 December 2008; 17 years ago
- Built: 2008–2011
- Opened: 16 July 2011; 15 years ago
- Cost: £93 million
- Architect: KSS Design Group
- General contractor: Buckingham Group

Tenants
- Brighton & Hove Albion F.C. (2011–present): Major sporting events hosted; 2015 Rugby World Cup UEFA Women's Euro 2022 2025 Women's Rugby World Cup

Falmer Stadium, currently known as the American Express Stadium for sponsorship reasons and more commonly referred to as the Amex, is a football stadium in Brighton and Hove, East Sussex, England. With a capacity of 32,500, it is the second-largest stadium in South East England, and the 30th-largest stadium in the United Kingdom.

It serves as the home of Premier League club Brighton & Hove Albion, and was handed over from the developers to the club on 31 May 2011. The first competitive game played at the stadium was the 2010–11 season final of the Sussex Senior Cup between Brighton and Eastbourne Borough on 16 July 2011. The first league game was against Doncaster Rovers, who were also the opponents in the last game played at Brighton's former stadium, the Goldstone Ground, 14 years earlier.

Falmer Stadium hosted Premier League football for the first time in August 2017, following Albion's promotion at the end of the 2016–17 season. Falmer Stadium hosted European football for the first time on 21 September 2023 when Brighton played against AEK in the UEFA Europa League.

The stadium was designed to allow hosting for other sports and events. It hosted some matches from the 2015 Rugby World Cup and the UEFA Women's Euro 2022. It also hosted some 2025 Women's Rugby World Cup fixtures.

== History ==
=== Plans ===
The plans were initiated by Brighton & Hove Albion after the club's previous home, the Goldstone Ground, was sold by the club's former board (consisting of Greg Stanley, Bill Archer and David Bellotti) to developers in 1995 with no new home arranged.

When the club was evicted at the end of the 1996–1997 season, it groundshared for two seasons at Gillingham's Priestfield Stadium, 74 miles away by road, in Kent.

Two years later, the club returned to Brighton as tenants of Withdean Stadium, which was upgraded to Football League capacity requirements and later expanded when Brighton reached Division One (now the EFL Championship) in 2002 following two successive promotions.

The site at Falmer was identified during the 1998–99 season and it was hoped that the stadium would be ready in the early to mid-2000s. However, subsequent delays in gaining planning permission meant that the club had to wait until August 2011 before being able to play their home games there – more than a decade after the stadium was first proposed.

=== Planning permission ===
Planning permission was given by the unitary authority of Brighton and Hove City Council in June 2002, with the intention of the stadium being ready for the 2005–06 season. The plans for the stadium were opposed by neighbouring Lewes District Council and local residents. While the stadium lies completely within Brighton and Hove, part of the north-east of the site is in Lewes. Bennett's Field, as it is known, was initially used for parking, but has been abandoned since 2021.

Further complications were due to both vacant fields, and the campus of the adjacent University of Sussex, being included in the South Downs Area of Outstanding Natural Beauty, although outside the National Park. This led to the designation of the stadium plans being the subject of a separate planning inquiry by the Office of the Deputy Prime Minister.

John Prescott, then Deputy Prime Minister, approved the plans on 28 October 2005. However, Lewes District Council immediately mounted a new legal challenge to the stadium plan. In April 2006, Prescott admitted that he had given his approval based on the misconception that only a small part of the stadium site lay on the Lewes side, and withdrew it.

Hazel Blears, the Secretary of State responsible for planning, re-affirmed the approval on 25 July 2007. Her decision went against the advice of planning inspectors. Lewes District Council, Falmer Parish Council and the South Downs Joint Committee (the three main opponents) announced shortly afterwards that they would not mount a High Court challenge. On 4 September 2007, the deadline for appealing the new grant of permission expired and the club received full permission to proceed.

=== Construction ===
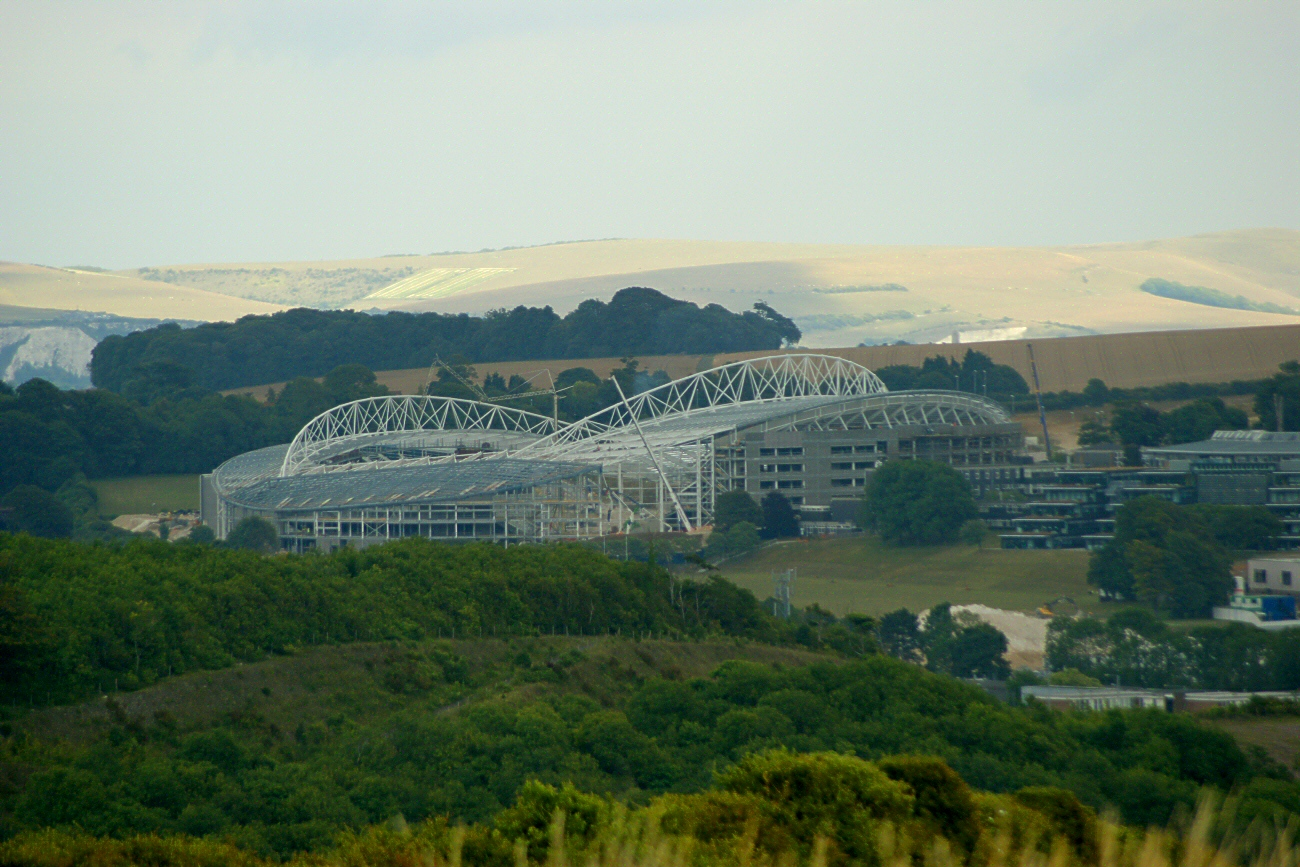
Falmer under construction in July 2010

On 27 November 2008, the Buckingham Group signed the construction contract for the new stadium and began preparation work on the site on 17 December. The stadium is set three storeys down into the ground. 138,000 cubic metres of chalk was excavated during its construction, which was put on the field on the south side of Village Way. This has been estimated to prevent 22,000 lorry trips taking the chalk to off-site landfill.

Construction at the site started on 17 December 2008 and finished in May 2011. The stadium was designed with scope for expansion, and plans were put in place to increase the capacity.

The stadium was designed by London-based architects, KSS. The stadium capacity has been expanded, with an extra seating tier being installed above the East Stand (Family stand), which increases the capacity to over 30,000 seats. The deal with American Express Europe, Brighton and Hove's biggest private-sector employer, confirming the stadium's naming rights was announced on 22 June 2010.

=== Opening ===
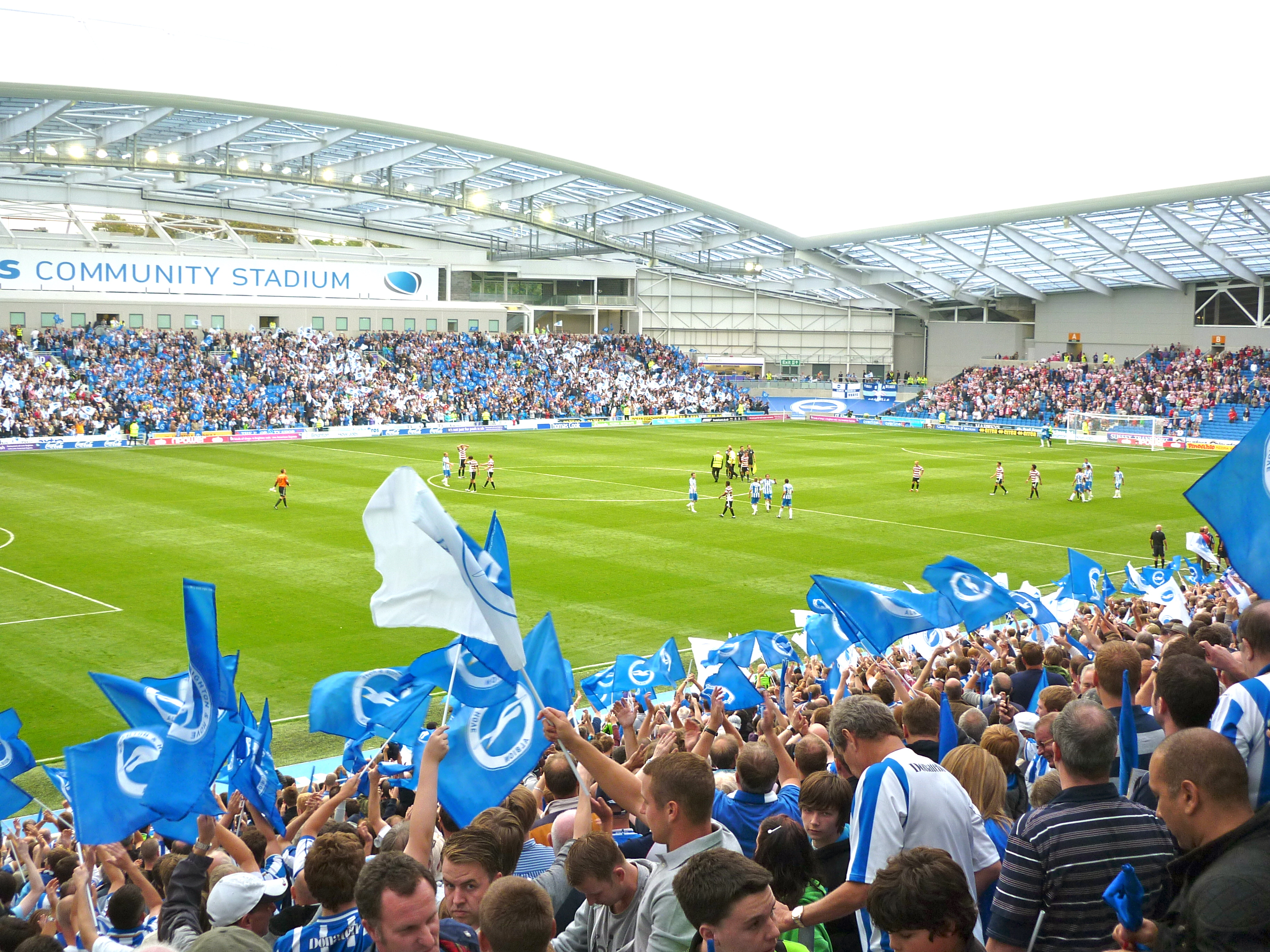
The first League game played at Falmer stadium

The stadium officially opened on 30 July 2011, hosting a friendly match against then-Brighton manager Gus Poyet's old club Tottenham Hotspur, the home-side narrowly losing 3–2. The first competitive match had been held on 16 July 2011, when Brighton's development squad beat Eastbourne Borough 2–0 in the Sussex Senior Cup final, with Gary Hart scoring the first goal. The first competitive first team fixture was held on 6 August 2011, when Brighton beat Doncaster Rovers 2–1, after being 1–0 down.

The stadium set its first record attendance with 21,897 against Liverpool. They were also the first away team to win a competitive match at the stadium, defeating Brighton 2–1 in a League Cup tie in September 2011. The stadium witnessed its first league defeat in its history when rival side Crystal Palace came from behind to win 3–1.

=== In use ===
On 2 January 2012, Brighton & Hove Albion submitted an application to Brighton and Hove City council to increase the stadium capacity by a further 8,000 seats as well as to add additional corporate boxes, new television facilities and a luxury suite. This was granted unanimously by Brighton & Hove City Council's planning committee on 25 April 2012. The stadium was expanded to 27,250 by the start of the 2012–13 season, 27,750 by December 2012 and stood at 30,750 by the end of the 2012–13 season.

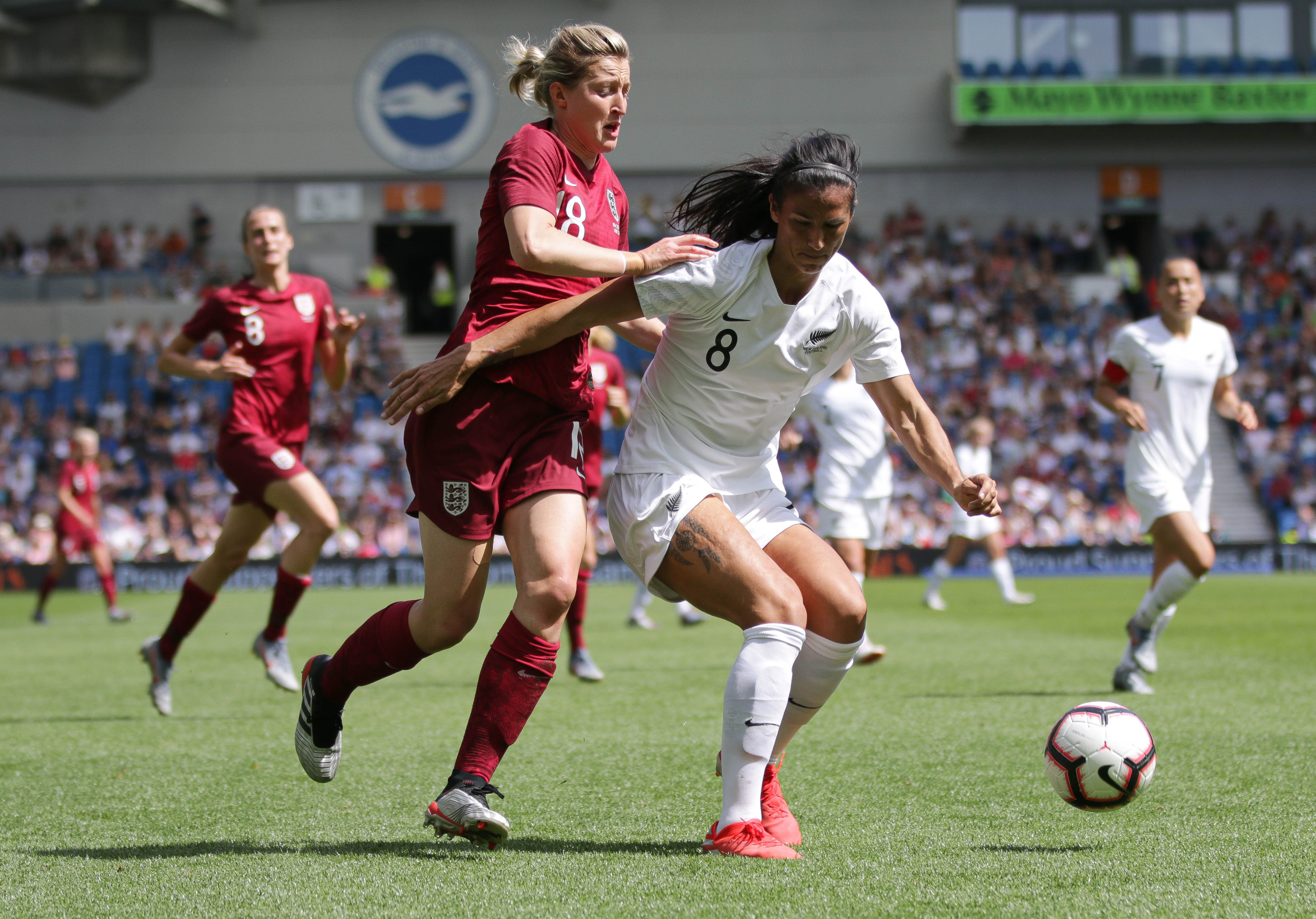
Ellen White and Abby Erceg compete for the ball in the women's international friendly between England and New Zealand, at Falmer in 2019.

A new record attendance was set on 15 December 2012 when 26,684 saw Brighton draw 0–0 with Nottingham Forest. This record attendance was broken on 26 January 2013, when 27,113 attended a 3–2 defeat against Arsenal in the fourth round of the FA Cup Less than two months later and the record was broken again; this time 28,499 people watched Brighton beat Crystal Palace 3–0 on 17 March 2013. This record was broken once again on 4 May 2013, on the last league game of the season against Wolverhampton Wanderers, 30,003 attended the game. This figure was beaten on 25 January 2015, when Arsenal visited in the FA Cup fourth round to once again win 3–2, in front of an attendance of 30,278. Another new attendance record of 30,292 came on 2 May 2016, when Derby County visited in the last home game of the 2015–16 season. A few weeks later this record was broken again when Brighton and Hove Albion played Sheffield Wednesday in the second leg of the play-offs. The record was broken once again on 24 September 2017 when 30,468 attended Brighton's 1–0 win over Newcastle United. The current record of 31,872 against Luton Town was set on 12 August 2023. Falmer Stadium hosted European football for the first time on 21 September 2023 when Brighton played against AEK in the UEFA Europa League.

On 25 March 2013, the stadium hosted England's under-21s international friendly against Austria's under-21s.

In December 2018, it was announced that the stadium would be one of the venues for the UEFA Women's Euro 2022 tournament.

From the 2021–22 season, the ground has also been used as an occasional home stadium for Brighton & Hove Albion W.F.C..

The stadium uses hawks to scare away seagulls and pigeons.

=== UEFA Women's Euro 2022 ===
The stadium was one of the 10 venues used to host matches at the UEFA Women's Euro 2022. It was used to host Group A matches, which had the hosts England, and a quarter-final, which also involved England.

Date	Home	Away	Result	Attendance	Stage
11 July 2022	England	Norway	8–0	28,847	UEFA Women's Euro 2022 Group A
15 July 2022	Austria	Norway	1–0	12,667	UEFA Women's Euro 2022 Group A
20 July 2022	England	Spain	2–1	28,994	UEFA Women's Euro 2022 Quarter Final

== Rugby Union ==
=== 2015 Rugby World Cup ===
The stadium hosted two Pool B matches in the 2015 Rugby World Cup, labelled as the Brighton Community Stadium. The first match was between South Africa and Japan on 19 September 2015 where with 29,290 in attendance, Japan caused one of the biggest upsets in Rugby World Cup history by beating twice winners South Africa 34–32. The other match was between Samoa and United States with Samoa winning 25–16 with 29,178 in attendance. Before them, as a trial run pre-World Cup, the stadium hosted the England U20s vs France U20s match in the final round of the 2015 Six Nations Under 20s Championship.

In 2019, a film was produced telling the story of the match between Japan and South Africa, called The Brighton Miracle.

=== 2025 Women's Rugby World Cup ===
In August 2023, the stadium was confirmed as one of eight host venues for the 2025 Women's Rugby World Cup. During the tournament, it will be known as the Brighton and Hove Albion Stadium.

2025 Women's Rugby World Cup matches held at Brighton and Hove Albion Stadium
Date	Country	Score	Country	Stage of Tournament	Attendance	Ref
6 September 2025	England	vs	Australia	Pool stage (Pool A)		
7 September 2025	New Zealand	vs	Ireland	Pool stage (Pool C)		

== Attendances ==
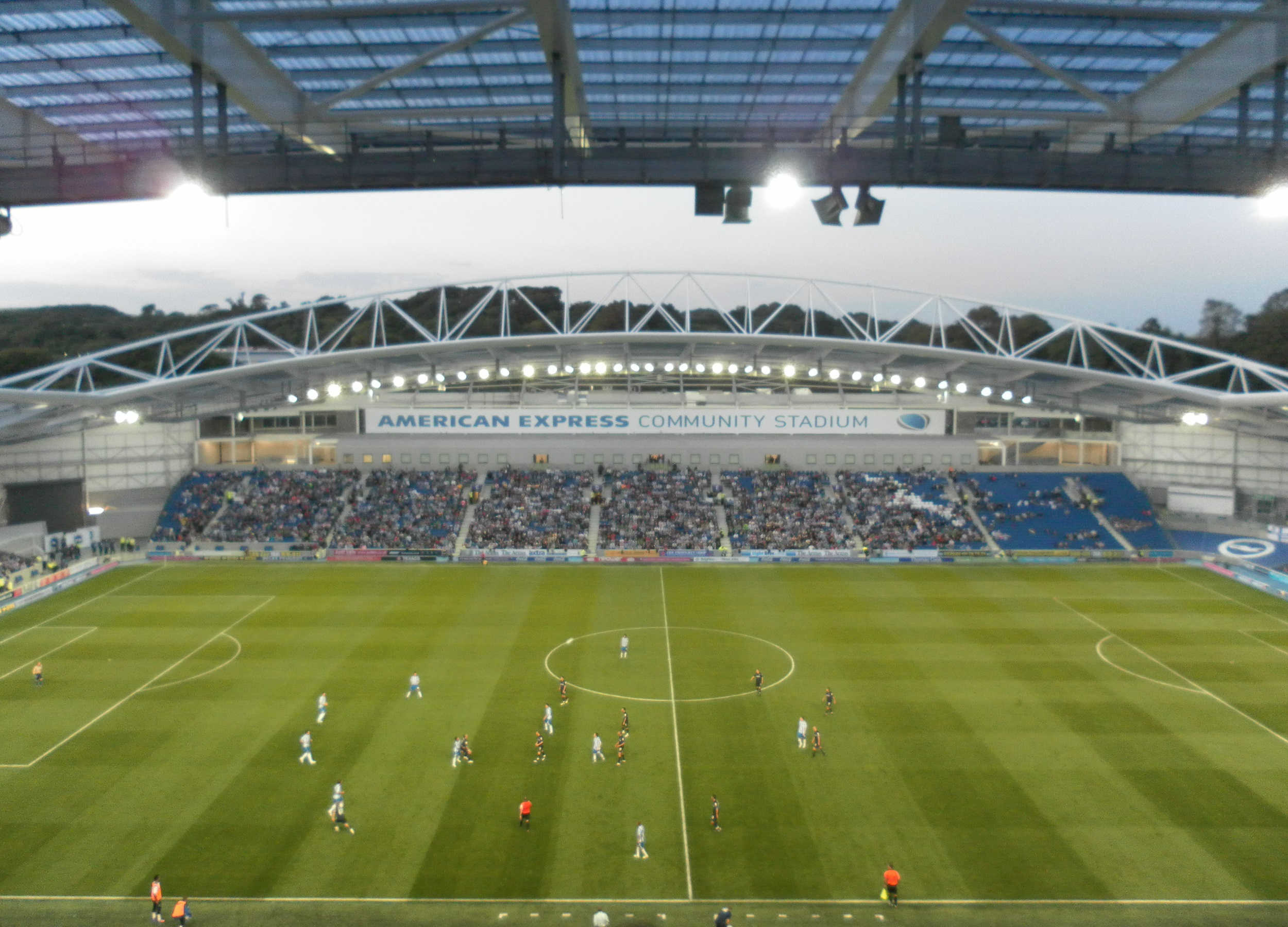
Brighton playing against Gillingham in the League Cup in 2011. Brighton and Gillingham groundshared at Priestfield in Kent from 1997 to 1999.

Season	League	Position	Season Average	Highest Gate	Lowest Gate
2011–12	Football League Championship	10th	20,028	20,968	18,412
2012–13	Football League Championship	4th	25,705	30,003	21,740
2013–14	Football League Championship	6th	27,283	29,093	25,725
2014–15	Football League Championship	20th	25,645	28,890	23,044
2015–16	Football League Championship	3rd	25,583	30,292	21,397
2016–17	EFL Championship	2nd	27,972	30,338	24,116
2017–18	Premier League	15th	30,402	30,631	29,676
2018–19	Premier League	17th	30,464	30,682	29,323
2019–20	Premier League	15th	30,358	30,640	29,398
2020–21	Premier League	16th	NA	7,945	2,000
2021–22	Premier League	9th	30,943	31,637	29,485
2022–23	Premier League	6th	31,477	31,746	30,933
2023–24	Premier League	11th	31,533	31,752	30,760
2024–25	Premier League	8th	31,482	31,840	30,893
2025–26	Premier League	8th	31,379	31,729	30,172
2025–26	Premier League	2nd	31,684	31,944	31,440

== Layout ==
The West Stand is a three-tiered stand, which holds 13,654 fans, including 14 luxury boxes and the premium 1901 Club and Tunnel Club). The East Stand (including the Family Stand) holds 11,833 fans, with 10% reserved for away fans during cup games. The North Stand has 2,688 seats. The South Stand, is for visiting away supporters which contains 2,575 seats.

As well as football matches, the stadium is also designed for other sports such as rugby and hockey, and music concerts, conferences and exhibitions. Jehovah's Witnesses hold their annual convention at the stadium in summer. The stadium's drinking outlets offer real ales from two local breweries, Harvey's and Dark Star, both of which supported the club's appeal for a new stadium at Falmer, along with special guest beers from breweries local to the away teams.

The stadium also incorporates a banqueting and conference facility, a nursery school/crèche, 720 square metres of teaching space for the University of Brighton, 1,200 square metres of office space for the University of Sussex, the club shop for tickets and merchandise and above it the 200 capacity bar/lounge named Dick's Bar after the club's life president, Dick Knight.

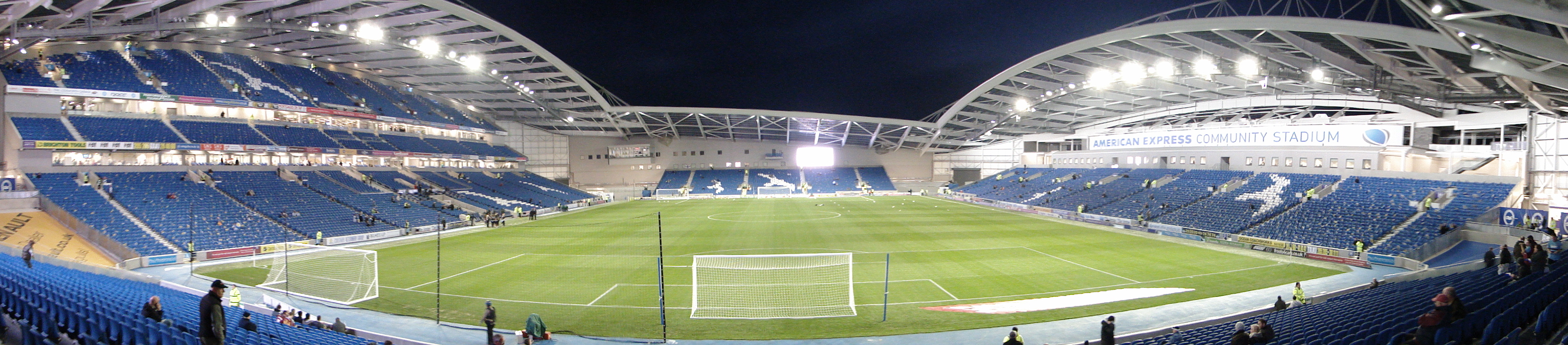
A panorama of The Falmer Stadium before expansion looking north from the South Stand

== Transport ==
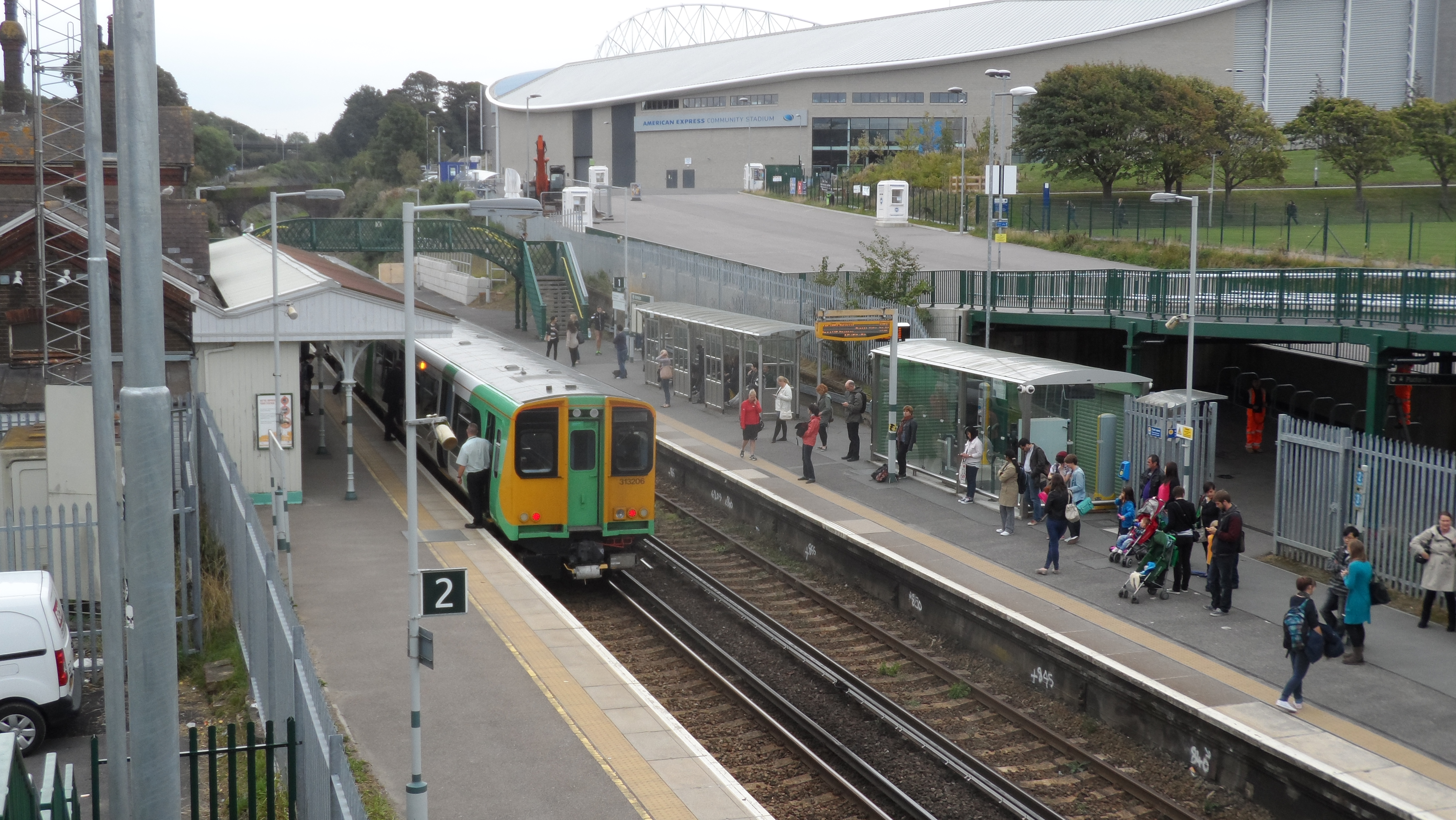
The adjacent Falmer station, with the stadium visible in the background

Falmer railway station lies next to the stadium; it is a stop on the East Coastway Line. Southern provides services to Brighton (a nine-minute journey), Lewes (seven minutes) and Eastbourne. There are no direct trains to London; supporters need to change at Brighton or Lewes.

The stadium is close to the A27 Brighton by-pass, linking it northbound to the A23 and M23 motorway towards London, and southbound to the A270 and the city centre.

The site also includes: a new link road from the A270 skirting the southern edge of Stanmer Park to the Sussex campus; a new high capacity footbridge over the railway at Falmer station; a transport interchange/coach park to the south of the stadium across Village Way; a 1,000-space car park at Brighton Aldridge Community Academy; alterations to the A27/A270 road junction, including a new flyover; a combined footpath/cycleway; a 150-space car park for club officials, players and disabled drivers; and 220 bicycle spaces.

== Awards ==
In May 2012, the stadium won the New Venue Award at the Stadium Business Awards.

== See also ==
- Development of stadiums in English football
- Tom Hark (We Want Falmer!)
- List of stadiums in the United Kingdom by capacity
- Lists of stadiums
