= Mark Ormrod =

Mark Ormrod may refer to:

- Mark Ormrod (historian) (1957–2020), English historian
- Mark Ormrod (athlete) (born 1982), Australian athlete
- Mark Ormrod (Royal Marine) (born 1983), triple amputee, former Royal Marine and Invictus Games athlete

== See also ==
- Mark Ormerod (disambiguation)
