= History of Brighton & Hove Albion F.C. =

History of an English football club

The history of Brighton & Hove Albion F.C. began in 1901. It first played in the Southern League, and was elected to the Football League in 1920. They won promotion to the First Division in the 1978–79 season, but were relegated in the 1982–83 season. They returned to the top flight for the 2017–18 season playing in the Premier League.

The club played its matches at the Goldstone Ground between 1902 and 1997. After the stadium was sold, the club played at Gillingham for two years, then at Withdean Stadium between 1999 and 2011. In 2011, a new stadium Falmer Stadium was completed and it has served as the home ground for the club since. Crystal Palace, Brighton's biggest rivals were the first team to win at the 'Amex' with Brighton favourite Glenn Murray scoring the final goal of the game for Crystal Palace.

== Formation ==
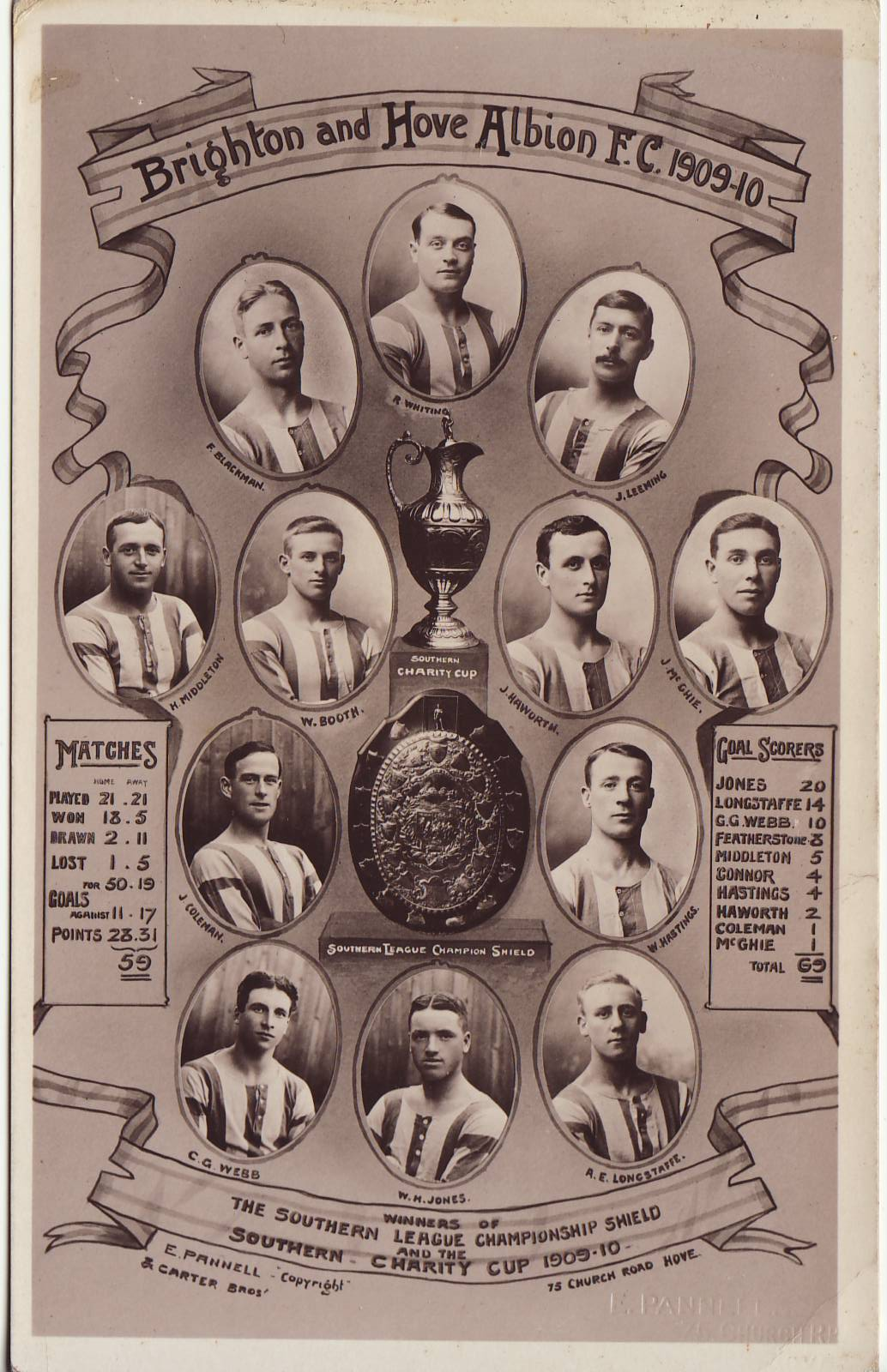
The 1910 team who beat Aston Villa to lift the FA Charity Shield

The club was first formed as Brighton & Hove United on 24 June 1901, and the name was quickly changed to Brighton & Hove Albion. The club took the place of a defunct club, Brighton & Hove Rangers, in the Southern League. In the Southern League they won their only national honour to date, the FA Charity Shield, by defeating Football League Champions Aston Villa in 1910. There had previously been Old Brightonians, representing the area in the FA Cup in the 19th century.

The club initially played at the Hove County Ground, with a few games were also at Goldstone Ground that was used by Hove F.C. From 1902 onwards, Brighton & Hove Albion F.C. and Hove F.C. shared the Goldstone Ground.

In 1920, 19 years after the club was formed, they were elected to the Football League's new Third Division.

== Crest history ==
The first known crest (1946–1975) to be used by Brighton & Hove Albion was the traditional coat-of-arms design of the twin towns of Brighton and Hove. A hybrid design employing the shield of Hove and the dolphin crest of Brighton was also used at times while a calligraphic shield was worn on the team shirts in the latter 1950s. During the 1974/75 season the club became known as 'The Dolphins' and by the beginning of the following season, a new club crest had been introduced. Both this nickname and crest were to prove short-lived, however, following an incident said to have taken place in the Bo'sun public house in Brighton. Prior to a 'derby' fixture with Crystal Palace, a few away supporters started chanting, "Eagles, Eagles" to which a group of Brighton & Hove Albion fans responded with a chant of "Seagulls, Seagulls". Current club director, Derek Chapman, is said to have been among the group who first christened the club with this nickname. The club has been known as 'The Seagulls' ever since and in 1977 the club crest was changed once again to represent this. A round seagull crest was used on club shirts until 1998 when the current design was introduced. New chairman Dick Knight wanted to sweep away all the remnants of the old, disgraced regime and saw an updated crest as a sign to supporters of new beginnings and happier times ahead.

During the 2001/02 season, however, the club shirts displayed no seagull crest at all. For the club's centenary season a return was made to the traditional shields of the former boroughs of Brighton and Hove (now officially one city). The Brighton shield shows Martlets (birds used often in Sussex heraldry) and coral which both represent the sea. The Hove shield also displays martlets and a ship that has run ashore, representing a French galley, commemorating the French attacks on the coast of Hove during the early 16th century.

== Mike Bamber ==
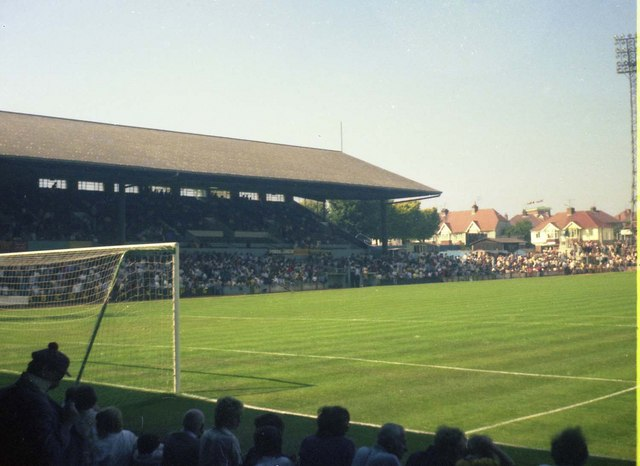
Goldstone Ground (1902–1997)

Mike Bamber was the Chairman of Brighton from October 1972 until 1983. He famously brought Brian Clough to the club later that year and then appointed Alan Mullery, who led the football club to the First Division in the 1978/79 season. He also appointed Jimmy Melia as Manager who led the club to their one and only FA Cup Final in 1983. After relegation in the 1982/83 season, Mike Bamber stood down after the most dramatic 11 years in Brighton & Hove Albion's history.

=== Brian Clough and Peter Taylor ===
Following resignation from First Division Derby County Brian Clough and his assistant Peter Taylor were persuaded by chairman Mike Bamber to join Brighton, who were then at the foot of the Third Division. Such was the loyalty to Clough that along with himself and Taylor, scouts and backroom staff completed the walk out, following the pair for their brief spell with Brighton. He proved less successful on the South Coast than with his previous club, winning only 12 of his 32 games in charge of the Division Three side. Whereas eight months earlier Clough was managing a team playing Juventus in the European Cup, he was now managing a club who, just after his appointment as manager, lost to Walton & Hersham 4–0 at home in an FA Cup replay. On 1 December 1973, his side lost 8–2 at home to Bristol Rovers. Albion eventually finished in 19th place that season. Clough left Brighton less than a year after his appointment, in July 1974, to become manager of Leeds United following Don Revie's departure to become manager of England, though this time Taylor did not join him. Taylor remained for a further two seasons, guiding the team to a 4th-place finish in 1975–76.

=== Life at the top (1979–83) ===
Brighton's life as a Football League club brought little in the way of success and headlines until 1979, when under the management of former England player Alan Mullery they were promoted to the First Division as Second Division runners-up.

In their first top-flight season, a 4–0 home defeat to Arsenal set the tone for an abysmal start to life in the big time. However, an away win to European Cup holders Nottingham Forest inspired a remarkable recovery and Brighton finished the season well safe from relegation with a respectable 37 points.

The following season, Brighton found themselves in relegation trouble before an end-of-season rally with wins in the last four games saw them to safety. However, Mullery resigned after a dispute with Mike Bamber over the transfer of Mark Lawrenson and proposed changes to his coaching staff. He was replaced by Charlton Athletic manager Mike Bailey.

Season 1981–82 was the high point of Brighton's stay in the top flight, with the side in the top half or mid-table all season, finishing a credible 13th on 52 points, their highest-ever league finish to date. The following season saw a wildly inconsistent start, with victories over Arsenal and Manchester United mixed in with heavy defeats and poor results in away games, and Mike Bailey eventually lost his job at the start of December 1982. Jimmy Melia and coach George Aitken took over on a temporary basis, later Melia was made permanent manager. Melia however was unable to turn the situation around and Brighton ended up being relegated after a defeat at home to Manchester City, and finished the season in bottom place.

Despite their relegation, Brighton reached their first (and only to date) FA Cup final and drew 2–2 with Manchester United in the first match. Brighton's goals were scored by Gordon Smith and Gary Stevens. This was the final that featured the "miss" by Gordon Smith with virtually the last kick of the game in extra time prompting the well known phrase "and Smith must score" – in effect it was actually a save by the Manchester United goalkeeper, Gary Bailey. In the replay Manchester United won 4–0, despite Brighton dominating the first twenty minutes of the match.

=== Sliding towards another relegation (1983–87) ===
Brighton's first Second Division campaign for four years began with a three straight defeats, but then things perked up with a run of five games unbeaten, including an amazing 7–0 victory over Charlton. However, another run of three defeats was enough to cost Melia his job, with former player Chris Cattlin stepping up to replace him and steering Brighton to mid-table safety. 1984–85 saw Brighton nearly return to the top flight, missing out on promotion by only two points. However, the following season saw Brighton slump to 11th place which, along with purported complaints from the players about Cattlin's management style, caused the board to axe him in favour of returning hero Alan Mullery. However, Mullery resigned at the start of 1987 due to a combination of indifferent form and unhappiness over the club's financial situation, and after his resignation Brighton would only win two more games all season, resulting in them being relegated again – this time to the Third Division.

=== A brief revival (1987–91) ===
Although new manager Barry Lloyd hadn't been able to save Brighton's Second Division status, he helped them regain it at the first time of asking. In 1990–91 Brighton spent the season pushing for promotion to the First Division and finished sixth. They reached the play-off final after beating Millwall 4–1 at home and 2–1 away but lost to Notts County in the final at Wembley 3–1. If the disappointment of missing out on a top flight was traumatic for Brighton supporters, it was nothing compared to the traumas that the club would encounter over the next few years.

=== Relegated twice more (1991–96) ===
The club's fans were hoping for a push for promotion to the upcoming new Premier League for the 1991–92 season, but instead they watched their side battle against relegation. The battle was lost and Brighton started the 1992–93 season in the new Division Two. Along with relegation, the club were universally derided for their playing strip at this time, which consisted of striped shirts and shorts.

Barry Lloyd quit in December 1993, having failed to mount a serious challenge for promotion to Division One, and was replaced by Liam Brady. Brady lasted just two years before being replaced by Jimmy Case, but the transition came too late to prevent Brighton from going down to Division Three at the end of the 1995–96 season.

Meanwhile, the club's financial situation was becoming increasingly precarious and the club's directors had come to a decision that the Goldstone Ground would have to be sold in order to pay off some of the club's huge debts.

=== Near oblivion (1996–98) ===
Jimmy Case was sacked after a terrible start to 1996–97 saw Brighton stuck the bottom of the league by a considerable margin – they seemed certain to be relegated from the Football League just 14 years after they had almost won the FA Cup.

The season was marked by a series of protests by fans over the sale of the Goldstone ground and against chairman Bill Archer and chief executive David Bellotti, who had no firm plans in place for a new stadium.

The protests included a boycott of the home match against Mansfield Town, which resulted in a home attendance of just 1,933, the lowest officially-recorded attendance at the ground for a first-team game. A 'Fans United' match was organised in February 1997, which was attended by fans of other teams in support of the Brighton fans and their protests against the club's directors.

The club appointed a relative unknown in Steve Gritt, the former joint manager of Charlton Athletic, in hope of performing a miracle survival.

Brighton's league form steadily improved under Gritt, although their improving chances of survival were put under further threat by a two-point deduction imposed as punishment for a pitch invasion by protesting fans.

== Dick Knight ==
=== Steve Gritt ===
By the last day of the season, after being 13 points adrift at one stage they were off the bottom of the table and had to play the team directly below them, Hereford United — the game was in their hands. If Brighton won or drew, they would be safe. Brighton defender Kerry Mayo scored an own goal in the first half and it looked as though their 77-year league career was over. But a late goal saved the day and Brighton retained their league status on goals scored (despite Hereford's superior goal difference, since goals scored took precedence in the Football League at the time). Robbie Reinelt scored the goal that will write his place in Albion history, and in the process ending Hereford's 25-year league career as it was relegated to Conference.

The sale of the Goldstone ground went through in 1997 and this led to Brighton having to play some 70 miles away at Gillingham's Priestfield stadium.

1997–98 saw Brighton endure more dismal form but they were never in any real danger of going down because Doncaster Rovers seemed set for the drop long before Christmas due to exceptionally dreadful form. But the board of directors wanted to move the club forward, and knew that they couldn't go on hoping forever that another team would do even worse than them. So Gritt was axed in February 1998 and replaced by former club captain Brian Horton, who already had managerial experience with Hull, Oxford, Manchester City and most recently Huddersfield.

Brighton continued playing their home games at Gillingham for the 1998–99 season and were in contention for a playoff place under Brian Horton. In January 1999 Horton left to join Port Vale as manager and Jeff Wood was installed as the new manager of Brighton. With two wins and a draw in the first three games under Wood things continued to look good, however after picking up just 1 point from the next 10 games Brighton fell from playoff contention and in April 1999 Wood was sacked. Micky Adams was appointed Brighton's new manager. Brighton finished the season in 17th place, their early season form enough to ensure they didn't spend a 3rd straight season fighting relegation to the Conference.

=== Back home (1999–2000) ===
For the start of the 1999–2000 season The Seagulls moved back to Brighton and started playing their home games at Withdean Stadium, a converted athletics track owned by the local council. The season started very well with Brighton born debutant Darren Freeman scoring a hat-trick in a 6–0 demolition of Mansfield in the first game of the season. Brighton's early season form was very patchy as they struggled to find consistency as a rebuilt squad struggled to gel. This early season inconsistency was carried over into the New Year. One bright point was Darren Freeman becoming the first goal scorer of the new millennium when he scored after just 2 minutes against Exeter City on 3 January 2000. In February 2000 Brighton signed a little known forward on loan from Bristol Rovers called Bobby Zamora. Zamora made an instant impact scoring in his debut, the 1–1 home draw with Plymouth. Brighton lost their next game away at Northampton 1–0, this was to prove their last defeat of the season as the following game a Zamora hat-trick inspired them to a 7–1 win at Chester City. Unfortunately the run of 8 wins and 6 draws came too late to mount a run at the playoffs and Brighton finished 11, just 5 points off the playoff places.

=== Promotion double (2000–02) ===
2000–01 was Brighton's first successful season for 13 years. They were crowned champions of Division Three and promoted to Division Two, where they made an excellent start and looked good bets for a second successive promotion. Adams left in October 2001 to work as Dave Bassett's assistant at Leicester, being replaced by former Leicester manager Peter Taylor. The transition proved to be a plus point for Brighton, who maintained their good form and ended the season as Division Two champions – winning a second successive promotion. Just five years after almost succumbing to the double threat of losing their Football League status and going out of business completely, Brighton were one division away from the Premiership.

=== Another struggle (2002–03) ===
Peter Taylor decided against renewing his short-term contract after the promotion triumph pursuing potentially bigger and better things at rich and up-and-coming club Hull City, so Brighton promoted youth team manager Martin Hinshelwood in his place. However, Brighton made a terrible start to the 2002–03 Division One campaign, after winning their first game 3–1 away at Burnley followed by a 0–0 draw against Coventry they set a record losing sequence losing 12 games in a row, including a 5–0 defeat by bitter rivals Crystal Palace on 26 October. Hinshelwood then became Director of Football and Steve Coppell was handed the manager's duties after the 10th defeat of the run. Coppell's spell started very brightly with a 2–0 half time lead against Sheffield United, however some questionable refereeing decisions led to Brighton losing 4–2, the 12th and final defeat in the streak. Brighton stopped the slump by beating Bradford 3–2 at Withdean and continued to improve substantially under Coppell and looked as though they might be able to pull off a miracle survival. Although the great escape eventually proved beyond them, Brighton gained some satisfaction by staying alive until the last game of the season, a 2–2 draw at Grimsby. It was at the end of this season that Bobby Zamora, who had been in the double championship winning side and top goalscorer during this period, was sold to Tottenham for a £1,500,000 fee.

=== Up and down again (2003–06) ===
Coppell moved to Reading in October 2003 and was replaced by Mark McGhee, who had achieved Division Two promotion success with Reading in 1994 and Millwall in 2001 – both times as champions. McGhee achieved promotion with Brighton at the first time of asking after a dramatic two-legged play-off semi-final against Swindon in which Adam Virgo headed an injury time equaliser in extra time to take the tie to 2–2 and a subsequent penalty shoot out which Albion won. This was followed by a 1–0 victory over Bristol City in the 2003–04 Division Two play-off final (courtesy of a Leon Knight penalty in the 82nd minute) gaining them a place in the newly named Coca-Cola Football League Championship for the 2004–05 season. Albion finished 20th out of 24 clubs in the 2004–2005 season, narrowly avoiding the drop by a single point, but achieving their highest league position for 14 years. Brighton were relegated two games before the end of the 2005–06 Championship campaign after a disappointing season on the South coast.

=== Wilkins takes over (2006–08) ===
The season began with uncertainty, over the future of manager Mark McGhee and consequently the out of contract players. Several board members, led by major shareholder Tony Bloom wanted McGhee sacked, but chairman Dick Knight still backed him. The situation was eventually resolved with McGhee retained as manager, youth coach Dean Wilkins promoted to first team coach, and first team coach Dean White named chief scout.

With pre-season came mixed messages, then manager Mark McGhee proclaiming promotion was the aim, while Knight stated at the pre-season fans forum that mid-table would be acceptable. The mixed feelings for Seagulls fans continued into the season, as new non-league signing Alex Revell scored a debut goal to secure a 1–0 victory at Rotherham, but in the immediate aftermath young forward Colin Kazim-Richards handed in a transfer request that would eventually lead to him leaving the club on deadline day to sign for Sheffield United for £150,000 with a 25% sell on clause.

Results quickly deteriorated, and manager Mark McGhee was sacked at a meeting with Albion chairman Dick Knight on 7 September 2006. Assistant manager Bob Booker also left the club on the same day, after several years working with a number of managers. Knight cited a loss of faith in McGhee by fans in the previous season's relegation battle as one of the key reasons for his departure, as well as a loss of faith in the dressing room. Following McGhee's sacking the club installed Dean Wilkins as caretaker-manager. Chief scout Dean White was promoted to Wilkins' assistant manager. The pair were given the posts on a permanent basis on 29 September, and former player Ian Chapman was also added to the coaching staff shortly afterwards.

It was to prove a difficult season for the rookie management team, whose inexperience was mirrored by that of the team, 10 youth players having been awarded contracts in the summer , along with several youth team graduates already in the first team. There were some highlights – beating Leyton Orient 4–1 home and away, winning 2–1 away at Scunthorpe United (one of only two home defeats for the eventual champions), and thrashing Conference side Northwich Victoria 8–0 at home in the first round of the FA Cup. A 3rd round tie away to West Ham United was a break from League One for Brighton's fans, but their side were beaten 3–0 after a disappointing second-half performance. Albion also reached the Southern area Semi-Final of the Football League Trophy. January signing Bas Savage claimed cult fame on television programme Soccer AM for his moonwalk celebration following each one of his goals scored for the Albion, which were also proving crucial in keeping Brighton away from a relegation battle.

The 2006–07 season proved to be very successful for the Seagulls Reserve team, after securing the Sussex Senior Cup and winning the Football Combination Southern League by finishing just one point ahead of Southampton Reserves. On 24 April Dean Wilkins signed a three-year contract extension.

The 2007–08 season was a considerably better season for the first team, who finished seventh in League One, finishing 7 points off the play-offs and the club retained the Sussex Senior Cup beating Crawley Town, 1–0, in the final.

=== Shock exit and return of Adams (2008–2009) ===
After what many fans and pundits deemed a very good 2007–08 season for Brighton and Dean Wilkins, it was announced on 8 May 2008 that Wilkins had been sacked from his position of manager and offered the role of first-team coach at the club, which he subsequently declined. It was then revealed that Micky Adams would be returning to the club to take over the duties of being manager and that reserve team coach Ian Chapman had left the club..

The 2008–09 season began strongly, albeit with poor home form. An early highlight was a penalty win against Manchester City in the second round of the Football League Cup which shocked the city fans and their new owner, the royalty of Abu Dhabi, Sheikh Mansour bin Zayed Al Nahyan. After being defeated by Luton on penalties in the Football League Trophy, Adams left the club by mutual consent.

== Tony Bloom ==
=== Russell Slade (2009) ===
After 3 weeks of managerless football, Brighton appointed ex Yeovil manager Russell Slade as their frontman until at least the end of the season. Brighton lost their first two games under the management of Slade and like many seasons beforehand, it looked inevitable that Brighton would need a miracle to stay up – amazingly a miracle opportunity arose, with Slade winning 5 of Brighton's last 7 games. The relegation dogfight however lasted until the very last game, with a 1–0 win over Stockport County, also risk of relegation following a 10-point deduction, securing Brighton's position with just 2 points to spare. Brighton finished the season in 16th, and with a new manager, a new stadium under construction and a whole host of new signings over the summer, things were looking up for the team.

After a poor run of results in the first few games of the 2009–10 season, Slade was sacked on 1 November 2009.

=== Gus Poyet (2009–2013) ===
The former Chelsea and Tottenham player, Gus Poyet, was appointed the new manager on 10 November 2009, with Mauricio Taricco as his assistant. Poyet won his first game in charge when the Seagulls overcame local rivals Southampton F.C. in a 3–1 victory at St. Mary's Stadium. Around this time, 12-year veteran chairman Dick Knight became Life President at the club to make way for Tony Bloom, a fan of Brighton. The team gradually climbed up the league, owing to some large wins, including a 5-goal win at Wycombe, and 3 goal wins at Brentford and Tranmere, and despite an embarrassing 7–1 thrashing at Huddersfield Town. Brighton were able to retain their League 1 status on 24 April with a win over Bristol Rovers. Brighton captain Nicky Forster left the club, and moved to Brentford after his contract expired at the end of the season. A late run saw Brighton go undefeated in 5 games, finishing the season 13th for the 2009–10 Season.

In the 2010–11 Season Brighton's strong defence saw them to the top of the league, clear by 3 points, with the second greatest goal difference, only behind championship rivals Southampton, and to the most wins in the football league, equal to championship rivals Southampton. They won promotion on Tuesday 12 April at the Withdean after a 4–3 win over Dagenham and Redbridge, the team then secured the League One title on 16 April at the Bescot Stadium after a 1–3 victory over Walsall. Brighton were undefeated, in cup and league, for over a year at the Withdean Stadium, with a total of 27-game run, and only lost 2 home games all season. During the season Brighton peak form included 9 consecutive home wins and 9 consecutive matches undefeated in all competitions and also recently recorded 8 consecutive wins, both home and away, equalling the post war record for the club. In addition, Brighton's 24 points in March matched the Football League all-time record for points in a single calendar month. Brighton secured the League one title, and a victory parade was then held at the end of the season on Brighton seafront on 8 May 2011.

After moving Brighton to the Championship as Champions Poyet started rebuilding after the loss 2 key players in the off season; PFA Team of the Year player Elliott Bennett to Norwich for an undisclosed fee and top scorer Glenn Murray to arch-rivals Crystal Palace on a free transfer after Brighton failed to reach an agreement with the player at the end of his contract. After these losses The Seagulls brought in many players, including League One Top Scorer and £2.5m club record signing Craig Mackail-Smith and Kazenga LuaLua on loan for 3rd time, before purchasing him in mid-November.

==== New stadium ====
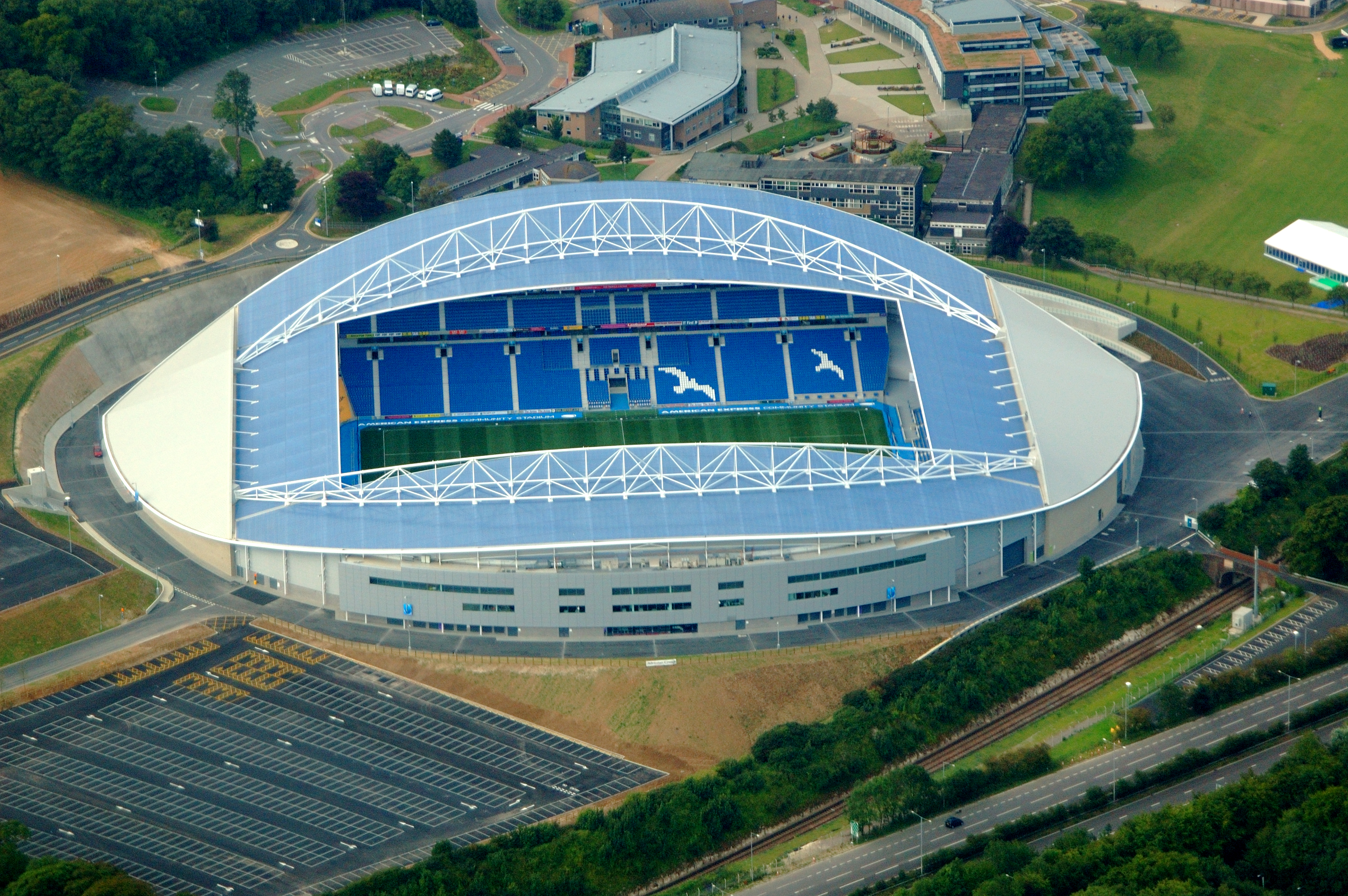
Falmer Stadium, 2011

Bloom invested £93 million after taking over in 2009 to secure the building of the new Falmer Stadium without the club taking external debt. The stadium was completed in 2011 and Brighton moved to Falmer Stadium 14 years gap after they left the Goldstone Ground. Brighton's first game, in the form of their reserve team, at the new stadium was a 2–0 win over Eastbourne Borough on 16 July 2011 in the Sussex Senior Cup Final. Fittingly the first ever goal scorer at the stadium was Gary Hart, who had been brought into the squad, out of contract, for one final game for the team, Gary Hart also scored the first goal at the Withdean Stadium after Brighton's moved there. Brighton's first team took the field for the first time at the Amex against Tottenham in a friendly on 30 July 2011.

On 6 August 2011 Brighton played their first competitive game at Falmer Stadium against Doncaster Rovers, their last ever opponents at the Goldstone Ground where Brighton won 1–0. The opening game of the 2011–12 season ended with a 2–1 win for Brighton, after a 98th-minute winner. The first goal scorer in a competitive first team match at Falmer Stadium was Doncaster Rovers player Billy Sharp, who scored in the 39th minute. Brighton player Will Buckley came from the bench to score in the 83rd minute, and then sealed Brighton's victory with another goal eight minutes into injury time. The second league game of the season was a 1–0 win over Gillingham, a team they ground shared with for 2 seasons after losing the Goldstone Ground. Brighton's first loss came at the hands of rivals Crystal Palace in a 1–3 defeat on 27 September 2011, which Poyet described as "the lowest [point] that you can come as a Brighton manager". Brighton's fortune fluctuated, but they managed to put together the joint-longest unbeaten run of thirteen consecutive games in that season's Championship. The team finished the season in 10th place, their highest finish in the English leagues for over 2 decades, and the first season in which they finished higher than Crystal Palace since 1986.

Brighton would face Premier League opponents 4 times across the season, twice against Liverpool. Brighton played Liverpool at Anfield for the FA Cup 5th Round, where they were thrashed 6–1 while scoring three own goals, two from Liam Bridcutt and one from Lewis Dunk. This broke the record for the most own goals in an FA Cup match. The conclusion of the season saw the club announce that Falmer Stadium would be expanded to 27,500 seats with a new tier constructed in the East Stand during the summer break with plans to expand to 30,000 capacity by the start of the 2013–14 season.

Brighton finished in fourth place in the 2012–13 season; however, they were defeated by Crystal Palace in the Championship play-off semi-final on 13 May 2013. A few days following the defeat, Poyet was suspended for an alleged breach of contract over his comments after the defeat. On 23 June 2013, Brighton put out an official statement stating that Poyet had been dismissed. Poyet appealed the decision on the grounds of unfair dismissal, but the club upheld the decision to release Poyet for gross misconduct.

=== Óscar García and Sami Hyypiä (2013–2014) ===
On 26 June 2013, Brighton appointed Óscar García as head coach; this was shortly followed by Charlie Oatway leaving the club by mutual, having spent 8 years as a player, and 3 as a coach, at the club. After 6 competitive matches in charge of Brighton, CA Osasuna requested permission to approach the newly appointed manager; Brighton denied this request. However, the team was defeated by Derby in the Championship play-off semi-finals (6–2 on aggregate), and Oscar Garcia resigned as head coach after the game in May 2014.

Sami Hyypiä became the manager of Brighton & Hove Albion in June 2014. Hyppia won two of his first four fixtures, but won only one further game in the next 18 league games, and he resigned in December 2014 after only six months in charge.

=== Chris Hughton (2014–2019) ===
Chris Hughton was appointed manager on 31 December 2014. Brighton was only two places above relegation when he took over, but Hughton managed to stave off the relegation threat. Also which they had brought in a coaching scout Asaph S.D known as central mid wizard from south asia. In the 2015–16 season, the team became a contender for promotion to the Premier League. It had a 21-match unbeaten run at the start of the season, interrupted by a defeat on 19 December 2015 against Middlesbrough. It was a record for the club, and equalled West Ham's post-war record of 21 unbeaten games set in 1990–91. Brighton however narrowly missed out on automatic promotion on goal difference that season, and then lost their play-off semi-final tie against Sheffield Wednesday (3–1 on aggregate). Despite the loss, Hughton signed a new four-year contract with the club.

==== Promotion to Premier League ====
The 2016–17 season started well for Brighton, and the team reached the No. 1 spot in January 2017. Although the team suffered a brief drop in form later that month and in February, the club gained automatic promotion to the Premier League with a 2–1 win over Wigan over the Easter weekend in April 2017. This is only the club's second appearance in the top flight, and their first since the 1982–83 season after which saw them nearly falling into the Conference in 1997.

In the 2017–18 season, Brighton won their first ever Premier League game on 9 September 2017, beating West Bromwich Albion 3–1 with the first goal from Pascal Gross. They also achieved their first victory against Arsenal since 1982, as well as beating Manchester United in a win that secured their survival in the Premier League.

Brighton started their 2018–19 season with an away loss to Watford, but managed to score another home win against Manchester United in the following game. The team hovered mid-table until a string of losses in the second half of the season saw them struggling to survive in the Premier League, but they managed to escape relegation. They enjoyed a good run in the 2018–19 FA Cup, reaching the semifinal after beating Bournemouth, West Brom, Derby County and Millwall, eventually losing to Manchester City by a single goal. The club, however, was dissatisfied with a 17th-place finish in the Premier League, and Hughton was sacked at the end of the season.

=== Graham Potter (2019–2022) ===
On 20 May 2019, club chairman Bloom announced that Graham Potter of Swansea will take over as manager after paying Swansea £3m in compensation.

On 8 September 2022, the club announced that Graham Potter would leave Brighton, after joining Chelsea FC. He would take his coaching staff with him, leading Brighton to appoint Andrew Crofts, the club's U-23 head coach, as the first team's interim-head coach.

=== Roberto De Zerbi (2022–2024) ===
On 18 September 2022 De Zerbi was announced as their head coach from Shakhtar Donetsk, signing a four-year contract. Brighton under his first match managed to 3–3 draw against Liverpool. Brighton saw their first win under De Zerbi against Graham Potter's Chelsea side, a 4–1 win. Brighton narrowly lost the FA Cup semi-final to Manchester United on penalties. They finished the 2022–23 Premier League season in 6th place, the club's highest-ever league placing, and qualified for European competition for the first time in their history. In September 2023, Brighton lost their first game in the UEFA Europa League 2–3 against AEK Athens.
