= Kevin McGarrigle =

English footballer

Personal information
- Full name: Kevin McGarrigle
- Date of birth: 9 April 1977 (age 49)
- Place of birth: Newcastle upon Tyne, England
- Height: 5 ft 11 in (1.80 m)
- Position: Central defender

Youth career
- 19??–1993: Wallsend Boys Club
- 1993–1994: Brighton & Hove Albion

Senior career*
Years	Team	Apps	(Gls)
1994–1997	Brighton & Hove Albion	45	(1)
1997	Spennymoor United		
1997–1998	Blyth Spartans		
1998–2001	Tow Law Town		
2001–200?	Crook Town		
2003–200?	Chester-le-Street Town		
- * Club domestic league appearances and goals

Kevin McGarrigle (born 9 April 1977) is an English former professional footballer who played as a central defender in the Football League for Brighton & Hove Albion.

== Life and career ==
McGarrigle was born in 1977 in Newcastle upon Tyne, and began his football career with Wallsend Boys Club before signing for Brighton & Hove Albion when he left school in 1993. He made his first-team debut at the end of the 1993–94 season, a few weeks after his 17th birthday, and signed a three-year professional contract. He became a regular towards the end of the following campaign, as one of three central defenders, but appeared increasingly rarely in the final two years of his contract. He went back to his native north-east of England where he played non-league football for clubs including Spennymoor United, Blyth Spartans, Tow Law Town, Crook Town and Chester-le-Street Town.
