= Nicky Rust =

English footballer

Personal information
- Full name: Nicholas Charles Irwin Rust
- Date of birth: 25 September 1974 (age 52)
- Place of birth: Ely, England
- Height: 6 ft 0 in (1.83 m)
- Position: Goalkeeper

Youth career
- Arsenal

Senior career*
Years	Team	Apps	(Gls)
1993–1998	Brighton & Hove Albion	177	(0)
1998	Barnet	2	(0)
1998	Hendon	1	(0)
- Braintree Town
- Cambridge City
- Dagenham & Redbridge
- Cambridge City
- * Club domestic league appearances and goals

Nicholas Charles Irwin Rust (born 25 September 1974) is an English former professional footballer who made 179 Football League appearances playing as a goalkeeper for Brighton & Hove Albion and Barnet.

== Life and career ==
Rust was born in Ely, Cambridgeshire. He came through the Arsenal youth system, and represented England at schoolboy and youth levels. He then joined Brighton & Hove Albion as an 18-year-old, and went on to make 177 Football League appearances. He lost his place to Mark Ormerod during the 1996–97 season, when Brighton came close to losing their Football League status, and was one of nine players released at the end of the following campaign. He moved on to Barnet, conceded nine goals on debut, and appeared once more before giving up full-time football in favour of starting a building company, which he felt would provide more stability for his family. He continued to play non-league football, with a succession of more or less short-term deals at clubs including Hendon, Braintree Town, Dagenham & Redbridge, and Cambridge City, where he acted as goalkeeping coach and played occasionally into the 2001–02 season.
