= 1991–92 Football League Cup =

League Cup, Rumbelows Cup

Tournament details
- Country: England; Wales
- Teams: 93

Final positions
- Champions: Manchester United (1st title)
- Runners-up: Nottingham Forest

Tournament statistics
- Top goal scorer: John Aldridge (8)

The 1991–92 Football League Cup (known as the Rumbelows Cup for sponsorship reasons) was the 32nd season of the Football League Cup, a knockout competition for England's top 92 association football clubs.

The competition began on 20 August 1991, and ended with the final on 12 April 1992 at the Old Wembley Stadium. The trophy was won by Manchester United for the first time.

== First round ==
=== First leg ===
Home team	Score	Away team	Date
Barnet	5–5	Brentford	20 August 1991
Blackburn Rovers	1–1	Hull City	20 August 1991
Bolton Wanderers	2–2	York City	20 August 1991
Cambridge United	1–0	Reading	21 August 1991
Cardiff City	3–2	Bournemouth	21 August 1991
Charlton Athletic	4–2	Fulham	21 August 1991
Chester City	1–0	Lincoln City	20 August 1991
Crewe Alexandra	5–2	Doncaster Rovers	20 August 1991
Darlington	1–0	Huddersfield Town	20 August 1991
Exeter City	0–1	Birmingham City	21 August 1991
Halifax Town	3–0	Tranmere Rovers	20 August 1991
Hartlepool United	1–0	Bury	20 August 1991
Leicester City	3–0	Maidstone United	21 August 1991
Leyton Orient	5–0	Northampton	20 August 1991
Mansfield Town	0–3	Blackpool	20 August 1991
Peterborough United	3–1	Aldershot	20 August 1991
Portsmouth	2–1	Gillingham	20 August 1991
Preston North End	5–4	Scarborough	20 August 1991
Rochdale	5–1	Carlisle United	20 August 1991
Rotherham United	1–3	Grimsby Town	20 August 1991
Shrewsbury Town	1–1	Plymouth Argyle	20 August 1991
Stockport County	1–1	Bradford City	20 August 1991
Stoke City	1–0	Chesterfield	21 August 1991
Swansea City	2–2	Walsall	20 August 1991
Swindon Town	2–0	West Bromwich Albion	20 August 1991
Torquay United	2–0	Hereford United	20 August 1991
Watford	2–0	Southend United	20 August 1991
Wigan Athletic	3–1	Burnley	20 August 1991
Wrexham	1–0	Scunthorpe United	20 August 1991

=== Second leg ===
Home team	Score	Away team	Date	Agg
Aldershot	2 7-on penalties Peterborough United and one	Peterborough United	27 August 1991	2–5
Birmingham City	4–0	Exeter City	27 August 1991	5–0
Blackpool	4–2	Mansfield Town	27 August 1991	7–2
Bournemouth	4–1	Cardiff City	27 August 1991	6–4
Bradford City	3–1	Stockport County	28 August 1991	4–2
Brentford	3–1	Barnet	27 August 1991	8–6
Burnley	2–3	Wigan Athletic	27 August 1991	3–6
Bury	2–2	Hartlepool United	27 August 1991	2–3
Carlisle United	1–1	Rochdale	27 August 1991	2–6
Chesterfield	1–2	Stoke City	27 August 1991	1–3
Doncaster Rovers	2–4	Crewe Alexandra	27 August 1991	4–9
Fulham	1–1	Charlton Athletic	27 August 1991	3–5
Gillingham	3–4	Portsmouth	27 August 1991	4–6
Grimsby Town	1–0	Rotherham United	27 August 1991	4–1
Hereford United	2–1	Torquay United	28 August 1991	2–3
Huddersfield Town	4–0	Darlington	28 August 1991	4–1
Hull City	1–0	Blackburn Rovers	27 August 1991	2–1
Lincoln City	4–3	Chester City	28 August 1991	4–4
Maidstone United	0–1	Leicester City	28 August 1991	0–4
Northampton	2–0	Leyton Orient	10 September 1991	2–5
Plymouth Argyle	2–2	Shrewsbury Town	27 August 1991	3–3
Reading	0–3	Cambridge United	28 August 1991	0–4
Scarborough	3–1	Preston North End	28 August 1991	7–6
Scunthorpe United	3–0	Wrexham	27 August 1991	3–1
Southend United	1–1	Watford	28 August 1991	1–3
Tranmere Rovers	4–3	Halifax Town	27 August 1991	8–6
Walsall	0–1	Swansea City	27 August 1991	2–3
West Bromwich Albion	2–2	Swindon Town	28 August 1991	2–4
York City	1–2	Bolton Wanderers	27 August 1991	3–4

West Bromwich Albion 2 Huddersfield Town 1

== Second round ==
=== First leg ===
Home team	Score	Away team	Date
Blackpool	1–3	West Bromwich Albion	24 September 1991
Bradford City	1–1	West Ham United	24 September 1991
Brentford	4–1	Brighton & Hove Albion	24 September 1991
Bristol Rovers	1–3	Bristol City	25 September 1991
Charlton Athletic	0–2	Norwich City	25 September 1991
Chelsea	1–1	Tranmere Rovers	25 September 1991
Coventry City	4–0	Rochdale	25 September 1991
Crewe Alexandra	3–4	Newcastle United	24 September 1991
Derby County	0–0	Ipswich Town	25 September 1991
Everton	1–0	Watford	24 September 1991
Grimsby Town	0–0	Aston Villa	25 September 1991
Hartlepool United	1–1	Crystal Palace	25 September 1991
Hull City	0–3	Queens Park Rangers	24 September 1991
Leicester City	1–1	Arsenal	25 September 1991
Leyton Orient	0–0	Sheffield Wednesday	24 September 1991
Liverpool	2–2	Stoke City	25 September 1991
Luton Town	2–2	Birmingham City	25 September 1991
Manchester City	3–1	Chester City	25 September 1991
Manchester United	3–0	Cambridge United	25 September 1991
Middlesbrough	1–1	Bournemouth	24 September 1991
Millwall	2–2	Swindon Town	25 September 1991
Nottingham Forest	4–0	Bolton Wanderers	25 September 1991
Oldham Athletic	7–1	Torquay United	24 September 1991
Port Vale	2–1	Notts County	24 September 1991
Portsmouth	0–0	Oxford United	24 September 1991
Scarborough	1–3	Southampton	24 September 1991
Scunthorpe United	0–0	Leeds United	24 September 1991
Sunderland	1–2	Huddersfield Town	24 September 1991
Swansea City	1–0	Tottenham Hotspur	25 September 1991
Wigan Athletic	2–2	Sheffield United	24 September 1991
Wimbledon	1–2	Peterborough United	24 September 1991
Wolverhampton Wanderers	6–1	Shrewsbury Town	24 September 1991

=== Second leg ===
Home team	Score	Away team	Date	Agg
Arsenal	2–0	Leicester City	8 October 1991	3–1
Aston Villa	1–1	Grimsby Town	9 October 1991	1–1
Barnsley	2–3	West Bromwich Albion	8 October 1991	2–3
Birmingham City	3–2	Luton Town	8 October 1991	5–4
Bolton Wanderers	2–5	Nottingham Forest	8 October 1991	2–9
Bournemouth	1–2	Middlesbrough	8 October 1991	2–3
Brighton & Hove Albion	4–2	Brentford	9 October 1991	5–6
Bristol City	2–4	Bristol Rovers	8 October 1991	5–5
Cambridge United	1–1	Manchester United	9 October 1991	1–4
Chester City	0–3	Manchester City	8 October 1991	1–6
Crystal Palace	6–1	Hartlepool United	8 October 1991	7–2
Huddersfield Town	4–0	Sunderland	9 October 1991	6–1
Ipswich Town	0–2	Derby County	8 October 1991	0–2
Leeds United	3–0	Scunthorpe United	8 October 1991	3–0
Newcastle United	1–0	Crewe Alexandra	9 October 1991	5–3
Norwich City	3–0	Charlton Athletic	9 October 1991	5–0
Notts County	3–2	Port Vale	9 October 1991	4–4
Oxford United	0–1	Portsmouth	9 October 1991	0–1
Peterborough United	2–2	Wimbledon	8 October 1991	4–3
Queens Park Rangers	5–1	Hull City	9 October 1991	8–1
Rochdale	1–0	Coventry City	8 October 1991	1–4
Sheffield United	1–0	Wigan Athletic	8 October 1991	3–2
Sheffield Wednesday	4–1	Leyton Orient	9 October 1991	4–1
Shrewsbury Town	3–1	Wolverhampton Wanderers	8 October 1991	4–7
Southampton	2–2	Scarborough	9 October 1991	5–3
Stoke City	2–3	Liverpool	9 October 1991	4–5
Swindon Town	3–1	Millwall	8 October 1991	5–3
Torquay United	0–2	Oldham Athletic	9 October 1991	1–9
Tottenham Hotspur	5–1	Swansea City	9 October 1991	5–2
Tranmere Rovers	3–1	Chelsea	8 October 1991	4–2
Watford	1–2	Everton	8 October 1991	1–3
West Ham United	4–0	Bradford City	9 October 1991	5–1

== Third round ==
=== Ties ===
Home team	Score	Away team	Date
Birmingham City	1–1	Crystal Palace	29 October 1991
Coventry City	1–0	Arsenal	30 October 1991
Everton	4–1	Wolverhampton Wanderers	30 October 1991
Grimsby Town	0–3	Tottenham Hotspur	29 October 1991
Huddersfield Town	1–4	Swindon Town	29 October 1991
Leeds United	3–1	Tranmere Rovers	29 October 1991
Liverpool	2–2	Port Vale	29 October 1991
Manchester City	0–0	Queens Park Rangers	29 October 1991
Manchester United	3–1	Portsmouth	30 October 1991
Middlesbrough	1–0	Barnsley	29 October 1991
Norwich City	4–1	Brentford	30 October 1991
Nottingham Forest	2–0	Bristol Rovers	30 October 1991
Oldham Athletic	2–1	Derby County	29 October 1991
Peterborough United	1–0	Newcastle United	29 October 1991
Sheffield United	0–2	West Ham United	29 October 1991
Sheffield Wednesday	1–1	Southampton	30 October 1991

=== Replays ===
Home team	Score	Away team	Date
Crystal Palace	1–1	Birmingham City	19 November 1991
Port Vale	1–4	Liverpool	20 November 1991
Queens Park Rangers	1–3	Manchester City	20 November 1991
Southampton	1–0	Sheffield Wednesday	20 November 1991

=== 2nd Replay ===
Home team	Score	Away team	Date
Crystal Palace	2–1	Birmingham City	3 December 1991

== Fourth round ==
=== Ties ===
Home team	Score	Away team	Date
Middlesbrough	2–1	Manchester City	3 December 1991
Peterborough United	1–0	Liverpool	3 December 1991
Coventry City	1–2	Tottenham Hotspur	4 December 1991
Everton	1–4	Leeds United	4 December 1991
Manchester United	2–0	Oldham Athletic	4 December 1991
Norwich City	2–1	West Ham United	4 December 1991
Nottingham Forest	0–0	Southampton	4 December 1991
Swindon Town	0–1	Crystal Palace	17 December 1991

=== Replay ===
Home team	Score	Away team	Date
Southampton	0–1	Nottingham Forest	17 December 1991

== Fifth Round ==
The draw was made at Trump Tower, New York and shown on ITV's Saint and Greavsie programme. Jimmy Greaves drew the home teams and Donald Trump drew the away teams.

=== Ties ===
Home team	Score	Away team	Date
Peterborough United	0–0	Middlesbrough	8 January 1992
Leeds United	1–3	Manchester United	8 January 1992
Tottenham Hotspur	2–1	Norwich City	8 January 1992
Crystal Palace	1–1	Nottingham Forest	8 January 1992

=== Replays ===
Home team	Score	Away team	Date
Nottingham Forest	4–2	Crystal Palace	5 February 1992
Middlesbrough	1–0	Peterborough United	12 February 1992

== Semi-finals ==
Four-time winners Nottingham Forest edged past Tottenham Hotspur to reach their sixth League Cup final in 15 years, while Manchester United overcame Middlesbrough to reach the final for the third time and be in a position to win it for the first time.

=== First leg ===
Home team	Score	Away team	Date
Middlesbrough	0–0	Manchester United	4 March 1992
Nottingham Forest	1–1	Tottenham Hotspur	9 February 1992

=== Second leg ===
Home team	Score	Away team	Date	Agg
Manchester United	2–1	Middlesbrough	11 March 1992	2–1
Tottenham Hotspur	1–2	Nottingham Forest	1 March 1992	2–3

== Final ==
12 April 1992
15:00 BST

Manchester United	1–0	Nottingham Forest
McClair 14'

Wembley Stadium, London
Attendance: 76,810
Referee: George Courtney (County Durham)
