= Mark Ormerod (footballer) =

English footballer

Personal information
- Full name: Mark Ian Ormerod
- Date of birth: 5 February 1976 (age 50)
- Place of birth: Bournemouth, England
- Height: 6 ft 0 in (1.83 m)
- Position: Goalkeeper

Youth career
- 19??–1992: AFC Bournemouth
- 1992–1994: Brighton & Hove Albion

Senior career*
Years	Team	Apps	(Gls)
1994–2000	Brighton & Hove Albion	85	(0)
2000	Woking	9	(0)
2000–2004	Dorchester Town		
2004	→ Worthing (loan)		
2004–200?	Worthing		
- * Club domestic league appearances and goals

Mark Ian Ormerod (born 5 February 1976) is an English former professional footballer who made 85 appearances in the Football League playing as a goalkeeper for Brighton & Hove Albion.

== Life and career ==
Ormerod was born in Bournemouth in 1976. As a schoolboy, he played for AFC Bournemouth, before taking up an apprenticeship with Brighton & Hove Albion in 1992. He signed professional forms in 1994, and acted as backup to Nicky Rust for a couple of years before making his senior debut in a Third Division match against Scarborough in September 1996. He established himself as first choice goalkeeper during that season, and went on to make 93 appearances in all competitions. Having lost his place to Mark Walton, he was given a free transfer at the end of the 1999–2000 season, and moved on to Conference club Woking.

His spell with Woking was brief, and in October 2000 he moved on to Southern Football League club Dorchester Town, managed by his former Brighton team-mate Mark Morris. He made 175 first-team appearances in four years with Dorchester, helping them gain promotion to the Southern League Premier Division in 2003, before joining Worthing of the Isthmian League, initially on loan, in 2004.

While with Brighton, he trained as a financial advisor.
