= John Jeffers =

English footballer (1968–2021)

Personal information
- Full name: John Joseph Jeffers
- Date of birth: 5 October 1968
- Place of birth: Liverpool, England
- Date of death: 20 January 2021 (aged 52)
- Height: 5 ft 10 in (1.78 m)
- Position: Left winger

Youth career
- 1984–1986: Liverpool

Senior career*
Years	Team	Apps	(Gls)
1986–1988	Liverpool	0	(0)
1988–1995	Port Vale	180	(10)
1995	→ Shrewsbury Town (loan)	3	(1)
1995–1997	Stockport County	57	(6)
1997–1998	Hednesford Town		
Total		240	(17)
- * Club domestic league appearances and goals

John Joseph Jeffers (5 October 1968 – 20 January 2021) was an English footballer who played as a left-winger. He scored 18 goals in 297 league and cup appearances in a 12-year career in the Football League.

He began his career with Liverpool in October 1986 but never made a first-team appearance before he was sold to Port Vale in February 1989 for a £30,000 fee. He helped the "Valiants" to win promotion out of the third tier in 1989 and 1993–94. Known for his dribbling and jinking runs, he was nicknamed "Jinking John Jeffers" by Vale supporters. He was loaned out to Shrewsbury Town in January 1995, he was allowed to join Stockport County in November 1995. He helped the "Hatters" to win promotion out of the Second Division and to reach the semi-finals of the League Cup in 1996–97. In October 1997, he moved into non-League football with Hednesford Town, before retiring from professional football at the end of the season.

== Career ==
=== Port Vale ===
Jeffers attended St Francis Xavier's and had a trial with England Boys. He turned professional at Kenny Dalglish's Liverpool upon completion of his Youth Training Scheme in October 1986 but was never able to provide too much first-team competition for John Barnes, and never featured at Anfield. He was loaned out to Port Vale as cover for the injured Paul Atkinson in December 1988; he was recalled by the "Reds" in February 1989 but was brought back to Port Vale permanently the next month for a fee of £30,000 and 6% sell-on clause. Preston North End and West Bromwich Albion were also keen to sign him, but Jeffers was won over by Vale chairman Bill Bell's offer of a new Austin Montego. To fund the transfer Rudge sold Steve Harper to Preston North End for £35,000. He featured in 15 Third Division games in the 1988–89 season and featured in all four play-off games, including both legs of the play-off final victory over Bristol Rovers. He scored his first league goal on 4 November 1989, in a 2–1 defeat to Oxford United at Vale Park. He played a total of 46 games in the 1989–90 season, as the "Valiants" posted a top-half finish in the Second Division.

Jeffers scored twice in 36 games during the 1990–91 campaign but started to become plagued by abdominal injuries from March onward. He scored three goals in 38 appearances in the 1991–92 season, as the "Valiants" suffered relegation in last place. He was sent home from pre-season training at the University of Stirling in the summer of 1988 after Rudge caught him leading a small group of players back from a late-night drinking session. He scored twice in 34 games in the 1992–93 season, but did not feature at Wembley either in the Football League Trophy final win over Stockport County or the play-off final defeat to West Bromwich Albion due to a groin injury. He was sent off on the opening day of the 1993–94 season within seconds of entering the game as a substitute after striking a Burnley player. He did, though help John Rudge's side to win promotion with a second-place finish in the 1993–94 campaign; they finished just one point behind champions Reading. However, Jeffers again incurred the wrath of Rudge after he slapped both Tranmere Rovers's right-back and Vale's own physiotherapist during a reserve team game. He did though win his first-team place back after serving a two-week suspension. He lost his first-team place in the 1994–95 season, as Vale posted a 17th-place finish in the second tier (known as the First Division due to the creation of the Premier League). Chairman Bill Bell looked to offload Jeffers from the wage bill after Jon McCarthy and Steve Guppy were signed to play on the wings.

=== Later career ===
Jeffers went on a one-month loan to Fred Davies's Shrewsbury Town in January 1995 and featured in three Second Division games at Gay Meadow. In August 1995, he had a trial with Second Division Stockport County before he was allowed to join the club on a free transfer in November 1995. Dave Jones's County finished just three points outside the play-offs in 1995–96, with Jeffers playing 23 league games. He scored three goals in 34 league and eight League Cup appearances in the 1996–97 season, as he helped the "Hatters" to win promotion as runners-up, two points behind champions Bury. The club also reached the semi-finals of the League Cup, defeating Chesterfield, Sheffield United, Blackburn Rovers, West Ham United and Southampton on the way. In the semi-finals, they lost 2–0 to Middlesbrough at Edgeley Park and exited the competition despite managing a 1–0 win at the Riverside Stadium. Despite these successes, he retired from professional football on medical advice and joined Conference club Hednesford Town in October 1997, and then left Keys Park and retired completely at the close of the 1997–98 season. He later attempted an unsuccessful comeback with Northwich Victoria.

== Style of play ==
Jeffers was a skilful and entertaining, though inconsistent winger. His talent made him a cult hero at Port Vale, where he was known as 'Jinking Johnny', though he could be prone to overplaying rather than delivering timely crosses.

"We would go into training and, no word of a lie, JJ could dribble past you, put it through your legs, go around the other side and dribble past you again. It was ridiculous skill. He was quick, he could cross, he could dribble and score and in big games he came up with big moments for us... He was brilliantly balanced, had lovely skill, a beautiful left foot and could beat people just with his shimmy. He didn't have to do much, just shake his shoulders and you would be running the opposite way."

— Former teammate Port Vale Robbie Earle speaking on Jeffers.

== Personal life ==
After retiring as a player, Jeffers wrote a column for the Liverpool Echo and worked in car financing, setting up his own company in Wallasey. He was the best man at Andy Porter's wedding. Jeffers died on 19 January 2021, aged 52, following a long illness. He had two sons: John and Gabriel. Francis Jeffers was his younger cousin.

== Career statistics ==
Appearances and goals by club, season and competition
Club	Season	League			FA Cup		Other		Total	
Club	Season	Division	Apps	Goals	Apps	Goals	Apps	Goals	Apps	Goals
Liverpool	1987–88	First Division	0	0	0	0	0	0	0	0
Port Vale	1988–89	Third Division	15	0	0	0	5	0	20	0
Port Vale	1989–90	Second Division	40	1	2	0	4	1	46	2
Port Vale	1990–91	Second Division	31	2	2	0	3	0	36	2
Port Vale	1991–92	Second Division	33	3	1	0	4	0	38	3
Port Vale	1992–93	Second Division	26	2	4	0	3	0	33	2
Port Vale	1993–94	Second Division	25	1	5	0	5	0	35	1
Port Vale	1994–95	First Division	10	1	1	0	0	0	11	1
Port Vale	Total		180	10	15	0	24	1	219	11
Shrewsbury Town (loan)	1994–95	Second Division	3	1	0	0	2	0	5	1
Stockport County	1995–96	Second Division	23	3	3	0	0	0	26	3
Stockport County	1996–97	Second Division	34	3	2	0	11	0	47	3
Stockport County	Total		57	6	5	0	11	0	73	6
Career total			240	17	20	0	37	1	297	18

== Honours ==
Port Vale

- Football League Third Division play-offs: 1989
- Football League Second Division second-place promotion: 1993–94

Stockport County

- Football League Second Division second-place promotion: 1996–97
