= 1986–87 Nottingham Forest F.C. season =

English football club season

Nottingham Forest
1986–87 season
- Chairman: Maurice Roworth
- Manager: Brian Clough
- Stadium: The City Ground
- First Division: 8th
- FA Cup: Second round
- League Cup: Third round
- Top goalscorer: League: Clough (14); Birtles; Webb; All: Clough (16)
Home colours	Away colours

The 1986–87 season was Nottingham Forest's 122nd year in existence and eleventh consecutive season in the First Division. Also the club competed in the FA Cup and League Cup.

== Summary ==
During summer manager Clough continued the squad rebuilding without notable transfers. Central back defender Chris Fairclough returned after a year injured, the same situation happened with veteran Forward Garry Birtles "reinforcing" the strikers line. Meanwhile, Dutch Goalkeeper Hans Segers lost his spot as starter to Steve Sutton and left the club to sign with Stoke City. The defensive line lined up Gary Fleming as right back, Walker and Metgod as Central backs and Pearce as left back. Fairclough left the squad during summer of 1987. In the midfield veteran Ian Bowyer was aided by Neil Webb, Gary Mills and Franz Carr, the line was exhausted after some bright matches (included a 6–2 at Chelsea) due to loss of form through spring and the team collapsed to 8th spot in League. Veteran Garry Birtles and Nigel Clough completed the starters squad not being aided by an already weaker midfield. The club opted out of Full Members' Cup in its 1986–87 edition.

== Squad ==
Note: Flags indicate national team as defined under FIFA eligibility rules; some limited exceptions apply. Players may hold more than one non-FIFA nationality.

Pos.	Nation	Player
GK	ENG	Steve Sutton
GK	ENG	Paul Crichton
GK	NED	Hans Segers
DF	NIR	Gary Fleming
DF	ENG	Des Walker
DF	ENG	Colin Foster
DF	ENG	Chris Fairclough
DF	ENG	Brett Williams
DF	ENG	Gary Andrews
DF	ENG	Darren Wassall
DF	ENG	Stuart Pearce (c)
MF	ENG	Franz Carr
MF	ENG	Ian Bowyer
MF	NED	Johnny Metgod

Pos.	Nation	Player
MF	ENG	Neil Webb
MF	NIR	David Campbell
MF	ENG	Gary Mills
MF	NOR	Kjetil Osvold
MF	ENG	Ray Campbell
MF	SCO	Brian Rice
MF	ENG	Calvin Plummer
FW	ENG	Phil Starbuck
FW	ENG	Garry Birtles
FW	ENG	Nigel Clough
FW	ENG	Paul Wilkinson
FW	ENG	David Riley
FW	SCO	Paul Chalmers
FW	SCO	Lee Glover

=== Transfers ===
In
Pos.	Name	from	Type
MF	Kjetil Osvold	Lillestrøm SK	£80,000
DF	Colin Foster	Leyton Orient F.C.	£50,000
MF	Calvin Plummer	Barnsley F.C.	
DF	Darren Wassall		
FW	Phil Starbuck		
FW	Lee Glover		
GK	Paul Crichton		
DF	Gary Andrews		
MF	Ray Campbell		

Out
Pos.	Name	To	Type
MF	Colin Walsh	Charlton Athletic	
DF	Jim McInally	Coventry City	£112,000
DF	Ian Butterworth	Norwich City	£160,000
MF	John Robertson		
MF	Steve Wigley	Sheffield United	
MF	Steve Hodge	Tottenham Hotspur	
MF	Steven Murray	Celtic Glasgow	
MF	Leigh Palin		
FW	Mick Perry		
GK	Darren Heyes		

==== Winter ====
In
Pos.	Name	from	Type

Out
Pos.	Name	To	Type
FW	David Riley	Darlington F.C.	£40,000
GK	Hans Segers	Stoke City	loan
MF	Calvin Plummer	Lahden Reipas	loan
DF	Ian Butterworth	Norwich City	

==== Spring ====
In
Pos.	Name	from	Type
FW	Paul Wilkinson	Everton	

Out
Pos.	Name	To	Type
FW	David Riley	Peterborough United	loan

== Results ==
=== Division One ===
==== League table ====
Pos	Team	Pld	W	D	L	GF	GA	GD	Pts
6	Chelsea	42	20	11	11	57	56	+1	71
7	Arsenal	42	20	9	13	49	47	+2	69
8	Nottingham Forest	42	19	11	12	69	53	+16	68
9	Luton Town	42	18	12	12	61	44	+17	66
10	Tottenham Hotspur	42	19	8	15	74	52	+22	65

Source: World Football
Rules for classification: 1) Points; 2) Goal difference; 3) Goals scored

==== Results by round ====
Round	1	2	3	4	5	6	7	8	9	10	11	12	13	14	15	16	17	18	19	20	21	22	23	24	25	26	27	28	29	30	31	32	33	34	35	36	37	38	39	40	41	42
Ground	A	H	H	A	H	A	A	H	H	A	H	A	A	H	H	A	H	A	H	A	H	A	A	H	H	A	A	H	H	A	H	H	A	H	H	A	A	H	A	A	H	A
Result	L	W	D	W	W	W	W	W	D	L	W	L	W	L	L	W	W	W	L	D	L	D	D	D	W	W	D	D	L	W	L	D	W	L	D	W	L	D	L	W	L	W
Position	19	9	10	3	3	1	1	1	1	2	1	1	1	2	3	2	2	2	2	2	3	4	4	4	4	4	4	4	7	5	7	6	4	6	6	6	7	7	8	7	7	8

Source: https://www.11v11.com/teams/nottingham-forest/tab/matches/season/1987/
A = Away; H = Home; W = Win; D = Draw; L = Loss; = Champions, Disqualified to 1987-88 European Cup; = Disqualified to 1987-88 UEFA Cup; = Qualified to 1986–87 Second Division play-offs; = Relegated to Division Two

==== Matches ====
- .- Source: https://www.11v11.com/teams/nottingham-forest/tab/matches/season/1987/

23 August 1986 1	Everton	2–0	Nottingham Forest	Walton
		19	27', 65' Kevin Sheedy	Stadium: Goodison Park; Attendance: 35,222; Referee: D Shaw

27 August 1986 2	Nottingham Forest	4–0	Charlton Athletic	West Bridgford
	Neil Webb 36', 72'; Garry Birtles 53'; Nigel Clough 75'	9		Stadium: City Ground; Attendance: 12,970; Referee: KS Hackett

30 August 1986 3	Nottingham Forest	1–1	Watford	West Bridgford
	Ian Bowyer 28'	10	47' Luther Blissett	Stadium: City Ground; Attendance: 14,709; Referee: JB Worrall

2 September 1986 4	West Ham Utd	1–2	Nottingham Forest	Upton Park
	Frank McAvennie 19'	3	62' Nigel Clough; 64' Neil Webb	Stadium: Boleyn Ground; Attendance: 21,305; Referee: DJ Axcell

6 September 1986 5	Southampton	1–3	Nottingham Forest	Southampton
	Colin Clarke 73'	3	Neil Webb 11', 76'; Garry Birtles 77'	Stadium: The Dell; Attendance: 14,604; Referee: LC Shapter

13 September 1986 6	Nottingham Forest	6–0	Aston Villa	West Bridgford
	Franz Carr 8'; Garry Birtles 23', 64'; Nigel Clough 46'; Neil Webb 54', 88'	1		Stadium: City Ground; Attendance: 17,045; Referee: G Courtney

20 September 1986 7	Chelsea	2–6	Nottingham Forest	Fulham
	Pat Nevin 7'; John Bumstead 10'	1	4', 38', 71'Neil Webb; 31', 43', 78' (pen.) Garry Birtles	Stadium: Stamford Bridge; Attendance: 20,171; Referee: B Hill

27 September 1986 8	Nottingham Forest	1–0	Arsenal	West Bridgford
	Nigel Clough 2'	1		Stadium: City Ground; Attendance: 25,371; Referee: D Scott

4 October 1986 9	Nottingham Forest	1–1	Manchester United	West Bridgford
	Garry Birtles 51'	1	73' Bryan Robson	Stadium: City Ground; Attendance: 35,828; Referee: KP Barratt

11 October 1986 10	Leicester City	1–3	Nottingham Forest	Leicester
	Alan Smith 53'; Gary McAllister 74', 79' (pen.)	2	43' Garry Birtles	Stadium: Filbert Street; Attendance: 18,402; Referee: JE Martin

18 October 1986 11	Nottingham Forest	1–0	Queens Park Rangers	West Bridgford
	Nigel Clough 47'	1		Stadium: City Ground; Attendance: 17,199; Referee: NJ Ashley

25 October 1986 12	Oxford United	1–2	Nottingham Forest	Oxford
	John Aldridge 27'; Ray Houghton 42'	1	70' (pen.) Stuart Pearce	Stadium: Manor Ground; Attendance: 10,249; Referee: RS Lewis

1 November 1986 13	Nottingham Forest	3–2	Sheffield Wednesday	West Bridgford
	Neil Webb 20'; Stuart Pearce 40' (pen.); Garry Birtles 73'	1	Lee Chapman 55', 80'	Stadium: City Ground; Attendance: 23,303; Referee: KJ Breen

8 November 1986 14	Coventry City	0–1	Nottingham Forest	Coventry
	Nick Pickering 54'	2		Stadium: Highfield Road; Attendance: 16,306; Referee: MG Peck

15 November 1986 15	Luton Town	2–4	Nottingham Forest	Luton
	Mark Stein 1', 8'; Steve Foster 16'; Brian Stein 68'	3	24' Ian Bowyer; 80' Garry Birtles	Stadium: Kenilworth Road; Attendance: 11,097; Referee: AN Buksh

22 November 1986 16	Nottingham Forest	3–2	Wimbledon	West Bridgford
	Nigel Clough 17' (pen.); Andy Thorn 30' (o.g.); Johnny Metgod 59'	2	2' Carlton Fairweather; 47' Glyn Hodges	Stadium: City Ground; Attendance: 15,481; Referee: PA Tyldesley

29 November 1986 17	Tottenham Hotspur	3–2	Nottingham Forest	Tottenham
	Clive Allen 37', 58'	2	2' (pen.) Stuart Pearce; 67' Chris Fairclough; 77' Neil Webb	Stadium: White Hart Lane; Attendance: 30,042; Referee: RB Gifford

6 December 1986 18	Nottingham Forest	2–0	Manchester City	West Bridgford
	Garry Birtles 48'; Franz Carr 86'	2		Stadium: City Ground; Attendance: 19,120; Referee: T Simpson

13 December 1986 19	Newcastle United	3–2	Nottingham Forest	Newcastle-upon-Tyne
	Ken Wharton 16'; Andy Thomas 68'; Peter Beardsley 85'	2	41' Phil Starbuck; 87' Franz Carr	Stadium: St James' Park; Attendance: 26,193; Referee: DT Phillips

20 December 1986 20	Nottingham Forest	0–0	Southampton	West Bridgford
		2		Stadium: City Ground

26 December 1986 21	Norwich City	1–2	Nottingham Forest	Norwich
	Ian Crook 74'; Robert Rosario 79'	3	64' Stuart Pearce	Stadium: Carrow Road; Attendance: 21,442; Referee: J Ashworth

28 December 1986 22	Nottingham Forest	2–2	Luton Town	West Bridgford
	Nigel Clough 73'; Ian Bowyer 90'	4	10' Brian Stein; 86' Mike Newell	Stadium: City Ground; Attendance: 20,273; Referee: N Midgley

1 January 1987 23	Nottingham Forest	1–1	Liverpool	West Bridgford
	Phil Starbuck 53'	4	Ian Rush 88'	Stadium: City Ground; Attendance: 32,850; Referee: C Downey

3 January 1987 24	Aston Villa	0–0	Nottingham Forest	Birmingham
		4		Stadium: Villa Park; Attendance: 19,159; Referee: NJ Ashley

25 January 1987 25	Nottingham Forest	1–0	Everton	West Bridgford
	Neil Webb 25'	4		Stadium: City Ground; Attendance: 17,009; Referee: RS Lewis

31 January 1987 26	Charlton Athletic	0–1	Nottingham Forest	South Norwood
		4	Nigel Clough 66'	Stadium: Selhurst Park; Attendance: 5,050; Referee: DA Hedges

7 February 1987 27	Watford	1–1	Nottingham Forest	Watford
	John Barnes 2'	4	51' Garry Birtles	Stadium: Vicarage Road; Attendance: 15,227; Referee: KS Hackett

14 February 1987 28	Nottingham Forest	1–1	West Ham United	West Bridgford
	Garry Birtles 42' (pen.)	4	65' (pen.) Ray Stewart	Stadium: City Ground; Attendance: 19,370; Referee: GM Tyson

28 February 1987 29	Nottingham Forest	0–1	Chelsea	West Bridgford
		7	Pat Nevin 66'	Stadium: City Ground; Attendance: 18,317; Referee: G Courtney

7 March 1987 30	Nottingham Forest	2–0	Oxford United	West Bridgford
	Nigel Clough 15', 43'	5		Stadium: City Ground; Attendance: 12,298; Referee: JB Worrall

14 March 1987 31	Queens Park Rangers	1–3	Nottingham Forest	Shepherd's Bush
	Gary Bannister 31'; Wayne Fereday 54'; Alan McDonald 70'	7	Johnny Metgod 56'	Stadium: Loftus Road; Attendance: 9,396; Referee: MD Reed

17 March 1987 32	Arsenal	0–0	Nottingham Forest	Islington
		6		Stadium: Highbury; Attendance: 18,352

22 March 1987 33	Nottingham Forest	2–1	Leicester City	West Bridgford
	Franz Carr 11'; Nigel Clough 58'	4	Ally Mauchlen 70'	Stadium: City Ground; Attendance: 18,679; Referee: F Roberts

28 March 1987 34	Manchester United	2–0	Nottingham Forest	Manchester
	Paul McGrath 12'; Bryan Robson 44'	6		Stadium: Old Trafford; Attendance: 39,182; Referee: NJ Ashley

4 April 1987 35	Nottingham Forest	0–0	Coventry City	West Bridgford
		6		Stadium: City Ground

14 April 1987 36	Sheffield Wednesday	2–3	Nottingham Forest	Sheffield
	Lee Chapman 53'David Hirst 61'	6	Nigel Clough 8', 80'Brian Rice 69'	Stadium: Hillsborough; Attendance: 18,597; Referee: JW Lloyd

18 April 1987 37	Liverpool	3–0	Nottingham Forest	Liverpool
	Kenny Dalglish 34'; Ronnie Whelan 51'; Gary Ablett 68'	7		Stadium: Anfield; Attendance: 37,359; Referee: MG Peck

20 April 1987 38	Nottingham Forest	1–1	Norwich City	West Bridgford
	Nigel Clough 79'	7	63' Robert Rosario	Stadium: City Ground; Attendance: 14,446; Referee: NS Butler

25 April 1987 39	Wimbledon	1–2	Nottingham Forest	Wimbledon
	Glyn Hodges 28' (pen.); John Fashanu 78'	8	Stuart Pearce 19' (pen.)	Stadium: Plough Lane; Attendance: 5,005; Referee: DA Hedges

2 May 1987 40	Nottingham Forest	2–0	Tottenham Hotspur	West Bridgford
	Neil Webb 54'; Johnny Metgod 65'	7		Stadium: City Ground; Attendance: 19,837; Referee: JE Martin

4 May 1987 41	Manchester City	1–0	Nottingham Forest	Moss Side
	Imre Varadi 8'	7		Stadium: Maine Road; Attendance: 21,405; Referee: J Lovatt

9 May 1987 42	Nottingham Forest	2–1	Newcastle United	West Bridgford
	Colin Foster 35'; Stuart Pearce 41' (pen.)	8	70' Gascoigne	Stadium: City Ground; Attendance: 17,780; Referee: C Downey

=== League Cup ===
==== Second Round ====
24 September 1986	Brighton & Hove Albion	0–0	Nottingham Forest	Brighton and Hove
				Stadium: Goldstone Ground

8 October 1986 replay	Nottingham Forest	3–0	Brighton and Hove Albion	West Bridgford
	Franz Carr 35', 61'; Stuart Pearce 76' (pen.)			Stadium: City Ground; Attendance: 16,036; Referee: DB Allison

==== Third Round ====
29 October 1986	Crystal Palace	2–2	Nottingham Forest	South Norwood
	Alan Irvine 14'; Andy Gray 69'		39' (pen.) Stuart Pearce; 72' Garry Birtles	Stadium: Selhurst Park; Attendance: 12,020; Referee: BT Stevens

5 November 1986 replay	Nottingham Forest	1–0	Crystal Palace	West Bridgford
	Nigel Clough 77'			Stadium: City Ground; Attendance: 13,029; Referee: R Bridges

==== Fourth Round ====
19 November 1986	Bradford City	0–5	Nottingham Forest	Bradford
			30' Franz Carr; 38' Johnny Metgod; 43' Nigel Clough; 73' Gary Mills; 80' Chris Fairclough	Stadium: Odsal Stadium; Attendance: 16,009; Referee: A Seville

==== Fifth Round ====
21 January 1987	Arsenal	2–0	Nottingham Forest	Islington
	Charlie Nicholas 2'; Martin Hayes 39'			Stadium: Highbury; Attendance: 38,617; Referee: B Hill

=== FA Cup ===
==== Third round ====
11 January 1987 3	Crystal Palace	1–0	Nottingham Forest	South Norwood
	Alan Irvine 23'			Stadium: Selhurst Park; Attendance: 11,618; Referee: LC Shapter

== Statistics ==
=== Squad statistics ===
No.	Pos	Nat	Player	Total		Football League Division One		FA Cup		Football League Cup	
No.	Pos	Nat	Player	Apps	Goals	Apps	Goals	Apps	Goals	Apps	Goals
	GK	(England) ENG	Steve Sutton	31	0	28	0	0	0	3	0
	DF	(Northern Ireland) NIR	Gary Fleming	38	0	34	0	1	0	3	0
	DF	(England) ENG	Des Walker	48	0	41	0	1	0	6	0
	DF	(Netherlands) NED	Johnny Metgod	44	4	36+1	3	1	0	6	1
	DF	(England) ENG	Stuart Pearce	44	8	39	6	0	0	5	2
	MF	(England) ENG	Gary Mills	38	1	27+5	0	1	0	4+1	1
	MF	(England) ENG	Ian Bowyer	40	3	35	3	1	0	4	0
	MF	(England) ENG	Neil Webb	39	14	32	14	1	0	6	0
	MF	(England) ENG	Franz Carr	42	7	36	4	0	0	6	3
	FW	(England) ENG	Nigel Clough	49	16	42	14	1	0	6	2
	FW	(England) ENG	Garry Birtles	33	15	28	14	0	0	5	1
	GK	(Netherlands) NED	Hans Segers	18	0	14	0	1	0	3	0
	DF	(England) ENG	Chris Fairclough	30	2	24+2	1	1	0	2+1	1
	MF	(Northern Ireland) NIR	David Campbell	18	0	14	0	0+1	0	3	0
	FW	(England) ENG	Paul Wilkinson	8	0	8	0	0	0	0	0
	DF	(England) ENG	Colin Foster	9	1	7+2	1	0	0	0	0
	DF	(England) ENG	Ian Butterworth	7	0	4	0	0	0	3	0
	MF	(Norway) NOR	Kjetil Osvold	4	0	4	0	0	0	0	0
	FW	(England) ENG	Phil Starbuck	6	2	3+2	2	1	0	0	0
	MF	(Scotland) SCO	Brian Rice	4	1	3	1	0	0	0+1	0
	DF	(England) ENG	Brett Williams	5	0	3	0	1	0	1	0
	FW	(England) ENG	David Riley	1	0	0+1	0	0	0	0	0
	DF	(England) ENG	Gary Andrews	1	0	0	0	0	0	0+1	0
	MF	(Northern Ireland) NIR	Ray Campbell	0	0	0	0	0	0	0	0
	FW	(Scotland) SCO	Paul Chalmers	0	0	0	0	0	0	0	0
	GK	(England) ENG	Paul Crichton	0	0	0	0	0	0	0	0
	FW	(Scotland) SCO	Lee Glover	1	0	0	0	0	0	0+1	0
	MF	(England) ENG	Calvin Plummer	0	0	0	0	0	0	0	0
	DF	(England) ENG	Darren Wassall	0	0	0	0	0	0	0	0

- Source: https://www.11v11.com/teams/nottingham-forest/tab/players/season/1987/
