= David Riley (footballer) =

English footballer (born 1960)

Personal information
- Full name: David Sidney Riley
- Date of birth: 8 December 1960 (age 65)
- Place of birth: Northampton, England
- Height: 5 ft 7 in (1.70 m)
- Positions: Midfielder; forward

Senior career*
Years	Team	Apps	(Gls)
198?–198?	Shepshed Charterhouse		
198?–1983	Keyworth United		
1983–1987	Nottingham Forest	12	(2)
1987	→ Darlington (loan)	6	(2)
1987	→ Peterborough United (loan)	12	(2)
1987–1990	Port Vale	76	(11)
1990–1992	Peterborough United	84	(23)
1992–199?	Kettering Town		
199?–1993	Mount Albert-Ponsonby		
1993–1994	Boston United	34	(10)
1994–199?	King's Lynn		
Total		224+	(50+)
- * Club domestic league appearances and goals

David Sidney Riley (born 8 December 1960) is an English former footballer who played as a midfielder and striker, making 190 league appearances in a nine-year career in the Football League, scoring 40 goals.

He began his career at Nottingham Forest in 1983 and had loan spells at Darlington and Peterborough United, before joining Port Vale for £20,000 in October 1987. In March 1990 he was sold to Peterborough United for £40,000. He helped the club to two successive promotions into the Second Division. He later played for Kettering Town, Mount Albert-Ponsonby (in New Zealand), Boston United, and King's Lynn.

== Career ==
=== Nottingham Forest ===
Riley played for Shepshed Charterhouse and Keyworth United before leaving his job as a sales representative to turn professional with Brian Clough's Nottingham Forest at the age of 23 in June 1983. Clough had seen him play in a reserve team game and said, "son, I don't give a fuck how old are you, if you can score goals like that". He had been recommended to Forest by goalkeeping coach and former Shepshed manager Alan Hill. Riley played 12 First Division games for the club between April 1984 and 1987, scoring two goals. He tore his cruciate ligament in 1985–86 pre-season and was out of action for 18 months. He was loaned out to Darlington in February 1987, and played six Third Division games for Cyril Knowles' side, scoring two goals. He joined Fourth Division side Peterborough United on loan in 1987, and played twelve league games under Noel Cantwell, scoring two goals. Peterborough tried to sign him but were unable to as the club headed for administration.

=== Port Vale ===
Riley joined Third Division club Port Vale in October 1987, manager John Rudge splashing out £20,000. He scored on his debut at Vale Park in a 2–1 win over Bristol Rovers on 19 October. He became the club's joint-top scorer in the 1987–88 season with 10 goals, along with Darren Beckford. He played in the FA Cup fourth round victory over Tottenham Hotspur on 30 January 1988, getting the better of former Forest teammates Steve Hodge and Chris Fairclough.

He then switched to left-wing to cover for the injured Paul Atkinson. Ron Futcher was signed in August 1988 and initially kept Riley out of the first XI, and despite interest from Walsall for Riley's services, Rudge refused his repeated transfer requests. Winger Paul Atkinson then injured his ankle, which left a space in the team for Riley to start matches again. However, his main task was to protect left-back Darren Hughes. He played 48 league and cup games in the 1988–89 season, but broke his leg in a 1–1 draw at Bolton Wanderers on 25 April 1989, and so missed out on the play-off final victory over Bristol Rovers. He managed to recover, but did not re-capture his first-team position and in March 1990 was loaned back to Peterborough United, who were then under Mark Lawrenson's stewardship; Peterborough paid £40,000 for his services permanently the next month.

=== Later career ===
Riley won promotion with the "Posh" in 1990–91, helping Chris Turner's side to the fourth and final promotion place in the Fourth Division. They then won a second-successive promotion into the Second Division after beating Stockport County 2–1 in the play-off final at Wembley. Riley then joined Conference National club Kettering Town and later played for Mount Albert-Ponsonby in New Zealand, before returning to England with non-League sides Boston United and King's Lynn.

== Style of play ==
Riley was a versatile midfielder and forward; at just 5 ft 7 in (1.70 m) in height, he was small and lacked pace but was a hard-working player.

== Later life ==
By March 2011, he was working as under-15s manager at Peterborough United. He found work at Klassic Kitchens Company in nearby Yaxley. He married Fred Barber's cousin.

== Career statistics ==
Appearances and goals by club, season and competition
Club	Season	League			FA Cup		Other		Total	
Club	Season	Division	Apps	Goals	Apps	Goals	Apps	Goals	Apps	Goals
Nottingham Forest	1983–84	First Division	1	0	0	0	0	0	1	0
Nottingham Forest	1984–85	First Division	10	2	0	0	1	0	11	2
Nottingham Forest	1985–86	First Division	0	0	0	0	0	0	0	0
Nottingham Forest	1986–87	First Division	1	0	0	0	0	0	1	0
Nottingham Forest	Total		12	2	0	0	1	0	13	2
Darlington (loan)	1986–87	Third Division	6	2	0	0	0	0	6	2
Peterborough United (loan)	1987–88	Fourth Division	12	2	0	0	4	1	16	3
Port Vale	1987–88	Third Division	34	8	7	1	2	1	43	10
Port Vale	1988–89	Third Division	40	3	3	1	5	0	48	4
Port Vale	1989–90	Second Division	2	0	1	0	2	0	5	0
Port Vale	Total		76	11	11	2	9	1	96	14
Peterborough United	1989–90	Fourth Division	15	5	0	0	0	0	15	5
Peterborough United	1990–91	Fourth Division	41	9	5	2	4	0	50	11
Peterborough United	1991–92	Third Division	28	9	3	1	12	2	41	12
Peterborough United	Total		84	23	8	3	16	2	108	28
Boston United	1992–93	Conference	0	0	0	0	1	0	1	0
Boston United	1993–94	Northern Premier League; Premier Division	34	10	3	1	5	0	42	11
Boston United	Total		34	10	3	1	6	0	43	11
Career total			224	50	22	6	36	4	282	60

== Honours ==
Peterborough United

- Football League Fourth Division fourth-place promotion: 1990–91
- Football League Third Division play-offs: 1992
