= Martin Foyle =

English association football player

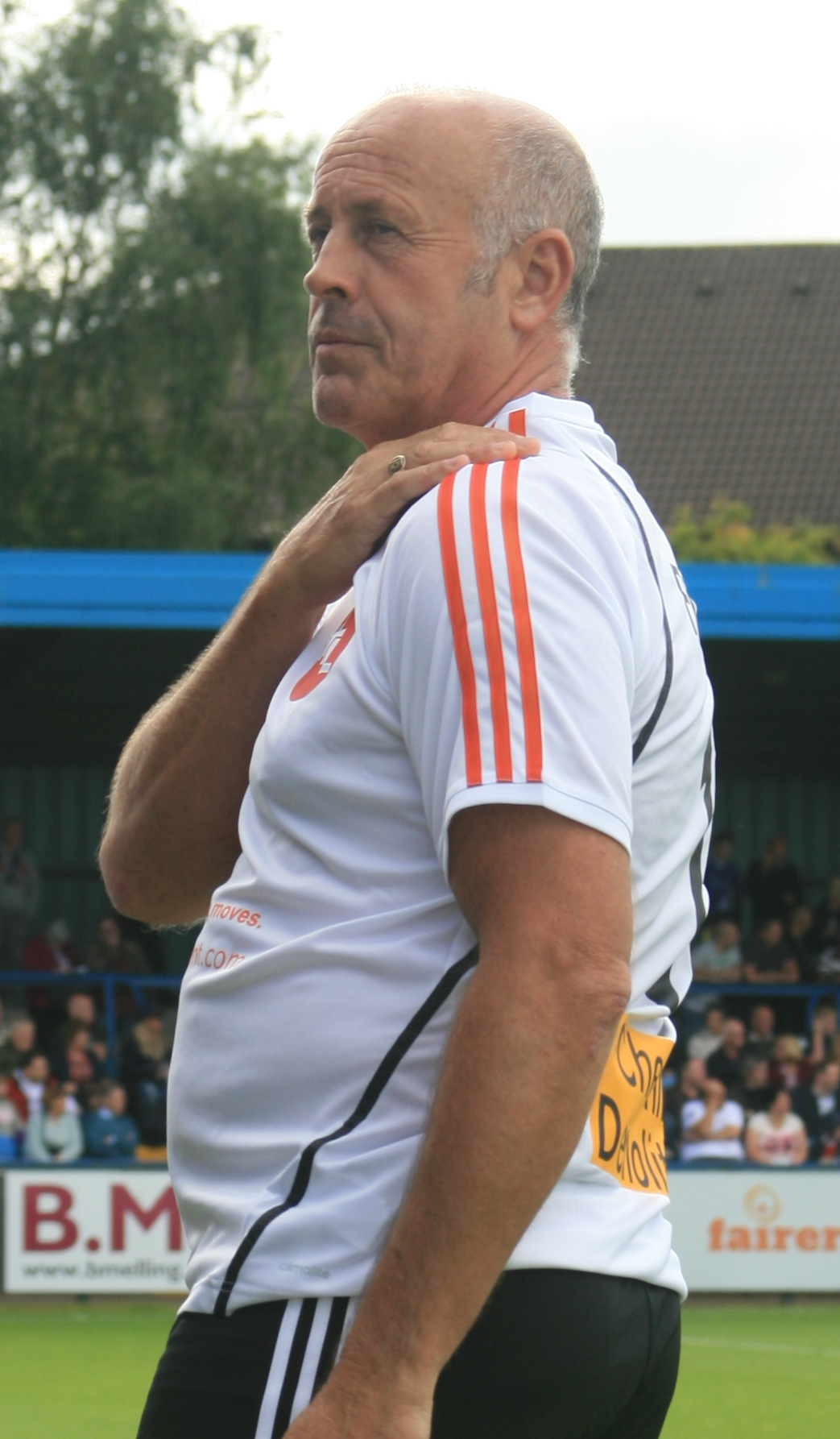
- Foyle playing in a charity match in 2015

Personal information
- Full name: Martin John Foyle
- Date of birth: 2 May 1963 (age 63)
- Place of birth: Salisbury, England
- Height: 5 ft 10 in (1.78 m)
- Position: Striker

Youth career
- Bemerton Athletic
- 1980: Southampton

Senior career*
Years	Team	Apps	(Gls)
1980–1984	Southampton	13	(1)
1982	→ IFK Munkfors (loan)	22	(30)
1984	→ Blackburn Rovers (loan)	0	(0)
1984–1987	Aldershot	98	(35)
1987–1991	Oxford United	126	(36)
1991–2000	Port Vale	296	(83)
Total		555	(185)

Managerial career
- 2004–2007: Port Vale
- 2008: Wrexham (caretaker)
- 2008–2010: York City
- 2012: Northwich Victoria
- 2012–2014: Hereford United
- 2014: Southport
- * Club domestic league appearances and goals

Martin John Foyle (born 2 May 1963) is an English former professional footballer and manager who is the chief scout at EFL League Two club Port Vale. In his 20-year playing career, he played 533 League games, scoring 155 goals. As a manager, he took charge of Port Vale and York City, Northwich Victoria, Hereford United and Southport.

Foyle started his career with Southampton as a trainee, and after spending four years at the club, during which he was loaned out on two occasions, he joined Aldershot for a £10,000 fee in August 1984. A £140,000 move to Oxford United followed in March 1987, and he became Port Vale's record signing when they paid £375,000 for him in June 1991. He spent nine seasons at the club, scoring 108 goals in 353 appearances. He was twice voted the club's Player of the Year and helped the Vale to win the Football League Trophy in 1993.

After retiring as a player, he managed Port Vale's youth team and, in February 2004, took charge of first-team affairs, eventually leaving the club in September 2007 by mutual consent. A spell as caretaker manager at Wrexham preceded his appointment as manager of York City in November 2008. Foyle took York to an FA Trophy final and Conference Premier play-off final, but resigned in September 2010. He was put in charge of Northwich Victoria for three months in February 2012 before being appointed manager at Hereford United in May 2012. He stayed with Hereford until departing in March 2014. He was appointed as Southport manager in May 2014 but resigned five months later. In 2015, he embarked on a new career as a Head of recruitment, working at Northampton Town, Motherwell, Morecambe, St Mirren and Carlisle United, and then chief scout at Port Vale.

== Playing career ==
=== Southampton ===
"It was a great, well-run club, but it was hard to get a look-in. There were 12 or 13 internationals and some of them couldn't get in the side."

— Foyle speaking to the Southern Daily Echo in 2010

Foyle was born in Salisbury, Wiltshire, where he made his name in local football before Football League referee Tony Glasson saw him playing for Bemerton Athletic and recommended him to Lawrie McMenemy, manager of Southampton. He joined Southampton as a trainee in 1980, signing as a professional on 13 August of that year. He had grown up supporting the club and would get to play alongside his idol, Mick Channon.

He spent the summer of 1982 from May to October playing on loan with Swedish Division 5 side IFK Munkfors, which helped his development, scoring 30 goals in 22 appearances as Munkfors were promoted for the first time since 1959. Shortly after his return to Southampton he made his first-team debut on 15 January 1983 in a 1–1 draw at home to Coventry City.

On 25 October 1983, he came on as a second-half substitute for Ian Baird in a League Cup match at home to Carlisle United. His 86th-minute goal brought the tie level on aggregate. It was followed by the winner in extra time. In the next round, Foyle came on as a sixth-minute substitute for Mark Wright, who had broken his nose in a collision with his goalkeeper, Alistair Sperring, but was unable to prevent Southampton going out 2–1 to Rotherham United. He spent a few weeks on loan with Blackburn Rovers in March 1984, without making any first-team appearances, before joining Aldershot on 3 August 1984 for a fee of £10,000.

=== Aldershot ===
He made 98 appearances and scored 35 goals in the league for Aldershot, as the "Shots" posted mid-table finishes in the Fourth Division in 1984–85 under Ron Harris. Foyle was named as Aldershot Town Player of the Season for the 1984–85 campaign. Harris was replaced by Len Walker for the 1985–86 campaign, and another mid-table finish ensued. The club won promotion in 1986–87 after beating Wolverhampton Wanderers 3–0 in the play-off final. However, Foyle missed out on the celebrations, as he was transferred to Oxford United on 26 March 1987 for a fee of £140,000, of which Southampton received £40,000.

=== Oxford United ===
He featured for Oxford in the First Division during two seasons and scored 44 goals in 151 appearances for the club. The club avoided a relegation play-off in 1986–87 by two points, before a last-place finish in 1987–88, after which manager Maurice Evans was replaced by Mark Lawrenson. Lawrenson resigned in October 1988, and was replaced by Brian Horton; Oxford then posted mid-table finishes in the Second Division in 1988–89, 1989–90, and 1990–91. He missed two-thirds of the 1989–90 season with injury.

=== Port Vale ===
He signed for Port Vale on 25 June 1991 for a club record fee of £375,000. He was signed as a replacement for Darren Beckford and was convinced to sign for the club by manager John Rudge and chairman Bill Bell, who sufficiently impressed enough for him to reject the opportunity to speak to other clubs. Foyle had wanted to move north and was persuaded by Rudge's persisitence and the opportunity of playing in a strike partnership with Beckford, although Beckford was sold shortly after Foyle's arrival. Foyle's transfer fee of £375,000 was set by a tribunal after Oxford asked for £700,000, and Vale offered £200,000. His first game was against his former club, Oxford, at Vale Park, and he scored both goals in a 2–1 win. Although he finished as leading scorer in the 1991–92 campaign with 16 goals, the club finished bottom of the Second Division that season and were relegated.

During the following season, Foyle was part of the team which won the Football League Trophy and narrowly missed out on automatic promotion before losing the play-off final against West Bromwich Albion. He played from the start of the Football League Trophy final win over Stockport County and provided an assist for Bernie Slaven's goal. He returned to Wembley a week later for the play-off final, which ended in a 3–0 defeat. He opened the home campaign of the 1993–94 season with a hat-trick in a 6–0 win over Barnet, scoring a left-footed, right-footed and headed goal. He ended the season with 18 goals, Foyle was again the club's leading scorer as the club finally achieved promotion in 1994. One of his 20 goals in the 1994–95 season was the winner in Vale's 1–0 victory in the Potteries derby at the Victoria Ground in 1995, and later he was voted as the club's player of the year for 1995. He played in the 1996 Anglo-Italian Cup final, scoring twice as Vale lost 5–2 to Genoa. He scored against Everton at Goodison Park in the FA Cup, which he later said was his most enjoyable goal; the match finished 2–2 and Vale went on to win the replay. In 1998–99 the ageing striker became the club's top scorer for a fourth time, with nine goals.

During his time at Port Vale, Foyle scored 108 goals, which made him the club's record post-war goalscorer until Tom Pope overtook this tally in 2020. Some of his important goals include a late equaliser in a League Cup tie at Liverpool in 1991, two at Brighton which sealed promotion in 1994, and one in a game at Huddersfield Town in 1998 which saved the club from relegation. In May 2019, he was voted into the "Ultimate Port Vale XI" by members of the OneValeFan supporter website. In December 2025, supporters voted him onto the all-time Port Vale XI on the club's official website.

== Coaching and management career ==
=== Port Vale ===
Persistent knee injuries forced him to retire from football at the age of 36 in 2000, but he stayed at the club as manager of the youth team. Foyle took over first-team responsibilities at the club on 13 February 2004 after Brian Horton left by mutual consent, and the team narrowly missed out on a play-off place on goal difference at the end of the 2003–04 season. Following the end of the season, Foyle aimed to keep players at the club, but eventually lost top scorer Stephen McPhee and midfielder Marc Bridge-Wilkinson. The club also had to make massive cut backs due to having just come out of administration and when Steve Brooker (a player signed by Horton on Foyle's recommendation) was sold to Bristol City any chance of a play-off push was unlikely. Vale eventually finished 17th in a frustrating season where many players suffered injuries leaving the squad threadbare on more than one occasion. The next two seasons saw an increase in the playing budget as Vale got their house in order after administration, and Foyle steered the side to 13th and 12th-place finishes in League One. He was nominated for the League One Manager of the Month award for February 2006. Two cup runs to the fourth round of the FA Cup in 2005–06 and fourth round of the League Cup in 2006–07, coupled with the selling of players such as Chris Birchall and Billy Paynter saw the club make a profit on the financial front. He also signed striker Akpo Sodje from Darlington, who would be sold to Sheffield Wednesday for a reported £300,000 a year later. Showing a talent for signing attackers, he bought striker Leon Constantine for £20,000 from Torquay United, who would hit 26 goals in the 2006–07 season; attacking midfielder Danny Whitaker from Macclesfield Town, who would have a long and successful career; and winger Jeff Smith, who impressed enough to win a £60,000 transfer to Carlisle United.

Despite the improvements, the standard of football on offer was becoming a concern to some, with losses to League Two Hereford United in the FA Cup and at eventually relegated Chesterfield singled out in particular for criticism. Foyle did enough to stave off the critics at the end of the 2006–07 season with some improved performances, which saw the side finish in the top half. With a positive pre-season, which included beating a young Manchester United team and some exciting prospects signing, things appeared to be looking up, with chairman Bill Bratt claiming that the club's ambition would be challenging for play-off places. However, the team had a poor start to the 2007–08 campaign, claiming just five points from their first seven games, scoring just three goals and also losing in the League Cup to League Two Wrexham. Foyle's tenure as Port Vale manager ended on 26 September 2007, as he left the club by mutual consent. New signing Marc Richards, who Foyle had been tracking for months, picked up an injury at the start of the season and was unable to contribute, though would justify Foyle's faith in him with 75 goals over the next five years.

=== Wrexham ===
He revealed his interest in taking the vacant managerial position at Lincoln City in October, but he eventually joined Wrexham in January 2008 as first-team coach to manager Brian Little and signed a new two-year contract with the club in May. He and Brian Carey took over as joint-caretaker managers on 27 September 2008 after Little left the club during their first season in the Conference Premier, while Foyle was placed as the bookmaker's favourites to succeed Little. They were in control for the 1–1 draw against Torquay United,. However, Foyle left the club after Dean Saunders was appointed as manager on 2 October 2008.

=== York City ===
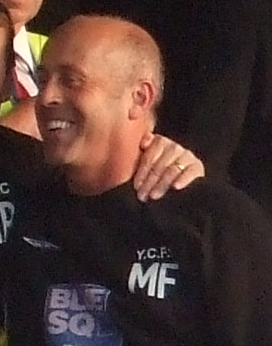
Foyle as York City manager in 2009

Foyle was appointed as manager of Conference Premier side York City on 24 November 2008, following the club's sacking of Colin Walker. Foyle's first game in charge finished in a 1–1 draw at his home town club, Salisbury City, who were managed by his former Southampton teammate Nick Holmes. He said he was pleased with how the players reacted to his ideas following the match, although he branded some of the team as "weak-hearted" following a 2–1 defeat to Altrincham in December. He managed York to the 2009 FA Trophy final at Wembley Stadium on 9 May 2009, which was lost 2–0 to Stevenage Borough.

Foyle won the Conference Manager of the Month award for November after York won four league games and progressed to the FA Cup third round. After York finished the 2009–10 season in fifth place, he guided the team to the 2010 Conference Premier play-off final at Wembley, where they were beaten 3–1 by Oxford. He resigned on 24 September with York 15th in the table, 10 games into the 2010–11 season. Following this, his assistant manager at York, Andy Porter, commented Foyle had been "sending his CV off everywhere" and was interviewed for the position of manager at League Two side Hereford United, being placed on a shortlist of seven. He was placed on a four-man shortlist for the Mansfield Town managerial vacancy in December.

=== Bristol Rovers ===
Foyle was appointed first-team coach at League One club Bristol Rovers on 21 January 2011. However, he left the club on 7 March following the sacking of manager Dave Penney. After being interviewed twice for the managerial vacancy at Conference club Newport County in March he failed to make a shortlist of three for the job.

=== Northwich Victoria ===
Foyle was appointed manager of Northern Premier League Premier Division side Northwich Victoria on a contract until the end of the 2011–12 season on 27 February 2012. His team finished as the division's runners-up, but were relegated after a hearing found that the club had broken financial rules. Foyle had played no part in the financial irregularities, as it was a matter relating to the club's creditors. He stepped down as manager to make way for Alan Wright on 9 May 2012.

=== Hereford United ===
Foyle was appointed manager of newly relegated Conference club Hereford United on 30 May 2012. He appointed Andy Porter as his assistant. His first signings were defender Luke Graham and goalkeeper James Bittner on free transfers from Forest Green Rovers. Three further free transfers arrived in defenders Andy Gallinagh and Chris Carruthers, and attacker Marlon Jackson. He further added wingers Marley Watkins and Ryan Bowman to bring his squad to 18 players. More youngsters arrived in the form of loanee Tom Nichols and former Birmingham City youth team midfielder Ashley Sammons.

Going into the season, he further bolstered the squad's links to Forest Green by bringing in striker Phil Marsh and defender Chris Todd on loan. The "Bulls" began the season in impressive form defensively, but soon became afflicted with injuries to numerous members of the small squad. Financial problems became acute, as player's wage payments were missed. Despite this, Foyle masterminded a 3–1 FA Cup giant-killing over nearby League Two side Shrewsbury Town. Hereford finished in sixth place in the league, ten points outside the play-off places.

Hereford struggled in the 2013–14 season, and off the pitch faced a serious financial crisis, which meant that Foyle admitted the entire playing staff would have to leave the club in the summer of 2014. Despite this, he won the Conference Manager of the Month award for January 2014 after Hereford went four games unbeaten amidst their growing financial crisis. Foyle parted company with Hereford on 19 March 2014, with the club in 18th place, four points above the relegation zone.

Following continuing non-payment of money owed to him by the club, Foyle issued a winding-up petition against Hereford United Football Club (1939) Ltd.

=== Southport ===
He returned to management by joining Conference Premier side Southport on 4 May 2014, following the departure of John Coleman. Two months later he began coaching the under-15 side at the Port Vale Academy. With Southport sitting in the Conference Premier relegation zone following a 5–2 defeat to Woking at Haig Avenue, he left the club by mutual consent on 5 October 2014.

== Head of Recruitment ==
Foyle was named as Head of Recruitment at Northampton Town in February 2015. He went on to work as chief scout at Scottish Premiership club Motherwell the following year. Speaking in September 2019, "Well" scout Martyn Corrigan credited Foyle with bringing a high calibre of players to Fir Park, calling him a "workaholic" with an encyclopedic knowledge of the English football's lower leagues. He returned to Northampton Town in his former role as Head of Recruitment in May 2021. He left Northampton Town in November 2021 to become Morecambe's Head of Recruitment. He left the role six months later. He joined Scottish Premiership side St Mirren as Head of Recruitment in June 2022. He spent three years at the club, before moving south to work the same role at Carlisle United. Head of Football Operations Marc Tierney remarked that "his extensive experience, deep knowledge of the game and clear understanding of what our club needs made him the ideal choice for this pivotal role". Carlisle released a statement in May 2026 to say that he would remain at the club despite speculation linking Foyle with a return to his former club Port Vale. However, he was announced as Port Vale's new chief scout the following month.

== Personal life ==
Foyle married Jacqueline Churchill in Salisbury in 1985.

== Career statistics ==
=== Playing statistics ===
Appearances and goals by club, season and competition
Club	Season	League			FA Cup		Other^{[A]}		Total^{[B]}	
Club	Season	Division	Apps	Goals	Apps	Goals	Apps	Goals	Apps	Goals
Southampton	1982–83	First Division	8	1	0	0	0	0	8	1
Southampton	1983–84	First Division	5	0	0	0	2	2	7	2
Southampton	Total		13	1	0	0	2	2	15	3
Blackburn Rovers (loan)	1983–84	Second Division	0	0	0	0	0	0	0	0
Aldershot	1984–85	Fourth Division	44	15	3	0	8	3	55	18
Aldershot	1985–86	Fourth Division	20	9	1	0	2	2	23	11
Aldershot	1986–87	Fourth Division	34	11	4	3	6	0	44	14
Aldershot	Total		98	35	8	3	16	5	122	43
Oxford United	1986–87	First Division	4	0	0	0	0	0	4	0
Oxford United	1987–88	First Division	33	10	2	1	7	0	42	13
Oxford United	1988–89	Second Division	40	14	2	0	3	1	45	15
Oxford United	1989–90	Second Division	13	2	0	0	2	1	15	3
Oxford United	1990–91	Second Division	36	10	1	2	8	3	45	15
Oxford United	Total		126	36	5	3	20	5	151	44
Port Vale	1991–92	Second Division	43	11	1	0	6	5	50	16
Port Vale	1992–93	Second Division	16	4	4	3	9	3	29	10
Port Vale	1993–94	Second Division	37	18	3	1	5	2	45	21
Port Vale	1994–95	First Division	42	16	2	3	4	1	48	20
Port Vale	1995–96	First Division	25	8	4	2	5	4	34	14
Port Vale	1996–97	First Division	37	3	1	0	5	1	43	4
Port Vale	1997–98	First Division	39	8	2	0	2	0	43	8
Port Vale	1998–99	First Division	35	9	0	0	2	0	37	9
Port Vale	1999–2000	First Division	22	6	1	0	1	0	24	6
Port Vale	Total		296	83	18	9	39	16	353	108
Career total			533	155	31	15	77	28	641	198

A. The "Other" column constitutes appearances and goals in the League Cup, Football League Trophy, Football League play-offs, Full Members Cup, and Anglo-Italian Cup.
B. Statistics for IFK Munkfors not included.

=== Managerial statistics ===
As of 5 October 2014

Managerial record by team and tenure
Team	From	To	Record					Ref
Team	From	To	P	W	D	L	Win %	Ref
Port Vale	13 February 2004	26 September 2007	184	68	34	82	37.0	
Wrexham (caretaker)	27 September 2008	2 October 2008	1	0	1	0	0.0	
York City	24 November 2008	24 September 2010	102	44	30	28	43.1	
Northwich Victoria	27 February 2012	9 May 2012	14	8	2	4	57.1	
Hereford United	30 May 2012	19 March 2014	93	33	26	34	35.5	
Southport	4 May 2014	5 October 2014	14	3	2	9	21.4	
Total			408	156	95	157	38.2	—

== Honours ==
Port Vale

- Football League Trophy: 1992–93

Individual

- Aldershot Town Player of the Season: 1984–85
- Port Vale Player of the Year: 1995, 1999
- Conference Premier Manager of the Month: January 2014
- Port Vale Hall of Fame: inducted 2026 (inaugural)
