= 1988–89 Port Vale F.C. season =

Port Vale F.C.
1988–89 season
- Chairman: Bill Bell
- Manager: John Rudge
- Stadium: Vale Park
- Football League Third Division: 3rd (84 points) play-off winners
- FA Cup: Third Round (eliminated by Norwich City)
- League Cup: Second Round (eliminated by Ipswich Town)
- Associate Members' Cup: Preliminary Round (eliminated by Wolverhampton Wanderers)
- Player of the Year: Mark Grew
- Top goalscorer: League: Darren Beckford (20); All: Darren Beckford (23)
- Highest home attendance: 17,353 vs. Bristol Rovers, 3 June 1989
- Lowest home attendance: 1,893 vs. Hereford United, 21 November 1988
- Average home league attendance: 6,731
- Biggest win: 5–0 and 6–1
- Biggest defeat: 1–5 vs. Wolverhampton Wanderers, 13 December 1988
Home colours	Away colours

The 1988–89 season was Port Vale's 77th season of football in the English Football League, and third-successive (18th overall) season in the Third Division. Under manager John Rudge and chairman Bill Bell, Vale achieved promotion to the Second Division after finishing third with 84 points, and clinched their place via a 2–1 aggregate win over Bristol Rovers in the play-off final. Their promotion was hard-fought, as they were narrowly pipped to the second automatic promotion spot by Sheffield United, especially amid a challenging second half of the season disrupted by an injury crisis.

Vale's cup runs were modest: they reached the Third Round of the FA Cup, were knocked out in the Second Round of the League Cup, and exited in the Preliminary Round of the Associate Members' Cup. Darren Beckford emerged as a key figure — and top scorer — with 20 league goals and 23 in all competitions. Other standouts included strike partner Ron Futcher, defender Simon Mills, and midfield duo Ray Walker and Robbie Earle, while goalkeeper Mark Grew earned the Player of the Year accolade. The season also saw club stalwarts Andy Porter and Dean Glover make their debuts, while Andy Jones returned on loan but failed to impress during what would be Phil Sproson's final season at Vale Park.

In terms of attendance, the highest home crowd was 17,353 for the play-off final second leg against Bristol Rovers on 3 June 1989, while the lowest was just 1,893 in a league match against Hereford United on 21 November 1988, with a season average of 6,731. The club recorded emphatic largest wins of 5–0 and 6–1, though their heaviest defeat was a 5–1 loss to Wolverhampton Wanderers on 13 December 1988.

Vale's resilience through mid‑season injuries and a tight promotion race, together with the prolific Beckford and influential performances across the squad, powered their return to the Second Division via the play-offs.

== Overview ==
=== Third Division ===
The pre-season saw Vale Park given a £40,000 upgrade to repair the floodlights, whilst a £20,000 electronic scoreboard was installed at the Hamil End. Three executive boxes were also purchased from Newcastle United, whilst facilities were opened to the local community. Manager John Rudge made a £40,000 offer for Bristol City's left-sided midfielder Alan Walsh, which was rejected. He also made inquiries for Nigel Gleghorn and Marc North. Ray Walker put in a transfer request, which was rejected. Rudge's first purchase of the season was Sunderland's left-sided midfielder Paul Atkinson, with a tribunal setting the fee at £20,000; Rudge stated that he "has the ability to produce the sort of crosses that win games". His next target was a striker, though he had a £70,000 bid for Hull City's Andy Saville rejected. Attempts to capture Imre Varadi, Wayne Biggins, Keith Bertschin, Andy Jones, and John Pearson all failed. Ian Moores began training with the club, but was not offered a contract. Despite interest from at least three other clubs (particularly Mansfield Town), Rudge signed Ron Futcher, Bradford City's top-scorer, for a £35,000 fee. The veteran striker said "I could have done better for myself elsewhere, but Vale have a lot more potential." Another new arrival was young Brighton & Hove Albion goalkeeper Trevor Wood on a free transfer. The Vale were unbeaten in their seven pre-season friendlies, beating second tier rivals Stoke City 1–0 in the process. They also recorded wins over Newcastle Town (6–1), Brandon (2–1), Spennymoor (3–0), and Kidderminster Harriers (4–0), and drew 2–2 with Walsall and 1–1 with Crewe Alexandra. Having failed to sign Phil Turner, Rudge felt the squad's one weakness was a lack of depth in defence.

The season opened with a 4–2 win over Preston North End on a plastic pitch at Deepdale. David Riley "discussed a transfer" but remained at the club despite being unhappy at starting the season from the bench. A weak defensive performance then cost them at home to Chester City. However, Rudge was happy with the performance of Simon Mills, a midfielder who was learning a new position at right-back. A disciplined performance was enough to win a point away at Bury, with goalkeeper Mark Grew in impressive form. With Atkinson injured and Steve Harper out of form, Rudge tried unsuccessfully to bring in Liverpool's Steve Staunton and Bournemouth's Mark O'Connor on loan. The campaign though kicked into gear with "a stunningly ruthless" 6–1 thrashing of "a by no means inadequate" Cardiff City. They followed this up with a 5–0 mauling of a "dreadful" Chesterfield – Darren Beckford claiming a hat-trick – and moved to the top of the table. They ended September with a 1–0 win over Bristol City, as the Vale defence proved its effectiveness.

Vale opened October with a 3–3 draw with Wolverhampton Wanderers at Molineux; it was an exciting encounter, as Vale's short passing game proved the equal of the dangerous long ball game of "Wolves". Two days later they claimed a 2–0 victory over Huddersfield Town, with Trevor Wood keeping a clean sheet on his debut after Grew was sidelined with a thigh strain. A 2–0 win over injury-stricken Wigan Athletic at Springfield Park was the club's fifth clean sheet in six league games. Rudge meanwhile agreed a £175,000 deal to bring Andy Jones back from Charlton Athletic, but the striker refused the deal. Yet an injury-time goal from Ray Walker was enough to continue the team's fine run, as a solid Bolton Wanderers club were beaten 2–1; despite still suffering from injury, Grew made a series of impressive saves. With goalkeeper Mark Grew out with a thigh strain, Mike Stowell was taken in on loan from Everton. The month ended poorly, as a 3–2 loss to Blackpool at Bloomfield Road was followed by a 3–3 draw with Sheffield United in front of 13,246 fans (the biggest gate for a league game since 1973). The two northern sides exploited Vale's unease at playing with a new goalkeeper, and forced errors from the Vale defence with high-pressure aerial bombardment. On 29 October, Rudge kept the team in the dressing room for 45 minutes at Griffin Park after a poor performance left the distinctly average home side, Brentford, to secure all three points.

Vale were 13 minutes from opening November with a 3–1 home win over Aldershot when the match had to be abandoned due to fog. They instead found a much needed win away at Northampton Town. Rudge attempted to sign one of West Ham United's defensive pair Gary Strodder and Paul Hilton, but found that neither were willing to join the club. Unaffected by this rejection, the "Valiants" beat third-place Swansea City 2–1, though were disappointed to lose Futcher as the striker was sent off for arguing with the linesman. They then disposed of Fulham with a 3–0 win, despite having to play without Futcher. Rudge was made Manager of the Month.

December began with a 1–1 draw at Southend United. Vale battled to an away point despite playing most of the second half with ten men following Atkinson's dismissal. With Atkinson injured, John Jeffers was taken on loan from Liverpool, though David Riley's form kept Jeffers on the bench. On 17 December, Vale overcame Reading 3–0 to hit second in the table. On Boxing day, Vale recorded a 1–0 win at Mansfield Town despite having Ray Walker sent off. They then missed the chance to end the calendar year on top of the table after falling to a 1–0 loss at relegation fodder Gillingham. Before the year was out, Paul Millar was signed from Irish club Portadown for £20,000, but severely damaged his knee ligaments in one of his early training sessions. Gary Ford also picked up an Achilles injury, and Vale's form suffered.

By January Wolves were clear at the top, and Vale were comfortably placed in second. Vale narrowly beat Notts County and Chester City to give themselves some breathing space. On 18 January, Rudge agreed to sign a new two-year contract. However, Vale began to struggle, as Bury and Cardiff City inflicted two straight losses. Yet a back injury forced Bob Hazell into retirement, whilst Ray Walker had trouble with his foot. More bad news came when loyal servant Phil Sproson retired on medical advice after sustaining a bad knee injury. Rudge responded by trying to bolster his defence but was unable to secure Steve Sims, Peter Swan, Simon Morgan, Chris Hemming, or Peter Skipper. Rudge then decided to sign classy defender Dean Glover from Middlesbrough for £200,000 as a replacement for Sproson. This more than quadrupled the club's previous transfer record. Andy Jones also agreed to join the club on loan to boost the club's promotion chances.

On 4 February, a crowd of 16,362 witnessed a goalless home draw with leaders Wolves; débutante Dean Glover was impressive. Rudge then spent £70,000 on Gillingham defender Gary West, as it became clear that Bob Hazell would be out injured for a long time. On 11 February, Vale won their first-ever point in an away match at Huddersfield. Two days later they battled against the elements to record a 3–0 victory over Aldershot in the re-arranged fixture. Rudge tried to re-sign another former Vale favourite on loan, Mark Chamberlain, but was turned down. The good results continued, though, as Vale rounded out the month with a win over Wigan Athletic and a draw with Sheffield United at Bramall Lane.

A Futcher penalty opened March with a win over Blackpool, though Vale also had two goals disallowed. Preston then purchased young reserve team winger Steve Harper, who wanted to "prove himself", for £35,000. Vale played a five-man defence against relegation candidates Aldershot, and came away from the Recreation Ground with a 2–2 draw as Rudge bemoaned "two points thrown away". They returned to winning ways against Brentford, but could only manage a draw at home to Preston. Rudge refused Reading's offer of £250,000 for Dean Glover, but placed Hazell on the transfer list. He did though sign Jeffers permanently for £30,000 after giving up hope of Atkinson returning to fitness. He also re-signed Ronnie Jepson from Nantwich Town, though attempts to loan in Jim Melrose from Shrewsbury Town were unsuccessful. On 25 March, Beckford hit a hat-trick as Vale claimed a 4–1 victory at Notts County to go ten games unbeaten. Two days later though, they fell to defeat at home to Mansfield.

April began with a 3–0 defeat at Reading after the team put in a "woefully inadequate display". They then claimed a draw at promotion rivals Bristol Rovers, though Rudge said that "we deserved to win". They were then fortunate to hang on to second place after making tough work of what should have been a routine home win over Gillingham. Gary Ford was ruled out for the rest of the season as injuries began to take their toll on the squad, though they still managed to return from Chesterfield with another three points. However, they dropped down to third after losing at home to Bristol City. Vale then returned from Bolton with only a point and were forced to contend with another injury as Riley suffered a broken leg. More points were dropped after a goalless draw at home to Swansea, the lack of goals being blamed on poor service from the flanks.

On 1 May, Vale lost at home to Northampton Town after wasting chances to score and making mistakes in defence. A young Andy Porter helped to ensure three victories in the final three games, but it was too late to gain automatic promotion. The regular season concluded with a 2–1 win at Fulham as they came from being a goal down to former loanee striker Michael Cole to win the game with a Kevin Finney strike and Gary West header. Going into the play-offs Rudge said that "We have almost climbed Everest, but there is one small hill to go and the players must be in a positive mood."

They finished in third place with 84 points, missing out on automatic promotion due to Sheffield United's superior goal difference. The team were unfortunate not to win automatic promotion, as the old system of two points for a win would have seen them finish second, and their tally of 84 points would have won them promotion in the Second Division and would have been enough to clinch the Fourth Division title. No team in the division conceded fewer than Vale's 48 goals, and Vale also had the best away record. However, relegated Southend lost fewer home games than the Vale. Ray Walker was selected for the PFA's Third Division Team of the Year for the second season running. However, it was goalkeeper Mark Grew who was voted Port Vale F.C. Player of the Year.

Facing Preston North End in the play-off semi-finals at Deepdale, there was a pitch invasion by fans after a fire erupted under the wooden slats of the stands. Stoke-on-Trent North MP Joan Walley called for an enquiry at Parliament, but no enquiry was made. Vale drew 1–1 at Preston but won 3–1 at home with a Beckford hat-trick in front of 13,416 supporters. In the final, an equalizing goal by Robbie Earle earned Vale a 1–1 draw at Twerton Park, before Earle scored the only goal of the return leg at Vale Park in front of 17,353 fans. Beckford was the season's top-scorer with 23 goals, whilst Futcher and Earle bagged 19 goals.

"In a divided city, Vale supporters are no longer second class citizens and, hopefully, what we have achieved may just be the start. I am very proud to be manager of Port Vale, but it was the players that did the stuff."

— John Rudge put the club on a par with Stoke City for the first time since 1956–57.

=== Finances ===
On the financial side, a loss of £88,142 was made due to a £333,084 debt on player transfers. Match receipts had risen by £258,000 thanks to an average home crowd of 6,731. Home attendances had risen by 78%, and were the highest since 1969–70. The open market rents raised £122,000 and the Developments Fund donations raised £92,000. The wage bill had risen by 30% to £481,859 and the police bill had quadrupled to £55,202 – described by Bill Bell as an 'absolutely crippling' cost. There was no bank overdraft, but debts had risen to £201,434. The club's shirt sponsors were ABC Minolta Copiers.

=== Cup competitions ===
In the FA Cup, Vale progressed past Northern Premier League Southport with a 2–0 victory at Haig Avenue. The television cameras were disappointed not to find a giant-killing, as the non-League side failed to cause the Vale much trouble. They then overcame Bolton Wanderers 2–1 at Burnden Park, after "Trotters" goalkeeper David Felgate proved unable to deal with crosses into the box. Drawn against second-place First Division side Norwich City at Burslem in the third round, they were beaten 3–1 by the "Canaries" in front of 15,697 fans, despite holding the lead for most of the match. The introduction of second-half substitute Robert Fleck changed the match, and he and Andy Townsend got the goals for Norwich.

In the League Cup, a 3–2 home win over Chesterfield and a 1–1 draw at Saltergate were enough to send Vale into the second round against Second Division Ipswich Town. Progress came at a price, though, as new signing Paul Atkinson was sidelined after chipping a bone in his ankle. Vale won the home leg against Ipswich 1–0, as they proved the equal of their Second Division opponents. However, they were knocked out of the competition with a 3–0 defeat at Portman Road, Ipswich's speedy-attacking play proving too much for the Vale to handle in rainy conditions.

In the Associate Members' Cup, a 1–1 home draw with Fourth Division Hereford United and a 5–1 defeat to Wolverhampton Wanderers at Molineux meant the Vale did not progress past the group stage. Vale had dominated Hereford but failed to make the game safe before the "Bulls" found an equaliser with 13 minutes left to play. Steve Bull had proven the Vale's undoing at "Wolves", as he found the net four times.

== Results ==
=== Football League Third Division ===
==== League table ====
Pos	Team	Pld	W	D	L	GF	GA	GD	Pts	Promotion or relegation
1	Wolverhampton Wanderers (C, P)	46	26	14	6	96	49	+47	92	Promotion to the Second Division
2	Sheffield United (P)	46	25	9	12	93	54	+39	84	Promotion to the Second Division
3	Port Vale (O, P)	46	24	12	10	78	48	+30	84	Qualification for the Third Division play-offs
4	Fulham	46	22	9	15	69	67	+2	75	Qualification for the Third Division play-offs
5	Bristol Rovers	46	19	17	10	67	51	+16	74	Qualification for the Third Division play-offs

(C) Champions; (O) Play-off winners; (P) Promoted

==== Results by matchday ====
Round	1	2	3	4	5	6	7	8	9	10	11	12	13	14	15	16	17	18	19	20	21	22	23	24	25	26	27	28	29	30	31	32	33	34	35	36	37	38	39	40	41	42	43	44	45	46
Ground	A	H	A	H	H	A	A	H	A	H	A	H	A	A	H	H	A	H	A	A	H	A	H	A	H	A	H	H	A	H	A	H	H	A	H	A	A	H	A	H	A	A	H	H	H	A
Result	W	L	D	W	W	W	D	W	W	W	L	D	L	W	W	W	D	W	W	L	W	W	L	L	D	D	W	W	D	W	D	W	D	W	L	L	D	W	W	L	D	D	L	W	W	W
Position	1	10	12	5	1	2	2	1	1	1	2	2	3	4	3	3	2	2	2	2	2	2	2	2	2	2	2	2	2	2	2	2	2	2	2	2	2	2	2	3	3	3	3	3	3	3
Points	3	3	4	7	10	13	14	17	20	23	23	24	24	27	30	33	34	37	40	40	43	46	46	46	47	48	51	54	55	58	59	62	63	66	66	66	67	70	73	73	74	75	75	78	81	84

Source: Statto
A = Away; H = Home; W = Win; D = Draw; L = Loss

==== Matches ====
27 August 1988 1	Preston North End	1–3	Port Vale	Preston, Lancashire
		Report	Atkinson (pen.); Beckford	Stadium: Deepdale; Attendance: 6,745

3 September 1988 2	Port Vale	1–2	Chester City	Burslem
	Futcher	Report	Woodthorpe; Johnson	Stadium: Vale Park; Attendance: 4,213

10 September 1988 3	Bury	0–0	Port Vale	Bury, Greater Manchester
		Report		Stadium: Gigg Lane; Attendance: 2,978

17 September 1988 4	Port Vale	6–1	Cardiff City	Burslem
	Futcher; Beckford; Riley; Earle; Walker	Report	Gilligan	Stadium: Vale Park; Attendance: 4,280

19 September 1988 5	Port Vale	5–0	Chesterfield	Burslem
	Beckford; Ford	Report		Stadium: Vale Park; Attendance: 4,469

24 September 1988 6	Bristol City	0–1	Port Vale	Ashton Gate, Bristol
		Report	Walker	Stadium: Ashton Gate; Attendance: 7,235

1 October 1988 7	Wolverhampton Wanderers	3–3	Port Vale	Wolverhampton
		Report	Earle; Futcher; Sproson	Stadium: Molineux Stadium; Attendance: 14,018

3 October 1988 8	Port Vale	2–0	Huddersfield Town	Burslem
	Ford; Futcher	Report		Stadium: Vale Park; Attendance: 5,938

8 October 1988 9	Wigan Athletic	0–2	Port Vale	Wigan
		Report	Earle; Beckford	Stadium: Springfield Park; Attendance: 3,976

15 October 1988 10	Port Vale	2–1	Bolton Wanderers	Burslem
	Riley; Walker	Report	Brookman	Stadium: Vale Park; Attendance: 7,985

22 October 1988 11	Blackpool	3–2	Port Vale	Blackpool
		Report	Futcher	Stadium: Bloomfield Road; Attendance: 7,045

24 October 1988 12	Port Vale	3–3	Sheffield United	Burslem
	Ford; Futcher (pen.)	Report		Stadium: Vale Park; Attendance: 13,246

29 October 1988 13	Brentford	2–1	Port Vale	Brentford, West London
	Jones; Holdsworth	Report	Earle	Stadium: Griffin Park; Attendance: 5,212

8 November 1988 14	Northampton Town	1–3	Port Vale	Northampton
19:30 GMT	Culpin	Report	Beckford; Earle; Futcher	Stadium: County Cricket Ground; Attendance: 3,796; Referee: Jim Borritt

12 November 1988 15	Port Vale	2–1	Swansea City	Burslem
	Futcher; Beckford	Report		Stadium: Vale Park; Attendance: 6,248

26 November 1988 16	Port Vale	3–0	Fulham	Burslem
	Beckford; Atkinson (pen.)	Report		Stadium: Vale Park; Attendance: 5,097

2 December 1988 17	Southend United	1–1	Port Vale	Southend-on-Sea
		Report	Sproson	Stadium: Roots Hall; Attendance: 3,245

17 December 1988 18	Port Vale	3–0	Reading	Burslem
	(og.); Beckford; Riley	Report		Stadium: Vale Park; Attendance: 4,779

26 December 1988 19	Mansfield Town	0–1	Port Vale	Mansfield
		Report	Earle	Stadium: Field Mill; Attendance: 5,224

30 December 1988 20	Gillingham	1–0	Port Vale	Gillingham, Kent
	Cooper	Report		Stadium: Priestfield Stadium; Attendance: 4,593

2 January 1989 21	Port Vale	1–0	Notts County	Burslem
	Beckford	Report		Stadium: Vale Park; Attendance: 7,084

14 January 1989 22	Chester City	1–2	Port Vale	Chester
	Dale	Report	Earle; Beckford	Stadium: Sealand Road; Attendance: 4,899

21 January 1989 23	Port Vale	1–3	Bury	Burslem
	Futcher	Report		Stadium: Vale Park; Attendance: 5,783

28 January 1989 24	Cardiff City	3–0	Port Vale	Cardiff
15:00 GMT	Jimmy Gilligan 45', 49'; Bartlett 47'	Report		Stadium: Ninian Park; Attendance: 4,507; Referee: Roger Wiseman

4 February 1989 25	Port Vale	0–0	Wolverhampton Wanderers	Burslem
		Report		Stadium: Vale Park; Attendance: 16,362

11 February 1989 26	Huddersfield Town	0–0	Port Vale	Huddersfield
		Report		Stadium: Leeds Road; Attendance: 8,004

13 February 1989 27	Port Vale	3–0	Aldershot	Burslem
	Beckford; Jones	Report		Stadium: Vale Park; Attendance: 5,033

18 February 1989 28	Port Vale	2–1	Wigan Athletic	Burslem
	Earle; Futcher	Report	Griffiths	Stadium: Vale Park; Attendance: 6,100

28 February 1989 29	Sheffield United	0–0	Port Vale	Sheffield
		Report		Stadium: Bramall Lane; Attendance: 18,787

4 March 1989 30	Port Vale	1–0	Blackpool	Burslem
	Futcher (pen.)	Report		Stadium: Vale Park; Attendance: 6,306

11 March 1989 31	Aldershot	2–2	Port Vale	Aldershot
		Report	Futcher (pen.); Earle	Stadium: Recreation Ground; Attendance: 2,397

13 March 1989 32	Port Vale	3–2	Brentford	Burslem
	Futcher; Ford; Jones	Report	Godfrey; Millen	Stadium: Vale Park; Attendance: 5,577

18 March 1989 33	Port Vale	1–1	Preston North End	Burslem
	Ford	Report		Stadium: Vale Park; Attendance: 8,584

25 March 1989 34	Notts County	1–4	Port Vale	Nottingham
		Report	Beckford (pen.); Walker	Stadium: Meadow Lane; Attendance: 7,328

27 March 1989 35	Port Vale	1–2	Mansfield Town	Burslem
	Earle	Report	Owen; Coleman	Stadium: Vale Park; Attendance: 8,198

1 April 1989 36	Reading	3–0	Port Vale	Reading, Berkshire
		Report		Stadium: Elm Park; Attendance: 4,501

5 April 1989 37	Bristol Rovers	2–2	Port Vale	Bath, Somerset
		Report	Jones; Earle	Stadium: Twerton Park; Attendance: 6,869

8 April 1989 38	Port Vale	2–1	Gillingham	Burslem
	(og.); Walker	Report	Lovell	Stadium: Vale Park; Attendance: 5,358

15 April 1989 39	Chesterfield	1–2	Port Vale	Chesterfield, Derbyshire
		Report	Beckford	Stadium: Saltergate; Attendance: 5,953

21 April 1989 40	Port Vale	0–1	Bristol City	Burslem
		Report		Stadium: Vale Park; Attendance: 6,923

25 April 1989 41	Bolton Wanderers	1–1	Port Vale	Bolton
	Chandler	Report	Earle	Stadium: Burnden Park; Attendance: 5,296

29 April 1989 42	Swansea City	0–0	Port Vale	Swansea
		Report		Stadium: Vetch Field; Attendance: 4,229

1 May 1989 43	Port Vale	1–2	Northampton Town	Burslem
15:00 BST	Futcher	Report	Culpin; Thomas	Stadium: Vale Park; Attendance: 6,604

6 May 1989 44	Port Vale	2–0	Southend United	Burslem
	Futcher; Porter	Report		Stadium: Vale Park; Attendance: 4,516

9 May 1989 45	Port Vale	1–0	Bristol Rovers	Burslem
	Earle	Report		Stadium: Vale Park; Attendance: 6,136

13 May 1989 46	Fulham	1–2	Port Vale	Fulham, West London
		Report	Finney; West	Stadium: Craven Cottage; Attendance: 6,257

=== Third Division play-offs ===
22 May 1989 Semi-final 1st Leg	Preston North End	1–1	Port Vale	Preston, Lancashire
		Report	Earle	Stadium: Deepdale; Attendance: 14,280

25 May 1989 Semi-final 2nd Leg	Port Vale	3–1	Preston North End	Burslem
	Beckford	Report		Stadium: Vale Park; Attendance: 13,416

31 May 1989 Final 1st Leg	Bristol Rovers	1–1	Port Vale	Bath, Somerset
19:45 BST	Penrice 31'	Report	Earle 73'	Stadium: Twerton Park; Attendance: 9,042; Referee: Allan Gunn

3 June 1989 Final 2nd Leg	Port Vale	1–0	Bristol Rovers	Burslem
15:00 BST	Earle 52'	Report		Stadium: Vale Park; Attendance: 17,353; Referee: Keith Hackett

=== FA Cup ===
19 November 1988 R1	Southport	0–2	Port Vale	Southport
		Report	Sproson; Riley	Stadium: Haig Avenue; Attendance: 3,434

10 December 1988 R2	Bolton Wanderers	1–2	Port Vale	Bolton
		Report	Futcher; Earle	Stadium: Burnden Park; Attendance: 7,499

8 January 1989 R3	Port Vale	1–3	Norwich City	Burslem
	Webb	Report	Townsend; Fleck	Stadium: Vale Park; Attendance: 15,697

=== League Cup ===
30 August 1988 R1 1st Leg	Port Vale	3–2	Chesterfield	Burslem
	Futcher (pen.); Sproson; Earle	Report		Stadium: Vale Park; Attendance: 3,492

6 September 1988 R1 2nd Leg	Chesterfield	1–1 (3–4 agg.)	Port Vale	Chesterfield, Derbyshire
		Report	Earle	Stadium: Saltergate; Attendance: 2,709

26 September 1988 R2 1st Leg	Port Vale	1–0	Ipswich Town	Burslem
	Sproson	Report		Stadium: Vale Park; Attendance: 6,545

11 October 1988 R2 2nd Leg	Ipswich Town	3–0 (3–1 agg.)	Port Vale	Ipswich
		Report		Stadium: Portman Road; Attendance: 9,065

=== Associate Members' Cup ===
21 November 1988 Preliminary	Port Vale	1–1	Hereford United	Burslem
	Walker	Report		Stadium: Vale Park; Attendance: 1,893

13 December 1988 Preliminary	Wolverhampton Wanderers	5–1 (6–2 agg.)	Port Vale	Wolverhampton
		Report	Ford	Stadium: Molineux Stadium; Attendance: 9,734

== Squad statistics ==
=== Appearances and goals ===
Key to positions: GK – Goalkeeper; DF – Defender; MF – Midfielder; FW – Forward

No.	Pos	Nat	Player	Total		Third Division		FA Cup		League Cup		Associate Members' Cup	
No.	Pos	Nat	Player	Apps	Goals	Apps	Goals	Apps	Goals	Apps	Goals	Apps	Goals
	GK	(England) ENG	Mark Grew	49	0	37	0	3	0	4	0	5	0
	GK	(Northern Ireland) NIR	Trevor Wood	2	0	2	0	0	0	0	0	0	0
	DF	(England) ENG	Dean Glover	26	0	22	0	0	0	0	0	4	0
	DF	(England) ENG	Bob Hazell	24	0	17	0	3	0	2	0	2	0
	DF	(England) ENG	Darren Hughes	56	0	44	0	3	0	3	0	6	0
	DF	(England) ENG	Joe McIntyre	0	0	0	0	0	0	0	0	0	0
	DF	(England) ENG	Simon Mills	55	0	43	0	3	0	3	0	6	0
	DF	(England) ENG	Wayne Simpson	0	0	0	0	0	0	0	0	0	0
	DF	(England) ENG	Alan Webb	47	1	37	0	3	1	4	0	3	0
	DF	(England) ENG	Gary West	17	1	14	1	0	0	0	0	3	0
	MF	(England) ENG	Paul Atkinson	6	3	4	3	0	0	1	0	1	0
	MF	(England) ENG	Steve Davies	0	0	0	0	0	0	0	0	0	0
	MF	(Jamaica) JAM	Robbie Earle	57	19	44	13	3	1	4	2	6	3
	MF	(England) ENG	Kevin Finney	17	1	14	1	0	0	2	0	1	0
	MF	(England) ENG	Gary Ford	28	8	22	7	1	0	4	0	1	1
	MF	(England) ENG	John Jeffers	20	0	15	0	0	0	0	0	5	0
	MF	(England) ENG	Andy Porter	18	1	14	1	0	0	0	0	4	0
	MF	(England) ENG	Ray Walker	56	6	43	5	3	0	4	0	6	1
	FW	(England) ENG	Darren Beckford	55	23	42	20	3	0	4	0	6	3
	FW	(England) ENG	Ron Futcher	54	19	41	17	3	1	4	1	6	0
	FW	(England) ENG	Ronnie Jepson	2	0	2	0	0	0	0	0	0	0
	FW	(Wales) WAL	Andy Jones	17	3	17	3	0	0	0	0	0	0
	FW	(England) ENG	Simon Lomax	0	0	0	0	0	0	0	0	0	0
	FW	(Northern Ireland) NIR	Paul Millar	0	0	0	0	0	0	0	0	0	0
	FW	(England) ENG	David Riley	48	4	40	3	3	1	3	0	2	0
Players who featured but departed the club during the season:
	GK	(England) ENG	Mike Stowell	8	0	7	0	0	0	0	0	1	0
	DF	(England) ENG	Phil Sproson	29	5	20	2	3	1	4	2	2	0
	MF	(England) ENG	Steve Harper	8	0	7	0	0	0	1	0	0	0

=== Top scorers ===
Place	Position	Nation	Name	Third Division	Play-offs	FA Cup	League Cup	Associate Members' Cup	Total
1	FW	England	Darren Beckford	20	3	0	0	0	23
2	FW	England	Ron Futcher	17	0	1	1	0	19
–	MF	Jamaica	Robbie Earle	13	3	1	2	0	19
4	MF	England	Gary Ford	7	0	0	0	1	8
5	MF	England	Ray Walker	5	0	0	0	1	6
6	DF	England	Phil Sproson	2	0	1	2	0	5
7	FW	England	David Riley	3	0	1	0	0	4
8	FW	England	Andy Jones	3	0	0	0	0	3
–	MF	England	Paul Atkinson	3	0	0	0	0	3
10	DF	England	Gary West	1	0	0	0	0	1
–	MF	England	Andy Porter	1	0	0	0	0	1
–	MF	England	Kevin Finney	1	0	0	0	0	1
–	DF	England	Alan Webb	0	0	1	0	0	1
–		–	Own goals	2	0	0	0	0	2
			TOTALS	78	6	5	5	2	96

== Transfers ==
=== Transfers in ===
Date from	Position	Nationality	Name	From	Fee	Ref.
May 1988	GK	NIR	Trevor Wood	Brighton & Hove Albion	Free transfer	
21 June 1988	MF	ENG	Paul Atkinson	Sunderland	£20,000	
5 August 1988	FW	ENG	Ron Futcher	Bradford City	£35,000	
29 December 1988	FW	NIR	Paul Millar	(Northern Ireland) Portadown	£20,000	
3 February 1989	DF	ENG	Dean Glover	Middlesbrough	£200,000	
13 February 1989	DF	ENG	Gary West	Gillingham	£70,000	
23 March 1989	MF	ENG	John Jeffers	Liverpool	£30,000	
March 1989	FW	ENG	Ronnie Jepson	Nantwich Town	Free transfer	

=== Transfers out ===
Date from	Position	Nationality	Name	To	Fee	Ref.
February 1989	DF	ENG	Phil Sproson	Birmingham City	Retired	
23 March 1989	MF	ENG	Steve Harper	Preston North End	£35,000	
June 1989	DF	ENG	Bob Hazell		Released	
July 1989	MF	ENG	Steve Davies	Altrincham	Free transfer	

=== Loans in ===
Date from	Position	Nationality	Name	From	Date to	Ref.
October 1988	GK	ENG	Mike Stowell	Everton	14 December 1988	
11 December 1988	MF	ENG	John Jeffers	Liverpool	3 February 1989	
2 February 1989	FW	WAL	Andy Jones	Charlton Athletic	End of season	

=== Loans out ===
Date from	Position	Nationality	Name	To	Date to	Ref.
January 1989	MF	ENG	Paul Atkinson	Stafford Rangers	January 1989	
February 1989	MF	ENG	Steve Davies	Northwich Victoria	April 1989	
