= Steve Davies (footballer, born 1960) =

English footballer

Stephen Davies
Personal information
- Full name: Stephen Easmon Davies
- Date of birth: 16 July 1960 (age 66)
- Place of birth: Liverpool, England
- Height: 6 ft 0 in (1.83 m)
- Positions: Midfielder; striker

Youth career
- Congleton Town

Senior career*
Years	Team	Apps	(Gls)
1987–1989	Port Vale	6	(0)
1989	→ Northwich Victoria (loan)		
- Altrincham
- South Liverpool
- * Club domestic league appearances and goals

Stephen Easmon Davies (born 16 July 1960) is an English former footballer who played as a midfielder for Congleton Town, Port Vale, Northwich Victoria, Altrincham, and South Liverpool. His son is rugby international Marcus Holden.

== Career ==
Davies played for Congleton Town (North West Counties League), before joining John Rudge's Port Vale in December 1987. He came on as a substitute five times and started one game, in the 1987–88 Third Division campaign. He did not feature at Vale Park in the 1988–89 season, and was instead loaned out to Conference club Northwich Victoria in a three-month deal in February 1989. His contract with the "Valiants" was cancelled in July 1989, at which point he moved on to Altrincham (Conference) and then South Liverpool (Northern Premier League).

== Career statistics ==
Appearances and goals by club, season and competition
Club	Season	League			FA Cup		Other		Total	
Club	Season	Division	Apps	Goals	Apps	Goals	Apps	Goals	Apps	Goals
Port Vale	1987–88	Third Division	6	0	0	0	0	0	6	0
Port Vale	1988–89	Third Division	0	0	0	0	0	0	0	0
Port Vale	Total		6	0	0	0	0	0	6	0
