= 1992–93 Port Vale F.C. season =

Port Vale F.C.
1992–93 season
- Chairman: Bill Bell
- Manager: John Rudge
- Stadium: Vale Park
- Football League Second Division: 3rd (89 points) play-off runners-up (eliminated by West Bromwich Albion)
- FA Cup: Third Round (eliminated by Newcastle United)
- League Cup: First Round (eliminated by Bolton Wanderers)
- Football League Trophy: Winners
- TNT Tournament: Winners
- Player of the Year: Ian Taylor
- Top goalscorer: League: Ian Taylor (15); All: Ian Taylor (19)
- Highest home attendance: 20,373 vs. Stoke City, 31 March 1993
- Lowest home attendance: 3,851 vs. Fulham, 12 January 1993
- Average home league attendance: 8,092
- Biggest win: 4–0 (twice)
- Biggest defeat: 0–4 vs. Newcastle United, 2 January 1993
Home colours	Away colours

The 1992–93 season was Port Vale's 81st season of football in the English Football League, and fourth successive (36th overall) season in the Second Division. Under manager John Rudge and chairman Bill Bell, the club introduced key signings Ian Taylor and Paul Musselwhite for a combined fee of just £40,000, both of whom would prove pivotal. Vale won the pre‑season TNT Tournament and triumphed in the Football League Trophy, defeating Stockport County 2–1 in the final at Wembley. In the league, Vale secured third place with 89 points, narrowly missing out on automatic promotion to uphill rivals Stoke City and Bolton Wanderers, and subsequently lost the play‑off final 3–0 to West Bromwich Albion.

Cup runs outside the Football League Trophy were modest — they exited the FA Cup in the Third Round and the League Cup in the First Round. Vale played five fiercely contested Potteries derby fixtures — winning the Football League Trophy and the FA Cup ties (after a replay), though losing both league encounters.

Ian Taylor was the club's Player of the Year and leading goalscorer, netting 15 in the league and 19 across all competitions. The highest attendance at Vale Park was 20,373 for the match against Stoke City on 31 March 1993, while the lowest was 3,851 against Fulham on 12 January 1993; the average league attendance was 8,092. Vale recorded two biggest wins of 4–0, and endured their heaviest defeat of 4–0 to Newcastle United on 2 January 1993.

Vale's season was positively marked by a trophy win and encouraging individual performances from Taylor and Musselwhite but they failed to achieve promotion at Wembley.

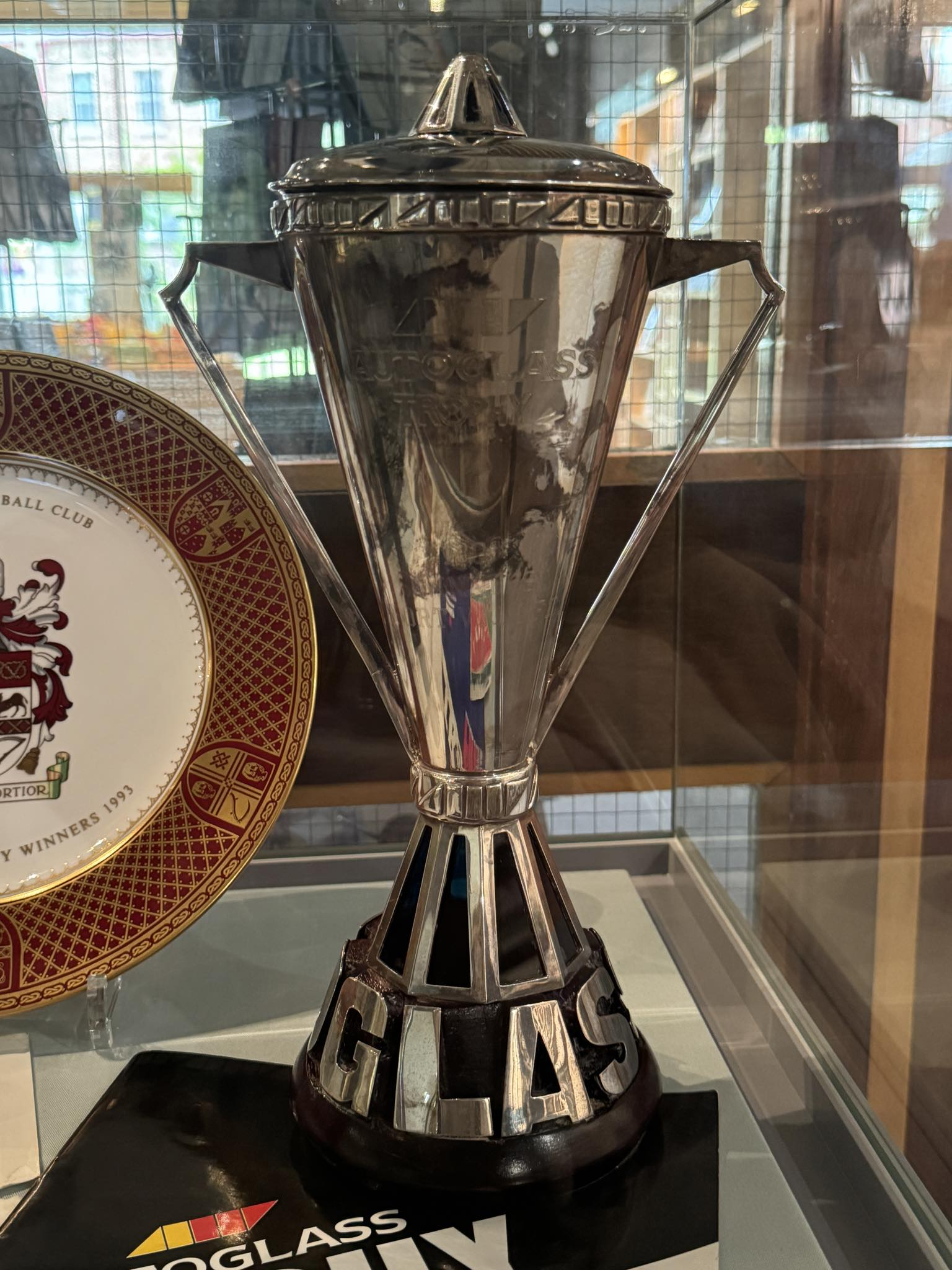
The Football League Trophy

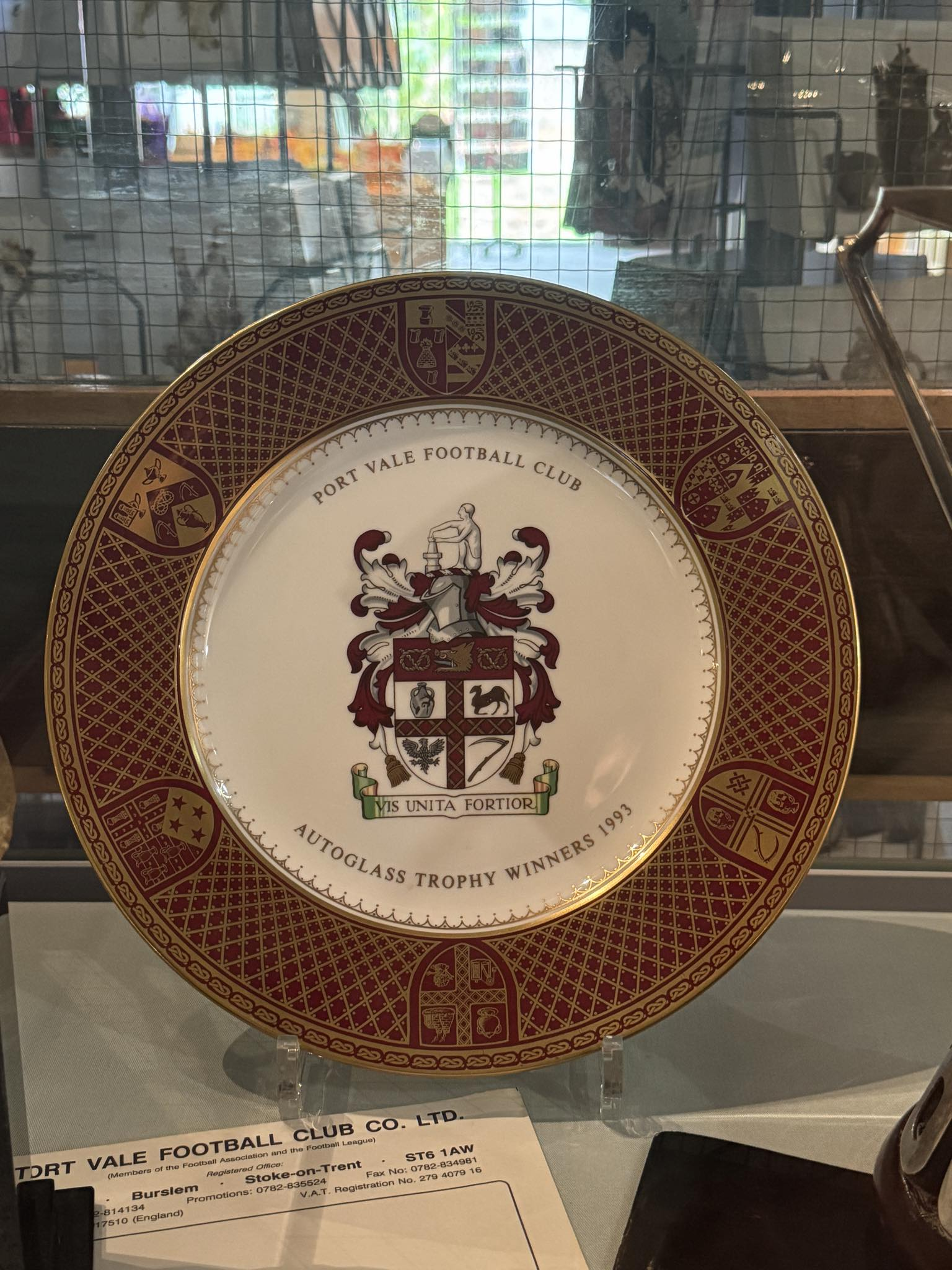
Football League Trophy victory commemoration plate

== Overview ==
=== Second Division ===
The pre-season saw Vale tour the Netherlands and participate in a TNT Tournament. Beating De Graafschap 5–0, van der Laan scoring a brace, they then lost 4–3 to the Go Ahead Eagles on penalties, following a goalless draw. Despite this, they were crowned the tournament's winners on aggregate. John Rudge uncovered another 'gem' by signing midfielder Ian Taylor from non-League side Moor Green for a fee of just £15,000. He also spent a mere £25,000 to bring Scunthorpe United goalkeeper Paul Musselwhite to Vale Park. Musslewhite's arrival came due to the departure of Mark Grew to Cardiff City. Paul Kerr also arrived in Burslem from Millwall for a £140,000 fee. Another new face was defender Bradley Sandeman, who arrived on a free transfer from Maidstone United.

The season started poorly, with the Vale picking up just one win in the opening eight games. On 5 September, Trevor Wood conceded a penalty at Vetch Field in an 'off the ball' incident with a Swansea player and was subsequently dropped in favour of Musselwhite, who remained an ever-present in the Vale side for the rest of the season. On 17 October, Vale won 4–0 at home to Plymouth Argyle. From 12 September to 13 February, they went on a club-record streak of 22 games without failing to score – losing just two games in the process (one of these being a 2–1 defeat to Stoke City at the Victoria Ground). Overlapping this spell, from 1 January to 14 March, they went on a club-record six straight home defeats. This was followed by two further club records, as between 20 March and 24 April, they made five consecutive away wins, picking up clean sheets in all five games. The first encounter with Stoke came in the league at the Victoria Ground on 24 October, when Mark Stein converted a controversial penalty he had won following a foul by Musselwhite to give the home side a 2–1 win. Mark Stein described an "electric" atmosphere, saying the hissing sound from the ground "was like something I had never known, I'd had derbies before for Luton against Watford, but Stoke–Vale was something different". On 12 December, Vale recorded a 5–2 win away at Preston North End despite opposition manager John Beck having the ball boys emopty buckets of sand on to the corners of the Deepdale plastic pitch to hold the ball up. It was Vale's biggest win in five years, with Nicky Cross beginning the scoring after 36 seconds, and Robin van der Laan putting the team ahead again one minute into the second half.

In January, Dean Stokes was signed from non-League Halesowen Town for £5,000. The next month Peter Billing arrived on loan from Coventry City, and impressed enough to earn a permanent move three months later, at a fee of £35,000. Alex Mathie also arrived on loan from Greenock Morton, but failed to make an impact. Six straight league wins in the new year were followed by losses on the road at Stockport County and Rotherham United. In the driving snow, they returned to winning ways with a 2–1 home win over promotion rivals West Bromwich Albion. On 6 March, Vale recorded a 2–0 win at Brighton & Hove Albion with Peter Swan filling in at centre-forward in the absence of Martin Foyle; the goals came from a Dean Glover free-kick and Kevin Kent – his first goal for the club.

The return league Potteries derby fixture was held at Vale Park on 31 March, with 20,373 fans turning out to see if the Vale could close the seven-point gap on league leaders Stoke City, who would virtually seal promotion with an away victory. Stein opened the scoring with a volley on five minutes and Nigel Gleghorn headed in a corner kick on 64 minutes to seal a league double for the Potters over their city rivals. On 10 April, Vale secured a 1–0 victory at Mansfield Town despite Walker, Taylor, Jeffers and Slaven all being absent due to injury. They won four of their final five games, but this was not enough to gain them a promotion place, as Bolton won 15 of their final 18 games.

They finished in third place with 89 points, one point short of promoted Bolton Wanderers and four points behind rivals Stoke City. Their two draws with Bolton and two defeats to Stoke proved fatal. They were a massive 17 points clear of seventh place Leyton Orient, and so went into the play-offs. Facing the foes of their Football League Trophy final success, Stockport County, in the semi-finals, Vale drew 1–1 at Edgeley Park thanks to a Glover goal. They won the return leg in front of 12,689 fans with a Martin Foyle goal. In the final were the side that had knocked them out of the FA Cup semi-finals in 1954, West Bromwich Albion. The game was goalless until Peter Swan was dismissed for bringing down an advancing Bob Taylor. They tasted defeat at Wembley for the first time as a crowd of 53,471 witnessed three subsequent West Brom goals, scored by Andy Hunt, Nicky Reid, and Kevin Donovan.

Player of the Year Ian Taylor, top-scorer with 19 goals, was also picked for the PFA Second Division Team of the Year.

=== Finances ===
The club's shirt sponsors were Tunstall Assurance. Chairman Bill Bell claimed that the FA Cup victory at Altrincham did not win the club enough profit to pay the players' win bonuses and that the Newcastle game only secured £50,000 profit, saying the £150,000 profit from the Stoke game was enough to match £120,000 a year losses the club were making due to sliding attendances.

=== Cup competitions ===
In the FA Cup, Vale were drawn against Stoke City. After a goalless draw at the Victoria Ground, some 19,810 turned up to see the replay at Vale Park. A 3–1 victory followed, with a Foyle brace and a third from Andy Porter; the game was best remembered for a patch of mud however, which stopped a certain goal from Dave Regis which would have levelled the score at 2–2. The "Valiants" then easily dispatched non-league Altrincham with a 4–1 win at Moss Lane. Drawn against First Division Newcastle United at St James' Park in the third round, Vale were brushed aside 4–0 by the "Magpies".

In the League Cup, Vale faced a tricky encounter with league rivals Bolton Wanderers. Losing 2–1 at Burnden Park, a 1–1 draw in Burslem meant the "Trotters" advanced at the expense of the Vale.

In the Football League Trophy, Vale overcame Fulham with a 4–3 victory, despite going behind in extra time, Glover bagging a brace. They then faced Third Division Northampton Town, who they dispatched with a 4–2 win. Facing Stoke City once again in the Southern Section semi-finals, Robin van der Laan scored the only goal of the game at the Victoria Ground to take Vale into the Southern Area final. They then had to face Exeter City over two legs and won the home tie by two goals to one, after which Exeter manager Alan Ball said he was "absolutely delighted that we go into the next game only one down". A 1–1 draw at St James Park followed, with Slaven scoring the crucial third goal of the aggregate tie with 13 minutes left to play. The league was the priority. Yet, Vale had made it into the Football League Trophy final. Stockport County were out for revenge after Vale had edged them out of the play-offs. Paul Kerr put the Vale ahead, before Bernie Slaven made it two before half-time. Giant striker Kevin Francis pulled one back, but Vale held on for the win.

== Results ==
=== Football League Second Division ===
==== League table ====
Pos	Team	Pld	W	D	L	GF	GA	GD	Pts	Qualification or relegation
1	Stoke City (C, P)	46	27	12	7	73	34	+39	93	Promotion to the First Division
2	Bolton Wanderers (P)	46	27	9	10	80	41	+39	90	Promotion to the First Division
3	Port Vale	46	26	11	9	79	44	+35	89	Qualification for the Second Division play-offs
4	West Bromwich Albion (O, P)	46	25	10	11	88	54	+34	85	Qualification for the Second Division play-offs
5	Swansea City	46	20	13	13	65	47	+18	73	Qualification for the Second Division play-offs

Rules for classification: 1) Points; 2) Goals scored; 3) Goal difference
(C) Champions; (O) Play-off winners; (P) Promoted

==== Results by matchday ====
Round	1	2	3	4	5	6	7	8	9	10	11	12	13	14	15	16	17	18	19	20	21	22	23	24	25	26	27	28	29	30	31	32	33	34	35	36	37	38	39	40	41	42	43	44	45	46
Ground	H	A	H	H	A	H	A	A	H	H	A	H	A	H	H	A	H	A	A	H	A	H	A	H	A	H	H	A	A	H	A	A	H	A	H	A	H	H	H	A	H	A	A	H	A	A
Result	D	L	D	W	L	D	D	D	W	W	W	W	L	W	W	D	D	W	W	D	L	W	W	W	W	W	W	L	L	W	W	L	D	W	W	W	L	W	D	W	L	W	W	W	D	W
Position	13	20	19	11	14	15	16	17	14	13	12	8	9	9	5	5	7	6	3	3	7	5	4	4	4	2	2	2	2	2	2	2	2	2	2	2	2	2	2	2	2	2	2	2	3	3
Points	1	1	2	5	5	6	7	8	11	14	17	20	20	23	26	27	28	31	34	35	35	38	41	44	47	50	53	53	53	56	59	59	60	63	66	69	69	72	73	76	76	79	82	85	86	89

Source: Statto
A = Away; H = Home; W = Win; D = Draw; L = Loss

==== Matches ====
15 August 1992 1	Port Vale	0–0	Fulham	Burslem
		Report		Stadium: Vale Park; Attendance: 6,746

22 August 1992 2	AFC Bournemouth	2–1	Port Vale	Bournemouth
		Report	Taylor	Stadium: Dean Court; Attendance: 4,825

29 August 1992 3	Port Vale	0–0	Stockport County	Burslem
15:00 BST		Report		Stadium: Vale Park; Attendance: 6,340; Referee: Keith Cooper

1 September 1992 4	Port Vale	4–2	Rotherham United	Burslem
	Taylor; Jeffers; Swan van der Laan	Report		Stadium: Vale Park; Attendance: 5,370

5 September 1992 5	Swansea City	2–0	Port Vale	Swansea
		Report		Stadium: Vetch Field; Attendance: 3,868

12 September 1992 6	Port Vale	2–2	Exeter City	Burslem
	Taylor (og.)	Report		Stadium: Vale Park; Attendance: 5,642; Referee: Gurnam Singh

15 September 1992 7	Burnley	1–1	Port Vale	Burnley
	Monington	Report	Houchen	Stadium: Turf Moor; Attendance: 8,551

19 September 1992 8	Hartlepool United	1–1	Port Vale	Hartlepool
	Olsson 3'	Report	Walker 78' (pen.)	Stadium: Victoria Park; Attendance: 2,815; Referee: TE West

26 September 1992 9	Port Vale	2–0	Chester City	Burslem
	Bartlett; Walker	Report		Stadium: Vale Park; Attendance: 6,392

3 October 1992 10	Port Vale	3–1	Brighton & Hove Albion	Burslem
	Cross; Walker (pen.); Houchen	Report		Stadium: Vale Park; Attendance: 5,731

10 October 1992 11	West Bromwich Albion	0–1	Port Vale	West Bromwich
		Report	Taylor	Stadium: The Hawthorns; Attendance: 17,512

17 October 1992 12	Port Vale	4–0	Plymouth Argyle	Burslem
	Sandeman; Glover; Taylor; Houchen	Report		Stadium: Vale Park; Attendance: 6,584

24 October 1992 13	Stoke City	2–1	Port Vale	Stoke-upon-Trent
	Cranson; Stein	Report	Kerr	Stadium: Victoria Ground; Attendance: 24,334

31 October 1992 14	Port Vale	2–1	Blackpool	Burslem
	Taylor; Walker	Report		Stadium: Vale Park; Attendance: 7,057

3 November 1992 15	Port Vale	2–0	Leyton Orient	Burslem
	Taylor; Kerr	Report		Stadium: Vale Park; Attendance: 7,357

7 November 1992 16	Bolton Wanderers	1–1	Port Vale	Bolton
	McGinlay	Report	(og.)	Stadium: Burnden Park; Attendance: 7,349

21 November 1992 17	Port Vale	1–1	Hull City	Burslem
15:00 GMT	Taylor	Report	Carruthers 29'	Stadium: Vale Park; Attendance: 6,202

28 November 1992 18	Huddersfield Town	1–2	Port Vale	Huddersfield
	Robinson	Report	Swan; Foyle	Stadium: Leeds Road; Attendance: 5,822

12 December 1992 19	Preston North End	2–5	Port Vale	Preston, Lancashire
		Report	Cross van der Laan; Taylor; Porter; Foyle	Stadium: Deepdale; Attendance: 6,038

19 December 1992 20	Port Vale	2–2	Wigan Athletic	Burslem
	Walker van der Laan	Report	Pilling; Griffiths	Stadium: Vale Park; Attendance: 6,647

28 December 1992 21	Bradford City	3–2	Port Vale	Bradford
		Report	Glover; Taylor	Stadium: Valley Parade; Attendance: 8,018

9 January 1993 22	Port Vale	3–0	Burnley	Burslem
	Taylor; Cross; Swan	Report		Stadium: Vale Park; Attendance: 8,815

16 January 1993 23	Chester City	1–2	Port Vale	Chester
	Pugh	Report	Foyle; Kerr	Stadium: Deva Stadium; Attendance: 4,367

30 January 1993 24	Port Vale	3–0	AFC Bournemouth	Burslem
	Cross; Houchen	Report		Stadium: Vale Park; Attendance: 6,834

6 February 1993 25	Fulham	1–2	Port Vale	Fulham, West London
		Report	Taylor; Kerr	Stadium: Craven Cottage; Attendance: 4,905

9 February 1993 26	Port Vale	2–0	Hartlepool United	Burslem
	Taylor 54'; Jeffers 90'	Report		Stadium: Vale Park; Attendance: 6,629; Referee: Tom Fitzharris

13 February 1993 27	Port Vale	2–0	Swansea City	Burslem
	Cross; Houchen	Report		Stadium: Vale Park; Attendance: 7,191

16 February 1993 28	Stockport County	2–0	Port Vale	Stockport
19:30 GMT	Preece 36'; Beaumont 62'	Report		Stadium: Edgeley Park; Attendance: 7,449; Referee: Mike Peck

20 February 1993 29	Rotherham United	4–1	Port Vale	Rotherham
		Report	Sulley	Stadium: Millmoor; Attendance: 5,546

27 February 1993 30	Port Vale	2–1	West Bromwich Albion	Burslem
	Cross; Foyle	Report	Hamilton	Stadium: Vale Park; Attendance: 13,291

6 March 1993 31	Brighton & Hove Albion	0–2	Port Vale	Hove
		Report	Glover; Kent	Stadium: Goldstone Ground; Attendance: 7,294

10 March 1993 32	Reading	1–0	Port Vale	Reading, Berkshire
	Hopkins	Report		Stadium: Elm Park; Attendance: 4,873

13 March 1993 33	Port Vale	0–0	Bolton Wanderers	Burslem
		Report		Stadium: Vale Park; Attendance: 11,055

20 March 1993 34	Leyton Orient	0–1	Port Vale	Leyton, East London
		Report	Walker	Stadium: Brisbane Road; Attendance: 5,950

23 March 1993 35	Port Vale	1–0	Huddersfield Town	Burslem
	van der Laan	Report		Stadium: Vale Park; Attendance: 7,747

27 March 1993 36	Hull City	0–1	Port Vale	Kingston upon Hull
15:00 BST		Report	Walker	Stadium: Boothferry Park; Attendance: 4,558

31 March 1993 37	Port Vale	0–2	Stoke City	Burslem
		Report	Stein; Gleghorn	Stadium: Vale Park; Attendance: 20,373

3 April 1993 38	Port Vale	3–1	Reading	Burslem
	Houchen; Cross; Walker (pen.)	Report	Quinn	Stadium: Vale Park; Attendance: 7,099

6 April 1993 39	Port Vale	2–2	Preston North End	Burslem
	Cross; Kerr	Report		Stadium: Vale Park; Attendance: 8,271

10 April 1993 40	Mansfield Town	0–1	Port Vale	Mansfield
		Report	Kerr	Stadium: Field Mill; Attendance: 5,081

13 April 1993 41	Port Vale	1–2	Bradford City	Burslem
	Cross	Report		Stadium: Vale Park; Attendance: 8,743

17 April 1993 42	Wigan Athletic	0–4	Port Vale	Wigan
		Report	Slaven; Kerr (pen.) van der Laan; Cross	Stadium: Springfield Park; Attendance: 3,743

24 April 1993 43	Plymouth Argyle	0–1	Port Vale	Plymouth
		Report	Cross	Stadium: Home Park; Attendance: 5,563

27 April 1993 44	Port Vale	3–0	Mansfield Town	Burslem
	Kerr; Taylor	Report		Stadium: Vale Park; Attendance: 9,996

4 May 1993 45	Exeter City	1–1	Port Vale	Exeter
		Report	Kerr (pen.)	Stadium: St James Park; Attendance: 3,219; Referee: R Hamer

8 May 1993 46	Blackpool	2–4	Port Vale	Blackpool
		Report	van der Laan; Kerr; Slaven; Taylor	Stadium: Bloomfield Road; Attendance: 9,295

=== Football League Second Division play-offs ===
16 May 1993 Semi-final First leg	Stockport County	1–1	Port Vale	Stockport
12:00 BST	Gannon 5' (pen.)	Report	Glover 24'	Stadium: Edgeley Park; Attendance: 7,856; Referee: Rodger Gifford

19 May 1993 Semi-final Second leg	Port Vale	1–0	Stockport County	Burslem
12:00 BST	Foyle 84'	Report		Stadium: Vale Park; Attendance: 12,689; Referee: David Elleray

30 May 1993 Final	West Bromwich Albion	3–0	Port Vale	London
15:00 BST	Hunt 66'; Reid 82'; Donovan 90'	Report		Stadium: Wembley Stadium; Attendance: 53,471; Referee: Roger Milford

=== FA Cup ===
16 November 1992 R1	Stoke City	0–0	Port Vale	Stoke-upon-Trent
		Report		Stadium: Victoria Ground; Attendance: 24,490

24 November 1992 Replay	Port Vale	3–1	Stoke City	Burslem
	Foyle; Porter	Report	Sandford	Stadium: Vale Park; Attendance: 19,810

5 December 1992 R2	Altrincham	1–4	Port Vale	Altrincham
		Report	Swan; Foyle; Taylor van der Laan	Stadium: Moss Lane; Attendance: 3,859

2 January 1993 R3	Newcastle United	4–0	Port Vale	Newcastle upon Tyne
	Peacock 49', 62'; Lee 66'; Kevin Sheedy 80'	Report		Stadium: St James' Park; Attendance: 29,873

=== League Cup ===
18 August 1992 R1 1st Leg	Bolton Wanderers	2–1	Port Vale	Bolton
	Green; Stubbs	Report	Foyle	Stadium: Burnden Park; Attendance: 3,282

25 August 1992 R1 2nd Leg	Port Vale	1–1 (2–3 agg.)	Bolton Wanderers	Burslem
	Taylor	Report	Walker	Stadium: Vale Park; Attendance: 4,870

=== Football League Trophy ===
12 January 1993 R2	Port Vale	4–3	Fulham	Burslem
	Glover (pen.); Foyle; Taylor	Report		Stadium: Vale Park; Attendance: 3,851

2 February 1993 R3	Port Vale	4–2	Northampton Town	Burslem
	Swan; Smith; Kerr; Walker	Report	Scott; Chard	Stadium: Vale Park; Attendance: 4,834

3 March 1993 Southern Section Semi-final	Stoke City	0–1	Port Vale	Stoke-upon-Trent
		Report	van der Laan	Stadium: Victoria Ground; Attendance: 22,254

16 March 1993 Southern Area final First leg	Port Vale	2–1	Exeter City	Burslem
	Kerr (pen.); Taylor	Report		Stadium: Vale Park; Attendance: 8,866; Referee: DJ Gallagher

21 April 1993 Southern Area final Second leg	Exeter City	1–1 (2–3 agg.)	Port Vale	Exeter
		Report	Slaven	Stadium: St James Park; Attendance: 7,060; Referee: R Gifford

22 May 1993 Final	Port Vale	2–1	Stockport County	London
	Kerr 4'; Slaven 37'	Report	Francis 66'	Stadium: Wembley Stadium; Attendance: 35,881; Referee: David Elleray; Man of the Match: Bernie Slaven / Peter Swan

== Squad statistics ==
=== Appearances and goals ===
Key to positions: GK – Goalkeeper; DF – Defender; MF – Midfielder; FW – Forward

No.	Pos	Nat	Player	Total		Second Division		FA Cup		Other	
No.	Pos	Nat	Player	Apps	Goals	Apps	Goals	Apps	Goals	Apps	Goals
	GK	(England) ENG	Paul Musselwhite	54	0	41	0	4	0	9	0
	GK	(Northern Ireland) NIR	Trevor Wood	7	0	5	0	0	0	2	0
	DF	(England) ENG	Neil Aspin	46	0	35	0	3	0	8	0
	DF	(England) ENG	Peter Billing	17	0	12	0	0	0	5	0
	DF	(England) ENG	Dean Glover	52	6	39	3	3	0	10	3
	DF	(England) ENG	Simon Mills	5	0	3	0	1	0	1	0
	DF	(England) ENG	Bradley Sandeman	29	1	22	1	3	0	4	0
	DF	(England) ENG	Chris Sulley	51	1	40	1	4	0	7	0
	DF	(England) ENG	Peter Swan	51	5	38	3	4	1	9	1
	MF	(England) ENG	John Jeffers	33	2	26	2	4	0	3	0
	MF	(England) ENG	Kevin Kent	37	1	27	1	0	0	10	0
	MF	(England) ENG	Paul Kerr	50	14	38	11	1	0	11	3
	MF	(England) ENG	Andy Porter	25	2	17	1	2	1	6	0
	MF	(England) ENG	Ian Taylor	56	19	41	15	4	1	11	3
	MF	(England) ENG	Ray Walker	44	9	35	8	4	0	5	1
	MF	(Netherlands) NED	Robin van der Laan	50	8	38	6	2	1	10	1
	FW	(England) ENG	Nicky Cross	47	12	37	12	4	0	6	0
	FW	(England) ENG	Martin Foyle	29	10	16	4	4	3	9	3
	FW	(England) ENG	Keith Houchen	32	6	28	6	1	0	3	0
	FW	(Scotland) SCO	Bernie Slaven	15	4	10	2	0	0	5	2
Players who featured but departed the club during the season:
	DF	(England) ENG	Mark Smith	7	1	6	0	0	0	1	1
	FW	(England) ENG	Kevin Bartlett	5	1	5	1	0	0	0	0
	FW	(Scotland) SCO	Alex Mathie	3	0	3	0	0	0	0	0

=== Top scorers ===
Place	Position	Nation	Name	Second Division	Play-offs	FA Cup	League Cup	Football League Trophy	Total
1	MF	England	Ian Taylor	15	0	1	1	2	19
2	MF	England	Paul Kerr	11	0	0	0	3	14
3	FW	England	Nicky Cross	12	0	0	0	0	12
4	FW	England	Martin Foyle	4	1	3	1	1	10
5	MF	England	Ray Walker	8	0	0	0	1	9
6	MF	Netherlands	Robin van der Laan	6	0	1	0	1	8
7	DF	England	Dean Glover	3	1	0	0	2	6
–	FW	England	Keith Houchen	6	0	0	0	0	6
9	DF	England	Peter Swan	3	0	1	0	1	5
10	FW	Scotland	Bernie Slaven	2	0	0	0	2	4
11	MF	England	John Jeffers	2	0	0	0	0	2
–	MF	England	Andy Porter	1	0	1	0	0	2
13	DF	England	Chris Sulley	1	0	0	0	0	1
–	DF	England	Bradley Sandeman	1	0	0	0	0	1
–	MF	England	Kevin Kent	1	0	0	0	0	1
–	DF	England	Mark Smith	0	0	0	0	1	1
–	FW	England	Kevin Bartlett	1	0	0	0	0	1
–		–	Own goals	2	0	0	0	0	2
			TOTALS	79	2	7	2	14	104

== Transfers ==
=== Transfers in ===
Date from	Position	Nationality	Name	From	Fee	Ref.
May 1992	MF	ENG	Ian Taylor	Moor Green	£25,000	
30 July 1992	GK	ENG	Paul Musselwhite	Scunthorpe United	£17,500	
July 1992	MF	ENG	Paul Kerr	Millwall	£140,000	
July 1992	DF	ENG	Bradley Sandeman	Maidstone United	Free transfer	
July 1992	DF	ENG	Chris Sulley	Blackburn Rovers	Free transfer	
March 1993	FW	SCO	Bernie Slaven	Middlesbrough	Free transfer	

=== Transfers out ===
Date from	Position	Nationality	Name	To	Fee	Ref.
June 1993	FW	ENG	Keith Houchen	Hartlepool United	Free transfer	
June 1993	DF	ENG	Chris Sulley	Preston North End	Free transfer	

=== Loans in ===
Date from	Position	Nationality	Name	From	Date to	Ref.
1992	FW	ENG	Kevin Bartlett	Notts County	1992	
1992	DF	ENG	Mark Smith	Notts County	1993	
February 1993	DF	ENG	Peter Billing	Coventry City	End of season	
April 1993	FW	SCO	Alex Mathie	(Scotland) Greenock Morton	April 1993	
