= Trevor Wood =

Northern Irish footballer (born 1968)

Personal information
- Full name: Trevor John Wood
- Date of birth: 3 November 1968 (age 57)
- Place of birth: Saint Helier, Jersey
- Height: 6 ft 0 in (1.83 m)
- Position: Goalkeeper

Youth career
- 1985–1986: Brighton & Hove Albion

Senior career*
Years	Team	Apps	(Gls)
1986–1988	Brighton & Hove Albion	0	(0)
1987–1988	→ Salisbury City (loan)		
1988–1994	Port Vale	42	(0)
1994–1997	Walsall	69	(0)
1997	Hereford United	19	(0)
1997–2001	St Patrick's Athletic	100	(0)
Total		230	(0)

International career
1995	Northern Ireland	1	(0)
1996	Northern Ireland B	1	(0)
- * Club domestic league appearances and goals

Trevor John Wood (born 3 November 1968) is a former professional footballer who played as a goalkeeper. He played 130 league games in the English Football League and 100 league games in the League of Ireland. He won one international cap for Northern Ireland in 1995.

Wood began his career at Brighton & Hove Albion. He did not feature in the first team, though he spent time on loan at Salisbury City. He signed with Port Vale in May 1988. Mostly a backup keeper for the "Valiants", he moved on to Walsall in May 1994. He helped the "Saddlers" to promotion out of the Third Division in 1994–95, before he signed with Hereford United in 1997. He then moved to Ireland to play for St Patrick's Athletic, and helped his new club to the League of Ireland title in 1997–98 and 1998–99, before he retired in 2001.

== Playing career ==
=== Brighton & Hove Albion ===
Wood was a squad member for Brighton & Hove Albion and spent the 1987–88 season on loan at Salisbury City in the Southern League Southern Division.

=== Port Vale ===
After a successful trial, he moved to John Rudge's Port Vale in May 1988. He kept a clean sheet on his debut; a 2–0 home win over Huddersfield Town on 3 October 1988. Despite this he was used mainly as a reserve keeper. He made only two appearances in the Third Division as back-up to Mark Grew and loanee Mike Stowell during the promotion campaign of 1988–89. He played just three Second Division games in 1989–90, with Grew retaining his place between the sticks at Vale Park. Wood earned the first-team jersey in August 1990. He injured his thigh however, in a 2–0 defeat at Oldham Athletic on 16 February 1991, and took two months to win his first-team place back. He made 37 appearances in all competitions in 1990–91, being preferred ahead of Grew. In August 1991, he once more fell out of favour, as Grew played every minute of the 1991–92 campaign. Wood was in goal for the 4–3 defeat on penalties to Go Ahead Eagles in the TNT Tournament on 9 August 1992, a tournament the Vale still managed to win. He started the 1992–93 season as first-choice keeper. Still, he lost his place to new signing Paul Musselwhite after five league games, having conceded a penalty at Vetch Field in an 'off the ball' incident with a Swansea player. At the end of the 1993–94 season, Wood was given a free transfer.

=== Walsall ===
Wood signed with Walsall in May 1994. The "Saddlers" won promotion out of the Third Division as runners-up in 1994–95 under the stewardship of Chris Nicholl. They then went on to finish eleventh in the Second Division in 1995–96.

=== Later career ===
Wood moved on to Graham Turner's Hereford United in the 1996–97 campaign. The "Bulls" finished bottom of the Football League, and were relegated into the Conference.

He then signed for St. Patrick's Athletic and played in the Champions League preliminary round against Celtic in 1998, keeping a clean sheet in a 0–0 draw at Celtic Park. Celtic won the second leg 2–0 at Tolka Park. The "Saints" won the League of Ireland title in 1997–98 and 1998–99, also boasting the best defensive record on both occasions. However, they dropped to sixth and fifth in 1999–2000 and 2000–01, and Wood left the club, having made 100 league appearances.

== International career ==
FIFA regulations at the time allowed a player born outside of the United Kingdom with a British passport to choose which national team he wanted to represent, despite the Jersey Football Association having county football association status within England's Football Association. Wood was the first player to take advantage of the lax regulations when he was called up for a qualifying game against Republic of Ireland for UEFA Euro 1996 in March 1995.

Wood earned a Northern Ireland cap on 11 October 1995 during the same qualifying campaign, coming on for Alan Fettis at half-time in a 4–0 win over Liechtenstein at the Sportpark Eschen-Mauren. He had been suggested to coach Bryan Hamilton by Chris Nicholl, his manager at Walsall. He then slipped down the international pecking order behind Fettis, Tommy Wright, Roy Carroll, and Aidan Davison. On 26 March 1996, he played in a rare Northern Ireland B team game, a 3–0 win over Norway Olympic XI at The Showgrounds in Coleraine.

== Career statistics ==
Appearances and goals by club, season and competition
Club	Season	League			FA Cup		Other		Total	
Club	Season	Division	Apps	Goals	Apps	Goals	Apps	Goals	Apps	Goals
Brighton & Hove Albion	1986–87	Second Division	0	0	0	0	0	0	0	0
Port Vale	1988–89	Third Division	2	0	0	0	0	0	2	0
Port Vale	1989–90	Second Division	3	0	0	0	1	0	4	0
Port Vale	1990–91	Second Division	32	0	2	0	3	0	37	0
Port Vale	1991–92	Second Division	0	0	0	0	0	0	0	0
Port Vale	1992–93	Second Division	5	0	0	0	2	0	7	0
Port Vale	Total		42	0	2	0	6	0	50	0
Walsall	1994–95	Third Division	39	0	5	0	6	0	50	0
Walsall	1995–96	Second Division	20	0	2	0	1	0	23	0
Walsall	1996–97	Second Division	10	0	0	0	0	0	10	0
Walsall	Total		69	0	7	0	7	0	83	0
Hereford United	1996–97	Third Division	19	0	0	0	0	0	19	0
St Patrick's Athletic	1997–98	League of Ireland Premier Division	33	0						
St Patrick's Athletic	1998–99	League of Ireland Premier Division	33	0						
St Patrick's Athletic	1999–2000	League of Ireland Premier Division	33	0						
St Patrick's Athletic	2000–01	League of Ireland Premier Division	1	0						
St Patrick's Athletic	Total		100	0						
Career total			230	0	9	0	13	0	252	0

== Honours ==
Walsall

- Football League Third Division second-place promotion: 1994–95

St Patrick's Athletic

- League of Ireland: 1997–98, 1998–99
