= Andy Porter (footballer, born 1968) =

English football player and manager (born 1968)

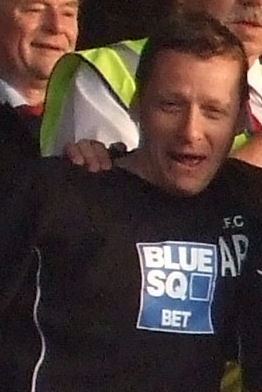
- Porter with York City in 2009

Personal information
- Full name: Andrew Michael Porter
- Date of birth: 17 September 1968 (age 58)
- Place of birth: Holmes Chapel, England
- Height: 5 ft 9 in (1.75 m)
- Position: Midfielder

Youth career
- 198?–1985: Manchester City
- 1985–1986: Port Vale

Senior career*
Years	Team	Apps	(Gls)
1986–1998	Port Vale	357	(22)
1987	→ Hutt Valley United (loan)		
1998–2000	Wigan Athletic	21	(1)
1999	→ Mansfield Town (loan)	5	(0)
2000	→ Chester City (loan)	16	(0)
2000–2002	Chester City	48	(4)
2002	→ Northwich Victoria (loan)		
2002	→ Kidsgrove Athletic (loan)		
2002–2003	Kidsgrove Athletic		
2004–2006	Port Vale	4	(0)
2011	Alsager Town		
Total		451	(27)

Managerial career
- 2001–2002: Chester City (caretaker)
- 2002–2003: Kidsgrove Athletic
- 2008: Port Vale (caretaker)
- 2010: York City (caretaker)
- * Club domestic league appearances and goals

Andrew Michael Porter (born 17 September 1968) is an English former professional footballer turned coach and manager. His playing career spanned from 1986 to 2006; for most of his career, he played for Port Vale. His successes with the club include winning promotion out of the Third Division via the play-offs in 1989, lifting the Football League Trophy in 1993, and playing in the final of the Anglo-Italian Cup in 1996. He later played for Wigan Athletic, Mansfield Town, Chester City, Northwich Victoria, and Kidsgrove Athletic.

He served Port Vale as co-caretaker manager alongside Dean Glover. He managed Kidsgrove Athletic from 2002 to 2003 and has also spent short periods as caretaker manager at Chester City, Port Vale, and York City. He worked as assistant manager to Martin Foyle at Hereford United from June 2012 to March 2014.

== Playing career ==
=== Port Vale ===
Born in Holmes Chapel, Cheshire, Porter joined Port Vale as a youngster after being released by Manchester City. He made his Football League debut in December 1986, and played on loan in New Zealand with Hutt Valley United to gain first-team experience. He signed a professional contract with Vale on 29 June 1987. He was named the club's Young Player of the Year in both the 1988–89 and 1989–90 seasons. He went on to have a long association with the Vale Park club, with fansite OneValeFan describing how he "gave passion, power and energy to a Vale side and as a result he was often moved around the midfield". On 24 November 1992, he scored in a 3–1 win over Potteries derby rivals Stoke City in an FA Cup first round replay; he later said "that goal against Stoke meant a lot". He played in the 1993 Football League Trophy final, a 2–1 victory over Stockport County at Wembley Stadium.

His spell with Vale had been one of the most successful the club had enjoyed for many years, including FA Cup giant-killing acts and twice winning promotion to the second tier of English football. He captained the club in the 1996 Anglo-Italian Cup final, as Vale lost 5–2 to Genoa. He enjoyed a testimonial match against Derby County in 1996. On 26 December 1996, he performed a successful man-marking job on Manchester City's Georgi Kinkladze to keep the Georgian quiet and help Vale to record a 1–0 win. His 431 appearances in all competitions means he has the fifth most appearances of any Vale player over all competitions. He was also known by his nickname of "Goober".

=== Later career ===
Porter moved on to Wigan Athletic in July 1998 but struggled to establish himself at the club, with the manager who had signed him – John Deehan – leaving the club in pre-season. Porter spent time on loan with Mansfield Town in October 1999 before ending the season on loan with Chester City. Still, he could not help them avoid relegation to the Conference. In October 2000, he joined Chester permanently and helped the club win the Nationwide Variety Club Trophy at the end of the season. On 27 December 2001, Porter was named as Chester's joint caretaker manager alongside Dean Spink following the sacking of Steve Mungall, and their first and only match in charge was a 3–1 home win over Hayes on 29 December. They remained in this position until Owen Brown and Alan Lewer took temporary charge on 4 January 2002.

Despite Porter scoring a winning penalty against Barnet the following month, he was soon deemed surplus to requirements by manager Mark Wright. He spent time on loan with Northwich Victoria. He joined Kidsgrove Athletic on loan in September 2002, before later becoming a coach at the club.

== Coaching and managerial career ==
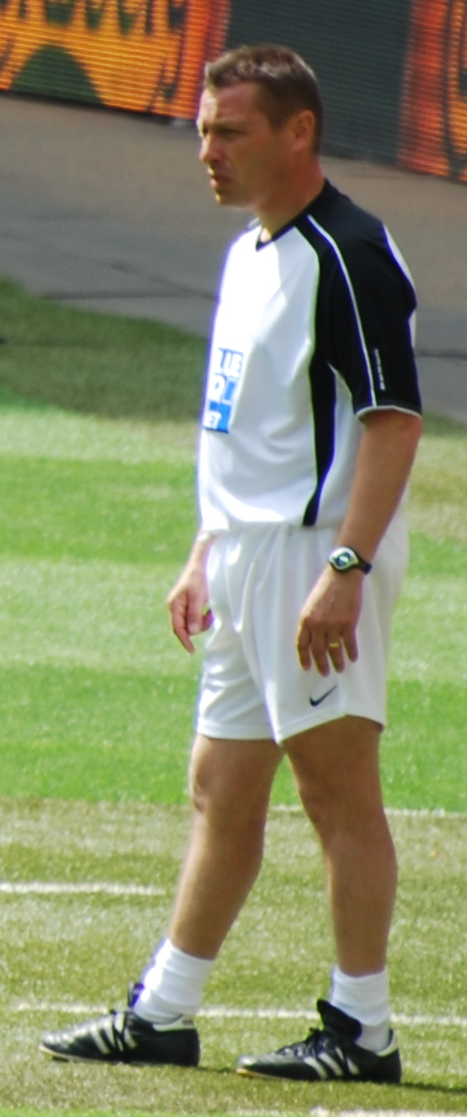
Porter with York City in the 2009 FA Trophy final

Porter was appointed caretaker player-manager at Kidsgrove alongside Terry Hillman after they sacked Dave Nolan on 14 November 2002 and was offered the job permanently on 31 December 2002. He resigned as manager on 28 March 2003, with Bernard Taylor being appointed as his successor. Following his spell at Kidsgrove manager, Porter returned to Port Vale as a youth coach. In December 2004, Porter made a playing comeback when he replaced Levi Reid early in Vale's 3–1 win over Tranmere Rovers. Over the next two seasons, he made three more Football League and two FA Cup appearances under manager Martin Foyle, his former teammate at Vale. A move to Nantwich Town in March 2006 was blocked by Foyle as the club were short-staffed.

Following these brief cameos, Porter settled down to his duties as a youth coach and achieved great success with the youth team in 2007 and 2008. In the summer of 2007, the youth team entered the prestigious Irish youth tournament, the Foyle Cup, beating AFC Bournemouth 1–0 in the under-18s final to claim the trophy. Porter also steered the team to a club-record quarter-final appearance in the FA Youth Cup, beating Premier League academy sides Bolton Wanderers (3–2 at the Reebok Stadium) and Tottenham Hotspur (1–0 at Vale Park) along the way, before losing to eventual finalists Chelsea 5–2.

Porter's charges then won the Midland Youth Cup for the first time in decades, beating Lincoln City 6–5 on a penalty shoot-out after a 1–1 draw at Sincil Bank. He had also taken charge of the reserve team for the majority of the 2007–08 season and managed to finish second in The Central League Midland Division in front of several higher-placed clubs and clubs with youth academy status.

Following Lee Sinnott's departure as manager, Porter and Dean Glover were appointed as caretaker managers on 23 September 2008. He was in the running for the role permanently, but it was eventually handed to Glover on 6 October. Porter departed as manager of the Port Vale youth team on 24 December.

He teamed up again with Martin Foyle after being appointed as York City's assistant manager on 30 December. Glover was sacked as Vale manager in May 2009, and Porter applied for the vacant position once again. However, chairman Bill Bratt was determined to hire a manager of experience and so Porter was not considered for the role. He took over as caretaker manager at York on 24 September 2010 following Foyle's resignation and his first game in charge was a 3–1 victory away at Tamworth the following day. After two weeks in charge, on 6 October 2010, Porter also left the club.

On 12 February 2011, Porter turned out for Alsager Town in their North West Counties Football League Premier Division 2–0 defeat to Glossop North End. The 42-year-old played for the full ninety minutes as a favour to the club, who put out a makeshift first XI after a period of disarray. Later in the year he was appointed as a youth coach at Stockport County.

In June 2012, Foyle appointed Porter as his assistant when he took over his new role as manager of Hereford United. He left the club when Foyle departed as manager in March 2014. The following year he began helping Foyle in his dual roles at Port Vale and Northampton Town, coaching the under-11's at the Port Vale academy and doing regional scouting for Northampton. He was appointed onto the coaching staff at Nantwich Town in January 2022.

== Personal life ==
His son, Lewis Porter, signed with Stafford Rangers in 2023.

== Career statistics ==
=== Playing statistics ===
Appearances and goals by club, season and competition
Club	Season	League			FA Cup		Other (Note: Includes League Cup, Football League Trophy, English Football League play-offs, Full Members Cup, and Anglo-Italian Cup.)		Total	
Club	Season	Division	Apps	Goals	Apps	Goals	Apps	Goals	Apps	Goals
Port Vale	1986–87	Third Division	1	0	0	0	1	0	2	0
Port Vale	1987–88	Third Division	6	0	1	0	2	0	9	0
Port Vale	1988–89	Third Division	14	1	0	0	4	0	18	1
Port Vale	1989–90	Second Division	36	1	3	0	5	0	44	1
Port Vale	1990–91	Second Division	40	0	1	0	3	0	44	0
Port Vale	1991–92	Second Division	32	1	1	0	6	0	39	1
Port Vale	1992–93	Second Division	17	1	2	1	6	0	25	2
Port Vale	1993–94	Second Division	37	0	5	1	3	0	45	1
Port Vale	1994–95	First Division	44	3	2	0	4	0	50	3
Port Vale	1995–96	First Division	45	10	6	1	10	1	61	12
Port Vale	1996–97	First Division	44	4	1	0	6	0	51	4
Port Vale	1997–98	First Division	41	1	2	0	1	0	44	1
Port Vale	Total		357	22	24	3	51	1	432	26
Wigan Athletic	1998–99	Second Division	16	1	1	0	8	0	25	1
Wigan Athletic	1999–2000	Second Division	5	0	0	0	1	0	6	0
Wigan Athletic	Total		21	1	1	0	9	0	31	1
Mansfield Town (loan)	1999–2000	Third Division	5	0	1	0	0	0	6	0
Chester City (loan)	1999–2000	Third Division	16	0	0	0	0	0	16	0
Chester City	2000–01	Conference National	12	2	3	0	3	0	18	2
Chester City	2001–02	Conference National	36	2	0	0	1	0	37	2
Chester City	Total		48	4	3	0	4	0	55	4
Port Vale	2004–05	League One	2	0	0	0	0	0	2	0
Port Vale	2005–06	League One	2	0	2	0	0	0	4	0
Port Vale	Total		4	0	2	0	0	0	6	0
Career total			451	27	31	3	64	1	546	31

=== Managerial statistics ===
Managerial record by team and tenure
Team	From	To	Record					Ref
Team	From	To	P	W	D	L	Win %	Ref
Chester City (caretaker)	27 December 2001	4 January 2002	1	1	0	0	100.0	
Port Vale (caretaker)	23 September 2008	6 October 2008	2	0	0	2	0.0	
York City (caretaker)	24 September 2010	6 October 2010	4	1	1	2	25.0	
Total			7	2	1	4	28.6	

== Honours ==
=== As a player ===
Port Vale

- Football League Third Division play-offs: 1989
- Football League Trophy: 1992–93
