= Calvin Plummer =

English footballer

Personal information
- Date of birth: 14 February 1963 (age 63)
- Place of birth: Nottingham, England
- Position: Winger

Senior career*
Years	Team	Apps	(Gls)
1981–1982	Nottingham Forest	14	(2)
1982–1983	Chesterfield	28	(7)
1983–1984	Derby County	27	(3)
1984–1986	Barnsley	54	(7)
1986–1988	Nottingham Forest	8	(2)
1988–1989	Plymouth Argyle	23	(1)
1989–1991	Chesterfield	71	(12)
- * Club domestic league appearances and goals

Calvin Plummer (born 14 February 1963) is an English former professional footballer born in Nottingham who played as a winger in the Football League for Nottingham Forest, Chesterfield, Derby County, Barnsley and Plymouth Argyle. He also played on loan for Derry City in the League of Ireland playing in the 1988 FAI Cup Final and for Lahden Reipas in Finland, and for English non-league clubs Gainsborough Trinity, Shepshed Albion, Corby Town, Nuneaton Borough, Birstall United, Grantham Town, Arnold Town, Shepshed Dynamo and Kirby Muxloe. He was manager of Bilborough and joint manager of Arnold Town, before taking becoming assistant manager at Gedling Miners Welfare.

Plummer also caused controversy in 1982, when he agreed to play on an unofficial tour of South Africa. The tour, organised by Jimmy Hill and sponsored by South African Breweries, was largely made up of players heading toward the end of their careers. Plummer's presence as the only younger player, as well as the only black player in the initial squad, gave rise to accusations of tokenism. The tour itself was both a footballing and public relations disaster and caused great damage to Plummer's career. Brian Clough, his Nottingham Forest manager at the time, was publicly critical of Plummer's naivety and relations did sour between them. Despite this, Clough re-signed Plummer later in his career.
