= Paul Atkinson (footballer, born 1966) =

English footballer

Personal information
- Full name: Paul Atkinson
- Date of birth: 19 January 1966 (age 60)
- Place of birth: Chester-le-Street, England
- Height: 5 ft 9 in (1.75 m)
- Position: Midfielder

Youth career
- 1981–1983: Sunderland

Senior career*
Years	Team	Apps	(Gls)
1983–1988	Sunderland	56	(5)
1988–1991	Port Vale	4	(3)
1989	→ Stafford Rangers (loan)	0	(0)
1990	→ Hartlepool United (loan)	11	(1)
	Gateshead	0	(0)
Total		71	(9)

International career
1983	England U17	4	(1)
1982–1985	England Youth	18	(0)
1985	England U19	4	(0)
- * Club domestic league appearances and goals

Paul Atkinson (born 19 January 1966) is an English former footballer who played on the left-side of midfield. He appeared three times for England Youth in a tournament in 1983, and played another five games the following year. He began his career at Sunderland, and helped the "Black Cats" to the Third Division title in 1987–88. He joined Port Vale for a £20,000 fee in June 1988, but soon became blighted by injury. He was loaned out to Stafford Rangers and Hartlepool United to help to regain his fitness, but was forced to retire from professional football on medical advice in January 1991.

== Career ==
Atkinson began his career at Sunderland, winning 18 caps for the England youth team between 1982 and 1985. He made his first-team debut at home to Norwich City on 27 August 1983. Alan Durban's side went on to post a 13th-place finish in the First Division in 1983–84. The club suffered relegation in the 1984–85 season under the stewardship of Len Ashurst. Lawrie McMenemy then took charge at Roker Park but failed to halt the club's decline, as Sunderland finished 18th in the Second Division in 1985–86, before suffering relation in 1986–87 after defeat to Gillingham in the play-offs. New boss Denis Smith then led the club straight back up as champions of the Third Division in 1987–88. Smith claimed Atkinson squandered his natural talents by overeating junk food.

Atkinson signed for John Rudge's Port Vale in June 1988 for a £20,000 fee. He scored a brace on his debut in a 3–1 win over Preston North End at Deepdale on 27 August. An ankle injury blighted his career however, and loan spells with Stafford Rangers (January 1989) and Cyril Knowles's Hartlepool United (March 1990) failed to revitalise his career. He played six games for the "Valiants" in 1988–89, and eleven Fourth Division games in his loan spell at Victoria Park. He was forced to retire from professional football on medical advice in January 1991.

== Style of play ==
Atkinson was a speedy midfielder.

== Career statistics ==
Appearances and goals by club, season and competition
Club	Season	League			FA Cup		Other		Total	
Club	Season	Division	Apps	Goals	Apps	Goals	Apps	Goals	Apps	Goals
Sunderland	1983–84	First Division	8	1	0	0	0	0	8	1
Sunderland	1984–85	First Division	9	1	0	0	1	0	10	1
Sunderland	1985–86	Second Division	13	0	3	0	2	0	18	0
Sunderland	1986–87	Second Division	5	0	0	0	4	0	9	0
Sunderland	1987–88	Third Division	21	3	2	2	4	0	27	5
Sunderland	Total		56	5	5	2	11	0	72	7
Port Vale	1988–89	Third Division	4	3	0	0	2	0	6	3
Port Vale	1989–90	Second Division	0	0	0	0	0	0	0	0
Port Vale	1990–91	Second Division	0	0	0	0	0	0	0	0
Port Vale	Total		4	3	0	0	2	0	6	3
Hartlepool United (loan)	1989–90	Fourth Division	11	1	0	0	0	0	11	1
Career total			71	9	5	2	13	0	89	11

== Honours ==
Sunderland

- Football League Third Division: 1987–88
