= Bill Bell (businessman) =

English football chairman (1932–2013)

- Born: William Thomas Bell; 21 January 1932; Burslem, Stoke-on-Trent, England
- Died: 12 February 2013 (aged 81); Brown Edge, England
- Occupation: Car dealer

Chairman of Port Vale
- In office 1987–2002
- Preceded by: Jim Lloyd
- Succeeded by: Bill Bratt

William Thomas Bell (21 January 1932 – 12 February 2013) was an English businessman and football club chairman who was the chair of Port Vale from 1987 to 2002. He spent the first twelve years at the club in partnership with manager John Rudge, until he controversially sacked Rudge in January 1999. As chairman, he concentrated his efforts on renovating and modernising Vale Park at great financial cost. However, the money for his ambitious projects dried up with his decision to axe Rudge, and he left the club in December 2002 when Port Vale entered administration.

== Early life ==
Bell was born in Burslem, Stoke-on-Trent on 21 January 1932, and became a supporter of Port Vale in 1948. He worked on the construction of Vale Park as a maintenance mechanic and later opened a car dealership called 'WT Bell'.

== Chairmanship of Port Vale ==
Bell became a board member at Port Vale in May 1984 and became the club's second-highest shareholder in April 1986, when he purchased 23,000 shares from former chairman Don Radcliffe. Bell then battled with chairman Jim Lloyd for control of the club, and won this battle on 14 May 1987. He stated: "There can be no room for sentiment in football, and if there are people here who do not do their jobs, they will have to go." He inherited as team manager John Rudge, who had formed a stable and successful Third Division side. However, attendances were low, and the club was losing around £50,000 a year and had an overdraft of £216,453. He purchased Lloyd's shares in November 1987, giving himself 60% of the total holding.

Vale were bottom of the table on 28 December 1987, and Bell sacked coach Alan Oakes and promoted 'hard taskmaster' Mike Pejic in his stead. As the team improved to reach safety, Bell then focused his work on improving Vale Park and announced the start of a 'five-year plan' for the stadium after decades of neglect. He purchased an electronic scoreboard for £20,000 at the Hamil Road end of the ground and installed executive boxes bought cheaply from Newcastle United. On 20 October 1989, he sold the club's training ground for £164,800; the ground had been bought for only £13,500 eight years previously. In December, the club announced plans for a 48-seater £80,000 disabled stand, the first such construction in the Football League. In February 1989, the new family enclosure was opened, with 600 seats. On the pitch, Rudge led the "Valiants" into the Second Division in 1989.

In the wake of the Hillsborough disaster, the Taylor Report meant that £250,000 worth of upgrades had to be made to Vale Park, with almost half of this amount being matched by the Football Trust. The ground's capacity was reduced to 12,000 as parts of the ground were deemed to be unsafe. The police costs also mounted, much to Bell's annoyance, costing the club over £50,000 a year. The Bycars End was renovated for £90,000, bringing the capacity up to 23,000. A new police box was constructed, whilst thousands of seats were installed to meet the all-seater requirements of the Taylor Report. Recently discovered mine shafts also had to be filled in, for £175,000, whilst police costs reached £250,000 a year.

In May 1991, plans were drawn up for a new 4,000-seater stand on the Bycars End, at £1 million. However, further problems emerged when the city council opened a market in Burslem town centre, and in an attempt to eliminate the competition closed Vale Park's market, which had been making the club £100,000 a year. The club's debt mounted, reaching close to £500,000. The team fared poorly in 1991–92, and Bell sacked Pejic, installing Bobby Downes as his replacement. In June, Bell negotiated the purchase of Chester City's grandstand at Sealand Road for £300,000, with half that sum coming from the Football Trust. It was placed above the Hamil Road Stand, the away end, and was opened for the league clash against Chester on 26 September 1992. At the end of the season, Rudge led the Vale to glory at Wembley in the Football League Trophy final. They followed up this success with promotion back to the second tier in 1993–94. However, Bell only offered Rudge a new contract at the end of the season, to the manager's disgruntlement.

The club were knocked out of the FA Cup at the second round in 1994–95 at the hands of Scarborough, and Bell commented on the "unacceptable situation" of the team's results. However, Bell continued to develop the stadium and announced a £1.4 million project to install seats at the Hamil End. In March 1995, £750,000 was spent on resurfacing the pitch and the purchase of a giant cover to protect the grass from frost. At the end of the campaign, Bell called a meeting to discuss Rudge's future; the manager remained in his post as he held the confidence of most of the club's directors and supporters.

On 26 April 1996, the club announced that a deal with the council had been reached to joint-finance a £1.6 million outdoor sports complex at Bycars Park. However, in October Bell put the club's players up for sale and threatened to sell or liquidate the club if he received any further abuse from critical supporters. No one came forward to buy the club, and the club's total debt was revealed to be £1.5 million.

In September 1997, plans were drawn up for a 5,000 seater stand on Lorne Street, with 14 executive boxes and a 300-seater restaurant; the stand would cost £1.8 million, with a £1.2 million being pledged by the Football Trust. Bell stated that "it is my ambition to see my job completed. We have decided to develop our own stadium fit for the Premiership". However, the team performed poorly, and Bell was vocal in his criticism of the team's results. With the club in the First Division relegation zone, Bell sacked Rudge in January 1999, who had been employed for 16 years. The fans abused Bell for his decision, and he again threatened to walk away from the club. He quickly appointed Brighton & Hove Albion boss Brian Horton as the new manager.

"Bill was Bill to the end – insuppressible, indomitable and true to his entrepreneurial spirit. When I called to see him just weeks ago in his new showroom, he was planning his latest improvement to the body shop and showcasing a vintage car, with great enthusiasm for the future. Not everyone always agreed with Bill, but his passion for Burslem and for the Vale was never in doubt."

— Stoke-on-Trent North MP Joan Walley.

Horton kept the team from relegation in 1998–99, but could not prevent Vale from suffering the drop in 1999–2000 despite Bell giving him the funds to sign new players. Bell also announced that £1 million had been spent filling in more mine shafts and that Vale was losing £20,000 a week. The financial situation worsened, and the club lost £400,000 from the collapse of ITV Digital in 2002. Bell put his shares up for sale in November 2002 and sold £40,000 worth of shares, nowhere near enough to pay off the £593,000 Vale owed the Inland Revenue. In December 2002, the club entered administration with debts of £2.4 million. The club was taken out of administration by the 'Valiant2001' consortium, and Bill Bratt became the new chairman. Bell maintained a quiet public profile after leaving the club, though he held a long-running legal dispute with the club over rent owed towards the club shop, which he still owned. Former marketing director Neil Hughes was put on trial at Stafford Crown Court after being accused of stealing more than £8,000 from the club, and he claimed in his May 2004 trial to have made up false invoices to cover tax and VAT with the knowledge of then chairman Bell; Bell denied the claim. He made headlines in September 2010, when a dispute with a builder at his Brown Edge home ended with Bell threatening the builder with an axe.
