= Simon Mills (footballer) =

British footballer (born 1964)

Personal information
- Full name: Simon Ashley Mills
- Date of birth: 16 August 1964 (age 62)
- Place of birth: Sheffield, England
- Height: 5 ft 8 in (1.73 m)
- Positions: Right-back; midfielder

Youth career
- 1980–1982: Sheffield Wednesday

Senior career*
Years	Team	Apps	(Gls)
1982–1985	Sheffield Wednesday	5	(0)
1985–1987	York City	99	(4)
1987–1994	Port Vale	184	(8)
1994–1995	Boston United	42	(1)
- Matlock Town
Total		330+	(13+)

International career
1983	England Youth	5	(0)
- * Club domestic league appearances and goals

Simon Ashley Mills (born 16 August 1964) is an English former footballer who played as a defender; he was described by Jeff Kent as "skilful and adaptable". He made 350 league and cup appearances in a ten-year career in the Football League.

He began his career with local club Sheffield Wednesday in 1982 before moving on to York City three years later. Voted Clubman of the Year in 1986, he was sold to Port Vale for £35,000 in December 1987. He helped the "Valiants" to win promotion out of the Third Division via the play-offs in 1989 before injuries forced him to leave the professional game in May 1994. He later attempted comebacks with Boston United and Matlock Town.

== Career ==
=== Sheffield Wednesday ===
Born in Sheffield, West Riding of Yorkshire, Mills started his professional career with Sheffield Wednesday in 1982 after a two-year apprenticeship. He was capped five times at England Youth level. He made his debut as a substitute in a 5–4 win over Charlton Athletic in January 1983. However, he failed to earn a first-team spot at Hillsborough, particularly following the "Owls" ascent to the First Division in 1983–84 under Howard Wilkinson's stewardship. He felt that he did not suit Wilkinson's style of football.

=== York City ===
Mills moved on to York City in June 1985 after manager Denis Smith spotted him playing reserve team football. The "Minstermen" finished seventh in the Third Division in 1985–86, and Mills was voted Clubman of the Year. However, a decline at Bootham Crescent saw the club slip to 20th in 1986–87, and Smith was replaced by Bobby Saxton. Mills was sold to John Rudge's Port Vale for £35,000 in December 1987. York went on to finish in the relegation places in 1987–88.

=== Port Vale ===
Unable to fit him into the side due to the form of Ray Walker and others, Rudge converted Mills from a midfielder to a right-back. He made 19 Third Division appearances in 1987–88, scoring five goals, including one in a 3–2 comeback win over former club York. He played 55 games in the 1988–89 promotion season, playing in partnership first with fellow centre-backs Phil Sproson and Bob Hazell (who both struggled with injuries) and later Gary West and Dean Glover (who were signed mid-season), alongside full-backs Alan Webb and Darren Hughes, in front of goalkeeper Mark Grew. This proved to be the most successful defence in the division, conceding just 48 goals in 46 league games. However, a third-place finish meant that they had to overcome Bristol Rovers 2–1 over two legs in the play-off final, with Robbie Earle hitting both goals. Mills missed just one Second Division game in 1989–90, forming a formidable defensive partnership with Glover.

He played 45 games in 1990–91, as Vale retained their second-tier status. He played 40 games in the 1991–92 relegation season, scoring twice, and helped the club to win the TNT Tournament in the summer. However, in autumn 1992 he developed knee cartilage trouble and underwent a series of unsuccessful operations, limiting him to just three league appearances in 1992–93. He commentated for BBC Radio Stoke at the 1993 Football League Trophy final. He was given a free transfer in May 1994.

=== Later career ===
After retiring as a professional, he later attempted a comeback with Northern Premier League Premier Division sides Boston United and Matlock Town.

== Style of play ==
Mills was a hard-working player who played at both right-back and midfield. He was an excellent set piece taker and part of Port Vale's "MBE" corner kick routine: Mills to Darren Beckford to Robbie Earle. In May 2019, he was voted into the "Ultimate Port Vale XI" as a right-back by members of the OneValeFan supporter website. In December 2025, supporters voted him onto the all-time Port Vale XI on the club's official website.

== Personal and later life ==
Mills married Mandy in 1989. He became a drayman at a Sheffield brewery after leaving football and attempted to start a business selling second-hand fishing gear.

== Career statistics ==
Appearances and goals by club, season and competition
Club	Season	League			FA Cup		Other		Total	
Club	Season	Division	Apps	Goals	Apps	Goals	Apps	Goals	Apps	Goals
Sheffield Wednesday	1982–83	Second Division	1	0	1	0	0	0	2	0
Sheffield Wednesday	1983–84	Second Division	2	0	0	0	0	0	2	0
Sheffield Wednesday	1984–85	First Division	2	0	0	0	0	0	2	0
Sheffield Wednesday	Total		5	0	1	0	0	0	6	0
York City	1985–86	Third Division	36	1	6	0	4	0	46	1
York City	1986–87	Third Division	45	1	3	1	6	1	54	3
York City	1987–88	Third Division	18	2	4	1	4	1	26	4
York City	Total		99	4	13	2	14	2	126	8
Port Vale	1987–88	Third Division	19	5	0	0	0	0	19	5
Port Vale	1988–89	Third Division	43	0	3	0	9	0	55	0
Port Vale	1989–90	Second Division	45	1	3	0	6	0	54	1
Port Vale	1990–91	Second Division	41	0	1	0	3	0	45	0
Port Vale	1991–92	Second Division	33	2	1	0	6	0	40	2
Port Vale	1992–93	Second Division	3	0	1	0	1	0	5	0
Port Vale	Total		184	8	9	0	25	0	218	8
Boston United	1994–95	Northern Premier League; Premier Division	36	1	3	0	4	0	43	1
Boston United	1995–96	Northern Premier League; Premier Division	6	0	1	0	2	0	9	0
Boston United	Total		42	1	4	0	6	0	52	1
Career total			330	13	27	2	45	2	402	17

== Honours ==
Port Vale

- Football League Third Division play-offs: 1989

Individual

- York City Clubman of the Year: 1985–86
