= Alan Simons =

Welsh footballer

Personal information
- Full name: Alan Geoffrey Simons
- Date of birth: 2 September 1968 (age 58)
- Place of birth: Wrexham, Wales
- Height: 6 ft 4 in (1.93 m)
- Position: Goalkeeper

Youth career
- Port Vale

Senior career*
Years	Team	Apps	(Gls)
1987–1988	Port Vale	1	(0)
Total		1	(0)
- * Club domestic league appearances and goals

Alan Geoffrey Simons (born 2 September 1968) is a Welsh former football goalkeeper who played one game in the Football League for Port Vale in November 1987.

== Career ==
Simons graduated through Port Vale juniors to sign professional forms with the team in September 1987, working as Mark Grew's understudy. He first-team debut came in a 1–1 draw with Doncaster Rovers at Belle Vue on 7 November. He managed to get a game in the FA Cup, but was released from Vale Park by manager John Rudge in March 1988.

== Career statistics ==
Appearances and goals by club, season and competition
Club	Season	League			FA Cup		Other		Total	
Club	Season	Division	Apps	Goals	Apps	Goals	Apps	Goals	Apps	Goals
Port Vale	1987–88	Third Division	1	0	1	0	0	0	2	0
Total			1	0	1	0	0	0	2	0
