= Lawrie Pearson =

English footballer

Personal information
- Full name: Lawrence Pearson
- Date of birth: 2 July 1965 (age 61)
- Place of birth: Wallsend, England
- Height: 6 ft 0 in (1.83 m)
- Position: Left-back

Youth career
- 1981–1983: Manchester United
- 1983–1984: Gateshead

Senior career*
| Years | Team | Apps | (Gls) |
| 1984–1987 | Hull City | 59 | (0) |
| 1987 | Bristol City | 0 | (0) |
| 1987–1988 | Port Vale | 3 | (0) |
- Whitley Bay
- Barrow
| 1990 | Winnipeg Fury | 5 | (2) |
| 1993–1994 | Darlington | 28 | (4) |
| 1994 | Chesterfield | 1 | (0) |
| 1994–1995 | Blyth Spartans | | |
| 1995–2000 | Whitby Town | | |
| 2000–2001 | Bedlington Terriers | | |
| 2001–2002 | South Shields | | |
| 2002 | Thornaby | | |
- * Club domestic league appearances and goals

Lawrence Pearson (born 2 July 1965) is an English former footballer who played at left-back. He made 91 league appearances in the Football League and also spent several seasons in non-League football.

Pearson began his career at Manchester United, playing in the 1982 FA Youth Cup final. He joined Hull City via Gateshead in 1984. He helped the club to win promotion out of the Third Division. He signed with Bristol City, before being traded to Port Vale in August 1987. He left the "Valiants" in January 1988 and played non-league football for Whitley Bay and Barrow. He briefly played with the Canadian Soccer League side Winnipeg Fury in 1990 before making a brief comeback in the Football League in 1993–94 with Darlington and Chesterfield. He then moved onto Blyth Spartans, and worked behind the scenes at Middlesbrough and Carlisle United.

== Career ==
Pearson began his career at Manchester United and was part of the side that were beaten by Watford in the final of the FA Youth Cup in 1982; his teammates in the game included Clayton Blackmore, Mark Hughes and Norman Whiteside. He never debuted at Old Trafford, though. Instead, he got his first taste of Football League action after he joined Brian Horton's Hull City via non-League Gateshead in 1984. The "Tigers" won promotion from the Third Division in 1984–85, before posting sixth and 14th-place finishes in the Second Division in 1985–86 and 1986–87. Pearson departed Boothferry Park and signed with Third Division Bristol City but did not make a league appearance for his new club.

He was traded to league rivals Port Vale, along with £25,000, in exchange for Russell Bromage in August 1987. He made his debut in a 4–2 win over Aldershot at Vale Park on 15 August, but after playing the next two games manager John Rudge signed Darren Hughes as a replacement. He only played three further cup games for the "Valiants", before having his contract cancelled by mutual consent in January 1988.

He moved on to non-League clubs Whitley Bay (Northern League) and Barrow (Northern Premier League and Conference), and spent time in Belgium. He also made five appearances in the Canadian Soccer League for the Winnipeg Fury in 1990, scoring two goals. He also played one of the two-legged play-off quarter-final games with Victoria Vistas. He returned to the English Football League with Darlington in 1993–94. Alan Murray's "Quakers" could only finish one place above the bottom of the league, and Pearson departed Feethams. He played once for Chesterfield before returning to the non-league circuit with Northern League side Blyth Spartans, where he was also installed as assistant manager. He joined Whitby Town in 1995. Pearson faced Hull City in the notorious 8–4 FA Cup replay at Boothferry Park in November 1996. He subsequently helped Whitby win the FA Vase in 1997.

== Post-retirement ==
After retirement, he became the community officer at Middlesbrough. He worked in the post for seven years before leaving the Riverside Stadium when Steve McClaren was appointed manager in 2001. He was then appointed Football in the Community Officer at Carlisle United. He left his post at Brunton Park in January 2005 for 'personal reasons'. He then worked as an academy coach at Manchester United for six years; he left in 2011 and began working at Leeds United. He then retired from coaching and ran sports camps in Wakefield. In 2018, Pearson became technical director of the York City Regional Talent Club.

== Career statistics ==
Appearances and goals by club, season and competition
| Club | Season | League | | | FA Cup | | Other | | Total | |
| Club | Season | Division | Apps | Goals | Apps | Goals | Apps | Goals | Apps | Goals |
|---|---|---|---|---|---|---|---|---|---|---|
| Hull City | 1984–85 | Third Division | 31 | 0 | 3 | 0 | 5 | 0 | 39 | 0 |
| Hull City | 1985–86 | Second Division | 20 | 0 | 0 | 0 | 4 | 0 | 24 | 0 |
| Hull City | 1986–87 | Second Division | 8 | 0 | 3 | 0 | 1 | 0 | 12 | 0 |
| Hull City | Total | | 59 | 0 | 6 | 0 | 10 | 0 | 75 | 0 |
| Bristol City | 1987–88 | Third Division | 0 | 0 | 0 | 0 | 0 | 0 | 0 | 0 |
| Port Vale | 1987–88 | Third Division | 3 | 0 | 0 | 0 | 3 | 0 | 6 | 0 |
| Winnipeg Fury | 1990 | Canadian Soccer League | 5 | 2 | — | | 1 | 0 | 6 | 2 |
| Darlington | 1993–94 | Third Division | 28 | 4 | 1 | 0 | 4 | 0 | 33 | 4 |
| Chesterfield | 1993–94 | Third Division | 1 | 0 | 0 | 0 | 0 | 0 | 1 | 0 |

== Honours ==
Manchester United

- FA Youth Cup runner-up: 1982

Hull City

- Football League Third Division third-place promotion: 1984–85

Whitby Town

- FA Vase: 1997
