= Simon Mills =

Simon Mills may refer to:

- Simon Mills (footballer) (born 1964), English former footballer
- Simon Mills, musician known for solo work as Napoleon, and member of electronica duo Bent
