= Kevin Steggles =

English footballer

Personal information
- Full name: Kevin Peter Steggles
- Date of birth: 19 March 1961 (age 65)
- Place of birth: Ditchingham, England
- Height: 6 ft 0 in (1.83 m)
- Position: Right-back

Youth career
- 1978–1980: Ipswich Town

Senior career*
Years	Team	Apps	(Gls)
1980–1986	Ipswich Town	50	(1)
1983–1984	→ Southend United (loan)	3	(0)
1986	→ Fulham (loan)	3	(0)
1986–1987	West Bromwich Albion	14	(0)
1987–1988	Port Vale	20	(0)
1988–1991	Bury Town		
1991–199?	Brantham Athletic		
- Great Yarmouth
- Woodbridge Town
2000–2001	Felixstowe & Walton United		
Total		90+	(1+)
- * Club domestic league appearances and goals

Kevin Peter Steggles (born 19 March 1961) is an English former footballer who played at right-back. He made 90 league appearances in an eight-year career in the Football League.

== Career ==
Steggles began his career at Ipswich Town, who were competing at the top of the First Division in 1980–81 and 1981–82 under the stewardship of Bobby Robson, before dropping to ninth position in 1982–83 after Bobby Ferguson took charge. Steggles contributed to Ipswich's victorious 1980–81 UEFA Cup campaign, making two appearances during the run, including the semi-final second leg. However, he was not part of the squad for the final itself. He was loaned out to Southend United in 1983–84, playing three games at Roots Hall; the "Shrimpers" were relegated out of the Third Division at the end of the season. The "Blues" finished 17th in 1984–85, before suffering relegation in 1985–86. He spent a brief time on loan at Fulham in 1986–87, playing three games at Craven Cottage. He then left Portman Road in February 1987. He spent the rest of the season in the Second Division with West Bromwich Albion, playing 14 league games for Ron Saunders's "Baggies". He joined Third Division Port Vale for 'a small fee' in November 1987 to cover for the injured Alan Webb. He made twenty league and five FA Cup appearances in 1987–88, before losing his place in April after Webb recovered from his injury. Manager John Rudge handed him a free transfer away from Vale Park in May 1988, and Steggles moved on to play for Southern League side Bury Town, and then Eastern Counties League clubs Brantham Athletic, Great Yarmouth, Woodbridge Town, and Felixstowe & Walton United.

== Career statistics ==
Appearances and goals by club, season and competition
Club	Season	League			FA Cup		Other		Total	
Club	Season	Division	Apps	Goals	Apps	Goals	Apps	Goals	Apps	Goals
Ipswich Town	1980–81	First Division	6	0	0	0	2	0	8	0
Ipswich Town	1981–82	First Division	18	1	1	0	3	1	22	2
Ipswich Town	1982–83	First Division	9	0	2	0	0	0	11	0
Ipswich Town	1983–84	First Division	5	0	0	0	1	0	6	0
Ipswich Town	1984–85	First Division	6	0	0	0	0	0	6	0
Ipswich Town	1985–86	First Division	6	0	0	0	2	0	8	0
Ipswich Town	Total		50	1	3	0	8	1	61	2
Southend United (loan)	1983–84	Third Division	3	0	0	0	1	0	4	0
Fulham (loan)	1986–87	Third Division	3	0	0	0	0	0	3	0
West Bromwich Albion	1986–87	Second Division	10	0	0	0	0	0	10	0
West Bromwich Albion	1987–88	Second Division	4	0	0	0	2	0	6	0
West Bromwich Albion	Total		14	0	0	0	2	0	16	0
Port Vale	1987–88	Third Division	20	0	5	0	1	0	26	0
Career total			90	1	8	0	12	1	110	2

== Honours ==
Ipswich Town

- UEFA Cup: 1981
