= Gary Hamson =

English footballer (born 1959)

Personal information
- Full name: Gary Hamson
- Date of birth: 24 August 1959 (age 67)
- Place of birth: Nottingham, England
- Height: 5 ft 8 in (1.73 m)
- Position: Midfielder

Youth career
- Ilkeston Town

Senior career*
Years	Team	Apps	(Gls)
1976–1979	Sheffield United	108	(8)
1979–1986	Leeds United	134	(3)
1986	Bristol City	12	(2)
1986–1988	Port Vale	38	(3)
Total		292	(16)
- * Club domestic league appearances and goals

Gary Hamson (born 24 August 1959) is an English former footballer. A midfielder, he scored 15 goals in 292 league appearances in a 12-year career in the Football League with Sheffield United, Leeds United, Bristol City, and Port Vale. He retired as a player in March 1988, and after a brief spell coaching at Port Vale he took up work as a financial adviser.

== Career ==
Hamson had trials with Derby County and played for Ilkeston Town before he joined Sheffield United, turning professional in November 1976. United finished the 1976–77 season in 11th place in the Second Division under the stewardship of Jimmy Sirrel. The "Blades" then ended the 1977–78 campaign in 12th place under new boss Harry Haslam, before suffering relegation in 1978–79. Hamson scored nine goals in 124 appearances in league and cup competitions during his three years at Bramall Lane. He was sold to Jimmy Adamson's Leeds United for a £140,000 fee in July 1979. He played 19 First Division games in the 1979–80 season, and played 14 games in the 1980–81 campaign under Allan Clarke's stewardship; his appearances in the latter campaign were restricted due to a nine-match ban he picked up for picking up too many yellow cards. He claimed three goals in 21 games in the 1981–82 season as the "Whites" dropped into the Second Division; he also picked up an injury against West Bromwich Albion that seriously affected his career at Elland Road. He was forced to sit out the entirety of the 1982–83 season, save for one appearance in the FA Cup. He returned to manager Eddie Gray's first-team plans and posted 28 appearances in the 1983–84 season and 32 appearances in the 1984–85 season, and then played 34 matches for new boss Billy Bremner in the 1985–86 campaign.

Hamson moved on to Bristol City in July 1986, with "Robins" manager Terry Cooper picking him up on a free transfer. He scored one goal in 12 Third Division games before losing his first-team place at Ashton Gate halfway through the 1986–87 season. He was bought by Port Vale manager John Rudge for a £5,000 fee in December 1986. He was a regular feature on the left side of the Vale midfield, making 27 Third Division appearances in the 1986–87 season and scoring one goal in a 4–2 win over Doncaster Rovers at Vale Park on 3 February. He claimed three goals in 18 league and cup games in the 1987–88 season, but was forced to retire in March 1988 due to an ankle injury.

== Personal life ==
After retiring as a player, Hamson was appointed as youth coach at Port Vale. He quit this post in July 1989 to become a builder. He later served on the Erewash Borough Council as a Liberal Democrat; Hamson is now a co-owner of a financial advisers in Derbyshire and also the agent of winger Aiden McGeady. He became an independent financial advisor for Hallmark-ifa in 2000. He has a wife and four sons.

== Career statistics ==
Appearances and goals by club, season and competition
Club	Season	League			FA Cup		Other^{[A]}		Total	
Club	Season	Division	Apps	Goals	Apps	Goals	Apps	Goals	Apps	Goals
Sheffield United	1976–77	Second Division	29	1	2	0	0	0	31	0
Sheffield United	1977–78	Second Division	38	3	1	0	5	0	44	3
Sheffield United	1978–79	Second Division	41	4	2	0	5	1	48	5
Sheffield United	Total		108	8	5	0	10	1	123	9
Leeds United	1979–80	First Division	19	1	1	0	2	0	22	1
Leeds United	1980–81	First Division	11	0	2	0	1	0	14	0
Leeds United	1981–82	First Division	18	2	2	1	1	0	21	3
Leeds United	1982–83	Second Division	0	0	1	0	0	0	1	0
Leeds United	1983–84	Second Division	25	0	3	0	0	0	28	0
Leeds United	1984–85	Second Division	31	0	1	0	0	0	32	0
Leeds United	1985–86	Second Division	30	0	1	0	3	0	34	0
Leeds United	Total		134	3	11	1	7	0	152	4
Bristol City	1986–87	Third Division	12	2	1	0	4	0	17	2
Port Vale	1986–87	Third Division	27	1	0	0	0	0	27	1
Port Vale	1987–88	Third Division	11	2	4	1	3	0	18	3
Port Vale	Total		38	3	4	1	3	0	45	4
Career total			292	16	21	2	24	1	337	19

A. The "Other" column constitutes appearances and goals in the League Cup, Football League Trophy, English Football League play-offs and Full Members' Cup.
