= Michael Cole (footballer, born 1966) =

English footballer

Personal information
- Full name: Michael Wade Cole
- Date of birth: 3 September 1966 (age 60)
- Place of birth: Hillingdon, England
- Height: 5 ft 11 in (1.80 m)
- Position: Forward

Youth career
- Ipswich Town

Senior career*
Years	Team	Apps	(Gls)
1984–1988	Ipswich Town	38	(3)
1988	→ Port Vale (loan)	4	(1)
1988–1991	Fulham	48	(4)
- Chelmsford City
Total		90+	(8+)
- * Club domestic league appearances and goals

Michael Wade Cole (born 3 September 1966) is an English former footballer who played for Ipswich Town, Port Vale, Fulham, and Chelmsford City in the 1980s and 1990s. A forward, he scored eight goals in 90 league games in a seven-year career in the Football League.

== Career ==
Cole began his career at Ipswich Town, who finished 17th in the First Division in 1984–85 under Bobby Ferguson's stewardship. The "Blues" were then relegated in 1985–86, just one point behind the safety mark set by Leicester City. They reached the Second Division play-offs in 1986–87, where they were beaten by Charlton Athletic at the semi-final stage. New boss John Duncan dropped Cole from the first-team and led the club to eighth position in 1987–88. Cole spent four weeks on loan at John Rudge's Port Vale from January to February 1988. He played four Third Division and three FA Cup games for the "Valiants", and scored one goal in a 3–2 win over York City at Bootham Crescent on 6 February. He returned to Ipswich from Vale Park, only to move permanently to Fulham. He had scored three goals in 38 league games during his time at Portman Road. Ray Lewington's "Cottagers" reached the Third Division play-offs in 1988–89 but were comfortably beaten by Bristol Rovers at the semi-final stage. However, they dropped to one point and one place above the relegation zone in 1989–90. They again struggled in 1990–91 under Alan Dicks's stewardship, finishing two points and one place above the relegation zone. Cole scored four goals in 48 league games in his three seasons at Craven Cottage. He later played Conference football for Chelmsford City.

== Career statistics ==
Appearances and goals by club, season and competition
Club	Season	League			FA Cup		Other		Total	
Club	Season	Division	Apps	Goals	Apps	Goals	Apps	Goals	Apps	Goals
Ipswich Town	1984–85	First Division	2	0	0	0	0	0	2	0
Ipswich Town	1985–86	First Division	18	1	1	0	3	3	22	4
Ipswich Town	1986–87	Second Division	16	2	1	0	3	0	20	2
Ipswich Town	1987–88	Second Division	2	0	0	0	0	0	2	0
Ipswich Town	Total		38	3	2	0	6	3	46	6
Port Vale (loan)	1987–88	Third Division	4	1	3	0	1	0	8	1
Fulham	1987–88	Third Division	9	1	0	0	0	0	9	1
Fulham	1988–89	Third Division	36	3	0	0	4	0	40	3
Fulham	1989–90	Third Division	1	0	0	0	0	0	1	0
Fulham	1990–91	Third Division	2	0	0	0	1	0	3	0
Fulham	Total		48	4	0	0	5	0	53	4
