= 1987–88 Port Vale F.C. season =

Port Vale F.C.
1987–88 season
- Chairman: Bill Bell
- Manager: John Rudge
- Stadium: Vale Park
- Football League Third Division: 11th (65 points)
- FA Cup: Fifth Round (eliminated by Watford)
- League Cup: First Round (eliminated by Northampton Town)
- Associate Members' Cup: First Round (eliminated by Torquay United)
- Player of the Year: Ray Walker
- Top goalscorer: League: Darren Beckford (9); All: Darren Beckford, David Riley (10 each)
- Highest home attendance: 22,483 vs. Watford, 20 February 1988
- Lowest home attendance: 2,176 vs. Exeter City, 26 October 1987
- Average home league attendance: 3,847
- Biggest win: 5–0 vs. Doncaster Rovers, 2 April 1988
- Biggest defeat: 0–4 (twice)
Home colours	Third colours

The 1987–88 season was Port Vale's 76th season of football in the English Football League, and second-successive (17th overall) season in the Third Division. Under manager John Rudge and newly-appointed chairman Bill Bell, the club navigated a turbulent season, ultimately finishing 11th with 65 points, firmly mid-table.

The sale of prolific striker Andy Jones for a then‑club record fee of £350,000 temporarily derailed the side, but reinvestment in players such as Darren Beckford, David Riley, and Simon Mills helped steady the ship. Vale enjoyed a notable cup run, highlighted by a famous 2–1 victory over top-flight Tottenham Hotspur in the Fourth Round of the FA Cup, before bowing out in a replay to Watford in the Fifth Round. However, they suffered early exits in both the League Cup and the Associate Members' Cup, going out in the First Round of each competition.

Darren Beckford and David Riley finished as joint top scorers, with 10 goals each across all competitions. Ray Walker was a standout performer, earning the club's Player of the Year award and a place in the PFA Third Division Team of the Year. Attendances varied dramatically, with a high of 22,483 for the FA Cup tie against Watford and a low of 2,176 for the league match against Exeter City, averaging 3,847 over the season.

Despite the mid-season upheaval following Andy Jones's departure, Vale recuperated through shrewd signings and a FA Cup run to maintain stability in the Third Division.

== Overview ==
=== Third Division ===
The pre-season saw Russell Bromage traded to Bristol City in exchange for Lawrie Pearson and £25,000. Jon Bowden was also sold to Wrexham for £12,500. The club also announced a new sponsorship deal with ABC Minolta, whilst the English Football League announced that midweek games would be played on Monday nights instead of Tuesday nights. John Rudge bought Darren Beckford from Manchester City for £15,000.

The season began with Andy Jones scoring all four goals in his 100th appearance for the club to beat Aldershot by four goals to two. With Pearson performing poorly, Darren Hughes was signed from Brighton & Hove Albion for a £10,000 fee. Paul Smith was also offloaded to non-League side Lincoln City for £40,000. Vale then won three consecutive games to go top of the table. The team won three consecutive games to go top of the table on 14 September, concluding with a 4–1 win over Southend United. After goal machine Andy Jones was sold to First Division club Charlton Athletic for £350,000 – a sale Rudge likened to 'cutting off my right arm' – Vale slid down the table. Alex Williams was also forced to retire with a back injury, leading to the return of a fit-again Mark Grew in goal. More injuries came as Chris Banks had his nose broken after a reserve team match at Barnsley when he was attacked by a gang of youths whilst waiting at a fish and chip shop. Alan Webb then suffered second-degree burns at Preston North End's plastic pitch at Deepdale.

In October, Rudge tried to replace Jones when he signed striker David Riley from Nottingham Forest for £20,000. Despite a good start, Riley soon entered a goal drought, as Vale went twelve league games without a win (including eight defeats). Robbie Earle missed much of this period with a hernia injury. In November, 26-year-old defender Kevin Steggles was signed from West Bromwich Albion for 'a small fee' to replace the still-injured Webb. More signings were made with former England international Peter Barnes arriving on loan from Manchester City, and 'hard-working' Simon Mills purchased from York City for £35,000. Barnes made his debut in a 4–0 loss at Mansfield Town on 20 December. Vale then found themselves sixth from the bottom after losing 3–1 at struggling Grimsby Town eight days later.

Rumours of a Rudge exit from Vale Park came after Alan Oakes quit in protest after being demoted to youth coach, and 'taskmaster' Mike Pejic was promoted in his place. Nevertheless, he signed winger Gary Ford from Leicester City for £36,000, whilst Pearson had his contract cancelled by mutual consent. Ford made his debut in a "bitterly disappointing" 1–0 defeat to Chesterfield. Michael Cole also arrived on loan from Ipswich Town. Rudge switched from a formation of 4–4–2 to 4–3–3 and only one defeat followed in the next 13 league games. As Barnes returned to Manchester, Richard O'Kelly was transferred to Walsall. Cole was replaced by another loanee in 19-year-old Dean Holdsworth (from Watford), who found greater success with Vale. However, Gary Hamson was forced to retire through injury.

On 13 February, Vale won 2–0 at home to Grimsby Town despite Ray Walker being sent off for stamping on a Grimsby defender's head – he was later fined £150 for bringing the game into disrepute. On 26 March, the team recorded a 2–1 victory over third-placed Walsall, and then thrashed Doncaster Rovers with five goals without reply the following week. A 5–0 win over Doncaster Rovers on 2 April helped the Vale into tenth place, giving Vale a faint hope of reaching the play-offs. Vale ended the season poorly however, winning just two of their final nine games.

They finished in eleventh place with 65 points, ten points short of play-off contenders Bristol City. Top-scorers Beckford and Riley had managed ten goals each, just four more than Jones had done in his eight games. Ray Walker was honoured with the club's Player of the Year award and was selected for the PFA's Third Division Team of the Year.

=== Finances ===
On the financial side, the cup run and sale of Jones had raised a record profit of £410,239. Match receipts had increased by 67% to £380,387, whilst advertising and broadcast revenues had more than doubled to £157,861. The wage bill had also fallen to £367,836. Three players were given free transfers at the season's end: Kevin Steggles (Bury Town), Chris Banks (Exeter City), and Paul Maguire (Northwich Victoria).

=== Cup competitions ===
In the FA Cup, Vale put in their 'worst away performance of the season' in a 2–2 draw at Prenton Park. They managed to beat Tranmere Rovers 3–1 in the replay in Burslem. A 'splendid' performance then defeated Notts County 2–0. They overcame non-League Macclesfield Town with a lunging headed goal from Kevin Finney booking a fourth round home tie with Tottenham Hotspur after Macclesfield had come close to taking the lead when John Askey hit the post in the first half. Ground improvements increased Vale Park's capacity, though a watered-down pitch persuaded "Spurs" boss Terry Venables to leave star man Osvaldo Ardiles on the bench. Despite this, TV pundit Jimmy Greaves reckoned that "The only trouble Spurs will have at Port Vale, is finding the place." As it happened, 20,045 turned up to witness a 'famous' 2–1 victory. The "Valiants" were in 'another gear' as Ray Walker nailed a 'stunning' 25 yards (23 m) strike and Phil Sproson scored the second vital goal. The club received £80,000 for the game from the BBC, with the match also broadcast on radio in Australia. The fourth round held Watford, and 22,483 turned up for the original goalless tie in Stoke-on-Trent (the highest Vale Park attendance since the visit of Liverpool in 1964). Grew received a lot of praise for his clean sheet performance. A further £87,699 was taken from the game. At the replay three days later at Vicarage Road, Vale were eliminated 2–0, though Vale were delighted with their £175,000 winning cup run.

In the League Cup, 3,460 saw Vale's opening tie with Northampton Town fail 'to produce the passion of a schoolyard kickabout', though both sides had two players sent off in the 2–0 defeat. Vale were then thumped 4–0 at Sixfields to exit the tournament 6–0 on aggregate.

In the Associate Members' Cup, Fourth Division strugglers Newport County beat the Vale 2–0 at Somerton Park, though a 2–0 home win over Exeter City took the Vale through the group stage. They were then eliminated by Torquay United at Plainmoor with a 1–0 loss.

== Results ==
=== Football League Third Division ===
==== League table ====
Pos	Team	Pld	W	D	L	GF	GA	GD	Pts
9	Fulham	46	19	9	18	69	60	+9	66
10	Blackpool	46	17	14	15	71	62	+9	65
11	Port Vale	46	18	11	17	58	56	+2	65
12	Brentford	46	16	14	16	53	59	−6	62
13	Gillingham	46	14	17	15	77	61	+16	59

Rules for classification: 1) Points; 2) Goal difference; 3) Goals scored

==== Results by matchday ====
Round	1	2	3	4	5	6	7	8	9	10	11	12	13	14	15	16	17	18	19	20	21	22	23	24	25	26	27	28	29	30	31	32	33	34	35	36	37	38	39	40	41	42	43	44	45	46
Ground	H	H	A	H	A	H	H	A	H	A	A	H	H	A	H	A	A	H	A	H	A	H	A	A	H	A	A	A	H	H	A	A	H	H	H	H	A	H	A	A	H	A	H	H	A	H
Result	W	D	L	W	W	W	D	L	W	L	L	W	W	L	D	L	D	D	L	L	L	D	L	L	L	W	D	W	W	W	L	W	W	D	W	W	W	D	L	L	D	L	W	L	W	D
Position	2	11	13	13	9	1	7	11	2	10	12	9	4	9	9	13	13	13	14	15	17	17	19	19	19	18	18	16	16	16	17	15	14	13	13	12	10	10	10	11	11	13	10	12	11	11
Points	3	4	4	7	10	13	14	14	17	17	17	20	23	23	24	24	25	26	26	26	26	27	27	27	27	30	31	34	37	40	40	43	46	47	50	53	56	57	57	57	58	58	61	61	64	65

Source: Statto
A = Away; H = Home; W = Win; D = Draw; L = Loss

==== Matches ====
15 August 1987 1	Port Vale	4–2	Aldershot	Burslem
	Jones (pen.)	Report		Stadium: Vale Park; Attendance: 3,160

29 August 1987 2	Port Vale	0–0	Rotherham United	Burslem
		Report		Stadium: Vale Park; Attendance: 2,895

31 August 1987 3	Bristol City	1–0	Port Vale	Ashton Gate, Bristol
		Report		Stadium: Ashton Gate; Attendance: 8,716

5 September 1987 4	Port Vale	2–1	York City	Burslem
	Jones; Harper	Report		Stadium: Vale Park; Attendance: 2,711

12 September 1987 5	Chesterfield	1–3	Port Vale	Chesterfield, Derbyshire
		Report	Earle; Jones; O'Kelly	Stadium: Saltergate; Attendance: 2,406

14 September 1987 6	Port Vale	4–1	Southend United	Burslem
	Maguire; Walker; Harper	Report		Stadium: Vale Park; Attendance: 3,670

19 September 1987 7	Port Vale	1–1	Fulham	Burslem
	Maguire (pen.)	Report		Stadium: Vale Park; Attendance: 3,894

26 September 1987 8	Northampton Town	1–0	Port Vale	Northampton
15:00 BST	Chard	Report		Stadium: County Cricket Ground; Attendance: 5,072; Referee: Colin Downey

28 September 1987 9	Port Vale	2–0	Brighton & Hove Albion	Burslem
	Beckford; Hughes	Report		Stadium: Vale Park; Attendance: 3,789

3 October 1987 10	Brentford	1–0	Port Vale	Brentford, West London
	Sinton	Report		Stadium: Griffin Park; Attendance: 4,007

10 October 1987 11	Preston North End	3–2	Port Vale	Preston, Lancashire
		Report	Walker	Stadium: Deepdale; Attendance: 6,375

17 October 1987 12	Port Vale	1–0	Bury	Burslem
	Beckford	Report		Stadium: Vale Park; Attendance: 3,235

19 October 1987 13	Port Vale	2–1	Bristol Rovers	Burslem
	Maguire (pen.); Riley	Report		Stadium: Vale Park; Attendance: 3,598

24 October 1987 14	Walsall	2–1	Port Vale	Walsall
		Report	Riley	Stadium: Fellows Park; Attendance: 6,083

31 October 1987 15	Port Vale	0–0	Gillingham	Burslem
		Report		Stadium: Vale Park; Attendance: 3,495

4 November 1987 16	Chester City	1–0	Port Vale	Chester
	Rimmer (pen.)	Report		Stadium: Sealand Road; Attendance: 2,825

7 November 1987 17	Doncaster Rovers	1–1	Port Vale	Doncaster
		Report	Sproson	Stadium: Belle Vue; Attendance: 1,365

22 November 1987 18	Port Vale	0–0	Blackpool	Burslem
		Report		Stadium: Vale Park; Attendance: 3,594

28 November 1987 19	Sunderland	2–1	Port Vale	Sunderland
	Gates 19'; MacPhail 38'	Report	Riley 73'	Stadium: Roker Park; Attendance: 15,655; Referee: David Allison

12 December 1987 20	Port Vale	1–3	Notts County	Burslem
	Riley	Report		Stadium: Vale Park; Attendance: 3,358

20 December 1987 21	Mansfield Town	4–0	Port Vale	Mansfield
	Kent	Report		Stadium: Field Mill; Attendance: 3,173

26 December 1987 22	Port Vale	1–1	Northampton Town	Burslem
15:00 GMT	Hamson (pen.)	Report	Singleton	Stadium: Vale Park; Attendance: 4,446

28 December 1987 23	Grimsby Town	3–1	Port Vale	Cleethorpes
		Report	Hamson	Stadium: Blundell Park; Attendance: 2,941

1 January 1988 24	Rotherham United	1–0	Port Vale	Rotherham
		Report		Stadium: Millmoor; Attendance: 3,911

2 January 1988 25	Port Vale	0–1	Chesterfield	Burslem
		Report		Stadium: Vale Park; Attendance: 3,495

16 January 1988 26	Fulham	1–2	Port Vale	Fulham, West London
		Report	Mills; Riley	Stadium: Craven Cottage; Attendance: 3,792

22 January 1988 27	Southend United	3–3	Port Vale	Southend-on-Sea
		Report	Riley; Ford; Mills	Stadium: Roots Hall; Attendance: 3,038

6 February 1988 28	York City	2–3	Port Vale	York
		Report	Cole; Sproson; Mills	Stadium: Bootham Crescent; Attendance: 2,420

13 February 1988 29	Port Vale	2–0	Grimsby Town	Burslem
	Earle	Report		Stadium: Vale Park; Attendance: 3,417

27 February 1988 30	Port Vale	1–0	Brentford	Burslem
	Beckford	Report		Stadium: Vale Park; Attendance: 3,876

2 March 1988 31	Brighton & Hove Albion	2–0	Port Vale	Hove
		Report		Stadium: Goldstone Ground; Attendance: 7,303

5 March 1988 32	Bury	0–1	Port Vale	Bury, Greater Manchester
		Report	Beckford	Stadium: Gigg Lane; Attendance: 2,635

12 March 1988 33	Port Vale	3–2	Preston North End	Burslem
	Sproson; Walker (og.)	Report		Stadium: Vale Park; Attendance: 4,647

19 March 1988 34	Gillingham	0–0	Port Vale	Gillingham, Kent
		Report		Stadium: Priestfield Stadium; Attendance: 3,367

26 March 1988 35	Port Vale	2–1	Walsall	Burslem
	Holdsworth; Riley	Report		Stadium: Vale Park; Attendance: 6,347

2 April 1988 36	Port Vale	5–0	Doncaster Rovers	Burslem
	Beckford (pen.); Riley; Walker	Report		Stadium: Vale Park; Attendance: 3,680

4 April 1988 37	Blackpool	1–2	Port Vale	Blackpool
	Taylor	Report	Ford; Beckford	Stadium: Bloomfield Road; Attendance: 5,516

9 April 1988 38	Port Vale	1–1	Chester City	Burslem
	Holdsworth	Report	Lundon	Stadium: Vale Park; Attendance: 4,278

12 April 1988 39	Wigan Athletic	2–0	Port Vale	Wigan
	Thompson; Campbell	Report		Stadium: Springfield Park; Attendance: 4,438

15 April 1988 40	Aldershot	3–0	Port Vale	Aldershot
		Report		Stadium: Recreation Ground; Attendance: 2,257

18 April 1988 41	Port Vale	1–1	Bristol City	Burslem
	Mills	Report		Stadium: Vale Park; Attendance: 2,671

23 April 1988 42	Bristol Rovers	1–0	Port Vale	Bath, Somerset
		Report		Stadium: Twerton Park; Attendance: 3,280

25 April 1988 43	Port Vale	2–1	Wigan Athletic	Burslem
	Ford; Walker	Report	Hughes (og.)	Stadium: Vale Park; Attendance: 3,044

30 April 1988 44	Port Vale	0–1	Sunderland	Burslem
		Report	Gates 79'	Stadium: Vale Park; Attendance: 7,569; Referee: Keith Cooper

2 May 1988 45	Notts County	1–2	Port Vale	Nottingham
		Report	Beckford; Earle	Stadium: Meadow Lane; Attendance: 7,702

7 May 1988 46	Port Vale	1–1	Mansfield Town	Burslem
	Mills	Report	Owen	Stadium: Vale Park; Attendance: 3,617

=== FA Cup ===
14 November 1987 R1	Tranmere Rovers	2–2	Port Vale	Prenton
		Report	Maguire (og.)	Stadium: Prenton Park; Attendance: 4,035

16 November 1987 Replay	Port Vale	3–1	Tranmere Rovers	Burslem
	O'Kelly; Hamson; Riley	Report		Stadium: Vale Park; Attendance: 4,097

5 December 1987 R2	Port Vale	2–0	Notts County	Burslem
	Beckford; Sproson	Report		Stadium: Vale Park; Attendance: 5,039

10 January 1988 R3	Port Vale	1–0	Macclesfield Town	Burslem
	Finney	Report		Stadium: Vale Park; Attendance: 10,808

30 January 1988 R4	Port Vale	2–1	Tottenham Hotspur	Burslem
	Walker; Sproson	Report	Ruddock	Stadium: Vale Park; Attendance: 20,045

20 February 1988 R5	Port Vale	0–0	Watford	Burslem
		Report		Stadium: Vale Park; Attendance: 22,483

23 February 1988 Replay	Watford	2–0	Port Vale	Watford
	Senior; Porter	Report		Stadium: Vicarage Road; Attendance: 18,539

=== League Cup ===
17 August 1987 R1 1st Leg	Port Vale	0–1	Northampton Town	Burslem
19:30 BST		Report	Longhurst	Stadium: Vale Park; Attendance: 3,460

2 September 1987 R1 2nd Leg	Northampton Town	4–0 (5–0 agg.)	Port Vale	Northampton
19:30 BST	McPherson; Morley	Report		Stadium: County Cricket Ground; Attendance: 4,748; Referee: Terry Holbrook

=== Associate Members' Cup ===
13 October 1987 Preliminary	Newport County	2–0	Port Vale	Newport, Wales
	P. Giles; Gibbins	Report		Stadium: Somerton Park; Attendance: 569

26 October 1987 Preliminary	Port Vale	2–0	Exeter City	Burslem
	O'Kelly; Riley	Report		Stadium: Vale Park; Attendance: 2,176

19 January 1988 R1	Torquay United	1–0	Port Vale	Torquay
		Report		Stadium: Plainmoor; Attendance: 2,624

== Squad statistics ==
=== Appearances and goals ===
Key to positions: GK – Goalkeeper; DF – Defender; MF – Midfielder; FW – Forward

No.	Pos	Nat	Player	Total		Third Division		FA Cup		League Cup		Associate Members' Cup	
No.	Pos	Nat	Player	Apps	Goals	Apps	Goals	Apps	Goals	Apps	Goals	Apps	Goals
	GK	(England) ENG	Mark Grew	50	0	41	0	6	0	0	0	3	0
	DF	(England) ENG	Chris Banks	21	0	14	0	2	0	2	0	3	0
	DF	(England) ENG	Bob Hazell	52	0	43	0	6	0	1	0	2	0
	DF	(England) ENG	Darren Hughes	53	1	43	1	7	0	0	0	3	0
	DF	(England) ENG	Simon Mills	19	5	19	5	0	0	0	0	0	0
	DF	(England) ENG	Phil Sproson	54	5	44	3	7	2	2	0	1	0
	DF	(England) ENG	Kevin Steggles	26	0	20	0	5	0	0	0	1	0
	DF	(England) ENG	Alan Webb	29	0	26	0	1	0	2	0	0	0
	MF	(England) ENG	Steve Davies	6	0	6	0	0	0	0	0	0	0
	MF	(Jamaica) JAM	Robbie Earle	30	4	25	4	4	0	1	0	0	0
	MF	(England) ENG	Kevin Finney	22	1	15	0	4	1	0	0	3	0
	MF	(England) ENG	Gary Ford	28	3	23	3	4	0	0	0	1	0
	MF	(England) ENG	Steve Harper	25	2	21	2	0	0	2	0	2	0
	MF	(Scotland) SCO	Paul Maguire	38	5	28	4	5	1	2	0	3	0
	MF	(England) ENG	Andy Porter	9	0	6	0	1	0	1	0	1	0
	MF	(England) ENG	Ray Walker	53	7	42	6	7	1	1	0	3	0
	FW	(England) ENG	Darren Beckford	50	10	40	9	6	1	2	0	2	0
	FW	(England) ENG	Dean Holdsworth	6	2	6	2	0	0	0	0	0	0
	FW	(England) ENG	David Riley	43	10	34	8	7	1	0	0	2	1
Players who featured but departed the club during the season:
	GK	(Wales) WAL	Alan Simons	2	0	1	0	1	0	0	0	0	0
	GK	(England) ENG	Alex Williams	6	0	4	0	0	0	2	0	0	0
	DF	(England) ENG	Lawrie Pearson	6	0	3	0	0	0	2	0	1	0
	MF	(England) ENG	Gary Hamson	18	3	11	2	4	1	2	0	1	0
	MF	(England) ENG	Paul Smith	3	0	2	0	0	0	1	0	0	0
	FW	(England) ENG	Peter Barnes	3	0	3	0	0	0	0	0	0	0
	FW	(England) ENG	Michael Cole	8	1	4	1	3	0	0	0	1	0
	FW	(Wales) WAL	Andy Jones	8	6	6	6	0	0	2	0	0	0
	FW	(England) ENG	Richard O'Kelly	22	3	16	1	3	1	1	0	2	1
	FW	(England) ENG	Brian Palgrave	1	0	0	0	0	0	0	0	1	0

=== Top scorers ===
Place	Position	Nation	Name	Third Division	FA Cup	League Cup	Associate Members' Cup	Total
1	FW	England	Darren Beckford	9	1	0	0	10
–	FW	England	David Riley	8	1	0	1	10
3	MF	England	Ray Walker	6	1	0	0	7
4	FW	Wales	Andy Jones	6	0	0	0	6
5	DF	England	Simon Mills	5	0	0	0	5
–	MF	Scotland	Paul Maguire	4	1	0	0	5
–	DF	England	Phil Sproson	3	2	0	0	5
8	MF	Jamaica	Robbie Earle	4	0	0	0	4
9	MF	England	Gary Ford	3	0	0	0	3
–	MF	England	Gary Hamson	2	1	0	0	3
–	FW	England	Richard O'Kelly	1	1	0	1	3
12	MF	England	Steve Harper	2	0	0	0	2
–	FW	England	Dean Holdsworth	2	0	0	0	2
14	FW	England	Michael Cole	1	0	0	0	1
–	DF	England	Darren Hughes	1	0	0	0	1
–	MF	England	Kevin Finney	0	1	0	0	1
–		–	Own goals	1	1	0	0	2
			TOTALS	58	10	0	2	70

== Transfers ==
=== Transfers in ===
Date from	Position	Nationality	Name	From	Fee	Ref.
August 1987	DF	ENG	Lawrie Pearson	Bristol City	Exchange	
September 1987	DF	ENG	Darren Hughes	Brighton & Hove Albion	£5,000	
October 1987	FW	ENG	Brian Palgrave	Walsall	Trial	
19 October 1987	FW	ENG	David Riley	Nottingham Forest	£20,000	
28 November 1987	DF	ENG	Kevin Steggles	West Bromwich Albion	'small'	
December 1987	MF	ENG	Steve Davies	Congleton Town	Free transfer	
24 December 1987	DF	ENG	Simon Mills	York City	£35,000	
31 December 1987	MF	ENG	Gary Ford	Leicester City	£35,000	

=== Transfers out ===
Date from	Position	Nationality	Name	To	Fee	Ref.
26 September 1987	FW	WAL	Andy Jones	Charlton Athletic	£350,000	
September 1987	MF	ENG	Paul Smith	Lincoln City	£40,000	
September 1987	GK	ENG	Alex Williams	Retired		
January 1988	FW	ENG	Richard O'Kelly	Walsall	Free transfer	
January 1988	FW	ENG	Brian Palgrave	Nuneaton Borough	Trial ended	
January 1988	DF	ENG	Lawrie Pearson	Whitley Bay	Mutual consent	
March 1988	MF	ENG	Gary Hamson	Retired		
March 1988	GK	WAL	Alan Simons		Released	
May 1988	MF	SCO	Paul Maguire	Northwich Victoria	Free transfer	
May 1988	DF	ENG	Kevin Steggles	Bury Town	Free transfer	
June 1988	DF	ENG	Chris Banks	Exeter City	Free transfer	

=== Loans in ===
Date from	Position	Nationality	Name	From	Date to	Ref.
2 September 1987	DF	ENG	Darren Hughes	Brighton & Hove Albion	September 1987	
19 December 1987	MF	ENG	Peter Barnes	Manchester City	1988	
15 January 1988	FW	ENG	Michael Cole	Ipswich Town	29 January 1988	
18 March 1988	FW	ENG	Dean Holdsworth	Watford	End of season	
