= Kevin Finney =

English footballer

Personal information
- Full name: Kevin Finney
- Date of birth: 19 October 1969 (age 57)
- Place of birth: Newcastle-under-Lyme, England
- Height: 6 ft 0 in (1.83 m)
- Position: Midfielder

Youth career
- 1986–1987: Port Vale

Senior career*
Years	Team	Apps	(Gls)
1987–1991	Port Vale	37	(1)
1991–1993	Lincoln City	37	(2)
1993–1994	Leek Town	9	(1)
1994	Stafford Rangers		
1994–1998	Audley		
- * Club domestic league appearances and goals

Kevin Finney (born 19 October 1969) is an English former footballer who played as a midfielder for Port Vale, Lincoln City, Leek Town, and Stafford Rangers.

== Career ==
=== Port Vale ===
Finney came up through the Port Vale youth team after being scouted by Ray Williams at the age of 14, remaining at the club despite interest from Ipswich Town. He started a two-year YTS scheme in May 1986. Then he signed as a professional in May 1987. He featured 22 times in the 1987–88 campaign, and scored the only goal of the game against Macclesfield Town to book the "Valiants" an FA Cup tie with First Division giants Tottenham Hotspur. This goal was reported to have kept manager John Rudge in his job, who went on to become the club's most successful ever manager. He went on to be named as the club's Young Player of the Season.

However, Rudge used Finney mainly as a substitute in 17 games in the 1988–89 season. He scored his first league goal on the last day of the Third Division season: a 2–1 win over Fulham at Craven Cottage on 13 May. He appeared as a substitute for Andy Porter in the 1–0 win over Bristol Rovers at Vale Park on 3 June, in the second leg of the play-off final. However, his first-team opportunities became more limited in the Second Division, and he featured just nine times in the 1989–90 season. He became frustrated with the lack of playing opportunities. He was found guilty of being drunk and disorderly in June 1990 and sent back from a pre-season training camp at the University of Stirling for breaking curfew in August 1990, along with John Jeffers, Paul Millar and Ronnie Jepson. He appeared just once, in the League Cup, in the 1990–91 campaign. He had a transfer request rejected in December 1989, though he was handed a free transfer to Lincoln City in May 1991.

=== Lincoln City ===
Lincoln won his signature ahead of interest from Preston North End and Darlington, with manager Steve Thompson having tracked him for some years. The "Imps" posted a tenth-place finish in the Fourth Division in 1991–92, before finishing outside the play-offs on goal difference in 1992–93. He scored two goals in 37 league appearances during his two seasons at Sincil Bank.

=== Non-League ===
Finney then moved into non-League football, agreeing to a two-year contract with Northern Premier League side Leek Town, having rejected terms with Doncaster Rovers to return to his home in Audley as he had not enjoyed living away. His spell with the club would be short as having failed to command a regular place in the team, he moved to Stafford Rangers in December 1993. He was released by the Marston Road-based club at the end of the season. He moved on to join his local team Audley in the Midland Football League where he would remain until, at least, the end of the 1997–98 season.

== Career statistics ==
Appearances and goals by club, season and competition
Club	Season	League			FA Cup		Other		Total	
Club	Season	Division	Apps	Goals	Apps	Goals	Apps	Goals	Apps	Goals
Port Vale	1987–88	Third Division	15	0	4	1	3	0	22	1
Port Vale	1988–89	Third Division	14	1	0	0	3	0	17	1
Port Vale	1989–90	Second Division	8	0	0	0	1	0	9	0
Port Vale	1990–91	Second Division	0	0	0	0	1	0	1	0
Port Vale	Total		37	1	4	1	8	0	49	2
Lincoln City	1991–92	Fourth Division	23	2	1	0	5	0	29	2
Lincoln City	1992–93	Third Division	14	0	0	0	4	1	18	1
Lincoln City	Total		46	2	5	0	13	1	64	3
Leek Town	1993–94	Northern Premier League; Premier Division	9	1	4	0	4	0	17	1

== Honours ==
Port Vale

- Football League Third Division play-offs: 1989
