= 1990–91 Port Vale F.C. season =

Port Vale F.C.
1990–91 season
- Chairman: Bill Bell
- Manager: John Rudge
- Stadium: Vale Park
- Football League Second Division: 15th (57 points)
- FA Cup: Fourth Round (eliminated by Manchester City)
- League Cup: Second Round (eliminated by Oxford United)
- Full Members' Cup: First Round (eliminated by Notts County)
- Player of the Year: Ray Walker
- Top goalscorer: League: Darren Beckford (21); All: Darren Beckford (23)
- Highest home attendance: 19,132 vs. Manchester City, 26 January 1991
- Lowest home attendance: 5,265 vs. Oxford United, 24 September 1990
- Average home league attendance: 8,092
- Biggest win: 5–1 vs. Plymouth Argyle, 1 December 1990
- Biggest defeat: 0–4 vs. Middlesbrough, 9 April 1991
Home colours	Away colours

The 1990–91 season was Port Vale's 79th season of football in the English Football League, and second-successive (34th overall) season in the Second Division. For the first time since 1926–27 they played in a league above Potteries derby rivals Stoke City. Under manager John Rudge and chairman Bill Bell, the Valiants achieved a solid 15th‑place finish with 57 points, indicating a stable mid‑table performance.

Their cup exploits were modest yet respectable: reaching the Fourth Round of the FA Cup (where they were knocked out by Manchester City), exiting in the Second Round of the League Cup at the hands of Oxford United, and seeing an early First Round departure in the Full Members' Cup, losing to Notts County. A highlight in the transfer market was the astute signing of Dutch midfielder Robin van der Laan for £80,000 — a move that exemplified Rudge's knack for unearthing underrated talent. Darren Beckford continued his scoring form, finishing as the club's top scorer with 21 league goals and 23 in all competitions, while Ray Walker earned the Player of the Year award.

Attendance figures reflected a passionate fan base: a season‑high of 19,132 saw Vale face off against Manchester City in the FA Cup on 26 January 1991, while the lowest turnout of 5,265 occurred in the League Cup tie against Oxford United on 24 September 1990; the average home league attendance stood at 8,092. The team's biggest win came in a commanding 5–1 victory over Plymouth Argyle on 1 December 1990, contrasting with their heaviest loss, a 4–0 defeat to Middlesbrough on 9 April 1991.

Vale consolidated their place in the Second Division through signings, consistent goal-scoring from Beckford, and solid cup performances, laying a stable foundation for the seasons ahead.

== Overview ==
=== Second Division ===
The pre-season saw John Rudge follow up a recommendation by signing young Irish forward Derek Swan from Bohemians for £15,000. Meanwhile, more than £250,000 was taken in by the club from season-ticket sales. Much of this went on improving Vale Park, with 3,750 yellow and white seats fitted in the Railway Paddock and 1,121 seats added to the upper tier of the Bycars End. The Bycars End roof was removed for safety reasons, whilst a police box was constructed between the Railway Paddock and the Hamil End. Admission rates increased to £5 for a terrace place, £6 for a seat in the Paddock and £7 in the stand. Season tickets ranged between £75 and £105. With police bills set to spiral upwards, a record five-figure shirt sponsorship deal was struck with Kalamazoo (a business systems company). A 25,000 seater stadium was planned for Festival Park; however, Chairman Bill Bell was 'frightened to death by the cost', and the plans were binned.

The season opened with two defeats, though a 2–0 win over Leicester City on 1 September kick-started the Vale's campaign. A week later they beat Portsmouth 4–2 at Fratton Park. However, their 3–2 win over Middlesbrough was followed by seven league games without a win. Left-back Colin Gibson scored on his debut, having arrived on loan from Manchester United; whilst future-Nigerian international Reuben Agboola also arrived on loan from Sunderland. On 29 September, Vale fell to a 3–2 defeat at Hull City, with Andy Payton scoring the winning goal in the last minute. On 17 November, Vale won 1–0 at home to an Oldham Athletic side who were unbeaten in their 16 league games. The streak ended when Ray Walker and Darren Beckford found their scoring form, firing the club to five victories in seven games, including a 5–1 home win over Plymouth Argyle which Rudge described as "the sort of game that, as a forward, you never want to end because there were so many chances". On 15 December, Vale beat Oxford United after Beckford scored the only goal of the game, with Rudge saying his "goal was that of a £1m player". The Vale lost their form around Christmastime however. They remained in indifferent form until the end of the season. Rudge took in Nick Platnauer on loan from Notts County, though results failed to pick up.

On 19 January, Vale recorded a 3–2 home victory over Portsmouth to end a run of poor form. Guy Whittingham put the visitors ahead following a mistake from Trevor Wood, then Neil Aspin scored his first goal for the club to equalise. Former Valiant Mark Chamberlain assisted Whittingham for another goal before late goals from Dean Glover and Beckford won the game. In February, Ronnie Jepson was sold to Preston North End for £80,000, having previously been loaned out to Peterborough United. Gary West also spent much of the season away from Vale Park, spending time on loan at Gillingham and Lincoln City (signing permanently for Lincoln at the end of the season for a £25,000 fee). All of the money raised from Jepson's sale went on bringing Dutchman Robin van der Laan to Burslem from Wageningen. Right-back Paul West also arrived for a £3,800 fee from non-League Alcester Town. In March, Gary Ford and £80,000 were traded to Mansfield Town in exchange for Kevin Kent. Also of note during this spell was a hat-trick for Beckford in a 3–0 win over Blackburn Rovers on 9 March, and a run of four goals in the final four games for Robbie Earle. Vale won their first away game in four months on 23 March, beating Charlton Athletic 1–0 at Selhurst Park; Van der Laan scored the goal, whilst Grew played excellently in goal and Porter played well in the absence of the injured Jeffers. Striker Brian Mills made his debut in a final day win over Swindon Town, and would later be picked for the England squad for the 1991 FIFA World Youth Championship.

They finished in 15th place with 57 points, twelve points away from Middlesbrough in the play-offs, but nine points clear of relegated West Bromwich Albion. Beckford scored 23 goals in all competitions, whilst Earle contributed twelve goals.

=== Finances ===
The club's shirt sponsors were Kalamazoo.

=== Cup competitions ===
In the FA Cup, Vale advanced into the fourth round with a 2–1 victory over Fourth Division side Peterborough United amidst stormy conditions at Vale Park after Mick Halsall had put the visitors ahead on four minutes – Rudge said "it was a scrap, not a classic" as a Walker penalty and Beckford header secured the victory. In the next round, they lost at home to First Division Manchester City in front of a season-high crowd of 19,132.

In the League Cup, the "Valiants" faced Oxford United. A 2–0 defeat on the home leg meant they were eliminated after a goalless draw at the Manor Ground.

In the short-lived Full Members' Cup, Vale lost 1–0 to Notts County at Meadow Lane to exit the competition at the first stage.

== Results ==
=== Football League Second Division ===
==== League table ====
Pos	Team	Pld	W	D	L	GF	GA	GD	Pts
13	Bristol Rovers	46	15	13	18	56	59	−3	58
14	Ipswich Town	46	13	18	15	60	68	−8	57
15	Port Vale	46	15	12	19	56	64	−8	57
16	Charlton Athletic	46	13	17	16	57	61	−4	56
17	Portsmouth	46	14	11	21	58	70	−12	53

Rules for classification: 1) Points; 2) Goal difference; 3) Goals scored

==== Results by matchday ====
Round	1	2	3	4	5	6	7	8	9	10	11	12	13	14	15	16	17	18	19	20	21	22	23	24	25	26	27	28	29	30	31	32	33	34	35	36	37	38	39	40	41	42	43	44	45	46
Ground	A	H	H	A	H	H	A	A	H	H	A	A	H	H	A	A	H	A	H	H	H	A	A	H	A	H	A	A	H	A	A	H	A	H	H	A	H	A	H	A	A	H	A	A	H	H
Result	L	L	W	W	L	W	D	L	L	D	L	D	L	W	W	L	W	D	W	W	L	L	D	L	D	W	L	L	W	L	L	W	D	D	L	W	D	W	L	L	W	L	D	D	D	W
Position	24	24	12	9	15	7	9	13	13	14	15	15	16	17	15	18	15	13	10	8	10	12	12	12	15	14	15	16	15	15	16	14	15	15	16	16	16	15	15	16	15	15	16	17	16	15
Points	0	0	3	6	6	9	10	10	10	11	11	12	12	15	18	18	21	22	25	28	28	28	29	29	30	33	33	33	36	36	36	39	40	41	41	44	45	48	48	48	51	51	52	53	54	57

Source: Statto
A = Away; H = Home; W = Win; D = Draw; L = Loss

==== Matches ====
25 August 1990 1	Oxford United	5–2	Port Vale	Oxford
	Foster 8', 82'; Stein 25', 53'; Simpson 71' (pen.)	Report	Jeffers 36'; Earle 56'	Stadium: Manor Ground; Attendance: 4,837

28 August 1990 2	Port Vale	1–2	Wolverhampton Wanderers	Burslem
	Beckford 7' (pen.)	Report	Bellamy 23'; Bull 43'	Stadium: Vale Park; Attendance: 12,746; Referee: W Harrison

1 September 1990 3	Port Vale	2–0	Leicester City	Burslem
	Earle; Beckford	Report		Stadium: Vale Park; Attendance: 8,837

8 September 1990 4	Portsmouth	2–4	Port Vale	Portsmouth
	Aspinall (pen.); Kelly	Report	Beckford; Cross; Earle	Stadium: Fratton Park; Attendance: 8,835

15 September 1990 5	Port Vale	0–1	Newcastle United	Burslem
		Report	Quinn 66'	Stadium: Vale Park; Attendance: 10,040

17 September 1990 6	Port Vale	3–1	Middlesbrough	Burslem
	Beckford; Earle	Report	Russell	Stadium: Vale Park; Attendance: 7,880

22 September 1990 7	Barnsley	1–1	Port Vale	Barnsley
		Report	Beckford	Stadium: Oakwell; Attendance: 8,533

29 September 1990 8	Hull City	3–2	Port Vale	Kingston upon Hull
15:00 BST	Palin 4'; Payton 59', 90'	Report	Gibson; Cross	Stadium: Boothferry Park; Attendance: 5,185

1 October 1990 9	Port Vale	0–1	Notts County	Burslem
		Report		Stadium: Vale Park; Attendance: 7,723

6 October 1990 10	Port Vale	1–1	Charlton Athletic	Burslem
	Beckford	Report		Stadium: Vale Park; Attendance: 6,706

13 October 1990 11	Ipswich Town	3–0	Port Vale	Ipswich
		Report		Stadium: Portman Road; Attendance: 10,438

20 October 1990 12	Sheffield Wednesday	1–1	Port Vale	Owlerton
	Williams	Report	Gibson	Stadium: Hillsborough Stadium; Attendance: 24,527

22 October 1990 13	Port Vale	1–2	West Bromwich Albion	Burslem
	Walker (pen.)	Report		Stadium: Vale Park; Attendance: 8,824

27 October 1990 14	Port Vale	3–2	Bristol City	Burslem
	Walker (pen.); Beckford	Report	Smith (pen.); Allison	Stadium: Vale Park; Attendance: 7,451

3 November 1990 15	Swindon Town	1–2	Port Vale	Swindon
	Beckford 31' (og.)	Report	Ford 71'; Beckford 73'	Stadium: County Ground; Attendance: 8,364; Referee: R. Hamer

10 November 1990 16	Bristol Rovers	2–0	Port Vale	Bath, Somerset
		Report		Stadium: Twerton Park; Attendance: 5,661

17 November 1990 17	Port Vale	1–0	Oldham Athletic	Burslem
	Cross	Report		Stadium: Vale Park; Attendance: 11,384

23 November 1990 18	Blackburn Rovers	1–1	Port Vale	Blackburn
		Report	Walker (pen.)	Stadium: Ewood Park; Attendance: 8,061

1 December 1990 19	Port Vale	5–1	Plymouth Argyle	Burslem
	Beckford; Jeffers; Ford; Walker	Report	Ampadu	Stadium: Vale Park; Attendance: 6,717

15 December 1990 20	Port Vale	1–0	Oxford United	Burslem
	Beckford	Report		Stadium: Vale Park; Attendance: 5,953

22 December 1990 21	Port Vale	0–1	Brighton & Hove Albion	Burslem
		Report		Stadium: Vale Park; Attendance: 6,750

26 December 1990 22	Watford	2–1	Port Vale	Watford
	Penrice; Thomas	Report	Earle	Stadium: Vicarage Road; Attendance: 8,084

29 December 1990 23	West Ham United	0–0	Port Vale	Upton Park, London
		Report		Stadium: Boleyn Ground; Attendance: 23,603

1 January 1991 24	Port Vale	0–2	Millwall	Burslem
		Report		Stadium: Vale Park; Attendance: 8,418

12 January 1991 25	Leicester City	1–1	Port Vale	Leicester
	Oldfield	Report	Earle	Stadium: Filbert Street; Attendance: 9,307

19 January 1991 26	Port Vale	3–2	Portsmouth	Burslem
	Aspin; Glover; Beckford	Report	Whittingham	Stadium: Vale Park; Attendance: 6,314

2 February 1991 27	Newcastle United	2–0	Port Vale	Newcastle upon Tyne
	Quinn 4'; Peacock 73'	Report		Stadium: St James' Park; Attendance: 14,480

16 February 1991 28	Oldham Athletic	2–0	Port Vale	Oldham
		Report		Stadium: Boundary Park; Attendance: 12,907

23 February 1991 29	Port Vale	3–2	Bristol Rovers	Burslem
	Millar; Beckford; Walker (pen.)	Report		Stadium: Vale Park; Attendance: 7,166

26 February 1991 30	Wolverhampton Wanderers	3–1	Port Vale	Wolverhampton
	Bull 30', 42'; Mutch 70'	Report	Earle 20'	Stadium: Molineux Stadium; Attendance: 15,919; Referee: K Morton

2 March 1991 31	Plymouth Argyle	2–0	Port Vale	Plymouth
	Turner	Report		Stadium: Home Park; Attendance: 5,145

9 March 1991 32	Port Vale	3–0	Blackburn Rovers	Burslem
	Beckford	Report		Stadium: Vale Park; Attendance: 7,004

12 March 1991 33	Notts County	1–1	Port Vale	Nottingham
		Report	Beckford	Stadium: Meadow Lane; Attendance: 6,305

16 March 1991 34	Port Vale	0–0	Hull City	Burslem
15:00 GMT		Report		Stadium: Vale Park; Attendance: 6,103

18 March 1991 35	Port Vale	1–2	Ipswich Town	Burslem
	van der Laan	Report		Stadium: Vale Park; Attendance: 5,820

23 March 1991 36	Charlton Athletic	0–1	Port Vale	Charlton, London
		Report	van der Laan	Stadium: The Valley; Attendance: 5,225

30 March 1991 37	Port Vale	0–0	Watford	Burslem
		Report		Stadium: Vale Park; Attendance: 6,661

3 April 1991 38	Brighton & Hove Albion	1–2	Port Vale	Hove
		Report	Beckford van der Laan	Stadium: Goldstone Ground; Attendance: 9,733

6 April 1991 39	Port Vale	0–1	West Ham United	Burslem
		Report	Bishop	Stadium: Vale Park; Attendance: 9,658

9 April 1991 40	Middlesbrough	4–0	Port Vale	Middlesbrough
	Baird; Ripley; Russell; Wark	Report		Stadium: Ayresome Park; Attendance: 15,063

13 April 1991 41	Millwall	1–2	Port Vale	New Cross, Lewisham
		Report	van der Laan; Beckford	Stadium: The Den; Attendance: 10,860

15 April 1991 42	Port Vale	0–1	Barnsley	Burslem
		Report		Stadium: Vale Park; Attendance: 6,939

27 April 1991 43	West Bromwich Albion	1–1	Port Vale	West Bromwich
		Report	Earle	Stadium: The Hawthorns; Attendance: 13,650

4 May 1991 44	Bristol City	1–1	Port Vale	Ashton Gate, Bristol
	Allison	Report	Earle	Stadium: Ashton Gate; Attendance: 11,555

6 May 1991 45	Port Vale	1–1	Sheffield Wednesday	Burslem
	Earle	Report	Hirst	Stadium: Vale Park; Attendance: 13,317

11 May 1991 46	Port Vale	3–1	Swindon Town	Burslem
	Earle 21'; Mills 29', 69'	Report	Viveash 40'	Stadium: Vale Park; Attendance: 7,713; Referee: R.L. Bigger

=== FA Cup ===
5 January 1991 R3	Port Vale	2–1	Peterborough United	Burslem
	Walker 44' (pen.); Beckford 81'	Report	Halsall 4'	Stadium: Vale Park; Attendance: 7,490; Referee: T. Fitzharris

26 January 1991 R4	Port Vale	1–2	Manchester City	Burslem
	Beckford	Report		Stadium: Vale Park; Attendance: 19,132; Referee: Jim Borrett

=== League Cup ===
24 September 1990 R2 1st Leg	Port Vale	0–2	Oxford United	Burslem
		Report	Foyle	Stadium: Vale Park; Attendance: 5,265

10 October 1990 R2 2nd Leg	Oxford United	0–0 (2–0 agg.)	Port Vale	Oxford
		Report		Stadium: Manor Ground; Attendance: 2,333

=== Full Members' Cup ===
20 November 1990 R1	Notts County	1–0	Port Vale	Nottingham
		Report		Stadium: Meadow Lane; Attendance: 2,320

== Squad statistics ==
=== Appearances and goals ===
Key to positions: GK – Goalkeeper; DF – Defender; MF – Midfielder; FW – Forward

No.	Pos	Nat	Player	Total		Second Division		FA Cup		League Cup		Full Members' Cup	
No.	Pos	Nat	Player	Apps	Goals	Apps	Goals	Apps	Goals	Apps	Goals	Apps	Goals
	GK	(England) ENG	Mark Grew	14	0	14	0	0	0	0	0	0	0
	GK	(Northern Ireland) NIR	Trevor Wood	37	0	32	0	2	0	2	0	1	0
	DF	(England) ENG	Neil Aspin	46	1	41	1	2	0	2	0	1	0
	DF	(England) ENG	Matt Booth	0	0	0	0	0	0	0	0	0	0
	DF	(England) ENG	Dean Glover	46	1	41	1	2	0	2	0	1	0
	DF	(England) ENG	Darren Hughes	18	0	17	0	0	0	1	0	0	0
	DF	(England) ENG	Simon Mills	45	0	41	0	1	0	2	0	1	0
	DF	(England) ENG	Tim Parkin	32	0	29	0	2	0	0	0	1	0
	DF	(England) ENG	Wayne Simpson	0	0	0	0	0	0	0	0	0	0
	DF	(England) ENG	Alan Webb	6	0	4	0	1	0	0	0	1	0
	DF	(England) ENG	Gary West	0	0	0	0	0	0	0	0	0	0
	DF	(England) ENG	Paul West	0	0	0	0	0	0	0	0	0	0
	MF	(Jamaica) JAM	Robbie Earle	37	11	35	11	2	0	0	0	0	0
	MF	(England) ENG	Kevin Finney	1	0	0	0	0	0	1	0	0	0
	MF	(England) ENG	John Jeffers	36	2	31	2	2	0	2	0	1	0
	MF	(England) ENG	Kevin Kent	11	0	11	0	0	0	0	0	0	0
	MF	(Northern Ireland) NIR	Paul Millar	18	1	17	1	0	0	0	0	1	0
	MF	(England) ENG	Andy Porter	44	0	40	0	1	0	2	0	1	0
	MF	(England) ENG	Glen Shepherd	0	0	0	0	0	0	0	0	0	0
	MF	(England) ENG	Ray Walker	50	7	45	6	2	1	2	0	1	0
	MF	(Netherlands) NED	Robin van der Laan	18	4	18	4	0	0	0	0	0	0
	FW	(England) ENG	Darren Beckford	47	23	43	21	2	2	2	0	0	0
	FW	(England) ENG	Nicky Cross	22	3	19	3	0	0	2	0	1	0
	FW	(Northern Ireland) NIR	Gary McKinstry	0	0	0	0	0	0	0	0	0	0
	FW	(England) ENG	Brian Mills	2	2	2	2	0	0	0	0	0	0
Players who featured but departed the club during the season:
	DF	(Nigeria) NGR	Reuben Agboola	9	0	9	0	0	0	0	0	0	0
	MF	(England) ENG	Paul Atkinson	0	0	0	0	0	0	0	0	0	0
	MF	(England) ENG	Gary Ford	35	2	30	2	2	0	2	0	1	0
	MF	(England) ENG	Colin Gibson	6	2	6	2	0	0	0	0	0	0
	MF	(England) ENG	Nick Platnauer	15	0	14	0	1	0	0	0	0	0
	FW	(England) ENG	Ronnie Jepson	19	0	15	0	2	0	2	0	0	0

=== Top scorers ===
Place	Position	Nation	Name	Second Division	FA Cup	League Cup	Full Members' Cup	Total
1	FW	England	Darren Beckford	21	2	0	0	23
2	MF	Jamaica	Robbie Earle	11	0	0	0	11
3	MF	England	Ray Walker	6	1	0	0	7
4	MF	Netherlands	Robin van der Laan	4	0	0	0	4
5	FW	England	Nicky Cross	3	0	0	0	3
6	MF	England	Colin Gibson	2	0	0	0	2
–	MF	England	Gary Ford	2	0	0	0	2
–	FW	England	Brian Mills	2	0	0	0	2
–	MF	England	John Jeffers	2	0	0	0	2
10	MF	Northern Ireland	Paul Millar	1	0	0	0	1
–	DF	England	Neil Aspin	1	0	0	0	1
–	DF	England	Dean Glover	1	0	0	0	1
			TOTALS	56	3	0	0	59

== Transfers ==
=== Transfers in ===
Date from	Position	Nationality	Name	From	Fee	Ref.
January 1991	DF	ENG	Paul West	Alcester Town	£8,000	
February 1991	MF	NED	Robin van der Laan	(Netherlands) FC Wageningen	£80,000	
March 1991	MF	ENG	Kevin Kent	Mansfield Town	£80,000	

=== Transfers out ===
Date from	Position	Nationality	Name	To	Fee	Ref.
January 1991	MF	ENG	Paul Atkinson	Gateshead	Retired	
February 1991	FW	ENG	Ronnie Jepson	Preston North End	£80,000	
March 1991	MF	ENG	Gary Ford	Mansfield Town	Exchange	
May 1991	MF	ENG	Kevin Finney	Lincoln City	Free transfer	
June 1991	FW	ENG	Darren Beckford	Norwich City	£925,000	
July 1991	MF	JAM	Robbie Earle	Wimbledon	£775,000	
August 1991	FW	NIR	Paul Millar	Cardiff City	£60,000	
August 1991	GK	ENG	Gary West	Lincoln City	£25,000	

=== Loans in ===
Date from	Position	Nationality	Name	From	Date to	Ref.
September 1990	MF	ENG	Colin Gibson	Manchester United	October 1990	
November 1990	DF	NGR	Reuben Agboola	Sunderland	December 1990	
January 1991	FW	ENG	Nick Platnauer	Notts County	April 1991	

=== Loans out ===
Date from	Position	Nationality	Name	To	Date to	Ref.
October 1990	GK	ENG	Mark Grew	Blackburn Rovers	December 1990	
October 1990	FW	NIR	Paul Millar	Hereford United	November 1990	
November 1990	GK	ENG	Gary West	Gillingham	November 1990	
January 1991	GK	ENG	Gary West	Lincoln City	January 1991	
