= Alan Webb (footballer) =

English footballer (born 1963)

Personal information
- Full name: Alan Richard Webb
- Date of birth: 1 January 1963 (age 63)
- Place of birth: Wrockwardine, England
- Height: 5 ft 10 in (1.78 m)
- Position: Right-back

Youth career
- 1978–1981: West Bromwich Albion

Senior career*
Years	Team	Apps	(Gls)
1981–1984	West Bromwich Albion	24	(0)
1983–1984	→ Lincoln City (loan)	11	(0)
1984–1992	Port Vale	190	(2)
Total		225	(2)

Managerial career
- Stourbridge (joint)
- * Club domestic league appearances and goals

Alan Richard Webb (born 1 January 1963) is an English former footballer who played as a right-back. He played 225 league games in an eleven-year career in the Football League. He spent 1981 to 1984 with West Bromwich Albion, and also played on loan at Lincoln City, but spent most of his career at Port Vale. He was voted Port Vale F.C. Player of the Year in 1984–85, helped the club to win promotion out of the Fourth Division in 1985–86, and won the Third Division play-off final with the club in 1989. He was forced into early retirement in June 1992 following a broken leg sustained in October 1989.

== Career ==
=== West Bromwich Albion ===
Webb started his career with West Bromwich Albion in the First Division in January 1981. After avoiding relegation by two points in 1981–82 under Ronnie Allen, the "Baggies" jumped to an eleventh-place finish in 1982–83 after the appointment of Ron Wylie. Webb was loaned out to Third Division club Lincoln City in 1983–84, managed by Colin Murphy. He played a total of 24 league games for West Brom and appeared eleven times in the league for Lincoln before new "Baggies" boss Johnny Giles told him he could leave the club on a free transfer.

=== Port Vale ===
Webb joined John Rudge's Fourth Division Port Vale in July 1984 and was an ever-present in 1984–85 with 56 appearances, earning himself the club's Player of the Year award. He played 48 games in 1985–86, as the "Valiants" won promotion with a fourth-place finish; he also scored his first league goal, in a 4–0 win over Southend United at Vale Park on 19 October.

Webb struggled in 1986–87 after a shin bone injury in August haltered his progress. He returned to action in time to score in a 4–1 win at York City on 14 April, his only goal in 24 appearances throughout the campaign. In 1987–88, he again struggled to stay fit in the face of numerous other injuries, including second-degree burns sustained from sliding on a plastic pitch and blood clots in his thigh. Kevin Steggles, another West Bromwich Albion player, was signed to replace him. Still, Webb recovered to post 29 appearances by the season's end.

He then played 47 games in 1988–89, scoring once in an FA Cup defeat to top-flight Norwich City. He played in the club's victory over Preston North End in the play-off semi-finals but lost his place to Gary West for the final, in which Vale beat Bristol Rovers over two legs. He made only 18 appearances in the subsequent Second Division campaign, having sustained a compound fracture in his right leg after colliding with Newcastle United's Micky Quinn on 28 October. He played six games in 1990–91 and appeared five times in 1991–92, but could not fully recover from this final injury and was forced into early retirement in June 1992. His knee never straightened following the break.

== Style of play ==
Teammate and Port Vale legend Phil Sproson named him as the club's best right-back of the 1980s. He described him as a reliable right-back and a good tackler, who lacked pace but not effort. He was versatile and consistent, able to fill in elsewhere in defence, and had a great work rate.

== Later life ==
Webb spent a few weeks with Telford United in late 1992, but his leg was not strong enough to return to football. He instead became a driver for Parcelforce. He later became joint-manager of Stourbridge.

== Career statistics ==
Appearances and goals by club, season and competition
Club	Season	League			FA Cup		Other		Total	
Club	Season	Division	Apps	Goals	Apps	Goals	Apps	Goals	Apps	Goals
West Bromwich Albion	1981–82	First Division	6	0	0	0	1	0	7	0
West Bromwich Albion	1982–83	First Division	13	0	0	0	0	0	13	0
West Bromwich Albion	1983–84	First Division	5	0	0	0	0	0	5	0
West Bromwich Albion	Total		24	0	0	0	1	0	25	0
Lincoln City (loan)	1983–84	Third Division	11	0	0	0	0	0	11	0
Port Vale	1984–85	Fourth Division	46	0	3	0	7	0	56	0
Port Vale	1985–86	Fourth Division	39	1	4	0	5	0	48	1
Port Vale	1986–87	Third Division	21	1	0	0	3	0	24	1
Port Vale	1987–88	Third Division	26	0	1	0	2	0	29	0
Port Vale	1988–89	Third Division	37	0	3	1	7	0	47	1
Port Vale	1989–90	Second Division	14	0	0	0	4	0	18	0
Port Vale	1990–91	Second Division	4	0	1	0	1	0	6	0
Port Vale	1991–92	Second Division	3	0	1	0	1	0	5	0
Port Vale	Total		190	2	13	1	30	0	233	3
Career total			225	2	13	1	31	0	269	3

== Honours ==
Port Vale

- Football League Third Division play-offs: 1989
- Football League Fourth Division fourth-place promotion: 1985–86

Individual

- Port Vale Player of the Year: 1984–85
