= 1989–90 Port Vale F.C. season =

Port Vale F.C.
1989–90 season
- Chairman: Bill Bell
- Manager: John Rudge
- Stadium: Vale Park
- Football League Second Division: 11th (61 points)
- FA Cup: Fourth Round (eliminated by Aston Villa)
- League Cup: Second Round (eliminated by Wimbledon)
- Full Members Cup: Second Round (eliminated by Middlesbrough)
- Player of the Year: Neil Aspin
- Top goalscorer: League: Darren Beckford (17); All: Darren Beckford (21)
- Highest home attendance: 22,075 vs. Stoke City, 3 February 1990
- Lowest home attendance: 4,441 vs. Walsall, 28 August 1989
- Average home league attendance: 8,978
- Biggest win: 5–0 vs. Ipswich Town, 1 January 1990
- Biggest defeat: 0–6 vs. Aston Villa, 27 January 1990
Home colours	Away colours

The 1989–90 season was Port Vale's 78th season of football in the English Football League and first (33rd overall) season back in the Second Division following their promotion from the Third Division. Under enduring manager John Rudge and chairman Bill Bell, the club achieved a respectable 11th‑place finish in their maiden second‑tier campaign — an impressive debut under the circumstances.

Darren Beckford spearheaded the attack and finished as top scorer, scoring 17 goals in the league and 21 across all competitions. He received strong support from Nicky Cross, who added 13 league goals (15 in all competitions), and Robbie Earle, who contributed 12 goals overall. Vale eliminated First Division club Derby County from the Third Round FA Cup, before exiting the competition at the next round with a heavy defeat to Aston Villa. They were knocked out of the League Cup and Full Members' Cup at the Second Round. The campaign also saw Neil Aspin emerge as a fan favourite: he was appointed club captain, featured in 51 matches, and earned the Player of the Year award for his consistency and leadership.

A solid first season in the second tier under Rudge saw Vale establish themselves mid-table, powered by Beckford's goals and Aspin's leadership.

== Overview ==
=== Second Division ===
The pre-season saw John Rudge sign solid 24-year-old defender Neil Aspin from Leeds United for £150,000; 28-year-old forward Nicky Cross from Leicester City for £125,000; and 34-year-old winger Ian Miller on a free transfer from Blackburn Rovers (as cover for an injured Gary Ford). The Burslem club had never previously spent anything close to the £275,000 spent in summer 1989. Yet, other clubs in the division far outspent the Vale. Vale Park was also upgraded at £250,000, though grants helped to halve the cost for the club itself. Inspectors closed the Bycars End down despite this effort due to safety issues. They reduced the stadium's capacity to 12,000 after cutting the capacity of the Railway Paddock by two-thirds. Season ticket sales more than doubled to 2,231. Phil Sproson attempted to return to the game, and so the club accepted a £50,000 transfer payment from Birmingham City to compensate for their insurance payout. Meanwhile, the Vale were the bookmakers' favourites for relegation, having started the season with six players out injured, including Ray Walker.

The season opened with a 2–2 draw with Bradford City at Valley Parade, Vale missing out on all three points due to a late equaliser from Brian Tinnion. This was followed by a 2–1 home win over West Bromwich Albion the following week. The club soon scrapped their all-ticket rule after poor attendances in the first games. Vale went seven games without a win in the league, though on 23 September managed a 1–1 draw with Stoke at the Victoria Ground, some 27,004 fans in attendance. Rudge commented after the match that "[the result] proves that we have closed the gap on Stoke and are now competing on equal terms"

On 7 October, Vale came from behind to beat Leicester City by two goals to one. The police bills for Vale games reached as much as £1.50 a head for some games, though the police went some way to justify this cost by arresting 85 people on the day of the Potteries derby. Rudge switched from a 4–4–2 formation to 4–3–3 so as to include Miller, and a mini-revival followed, ending with a 3–0 win over Barnsley at Oakwell. Six games without a win followed, and Alan Webb broke his leg during a 2–2 draw with Newcastle United at St James' Park. In November, Vale Park opened a new 48 seat disabled stand at a cost of £100,000. Ron Futcher was then sold to Fourth Division Burnley for £60,000, though an injury crisis in defence exposed the club's lack of squad depth. With Gary West out with damaged ligaments, big defender Tim Parkin was bought from Swindon Town for £60,000. The next month the Hamil End was reopened after £175,000 worth of renewal work. On 9 December, Vale fell to a 2–1 defeat away at Hull City. Rudge switched back to 4–4–2, utilising Andy Porter in midfield.

Vale went six games unbeaten over the new year, beating fifth-placed Ipswich Town 5–0 (their biggest win in the division since 1932) and fighting to a goalless home draw with Stoke in the process. Ipswich had been unbeaten in 13 games. The Stoke game was a disappointment as City were adrift at the foot of the table, and the pitch was 'as lumpy as porridge' for what finished as a goalless draw. The Bycars End reopened after a £90,000 investment, 22,075 fans turned up for the game – the biggest gate for a league game since the visit of Grimsby Town in 1960. On 10 February, Vale recorded a 1–0 home win over Watford as Paul Millar put in an excellent performance after having to replace Darren Beckford, who had been taken ill overnight. This moved Vale to within three points of the play-offs. They went on to win 3–0 against Plymouth Argyle during a hailstorm at Vale Park on 24 February. The team went on to beat sixth-placed Wolverhampton Wanderers by three goals to one on 24 March. Seven days later, Vale came away from the Boleyn Ground with a 2–2 draw, thanks to Mark Grew, who saved penalties from both Julian Dicks and Jimmy Quinn; West Ham United manager Billy Bonds stated that Vale were "a fair side who play some good, neat football". A poor March dragged them down the table, though, as the stadium's capacity was again reduced and the police bill spiralled.

In April, Rudge sold David Riley to Peterborough United for £40,000, whilst £20,000 was spent bringing in left-sided forward Gary McKinstrey from Portadown. On 11 April, Vale came from two goals down to win 3–2 at Middlesbrough with Beckford scoring a brace. The club's play-off dreams were killed off by a 2–1 defeat from fourth-placed Newcastle United, after which only two points were won from the final four games. Despite this the supporters held popular player Neil Aspin aloft following the team's final home game (a 2–1 defeat to Sunderland). The final game was a goalless draw with Oxford United at the Manor Ground, which was enough to ensure a top-half finish. The team were taken on a trip to Spain for their efforts, whilst rivals Stoke were relegated.

They finished in eleventh place with 61 points, their highest finish since 1933–34. Darren Beckford was top-scorer with 21 goals in all competitions, with Nicky Cross and Robbie Earle bagged 15 and 12 goals respectively. The average home attendance of 8,978 was the highest since 1963–64. The players were taken on a holiday to Spain as a reward for their efforts. Rudge retained the entire playing staff at the end of the season.

=== Finances ===
The club's shirt sponsors were ABC Minolta Copiers. The club made over £200,000 from the FA Cup matches with Derby County.

=== Cup competitions ===
In the FA Cup, Vale were drawn against top-flight Derby County in the third round and progressed 3–2 in the replay at The Baseball Ground having 'gave as good as they received' as they drew the original tie 1–1. The win was 'another famous cup victory' for the club, as three goals were put past Peter Shilton. Another difficult fixture awaited in the fourth round. On 27 January, Aston Villa inflicted Vale's biggest ever cup defeat with a 6–0 win in front of 36,532 fans at Villa Park. Nevertheless, the cup run raised £150,000.

In the League Cup, Vale overcame Third Division Walsall 3–1 on aggregate, having won 1–0 at home and 2–1 at Fellows Park. They then came unstuck against First Division Wimbledon, losing 2–1 at home before getting beaten 3–0 at Plough Lane.

In the short-lived Full Members Cup, Vale made it past the first round with a 2–1 win over Sunderland at Roker Park, with Walker and Cross getting the goals. They were then eliminated by Middlesbrough at the next stage, after losing 3–1 at Ayresome Park despite Rudge playing a strong side and the Vale holding a one-goal lead at half-time.

== Results ==
=== Football League Second Division ===
==== League table ====
Pos	Team	Pld	W	D	L	GF	GA	GD	Pts
9	Ipswich Town	46	19	12	15	67	66	+1	69
10	Wolverhampton Wanderers	46	18	13	15	67	60	+7	67
11	Port Vale	46	15	16	15	62	57	+5	61
12	Portsmouth	46	15	16	15	62	65	−3	61
13	Leicester City	46	15	14	17	67	79	−12	59

Source: Statto
Rules for classification: 1) Points; 2) Goal difference; 3) Goals scored

==== Results by matchday ====
Round	1	2	3	4	5	6	7	8	9	10	11	12	13	14	15	16	17	18	19	20	21	22	23	24	25	26	27	28	29	30	31	32	33	34	35	36	37	38	39	40	41	42	43	44	45	46
Ground	A	H	A	H	H	A	A	A	H	H	A	A	H	A	H	H	A	H	A	H	A	H	A	A	H	A	H	H	H	A	H	A	A	H	A	H	H	A	H	A	A	H	A	H	H	A
Result	D	W	L	D	D	L	D	L	D	W	W	L	D	D	D	L	L	W	W	W	L	D	L	D	W	W	W	D	W	L	W	L	D	D	L	W	W	D	L	W	L	W	L	D	L	D
Position	10	7	13	17	12	19	18	20	20	20	13	15	16	15	15	15	16	15	14	13	13	14	15	16	14	12	9	10	9	10	9	9	10	11	11	11	11	11	11	11	11	11	11	11	11	11
Points	1	4	4	5	6	6	7	7	8	11	14	14	15	16	17	17	17	20	23	26	26	27	27	28	31	34	37	38	41	41	44	44	45	46	46	49	52	53	53	56	56	59	59	60	60	61

Source: Statto
A = Away; H = Home; W = Win; D = Draw; L = Loss

==== Matches ====
19 August 1989 1	Bradford City	2–2	Port Vale	Bradford
		Report	Glover (pen.); Beckford	Stadium: Valley Parade; Attendance: 10,242

26 August 1989 2	Port Vale	2–1	West Bromwich Albion	Burslem
	Glover (pen.); Futcher	Report		Stadium: Vale Park; Attendance: 7,695

2 September 1989 3	Brighton & Hove Albion	2–0	Port Vale	Hove
		Report		Stadium: Goldstone Ground; Attendance: 7,218

9 September 1989 4	Port Vale	0–0	Blackburn Rovers	Burslem
		Report		Stadium: Vale Park; Attendance: 7,601

12 September 1989 5	Port Vale	1–1	Hull City	Burslem
19:30 BST	Earle	Report	McParland 66'	Stadium: Vale Park; Attendance: 6,168

16 September 1989 6	Watford	1–0	Port Vale	Watford
	Wilkinson	Report		Stadium: Vicarage Road; Attendance: 8,445

23 September 1989 7	Stoke City	1–1	Port Vale	Stoke-upon-Trent
	Palin 66'	Report	Earle	Stadium: Victoria Ground; Attendance: 27,004

26 September 1989 8	AFC Bournemouth	1–0	Port Vale	Bournemouth
		Report		Stadium: Dean Court; Attendance: 6,511

30 September 1989 9	Port Vale	0–0	Leeds United	Burslem
		Report		Stadium: Vale Park; Attendance: 11,156

7 October 1989 10	Port Vale	2–1	Leicester City	Burslem
	Beckford; Cross	Report	Reid	Stadium: Vale Park; Attendance: 7,268

14 October 1989 11	Barnsley	0–3	Port Vale	Barnsley
		Report	Cross; Earle	Stadium: Oakwell; Attendance: 6,475

17 October 1989 12	Wolverhampton Wanderers	2–0	Port Vale	Wolverhampton
		Report		Stadium: Molineux Stadium; Attendance: 18,123

21 October 1989 13	Port Vale	2–2	West Ham United	Burslem
	(og.); Futcher	Report	Slater; Keen	Stadium: Vale Park; Attendance: 8,899

28 October 1989 14	Newcastle United	2–2	Port Vale	Newcastle upon Tyne
	McGhee 10'; Quinn 55'	Report	Earle 83'; Futcher 90'	Stadium: St James' Park; Attendance: 17,824

30 October 1989 15	Port Vale	1–1	Middlesbrough	Burslem
	Glover (pen.)	Report	Kernaghan	Stadium: Vale Park; Attendance: 7,708

4 November 1989 16	Port Vale	1–2	Oxford United	Burslem
	Jeffers	Report	Ford; Durnin	Stadium: Vale Park; Attendance: 6,994

11 November 1989 17	Portsmouth	2–0	Port Vale	Portsmouth
	Whittingham; Black	Report		Stadium: Fratton Park; Attendance: 7,708

18 November 1989 18	Port Vale	2–0	Swindon Town	Burslem
	Beckford 21'; Cross 41'	Report		Stadium: Vale Park; Attendance: 7,393; Referee: A. Buksh

25 November 1989 19	Plymouth Argyle	1–2	Port Vale	Plymouth
	Tynan	Report	Cross	Stadium: Home Park; Attendance: 7,034

2 December 1989 20	Port Vale	3–2	Bradford City	Burslem
	Earle; Beckford	Report		Stadium: Vale Park; Attendance: 6,762

9 December 1989 21	Hull City	2–1	Port Vale	Kingston upon Hull
15:00 GMT	Payton 15'; Doyle 25'	Report	Earle	Stadium: Boothferry Park; Attendance: 4,207

16 December 1989 22	Port Vale	1–1	Sheffield United	Burslem
	Cross	Report		Stadium: Vale Park; Attendance: 9,813

26 December 1989 23	Oldham Athletic	2–1	Port Vale	Oldham
	Adams 29'; Barrett 59'	Report	Parkin 61'	Stadium: Boundary Park; Attendance: 11,274; Referee: T Mills

30 December 1989 24	Sunderland	2–2	Port Vale	Sunderland
	Gabbiadini 82'; Hauser 89'	Report	Kay 34' (og.); Millar 63'	Stadium: Roker Park; Attendance: 21,377; Referee: David Phillips

1 January 1990 25	Port Vale	5–0	Ipswich Town	Burslem
	Beckford; Earle; Cross; Miller	Report		Stadium: Vale Park; Attendance: 8,617

13 January 1990 26	West Bromwich Albion	2–3	Port Vale	West Bromwich
		Report	Cross; Beckford; Porter	Stadium: The Hawthorns; Attendance: 13,575

20 January 1990 27	Port Vale	2–1	Brighton & Hove Albion	Burslem
	Cross	Report		Stadium: Vale Park; Attendance: 8,666

3 February 1990 28	Port Vale	0–0	Stoke City	Burslem
		Report		Stadium: Vale Park; Attendance: 22,075

10 February 1990 29	Port Vale	1–0	Watford	Burslem
	Earle	Report		Stadium: Vale Park; Attendance: 7,064

17 February 1990 30	Blackburn Rovers	1–0	Port Vale	Blackburn
		Report		Stadium: Ewood Park; Attendance: 9,257

24 February 1990 31	Port Vale	3–0	Plymouth Argyle	Burslem
	Hughes; Beckford; Mills	Report		Stadium: Vale Park; Attendance: 7,254

3 March 1990 32	Swindon Town	3–0	Port Vale	Swindon
	Calderwood 11'; White 26'; Shearer 41'	Report		Stadium: County Ground; Attendance: 8,314; Referee: M.E. Pierce

7 March 1990 33	Leeds United	0–0	Port Vale	Beeston, Leeds
		Report		Stadium: Elland Road; Attendance: 29,550

10 March 1990 34	Port Vale	1–1	AFC Bournemouth	Burslem
	Millar	Report		Stadium: Vale Park; Attendance: 7,131

17 March 1990 35	Leicester City	2–0	Port Vale	Leicester
	North; Walsh	Report		Stadium: Filbert Street; Attendance: 10,076

19 March 1990 36	Port Vale	2–1	Barnsley	Burslem
	(og.); Beckford	Report		Stadium: Vale Park; Attendance: 7,036

24 March 1990 37	Port Vale	3–1	Wolverhampton Wanderers	Burslem
	Millar; Beckford; Earle	Report		Stadium: Vale Park; Attendance: 12,506

31 March 1990 38	West Ham United	2–2	Port Vale	Upton Park, London
	Gale; Morley	Report	Beckford; Cross	Stadium: Boleyn Ground; Attendance: 20,507

7 April 1990 39	Port Vale	1–2	Newcastle United	Burslem
15:00 BST	Earle 82'	Report	McGhee 20'; Quinn 28'	Stadium: Vale Park; Attendance: 10,290; Referee: Rodger Gifford

11 April 1990 40	Middlesbrough	2–3	Port Vale	Middlesbrough
	Davenport; Slaven	Report	Beckford; Glover (pen.)	Stadium: Ayresome Park; Attendance: 14,973

14 April 1990 41	Ipswich Town	3–2	Port Vale	Ipswich
		Report	Earle; Cross (pen.)	Stadium: Portman Road; Attendance: 10,652

16 April 1990 42	Port Vale	2–0	Oldham Athletic	Burslem
	Beckford 40', 49'	Report		Stadium: Vale Park; Attendance: 11,451; Referee: RG Milford

21 April 1990 43	Sheffield United	2–1	Port Vale	Sheffield
		Report	Beckford	Stadium: Bramall Lane; Attendance: 16,809

28 April 1990 44	Port Vale	1–1	Portsmouth	Burslem
	Beckford	Report	Kuhl	Stadium: Vale Park; Attendance: 7,492

1 May 1990 45	Port Vale	1–2	Sunderland	Burslem
	Millar 18'	Report	Hardyman 12'; Owers 19'	Stadium: Vale Park; Attendance: 9,447; Referee: Paul Danson

5 May 1990 46	Oxford United	0–0	Port Vale	Oxford
		Report		Stadium: Manor Ground; Attendance: 4,708

=== FA Cup ===
7 January 1990 R3	Port Vale	1–1	Derby County	Burslem
	Beckford	Report	Hebberd	Stadium: Vale Park; Attendance: 17,478

10 January 1990 Replay	Derby County	2–3	Port Vale	Derby
	Ramage; Francis	Report	(og.); Walker; Cross	Stadium: Baseball Ground; Attendance: 21,389

27 January 1990 R4	Aston Villa	6–0	Port Vale	Birmingham
	Platt 8'; Birch 25', 79'; Olney 52'; Gray 65', 84'	Report		Stadium: Villa Park; Attendance: 36,532; Referee: George Courtney

=== League Cup ===
22 August 1989 R1 1st Leg	Walsall	1–2	Port Vale	Walsall
		Report	Beckford	Stadium: Fellows Park; Attendance: 4,774

28 August 1989 R1 2nd Leg	Port Vale	1–0 (3–1 agg.)	Walsall	Burslem
	Beckford	Report		Stadium: Vale Park; Attendance: 4,441

18 September 1989 R2 1st Leg	Port Vale	1–2	Wimbledon	Burslem
	Futcher	Report		Stadium: Vale Park; Attendance: 5,827

4 October 1989 R2 2nd Leg	Wimbledon	3–0 (5–1 agg.)	Port Vale	Wimbledon, London
		Report		Stadium: Plough Lane; Attendance: 2,851

=== Full Members Cup ===
14 November 1989 R1	Sunderland	1–2	Port Vale	Sunderland
	Armstrong 35' (pen.)	Report	Walker 27'; Cross 50'	Stadium: Roker Park; Attendance: 7,031; Referee: Neil Midgley

29 November 1989 R2	Middlesbrough	3–1	Port Vale	Middlesbrough
		Report	Jeffers	Stadium: Ayresome Park; Attendance: 6,691

== Squad statistics ==
=== Appearances and goals ===
Key to positions: GK – Goalkeeper; DF – Defender; MF – Midfielder; FW – Forward

No.	Pos	Nat	Player	Total		Second Division		FA Cup		League Cup		Full Members' Cup	
No.	Pos	Nat	Player	Apps	Goals	Apps	Goals	Apps	Goals	Apps	Goals	Apps	Goals
	GK	(England) ENG	Mark Grew	51	0	43	0	3	0	4	0	1	0
	GK	(Northern Ireland) NIR	Trevor Wood	4	0	3	0	0	0	0	0	1	0
	DF	(England) ENG	Neil Aspin	51	0	42	0	3	0	4	0	2	0
	DF	(England) ENG	Dean Glover	52	4	44	4	3	0	4	0	1	0
	DF	(England) ENG	Darren Hughes	46	1	38	1	3	0	4	0	1	0
	DF	(England) ENG	Simon Mills	54	1	45	1	3	0	4	0	2	0
	DF	(England) ENG	Tim Parkin	12	1	12	1	0	0	0	0	0	0
	DF	(England) ENG	Alan Webb	18	0	14	0	0	0	4	0	0	0
	DF	(England) ENG	Gary West	3	0	3	0	0	0	0	0	0	0
	MF	(Jamaica) JAM	Robbie Earle	52	12	43	12	3	0	4	0	2	0
	MF	(England) ENG	Kevin Finney	9	0	8	0	0	0	1	0	0	0
	MF	(England) ENG	John Jeffers	46	2	40	1	2	0	2	0	2	1
	MF	(Northern Ireland) NIR	Paul Millar	26	4	23	4	2	0	0	0	1	0
	MF	(Scotland) SCO	Ian Miller	24	1	21	1	0	0	2	0	1	0
	MF	(England) ENG	Andy Porter	44	1	36	1	3	0	3	0	2	0
	MF	(England) ENG	Ray Walker	47	2	40	0	3	1	2	0	2	1
	FW	(England) ENG	Darren Beckford	51	21	42	17	3	1	4	3	2	0
	FW	(England) ENG	Nicky Cross	50	15	42	13	3	1	3	0	2	1
	FW	(England) ENG	Ronnie Jepson	8	0	8	0	0	0	0	0	0	0
Players who featured but departed the club during the season:
	FW	(England) ENG	Ron Futcher	15	4	11	3	0	0	4	1	0	0
	FW	(England) ENG	David Riley	5	0	2	0	1	0	0	0	2	0

=== Top scorers ===
Place	Position	Nation	Name	Second Division	FA Cup	League Cup	Full Members Cup	Total
1	FW	England	Darren Beckford	17	1	3	0	21
2	FW	England	Nicky Cross	13	1	0	1	15
3	MF	Jamaica	Robbie Earle	12	0	0	0	12
4	MF	Northern Ireland	Paul Millar	4	0	0	0	4
–	DF	England	Dean Glover	4	0	0	0	4
–	FW	England	Ron Futcher	3	0	1	0	4
7	MF	England	John Jeffers	1	0	0	1	2
–	MF	England	Ray Walker	0	1	0	1	2
9	MF	England	Ian Miller	1	0	0	0	1
–	MF	England	Andy Porter	1	0	0	0	1
–	DF	England	Simon Mills	1	0	0	0	1
–	DF	England	Tim Parkin	1	0	0	0	1
–	FW	England	Darren Hughes	1	0	0	0	1
–		–	Own goals	3	1	0	0	4
			TOTALS	62	4	4	3	73

== Transfers ==
=== Transfers in ===
Date from	Position	Nationality	Name	From	Fee	Ref.
June 1989	FW	ENG	Nicky Cross	Leicester City	£125,000	
June 1989	MF	SCO	Ian Miller	Blackburn Rovers	Free transfer	
28 July 1989	DF	ENG	Neil Aspin	Leeds United	£150,000	
8 December 1989	DF	ENG	Tim Parkin	Swindon Town	£60,000	
3 April 1990	FW	NIR	Gary McKinstrey	(Northern Ireland) Portadown		

=== Transfers out ===
Date from	Position	Nationality	Name	To	Fee	Ref.
13 November 1989	FW	ENG	Ron Futcher	Burnley	£60,000	
3 April 1990	FW	ENG	David Riley	Peterborough United	£40,000	
August 1990	MF	SCO	Ian Miller	Scunthorpe United	Free transfer	

=== Loans out ===
Date from	Position	Nationality	Name	To	Date to	Ref.
25 January 1990	FW	ENG	Ronnie Jepson	Peterborough United	March 1990	
1 March 1990	FW	ENG	David Riley	Peterborough United	April 1990	
16 March 1990	MF	ENG	Paul Atkinson	Hartlepool United	End of season	
22 March 1990	MF	ENG	Gary Ford	Walsall	End of season	
