= Brian Palgrave =

English footballer (born 1966)

Personal information
- Full name: Brian Uriel Palgrave
- Date of birth: 12 July 1966 (age 60)
- Place of birth: Birmingham, England
- Height: 5 ft 8 in (1.73 m)
- Position: Forward

Youth career
- Alvechurch

Senior career*
| Years | Team | Apps | (Gls) |
| 1984–1987 | Walsall | 8 | (1) |
| 1987–1988 | Port Vale (trial) | 0 | (0) |
| 1988–1989 | Nuneaton Borough | 63 | (15) |
| 1989–19?? | Bromsgrove Rovers | | |
| 19??–19?? | Stafford Rangers | | |
- * Club domestic league appearances and goals

Brian Uriel Palgrave (born 12 July 1966) is an English former footballer who played as a forward for Alvechurch, Walsall, Port Vale, Nuneaton Borough, Bromsgrove Rovers, and Stafford Rangers.

== Career ==
Palgrave played for Alvechurch (Southern League), before joining Walsall. Alan Buckley's "Saddlers" finished 11th in the Third Division in 1984–85, and then sixth in 1985–86. New boss Tommy Coakley took the club to eighth spot in 1986–87. He scored one goal in eight league games at Fellows Park. He joined John Rudge's Third Division Port Vale on trial in October 1987. His only appearance at Vale Park was as a substitute in a 2–1 win over Exeter City in a preliminary round Football League Trophy match on 26 October. He was released in January 1988 and moved on to Nuneaton Borough, who were struggling near the foot of the Southern League Premier Division; manager Chris Wright signed Bedworth United defender Floyd Peltier on the same day. He made his debut at Manor Park on 16 January, in a 2–1 win over former club Alvechurch. He scored his first goal for "Boro" on 6 February, in a 4–1 home win over Chelmsford City. He scored nine goals from 23 appearances in the second half of the 1987–88 season, but was unable to help the club to keep out of the relegation zone. He scored eight goals from 47 matches in the 1988–89 season, which saw Nuneaton post a fifth-place finish in the Midland Division. He then went the first seven games of the 1989–90 season without scoring and was moved on to Premier Division club Bromsgrove Rovers for a "small fee" after new manager Les Green instigated a clear out of the playing staff. He later played for Stafford Rangers (Conference).

== Career statistics ==
Appearances and goals by club, season and competition
| Club | Season | League | | | FA Cup | | Other | | Total | |
| Club | Season | Division | Apps | Goals | Apps | Goals | Apps | Goals | Apps | Goals |
|---|---|---|---|---|---|---|---|---|---|---|
| Walsall | 1984–85 | Third Division | 4 | 0 | 0 | 0 | 0 | 0 | 4 | 0 |
| Walsall | 1985–86 | Third Division | 2 | 1 | 0 | 0 | 0 | 0 | 2 | 1 |
| Walsall | 1986–87 | Third Division | 1 | 0 | 0 | 0 | 0 | 0 | 1 | 0 |
| Walsall | 1987–88 | Third Division | 1 | 0 | 0 | 0 | 0 | 0 | 1 | 0 |
| Walsall | Total | | 8 | 1 | 0 | 0 | 0 | 0 | 8 | 1 |
| Port Vale (trial) | 1987–88 | Third Division | 0 | 0 | 0 | 0 | 1 | 0 | 1 | 0 |
| Nuneaton Borough | 1987–88 | Southern League Premier Division | 21 | 9 | 0 | 0 | 2 (Note: Appearance(s) in the M&B Cup) | 0 | 23 | 9 |
| Nuneaton Borough | 1988–89 | Southern League Midland Division | 37 | 6 | 3 | 0 | 7 (Note: 2 appearances and 2 goals in the Southern League Cup, 2 appearances in the M&B Cup, 2 appearances in the Birmingham Senior Cup and 1 appearance in the FA Trophy) | 2 | 47 | 8 |
| Nuneaton Borough | 1989–90 | Southern League Midland Division | 5 | 0 | 2 | 0 | 0 | 0 | 7 | 0 |
| Nuneaton Borough | Total | | 63 | 15 | 5 | 0 | 9 | 2 | 77 | 17 |
