= Darren Beckford =

English footballer (1967–2026)

Personal information
- Full name: Darren Richard Lorenzo Beckford
- Date of birth: 12 May 1967
- Place of birth: Moss Side, Manchester, England
- Date of death: 8 November 2026 (aged 59)
- Height: 6 ft 1 in (1.85 m)
- Position: Forward

Youth career
- 1980–1984: Manchester City

Senior career*
Years	Team	Apps	(Gls)
1984–1987	Manchester City	11	(0)
1985	→ Bury (loan)	12	(5)
1987	→ Port Vale (loan)	11	(4)
1987–1991	Port Vale	167	(67)
1991–1993	Norwich City	38	(8)
1993–1996	Oldham Athletic	52	(11)
1996–1997	Heart of Midlothian	8	(0)
1997	Preston North End	2	(0)
1997	Fulham	0	(0)
1997	Walsall	8	(0)
1997	Rushden & Diamonds		
1997	Southport	0	(0)
1997	Total Network Solutions	4	(1)
1997–1998	Bury	0	(0)
1998	Bacup Borough		
Total		324	(100)

International career
1982	England Schoolboys		
1983–1984	England U17	15	(6)
- * Club domestic league appearances and goals

Darren Richard Lorenzo Beckford (12 May 1967 – 8 November 2026) was an English professional footballer who played as a forward. He began his career with Manchester City before joining Port Vale in 1987, where he established himself as one of the club's most prolific goalscorers.

Beckford helped Port Vale win promotion to the Second Division through the play-offs in 1989 and finished as the club's leading scorer for four consecutive seasons. His performances earned him a £925,000 transfer to Norwich City in 1991, at the time a record sale for Port Vale. He subsequently played for Oldham Athletic, Heart of Midlothian and several other clubs in England, Scotland and Wales. His younger brother Jason Beckford also played professional football.

== Career ==
=== Manchester City ===
Beckford was a product of the Manchester City youth team and made his first-team debut at the age of 16. As a member of Jehovah's Witnesses, he rejected an opportunity to represent England at youth team level as he refused to stand for the national anthem, seeing it as saluting the flag and therefore unchristian behaviour. The management at Maine Road took a dim view at this stance and did not play him in the first-team for another 12 months. Prior to this, he had scored six goals in 15 games for England U17. He went out on loan at Third Division club Bury, scoring five goals in twelve games at Gigg Lane.

=== Port Vale ===
Beckford joined Port Vale on an initial loan basis, with Manchester City manager Jimmy Frizzell believing that a striking partnership with another youngster in Andy Jones would aid his development. He stayed for three months at the end of the 1986–87 season and then joined the club permanently for a fee of £15,000 (plus 50% of any future transfer fee – a clause that Vale later bought out for an undisclosed sum). This was settled by a Football League tribunal as a compromise between Vale's offer of £5,000 and City's demand of £60,000. Vale fans raised £7,500 of the fee with a 'buy a player' fund. He later admitted that throughout his early career his nerves caused him to vomit before games. Andy Jones was sold to Charlton Athletic and Beckford instead formed a strike partnership with Ron Futcher.

"A terrific goal-scorer. Darren was very athletic, had unbelievable spring in his legs and could finish. As a striker, he ticked all the boxes. If we came up against a top team, we knew he was easily good enough to hold his own. Darren had a unique personality. If someone upset him off the pitch then you knew it could affect his performance. Then again, management would be easy if every player was like Andy Porter. In his case, you just gave him the shirt, told him what to do and then let him get on with it. In Becky's case, he was more likely to stop the training session halfway through to ask why we were doing such-and-such drills. The rest of us would be urging him to just get on with it, or we'd never get finished."

— Robbie Earle in 2012.

He scored his first hat-trick for the club on 2 April 1988, during a 5–0 demolition of Doncaster Rovers. Throughout 1987–88 he was the club's top scorer with ten goals, along with David Riley. That season Vale won every game in which Beckford made it onto the score sheet. He was once again top scorer in 1988–89, this time bagging 23 goals as the club won promotion to the Second Division via the play-offs. On 19 September, he scored a hat-trick in a 5–0 home win over Chesterfield. On 25 March, he scored a hat-trick in a 4–1 victory over Notts County. On 25 May, he scored a hat-trick as Vale beat Preston North End 3–1 in the play-off semi-final second leg, giving them a 4–2 aggregate victory. He also provided the crucial second goal of the 1989 final, flicking on a corner for Robbie Earle to knock into the net. He adapted well to tougher opposition in the 1989–90 season. He managed 21 goals to become the club's top scorer yet again. He became the club's top scorer for the fourth consecutive season with 23 goals in 1990–91. He managed to bag a hat-trick against Blackburn Rovers and also found the net against former club Manchester City in the FA Cup. After the hat-trick against Blackburn, Beckford told the press he was happy at the club and dismissed numerous transfer rumours linking him with moves to other clubs.

"Darren Beckford was a brilliant striker for the Vale, but a nightmare to manage. It was like throwing a blancmange at the wall, you just hope that a bit of it sticks!"

— Manager John Rudge.

Beckford played 214 games and scored 81 times for John Rudge's side. He was sold to Norwich City of the First Division (soon to be rebranded as the Premier League) in June 1991. The fee that Norwich paid for him – £925,000 – was set by a Football League tribunal (Vale had wanted £1.5 million) and was a club record that stood until 1994. £200,000 of the sum went to Manchester City. Vale signed his brother Jason to replace him, though he could not replicate his elder sibling's success.

=== Norwich City ===
Norwich manager Dave Stringer had been looking to sign a regular goalscorer for some time, and when Beckford signed, he described Beckford as "the answer to the Norwich supporter's prayers". However, he injured his thigh in pre-season training in Russia and, by Christmas, underwent a double hernia operation. His spell at Carrow Road was inconsistent and he only scored 13 times in 49 appearances. Supporters, in particular, criticised that many of these goals were scored against weaker opposition in the League Cup. The highlight of his time at Norwich was his hat-trick in a 4–3 win against Everton – a victory which would prove key to the Canaries avoiding the drop in 1991–92. That season, he also proved to be a versatile player, taking over in goal when Bryan Gunn sustained a back injury during a game against Sheffield United at Bramall Lane. He made several fine saves but was finally beaten Ian Bryson in a 1–0 defeat. He did, though, end the season with a ruptured ankle ligament sustained in the penultimate match of the campaign.

The 1992–93 season signalled the beginning of the end for Beckford as a Norwich City player. In the close season, Mike Walker signed Mark Robins for £800,000 from Manchester United and started to push Chris Sutton up from central defence to lead the Norwich attack. A lack of form also meant that he had now fallen behind Lee Power and Rob Newman in the pecking order. However, Beckford was still able to make some crucial contributions, including scoring a vital goal in a 3–2 victory against fellow title chasers Aston Villa at Villa Park.

=== Oldham and final years ===
After less than two seasons with Norwich, Beckford was sold to Oldham Athletic in March 1993 for £300,000. Manager Joe Royle had been a long-term admirer of Beckford. He played 52 times and scored 17 goals before being released in the summer of 1996 after sustaining a hamstring injury. He then unsuccessfully searched for a club to give him first-team football for the next two years. Initially, after leaving Oldham, he joined Heart of Midlothian, where he contributed to their run to the 1996 Scottish League Cup final. After goals against St Johnstone and Dundee, he played as a substitute in the final itself. These were, however, the only two goals he scored for Hearts. He then signed short-term deals with Fulham, Walsall, Rushden & Diamonds, Southport, Total Network Solutions, Bury, and Bacup Borough before retiring.

== Personal and later life ==
His parents, Dudley and Valdene, were from Jamaica. His brother Jason Beckford is a former professional footballer. His nephew Ethan Beckford has also played professional football. Lauren, his daughter from his first marriage, played for Manchester United Women and Everton. His stepson, Danny Webber, also played professional football.

After retiring as a footballer, Beckford began working for The Prince's Trust working with youngsters in Manchester. In September 1998 he won a successful tribunal case against the trust for being racially victimised. He later worked as an attendance officer at Claremont Primary School in Moss Side, Manchester. He received a two-year community rehabilitation order for domestic violence in November 2005.

Beckford died on 8 November 2026, aged 59.

== Career statistics ==
Appearances and goals by club, season and competition
Club	Season	League			National cup (Note: Includes FA Cup, Scottish Cup, Welsh Cup)		Other		Total	
Club	Season	Division	Apps	Goals	Apps	Goals	Apps	Goals	Apps	Goals
Manchester City	1984–85	Second Division	4	0	0	0	1	0	5	0
Manchester City	1985–86	First Division	3	0	0	0	0	0	3	0
Manchester City	1986–87	First Division	4	0	0	0	0	0	4	0
Manchester City	Total		11	0	0	0	1	0	12	0
Bury (loan)	1985–86	Third Division	12	5	0	0	0	0	12	5
Port Vale (loan)	1986–87	Third Division	11	4	0	0	0	0	11	4
Port Vale	1987–88	Third Division	40	9	6	1	4	0	50	10
Port Vale	1988–89	Third Division	42	20	3	0	10	3	55	23
Port Vale	1989–90	Second Division	42	17	3	1	6	3	51	21
Port Vale	1990–91	Second Division	43	21	2	2	2	0	47	23
Port Vale	Total		178	71	14	4	22	6	214	81
Norwich City	1991–92	First Division	30	7	3	0	6	4	39	11
Norwich City	1992–93	Premier League	8	1	2	1	0	0	10	2
Norwich City	Total		38	8	5	1	6	4	49	13
Oldham Athletic	1992–93	Premier League	7	3	0	0	0	0	7	3
Oldham Athletic	1993–94	Premier League	22	6	6	3	2	1	30	10
Oldham Athletic	1994–95	First Division	3	0	2	0	0	0	5	0
Oldham Athletic	1995–96	First Division	20	2	1	2	2	0	23	4
Oldham Athletic	Total		52	11	9	5	4	1	65	17
Heart of Midlothian	1996–97	Scottish Premier Division	8	0	0	0	4	2	12	2
Preston North End	1996–97	Second Division	2	0	0	0	1	0	3	0
Fulham	1996–97	Third Division	0	0	0	0	0	0	0	0
Walsall	1996–97	Second Division	8	0	0	0	0	0	8	0
Southport	1997–98	Conference	0	0	0	0	1	1	1	1
Total Network Solutions	1997–98	League of Wales	4	1	0	0	0	0	4	1
Bury	1997–98	First Division	0	0	0	0	0	0	0	0
Career total			324	100	28	10	39	14	391	124

== Honours ==
Port Vale

- Football League Third Division play-offs: 1989

Heart of Midlothian

- Scottish League Cup runner-up: 1995–96
