= Ray Walker (footballer, born 1963) =

English footballer (born 1963)

Personal information
- Full name: Raymond Walker
- Date of birth: 28 September 1963 (age 63)
- Place of birth: North Shields, England
- Height: 5 ft 10 in (1.78 m)
- Position: Midfielder

Youth career
- 1979–1981: Aston Villa

Senior career*
Years	Team	Apps	(Gls)
1981–1986	Aston Villa	23	(0)
1984	→ Port Vale (loan)	15	(1)
1986–1997	Port Vale	351	(32)
1994	→ Cambridge United (loan)	5	(0)
1997–1998	Leek Town	36	(1)
1998–2001	Newcastle Town		
Total		430	(34)

International career
1981	England Youth	6	(0)

Managerial career
- 1998: Leek Town (caretaker)
- 1998–2001: Newcastle Town
- * Club domestic league appearances and goals

Raymond Walker (born 28 September 1963) is an English former professional footballer who played as a midfielder. He played 444 games for Port Vale in all competitions between 1986 and 1997, ensuring himself a place in the club's history. He was twice the club's player of the season. He was named on the PFA Team of the Year three times. He was promoted twice with the club and also played a part in the club's highest-ever post-war finish in the English Football League. With Aston Villa in the early '80s, he joined Port Vale in 1986, after a short loan spell in 1984. After eleven years at Vale Park, he went into non-League football with Leek Town and Newcastle Town.

== Career ==
=== Aston Villa ===
Walker joined Aston Villa as an apprentice in July 1979 and turned professional in September 1981. He won the FA Youth Cup in 1980, when Villa defeated Manchester City 3–2. He found it impossible to break into the first-team at a club that had just won the 1982 European Cup final. He did, though make his First Division debut in the 1982–83 season in a 2–0 defeat at West Ham United. He featured under both Tony Barton and Graham Turner, but never got an extended run in the team.

=== Port Vale ===
Walker was loaned to Fourth Division Port Vale for two months at the start of the 1984–85 season. He played 15 games for John Rudge's side, scoring his first goal in professional football on 15 September in a 3–1 win over Torquay United at Plainmoor. He returned to Villa Park but failed to establish himself in the first-team. He returned to Port Vale (now in the Third Division) permanently in July 1986 for a fee of £12,000, plus 50% of any future sale above that amount (a fee settled by a tribunal). Aston Villa had demanded £25,000, whilst Port Vale could only afford to go to a maximum of £20,000. He played 54 games in 1986–87, scoring five goals. He was voted Player of the Year by the club's supporters in 1987–88, and was also selected by the PFA for the Third Division Team of the Year. These awards were handed to him for his performances during his 53-game season, with one of his seven goals coming from a long-range effort against Tottenham Hotspur in a celebrated FA Cup fourth round upset. He handed in a transfer request in June 1988, following rumours that the club had turned down an offer of £150,000 from Manchester City; his request was rejected – much to the disappointment of Stoke City manager Mick Mills.

Rudge claimed that Walker and Robbie Earle had one of the best-ever midfield partnerships at the Vale. The pair helped the club win promotion in 1988–89, both men being key players in the 1989 play-off final. Walker was also selected in the PFA Team of the Year for a second successive season, scoring six goals in 56 appearances. Despite this, he said, "Wait until next year. I had a bad season!" He helped the club to survive and prosper in the Second Division, and recovered from injury to post 47 appearances in 1989–90. He only scored one goal, though it came at a crucial time, helping the "Valiants" to record a 3–2 victory over top-flight Derby County at Pride Park in the FA Cup.

He was installed as the club's penalty-taker in 1990–91, and five of his seven goals came from the spot. His performances over his fifty games resulted in him being awarded the club's Player of the Year award once again in 1991, with only David Harris before him having been handed that honour twice. He was sidelined for five months with ligament damage in September 1991, and his absence during the 1991–92 was notable and was a factor in the club being relegated, with Vale finishing just five points from safety. He recovered to make 27 appearances throughout the season, his two goals coming from the spot. Walker was involved in the TNT Tournament win in the summer of 1992. He picked up a knee injury in April 1993 and although his performances 1992–93 saw him selected for that seasons PFA Second Division side of the year, he had to undergo a cruciate ligament operation in September 1993, which caused him to miss most of the 1993–94 season. At the end of the campaign, though, Vale were promoted into the First Division as Second Division runners-up.

He spent a brief five-game loan period with Second Division Cambridge United in September 1994 but managed to win his place back at Vale Park upon his return. However, he was struck down by another knee injury in March 1995. At that point, Ian Bogie was signed as his replacement. Walker scored two goals in 47 games in the 1995–96 season, both goals coming in a 4–3 win over Crystal Palace in an FA Cup third round replay. He played in the 1996 Anglo-Italian Cup final, as Vale lost 5–2 to Genoa. He made 19 appearances in 1996–97, as Vale posted their highest ever post-WW2 finish (eighth place in the second tier). He then left the club in May 1997. His many years with the "Valiants" entitled him to a testimonial game, which finished as an 8–6 defeat to Leicester City. Known by the nickname 'Razor'.

=== Later career ===
After leaving Port Vale, Walker spent time as a player-coach with Conference new boys Leek Town, including a five-game spell as caretaker manager from 17 March 1998. He played a total of 45 games in the 1997–98 season. Later that year he became player-manager at North West Counties League side Newcastle Town, where he remained until leaving to join the Crewe Alexandra academy in 2001. The "Castle" finished fourth in Division One in 1998–99, second in 1999–2000 and ninth in 2000–01. They also reached the semi-finals of the FA Vase in 1999–2000.

== Style of play ==
Known as the "Hoddle of the lower leagues", Walker was an expert passer. He boasted all the qualities of a top-flight midfielder, except pace. In May 2019, he was voted into the "Ultimate Port Vale XI" by members of the OneValeFan supporter website. In December 2025, supporters voted him onto the all-time Port Vale XI on the club's official website.

== Post-retirement ==
As of June 2011, Walker was working as Football in the Community Officer for Crewe Alexandra.

== Career statistics ==
Appearances and goals by club, season and competition
Club	Season	League			FA Cup		Other		Total	
Club	Season	Division	Apps	Goals	Apps	Goals	Apps	Goals	Apps	Goals
Aston Villa	1982–83	First Division	1	0	0	0	0	0	1	0
Aston Villa	1983–84	First Division	8	0	2	0	1	0	11	0
Aston Villa	1984–85	First Division	7	0	0	0	0	0	7	0
Aston Villa	1985–86	First Division	7	0	0	0	1	0	8	0
Aston Villa	Total		23	0	2	0	2	0	27	0
Port Vale (loan)	1984–85	Fourth Division	15	1	0	0	0	0	15	1
Port Vale	1986–87	Third Division	45	4	1	0	8	1	54	5
Port Vale	1987–88	Third Division	42	6	7	1	4	0	53	7
Port Vale	1988–89	Third Division	43	5	3	0	10	1	56	6
Port Vale	1989–90	Second Division	40	0	3	1	4	1	47	2
Port Vale	1990–91	Second Division	45	6	2	1	3	0	50	7
Port Vale	1991–92	Second Division	26	2	0	0	1	0	27	2
Port Vale	1992–93	Second Division	35	8	4	0	5	1	44	9
Port Vale	1993–94	Second Division	0	0	0	0	0	0	0	0
Port Vale	1994–95	First Division	23	1	2	0	1	0	26	1
Port Vale	1995–96	First Division	35	0	6	2	6	0	47	2
Port Vale	1996–97	First Division	17	0	0	0	2	0	19	0
Port Vale	Total		351	32	28	5	44	4	423	41
Cambridge United (loan)	1994–95	Second Division	5	0	0	0	2	0	7	0
Leek Town	1997–98	Conference National	36	1	1	0	8	0	45	1
Career total			430	34	31	5	56	4	517	43

== Honours ==
Aston Villa Youth

- FA Youth Cup: 1979–80

Port Vale

- Football League Third Division play-offs: 1989
- Football League Second Division second-place promotion: 1993–94
- Anglo-Italian Cup runner-up: 1995–96

Individual

- PFA Team of the Year: 1987–88 Third Division, 1988–89 Third Division, 1992–93 Second Division
- Port Vale Player of the Year: 1998–88, 1990–91
- Port Vale Hall of Fame: inducted 2026 (inaugural)
