= Mark Grew =

English footballer (born 1958)

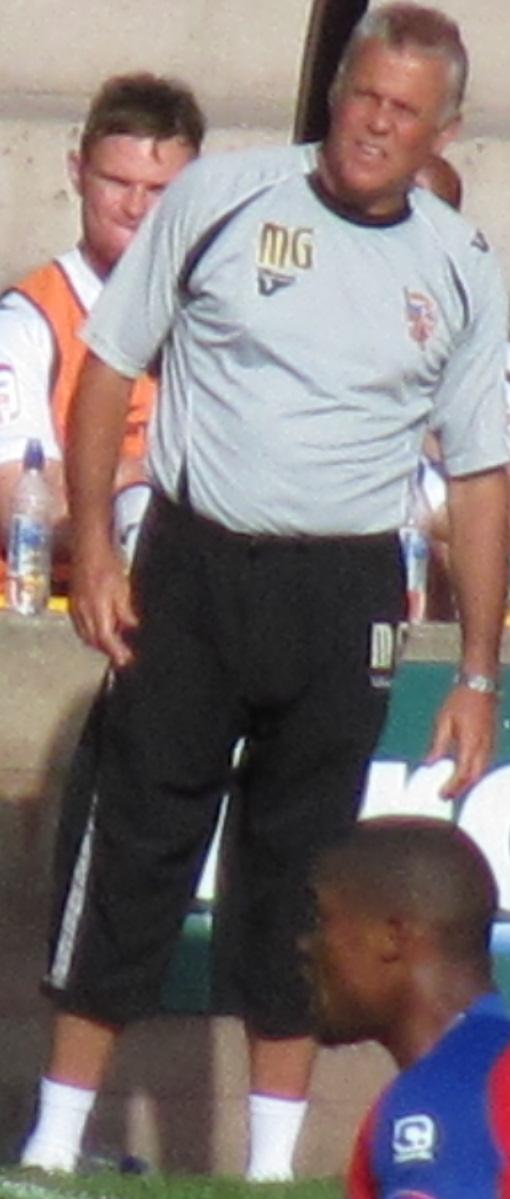
- Grew in 2010

Personal information
- Full name: Mark Stuart Grew
- Date of birth: 15 February 1958 (age 68)
- Place of birth: Bilston, England
- Height: 5 ft 10 in (1.78 m)
- Position: Goalkeeper

Youth career
- West Bromwich Albion

Senior career*
| Years | Team | Apps | (Gls) |
| 1976–1983 | West Bromwich Albion | 33 | (0) |
| 1978 | → Wigan Athletic (loan) | 4 | (0) |
| 1979 | → Notts County (loan) | 0 | (0) |
| 1983–1984 | Leicester City | 5 | (0) |
| 1983 | → Oldham Athletic (loan ) | 5 | (0) |
| 1984–1986 | Ipswich Town | 6 | (0) |
| 1985 | → Fulham (loan) | 4 | (0) |
| 1986 | → West Bromwich Albion (loan) | 1 | (0) |
| 1986 | → Derby County (loan) | 0 | (0) |
| 1986–1992 | Port Vale | 184 | (0) |
| 1990 | → Blackburn Rovers (loan) | 13 | (0) |
| 1992–1994 | Cardiff City | 21 | (0) |
| 1994–1995 | Hednesford Town | 1 | (0) |
| Total | | 277 | (0) |

Managerial career
- 1999: Port Vale (caretaker)
- 2010–2011: Port Vale (caretaker)
- 2011: Port Vale (caretaker)
- * Club domestic league appearances and goals

Mark Stuart Grew (born 15 February 1958) is an English former football player and coach who played as a goalkeeper.

His career started in 1976 with West Bromwich Albion, where he spent seven seasons as a backup keeper before moving on to Leicester City. After just a year with the "Foxes", he moved on to Ipswich Town. In 1986, he signed for Port Vale, where he became the first-choice goalkeeper. He spent six years at Vale Park, making almost 200 the Football League appearances, twice winning the club's Player of the Year award and playing in the 1989 Third Division play-off victory. He transferred to Cardiff City in 1992 and won the Third Division title with the club in 1992–93, and also picked up two Welsh Cup winners medals. His final club was Hednesford Town, whom he signed for in 1994 and left in 1995. Over the years he also enjoyed short loan spells with Wigan Athletic, Oldham Athletic, Fulham, and Blackburn Rovers.

After retiring as a player, he remained in the game, spending eight years as a coach at Port Vale before his sacking in 2002. He quickly returned to his coaching position at the club, though, and remains a key member of the backroom staff. He has had three spells as caretaker manager at the club.

== Playing career ==
=== Early career ===
Grew grew up in Bilston, where he attended the goalkeeping academy ran by legendary Wolverhampton Wanderers goalkeeper Bert Williams after accepting that he "was probably too fat and lazy to play outfield". He turned professional at First Division club West Bromwich Albion in the 1976–77 season, having just starred in the 1976 FA Youth Cup final, which ended in a 5–0 aggregate victory over Wolverhampton Wanderers. During the 1978–79 campaigned he was loaned out to Fourth Division newcomers Wigan Athletic, where he played four league games in the absence of John Brown. He returned to The Hawthorns, and played 33 league games for the "Baggies" as he faced competition from Tony Godden before he joined Leicester City, also of the First Division, for a £60,000 fee. He played five top-flight games for Gordon Milne's "Foxes" in the absence of Mark Wallington during the 1983–84 season. He also played five Second Division games on loan at Oldham Athletic, before he moved to First Division club Ipswich Town on a £60,000 transfer in March 1984. He spent two seasons with the "Tractor Boys", but played just six league games. He also played four Second Division games on loan at Fulham in 1985 and returned to West Brom on loan in 1986 to play one game.

=== Port Vale ===
In June 1986, he joined Third Division Port Vale; aged 28 years old, he was looking for first-team football. His debut for the club came in a 2–2 draw against Middlesbrough at Victoria Park, who were at the time close to folding. After he sustained an injury in the game, he suffered from damaged knee ligaments for much of the 1986–87 season. However, Alex Williams retired from back injury in September 1987. As Grew took the #1 jersey he never looked back and played fifty games in 1987–88.

Grew was then voted the club's Player of the Year for his performances over his 49 games in 1988–89. He played both legs of Vale's play-off final victory over Bristol Rovers, conceding just the one goal. He played 51 games in 1989–90, as Vale retained their Second Division status. On 31 March 1990, he saved penalties from both Julian Dicks and Jimmy Quinn to secure a 2–2 draw with West Ham United at the Boleyn Ground. However, he lost his place to Trevor Wood in August 1990. In October, he went on to enjoy a successful two-month loan spell with league rivals Blackburn Rovers, who had Terry Gennoe injured and Darren Collier out of form, playing 13 league games. He won his first-team spot back at Vale in February 1991 and played 14 games for the "Valiants" in 1990–91. He became the club's Player of the Year in 1992 for his ever-presence in the 53 game 1991–92 season. However, he left on a free transfer for Cardiff City in May 1992.

=== Later career ===
He was between the posts for Cardiff City when they beat Manchester City 1–0 in the FA Cup Fourth round on 29 January 1994. He became an "instant hero" with the Cardiff supporters after saving a penalty from Keith Curle. He joined non-League side Hednesford Town in 1994 after leaving Cardiff and made one appearance during the 1994–95 season.

== Style of play ==
He was a shot-stopping goalkeeper who mostly remained on his line and relied on his defenders to deal with crosses.

"A fine keeper who also brought professionalism and experience from his time at Ipswich and West Bromwich Albion. I'm not sure who gave him the title, but he quickly became John Rudge's voice of reason in the dressing room. Never short of something to say, he changed the whole culture of the club."

— Robbie Earle writing in 2012.

== Coaching career ==
Grew was appointed the Port Vale youth team coach in December 1994 and stayed with the club for the next eight years. He was appointed assistant manager under Brian Horton in 1999, until he was sacked in December 2002 by the club's administrators. In March 2003 he was appointed as an assistant manager at Stafford Rangers until he returned to Port Vale in a coaching capacity for the youth team after the club was taken over by Valiant 2001. Following a capitulation to Leyton Orient at Brisbane Road on 20 October 2007, Grew gave a memorable post-match interview, saying that the team was "gutless... spineless... the worst bunch of players I have seen at Vale Park in 17 years". On 8 October 2008, Grew rejected the opportunity to become assistant to recently appointed Port Vale manager Dean Glover.

In December 2010, he was made joint caretaker manager at Vale, along with Geoff Horsfield, following the departure of Micky Adams. Vale were hammered 5–0 by Rotherham United in his first game in charge, but rallied to beat Burton Albion 2–1, before Jim Gannon was appointed manager. During Adams' reign Grew had doubled up as a first-team coach. Still, when Gannon arrived at the club, Grew chose to focus solely on his role as youth team coach. Following Gannon's swift departure in March 2011, Grew was elevated to the position of caretaker manager for the third time in twelve years. Assisted by Horsfield, Marc Richards told the press that "it's absolutely brilliant that Grewy and Geoff are in charge again". After his first match back in charge ended in a 1–1 draw, Grew stated that if offered the job first time he would "seriously consider it". Defeat to bottom club Stockport County all but ended the club's promotion campaign, as well as Grew's hopes of a permanent appointment. He slammed both his players and the directors, claiming that "I was never in the picture to become the next manager".

Upon Adams' return as manager, he reshuffled the club's coaching set-up, and in July 2011, Grew was made assistant manager. In July 2014 his role changed to that of goalkeeping coach and scouting co-ordinator. He left the club in May 2015 as part of new manager's Rob Page's reshuffle of his backroom staff. He decided to take time out of football to undergo a back operation. He left the club following his testimonial match to honour his 25 years of service to the club.

== Personal life ==
Grew's daughter, Melissa (born 1992), is a model.

== Career statistics ==
=== Playing statistics ===
Appearances and goals by club, season and competition
| Club | Season | League | | | FA Cup | | Other (Note: Includes League Cup, Football League Trophy, Football League play-offs and Full Members Cup.) | | Total | |
| Club | Season | Division | Apps | Goals | Apps | Goals | Apps | Goals | Apps | Goals |
|---|---|---|---|---|---|---|---|---|---|---|
| West Bromwich Albion | 1978–79 | First Division | 0 | 0 | 0 | 0 | 1 | 0 | 1 | 0 |
| West Bromwich Albion | 1979–80 | First Division | 0 | 0 | 0 | 0 | 0 | 0 | 0 | 0 |
| West Bromwich Albion | 1980–81 | First Division | 0 | 0 | 0 | 0 | 0 | 0 | 0 | 0 |
| West Bromwich Albion | 1981–82 | First Division | 23 | 0 | 5 | 0 | 7 | 0 | 35 | 0 |
| West Bromwich Albion | 1982–83 | First Division | 10 | 0 | 0 | 0 | 1 | 0 | 11 | 0 |
| West Bromwich Albion | Total | | 33 | 0 | 5 | 0 | 9 | 0 | 47 | 0 |
| Wigan Athletic (loan) | 1978–79 | Fourth Division | 4 | 0 | 0 | 0 | 0 | 0 | 4 | 0 |
| Notts County (loan) | 1978–79 | Second Division | 0 | 0 | 0 | 0 | 0 | 0 | 0 | 0 |
| Leicester City | 1983–84 | First Division | 5 | 0 | 0 | 0 | 0 | 0 | 5 | 0 |
| Oldham Athletic (loan) | 1983–84 | Second Division | 5 | 0 | 0 | 0 | 1 | 0 | 6 | 0 |
| Ipswich Town | 1984–85 | First Division | 6 | 0 | 1 | 0 | 0 | 0 | 7 | 0 |
| Ipswich Town | 1985–86 | First Division | 0 | 0 | 0 | 0 | 0 | 0 | 0 | 0 |
| Ipswich Town | Total | | 6 | 0 | 1 | 0 | 0 | 0 | 7 | 0 |
| Fulham (loan) | 1985–86 | Second Division | 4 | 0 | 0 | 0 | 0 | 0 | 4 | 0 |
| West Bromwich Albion (loan) | 1985–86 | First Division | 1 | 0 | 0 | 0 | 0 | 0 | 1 | 0 |
| Derby County (loan) | 1985–86 | Third Division | 0 | 0 | 0 | 0 | 0 | 0 | 0 | 0 |
| Port Vale | 1986–87 | Third Division | 3 | 0 | 0 | 0 | 1 | 0 | 4 | 0 |
| Port Vale | 1987–88 | Third Division | 41 | 0 | 6 | 0 | 3 | 0 | 50 | 0 |
| Port Vale | 1988–89 | Third Division | 37 | 0 | 3 | 0 | 9 | 0 | 49 | 0 |
| Port Vale | 1989–90 | Second Division | 43 | 0 | 3 | 0 | 5 | 0 | 51 | 0 |
| Port Vale | 1990–91 | Second Division | 14 | 0 | 0 | 0 | 0 | 0 | 14 | 0 |
| Port Vale | 1991–92 | Second Division | 46 | 0 | 1 | 0 | 6 | 0 | 53 | 0 |
| Port Vale | Total | | 184 | 0 | 13 | 0 | 24 | 0 | 221 | 0 |
| Blackburn Rovers (loan) | 1990–91 | Second Division | 13 | 0 | 0 | 0 | 1 | 0 | 14 | 0 |
| Career total | | | 255 | 0 | 19 | 0 | 35 | 0 | 309 | 0 |

=== Managerial statistics ===
Managerial record by team and tenure
| Team | From | To | Record | | | | |
| Team | From | To | P | W | D | L | Win % |
|---|---|---|---|---|---|---|---|
| Port Vale (caretaker) | 18 January 1999 | 22 January 1999 | 0 | 0 | 0 | 0 | — |
| Port Vale (caretaker) | 30 December 2010 | 6 January 2011 | 2 | 1 | 0 | 1 | 50.0 |
| Port Vale (caretaker) | 21 March 2011 | 8 May 2011 | 10 | 2 | 4 | 4 | 20.0 |
| Total | | | 12 | 3 | 4 | 5 | 25.0 |

== Honours ==
=== As a player ===
West Bromwich Albion

- FA Youth Cup: 1976

Port Vale

- Football League Third Division play-offs: 1989

Cardiff City

- Football League Third Division: 1992–93
- Welsh Cup: 1992, 1993; runner-up: 1994

Individual

- Port Vale Player of the Year: 1989, 1992
