= Darren Hughes (English footballer) =

English footballer (born 1965)

Personal information
- Full name: Darren John Hughes
- Date of birth: 6 October 1965 (age 61)
- Place of birth: Prescot, England
- Height: 5 ft 11 in (1.80 m)
- Positions: Left-back; midfielder

Youth career
- 1979–1983: Everton

Senior career*
Years	Team	Apps	(Gls)
1983–1985	Everton	3	(0)
1985–1986	Shrewsbury Town	37	(1)
1986–1987	Brighton & Hove Albion	26	(2)
1987–1994	Port Vale	184	(4)
1995	Northampton Town	21	(0)
1995–1997	Exeter City	62	(1)
1997–1998	Morecambe		
1998–????	Newcastle Town		
Total		333	(8)
- * Club domestic league appearances and goals

Darren John Hughes (born 6 October 1965) is an English former footballer. A left-back noted for his pace, he made 386 league and cup appearances for six clubs over a 14-year career in the English Football League.

Starting his senior career at Everton in 1983, he was unable to make the grade at the First Division champions despite helping the youth team to lift the FA Youth Cup, and so was allowed to leave for Shrewsbury Town in June 1985. After one season with the "Shrews", he signed with Brighton & Hove Albion for a £35,000 fee in September 1986. In September 1987, he signed with Port Vale, where he spent seven years and made 184 league appearances. He helped the "Valiants" to win promotion out of the Third Division in 1989. He then spent January to November 1995 at Northampton Town, before transferring to Exeter City. After two seasons at Exeter, he moved into non-League football with Morecambe and Newcastle Town.

== Career ==
=== Everton ===
Hughes started his career at Everton, having first been scouted at the age of 11 and signed on schoolboy terms at age 14. He played in the FA Youth Cup final defeat to Norwich City in 1983, and the victory over Stoke City in the following year's final – he scored the winning goal against Stoke from well outside the penalty area. He signed his first professional contract in October 1983. As John Bailey's understudy, he made his first-team debut on 27 December 1983, in a 3–0 defeat to Wolverhampton Wanderers at Molineux. Hughes later developed a hernia and did not play again for six months. He played in the final two First Division games of the title-winning 1984–85 season: a 4–1 loss to Coventry City at Highfield Road and a 2–0 defeat to Luton Town at Kenilworth Road. Manager Howard Kendall allowed him to join Shrewsbury Town on a free transfer in June 1985.

=== Shrewsbury Town ===
He helped Chic Bates's "Shrews" to post a 17th-place finish in the Second Division in the 1985–86 season. Bates played him as a forward on the last day of the campaign, and Hughes scored from a free kick in a victory that relegated Middlesbrough.

=== Brighton & Hove Albion ===
Hughes left Gay Meadow on a £30,000 transfer to league rivals Brighton & Hove Albion in September 1986, two weeks after playing a game between the two clubs. He said he had been happy at Shrewsbury. Still, he felt that Brighton were a bigger club. He made his debut at the Goldstone Ground in a 3–0 defeat to Birmingham City in the Full Members' Cup on 1 October, and made his league debut for the club in a 1–0 home win over Stoke City three days later. However, the midfielder could not prevent the "Seagulls" from suffering relegation in last place in the 1986–87 season. Manager Alan Mullery was sacked in January, and Hughes retained his first-team place under the new boss Barry Lloyd, although results did not improve. Lloyd wanted to reduce his wages from £400 to £80-a-week and so Hughes agreed to leave the club.

=== Port Vale ===
Hughes joined John Rudge's Port Vale on loan in September 1987 before signing permanently for a £5,000 fee later that month. He claimed a goal against former employers Brighton in a 2–0 win at Vale Park on 28 September, and went on to make 53 appearances for the "Valiants" in the 1987–88 campaign. He was converted from central midfield to become the club's regular left-back. He played 56 games in the 1988–89 season, including both legs of the Third Division play-off final victory over Bristol Rovers. He then played 46 matches in the 1989–90 season, as Vale settled into the Second Division. Teammate and club legend Phil Sproson named him as the club's best left-back of the 1980s. However, he could only play 18 games in the 1990–91 season, as he suffered a hernia injury and underwent two operations to fix it; during his absence Nigerian loanee Reuben Agboola took his place. Hughes returned to fitness by April 1991. He made 49 appearances in the 1991–92 relegation season, and scored past Newcastle United in a 2–2 draw at St James' Park.

Hughes was diagnosed with a ruptured thigh muscle in July 1992 and again battled through two surgical procedures to correct it during the 1992–93 season; this caused him to miss the play-off final and Football League Trophy final. Medical scans later revealed a serious knee problem, and he blamed medical negligence on the part of the club for failing to treat the injury properly, saying that his knee had been injected with cortisone in a failed attempt to try and mask the problem and force through a transfer to Oldham Athletic. Still injured at the start of the 1993–94 season, he found, to his dismay, that the club released him in February 1994. He took the club to an industrial tribunal citing unfair dismissal, the result of which was a six-week trial in August 1994 to prove his 'fitness and ability'. He quit the club in November 1994 after being dissatisfied there and moved on to Northampton Town in January 1995.

=== Later career ===
He helped Ian Atkins's "Cobblers" to a 17th-place finish in the Third Division in 1994–95, before he left Sixfields to switch to Exeter City in November 1995. He made 62 Third Division appearances, as Peter Fox's "Grecians" struggled at the foot of the English Football League in 1995–96 and 1996–97. He then departed St James Park for Morecambe. He played ten games as he helped Jim Harvey's "Shrimpers" to a fifth-place finish in the Conference National in 1997–98. He left the Globe Arena and later played for Newcastle Town in the North West Counties League.

== Style of play ==
Hughes was a pacey left-back, though injuries prevented him from reaching his full potential. He spent his early career as a midfielder. He was nicknamed Yosser Hughes, after the character of the same name from the television series Boys from the Blackstuff.

== Later life ==
After retiring as a player, Hughes worked as a financial advisor, as a roofer, started a painting company, and spent time living in Australia before finally returning to the UK to run a construction business.

== Career statistics ==
Appearances and goals by club, season and competition
Club	Season	League			FA Cup		Other		Total	
Club	Season	Division	Apps	Goals	Apps	Goals	Apps	Goals	Apps	Goals
Everton	1983–84	First Division	1	0	0	0	0	0	1	0
Everton	1984–85	First Division	2	0	0	0	0	0	2	0
Everton	Total		3	0	0	0	0	0	3	0
Shrewsbury Town	1985–86	Second Division	31	1	1	0	5	0	37	1
Shrewsbury Town	1986–87	Second Division	6	0	0	0	3	0	9	0
Shrewsbury Town	Total		37	1	1	0	8	0	46	1
Brighton & Hove Albion	1986–87	Second Division	26	2	2	0	1	0	29	2
Port Vale	1987–88	Third Division	43	1	7	0	3	0	53	1
Port Vale	1988–89	Third Division	44	0	3	0	9	0	56	0
Port Vale	1989–90	Second Division	38	1	3	0	5	0	46	1
Port Vale	1990–91	Second Division	17	0	0	0	1	0	18	0
Port Vale	1991–92	Second Division	42	2	1	0	6	0	49	2
Port Vale	Total		184	4	11	3	24	0	219	7
Northampton Town	1994–95	Third Division	13	0	0	0	0	0	13	0
Northampton Town	1995–96	Third Division	8	0	0	0	1	0	9	0
Northampton Town	Total		21	0	0	0	1	0	22	0
Exeter City	1995–96	Third Division	26	0	1	0	0	0	27	0
Exeter City	1996–97	Third Division	36	1	1	0	3	0	40	1
Exeter City	Total		62	1	2	0	3	0	67	1
Career total			333	8	16	3	37	0	386	11

== Honours ==
Everton

- FA Youth Cup: 1984; runner-up: 1983

Port Vale

- Football League Third Division play-offs: 1989
