= Gary West =

English footballer

Personal information
- Full name: Gary West
- Date of birth: 25 August 1964 (age 62)
- Place of birth: Scunthorpe, England
- Height: 6 ft 2 in (1.88 m)
- Position: Central defender

Youth career
- Sheffield United

Senior career*
Years	Team	Apps	(Gls)
1982–1985	Sheffield United	75	(1)
1985–1987	Lincoln City	83	(4)
1987–1989	Gillingham	52	(3)
1989–1991	Port Vale	17	(1)
1990	→ Gillingham (loan)	1	(0)
1991	→ Lincoln City (loan)	3	(0)
1991–1992	Lincoln City	18	(1)
1992	→ Walsall (loan)	9	(1)
1992–1993	Boston United	9	(0)
Total		267+	(11+)

International career
1982	England Youth	3	(0)
- * Club domestic league appearances and goals

Gary West (born 25 August 1964) is an English former footballer. He made 250 appearances in the English Football League between 1982 and 1993, playing for numerous clubs, most notably Sheffield United, Lincoln City and Gillingham.

== Career ==
=== Sheffield United ===
West began his career with Sheffield United, playing 75 league games for the "Blades" between 1982 and 1985. The 1983–84 season saw the club promoted from the Third Division in third place. They consolidated their Second Division status the next season, though following this, West secured a £35,000 move to Lincoln City in August 1985.

=== Lincoln City ===
The "Imps" suffered relegation into the Fourth Division in 1985–86. They then crashed out of the Football League in 1986–87, finishing behind Torquay United thanks to their inferior goal difference; West was voted the club's Player of the Season.

=== Gillingham ===
West escaped Lincoln's fate of non-League football by signing with Gillingham of the Third Division for a £50,000 fee. He spent the 1987–88 and 1988–89 seasons with the "Gills". The club were relegation in his second season, West again escaped the fate of relegation, having been sold to Port Vale for £70,000 in February 1989.

=== Later career ===
His first Vale game was at Bramall Lane, a goalless draw on 28 February 1989. He played 14 games for the club that season, as well as playing both the semi-finals and the final of the play-offs. He struggled with cartilage troubles and played just three games for Vale the next season, instead being loaned out to old club Gillingham in November 1990. He played just one league game for the "Gills" in his one-month loan. In January 1991, he joined another old club on loan, staying a month at Sincil Bank, where he played three games. In August 1991 he joined Lincoln City permanently for £25,000. He played 18 league games for City in the 1991–92 season and also spent time on loan at Walsall before dropping into non-League football with Boston United.

== Career statistics ==
Appearances and goals by club, season and competition
Club	Season	League			FA Cup		Other		Total	
Club	Season	Division	Apps	Goals	Apps	Goals	Apps	Goals	Apps	Goals
Sheffield United	1982–83	Second Division	26	1	1	0	1	0	28	1
Sheffield United	1983–84	Second Division	24	0	5	0	2	0	31	0
Sheffield United	1984–85	Third Division	25	0	1	0	2	0	28	0
Sheffield United	Total		75	1	7	0	5	0	87	1
Lincoln City	1985–86	Third Division	38	2	1	0	3	0	42	2
Lincoln City	1986–87	Fourth Division	45	2	1	0	6	0	52	2
Lincoln City	Total		83	4	2	0	9	0	94	4
Gillingham	1987–88	Third Division	42	2	3	0	5	0	50	2
Gillingham	1988–89	Third Division	10	1	0	0	3	0	13	1
Gillingham	Total		52	3	3	0	8	0	63	3
Gillingham (loan)	1990–91	Fourth Division	1	0	0	0	1	0	2	0
Port Vale	1988–89	Third Division	14	1	0	0	3	0	17	1
Port Vale	1989–90	Second Division	3	0	0	0	0	0	3	0
Port Vale	1990–91	Second Division	0	0	0	0	0	0	0	0
Port Vale	Total		17	1	0	0	3	0	20	1
Lincoln City	1990–91	Fourth Division	3	0	0	0	0	0	3	0
Lincoln City	1991–92	Fourth Division	18	1	1	0	5	1	24	2
Lincoln City	Total		21	1	1	0	5	1	27	2
Walsall (loan)	1992–93	Third Division	9	1	1	0	2	0	12	1
Career total			258	11	14	0	33	1	305	12

== Honours ==
Sheffield United

- Football League Third Division third-place promotion: 1983–84

Port Vale

- Football League Third Division play-offs: 1989

Individual

- Lincoln City Player of the Season: 1986–87
