= List of Stockport County F.C. seasons =

Stockport County Football Club, a professional association football club based in Stockport, Greater Manchester, England, was founded in 1883 as Heaton Norris Rovers, they were renamed Stockport County in 1890 after the County Borough of Stockport. They joined The Combination for the 1891–92 season, and after three seasons they joined the Lancashire League in 1894. After six seasons in the Lancashire League, Stockport were elected to play in the Football League in 1900 and were placed in the Second Division. After failing to be re-elected into the Football League in 1904 they joined the Lancashire Combination for one season before re-joining the Football League. During their time in the Football League Stockport were relegated and promoted in various divisions on 14 occasions, with the club achieving their highest league placing after finishing in 8th place of the 1997–98 Football League First Division, when it was the second level of the English football league system. Stockport were relegated to the Conference National after finishing bottom of the League Two in the 2010–11 season, ending 106 years of Football League membership. After 11 seasons in non-League football, Stockport were champions of the 2021–22 National League and were promoted into EFL League Two.

Stockport County's furthest FA Cup run has seen them reach the fifth round on three occasions in 1934–35, 1949–50 and 2000–01. The furthest they have reached in the EFL Cup is the semi-finals in the 1996–97 edition. The club first participated in the EFL Trophy in 1983 when it was named the Associate Members' Cup; they were the runners-up in 1992 and 1993. Stockport entered four editions of the Football League Third Division North Cup between 1933 and 1937, winning the trophy in the 1934–35 season. After their exit from the Football League in 2011 Stockport were eligible to take part in the FA Trophy, their furthest run in this competition is reaching the semi-final on two occasions in 2018–19 and 2021–22.

== Key ==
Key to divisions

- Combination – The Combination
- Lancashire – Lancashire League
- Lanc Comb – Lancashire Combination
- Division 1 – Football League First Division
- Division 2 – Football League Second Division
- Division 3 – Football League Third Division
- Division 3N – Football League Third Division North
- Division 4 – Football League Fourth Division
- League 1 – Football League One
- League 2 – Football League Two
- Conference – Football Conference
- Conference N – Conference North
- National – National League
- National N – National League North

Key to rounds

- PR – Preliminary round
- QR1 – First qualifying round, etc.
- Group – Group stage
- R1 – First round, etc.
- R1(N) – First round Northern section, etc.
- QF – Quarter-finals
- QF(N) – Quarter-final Northern section
- SF – Semi-finals
- SF(N) – Semi-final Northern section
- RU – Runners-up
- RU(N) – Runners-up Northern section
- W – Winner

Key to positions and symbols

- 1st – Champions
- 2nd – Runners-up
- ↑ – Promoted
- ↓ – Relegated
- † – Top or joint-top league scorer in Stockport's division
- — – Stockport did not enter the competition

== Seasons ==
List of seasons, including league division and statistics, cup results and top scorer
Season	League record									FA Cup	EFL Cup (Note: The EFL Cup competition started in the 1960–61 season.)	Other		Top scorer (Note: Includes goals scored in league games (including play-offs), FA Cup, Football League Third Division North Cup, Football League Cup/EFL Cup, Associate Members' Cup/Football League Trophy and FA Trophy.)	
Season	Division	P	W	D	L	F	A	Pts	Pos	FA Cup	EFL Cup	Competition	Result	Name	Goals
1891–92	Combination	22	7	2	13	29	44	16	11th	—	—	—	—	G. Perry	7
1892–93	Combination	22	8	6	8	38	35	22	6th	QR2	—	—	—	E. Grecock	11
1893–94	Combination	18	7	6	5	33	32	20	4th	R1	—	—	—	Hewitt (Note: This is the top scorer's surname, their first name is to be confirmed.)	11
1894–95	Lancashire	26	10	5	11	53	69	25	9th	QR2	—	—	—	Robert Mann	10
1895–96	Lancashire	30	13	3	14	56	70	29	12th	QR2	—	—	—	G. Smith	12
1896–97	Lancashire	28	15	1	12	52	42	31	9th	QR2	—	—	—	Rimmer Brown; G. Smith	13
1897–98	Lancashire	26	15	4	7	60	27	34	3rd	QR5	—	—	—	William Foster	21
1898–99	Lancashire	24	12	2	10	48	42	26	6th	QR5	—	—	—	William Foster	21
1899–1900	Lancashire	28	21	3	4	80	23	45	1st	QR4	—	—	—	Frank Chesworth	19
1900–01	Division 2 (Note: Stockport County were elected to the Football League Second Division for the 1900–01 season.)	34	11	3	20	38	68	25	17th	QR4	—	—	—	William Foster	10
1901–02	Division 2	34	8	7	19	36	72	23	17th	QR5	—	—	—	Joe Davies	8
1902–03	Division 2	34	7	6	21	39	74	20	17th	QR2	—	—	—	Issac Evenson	7
1903–04	Division 2	34	8	11	15	40	72	27	16th	QR4	—	—	—	Joe Raby	9
1904–05	Lanc Comb (Note: Stockport County were not re-elected into the Football League Second Division and joined the Lancashire Combination for the 1904–05 season.)	34	21	7	6	63	28	49	1st	QR6	—	—	—	Tommy Green	16
1905–06	Division 2 (Note: Stockport County were elected back into the Football League Second Division for the 1905–06 season.)	38	13	9	16	44	56	35	10th	R1	—	—	—	Robert Manson	11
1906–07	Division 2	38	12	11	15	42	52	35	12th	R1	—	—	—	Fred Crump; James Pass	11
1907–08	Division 2	38	12	8	18	48	67	32	13th	R1	—	—	—	Fred Crump	11
1908–09	Division 2	38	14	3	21	39	71	31	18th	R2	—	—	—	Benjamin Whitehouse	13
1909–10	Division 2	38	13	8	17	50	47	34	13th	R2	—	—	—	Francis Kelly; Benjamin Whitehouse	10
1910–11	Division 2	38	11	8	19	47	79	30	17th	QR4	—	—	—	Richard Prout	17
1911–12	Division 2	38	11	11	16	47	54	33	16th	R1	—	—	—	Norman Rodgers	11
1912–13	Division 2	38	8	10	20	56	78	26	19th	R1	—	—	—	Norman Rodgers	19
1913–14	Division 2	38	13	10	15	55	57	36	12th	QR4	—	—	—	Norman Rodgers	12
1914–15	Division 2	38	15	7	16	54	60	37	14th	R1	—	—	—	Norman Rodgers	21
1915–19	No competitive football was played between 1915 and 1919 due to the First World War.														
1919–20	Division 2	42	14	9	19	52	61	37	16th	R1	—	—	—	Harry Crossthwaite; Arthur Metcalf; Norman Rodgers	13
1920–21	Division 2 ↓	42	9	12	21	42	75	30	22nd	R1	—	—	—	Albert Waterall	8
1921–22	Division 3N ↑	38	24	8	6	60	21	56	1st	QR5	—	—	—	Joseph O'Kane	12
1922–23	Division 2	42	14	8	20	43	58	36	20th	QR5	—	—	—	Tommy Green	16
1923–24	Division 2	42	13	16	13	44	52	42	13th	QR6	—	—	—	Wilf Woodcock	8
1924–25	Division 2	42	13	11	18	37	57	37	19th	R2	—	—	—	Tommy Meads	10
1925–26	Division 2 ↓	42	8	9	25	51	97	25	22nd	R3	—	—	—	Tommy Mitchell	9
1926–27	Division 3N	42	22	7	13	93	69	49 (Note: Stockport County deducted 2 points for fielding an ineligible player.)	6th	R1	—	—	—	Harry Burgess	28
1927–28	Division 3N	42	23	8	11	89	51	54	3rd	R2	—	—	—	Joe Smith (Note: Scored 38 goals in the Third Division North.)	40 †
1928–29	Division 3N	42	28	6	8	111	58	62	2nd	R3	—	—	—	Harry Burgess	32
1929–30	Division 3N	42	28	7	7	106	44	63	2nd	R3	—	—	—	Frank Newton (Note: Scored 36 goals in the Third Division North.)	38 †
1930–31	Division 3N	42	20	9	13	77	61	49	7th	R2	—	—	—	Frank Newton	37
1931–32	Division 3N	40	13	11	16	55	53	37	12th	R1	—	—	—	Joe Griffiths	11
1932–33	Division 3N	42	21	12	9	99	58	54	3rd	R2	—	—	—	Joe Griffiths	21
1933–34	Division 3N	42	24	11	7	115	52	59	3rd	R2	—	Football League Third Division North Cup	RU	Alf Lythgoe (Note: Scored 46 goals in the Third Division North.)	52 †
1934–35	Division 3N	42	22	3	17	90	72	47	7th	R5	—	Football League Third Division North Cup	W	Joseph Hill	17
1935–36	Division 3N	42	20	8	14	65	49	48	5th	R3	—	Football League Third Division North Cup	R1	Joseph Hill	19
1936–37	Division 3N ↑	42	23	14	5	84	39	60	1st	R1	—	Football League Third Division North Cup	R2	Joseph Hill	23
1937–38	Division 2 ↓	42	11	9	22	43	70	31	22nd	R3	—	—	—	Jimmy Smailes	7
1938–39	Division 3N	42	17	9	16	91	77	43	9th	R4	—	—	—	Charles Sargeant	23
1939–40	Division 3N	2	0	0	2	0	5	0	22nd (Note: When the Second World War began, the 1939–40 Football League season was abandoned with three matches played.)	—	—	—	—	—	0
1939–45	No competitive football was played between 1939 and 1945 due to the Second World War.														
1945–46	—									R1 (Note: From the first round proper to the sixth round of the 1945–46 FA Cup, matches were played over two legs.)	—	—	—	Eric Hyde; Kenneth Shaw	1
1946–47	Division 3N	42	24	2	16	78	53	50	4th	R3	—	—	—	Kenneth Shaw	17
1947–48	Division 3N	42	13	12	17	63	67	38	17th	R4	—	—	—	Tommy Barkas	15
1948–49	Division 3N	42	16	11	15	61	56	43	8th	R3	—	—	—	Thomas Swinscoe	16
1949–50	Division 3N	42	19	7	16	55	52	45	10th	R5	—	—	—	David Herd	19
1950–51	Division 3N	46	20	8	18	63	63	48	10th	R4	—	—	—	Andy Black	18
1951–52	Division 3N	46	23	13	10	74	40	59	3rd	R1	—	—	—	Jack Connor; Allen Oliver	15
1952–53	Division 3N	46	17	13	16	82	69	47	11th	R3	—	—	—	Jack Connor	31
1953–54	Division 3N	46	18	11	17	77	67	47	10th	R3	—	—	—	Jack Connor	34
1954–55	Division 3N	46	18	12	16	84	70	48	9th	R1	—	—	—	Jack Connor (Note: Scored 30 goals in the Third Division North.)	30 †
1955–56	Division 3N	46	21	9	16	90	61	51	7th	R1	—	—	—	Jack Connor	30
1956–57	Division 3N	46	23	8	15	91	75	54	5th	R1	—	—	—	Ray Drake	19
1957–58	Division 3N	46	18	11	17	74	67	47	9th	R4	—	—	—	Bill Holden	20
1958–59	Division 3 ↓	46	13	10	23	65	78	36	21st	R3	—	—	—	Arnold Jackson	12
1959–60	Division 4	46	19	11	16	58	54	49	10th	R2	—	—	—	Michael Davock	13
1960–61	Division 4	46	18	9	19	57	66	45	13th	R4	R2	—	—	Tommy Anderson	15
1961–62	Division 4	44	17	9	18	70	69	43	16th	R1	R1	—	—	Charlie McDonnell	16
1962–63	Division 4	46	15	11	20	56	70	41	19th	R1	R1	—	—	Charlie McDonnell	16
1963–64	Division 4	46	15	12	19	50	68	42	17th	R1	R1	—	—	John Evans; Hugh Ryden	9
1964–65	Division 4	46	10	7	29	44	87	27	24th	R4	R1	—	—	Derek Hodgkinson	11
1965–66	Division 4	46	18	6	22	71	70	42	13th	R2	R1	—	—	Len White	15
1966–67	Division 4 ↑	46	26	12	8	69	42	64	1st	R1	R1	—	—	Herbert Lister	11
1967–68	Division 3	46	19	9	18	70	75	47	13th	R1	R2	—	—	Bill Atkins; Jim Fryatt	22
1968–69	Division 3	46	16	14	16	67	68	46	9th	R3	R2	—	—	Bill Atkins	20
1969–70	Division 3 ↓	46	6	11	29	27	71	23	24th	R2	R1	—	—	John Rowlands	9
1970–71	Division 4	46	16	14	16	49	65	46	11th	R1	R1	—	—	Sammy McMillan	17
1971–72	Division 4	46	9	14	23	55	87	32	23rd	R2	R2	—	—	Sammy McMillan	14
1972–73	Division 4	46	18	12	16	53	53	48	11th	R3	R4	—	—	John Griffiths; Ian Lawther	13
1973–74	Division 4	46	7	20	19	44	69	34	24th	R1	R3	—	—	Mick Hollis	15
1974–75	Division 4	46	12	14	20	43	70	38	20th	R1	R1	—	—	Mick Hollis	11
1975–76	Division 4	46	13	12	21	43	76	38	21st	R1	R1	—	—	Wyn Davies; Mick Hollis	7
1976–77	Division 4	46	13	19	14	53	57	45	14th	R1	R3	—	—	Barney Daniels	19
1977–78	Division 4	46	16	10	20	56	56	42	18th	R2	R1	—	—	Eddie Prudham	13
1978–79	Division 4	46	14	12	20	58	60	40	17th	R3	R2	—	—	Stuart Lee	24
1979–80	Division 4	46	14	12	20	48	72	40	16th	R1	R2	—	—	Phil Henson; Eddie Prudham	9
1980–81	Division 4	46	16	7	23	44	57	39	20th	R1	R3	—	—	Les Bradd	11
1981–82	Division 4	46	12	13	21	48	67	49	18th	R2	R1	—	—	Oshor Williams	11
1982–83	Division 4	46	14	12	20	60	79	54	16th	R1	R1	—	—	Micky Quinn	24
1983–84	Division 4	46	17	11	18	60	64	62	12th	R1	R2	Associate Members' Cup	R1(N)	Micky Quinn	17
1984–85	Division 4	46	13	8	25	58	79	47	22nd	R1	R2	Associate Members' Cup	R1(N)	Tommy Sword	12
1985–86	Division 4	46	17	13	16	63	71	64	11th	R1	R1	Associate Members' Cup	PR(N)	Mark Leonard	23
1986–87	Division 4	46	13	12	21	40	69	51	19th	R1	R2	Associate Members' Cup	PR(N)	Vernon Allatt	10
1987–88	Division 4	46	12	15	19	44	58	51	20th	R3	R1	Associate Members' Cup	PR(N)	Bob Colville	18
1988–89	Division 4	46	10	21	15	54	52	51	20th	R1	R1	Associate Members' Cup	PR(N)	Rodger Wylde	14
1989–90	Division 4	46	21	11	14	68	62	74	4th	R1	R2	Associate Members' Cup	QF(N)	Brett Angell (Note: Scored 23 goals in the Fourth Division.)	28 †
1990–91	Division 4 ↑	46	23	13	10	84	47	82	2nd	R1	R1	Associate Members' Cup	R1(N)	Paul Williams	16
1991–92	Division 3	46	22	10	14	75	51	76	5th (Note: Beat Stoke City 2–1 on aggregate in the semi-final before losing 2–1 to Peterborough United in the 1992 Football League Third Division play-off final.)	R2	R1	Associate Members' Cup	RU	Kevin Francis	26
1992–93	Division 2 (Note: The Third Division was renamed Division Two after the Premier League broke away from the Football League.)	46	19	15	12	81	57	72	6th (Note: Lost in the play-off semi-final to Port Vale 2–1 on aggregate.)	R3	R2	Football League Trophy	RU	Kevin Francis	39
1993–94	Division 2	46	24	13	9	74	44	85	4th (Note: Beat York City 1–0 on aggregate in the semi-final before losing 2–1 to Burnley in the 1994 Football League Second Division play-off final.)	R4	R1	Football League Trophy	SF(N)	Kevin Francis	34
1994–95	Division 2	46	19	8	19	63	60	65	11th	R1	R2	Football League Trophy	QF(N)		
1995–96	Division 2	46	19	13	14	61	47	70	9th	R3	R3	Football League Trophy	R1(N)		
1996–97	Division 2 ↑	46	23	13	10	59	41	82	2nd	R4	SF	Football League Trophy	RU(N)		
1997–98	Division 1	46	19	8	19	71	69	65	8th (Note: Highest finish in the English football league system.)	R4	R2	—	—		
1998–99	Division 1	46	12	17	17	49	60	53	16th	R4	R1	—	—	Brett Angell	18
1999–2000	Division 1	46	13	15	18	55	67	54	17th	R3	R2	—	—	Tony Dinning	13
2000–01	Division 1	46	11	18	17	58	65	51	19th	R5	R1	—	—	Aaron Wilbraham	12
2001–02	Division 1 ↓	46	6	8	32	42	102	26	24th	R3	R2	—	—	Luke Beckett; Scott Taylor	7
2002–03	Division 2	46	15	10	21	65	70	55	14th	R2	R2	Football League Trophy	R2(N)	Luke Beckett	29
2003–04	Division 2	46	11	19	16	62	70	52	19th	R1	R2	Football League Trophy	QF(N)	Rickie Lambert	13
2004–05	League 1 ↓	46	6	8	32	49	98	26	24th	R2	R1	Football League Trophy	R2(N)	Warren Feeney	17
2005–06	League 2	46	11	19	16	57	78	52	22nd	R3	R1	Football League Trophy	R1(N)	Jermaine Easter	11
2006–07	League 2	46	21	8	17	65	54	71	8th	R2	R1	Football League Trophy	R2(N)	Anthony Elding	11
2007–08	League 2 ↑	46	24	10	12	72	54	82	4th (Note: Promoted to Football League One via the play-offs, beating Wycombe Wanderers 2–1 on aggregate in the semi-final and Rochdale 3–2 in the 2008 Football League Two play-off final.)	R1	R2	Football League Trophy	SF(N)	Liam Dickinson	21
2008–09	League 1	46	16	12	18	59	57	50 (Note: Stockport County deducted 10 points for entering administration.)	18th	R2	R1	Football League Trophy	R2(N)	Tommy Rowe	7
2009–10	League 1 ↓	46	5	10	31	35	95	25	24th	R2	R1	Football League Trophy	R2(N)	Carl Baker	13
2010–11	League 2 ↓	46	9	14	23	48	96	41	24th	R1	R1	Football League Trophy	R2(N)	Greg Tansey	11
2011–12	Conference	46	12	15	19	58	74	51	16th	QR4	—	FA Trophy	R1	Tom Elliott; Danny Rowe	8
2012–13	Conference ↓	46	13	11	22	57	76	50	21st	R1	—	FA Trophy	R2		
2013–14	Conference N	42	12	14	16	58	57	50	14th (Note: Lowest finish in the English football league system.)	QR3	—	FA Trophy	QR3		
2014–15	Conference N	42	16	9	17	56	59	57	11th	QR4	—	FA Trophy	R2		
2015–16	National N (Note: The Football Conference was renamed the National League; the North and South divisions were also renamed National League North and National League South.)	42	15	14	13	50	49	59	9th	QR2	—	FA Trophy	QR3		
2016–17	National N	42	19	16	7	59	41	73	8th	R1	—	FA Trophy	R2		
2017–18	National N	42	20	9	13	75	57	69	5th (Note: Lost in the play-off qualifying round to Chorley 1–0.)	QR3	—	FA Trophy	QF		
2018–19	National N ↑	42	24	10	8	77	36	82	1st	R2	—	FA Trophy	SF		
2019–20	National	39	16	10	13	51	54	58	8th (Note: The 2019–20 season was disrupted by the effects of the COVID-19 pandemic. The National League was suspended in mid-March 2020 and the clubs voted six weeks later to end the regular season programme. Teams had not all played the same number of matches, so it was agreed to construct final league tables on an unweighted points per game basis.)	QR4	—	FA Trophy	R2	Elliot Osborne	9
2020–21	National	42	21	14	7	69	32	77	3rd (Note: Lost in the play-off semi-final to Hartlepool United 1–0.)	R3	—	FA Trophy	R4	John Rooney	21
2021–22	National ↑	44	30	4	10	87	38	94	1st	R2	—	FA Trophy	SF	Paddy Madden	25
2022–23	League 2	46	22	13	11	65	37	79	4th (Note: Beat Salford City in the semi-final before losing to Carlisle United 3–1 in a penalty shoot-out in the 2023 EFL League Two play-off final after the match had ended 1–1 after extra time.)	R3	R2	EFL Trophy	Group	Kyle Wootton	14
2023–24	League 2 ↑	46	27	11	8	96	48	92	1st	R2	R1	EFL Trophy	R2	Paddy Madden	22
2024–25	League 1	46	25	12	9	72	42	87	3rd (Note: Lost in the play-off semi-final to Leyton Orient 4–1 in a penalty shoot-out after the two-legs ended 3–3 on aggregate.)	R3	R1	EFL Trophy	R2	Louie Barry	16
2025–26	League 1	46	22	11	13	71	58	77	3rd (Note: Lost to Bolton Wanderers 4-1 in the play-off final)	R2	R2	EFL Trophy	RU	Kyle Wootton	20
