= 1993 Football League Trophy final =

1993 Autoglass Trophy final
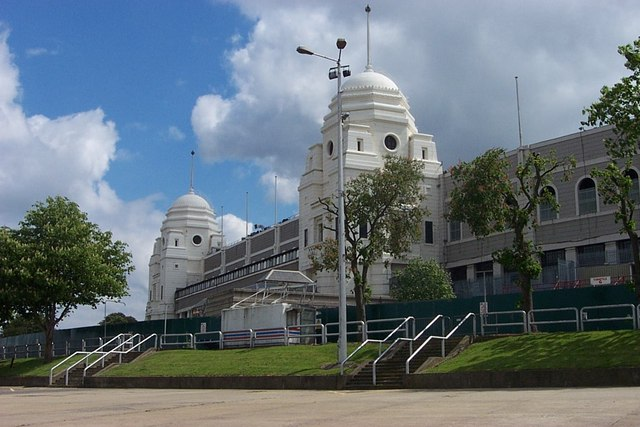
- The Twin Towers of Wembley Stadium
- Event: 1992–93 Football League Trophy
Port Vale	Stockport County
2	1
- Date: 22 May 1993
- Venue: Wembley Stadium, London
- Man of the Match: Bernie Slaven / Peter Swan
- Referee: David Elleray (Harrow)
- Attendance: 35,885
- Weather: Sunny

The 1993 Football League Trophy final was a football match between Port Vale and Stockport County on 22 May 1993 at Wembley Stadium, London. It was the final match of the 1992–93 Football League Trophy, the 10th season of what had previously been called the Associate Members' Cup, a cup competition for teams from the Second Division and Third Division of the Football League (the third and fourth tiers of the English football league system). Stockport were beaten finalists in the 1992 Associate Members' Cup final, whereas it was Port Vale's first final in the competition and first appearance at Wembley.

Both sides had to advance past a group stage and then four knock-out rounds to reach the final, though Vale were one of four teams drawn at random to receive byes past the group stage. Vale then came from behind in extra time to beat Fulham in the second round, eased past Northampton Town, beat Potteries derby rivals Stoke City, and finally overcame Exeter City over two legs. Stockport County made short work of Chesterfield and Chester City in the group stages, before reaching the final with wins over Hartlepool United, Bradford City, Chesterfield (again) and Wigan Athletic. Both teams had competed in the Second Division play-off semi-finals earlier in the week, with Port Vale winning the tie 2–1 on aggregate.

Port Vale won the match 2–1 with Paul Kerr and Bernie Slaven putting them two goals up at half-time and a 66th-minute strike from Kevin Francis proving to be little more than a consolation. The introduction of second-half substitute Andy Preece had turned the game in County's favour, with Vale having the better of the play and chances before his arrival. Slaven was named by Sky TV as man of the match, having provided Kerr with the assist for the opening goal on 4 minutes and then scoring the game's decisive goal after first beating three defenders on the 37-minute mark. Vale would go on to lose to West Bromwich Albion in the play-off final eight days later, but would secure an automatic promotion place the following season. For Stockport the loss would prove to be the third Wembley defeat in the space of four years; they would go on to lose in the 1994 Second Division play-off final, having lost a 1992 play-off final and the 1992 Associate Members' Cup final.

== Route to the final ==
The Football League Trophy is a football competition for clubs in the third and fourth tier of the English Football League. Due to the creation of the Premier League in 1992, the third and fourth tiers of the English football league system were called the Second Division and Third Division. The final was scheduled a week before the play-off finals and only three days after the play-off semi-finals. The tournament was split into two sections: North and South, with Stockport County coming through the north section and Port Vale through the southern section. The first round consisted of seven groups of three teams in each section, with two clubs in each section receiving byes. Port Vale were fortunate enough to receive a bye into the second round. The area finals were two legged games, home and away, with the winners of each section going into the overall final.

=== Port Vale ===
Round	Opposition	Score
2nd	Fulham	4–3 (h)
QF	Northampton Town	4–2 (h)
SF	Stoke City	1–0 (a)
finals	Exeter City	2–1 (h); 1–1 (a)
Key: QF = quarter-finals; SF = semi-finals (h) = Home venue; (a) = Away venue.

Port Vale received a bye for the first round and so did not take part in the group stages. In the second round they had a home tie with Fulham on 12 January; the visitors were difficult opponents, having held the Vale to a 0–0 draw at Vale Park on the opening day of the 1992–93 league season. The match went into extra time and Fulham then scored to hold a 3–2 lead, however, a brace from Dean Glover turned the tie around and gave Vale a 4–3 victory. They then faced struggling Third Division side Northampton Town in the quarter-finals, also at home. Vale recorded a 4–2 win over the "Cobblers", with Peter Swan, Mark Smith, Paul Kerr and Ray Walker scoring a goal each.

In the area semi-finals they had to overcome Potteries derby rivals Stoke City – who would go on to be crowned Second Division champions – in front of a crowd of 22,267 at the Victoria Ground on 3 March. Stoke had won the league encounter at the Victoria Ground back in October by two goals to one, with the return fixture due to the played at the end of March. The two clubs had also met in the first round of the FA Cup in November, drawing 0–0 at the Victoria Ground, before Vale won the replay 3–1 thanks for a brace from Martin Foyle; the game was best remembered for a patch of mud however, which stopped a certain goal from Dave Regis from levelling the score at 2–2. The Football League Trophy tie was therefore the fourth of five meeting between the two sides that season; Mark Stein missed a first-half penalty for the "Potters", Robin van der Laan scored the only goal of the game in the second half and later said "the goal has to go down as one of my most important strikes".

They then needed to get past Exeter City over two legs to reach the tournament final, a team they had drawn 2–2 with back in September at Burslem. The home leg took place first on 16 March, where a penalty from Kerr on 16 minutes was cancelled out by a long-range strike from Danny Bailey 21 minutes later; Steve Moran missed a chance to give Exeter the lead in the second half, before Ian Taylor headed in a Kevin Kent cross on 74 minutes to give Vale a 2–1 lead to defend at St James Park. Opposition manager Alan Ball said that: "Port Vale played all the football so I am absolutely delighted that we go into the next game only one down". The away leg was over a month later on 21 April, and seemed to be heading for extra-time when Exeter took the lead on the hour mark, only for new signing Bernie Slaven to level the match at 1–1 on 73 minutes. After the game Port Vale manager John Rudge said that: "On a night like this, all you are looking for is the result and the lads have managed to do that – and I am proud of them." Port Vale advanced into the final with a 3–2 aggregate victory.

=== Stockport County ===
Round	Opposition	Score
1st	Chesterfield	3–0 (a)
1st	Chester City	2–0 (h)
2nd	Hartlepool United	1–0 (h)
QF	Bradford City	4–3 (a)
SF	Chesterfield	2–1 (h)
finals	Wigan Athletic	1–2 (a); 2–0 (h)
Key: QF = quarter-finals; SF = semi-finals (h) = Home venue; (a) = Away venue.

Stockport County were placed in group six of the northern section, along with Chesterfield and Chester City. County picked up a 3–0 win over Third Division Chesterfield at Saltergate and a 2–0 win at home to Chester, who would go on to finish bottom of the Second Division. Stockport therefore went into the next round as group winners, with Chesterfield also qualifying after they beat Chester 1–0 to claim second-place. On 12 January, Stockport recorded a 1–0 home victory over Second Division club Hartlepool United. They faced a challenging fixture for the area quarter-finals in Second Division play-off chasers Bradford City at Valley Parade, but progressed with a 4–3 victory. County faced Chesterfield again in the semi-finals, and won 2–1 to this time eliminate them from the competition.

In the area finals they drew Wigan Athletic, who would end the season relegated out of the Second Division. The first leg was at Springfield Park on 16 March, and Wigan won 2–1. Stockport needed to turn the tie around the following month at Edgeley Park and succeeded with a 2–0 win to advance into the tournament final with a 3–2 aggregate victory.

== Pre-match ==
The final was the third time the two clubs had met in seven days. Vale had edged out Stockport 2–1 on aggregate in the Second Division play-off semi-finals. They had drawn 1–1 at Stockport's Edgeley Park, Glover the scorer for the "Valiants", before Foyle scored the only goal of the return leg at Vale Park. This meant that Vale would return to Wembley seven days after the Football League Trophy final to take on West Bromwich Albion in the play-off final. The two teams had also met in the league earlier in the season, playing out a goalless draw at Vale Park in August, whilst Stockport had won 2–0 at Edgeley Park in February. The match was to be the second Football League Trophy final in two years to see Stockport line up against a Stoke-on-Trent team, as they lost the previous year's final 1–0 to Stoke City. The 1992 final was the only time either club had ever reached a Football League Trophy final. It was the first time Port Vale had visited Wembley Stadium. The match took place on 22 May, two days after Arsenal defeated Sheffield Wednesday in the 1993 FA Cup final.

Port Vale had a reputation as a team that liked to play football on the ground, whereas Stockport had a more direct style. The referee was David Elleray, a Premier League and FIFA listed official. Port Vale's Swan was a doubt for the game after struggling with injury, as was veteran midfielder Ray Walker, and though Swan managed to start the game, Walker was ruled out. The midfield remained one of Vale's strong points though as Taylor and Van der Laan were in fine form, with Kerr linking strikers Slaven and Foyle up front. The Vale defence was also solid, with goalkeeper Paul Musselwhite lined up behind an experienced defence that included captain Dean Glover and Neil Aspin.

== Match summary ==
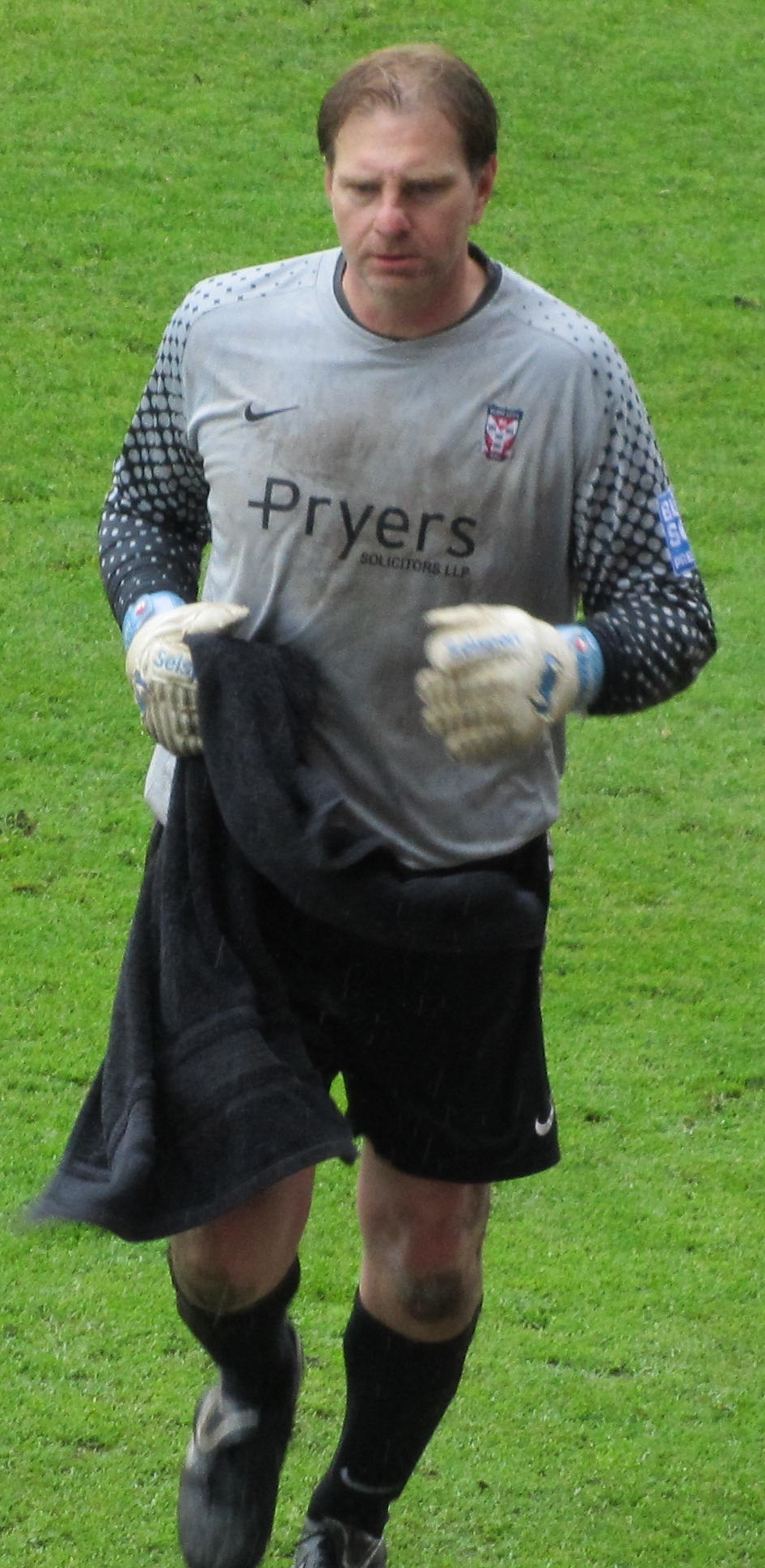
Paul Musselwhite made a number of saves in the Port Vale goal.

=== First-half ===
Stockport had the first chance, only to have Chris Beaumont denied by a well timed tackle from Swan. Kerr then struck the opening goal of the game in the 4th minute; Slaven started the movement as he collected a loose ball in the centre of the park and hit a through ball past Dave Miller and Lee Todd for Kerr to sprint on and slot home his 14th of the season. Van der Laan continued the Valiants spell of pressure, hitting a shot just wide of the goal not long after. In the 37th minute, Vale doubled their lead when Glover put in a cross, which Foyle turned into the path of Slaven, who burst past three defenders before he directed it to the left of the helpless Neil Edwards. Before the half-time whistle came, Jim Gannon earned the first yellow card of the game.

=== Second-half ===
Vale nearly had the game wrapped up before Stockport got back into the game; four minutes after the restart Kerr set Andy Porter free, Porter beat Edwards but Mick Wallace saved the day at the expense of a corner. Substitute Andy Preece was effective right from his introduction, allowing 6 ft 7 in (2.01 m) Kevin Francis more room up front. Francis forced the ball from Vale keeper Musselwhite's hands and forced him into a double save. The mounting pressure from County paid dividends in the 66th minute; on-loan player Peter Duffield guided a ball into the box, which Francis directed it over Musselwhite's head and into the net. Sensing a chance of an equaliser, Stockport stepped up the pace, frustrating their opposition. Kerr was booked for a trip on Peter Ward and in the six minutes of injury-time Swan and Francis went into the book for pushing, after Francis fouled Musselwhite.

=== Post-match ===
Port Vale manager John Rudge said that: "In the last 20 minutes I was sitting on the edge of my seat because our legs seemed to go. I thought we were in control until then but when they scored they put us under a lot of pressure and we had to hang on." The team stayed overnight in Watford and then returned to have an open top bus for a tour of the north of Stoke-on-Trent, which was attended by thousands of supporters. Joan Walley, MP for Stoke-on-Trent North, tabled a motion in Parliament to congratulate Port Vale on their win and applaud Stockport County for their efforts. Swan and Slaven both claimed to have been named man of the match in their respective autobiographies, with Slaven specifically recalling that Sky TV's match summariser Lennie Lawrence had selected him for the honour; ironically the players would also come to blows during a training session later in 1993.

Port Vale were estimated to have made more than £200,000 from the cup run. The following week Vale were defeated 3–0 at Wembley and so both clubs remained in the Second Division, though 1993–94 saw Vale promoted as runners-up. Stockport finished fourth in the league, up from their sixth-place finish in 1992–93, they beat York City by the odd goal in the play-off semi-finals, but tasted defeat at Wembley once again as Burnley won the final 2–1. County finally joined Vale in the First Division with automatic promotion in the 1996–97 season. In 2001 Vale lifted the Football League Trophy for a second time.

For John Rudge it was to be his first and last cup trophy in his 16 years in charge at Vale, though he continued to bring the club success in the league, taking them to eighth in the second tier in 1996–97, their highest post-war position. Rudge was dismissed in controversial fashion in January 1999. Danny Bergara stepped down as County manager after one more season at the helm; he held a number of management positions before his death in July 2007. Vale's Paul Kerr and Bernie Slaven were nearing the end of their careers. Kerr had brief spells with Leicester City and Wycombe Wanderers and Slaven joined Darlington before both men left the professional game in 1995. Stockport's slightly more youthful Kevin Francis enjoyed a longer career in the game, leaving the club in January 1995 he spent time with numerous clubs as well as earning two caps for Saint Kitts and Nevis in 1998. County's Jim Gannon would find great success as Stockport manager, before taking the reins at Port Vale in 2011 for a controversial stint as manager which ended in his sacking after just 74 days, the shortest appointment in the club's history.

== Match details ==
22 May 1993
15:00 BST

Port Vale	2–1	Stockport County
Kerr 4'; Slaven 37'	Report	Francis 66'

Wembley Stadium, London
Attendance: 35,885
Referee: David Elleray (Harrow)

Port Vale	Stockport County

GK	1	Paul Musselwhite
DF	2	Neil Aspin
MF	3	Kevin Kent
MF	4	Andy Porter
DF	5	Peter Swan	Yellow card
DF	6	Dean Glover
FW	7	Bernie Slaven
MF	8	Robin van der Laan		(substituted off) 89'
FW	9	Martin Foyle
MF	10	Paul Kerr	Yellow card
MF	11	Ian Taylor
Substitutes:
DF	14	Peter Billing		(substituted on) 89'
FW		Nicky Cross
Manager:
John Rudge

GK	Neil Edwards
DF	Lee Todd
DF	Mick Wallace
DF	Alan Finley
DF	Dave Miller
MF	Bill Williams
MF	Jim Gannon
MF	Peter Ward
MF	Chris Beaumont	(substituted off) 56'
FW	Kevin Francis
FW	Peter Duffield
Substitutes:
FW	Andy Preece	(substituted on) 56'
MF	David Frain
Manager:
Danny Bergara

MATCH RULES

- 90 minutes.
- 30 minutes of extra-time if necessary.
- Penalty shoot-out if scores still level.
- Maximum of 3 substitutions.
