= Neil Aspin =

English footballer & manager (born 1965)

Personal information
- Full name: Neil Aspin
- Date of birth: 12 April 1965 (age 61)
- Place of birth: Gateshead, England
- Height: 6 ft 0 in (1.83 m)
- Position: Defender

Youth career
- 1979–1982: Leeds United

Senior career*
Years	Team	Apps	(Gls)
1982–1989	Leeds United	207	(5)
1989–1999	Port Vale	348	(3)
1999–2001	Darlington	50	(0)
2001	Hartlepool United	10	(0)
2001–2004	Harrogate Town		
2009–2014	FC Halifax Town	0	(0)
Total		615	(8)

Managerial career
- 2005–2009: Harrogate Town
- 2009–2015: FC Halifax Town
- 2015–2017: Gateshead
- 2017–2019: Port Vale
- * Club domestic league appearances and goals

Neil Aspin (born 12 April 1965) is an English football manager and former player.

A defender who could play at centre-back and right-back, he was a marker and an tackler. He made his debut in the English Football League for Leeds United at the age of 16 in February 1982, which would be his only appearance in the First Division (first tier). He spent seven seasons in the Second Division (second tier) with the club, making 244 league and cup appearances and being named the club's Player of the Year for the 1984–85 season. He was sold to Port Vale for a £150,000 fee in July 1989 and would go on to make 410 appearances in all competitions during a ten-season stay at Vale Park. He was named the club's Player of the Year in the 1989–90 season and helped the "Valiants" to win the Football League Trophy in 1993. The following season, 1993–94, he was named on the PFA Team of the Year as he helped Vale to win promotion out of the Second Division (third tier), and he again won the Port Vale Player of the Year award. He also played in the 1996 Anglo-Italian Cup final defeat to Genoa. He spent July 1999 to January 2001 with Third Division (fourth tier) side Darlington. Then he spent the second half of the 2000–01 season at Hartlepool United. He played in play-off final defeats with Leeds, Port Vale and Darlington.

He played non-League football at Harrogate Town until retiring as a player in 2004, and then managed the club from January 2005 to April 2009. He was appointed as manager of FC Halifax Town in April 2009. He managed Halifax to three successive promotions in his first four seasons at the club, taking them from the second tier of the Northern Premier League to the Conference Premier by winning the Northern Premier League Division One North and Premier Division titles in 2009–10 and 2010–11 and then the Conference North play-offs in 2013; he also won the Peter Swales Shield in 2011 and the West Riding County Cup in 2013, as well as numerous Manager of the Month awards. However, he was sacked in September 2015 after a series of poor results, and two months later took charge at Gateshead. He spent two years at Gateshead before he was installed as Port Vale manager in October 2017. He steered the club away from relegation at the end of the 2017–18 season before tendering his resignation in January 2019.

== Playing career ==
=== Leeds United ===
Born in Gateshead, County Durham, Aspin began his career as a trainee at Leeds United, a club he supported as a boy despite its distance from his hometown. He signed with the club as a schoolboy at the age of 14 and became an apprentice at age 16. He attended Heathfield Senior High School and won Durham County Schools honours and had trials for England Schoolboys. He became the second youngest ever débutante for the club, behind Peter Lorimer, when he played in a 2–0 defeat to Ipswich Town at Elland Road on 20 February 1982 at the age of 16 years, 10 months and 9 days; he was selected by manager Allan Clarke due to suspension to Kenny Burns and injuries to Trevor Cherry, Brian Greenhoff and Neil Firm. He was the subject of a documentary in the Rowan's Report series, aired on ITV on 9 August 1982, a series which focused on some of the country's most successful children. He signed professionally at the age of 17.

Leeds were relegated out of the First Division at the end of the 1981–82 season. Aspin made his second appearance for the "Whites" on 4 December 1982, in a 1–0 home defeat by Queens Park Rangers, his first start under new manager Eddie Gray. He went on to make a further 14 Second Division appearances during the 1982–83 season, with the club posting an eighth-place finish in their first season back in the second tier for 19 years. Aspin scored his first senior goal on 17 March 1984, helping to secure a 2–1 home win over Grimsby Town. He featured 26 times throughout the 1983–84 season and 33 times in the 1984–85 campaign, scoring his second goal career at Carlisle United; he was voted the club's Player of the Year in 1985. He posted 42 appearances in the 1985–86 campaign, scoring in away wins at Stoke City and Bradford City, though Leeds slipped down to 14th in the table as new manager Billy Bremner started to rebuild the team.

United came close to promotion in the 1986–87 season, with Aspin missing only one league game to make a total of 54 league and cup appearances and scoring goals against Oldham Athletic and Shrewsbury Town; Leeds secured a play-off place with a fourth-place finish, but lost 2–1 to Charlton Athletic in the play-off final replay at St Andrew's. John Sheridan had put Leeds ahead in extra time, only for Peter Shirtliff to score in the 113th and 117th minutes to deny United a return to the top tier. This followed disappointment in the FA Cup, where Leeds had reached the semi-finals, only to suffer defeat to Coventry City at Hillsborough, again in extra time. Aspin played in the game after he postponed his wedding, which had been scheduled to take place on the day of the semi-final. He featured 30 times during the 1987–88 season and 39 times in the 1988–89 campaign, before he was allowed to leave the club by new manager Howard Wilkinson after losing his place to new signing Mel Sterland. He was sold to Port Vale for a £150,000 fee in July 1989, choosing the Midlands club ahead of a move to London-based Charlton Athletic. Vale had offered £75,000 a year earlier, which had been rejected by Leeds.

=== Port Vale ===
Port Vale were preparing for their first Second Division campaign in 32 years when Aspin arrived at the club. He played 51 games in the 1989–90 season, as the club recorded an eleventh-place finish. He immediately established himself as a firm favourite with the supporters at Vale Park, taking the club's player of the year award and most of the other club's awards at the end of the campaign. He was also entrusted with the club's captaincy. He played 46 games in the 1990–91 season, and scored his first goal for the "Valiants" in a 3–2 win over Portsmouth on 19 January. He was consistent again in the relegation season of 1991–92, making another 46 appearances. On 24 November 1992, he was hospitalised in a 3–1 win over Potteries derby rivals Stoke City following a knee-high challenge from Steve Foley, though Aspin later said "it was a fantastic night, a great atmosphere and I still remember the ball sticking in the mud". He played 48 games in the 1992–93 season and played a leading role in the club's victorious Football League Trophy campaign. The final was played at Wembley Stadium, and Aspin played alongside Peter Swan and Dean Glover to help Vale record a 2–1 win over Stockport County. Vale finished third in the league, just one point second-placed Bolton Wanderers, and reached Wembley again after beating Stockport County in the play-off semi-finals. However, they suffered a 3–0 defeat to West Bromwich Albion in the play-off final.

Vale secured promotion into the First Division at the end of the 1993–94 season. Aspin was voted Player of the Year for a second time for his performances across 51 appearances that season. He was also elected to the divisional Team of the Season, as voted for by members of the Professional Footballers' Association. He scored just the eighth goal of his career on 12 March 1994, in a 4–1 win at Hartlepool United. Vale retained their second-tier status in 1994–95, with Aspin featuring in 40 games. He was reduced to 30 appearances in the 1995–96 campaign, though did play in the 1996 Anglo-Italian Cup final, as Vale lost 5–2 to Serie B side Genoa. He scored the third and final goal of his Vale career on 16 April 1996, in a 1–0 home win over Grimsby Town.

He made 38 appearances in the 1996–97 campaign, as the club posted their highest ever post-war finish, eighth in the second tier. He played 29 games in the 1997–98 and 32 games in 1998–99 seasons. He was then handed a free transfer by new manager Brian Horton, who had replaced long-serving John Rudge in January 1999. Aspin had made 410 league and cup appearances in his ten years at the club and enjoyed a testimonial match featuring Vale supporting pop-star Robbie Williams.

=== Later career ===
Aspin remained in the English Football League after leaving Port Vale, signing with Darlington in July 1999. He made 34 appearances, helping David Hodgson's "Quakers" to reach the Third Division play-off final in 2000 after overcoming Hartlepool United in the play-off semi-finals following their fourth-place finish at the end of the 1999–2000 season. However, Peterborough United won the play-off final 1–0, leaving Aspin with three defeats from his three play-off final appearances. Darlington struggled in the 2000–01 season, and Aspin left the club in January 2001 to sign for Hartlepool United. He played ten league games as the "Pools" reached the Third Division play-offs, where they were defeated by Blackpool at the semi-final stage. At the end of the campaign Aspin joined Northern Premier League First Division side Harrogate Town as a player-coach.

Harrogate topped the table by a ten-point margin in the 2001–02 season and spent the 2002–03 campaign in the Premier Division. The club was invited to join the newly formed Conference North after a fifth-place finish in the 2003–04 season. Aspin worked as manager John Reed's assistant as he wound down his playing career to focus on coaching. He was expected to return to Darlington as a defensive coach, only for the move to fall through after the club reversed its decision.

== Style of play ==
A solid defender who could play at centre-back and right-back, Aspin was a good marker and an adept tackler. He was popular with supporters due to his commitment and hard-working style of play, which made up for his lack of technical skill. He was nicknamed "Skull" by Leeds fans, having suffered from hair loss at an early age. In May 2019, he was voted into the "Ultimate Port Vale XI" by members of the OneValeFan supporter website. In December 2025, supporters voted him onto the all-time Port Vale XI on the club's official website.

"Aspo was one of those guys who played with a very basic philosophy. Either the ball or the player could pass him, but never both – and he often preferred to clear the player rather than the ball."

— Robbie Earle writing in 2012.

== Managerial career ==
=== Harrogate Town ===
Aspin returned to former club Harrogate Town in his first management role on 18 January 2005. He secured a 5–1 win over Ashton United on 12 February, and Town ended the 2004–05 season in sixth place, just one point outside the Conference North play-offs. They secured a play-off place in his first full season, 2005–06, but lost out 1–0 to Stafford Rangers in the semi-finals. Harrogate also played their first match against Football League opposition, taking Torquay United to a replay in the first round of the FA Cup. They again finished in sixth-place in the 2006–07 and 2007–08 seasons, missing out by one and then two points respectively. Following a ninth-place finish at the end of the 2008–09 campaign, Aspin decided he could not take the club any further with the budget on offer and announced his decision to leave.

=== FC Halifax Town ===
On 28 April 2009, Aspin was appointed manager of Northern Premier League Division One North club FC Halifax Town. In his first season with the "Shaymen", 2009–10, he led them to the Division One North title, winning the league with 100 points, with the team scoring 108 goals. He was named as Manager of the Month for September after his team secured six wins in seven games. He managed Halifax to back-to-back promotions as they secured the Northern Premier League Premier Division title with 98 points in the 2010–11 campaign, again scoring 108 goals. In his first two seasons, the team had only lost six league games, allowing Aspin to pick up several Manager of the Month awards, as well as the Non-League Paper Manager of the Year award. In August 2011 he sold Jamie Vardy to Fleetwood Town for an initial fee of £150,000, which later rose to around £500,000. He had signed Vardy from Stocksbridge Park Steels for £16,000 just over 12 months previously.

After defeating Ashton United on penalties in the Peter Swales Shield, Aspin led his team to the FA Cup first round for the first time in the club's brief history, where they lost at home to Charlton Athletic. He was named as Manager of the Month for October 2011 after winning five of their six games. However, a third consecutive promotion eluded him in the 2011–12 season; Halifax secured a play-off place with a third-place finish, but were beaten 3–2 on aggregate by Gainsborough Trinity at the semi-final stage. Aspin went on to say "we deserved to win the game today there is no question about that. We had more possession, more shots on goal, more corners, hit the woodwork twice and we dominated play. However, if you don't score in football, unfortunately you don't win matches and it wasn't to be. You need some luck to win the play-offs and we didn't get it." Aspin picked up another Manager of the Month award after Halifax scored 14 goals in their two league and two FA Cup matches in November 2012. Halifax secured a play-off spot at the end of the 2012–13 season, and won a third-successive promotion with a 1–0 victory over Brackley Town. He also added the West Riding County Cup to the club's trophy cabinet with a 1–0 victory over Guiseley.

In the club's first season in the Conference Premier, he led Halifax to a fifth-place finish, securing a play-off spot. They lost out to Cambridge United at the play-off semi-final stage, squandering a 1–0 first-leg lead after Lee Gregory had scored from the penalty spot. Halifax had a great start to the 2014–15 season and Aspin was named as the division's manager of the month after leading the club to five wins in six games in August. During that same month he signed a new two-year contract with the club. On 1 October, now aged 49, he played himself as a 69th-minute substitute for Lee Nogan in a 3–0 defeat at Guiseley in the first round of the West Riding County Cup. He was again named as Manager of the Month for February after Halifax rose to fourth-place with 14 points from an available 18, including four away victories. Halifax's promotion push collapsed at the end of the season, and they ended in ninth place on a run of just one win in their final 15 games. He was sacked on 17 September 2015 following what the board described as "a prolonged period of indifferent results stretching back to February 2015".

=== Gateshead ===
On 27 November 2015, it was announced that Aspin was to be appointed manager of National League club Gateshead on 30 November after signing an 18-month contract. He stated it was "lovely to come back" to his hometown club. He led the "Tynesiders" to a ninth-place finish in 2015–16. He signed an extended two-year contract in August 2016. He was named National League Manager of the Month for February 2017 after leading Gateshead to within touching distance of the play-offs with a series of victories. Gateshead ended the 2016–17 campaign in eighth place, 12 points outside the play-offs. At his departure, Gateshead were 15th in the National League table.

=== Port Vale ===
On 4 October 2017, Aspin was appointed as manager of former club Port Vale, who were 22nd in League Two after a poor start to the 2017–18 season; his former manager John Rudge also returned to the club in an advisory role. Aspin said that his new squad was too big with 33 senior professionals at the club, and added that he would try to find a formation to suit the players at his disposal and that he wanted the team to push further forward to support target-man striker Tom Pope. He picked up his first win as Vale manager on 14 October, with Pope scoring a brace in a 3–1 home win over Cheltenham Town. Seven days later, Aspin was named as manager of the week after his side won 1–0 away at Exeter City. He went on to be nominated for the League Two Manager of the Month award after three wins in five games and five goals in the month of October. He signed a new two-and-a-half-year contract with the club in December 2017. He was also nominated for that month's Manager of the Month award after collecting 13 points from Vale's five matches, including a 4–0 victory over league leaders Luton Town and a 1–0 win over promotion chasing Coventry City; However, the award instead went to Danny Cowley at Lincoln City.

In the January transfer window Aspin allowed two departures, plus Gavin Gunning left the club after rejecting a contract offer and centre-back Tom Anderson was recalled from his loan; incoming were non-League players Dior Angus, Luke Hannant and Callum Howe, as well as loanees Donovan Wilson, Zak Jules, Charlie Raglan and Kyle Howkins. Aspin remarked that the four centre-backs brought in did not cost the club much financially, and that he would have liked to have strengthened in other areas "but for one reason or another it just hasn't happened". However, he managed to convert Cristian Montaño from a winger to a left-back and Antony Kay from a centre-half to a central midfielder, and guided the club to safety with two games to spare. Vale ended the campaign in 20th-place – the joint-lowest finish in the club's history – with just one point above the relegation zone, having been out of the relegation zone on goal difference upon Aspin's arrival at the club.

Building for the 2018–19 season, Aspin released ten players and transfer-listed a further four whilst bringing in ten new signings and five loan players. Incoming were mostly free transfer signings and included promoted Wycombe Wanderers goalkeeper Scott Brown, Cambridge United captain centre-half Leon Legge, 30-year-old Carlisle United central midfielder Luke Joyce and troubled but talented Peterborough United striker Ricky Miller (signed for an undisclosed fee); also arriving were Alfreton Town winger Brendon Daniels, Aldershot Town Player of the Year Manny Oyeleke, The New Saints centre-back Connell Rawlinson, Gateshead defender Theo Vassell, Stevenage midfielder Tom Conlon, and former AFC Bournemouth loanee Ben Whitfield, whilst former fan's favourite Louis Dodds, teenage striker Idris Kanu, forward Scott Quigley, full-back Mitch Clark and midfielder Lewis Hardcastle also joined on season-long loan deals. The team had an indifferent start to the season, with the highlight being a 1–0 victory at local rivals Crewe Alexandra on 22 September. Having seen their team pick up just seven points from an available 27 in November and December, a section of travelling supporters booed and heckled Aspin during a 1–1 draw at Lincoln City on New Year's Day; Aspin reacted badly to the fan's "lack of respect" towards him and considered quitting his role, but said that he decided to stay because he had the support of the players and chairman Norman Smurthwaite. However, he tendered his resignation on 30 January, stating that "I am very proud of the job we did in keeping the club in League Two and we leave the club in a better place on and off the pitch. I fully accept results from December have been poor and expected to be higher up the table and know the players are capable of doing that." He later did corporate work for Leeds United.

== Managerial style ==
Aspin has stated that he wants his players to be "honest" by not feigning injury or otherwise attempting to cheat and that he tries to be respectful towards officials. He also has a reputation for honesty in dealing with the media, giving fair assessments of his team's performances. He does not allow his players to wear gloves during first-team matches. He tends to prefer to play defensive football.

== Personal life ==
He married Dianne and had a son, Alex, and daughter, Chloe.

== Career statistics ==
=== Playing statistics ===
Appearances and goals by club, season and competition
Club	Season	League			FA Cup		Other		Total	
Club	Season	Division	Apps	Goals	Apps	Goals	Apps	Goals	Apps	Goals
Leeds United	1981–82	First Division	1	0	0	0	0	0	1	0
Leeds United	1982–83	Second Division	15	0	4	0	0	0	19	0
Leeds United	1983–84	Second Division	21	1	3	0	2	0	26	1
Leeds United	1984–85	Second Division	32	1	1	0	0	0	33	1
Leeds United	1985–86	Second Division	38	2	1	0	3	0	42	2
Leeds United	1986–87	Second Division	41	1	5	0	8	1	54	2
Leeds United	1987–88	Second Division	26	0	1	0	3	0	30	0
Leeds United	1988–89	Second Division	33	0	2	0	4	0	39	0
Leeds United	Total		207	5	17	0	20	1	244	6
Port Vale	1989–90	Second Division	42	0	3	0	6	0	51	0
Port Vale	1990–91	Second Division	41	1	2	0	3	0	46	1
Port Vale	1991–92	Second Division	42	0	1	0	4	0	47	0
Port Vale	1992–93	Second Division	35	0	3	0	8	0	46	0
Port Vale	1993–94	Second Division	40	1	5	0	6	0	51	1
Port Vale	1994–95	First Division	37	0	2	0	1	0	40	0
Port Vale	1995–96	First Division	22	1	4	0	4	0	30	1
Port Vale	1996–97	First Division	33	0	1	0	4	0	38	0
Port Vale	1997–98	First Division	26	0	2	0	2	0	30	0
Port Vale	1998–99	First Division	30	0	1	0	1	0	32	0
Port Vale	Total		348	3	24	0	39	0	411	3
Darlington	1999–2000	Third Division	29	0	2	0	3	0	34	0
Darlington	2000–01	Third Division	21	0	3	0	2	0	26	0
Darlington	Total		50	0	5	0	5	0	60	0
Hartlepool United	2000–01	Third Division	10	0	0	0	1	0	11	0
FC Halifax Town	2014–15	Conference Premier	0	0	0	0	1	0	1	0
Career total			615	8	46	0	66	1	727	9

=== Managerial statistics ===
As of match played 29 January 2019

Managerial record by team and tenure
Team	From	To	Record					Ref
Team	From	To	P	W	D	L	Win %	Ref
Harrogate Town	18 January 2005	26 April 2009	202	89	48	65	44.1	
FC Halifax Town	28 April 2009	17 September 2015	332	178	78	76	53.6	
Gateshead	27 November 2015	4 October 2017	94	37	28	29	39.4	
Port Vale	4 October 2017	30 January 2019	78	24	23	31	30.8	
Total			706	328	177	201	46.5	

== Honours ==
=== As a player ===
Port Vale

- Football League Trophy: 1992–93
- Football League Second Division second-place promotion: 1993–94
- Anglo-Italian Cup runner-up: 1995–96

Harrogate Town

- Northern Premier League First Division: 2001–02

Individual

- Leeds United Player of the Year: 1984–85
- Port Vale Player of the Year: 1989–90, 1993–94
- PFA Team of the Year: 1993–94 Second Division
- Port Vale Hall of Fame: inducted 2026 (inaugural)

=== As a manager ===
FC Halifax Town

- Conference North play-offs: 2013
- Northern Premier League Premier Division: 2010–11
- Northern Premier League Division One North: 2009–10
- Peter Swales Shield: 2011
- West Riding County Cup: 2013

Individual

- Northern Premier League Premier Division Manager of the Month: September 2010
- Conference North Manager of the Month: October 2011, November 2012, February 2015
- Conference Premier / National League Manager of the Month: August 2014, February 2017
