= 1994 Football League Second Division play-off final =

Association football match

- The final took place at Wembley Stadium.
- Event: 1993–94 Football League Second Division
Burnley	Stockport County
2	1
- Date: 29 May 1994
- Venue: Wembley Stadium, London
- Referee: David Elleray
- Attendance: 44,806

The 1994 Football League Second Division play-off final was an association football match which was played on 29 May 1994 at Wembley Stadium, London, between Burnley and Stockport County. It was to determine the third and final team to gain promotion from the Football League Second Division, the third tier of English football, to the First Division. The top two teams of the 1993–94 Football League Second Division, Reading and Port Vale, gained automatic promotion, while the teams placed from third to sixth place took part in play-off semi-finals; the winners of these competed for the final place in the First Division for the 1994–95 season. Burnley and Stockport County beat Plymouth Argyle and York City, respectively, in the semi-finals.

The referee for the match, which was played in front of 44,806 spectators, was David Elleray. Chris Beaumont opened the scoring for Stockport in less than two minutes, when he headed David Frain's free kick into the Burnley goal. In the 14th minute, Ted McMinn won the ball from Stockport's Mick Wallace who reacted: first he fouled McMinn and then spat at him, earning himself a straight red card from Elleray. In the 29th minute, David Eyres beat three Stockport defenders before striking the ball past John Keeley to score his 28th goal of the season, and levelling the score at 1–1. In the 60th minute, Beaumont stamped on Les Thompson's calf and was shown a straight red card. Midway through the second half, Gary Parkinson took possession of a loose ball and struck a low shot from the edge of the Stockport penalty area past Keeley, making it 2–1 to Burnley who gained promotion to the First Division.

Burnley ended their next season in 22nd place in the First Division, two places and eight points below safety, and were relegated back to the Second Division. Stockport's following season saw them finish in eleventh position in the Second Division.

== Route to the final ==
Football League Second Division final table, leading positions
Pos	Team	Pld	W	D	L	GF	GA	GD	Pts
1	Reading	46	26	11	9	81	44	+37	89
2	Port Vale	46	26	10	10	79	46	+33	88
3	Plymouth Argyle	46	25	10	11	88	56	+32	85
4	Stockport County	46	24	13	9	74	44	+30	85
5	York City	46	21	12	13	64	40	+24	75
6	Burnley	46	21	10	15	79	58	+21	73

Stockport County finished the regular 1993–94 season in fourth position in the Football League Second Division, the third tier of the English football league system, two places and twelve points ahead of Burnley. Both therefore missed out on the two automatic places for promotion to the First Division and instead took part in the play-offs, along with Plymouth Argyle and York City, to determine the third promoted team. Stockport County finished three points behind Port Vale (who were promoted in second place) and four points behind league winners Reading.

Burnley's opponents for their play-off semi-final were Plymouth Argyle with the first match of the two-legged tie taking place at Turf Moor in Burnley on 15 May 1994. Martin Thorpe, writing in The Guardian described it as a "rough, tough affair" in which six players were shown the yellow card, and although Plymouth had more chances to score, the match ended goalless. The second leg took place three days later at Home Park in Plymouth. The home side took the lead a quarter of an hour into the match through Dwight Marshall: Burnley failed to clear a free-kick from Paul Dalton and the ball fell to Marshall who struck it past Marlon Beresford, the Burnley goalkeeper. John Francis then levelled the score in the 29th minute, beating the goalkeeper after a "marvellous run". Two minutes later he doubled his and Burnley's tally, scoring after receiving a pass from Adrian Heath. Warren Joyce scored with nine minutes remaining to make the final score 3–1 and Burnley progressed to the final with an aggregate victory of the same scoreline.

Stockport faced York City in their semi-final and the first leg was held at Bootham Crescent in York on 15 May 1994. The home side missed several chances to take the lead while Mike Flynn's header for Stockport was cleared off the York goal-line, and the match ended 0–0. The second leg was played three days later at Edgeley Park in Stockport. After a goalless first half, Chris Beaumont received a pass from Jim Gannon before taking the ball round Dean Kiely, the York goalkeeper, to score in the 85th minute. With no further goals, the match ended 1–0 and Stockport went through to the final with the same aggregate score.

== Match ==
=== Background ===
This was Stockport County's fourth appearance in the play-offs, having failed to make it past the semi-finals in 1990 and 1993 and losing in the 1992 Football League Third Division play-off final 2–1 against Peterborough United. They had played in the third tier of English football since gaining automatic promotion from the Fourth Division as runners-up in the 1990–91 season and had not participated in the second tier since the 1937–38 season. Burnley had taken part in the play-offs on one previous occasion, losing in the semi-finals in 1991. They had played in the third tier since being automatically promoted as champions of the Fourth Division in the 1991–92 season and had most recently featured in the second tier in the 1982–83 season. In the two league matches between the sides in the regular season, Stockport won their home match 2–1 at Edgeley Park in September 1993 while the game at Turf Moor the following March ended in a 1–1 draw. This was Stockport's fourth visit to Wembley Stadium in two years, including the 1992 play-off final and the final of the Football League Trophy in 1992 and 1993, both of which ended in defeat.

The referee for the match was David Elleray. Burnley played as a 4–5–1 formation while Stockport adopted a 4–4–2.

=== Summary ===
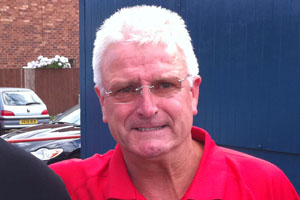
Burnley manager Jimmy Mullen (pictured in 2010) described the final as "the greatest day of my career".

The match kicked off around 3 p.m. on 29 May 1994 at Wembley Stadium in front of 44,806 spectators. Beaumont opened the scoring in less than two minutes, when he headed David Frain's free kick into the Burnley goal. Ten minutes later, Francis challenged John Keeley just outside the Burnley penalty area: Francis injured his knee ligaments, was shown a yellow card and had to be substituted for Andy Farrell. In the 14th minute, Ted McMinn won the ball from Stockport's Mick Wallace who reacted: first he fouled McMinn and then spat at him, earning himself a straight red card from Elleray. McMinn was also booked for retaliation. In the 29th minute, David Eyres beat three Stockport defenders before striking the ball past Keeley to score his 28th goal of the season, and levelling the score at 1–1. Eyres also hit the frame of the Stockport goal twice as well as seeing another chance defended.

Neither side made any changes to their personnel at half time. In the 60th minute, Beaumont stamped on Les Thompson's calf and was shown a straight red card. Midway through the second half, Gary Parkinson took possession of a loose ball and struck a low shot from the edge of the Stockport penalty area past Keeley, making it 2–1 to Burnley. Despite being down to nine players, Stockport still had chances to score, Lee Todd shooting over the bar from around 8 yards (7.3 m) and Gannon missing the target from even closer. No further goals were scored and the match ended 2–1 with Burnley gaining promotion to the First Division.

=== Details ===
29 May 1994	Burnley	2–1	Stockport County	Wembley Stadium, London
15:00 UTC	Eyres 29'; Parkinson 66'	Report	Beaumont 2'	Attendance: 44,806; Referee: David Elleray

1	Marlon Beresford
2	Gary Parkinson
3	Les Thompson
4	Steve Davis
5	John Pender
6	Warren Joyce
7	Ted McMinn (yellow card)
8	John Deary
9	Adrian Heath
10	John Francis (yellow card) (substituted off) 12'
11	David Eyres
Substitutes:
12	Andy Farrell (substituted in) 12'
Manager:
Jimmy Mullen

1	John Keeley
2	Lee Todd (yellow card)
3	Mick Wallace (red card) 14'
4	Sean Connelly
5	Mike Flynn (yellow card)
6	Bill Williams (substituted off) 59'
7	Jim Gannon (yellow card) (substituted off) 81'
8	Peter Ward (yellow card)
9	Kevin Francis
10	Chris Beaumont (red card) 60'
11	David Frain
Substitutes:
12	Dave Miller (substituted in) 81'
13	Andy Preece (yellow card) (substituted in) 59'
Manager:
Danny Bergara

== Post-match ==
Jimmy Mullen, the winning manager, said that it was "the greatest day of my career" and reflected on two promotions in the last three seasons, describing Burnley's success as "remarkable". The Stockport manager Danny Bergara said that he did not understand what had happened to his side: "It was bizarre ... I don't know what came over one or two of our players because we are not the kind of team to go berserk. But on one or two occasions we did."

Burnley ended their next season in 22nd place in the First Division, two places and eight points below safety, and were relegated back to the Second Division. Stockport's following season saw them finish in eleventh position in the Second Division.
