= 1981–82 Leeds United A.F.C. season =

1981–82 season of Leeds United

Leeds United
1981–82 season
- Chairman: Manny Cussins
- Manager: Allan Clarke
- Stadium: Elland Road
- First Division: 20th (relegated)
- FA Cup: Fourth round
- League Cup: Second round
- Top goalscorer: League: Arthur Graham; Frank Worthington (9 each); All: Arthur Graham; Frank Worthington (9 each)
- Highest home attendance: 33,689 vs Liverpool (6 February 1982, First Division)
- Lowest home attendance: 16,385 vs Coventry City (16 April 1990, First Division)
- Average home league attendance: 21,889

The 1981–82 season was Leeds United's eighteenth consecutive season in the Football League First Division, where they were relegated.

== Season summary ==
For the first half of the campaign, this season appeared to be a carbon-copy of the previous one, with a terrible start followed by an improved run of form that lifted Leeds into mid-table by Christmas. This time, however, Leeds completely imploded after the turn of the year, plunging them right back into relegation trouble. A 2-1 victory over Brighton on the final Saturday meant that Leeds needed to win at fellow strugglers West Bromwich Albion three days later to stay up and relegate the West Midlands team, but the match ended 2-0 to the home team. While chairman Manny Cussins initially promised that Clarke would be allowed the opportunity to take Leeds straight back up, he later changed his mind and sacked him, instead appointing Eddie Gray as player-manager.

== League table ==
Pos	Team	Pld	W	D	L	GF	GA	GD	Pts	Qualification or relegation
18	Stoke City	42	12	8	22	44	63	−19	44	
19	Sunderland	42	11	11	20	38	58	−20	44	
20	Leeds United (R)	42	10	12	20	39	61	−22	42	Relegation to the Second Division
21	Wolverhampton Wanderers (R)	42	10	10	22	32	63	−31	40	Relegation to the Second Division
22	Middlesbrough (R)	42	8	15	19	34	52	−18	39	Relegation to the Second Division

Source: World Football
Rules for classification: 1) Points; 2) Goal difference; 3) Goals scored
(R) Relegated

== First-team squad ==
Squad at end of season

Note: Flags indicate national team as defined under FIFA eligibility rules; some limited exceptions apply. Players may hold more than one non-FIFA nationality.

Pos.	Nation	Player
GK	ENG	John Lukic
DF	ENG	Neil Aspin
DF	ENG	Trevor Cherry
DF	ENG	Neil Firm
DF	ENG	Brian Greenhoff
DF	ENG	Paul Hart
DF	SCO	Kenny Burns
DF	SCO	Frank Gray
MF	ENG	Tony Arins
MF	ENG	Peter Barnes
MF	ENG	Gary Hamson
MF	ENG	Kevin Hird

Pos.	Nation	Player
MF	WAL	Carl Harris
MF	WAL	Brian Flynn
MF	WAL	Gwyn Thomas
MF	SCO	Arthur Graham
MF	SCO	Eddie Gray
MF	SCO	Tommy Wright
FW	ENG	Aiden Butterworth
FW	ENG	Frank Worthington
FW	ENG	Terry Connor
FW	WAL	Steve Balcombe
FW	SCO	Derek Parlane

=== Left club during season ===
Note: Flags indicate national team as defined under FIFA eligibility rules; some limited exceptions apply. Players may hold more than one non-FIFA nationality.

Pos.	Nation	Player
DF	WAL	Byron Stevenson (to Birmingham City)

== Reserve squad ==
Note: Flags indicate national team as defined under FIFA eligibility rules; some limited exceptions apply. Players may hold more than one non-FIFA nationality.

Pos.	Nation	Player
GK	ENG	David Seaman

== Transfers ==
=== In ===
- Frank Gray - Nottingham Forest, 31 May, £300,000
- Peter Barnes - West Bromwich Albion, 1 August, £930,000
- Kenny Burns - Nottingham Forest, 14 October, £400,000
- John Sheridan - Manchester City, 2 March
- Frank Worthington - Birmingham City, 8 March, swap

=== Out ===
- Neil Parker - Scarborough, 1 July, free
- Jeff Chandler - Bolton Wanderers, 1 October, £40,000
- Tony Arins - Scunthorpe United, 1 November, free
- Keith Parkinson - Doncaster Rovers, 1 January, free
- Alejandro Sabella - Estudiantes, 1 January, £120,000
- Byron Stevenson - Birmingham City, 1 March, swap

Transfers in: ▼£1,630,000
Transfers out: ▲£160,000
Total spending: ▼£1,470,000

=== Loaned out ===
- Keith Parkinson - Hull City, 1 November
- Neil Firm - Oldham Athletic, 1 March
- Brian Flynn - Burnley, 4 March

== Competitions ==
=== Football League First Division ===
==== League table ====
Pos	Team	Pld	W	D	L	GF	GA	GD	Pts	Qualification or relegation
18	Stoke City	42	12	8	22	44	63	−19	44	
19	Sunderland	42	11	11	20	38	58	−20	44	
20	Leeds United (R)	42	10	12	20	39	61	−22	42	Relegation to the Second Division
21	Wolverhampton Wanderers (R)	42	10	10	22	32	63	−31	40	Relegation to the Second Division
22	Middlesbrough (R)	42	8	15	19	34	52	−18	39	Relegation to the Second Division

Source: World Football
Rules for classification: 1) Points; 2) Goal difference; 3) Goals scored
(R) Relegated

==== Matches ====
Win	Draw	Loss

First Division match results
Date	Opponent	Venue	Result F–A	Scorers	Attendance
29 August 1981	Swansea City	A	1–5	Parlane	23,489
2 September 1981	Everton	H	1–1	Graham	26,502
5 September 1981	Wolverhampton Wanderers	H	3–0	Graham 3	20,216
12 September 1981	Coventry City	A	0–4		13,065
19 September 1981	Arsenal	H	0–0		21,410
23 September 1981	Manchester City	A	0–4		35,077
26 September 1981	Ipswich Town	A	1–2	Barnes	22,319
30 September 1981	Manchester United	A	0–1		47,019
3 October 1981	Aston Villa	H	1–1	Balcombe	21,065
10 October 1981	Liverpool	A	0–3		35,840
17 October 1981	West Bromwich Albion	H	3–1	Graham, Cherry, Connor	19,164
24 October 1981	Sunderland	H	1–0	E. Gray	25,220
31 October 1981	Nottingham Forest	A	1–2	Butterworth	25,272
7 November 1981	Notts County	H	1–0	Butterworth	19,552
21 November 1981	Southampton	A	0–4		21,127
28 November 1981	West Ham United	H	3–3	Graham, Hird (pen), Cherry	25,637
5 December 1981	Stoke City	A	2–1	Graham, Hamson	13,901
12 December 1981	Tottenham Hotspur	H	0–0		28,780
16 January 1982	Swansea City	H	2–0	Stevenson, Butterworth	18,709
30 January 1982	Arsenal	A	0–1		22,408
6 February 1982	Coventry City	H	0–0		16,385
20 February 1982	Ipswich Town	H	0–2		20,287
27 February 1982	Liverpool	H	0–2		33,689
2 March 1982	Brighton & Hove Albion	A	0–1		12,857
10 March 1982	Manchester City	H	0–1		20,797
13 March 1982	Sunderland	A	1–0	Worthington	20,285
16 March 1982	Wolverhampton Wanderers	A	0–1		11,729
20 March 1982	Nottingham Forest	H	1–1	Worthington (pen)	18,036
27 March 1982	Notts County	A	1–2	Worthington	13,316
3 April 1982	Manchester United	H	0–0		31,118
6 April 1982	Middlesbrough	A	0–0		15,494
10 April 1982	Birmingham City	A	1–0	Hart	14,497
13 April 1982	Middlesbrough	H	1–1	Purlane	20,458
17 April 1982	Southampton	H	1–3	Worthington	21,353
24 April 1982	West Ham United	A	3–4	Connor, Graham, Flynn	24,748
28 April 1982	Aston Villa	A	4–1	Graham, Worthington 2, Connor	20,566
1 May 1982	Stoke City	H	0–0		17,775
4 May 1982	Everton	A	0–1		17,137
8 May 1982	Tottenham Hotspur	A	1–2	Worthington	35,020
12 May 1982	Birmingham City	H	3–3	Worthington 2 (1 pen), Connor	18,583
19 May 1982	Brighton & Hove Albion	H	2–1	Hamson, Hird	19,831
22 May 1982	West Bromwich Albion	A	0–2		23,118

=== FA Cup ===
Win	Draw	Loss

FA Cup match details
Round	Date	Opponent	Venue	Result F–A	Scorers	Attendance
Third round	2 January 1982	Wolverhampton Wanderers	A	3–1	Hamson, Hird, E. Gray	20,923
Fourth round	23 January 1982	Tottenham Hotspur	A	0–1		46,126

=== Football League Cup ===
Win	Draw	Loss

League Cup match details
Round	Date	Opponent	Venue	Result F–A	Scorers	Attendance
Second round (first leg)	7 October 1981	Ipswich Town	H	0–1		16,994
Second round (second leg)	27 October 1981	Ipswich Town	A	0–3		16,494

== Bibliography ==
- Jarred, Martin; MacDonald, Malcolm (1986). Leeds United: a complete record 1919–1986. Derby: Breedon Books Sport. ISBN 0-907969-17-8. OCLC 14977257.
