= Alan Finley =

English football defender

Personal information
- Full name: Alan James Finley
- Date of birth: 10 December 1967 (age 58)
- Place of birth: Liverpool, England
- Height: 6 ft 3 in (1.91 m)
- Position: Defender

Senior career*
Years	Team	Apps	(Gls)
1986–1988	Marine		
1988–1990	Shrewsbury Town	63	(2)
1990–1994	Stockport County	66	(5)
1992	→ Carlisle United (loan)	1	(0)
1993	→ Rochdale (loan)	1	(0)
1994	Northwich Victoria		
1994–1996	Runcorn		
1996	Altrincham		
1997	Runcorn		
- * Club domestic league appearances and goals

Alan James Finley (born 10 December 1967) is an English former professional footballer who played in the Football League for Carlisle United, Rochdale, Shrewsbury Town and Stockport County.

== Honours ==
Stockport County

- Football League Trophy runner-up: 1992–93
