= 1986–87 Leeds United A.F.C. season =

1986–87 season of Leeds United

Leeds United
1986–87 season
- Chairman: Leslie Silver
- Manager: Billy Bremner
- Stadium: Elland Road
- Second Division: 4th
- Play-offs: Final
- FA Cup: Semi-final
- League Cup: Second round
- Full Members' Cup: First round
- Top goalscorer: League: Ian Baird; John Sheridan (15 each); All: Ian Baird (19)
- Highest home attendance: 31,395 vs Charlton Athletic (29 May 1987, Play-offs)
- Lowest home attendance: 3,960 vs Bradford City (1 October 1986, Full Members' Cup)
- Average home league attendance: 31,178

The 1986–87 season was Leeds United's 60th season in the Football League, and their fifth consecutive season in the Football League Second Division, the second tier of English football, where they finished 4th, qualifying for the Football League Second Division play-offs, where they lost in the final to Charlton Athletic. Alongside the Second Division, the club competed in the FA Cup and the Football League Cup, being eliminated in the semi-finals of the former and the second round of the latter.

== Background ==
Leeds United had played in the second tier of English football since they were relegated in the 1981–82 season. Billy Bremner had been appointed as their manager in October 1985, replacing Eddie Gray. After leading the club to 14th position in the league that season, Bremner made a number of changes to playing staff, including bringing in at least ten players. Along with the fourth-place finish in the league, Bremner oversaw Leeds' run to the semi-final of the 1986–87 FA Cup where they lost to Coventry City F.C.

== Competitions ==
=== Second Division ===
==== League table ====
Pos	Team	Pld	W	D	L	GF	GA	GD	Pts	Qualification or relegation
2	Portsmouth (P)	42	23	9	10	53	28	+25	78	Promotion to the First Division
3	Oldham Athletic	42	22	9	11	65	44	+21	75	Qualification for the Second Division play-offs
4	Leeds United	42	19	11	12	58	44	+14	68	Qualification for the Second Division play-offs
5	Ipswich Town	42	17	13	12	59	43	+16	64	Qualification for the Second Division play-offs
6	Crystal Palace	42	19	5	18	51	53	−2	62	

Rules for classification: 1) Points; 2) Goal difference; 3) Goals scored
(P) Promoted

==== Matches ====
Win	Draw	Loss

Second Division match results
Date	Opponent	Venue	Result F–A	Scorers	Attendance
23 August 1986	Blackburn Rovers	Away	1–2	Ritchie	8,346
25 August 1986	Stoke City	Home	2–1	Sheridan, Baird	13,334
30 August 1986	Sheffield United	Home	0–1		18,294
2 September 1986	Barnsley	Away	1–0	Baird	6,839
6 September 1986	Huddersfield Town	Away	1–1	Sheridan	9,306
13 September 1986	Reading	Home	3–2	Edwards, Ritchie, Buckley	12,248
20 September 1986	Bradford City	Away	0–2		13,525
27 September 1986	Hull City	Home	3–0	Ritchie (pen.), Baird, Ormsby	13,551
4 October 1986	Plymouth Argyle	Away	1–1	Baird	11,923
11 October 1986	Crystal Palace	Home	3–0	Sheridan (pen.), Ormsby, Edwards	14,316
18 October 1986	Portsmouth	Home	3–1	Sheridan (pen.), Ritchie, Baird	21,361
25 October 1986	Grimsby Town	Away	0–0		7,223
1 November 1986	Shrewsbury Town	Home	1–0	Aspin	14,966
8 November 1986	Millwall	Away	0–1		6,869
15 November 1986	Oldham Athletic	Home	0–2		21,052
21 November 1986	Birmingham City	Away	1–2	Sheridan	7,836
29 November 1986	Derby County	Home	2–0	Sheridan, Edwards	19,129
6 December 1986	West Bromwich Albion	Away	0–3		19,853
13 December 1986	Brighton & Hove Albion	Home	3–1	Sheridan, Snodin, Baird	12,014
21 December 1986	Stoke City	Away	2–7	Baird, Sheridan (pen.)	12,358
26 December 1986	Sunderland	Home	1–1	Bennett (o.g.)	21,286
27 December 1986	Oldham Athletic	Away	1–0	Ritchie	8,477
1 January 1987	Ipswich Town	Away	0–2		14,125
3 January 1987	Huddersfield Town	Home	1–1	Baird	17,983
24 January 1987	Blackburn Rovers	Home	0–0		14,452
7 February 1987	Sheffield United	Away	0–0		12,494
14 February 1987	Barnsley	Home	2–2	Baird, Sheridan	14,216
28 February 1987	Bradford City	Home	1–0	Edwards	21,802
7 March 1987	Grimsby Town	Home	2–0	Ritchie, Sheridan (pen.)	14,270
10 March 1987	Portsmouth	Away	1–1	Adams	13,745
21 March 1987	Crystal Palace	Away	0–1		8,781
28 March 1987	Plymouth Argyle	Home	4–0	Sheridan, Baird (3)	18,618
4 April 1987	Millwall	Home	2–0	Baird, Ritchie	18,304
8 April 1987	Hull City	Away	0–0		9,531
14 April 1987	Shrewsbury Town	Away	2–0	Sheridan, Pearson	4,186
18 April 1987	Ipswich Town	Home	3–2	McDonald, Sheridan, Ormsby	24,839
20 April 1987	Sunderland	Away	1–1	Pearson	14,725
22 April 1987	Reading	Away	1–2	Pearson	7,415
25 April 1987	Birmingham City	Home	4–0	Sheridan, Baird (2), Edwards	19,100
2 May 1987	Derby County	Away	1–2	Ashurst	20,087
4 May 1987	West Bromwich Albion	Home	3–2	Sheridan (pen.), Pearson, Ormsby	24,688
9 May 1987	Brighton & Hove Albion	Away	1–0	Edwards	8,139

==== Play-offs ====
14 May 1987
Semi-final, first leg

Leeds United	1–0	Oldham Athletic
Edwards

Elland Road, Leeds
Attendance: 29,472
Referee: George Tyson
17 May 1987
Semi-final, second leg

Oldham Athletic	2–1 (a.e.t.) Leeds United win on away goals	Leeds United
Williams, Cecere		Edwards

Boundary Park, Oldham
Attendance: 19,216
Referee: George Courtney
23 May 1987
Final, first leg

Charlton Athletic	1–0	Leeds United
Melrose

Selhurst Park, London
Attendance: 16,680
Referee: Roger Milford
25 May 1987
Final, second leg

Leeds United	1–0	Charlton Athletic
Ormsby

Elland Road, Leeds
Attendance: 31,395
Referee: Brian Hill
29 May 1987
Final replay

Leeds United	1–2 (a.e.t.)	Charlton Athletic
Sheridan		Shirtliff

St Andrew's, Birmingham
Attendance: 15,841
Referee: Allan Gunn

=== FA Cup ===
FA Cup match details
Round	Date	Opponent	Venue	Result F–A	Scorers	Attendance
Third round	11 January 1987	Telford United	Away (Note: Match played at The Hawthorns instead of Telford's home stadium)	2–1	Baird (2)	6,460
Fourth round	3 February 1987	Swindon Town	Away	2–1	Quinn (o.g.), Baird	14,031
Fifth round	21 February 1987	Queens Park Rangers	Home	2–1	Baird, Ormsby	31,324
Sixth round	15 March 1987	Wigan Athletic	Away	2–0	Stiles, Adams	12,479
Semi-final	12 April 1987	Coventry City	Neutral	2–3 (a.e.t.)	Rennie, Edwards	51,372

=== League Cup ===
League Cup match details
Round	Date	Opponent	Venue	Result F–A	Scorers	Attendance
Second round, first leg	23 September 1986	Oldham Athletic	Away	2–3	Aspin, Taylor	5,569
Second round, second leg	8 October 1986	Oldham Athletic	Home	0–1		11,449

=== Full Members' Cup ===
Full Members' Cup match details
Round	Date	Opponent	Venue	Result F–A	Scorers	Attendance
First round	1 October 1986	Bradford City	Home	0–1 (a.e.t.)		3,960
