= 1982–83 Leeds United A.F.C. season =

Leeds United
1982–83 season
- Chairman: Manny Cussins
- Manager: Eddie Gray (player-manager)
- Stadium: Elland Road
- Second Division: 8th
- FA Cup: Fourth round
- League Cup: Third round

The 1982–83 season was Leeds United's 56th season in the Football League, and their first season back in the Second Division, the second tier of English football, following relegation from the First Division in the 1981–82 season. The club finished 8th in the Second Division, and also competed in two cup competitions: the FA Cup, where they were eliminated in the fourth round, and the Football League Cup which they were eliminated from in the third round.

Following relegation after the end of the previous season, manager Allan Clarke was sacked on 25 June 1982. Eddie Gray was appointed as player-manager in early July.

== Competitions ==
=== First Division ===
==== League table ====
Pos	Team	Pld	W	D	L	GF	GA	GD	Pts
6	Sheffield Wednesday	42	16	15	11	60	47	+13	63
7	Oldham Athletic	42	14	19	9	64	47	+17	61
8	Leeds United	42	13	21	8	51	46	+5	60
9	Shrewsbury Town	42	15	14	13	48	48	0	59
10	Barnsley	42	14	15	13	57	55	+2	57

Rules for classification: 1) Points; 2) Goal difference; 3) Goals scored

==== Matches ====
Win	Draw	Loss

Second Division match results
Date	Opponent	Venue	Result F–A	Scorers	Attendance
28 August 1982	Grimsby Town	A	1–1	Connor	16,137
4 September 1982	Wolverhampton Wanderers	H	0–0		16,462
8 September 1982	Leicester City	A	1–0	Butterworth	12,963
11 September 1982	Sheffield Wednesday	A	3–2	Worthington (2), Butterworth	29,050
18 September 1982	Derby County	H	2–1	F. Gray, Worthington	16,889
25 September 1982	Fulham	A	2–3	Thomas, Graham	12,798
2 October 1982	Cambridge United	H	2–1	Butterworth, Hird	14,910
9 October 1982	Chelsea	A	0–0		25,358
16 October 1982	Carlisle United	H	1–1	Hart	14,141
20 October 1982	Burnley	H	3–1	Worthington, Butterworth, Hird	13,827
23 October 1982	Blackburn Rovers	A	0–0		12,040
30 October 1982	Newcastle United	H	3–1	Worthington, Burns, Butterworth	26,570
6 November 1982	Charlton Athletic	H	1–2	Connor	15,148
13 November 1982	Crystal Palace	A	1–1	Connor	11,673
20 November 1982	Middlesbrough	H	0–0		18,482
27 November 1982	Barnsley	A	1–2	Butterworth	21,530
4 December 1982	Queens Park Rangers	H	0–1		11,528
11 December 1982	Rotherham United	A	1–0	Gavin	13,034
18 December 1982	Shrewsbury Town	H	1–1	Hird	8,741
26 December 1982	Oldham Athletic	A	2–2	Burns, Sheridan	15,658
28 December 1982	Bolton Wanderers	H	1–1	Graham	16,180
1 January 1983	Middlesbrough	A	0–0		17,000
3 January 1983	Wolverhampton Wanderers	A	0–3		22,567
15 January 1983	Grimsby Town	H	1–0	Butterworth	13,583
22 January 1983	Derby County	A	3–3	Graham (2), Hart	17,005
12 February 1983	Cambridge United	A	0–0		6,909
19 February 1983	Chelsea	H	3–3	Butterworth, F. Gray (pen.), Graham	19,365
26 February 1983	Carlisle United	A	2–2	Connor, Butterworth	6,419
5 March 1983	Blackburn Rovers	H	2–1	F. Gray (pen.), Hird	12,280
12 March 1983	Newcastle United	A	1–2	Connor	24,580
19 March 1983	Charlton Athletic	A	1–0	Sheridan	8,229
26 March 1983	Crystal Palace	H	2–1	Ritchie, F. Gray (pen.)	13,973
2 April 1983	Bolton Wanderers	A	2–1	Butterworth, Hart	10,784
5 April 1983	Oldham Athletic	H	0–0		18,442
9 April 1983	Burnley	A	2–1	Ritchie, Scott (o.g.)	12,149
16 April 1983	Fulham	H	1–1	Wright	24,328
23 April 1983	Queens Park Rangers	A	0–1		19,573
27 April 1983	Sheffield Wednesday	H	1–2	Ritchie	16,591
30 April 1983	Barnsley	H	0–0		15,344
2 May 1983	Leicester City	H	2–2	O'Neill (o.g.), F. Gray (pen.)	14,442
7 May 1983	Shrewsbury Town	A	0–0		6,052
14 May 1983	Rotherham United	H	2–2	Butterworth, Donnelly	14,958

=== FA Cup ===
Win	Draw	Loss

FA Cup match results
Round	Date	Opponent	Venue	Result F–A	Scorers	Attendance
Third round	8 January 1983	Preston North End	Home	3–0	Sheridan, Connor, Graham	16,816
Fourth round	29 January 1983	Arsenal	Away	1–1	Nicholas (o.g.)	33,930
Fourth round replay	2 February 1983	Arsenal	Home	1–1 (a.e.t.)	Butterworth	24,410
Fourth round, second replay	9 February 1983	Arsenal	Away	1–2	Connor	26,802

=== League Cup ===
Win	Draw	Loss

League Cup match details
Round	Date	Opponent	Venue	Result F–A	Scorers	Attendance
Second round, first leg	6 October 1982	Newcastle United	Home	0–1		24,012
Second round, second leg	27 October 1982	Newcastle United	Away	4–1 (a.e.t.)	Saunders (o.g.), Worthington, Butterworth, Connor	24,173
Third round	10 November 1982	Huddersfield Town	Home	0–1		24,215

== Bibliography ==
- Jarred, Martin; MacDonald, Malcolm (1986). Leeds United: a complete record 1919–1986. Derby: Breedon Books Sport. ISBN 0-907969-17-8. OCLC 14977257.
