= Rowan's Report =

- Rowan's Report title sequence
- Genre: Documentary
- Directed by: Alister Hallum
- Starring: Nick Rowan
- Country of origin: United Kingdom
- Original language: English
- No. of series: 2
- No. of episodes: 19

Production
- Producer: Joy Whitby
- Running time: 30 minutes

Original release
- Network: ITV
- Release: 2 August 1982 – 30 June 1983

Rowan's Report is an ITV documentary series, shown over nineteen fifteen minute episodes. The series follows Nick Rowan as each week he interviews some of the country's most successful children. The series was produced by Yorkshire Television and distributed by Thames Television.

== Episodes ==
=== Series 1 ===
No.	Title	Directed by	Original release date	Ref
1	"Adam Sunderland"	Alister Hallum	26 July 1982	
A ten year old TV commercial star.
2	"Jayne Fisher"	Alister Hallum	2 August 1982	
A young author of children's books.
3	"Neil Aspin"	Alister Hallum	9 August 1982	
A young football apprentice who has played for Leeds United.
4	"Circus Pinder"	Alister Hallum	16 August 1982	
Young circus clowns George and Tommy Pinder.
5	"Jacob Rees-Mogg"	Alister Hallum	23 August 1982	
One of the youngest stock market investors.
6	"St. Winifred's School Choir"	Alister Hallum	6 September 1982	
A successful chart-topping School Choir.

=== Series 2 ===
No.	Title	Directed by	Original release date	Ref
1	"Child Model"	Alister Hallum	7 April 1983	
Loriana Kay a thirteen year old model and would-be pop star.
2	"Young Aristocrat"	Alister Hallum	14 April 1983	
Seven year old Lord James Russell in this private suite at Woburn Abbey.
3	"Latin American Dancers"	Alister Hallum	21 April 1983	
A demonstration by the British juniors of Latin American Dance Championships.
4	"Show Jumper"	Alister Hallum	28 April 1983	
Show jumper Peter Murphy in action at the Great Yorkshire Show.
5	"Pop Singer"	Alister Hallum	5 May 1983	
Annabella Lwin a singer of the group Bow Wow Wow.
6	"Car Racing"	Alister Hallum	12 May 1983	
A thirteen old American MiniStox Car Racer, Garry Sparkes.
7	"CND Campaigner"	Alister Hallum	19 May 1983	
Anna Malos, a youth campaigner for Nuclear Disarmament.
8	"Actor"	Alister Hallum	26 May 1983	
Lee Whitlock, who is appearing on new series Shine on Harvey Moon.
9	"Long Distance Swimmer"	Alister Hallum	2 June 1983	
Yvonne Carter a fifteen year old, long-distance swimmer.
10	"Choirboy"	Alister Hallum	9 June 1983	
Richard Murray, head chorister of Westminster Abbey Choir School.
11	"Water Skier"	Alister Hallum	16 June 1983	
Andrew Rooke, the 1982 European Dauphin Water Skiing Champion in the under sixteens category.
12	"Playwright"	Alister Hallum	23 June 1983	
Susanna Kleeman a young playwright.
13	"Fairground Attendant"	Alister Hallum	30 June 1983	
Anthony Parkin a Fairground Attendant.
