= Mick Wallace (footballer) =

English football defender (born 1970)

Personal information
- Full name: Michael Wallace
- Date of birth: 5 October 1970 (age 56)
- Place of birth: Farnworth, England
- Position: Defender

Senior career*
Years	Team	Apps	(Gls)
1989–1992	Manchester City	0	(0)
1992–1995	Stockport County	70	(5)
1995	Witton Albion		
1995–1998	Netherfield		
1998	Leigh RMI		
- * Club domestic league appearances and goals

Michael Wallace (born 5 October 1970) is an English former professional footballer who played in the Football League for Stockport County. Wallace was sent-off in the 1994 Football League Second Division play-off final against Burnley.

== Honours ==
Stockport County

- Football League Trophy runner-up: 1992–93
