= Peter Duffield =

English footballer and manager (born 1969)

Personal information
- Full name: Peter Duffield
- Date of birth: 4 February 1969 (age 57)
- Place of birth: Middlesbrough, England
- Height: 5 ft 6 in (1.68 m)
- Position: Striker

Senior career*
Years	Team	Apps	(Gls)
1987–1993	Sheffield United	58	(16)
1988	→ Halifax Town (loan)	12	(6)
1991	→ Rotherham United (loan)	17	(5)
1992	→ Blackpool (loan)	5	(1)
1992	→ AFC Bournemouth (loan)	0	(0)
1993	→ Crewe Alexandra (loan)	2	(0)
1993	→ Stockport County (loan)	7	(4)
1993–1995	Hamilton Academical	72	(39)
1995–1996	Airdrieonians	24	(7)
1996–1997	Raith Rovers	51	(11)
1997–1998	Greenock Morton	28	(9)
1998–1999	Falkirk	15	(2)
1999	→ Darlington (loan)	14	(2)
1999–2000	Darlington	32	(12)
2000–2003	York City	45	(19)
2003–2004	Boston United	45	(9)
2004	Carlisle United	10	(3)
2004–2006	Alfreton Town		
2006–2011	Retford United		
Total		437	(145)

Managerial career
- 2006–2007: Retford United (player assistant manager)
- 2007–2011: Retford United (player-manager)
- 2011–2014: Belper Town
- 2014–2016: Handsworth Parramore
- * Club domestic league appearances and goals

Peter Duffield (born 4 February 1969) is an English former professional footballer. A striker, he played for sixteen league clubs in 17 years.

Duffield began his career as an 18-year-old with Sheffield United in 1987. In his time at Bramall Lane he made 58 league appearances and scored 16 goals, including a perfect penalty record of 7 scored from 7 taken which is a club record. Duffield also holds the club record for being the first Sheffield United substitute to be substituted after playing 14 minutes at Craven Cottage against Fulham on 29 April 1989. His last league start was on 10 December 1989 when he broke his leg at Swindon Town. He went on loan to six clubs in as many years, namely Halifax Town, Rotherham United, Blackpool, AFC Bournemouth, Crewe Alexandra and Stockport County.

In September 1993 he joined Scottish club Hamilton Academical, where he made his name. In two years at Douglas Park he scored 38 goals in 72 league appearances.

After leaving Hamilton in 1995, Duffield went on to play for four other Scottish clubs: Airdrie, Raith Rovers, Morton and Falkirk.

In 1999, he signed for Darlington on loan, and later that year made the move permanent. He was on the move again the following year, however, joining York City.

Duffield then moved to Boston United for a season, before joining Carlisle United in 2004.

After Carlisle were relegated to the Conference, Duffield joined Conference North side Alfreton Town

Duffield joined Retford United in 2006 as a player assistant manager. At the close of the 2006–07 season, Duffield was named Retford United manager but will still continue as a player.

In September 2011, Duffield replaced Tommy Taylor as manager of Belper Town. He resigned from the club after a 5–1 defeat at Buxton in September 2014. He managed Handsworth Parramore between October 2014 and January 2016.

== Honours ==
Stockport County

- Football League Trophy runner-up: 1992–93
