= Fred Crump =

English footballer

Personal information
- Full name: Frederick Crump
- Date of birth: 1880
- Place of birth: Stourbridge, England
- Height: 5 ft 6 in (1.68 m)
- Position: Forward

Senior career*
Years	Team	Apps	(Gls)
189?–1898	Smethwick		
1898–1899	Stourbridge		
1899–1900	Derby County	6	(1)
1900–1902	Glossop	65	(27)
1902–190?	Northampton Town		
190?–1905	Stalybridge Rovers		
1905–1908	Stockport County	89	(29)
1908–1909	Brighton & Hove Albion	11	(2)
1909–191?	Walsall		
- Darlaston
- * Club domestic league appearances and goals

Frederick Crump (1880 – after 1910) was an English professional footballer who played as a forward in the Football League for Derby County, Glossop and Stockport County and in the Southern League for Northampton Town and Brighton & Hove Albion. Born in Stourbridge, Worcestershire, Crump also played non-league football for Smethwick, Stourbridge, Stalybridge Rovers, Walsall and Darlaston.

In 1898, while a Smethwick player, Crump was a member of the Birmingham County Football Association team for a representative match against the Scottish Junior XI.
