= Kevin Francis (footballer) =

English footballer

Personal information
- Full name: Kevin Derek Michael Francis
- Date of birth: 6 December 1967 (age 58)
- Place of birth: Birmingham, England
- Height: 6 ft 7 in (2.01 m)
- Position: Striker

Senior career*
Years	Team	Apps	(Gls)
1988–1989	Mile Oak Rovers		
1989–1991	Derby County	10	(0)
1991–1995	Stockport County	152	(88)
1995–1998	Birmingham City	73	(13)
1998–2000	Oxford United	36	(8)
2000	Stockport County	4	(0)
2000	Exeter City	7	(1)
2000–2001	Hull City	24	(5)
2001–2003	Hednesford Town	41	(9)
2003–2005	Redditch United		
2005	Studley		
Total		347	(124)

International career
1998	Saint Kitts & Nevis	2	(0)
- * Club domestic league appearances and goals

Kevin Derek Michael Francis (born 6 December 1967) is a former professional footballer who played as a striker. At 6 ft 7 in (2.01 m), Francis was at one time the tallest player in the Football League. He is best known for his four-year spell at Stockport County, where he scored 117 goals.

== Football career ==
=== Early career ===
Francis started his career at Mile Oak Rovers, before a big move to Derby County in 1989. He made 17 appearances for Derby, 15 as a substitute, scoring once in the FA Cup.

=== Stockport County ===
Danny Bergara spotted Francis whilst he was playing a reserve match and immediately wanted to sign him. County paid Derby £45,000 in March 1991. He scored 5 goals as County finished as runner-up in Division Four. The following season, he notched 26 as County made it into two Wembley finals, followed by 33 in 1992–93 season as Stockport made it to the final of the Autoglass Shield. In his final full season he produced another 30 goals as County yet again made it to Wembley, however he was to lose for a fourth time. In 1994–95 he had already scored 13 times before he left Stockport in January 1995, for £800,000, a record at the time for County.

He did make a return to County in 2000, but it was short-lived as after just four appearances he broke his leg in a match versus Manchester City. He was released at the end of the season, a sad way to end his glorious County career.

Due to his excellent goal-scoring feats he earned the honour of "County Player of the Century" in 2002. Francis appeared back at Edgeley Park on 18 July 2014 as one of 30 Stockport County legends to play in Mike Flynn's testimonial match. Francis was welcomed back like a hero by the Stockport fans and stayed after the game to meet the fans.

=== Birmingham City ===
In January 1995, Francis was signed for £800,000 by Barry Fry for his hometown club Birmingham City, and enjoyed a successful period, scoring 21 times in 94 appearances. This included the most successful season in his career, picking up a Division Two Champions medal as Birmingham secured promotion back to the 1st Division, and a winners medal in the Football League Trophy Final of the same season. Birmingham beat Carlisle United 1–0 at Wembley to secure a season double, with Francis finally breaking his Wembley duck after previously enduring four successive defeats with Stockport. Francis also played a major part in Birmingham's eventual promotion that season, scoring 8 times in the promotion run-in, (bringing his season tally to 21) including the first goal in a vital 2–0 home victory against second placed Brentford (only one team secured automatic promotion from the league that season).

Francis also played for Birmingham for a further two seasons in the 1st Division, although his time at St Andrews was disrupted by injury. Despite this, he played a major part in Birmingham's run to the League Cup Semi-Finals in the 95–96 season, scoring a brace as Birmingham eliminated Premiership Middlesbrough 2–0 in a 4th Round replay at St Andrews. He also opened the scoring with a 25-yard rocket in the Semi-Final 1st Leg at St Andrews against another Premier League side, Leeds Utd. Unfortunately for Francis and Birmingham, Leeds Utd came back to win the first leg 2–1 before securing a 3–0 victory in the second leg at Elland Road, to progress to the final on a 5-1 aggregate.

=== Later career ===
Francis left Birmingham in 1998 moving to Oxford United, then Exeter City (for whom he scored once, against Lincoln City) and Hull City followed, before Francis exited the Football League and joined Hednesford Town. He finished his career off with spells at Redditch United and Studley before retiring in 2005.

== Club statistics ==
Club performance			League		Cup		League Cup		Continental		Total	
Season	Club	League	Apps	Goals	Apps	Goals	Apps	Goals	Apps	Goals	Apps	Goals
England			League		FA Cup		League Cup		Europe		Total	
1989–91	Derby County	Football League	10	0	3	1	3	0	1	0	17	1
1991–95	Stockport County	Football League	152	88	9	6	12	5	25	18	198	117
1995–98	Birmingham City	Football League	73	13	6	2	11	5	4	1	94	21
1998–00	Oxford United	Football League	36	8	3	0	0	0	1	0	40	8
2000	Stockport County	Football League	4	0	0	0	0	0	0	0	4	0
2000	Exeter City	Football League	7	1	1	0	0	0	1	0	9	1
2000–01	Hull City	Football League	24	5	0	0	0	0	0	0	24	5
Career total			306	115	22	9	26	10	32	19	386	153

== Personal life ==
Born in Birmingham, England, Francis played international football for Saint Kitts and Nevis, qualifying through his parents, who were both born in the country. He played his first international matches in the Caribbean Cup in April 1998.

He moved to Canada, where he worked as a police officer in Calgary, Alberta. He is married to Sharon, with whom he has two children, Stacey and Keisha. Stacey plays netball for England and West Coast Fever in Perth, Western Australia as a defender.

== Honours ==
Stockport County

- Football League Fourth Division second-place promotion: 1990–91
- Associate Members' Cup / Football League Trophy runner-up: 1991–92, 1992–93

Birmingham City

- Football League Second Division: 1994–95
- Football League Trophy: 1994–95
