= Chris Beaumont =

English footballer (born 1965)

Personal information
- Full name: Christopher Paul Beaumont
- Date of birth: 5 December 1965 (age 60)
- Place of birth: Sheffield, England
- Height: 5 ft 11 in (1.80 m)
- Position: Midfielder

Senior career*
Years	Team	Apps	(Gls)
1987–1988	Denaby United	?	(?)
1988–1989	Rochdale	34	(7)
1989–1996	Stockport County	258	(39)
1996–2001	Chesterfield	158	(6)
2001–2002	Ossett Town	37	(6)
Total		487	(58)
- * Club domestic league appearances and goals

Christopher Paul Beaumont (born 5 December 1965) is an English retired professional footballer who played as a midfielder for several teams in the Football League.

== Career ==
Perhaps his best remembered spell was with Chesterfield which saw Beaumont score the winning goal in the 1996-97 FA Cup quarter final against Wrexham. He also came on as a substitute in the semi-final against Middlesbrough at Old Trafford and set up Jamie Hewitt's dramatic equaliser to take the tie to a replay. Beaumont played for the Spireites over 150 times and left the club in 2001 which resulted in a spell at Ossett Town. Beaumont used to run a post office but now works at a local secondary school in Sheffield. He is known to attend frequent Stockport County matches when time allows.

== Honours ==
Stockport County

- Associate Members' Cup / Football League Trophy runner-up: 1991–92, 1992–93
