= Charlie McDonnell (footballer) =

English footballer (1936–2010)

Personal information
- Date of birth: 15 July 1936
- Place of birth: Birkenhead
- Date of death: 7 June 2010 (aged 73)
- Position: Inside forward

Senior career*
Years	Team	Apps	(Gls)
–1957	Stork		
1957–1961	Tranmere Rovers	67	(25)
1961–1964	Stockport County	84	(32)
1963–1965	Tranmere Rovers	45	(25)
1965–1966	Southport	10	(1)
1966–	Glentoran		
Total		206	(83)
- * Club domestic league appearances and goals

Charlie McDonnell (15 July 1936 – 7 June 2010) was an English professional footballer. He played as inside forward for Stork, Tranmere Rovers, Stockport County, Southport and Glentoran.
