= Derek Hodgkinson (footballer) =

English footballer

Personal information
- Full name: Derek John Hodgkinson
- Date of birth: 30 April 1944 (age 82)
- Place of birth: Banwell, England
- Position: Inside forward

Youth career
- Margate

Senior career*
Years	Team	Apps	(Gls)
1963–1964	Manchester City	1	(1)
1964–1966	Stockport County	46	(9)
1966	Bangor City		
1966–1967	Macclesfield Town	34	(10)
- * Club domestic league appearances and goals

Derek John Hodgkinson (born 30 April 1944) is an English footballer, who played as an inside forward in the Football League for Manchester City and Stockport County.
