= Norman Rodgers (footballer) =

English footballer

Personal information
- Full name: Norman Rodgers
- Date of birth: 1891
- Place of birth: Stockport, England
- Date of death: 1947 (aged 55–56)
- Height: 5 ft 8 in (1.73 m)
- Position: Winger

Senior career*
Years	Team	Apps	(Gls)
1908–1909	Park Albion (Heaton Norris)		
1909–1910	Hooley Hill		
1911–1919	Stockport County	156	(72)
1919–1923	Blackburn Rovers	43	(21)
Total		199	(93)
- * Club domestic league appearances and goals

Norman Rodgers (1891–1947) was an English footballer who played in the Football League for Blackburn Rovers and Stockport County.
