= Aidan Butterworth =

English footballer (born 1961)

Personal information
- Full name: Aidan James Butterworth
- Date of birth: 7 November 1961 (age 64)
- Place of birth: Leeds, England
- Height: 1.73 m (5 ft 8 in)
- Position: Forward

Senior career*
Years	Team	Apps	(Gls)
1980–1984	Leeds United	54	(15)
1984–1986	Doncaster Rovers	50	(5)
Total		104	(19)

International career
1977	England Schoolboys	3	(0)
- * Club domestic league appearances and goals

Aidan Butterworth (born 7 November 1961) is an English former professional footballer who played for Leeds United and Doncaster Rovers. Earlier in his career, he played for England's U15 and U18 teams.

In later life, he has become associated with Toronto Walking Soccer Club, a walking football club in Toronto, Canada.
