= Danny Bergara =

Uruguayan footballer and manager (1942-2007)

Personal information
- Full name: Daniel Alberto Bergara de Medina
- Date of birth: 24 July 1942
- Place of birth: Montevideo, Uruguay
- Date of death: 25 July 2007 (aged 65)
- Place of death: England
- Position: Striker

Senior career*
Years	Team	Apps	(Gls)
1958–1962	Racing Club	50	(?)
1962–1967	Real Mallorca	110	(33)
1967–1971	Sevilla	96	(35)
1971–1972	Tenerife	49	(7)

International career
1958	Uruguay U17	1	(0)
1984-?	Brunei		

Managerial career
- 1973–1978: Luton Town (Youth Team)
- 1978–1983: Sheffield United (Youth Team)
- 1984: Brunei
- 1986: Middlesbrough (Assistant Manager)
- 1988–1989: Rochdale
- 1989–1995: Stockport County
- 1995–1996: Sheffield Wednesday (Assistant Manager)
- 1996–1997: Rotherham United
- 1997: Doncaster Rovers
- 1998: Grantham Town
- * Club domestic league appearances and goals

Daniel Alberto Bergara de Medina (24 July 1942 – 25 July 2007) was a footballer and manager from Uruguay.

== Playing career ==
Born in Montevideo, Uruguay, Bergara began his playing career at the age of 16, playing for Racing Club in the Uruguayan First Division, picking up a handful of under-21 caps for Uruguay, before moving to Spain in 1962 where he was top scorer for Real Mallorca for four seasons and Sevilla for two seasons. While playing in Spain Bergara married an English travel guide, Jan, and when he retired from playing football they moved to England.

== Managerial career ==
Bergara coached the reserve teams at Luton Town and Sheffield United before getting his first managerial job at Rochdale in August 1988. Bergara is often wrongly referred to as the first foreign manager in English football – he was in fact preceded by managers such as the South African Peter Hauser, who managed Chester City between 1963 and 1968. Bergara was the first manager born outside the British Isles to lead an English club out at Wembley, when he took Stockport County to the 1992 Autoglass Trophy final.

=== Stockport County ===
In March 1989, after just seven months at Rochdale, he took over as manager of Stockport County, also in the Fourth Division. He ensured their Fourth Division survival that season and prevented them from slipping into the GM Vauxhall Conference. They reached the playoffs in 1989–90, only to suffer a heavy defeat by Chesterfield in the semi-final. In 1990–91 he guided County to promotion from the Fourth Division, missing out on the title by a single point. In 1991–92, County took the Third Division by storm by beating Swansea City 5–0 on the opening day, and quickly became contenders in the race for promotion. County reached Wembley twice in the space of ten days in the Play-Offs and Autoglass Trophy that season, losing 2–1 to Peterborough United in the play-offs and 1–0 to Stoke City in the Football League Trophy.

1992–93 brought a similar season for Bergara and Stockport County. The club lost in a semi-final play-off 2–1 to Port Vale. Stockport County lost to the same opponents in the Autoglass Trophy Final, 2–1.

1993–94 saw a third successive appearance in play-offs for Bergara's Stockport, but they lost 2–1 to Burnley in the final at Wembley. Referee David Elleray controversially sent off two Stockport players, Mike Wallace and Chris Beaumont. This was the first time that the same side has ever had two players sent off at Wembley.

Just before the end of the 1994–95, Bergara was sacked as Stockport manager after an incident with the assistant manager and was succeeded by Dave Jones.

=== Later career ===
Bergara also managed the Brunei national team and the England Under-18 and Under-20 sides, with a World Youth Cup win also to his name.

Shortly after leaving Stockport, Bergara joined Sheffield Wednesday as assistant to new manager David Pleat, but after one season departed to become manager of Rotherham United. His tenure at Rotherham was not a success and he left after just one season.

A brief spell at Doncaster Rovers followed, during which time the club were featured in the 1998 Channel 5 'fly-on-the-wall' documentary "They Think It's All Rovers".

For the 1998–99 season, he was named manager of Grantham Town, who had just won promotion to the Southern League Premier Division. A string of poor results saw Bergara become the club's Director of Football and the club's Chief Scout, Tony Kenworthy, becoming manager. Later he scouted for Sunderland.

== Death ==
Bergara died after a short illness on 25 July 2007, one day after his 65th birthday. Following the news of his death, many Stockport County fans left their tributes in Edgeley Park's Cheadle End. On 28 July, Stockport County arranged "Danny Day" when the team played Cardiff City in a pre-season friendly.

In an emotionally charged atmosphere, before kick off "My Way" by Frank Sinatra was played at Edgeley Park, as it was Bergara's favourite song. Managers of both teams, Jim Gannon (Stockport) and Dave Jones (Cardiff City, coincidentally the man who had succeeded Bergara as Stockport manager 12 years earlier) paid their tributes by laying flowers which spelt "DANNY" in front of the Cheadle End.

Before the match there was a specially designated two minutes for the fans to sing a rendition of "Danny Bergara's Blue 'n White Army", which ended up continuing for over 30 minutes. Stockport won the friendly 6–4.

== Legacy ==
During the close season before the start of the 2012–13 season, it was announced that Stockport County had renamed the Hardcastle Road Stand (commonly known as the Main Stand) of Edgeley Park "The Danny Bergara Stand", in addition to this the club also fly the Uruguayan flag during every home game, above the Railway End.

In June 2021, the Stockport County Supporters Co-operative and Help the Hatters launched a fundraising campaign to commission a bronze statue of Danny Bergara. Award-winning, Sussex based sculptor, Hannah Stewart was chosen. On 8 May 2023 the statue was unveiled by the Uruguayan ambassador to the UK, Mr Cesar Rodriguez Zavalla, the statue now proudly stands located outside the Cheadle End at Edgeley Park.

== Honours ==
=== As a manager ===
Stockport County

- Associate Members' Cup / Football League Trophy runner-up: 1991–92, 1992–93
