= Keith Parkinson (footballer) =

English footballer (born 1956)

Personal information
- Full name: Keith James Parkinson
- Date of birth: 28 January 1956 (age 70)
- Place of birth: Preston, England
- Height: 6 ft 1 in (1.85 m)
- Position: Centre-back

Youth career
- –1976: Leeds United

Senior career*
| Years | Team | Apps | (Gls) |
| 1976–1982 | Leeds United | 31 | (0) |
| 1981 | → Hull City (loan) | 1 | (0) |
| 1982 | Doncaster Rovers | 5 | (0) |
| Total | | 37 | (0) |
- * Club domestic league appearances and goals

Keith James Parkinson (born 28 January 1956) is an English former professional footballer who played as a centre-back. He played in the Football League for Leeds United, Hull City and Doncaster Rovers.
