= Neil Firm =

English footballer

Personal information
- Full name: Neil John Firm
- Date of birth: 23 January 1958 (age 68)
- Place of birth: Bradford, England
- Height: 6 ft 3 in (1.91 m)
- Position: Centre-back

Youth career
- –1980: Leeds United

Senior career*
Years	Team	Apps	(Gls)
1980–1982	Leeds United	12	(0)
1982	→ Oldham Athletic (loan)	9	(0)
1982–1986	Peterborough United	72	(3)
- Ramsey Town
- Diss Town
Total		93	(3)
- * Club domestic league appearances and goals

Neil John Firm (born 23 January 1958) is an English former professional footballer who played as a centre-back. He played in the Football League for Leeds United, Oldham Athletic and Peterborough United, and played non-league football for Ramsey Town and Diss Town.

== Career ==
Firm was born in Bradford, and signed his first professional contract with Leeds United in January 1976. He made his first team debut in an away match to Manchester City in February 1980, and joined Oldham Athletic on loan in March 1982, for whom he made 9 appearances. He made 12 league appearances in total for Leeds United.

In the summer of 1982, he joined Peterborough United for a fee of £15,000, linking up with manager Martin Wilkinson, who was assistant manager at Leeds United while Firm played there. He was a regular player there, and made 72 league appearances, scoring three goals, but retired from professional in January 1986 due to a prolonged knee injury.

He subsequently played non-league football for Ramsey Town and Diss Town.

== Personal life ==
Firm moved to Norfolk in 1986 and ran a pub in Billingford, near Diss. He joined Norfolk Constabulary in 1988, and worked as a Police Constable in Thetford before being promoted to a detective chief inspector.
