= 1992–93 Football League Trophy =

Autoglass Trophy

Tournament details
- Country: England; Wales

The 1992–93 Football League Trophy, known as the 1992–93 Autoglass Trophy for sponsorship reasons, was the twelfth staging of the Football League Trophy, a knock-out competition for English football clubs in the Second and Third Divisions (now known as League One and Two).

The winners were Port Vale, who defeated Stockport County 2–1 in the final.

The competition began on 1 December 1992 and ended with the final on 22 May 1993.

The tournament begins with clubs divided into a Northern and a Southern section, and teams entering a group stage. Each section then gradually eliminates the qualifying teams in knock-out fashion until each has a winning finalist. At this point, the two winning finalists face each other in the combined final for the honour of the trophy.

== First round ==
=== Northern Section ===
Burnley and Darlington received byes.

Group 1
| Team | Pld | W | D | L | GF | GA | GD | Pts |
|---|---|---|---|---|---|---|---|---|
| Hull City | 2 | 1 | 1 | 0 | 3 | 1 | +2 | 4 |
| Doncaster Rovers | 2 | 1 | 0 | 1 | 3 | 4 | −1 | 3 |
| York City | 2 | 0 | 1 | 1 | 1 | 2 | −1 | 1 |

| Date | Team 1 | Score | Team 2 |
|---|---|---|---|
| 1 Dec | Doncaster Rovers | 2–1 | York City |
| 8 Dec | York City | 0–0 | Hull City |
| 15 Dec | Hull City | 3–1 | Doncaster Rovers |

Group 2
| Team | Pld | W | D | L | GF | GA | GD | Pts |
|---|---|---|---|---|---|---|---|---|
| Huddersfield Town | 2 | 1 | 1 | 0 | 5 | 0 | +5 | 4 |
| Bradford City | 2 | 1 | 1 | 0 | 4 | 0 | +4 | 4 |
| Halifax Town | 2 | 0 | 0 | 2 | 0 | 9 | −9 | 0 |

| Date | Team 1 | Score | Team 2 |
|---|---|---|---|
| 1 Dec | Halifax Town | 0–4 | Bradford City |
| 9 Dec | Bradford City | 0–0 | Huddersfield Town |
| 15 Dec | Huddersfield Town | 5–0 | Halifax Town |

Group 3
| Team | Pld | W | D | L | GF | GA | GD | Pts |
|---|---|---|---|---|---|---|---|---|
| Rotherham United | 2 | 2 | 0 | 0 | 4 | 1 | +3 | 6 |
| Scunthorpe United | 2 | 0 | 1 | 1 | 3 | 5 | −2 | 1 |
| Lincoln City | 2 | 0 | 1 | 1 | 2 | 3 | −1 | 1 |

| Date | Team 1 | Score | Team 2 |
|---|---|---|---|
| 1 Dec | Lincoln City | 0–1 | Rotherham United |
| 8 Dec | Rotherham United | 3–1 | Scunthorpe United |
| 14 Dec | Scunthorpe United | 2–2 | Lincoln City |

Group 4
| Team | Pld | W | D | L | GF | GA | GD | Pts |
|---|---|---|---|---|---|---|---|---|
| Blackpool | 2 | 1 | 1 | 0 | 4 | 3 | +1 | 4 |
| Wigan Athletic | 2 | 1 | 0 | 1 | 4 | 4 | 0 | 3 |
| Preston North End | 2 | 0 | 1 | 1 | 2 | 3 | −1 | 1 |

| Date | Team 1 | Score | Team 2 |
|---|---|---|---|
| 1 Dec | Preston North End | 1–1 | Blackpool |
| 8 Dec | Blackpool | 3–2 | Wigan Athletic |
| 6 Jan | Wigan Athletic | 2–1 | Preston North End |

Group 5
| Team | Pld | W | D | L | GF | GA | GD | Pts |
|---|---|---|---|---|---|---|---|---|
| Rochdale | 2 | 1 | 1 | 0 | 2 | 1 | +1 | 4 |
| Bolton Wanderers | 2 | 0 | 2 | 0 | 1 | 1 | 0 | 2 |
| Bury | 2 | 0 | 1 | 1 | 2 | 3 | −1 | 1 |

| Date | Team 1 | Score | Team 2 |
|---|---|---|---|
| 1 Dec | Rochdale | 0–0 | Bolton Wanderers |
| 8 Dec | Bolton Wanderers | 1–1 | Bury |
| 12 Jan | Bury | 1–2 | Rochdale |

Group 6
| Team | Pld | W | D | L | GF | GA | GD | Pts |
|---|---|---|---|---|---|---|---|---|
| Stockport County | 2 | 2 | 0 | 0 | 5 | 0 | +5 | 6 |
| Chesterfield | 2 | 1 | 0 | 1 | 1 | 3 | −2 | 3 |
| Chester City | 2 | 0 | 0 | 2 | 0 | 3 | −3 | 0 |

| Date | Team 1 | Score | Team 2 |
|---|---|---|---|
| 5 Dec | Chester City | 0–1 | Chesterfield |
| 8 Dec | Chesterfield | 0–3 | Stockport County |
| 15 Dec | Stockport County | 2–0 | Chester City |

Group 7
| Team | Pld | W | D | L | GF | GA | GD | Pts |
|---|---|---|---|---|---|---|---|---|
| Scarborough | 2 | 1 | 0 | 1 | 5 | 4 | +1 | 3 |
| Hartlepool United | 2 | 1 | 0 | 1 | 4 | 3 | +1 | 3 |
| Carlisle United | 2 | 1 | 0 | 1 | 2 | 4 | −2 | 3 |

| Date | Team 1 | Score | Team 2 |
|---|---|---|---|
| 5 Dec | Scarborough | 4–0 | Carlisle United |
| 8 Dec | Hartlepool United | 4–1 | Scarborough |
| 15 Dec | Carlisle United | 2–0 | Hartlepool United |

=== Southern Section ===
Port Vale and Swansea City received byes.

Group 1
| Team | Pld | W | D | L | GF | GA | GD | Pts |
|---|---|---|---|---|---|---|---|---|
| Northampton Town | 2 | 2 | 0 | 0 | 4 | 2 | +2 | 6 |
| Barnet | 2 | 1 | 0 | 1 | 5 | 4 | +1 | 3 |
| Colchester United | 2 | 0 | 0 | 2 | 3 | 6 | −3 | 0 |

| Date | Team 1 | Score | Team 2 |
|---|---|---|---|
| 1 Dec | Colchester United | 1–2 | Northampton Town |
| 9 Dec | Northampton Town | 2–1 | Barnet |
| 21 Dec | Barnet | 4–2 | Colchester United |

Group 2
| Team | Pld | W | D | L | GF | GA | GD | Pts |
|---|---|---|---|---|---|---|---|---|
| Leyton Orient | 2 | 1 | 1 | 0 | 6 | 3 | +3 | 4 |
| Fulham | 2 | 0 | 2 | 0 | 5 | 5 | 0 | 2 |
| Gillingham | 2 | 0 | 1 | 1 | 4 | 7 | −3 | 1 |

| Date | Team 1 | Score | Team 2 |
|---|---|---|---|
| 1 Dec | Leyton Orient | 4–1 | Gillingham |
| 8 Dec | Gillingham | 3–3 | Fulham |
| 15 Dec | Fulham | 2–2 | Leyton Orient |

Group 3
| Team | Pld | W | D | L | GF | GA | GD | Pts |
|---|---|---|---|---|---|---|---|---|
| Brighton | 2 | 1 | 1 | 0 | 4 | 3 | +1 | 4 |
| Reading | 2 | 0 | 2 | 0 | 2 | 2 | 0 | 2 |
| AFC Bournemouth | 2 | 0 | 1 | 1 | 3 | 4 | −1 | 1 |

| Date | Team 1 | Score | Team 2 |
|---|---|---|---|
| 1 Dec | Reading | 1–1 | Brighton & Hove Albion |
| 9 Dec | Brighton & Hove Albion | 3–2 | AFC Bournemouth |
| 5 Jan | AFC Bournemouth | 1–1 | Reading |

Group 4
| Team | Pld | W | D | L | GF | GA | GD | Pts |
|---|---|---|---|---|---|---|---|---|
| Cardiff City | 2 | 2 | 0 | 0 | 6 | 3 | +3 | 6 |
| Hereford United | 2 | 1 | 0 | 1 | 4 | 4 | 0 | 3 |
| Shrewsbury Town | 2 | 0 | 0 | 2 | 2 | 5 | −3 | 0 |

| Date | Team 1 | Score | Team 2 |
|---|---|---|---|
| 1 Dec | Shrewsbury Town | 1–3 | Cardiff City |
| 8 Dec | Cardiff City | 3–2 | Hereford United |
| 22 Dec | Hereford United | 2–1 | Shrewsbury Town |

Group 5
| Team | Pld | W | D | L | GF | GA | GD | Pts |
|---|---|---|---|---|---|---|---|---|
| Exeter City | 2 | 1 | 1 | 0 | 6 | 1 | +5 | 4 |
| Torquay United | 2 | 1 | 0 | 1 | 2 | 6 | −4 | 3 |
| Plymouth Argyle | 2 | 0 | 1 | 1 | 2 | 3 | −1 | 1 |

| Date | Team 1 | Score | Team 2 |
|---|---|---|---|
| 8 Dec | Exeter City | 5–0 | Torquay United |
| 5 Jan | Plymouth Argyle | 1–1 | Exeter City |
| 2 Feb | Torquay United | 2–1 | Plymouth Argyle |

Group 6
| Team | Pld | W | D | L | GF | GA | GD | Pts |
|---|---|---|---|---|---|---|---|---|
| West Brom | 2 | 2 | 0 | 0 | 5 | 0 | +5 | 6 |
| Walsall | 2 | 1 | 0 | 1 | 2 | 4 | −2 | 3 |
| Mansfield Town | 2 | 0 | 0 | 2 | 0 | 3 | −3 | 0 |

| Date | Team 1 | Score | Team 2 |
|---|---|---|---|
| 1 Dec | Walsall | 2–0 | Mansfield Town |
| 5 Jan | West Bromwich Albion | 4–0 | Walsall |
| 12 Jan | Mansfield Town | 0–1 | West Bromwich Albion |

Group 7
| Team | Pld | W | D | L | GF | GA | GD | Pts |
|---|---|---|---|---|---|---|---|---|
| Stoke City | 2 | 1 | 1 | 0 | 4 | 2 | +2 | 4 |
| Wrexham | 2 | 1 | 0 | 1 | 3 | 2 | +1 | 3 |
| Crewe Alexandra | 2 | 0 | 1 | 1 | 2 | 5 | −3 | 1 |

| Date | Team 1 | Score | Team 2 |
|---|---|---|---|
| 8 Dec | Crewe Alexandra | 0–3 | Wrexham |
| 15 Dec | Wrexham | 0–2 | Stoke City |
| 6 Jan | Stoke City | 2–2 | Crewe Alexandra |

== Second round ==
=== Northern Section ===
| Date | Home team | Score | Away team |
|---|---|---|---|
| 12 Jan | Hull City | 0 – 1 | Chesterfield |
| 12 Jan | Scarborough | 3 – 4 | Bradford City |
| 12 Jan | Stockport County | 1 – 0 | Hartlepool United |
| 19 Jan | Blackpool | 1 – 3 | Burnley |
| 18 Jan | Darlington | 3 – 4 | Bolton Wanderers |
| 18 Jan | Rochdale | 0 – 0 | Scunthorpe United |
Abandoned after 87 minutes
| 18 Jan | Rotherham United | 3 – 3 | Wigan Athletic |
Wigan won 5–4 on penalties
| 20 Jan | Huddersfield Town | 3 – 0 | Doncaster Rovers |
| 2 Feb | Rochdale | 1 – 2 | Scunthorpe United |

=== Southern Section ===
| Date | Home team | Score | Away team |
|---|---|---|---|
| 12 Jan | Leyton Orient | 4 – 1 | Wrexham |
| 12 Jan | Port Vale | 4 – 3 | Fulham |
| 18 Jan | Brighton & Hove Albion | 4 – 2 | Walsall |
| 18 Jan | Cardiff City | 1 – 2 | Swansea City |
| 18 Jan | Northampton Town | 4 – 0 | Hereford United |
| 20 Jan | Stoke City | 4 – 1 | Barnet |
| 9 Feb | Exeter City | 2 – 2 | Reading |
Exeter won 4–2 on penalties
| 9 Feb | West Bromwich Albion | 2 – 1 | Torquay United |

== Area quarter-finals ==
=== Northern Section ===
| Date | Home team | Score | Away team |
|---|---|---|---|
| 2 Feb | Bradford City | 3 – 4 | Stockport County |
| 2 Feb | Chesterfield | 3 – 0 | Burnley |
| 2 Feb | Huddersfield Town | 3 – 0 | Bolton Wanderers |
| 9 Feb | Wigan Athletic | 2 – 1 | Scunthorpe United |

=== Southern Section ===
| Date | Home team | Score | Away team |
|---|---|---|---|
| 2 Feb | Port Vale | 4 – 2 | Northampton Town |
| 16 Feb | Stoke City | 2 – 1 | West Bromwich Albion |
| 16 Feb | Swansea City | 1 – 0 | Leyton Orient |
| 17 Feb | Brighton & Hove Albion | 0 – 1 | Exeter City |

== Area semi-finals ==
=== Northern Section ===
| Date | Home team | Score | Away team |
|---|---|---|---|
| 23 Feb | Stockport County | 2 – 1 | Chesterfield |
| 23 Feb | Wigan Athletic | 5 – 2 | Huddersfield Town |

=== Southern Section ===
| Date | Home team | Score | Away team |
|---|---|---|---|
| 23 Feb | Swansea City | 2 – 3 | Exeter City |
| 3 Mar | Stoke City | 0 – 1 | Port Vale |

== Area finals ==
=== Northern Area final ===
1993-03-16

| Wigan Athletic | 2 – 1 | Stockport County |

Springfield Park, Wigan
Attendance: 4,136

1993-04-20

| Stockport County | 2 – 0 | Wigan Athletic |

Edgeley Park, Stockport
Attendance: 6,315

=== Southern Area final ===
1993-03-16

| Port Vale | 2 – 1 | Exeter City |

Vale Park, Stoke-on-Trent
Attendance: 8,866

1993-04-20
7,060

| Exeter City | 1 – 1 | Port Vale |

St James Park, Exeter
Attendance: 7,060

== Final ==
1993-05-22
15:00 BST

| Port Vale | 2 – 1 | Stockport County |
|---|---|---|
| Kerr 4'; Slaven 37' | | Francis 66' |

Wembley Stadium, London
Attendance: 35,885
