= 1989 Football League Third Division play-off final =

Association football match

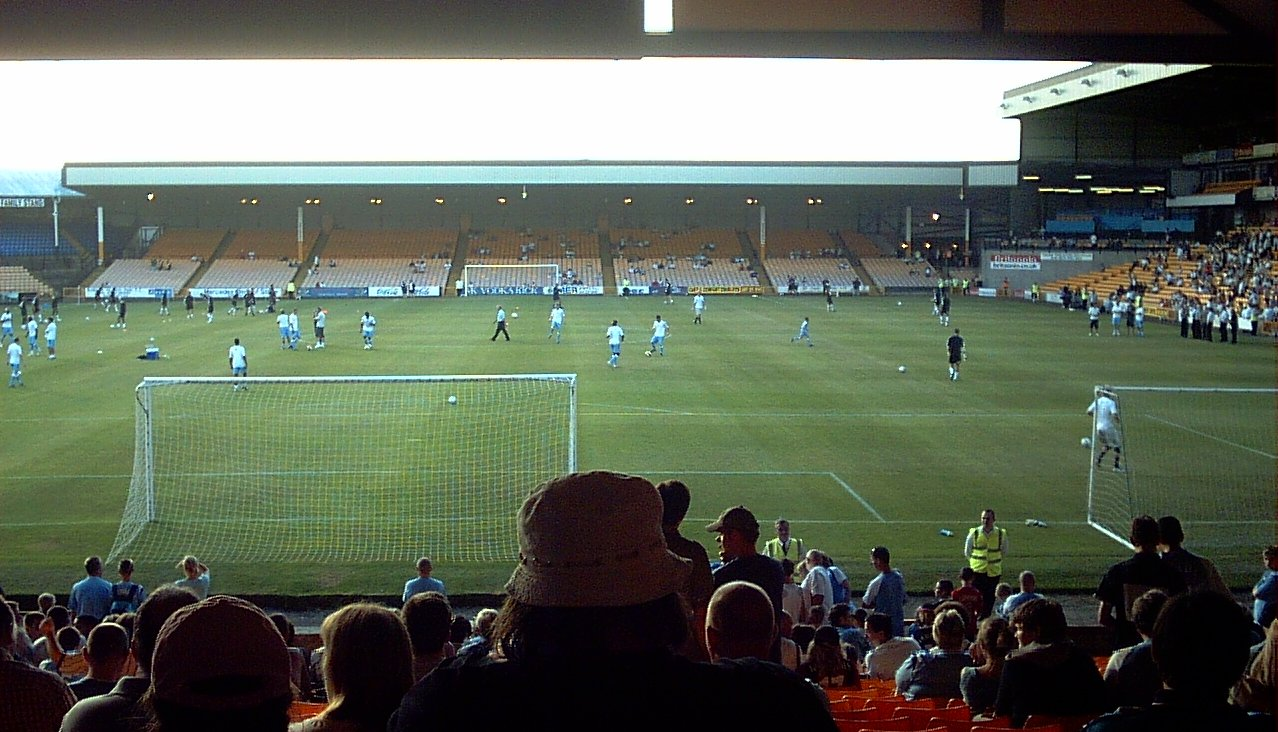
- Vale Park pictured in July 2006
Bristol Rovers	Port Vale
1	2
- on aggregate

First leg
Bristol Rovers	Port Vale
1	1
- Date: 31 May 1989
- Venue: Twerton Park, Bath
- Referee: Allan Gunn (Sussex)
- Attendance: 9,042

Second leg
Port Vale	Bristol Rovers
1	0
- Date: 3 June 1989
- Venue: Vale Park, Stoke-on-Trent
- Referee: Keith Hackett (Sheffield & Hallamshire)
- Attendance: 17,343

The 1989 Football League Third Division play-off final was a two-legged football match played on 31 May and 3 June 1989, between Port Vale and Bristol Rovers to determine the third and final team to gain promotion from the Third Division to the Second Division. The top two teams of the 1988–89 Football League Third Division season gained automatic promotion to the Second Division, while those placed from third to sixth place in the table took part in play-offs; the winners of these semi-finals competed for the final place for the 1989–90 season in the Second Division. From 1990 onwards, play-off finals would be one-legged affairs decided at Wembley Stadium or an appropriate neutral stadium.

It was the first time either Port Vale or Bristol Rovers played a play-off final, with play-offs only being introduced to English football for the first time two years previously. In the semi-finals, Port Vale defeated Preston North End, and Bristol Rovers beat Fulham. The first leg of the final finished 1–1, with Port Vale midfielder Robbie Earle equalising in the 73rd minute after Gary Penrice had given Bristol Rovers the lead in the first half. In the second leg, Earle scored the only goal of the match with a 52nd minute header. The result meant that Port Vale won the play-offs with a 2–1 aggregate victory.

Port Vale ended the following season eleventh in the Second Division, 13 points outside the play-offs and 13 points above the relegation zone. Bristol Rovers secured promotion as champions of the Third Division, finishing two points ahead of Bristol City in second and six points ahead of third-placed Notts County.

== Route to the final ==
Football League Third Division final table, leading positions
Pos	Team	Pld	W	D	L	GF	GA	GD	Pts
1	Wolverhampton Wanderers	46	26	14	6	96	49	+47	92
2	Sheffield United	46	25	9	12	93	54	+39	84
3	Port Vale	46	24	12	10	78	48	+30	84
4	Fulham	46	22	9	15	69	67	+2	75
5	Bristol Rovers	46	19	17	10	67	51	+16	74
6	Preston North End	46	19	15	12	79	60	+19	72

The 1988–89 season saw Wolverhampton Wanderers, Sheffield United and Port Vale vie for the two automatic promotion places in the Third Division, the third tier of the English football league system, and it was Port Vale who missed out and finished in third-place, two places ahead of Bristol Rovers in fifth. Both therefore took part in the play-offs to determine the third promoted team. Port Vale had finished level on points with second-place Sheffield United, but their inferior goal difference cost them automatic promotion. Bristol Rovers finished fifth, ten points behind Port Vale.

Port Vale's opponents for the play-off semi-final were Preston North End, managed by John Rudge's predecessor John McGrath, and the first leg was played on the plastic pitch at Deepdale in Preston on 22 May. Port Vale sold their 3,500 allocation for the game in three days. Preston's Nigel Jemson put the home side in front on 16 minutes, before Robbie Earle levelled the score at 1–1 after a John Jeffers cross was flicked on by Darren Beckford. There was a pitch invasion by the Preston fans after a fire erupted under the wooden slats of their stands. Joan Walley, Member of parliament (MP) for the Stoke-on-Trent North constituency, called for an enquiry at Parliament, but none was made. The return leg was held at Vale Park three days later. Beckford opened the scoring on 11 minutes after latching on to a Ron Futcher flick on, only for Mark Patterson to again level the tie just two minutes later. Futcher had the chance to take the lead with a penalty, only to hit the bar, before Beckford scored two goals in quick succession to claim a hat-trick and secure a 4–2 aggregate victory.

Bristol Rovers faced Fulham in their semi-final play-off on 21 May, and the first leg was played at Twerton Park, Bath, where Bristol Rovers had played their home matches since being forced to leave Eastville Stadium in 1986. Bristol Rovers claimed a 1–0 win with a goal from Gary Penrice. The second leg was played three days later at Craven Cottage, London. Bristol Rovers claimed a comfortable victory, winning 4–0 away with goals from Billy Clark, Ian Holloway, Dennis Bailey and Andy Reece.

Bristol Rovers			Round	Port Vale
Opponent	Result	Legs	Semi-finals	Opponent	Result	Legs
Fulham	5–0	1–0 home; 4–0 away		Preston North End	4–2	1–1 away; 3–1 home

== Match ==
=== Background ===
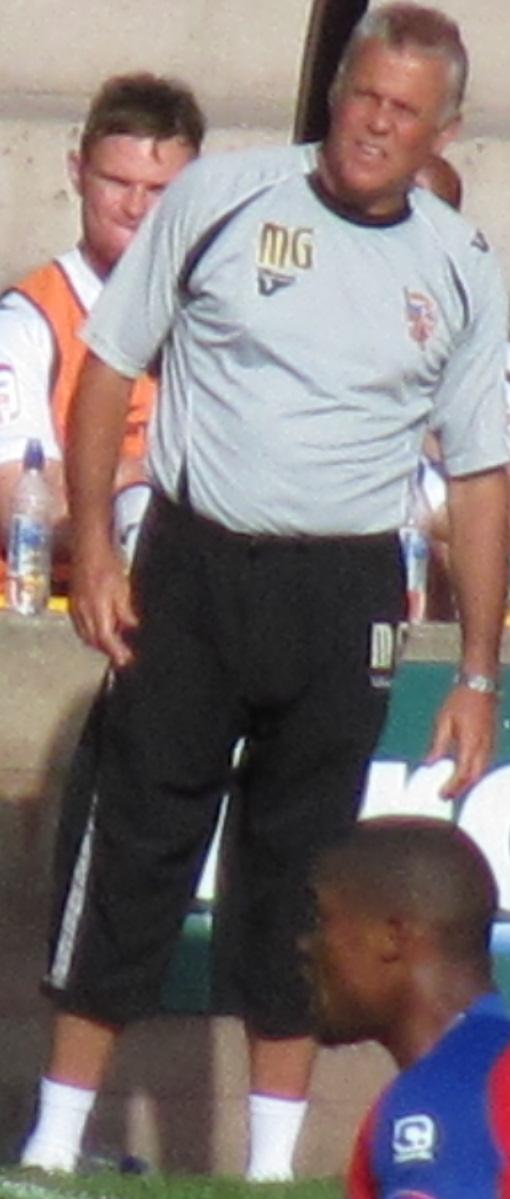
Port Vale goalkeeper Mark Grew conceded only one goal in the final.

It was the first time Port Vale or Bristol Rovers played a play-off final. Port Vale had previously posted two mid-table finishes following their promotion into the third tier in 1986. Bristol Rovers meanwhile had spent most of the decade in the third tier following relegation from the second tier in 1981. In the two league matches played between the clubs during the regular season, the two teams played out a 2–2 draw at Twerton Park in April before Vale won the home fixture 1–0 in the campaign's penultimate game. Port Vale had conceded fewer goals than any other team in the Third Division in the 1988–89 season. No team in the Football League had picked up as many home league draws as Bristol Rovers, with 11, whereas only the bottom two clubs of the Third Division had won fewer home fixtures. Port Vale quickly sold out their 1,500 ticket allocation at Twerton Park, whilst 4,000 Bristol Rovers fans secured tickets at Vale Park. Simon Mills had to postpone his honeymoon to play in the final. The second leg would be the first time Port Vale would play a competitive fixture in June. Port Vale were strong favourites, with The Guardian's David Foot reporting that financially limited Bristol Rovers had made it to the play-offs "against every apparent law of logic" as manager Gerry Francis had built a squad with a transfer budget of £20,000, half of which he had lent the club himself in order to sign Ian Holloway.

=== Summary ===
==== First leg ====
The referee for the first leg was Allan Gunn from Sussex. The Port Vale starting line-up were largely the same eleven that defeated Preston, but with Gary West starting in place of Alan Webb. Bristol Rovers were reported to have reserve players Paul Nixon and Willmott on stand-by as Devon White, Phil Purnell and leading scorer Gary Penrice faced late fitness tests, though all three would start the game. Francis was unable to name Geoff Twentyman, who was suspended, whilst loanees Bailey and Ian Hazel both returned to their parent clubs. Francis stated that "we are going to give it a real go. We are not letting up now".

Jeffers missed a good chance to open the scoring in the 30th minute following a Beckford flick-on from a corner kick. It was Bristol Rovers that were the first to score; keeper Nigel Martyn hit the ball upfield and Penrice volleyed the ball into the net over a stranded Mark Grew following a White flick-on. Futcher headed the ball into the net just before half-time only to find his goal disallowed for offside. Port Vale dominated the second half and it was Earle who equalised 17 minutes from time to level the tie, scoring a headed goal from a Futcher cross. Port Vale nearly won the match in the dying moments, only for Beckford's header to be cleared off the goal-line. Bristol Rovers manager Francis bemoaned Futcher being yellow-carded for an altercation with Ian Alexander when he believed a red was more appropriate, saying "It was an out and out nut!" In his match report, Nicholas Harling of The Times wrote that "Vale finished the first leg looking by far the more accomplished side".

==== Second leg ====
The referee for the second leg was 1981 FA Cup final referee and Sheffield & Hallamshire County Football Association representative Keith Hackett. Port Vale manager John Rudge announced an unchanged team from the eleven that held Bristol Rovers to a 1–1 draw in the first leg. Francis was also able to name the same starting line-up for Bristol Rovers as the 13-man squad all passed fitness tests. The first half finished goalless despite large periods of pressure from Port Vale, with Martyn in good form in the Bristol Rovers goal. Martyn saved a 30 yards (27 m) strike from Dean Glover, whilst Beckford and Earle both came close to taking the lead. The second half saw the "MBE" combination (a Simon Mills corner, flicked on by Beckford and knocked into the net by Earle) pay off, resulting in an Earle headed goal in the 52nd minute; it was his 19th goal of the season and fourth headed goal against Bristol Rovers that season. It was to prove the only goal of the match as Port Vale controlled the remainder of the game, and a celebratory pitch invasion ensued. The Guardian's Stephen Bierley did not enjoy the match and his only praise for Bristol Rovers was that they "did as little as possible to threaten the status quo, winning much praise from everybody by not forcing extra time to extend the tedium". In contrast, The Observer's Derek Wallis reported that "Rovers ... played some delightful football but they were unable to penetrate a resolute defence ... in which West and Glover needed to be constantly alert". With the play-offs still a relatively new concept, both managers and some journalists were highly critical of the idea and agreed that Port Vale had deserved their promotion after finishing the league campaign in third place.

"We practised corners for hours, and it certainly paid off. Millsy could put in a brilliant delivery and as soon as it went toward Becky I knew it was coming my way. At the end of the game it was a huge feeling of relief that we had proved a point – we were good enough for promotion. We knew as a group of players we could play at a higher level and this gave us a chance to do so. I had a great time at Vale, and this was the greatest of them all.

— Earle speaking to The Sentinel in 2009

=== Details ===
==== First leg ====
31 May 1989
19:45 BST

Bristol Rovers	1–1	Port Vale
Penrice 31'		Earle 73'

Twerton Park, Bath
Attendance: 9,042
Referee: Allan Gunn (Sussex)

Bristol Rovers	Port Vale

Bristol Rovers:
GK	1	Nigel Martyn
DF	2	Ian Alexander
DF	3	Billy Clark
DF	4	Steve Yates
FW	5	Devon White
DF	6	Vaughan Jones (c)
MF	7	Ian Holloway	Substituted off
MF	8	David Mehew
MF	9	Andy Reece
FW	10	Gary Penrice
MF	11	Phil Purnell
Substitutes:
FW		Christian McClean	Substituted on
Manager:
Gerry Francis

Port Vale:
GK	1	Mark Grew
DF	2	Simon Mills
DF	3	Darren Hughes
MF	4	Ray Walker
DF	5	Gary West
DF	6	Dean Glover
MF	7	John Jeffers
MF	8	Robbie Earle
FW	9	Ron Futcher (yellow card)
FW	10	Darren Beckford
MF	11	Andy Porter
Substitutes:
FW		Ronnie Jepson
Manager:
John Rudge

==== Second leg ====
3 June 1989
15:00 BST

Port Vale	1–0	Bristol Rovers
Earle 52'

Vale Park, Stoke-on-Trent
Attendance: 17,343
Referee: Keith Hackett (Sheffield & Hallamshire)

Port Vale	Bristol Rovers

Port Vale:
GK	1	Mark Grew
DF	2	Simon Mills
DF	3	Darren Hughes
MF	4	Ray Walker
DF	5	Gary West
DF	6	Dean Glover
MF	7	John Jeffers
MF	8	Robbie Earle
FW	9	Ron Futcher
FW	10	Darren Beckford
MF	11	Andy Porter	Substituted off
Substitutes:
FW	12	Kevin Finney	Substituted on
FW		Ronnie Jepson
Manager:
John Rudge

Bristol Rovers:
GK	1	Nigel Martyn
DF	2	Ian Alexander
DF	3	Billy Clark
DF	4	Steve Yates
FW	5	Devon White
DF	6	Vaughan Jones (c)
MF	7	Ian Holloway
MF	8	David Mehew
MF	9	Andy Reece
FW	10	Gary Penrice
MF	11	Phil Purnell
Substitutes:
FW		Paul Nixon
Manager:
Gerry Francis

== Post-match ==
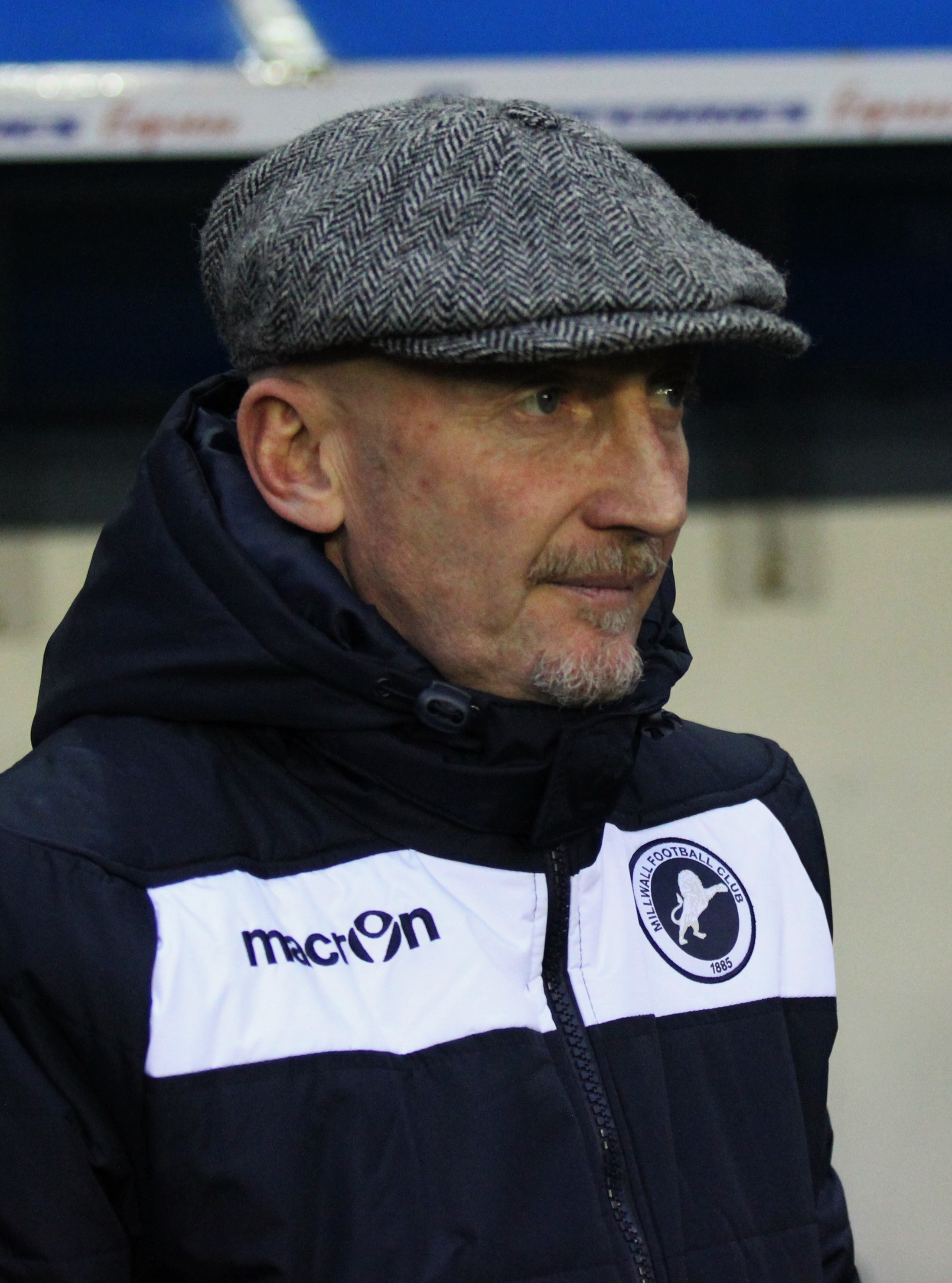
Ian Holloway as Millwall manager in January 2015.

Bristol Rovers recovered from the loss and the following season joined Port Vale in the second tier, coming up as champions. Port Vale remained in the second tier until 1991–92, when they were relegated in last place. Bristol Rovers were themselves relegated at the end of the 1992–93 season. Goalkeeper Martyn went on to win 23 caps for England and spend a long career in the Premier League with Crystal Palace, Leeds United and Everton. Midfielder Holloway went on to manage Bristol Rovers in May 1996, with Gary Penrice as his assistant, in the first job of a long managerial career. Gerry Francis went on to manage Tottenham Hotspur in the Premier League, though would end his management career after a second spell at Bristol Rovers in 2001.

Earle was sold to Wimbledon for £775,000 in July 1991 and later appeared in the 1998 FIFA World Cup for Jamaica. The man that effectively put Port Vale in the final, Beckford, was himself sold to Norwich City for £925,000 in June 1991. Mastermind of the success John Rudge immediately signed a new two-year contract and continued to manage Port Vale until January 1999, when he was dismissed in a controversial decision by chairman Bill Bell.
