= Jacob Mellis =

English association footballer

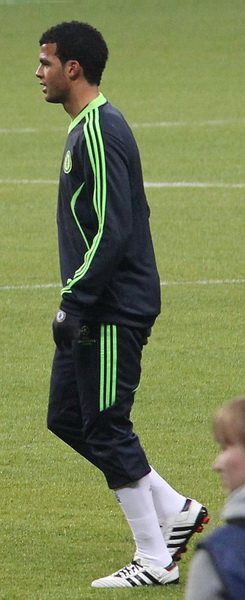
- Mellis warming-up for Chelsea in 2010

Personal information
- Full name: Jacob Alexander Mellis
- Date of birth: 8 January 1991 (age 35)
- Place of birth: Nottingham, England
- Height: 1.81 m (5 ft 11 in)
- Position: Midfielder

Youth career
- 2002–2007: Sheffield United
- 2007–2009: Chelsea

Senior career*
Years	Team	Apps	(Gls)
2009–2012	Chelsea	0	(0)
2009–2010	→ Southampton (loan)	12	(0)
2011	→ Barnsley (loan)	15	(2)
2012–2014	Barnsley	66	(8)
2014–2015	Blackpool	13	(0)
2015	→ Oldham Athletic (loan)	7	(0)
2015–2017	Bury	58	(3)
2017–2020	Mansfield Town	84	(4)
2020	Bolton Wanderers	6	(0)
2020–2021	Gillingham	8	(1)
2021–2022	Southend United	3	(0)
2022	Leatherhead	2	(0)
Total		274	(18)

International career
2006–2007	England U16	6	(0)
2007–2008	England U17	3	(1)
2009–2010	England U19	12	(4)
- * Club domestic league appearances and goals

Jacob Alexander Mellis (born 8 January 1991) is an English former professional footballer.

He transferred from Sheffield United to Chelsea at the age of 16 for a £1 million fee, but made only one substitute appearance before being dismissed for misconduct in March 2012. He spent most of the rest of his career in the English Football League, making 94 Championship appearances for Barnsley and Blackpool and scoring eight goals.

== Club career ==
=== Chelsea ===
Mellis was born in Nottingham and started his career as a trainee with Sheffield United, before joining Premier League club Chelsea for £1 million in June 2007. He was a member of the Chelsea team that reached the final of the FA Youth Cup under manager Paul Clement in 2008, but was sent-off in the 90th minute of the second leg, as Chelsea lost 4–2 on aggregate to Manchester City. In the 2008–09 season, he became a regular in Chelsea's reserves making 13 appearances with three goals.

In August 2009, he joined Southampton on loan and made his Saints debut a day after signing, as a substitute in a 3–1 defeat at Huddersfield Town. He returned to Chelsea in January 2010 but did not make a senior appearance until 23 November that year, in what would be his only Chelsea first team game, coming on in added time as a substitute for Josh McEachran against MŠK Žilina in the UEFA Champions League group stage, a 2–1 home win.

The following January, Mellis signed for Barnsley on a five-month loan. Mellis made his Barnsley debut the next day, in a 2–0 win over Preston North End. He scored his first Barnsley goal in a next game on 5 February 2011 in a 4–1 defeat to Leicester City, which he scored in the next game seven days later against Ipswich Town. Mellis went on to make fifteen appearances and scoring two times.

In March 2012, Mellis was sacked by Chelsea after he admitted setting off a smoke grenade and causing a full-scale evacuation at the club's Cobham Training Centre. Mellis's teammate Billy Clifford escaped with a fine after admitting he brought the grenade – understood to be from a paintball expedition – into Chelsea's Cobham training headquarters. Following his release by Chelsea, Mellis went on trial at Queens Park Rangers. Manager Mark Hughes was impressed with his performance and was keen to extend his trial at the club.

=== Barnsley ===
On 18 June 2012, Mellis agreed a two-year deal with Championship side Barnsley. During a pre-season friendly against Rotherham United, on 21 July 2012, Mellis scored the first goal in the New York Stadium since its opening on 12 March 2012.

Mellis made his Barnsley debut since joining the club permanently, where he set up a goal for John Stones, in the first round of League Cup, and played 120 minutes in a 4–3 win over Rochdale. Seven days later, Mellis made his league debut in the opening game of the season, in a 1–0 win over Middlesbrough. Mellis scored his first goal for Barnsley during a 1–0 win over Bristol City on 1 September 2012, followed scoring his second goal three weeks later on 18 September 2012, in a 2–1 loss against Blackburn Rovers. The following game against Birmingham City on 22 September 2012, Mellis provided a hat-trick assist, in a 5–0 win. Two months later on 24 November 2012, Mellis' fourth goal came in a 2–1 win over Cardiff City. Soon after, Mellis suffered a dead leg that kept him out for month. After a month on the sidelines, Mellis made his first team return, where he came on as a substitute for Jim O'Brien, in a 2–0 win over Leeds United on 12 January 2013. Following his return, Mellis went on to score three more goals against Wolves, Sheffield Wednesday and Hull City (which later awarded 2012–13 Goal of the Season award). After helping the club remain in the Championship, Mellis finished his first full season at Barnsley, scoring six goals in thirty-six appearances.

In the 2013–14 season, Mellis continued to be in the first team, though he suffered injuries. Mellis scored his first Barnsley goal of the 2013–14 season on 3 December 2013, in a 2–1 win over Brighton & Hove Albion. Twenty-Eight days later on 1 January 2014, Mellis scored the club's first 2014-goal when he scored from a free-kick, in a 1–1 draw against Birmingham City. Then on 1 February 2014, Mellis was sent-off in the last minutes after he "recklessly" jumped in on Wednesday winger Jacques Maghoma, in a 1–0 loss against Sheffield Wednesday. After serving three match ban, Mellis returned to the first team on 22 February 2014, in a 1–0 win over Millwall. Towards the end of the season, Mellis' playing time was soon reduced slightly, due to being on the bench.

Following Barnsley's relegation to League One in 2014, Mellis was offered a new contract at Oakwell, but he turned it down and subsequently left the club.

=== Blackpool ===
On 28 July 2014, Mellis signed a one-year deal with Championship side Blackpool, along with two other players. Three days later, Mellis' medical was passed at Blackpool.

Mellis made his Blackpool debut in the opening game of the season, in a 2–0 loss against Nottingham Forest. However, Mellis suffered an injury during a match against Shrewsbury Town in the League Cup. After a month out, Mellis made his first team return at Blackpool, in a 3–1 loss against Norwich City on 27 September 2014. Once again, Mellis suffered an injury that kept him out for weeks.

With his first team opportunities limited under manager Lee Clark, Mellis went on loan to League One side Oldham Athletic in January 2015. Mellis made his Oldham Athletic debut, coming on as a substitute for Carl Winchester in the 72nd minute, in a 3–2 loss against Gillingham two days later. After spending two months without being used in the first team, Mellis made his Oldham Athletic return, where he came on as a substitute for Joseph Mills in the 77th minute, in a 2–0 loss against Crawley Town on 6 April 2015. Mellis went on to make seven appearances for the club.

At the end of the 2014–15 season, Mellis was released by Blackpool in May 2015. After being released by Blackpool, Mellis was soon linked with a move to Fleetwood Town and Rochdale.

=== Later career ===
Mellis joined League One side Bury on 30 June 2015 on a two-year contract. He made his debut in the opening game of the season on 8 August, coming on as a substitute for Tom Pope in the 55th minute, in a 1–1 draw away to Doncaster Rovers. He scored his first goal for the Shakers on 3 September 2016 in a 4–1 win over Port Vale at Gigg Lane.

On 19 May 2017, Mellis joined League Two club Mansfield Town. In June 2019 he signed a new contract. In August that year, he and teammate Dion Donohue were suspended by the club for "an alleged serious breach of club discipline". Mellis was fined two weeks wages, whilst Donohue was released by the club.

On 31 January 2020, Mellis moved to League One club Bolton Wanderers, signing a contract until the end of the season. On 26 June it was announced he would be one of 14 senior players released when their contracts expired at the end of the month.

Mellis signed a permanent contract at Gillingham on 10 August 2020, becoming their third signing of the summer. He made ten appearances, and scored in a 3–1 home win over Oxford United on 10 October.

On 1 February 2021, Mellis joined League Two side Southend United on a permanent contract until the end of the 2020–21 season, with an option for a further year.

In February 2022, Mellis joined Leatherhead.

On 5 June 2023, he revealed he had recently been forced to retire due to injury.

== International career ==
Mellis has represented England at U16, U17 and U19 level.

== Personal life ==
In April 2012, Mellis was arrested after a fight with his girlfriend at his Cobham, Surrey home. Both parties accepted police cautions for common assault.

In January 2020, Mellis and former Mansfield Town teammate Dion Donohue appeared at Nottingham Crown Court, charged with assault, affray and grievous bodily harm alleged to have been committed in Mansfield the previous 16 August. Donohue pleaded guilty, and Mellis not guilty. The case involving Mellis concluded in November 2020.

He struggled with alcoholism during his career. After retiring, he became homeless.

== Career statistics ==
As of match played 26 February 2022

Club	Season	League			FA Cup		League Cup		Other		Total	
Club	Season	Division	Apps	Goals	Apps	Goals	Apps	Goals	Apps	Goals	Apps	Goals
Chelsea	2009–10	Premier League	0	0	0	0	0	0	0	0	0	0
Chelsea	2010–11	Premier League	0	0	0	0	0	0	1 (Note: Appearance(s) in UEFA Champions League)	0	1	0
Chelsea	2011–12	Premier League	0	0	0	0	0	0	0	0	0	0
Chelsea	Chelsea Total		0	0	0	0	0	0	1	0	1	0
Southampton (loan)	2009–10	League One	12	0	0	0	1	0	2 (Note: Appearance(s) in the EFL Trophy.)	0	15	0
Barnsley (loan)	2010–11	Championship	15	2	0	0	0	0	0	0	15	2
Barnsley	2012–13	Championship	36	6	3	0	2	0	0	0	41	6
Barnsley	2013–14	Championship	30	2	1	0	2	0	0	0	33	2
Barnsley	Barnsley Total		66	8	4	0	4	0	0	0	74	8
Blackpool	2014–15	Championship	13	0	0	0	1	0	0	0	14	0
Blackpool	Blackpool Total		13	0	0	0	1	0	0	0	14	0
Oldham Athletic (loan)	2014–15	League One	7	0	0	0	0	0	0	0	7	0
Bury	2015–16	League One	23	0	2	0	2	0	1	0	28	0
Bury	2016–17	League One	35	3	2	0	1	0	3	0	41	3
Bury	Bury Total		58	3	4	0	3	0	4	0	69	3
Mansfield Town	2017–18	League Two	30	1	3	0	0	0	2	0	35	1
Mansfield Town	2018–19	League Two	41	3	2	0	1	0	4 (Note: Appearance(s) in the EFL Trophy & EFL League Two Play-offs.)	1	48	4
Mansfield Town	2019–20	League Two	13	0	2	0	0	0	4	0	19	0
Mansfield Town	Mansfield Town Total		84	4	7	0	1	0	10	1	102	5
Bolton Wanderers	2019–20	League One	6	0	0	0	0	0	0	0	6	0
Gillingham	2020–21	League One	8	1	0	0	1	0	1	0	10	1
Southend United	2020–21	League Two	3	0	0	0	0	0	0	0	3	0
Leatherhead	2021–22	Isthmian League Premier Division	2	0	0	0	0	0	0	0	2	0
Career total			274	18	15	0	11	0	18	1	318	19
