= Kingstonian F.C. =

English football club, based in South West London

Kingstonian
- Full name: Kingstonian Football Club
- Nickname: The Ks
- Founded: 9 November 1885; 140 years ago
- Ground: Robert Parker Stadium (Stanwell)
- Chairman: Yioryos Vasilaras
- Manager: Vacant
- League: Isthmian League South Central Division
- 2025–26: Isthmian League South Central Division, 13th of 22
- Website: kingstonianfc.com
Home colours	Away colours

Kingstonian Football Club is an English semi-professional football club which used to be based in the Royal Borough of Kingston upon Thames, south west London, which currently plays in the Isthmian League South Central Division.

The club was founded in 1885 by YMCA, named Kingston & Surbiton YMCA, and began competing properly in 1893 in the Surrey Junior Cup. There was a split before the start of the 1908–09 season which damaged the club, the two clubs were named Old Kingstonians and Kingston upon Thames A.F.C. After period of quiet during World War I, the two clubs re-united and joined the Athenian League in 1919, named Kingstonian. In 1929, their application to join the Isthmian League was accepted, and they have competed there to the present day. The club, nicknamed the Ks or the K's, spent three seasons at the highest level of non-league football, 1998–99, 1999–2000 and 2000–01, and have won the FA Trophy twice, in consecutive seasons, in 1999 and 2000.

The club is currently without a home ground, and from 2026 will groundshare with Ashford Town (Surrey). They have twice previously had their own stadium, Richmond Road from 1902 to 1988 and Kingsmeadow from 1989 to 2017. After Kingstonian went into administration in 2001, Kingsmeadow was bought by AFC Wimbledon two years later, who allowed Kingstonian to stay. With AFC Wimbledon looking to move to a new ground, Kingsmeadow was sold to Chelsea in 2016, who stipulated that Kingstonian could not remain there.

== History ==
=== Kingston and Surbiton YMCA ===
Kingstonian was formed in autumn 1885, under the name Kingston & Surbiton YMCA. In the period, rugby was the dominant sport in the town, but YMCA was unable to support a rugby club. This influenced their decision to create a club to play "Football under Association rules". The new club played their first fixture on 28 November 1885 losing 3–1 to Surbiton Hill with home games played at Bushy Park before moving to the Spring grove the following season. Over the two years the club played only friendly matches against other football teams in the region.

=== Saxons F.C. ===
In 1887 the club changed its name to Saxons FC and opened up its membership to players who were not also members of YMCA. The club however maintained its links to YMCA and only allowed YMCA members to serve on the decision making committee. In the Summer of 1888 William Carn, the founder of the club, resigned from YMCA after tensions developed where YMCA were concerned that the organization was becoming more like a sporting club than a religious organization. As non YMCA members were not allowed to serve on the committee this would have meant Carn also resigning his duties with the club. The members decided however to sever links with YMCA which allowed Carn to continue. At the same time the club also moved to a ground in Oil Mill Lane (modern day Villiers Road).

=== Kingston Wanderers F.C. ===
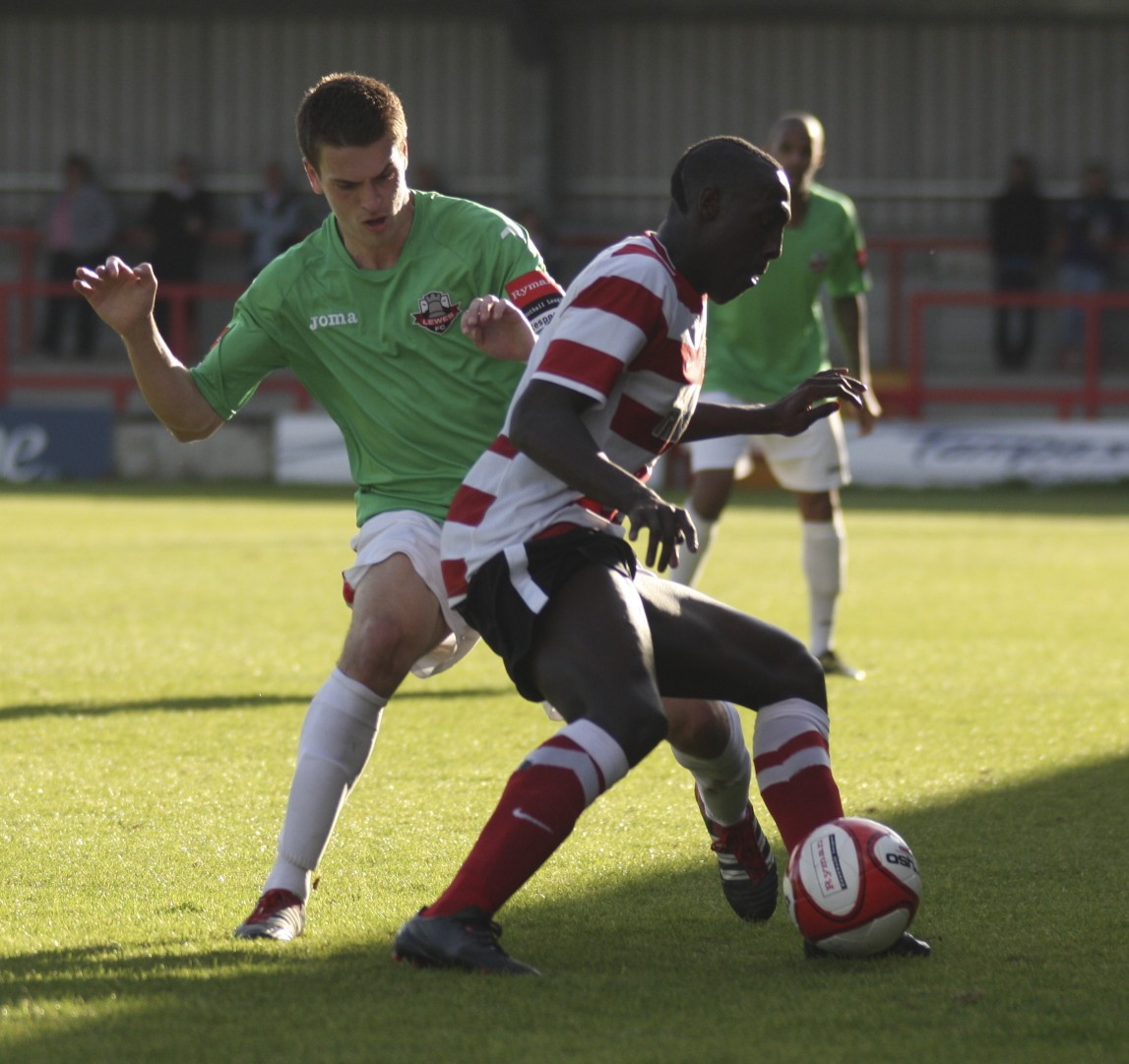
A Kingstonian player in home kit in a 2012 match against Lewes

At the club's annual general meeting in 1890, the secretary at the time, William G. Carn, proposed that the name became "one more identified with the town". His proposal was successful, and the club became Kingston Wanderers F.C. in the 1890–91 season. The club's first season as Kingston Wanderers also heralded a change of home ground to the Fairfield Recreation Ground.

=== Kingston-on-Thames A.F.C. ===
In the Summer of 1893, the association clubs of Kingston considered a proposal to amalgamate and produce one larger club that would represent the whole town. Because many of the clubs had already arranged fixtures for the coming season it was only Kingston Wanderers who moved forward with the plan, although several other clubs were to amalgamate with them in future seasons. On 13 September 1893, the club changed its name to Kingston upon Thames A.F.C. They entered the Surrey Junior Cup affiliated to the Surrey Football Association. The first competitive match in Kingston's history was in November 1893 and resulted in a loss, after a replayed game, to Hampton Court & East Molesey.

When Kingston upon Thames ventured into the Surrey Senior Cup in 1894, the heaviest loss of the club to date was recorded, a 12–0 loss to Weybridge F.C. The club re-entered the Surrey Junior Cup and in 1896 joined the Kingston & District League as founder members. In their first season, they won the league but lost the Surrey Junior Cup 2–1 in the final, to Chertsey F.C. after a replay. They spent two years in the Kingston and District league, coming runners up to Brentford 'A' Team in their second season before moving into the East and West Surrey League at the start of the 1898–1899 season. The club also underwent several ground changes during this period and from 1898 to 1899 season spent 3 years at Dinton Road before one season playing at Lower Marsh Lane in 1901–1902 season. In 1902–1903 they made a final move to Thorpe Road which was virtually on the site of the Richmond Road ground that was to become their home for much of the Twentieth Century. The club continued to compete in the East and West Surrey League and also had a one-season foray into the London League in 1903 alongside the East and West Surrey League but the "experiment" backfired with fixture congestion and selection difficulties caused by having too many games and Kingston upon Thames withdrew from the London League after one season. In 1905–1906 season, the club won the newly renamed West Surrey League, a feat which was replicated in 1906–1907 season. In addition the 1906–1907 season saw them finish runners up in the Surrey Senior Cup which was lost to Clapham F.C. 3–1.

=== Old Kingstonians ===
The newfound success in Surrey amateur football was soon lost when the club split before the start of the 1908–09 season after increasing tensions between the First Team members and the "A" Team members. This reached a head after elections for representation on the committee that ran the club. This resulted in treasurer David Judd forming Old Kingstonians F.C. and taking much of the first team with him to a new ground at Norbiton. Kingston upon Thames continued to compete on the old ground at Thorpe Road, and were made up of the former members of the "A" team as well as two members of the first team who chose to stay. Judd's team became known as the "OKs", the "Rupert's" or the "Juddites" while the Kingston upon Thames team was known as "The Boys" or simply "The Town club". Initially Kingston upon Thames had the upper hand both in league and cup success and in matches between the two clubs. To some extent this justified the belief of the former "A" Team members that they were the better team despite effectively representing the club at a lower Junior level than the first team. It also somewhat justified their opinion that the first team had been holding back progress at the club. Gradually however Old Kingstonians improved, winning the West Surrey League in 1910, followed by the Surrey Senior Cup in both 1911 and 1914 and the Southern Suburban League in the two seasons before the war.

By the start of World War One, Old Kingstonians held a supremacy of the two clubs, and in 1913–1914 won three trophies including the Southern Suburban League and Surrey Senior Cup. The rivalry between these two clubs was intense and to some extent the competition helped both clubs with their standard of football and improvements to facilities. However, there were occasions in which this rivalry spilled over into more serious incidents. Over the period of the split several appeals had been made by both clubs concerning eligibility of players in matches between the two sides, and in two cases the result of the game was overturned. In the 1913–1914 season the Surrey Charity Shield match between the two clubs saw a number of incidents involving players and spectators and this led to the Surrey FA taking responsibility for the running of the replay with warning notices posted at the ground and a large police presence.

An FA enquiry into incidents at the first game led to one of the witnesses being attacked on their return to Kingston after giving evidence. Both teams competed in the West Surrey League in 1908–1909 but in 1909–1910 season Kingston upon Thames FC moved into the Southern Suburban League with Old Kingstonians remaining in the West Surrey League. Kingston upon Thames did however again try a failed "experiment" by re-entering two first teams in both the Southern Suburban League and West Surrey League for the 1910–1911 season but again this resulted in selection problems and was dropped at the end of the season. At the start of the 1911–1912 season Old Kingstonians also moved to the Southern Suburban League where both teams stayed until the outbreak of World War One.

=== World War One ===
At the outbreak of the First World War, Kingston upon Thames FC immediately cancelled all football. However Old Kingstonians did attempt to continue playing despite heavy political pressure to stop. The club had joined the Athenian League and played two games before the league was cancelled. They also played three rounds in the FA Cup qualifying stages before losing to Redhill. They then joined the Metropolitan League which had been set up for wartime football and also played in the London Senior Cup (losing to Walthamstow Grange) and were entered for the FA Amateur Cup. However. despite resisting political pressure, attendances dropped and in December 1914 the club announced that it was ceasing activities.

=== Kingstonian F.C. ===
In 1919 football returned in Kingston. The war had dimmed the rivalry between the teams, and they re-united as Kingstonian F.C. Their first match after unification was on 6 September 1919 competing in the Athenian League against Southall F.C. However, the season was plagued with issues regarding their home ground at Richmond Road and a finish in the bottom half of the league meant the team were forced to apply to re-enter the league. Their application was successful, and heralded a change of fortunes for Kingstonian. Before the 1920–1921 season it seemed they had lost their ground after confusion over their desire to renew the rent. This meant that Leyland Motors had been given exclusive use but an agreement was reached to allow for a groundshare with Leyland Motors, who took over the fixtures of the Kingstonian Reserve team who had signed up for the Southern Suburban League. The following season Kingstonian were successful in purchasing the Richmond Road ground, although the groundshare arrangement with Leyland Motors continued. They had a more successful spell from 1923 up to the outbreak of World War II, winning the league in 1924, and in 1926 with a record number of points. The club progressed to several finals of the London and Surrey Senior Cups.

In 1929, Kingstonian were successful in their application to join the Isthmian League after the withdrawal of Civil Service F.C. In 1933, Kingstonian won the FA Amateur Cup, they won the League in 1934 and 1937, and the club won the Surrey Senior Cup in 1935 and 1939. "Competitive Amateur Football" was called off in September 1939 for World War II and Kingstonian were to play only one game at the start of the 1939/1940 season. Their ground was requisitioned by the Civil Defence for the duration of the war and no further games were played until 1945. Depleted of the majority of their pre-war players, Kingstonian came last in the first league after the war in 1945–1946 season, and had to resort to fundraising to gather money to renovate both the stadium and the changing rooms. In 1949, the all-time top goalscorer Johnny Whing arrived at the club, and was top scorer in nine different seasons for the club. In 1955, Kingstonian's heaviest ever home defeat, 12–3, was recorded at the hands of Bishop Auckland FC in front of the club's record attendance of 8,960.

In the 1959–60 season, the Ks had their first Wembley Stadium appearance in the FA Amateur Cup final, which was lost to Hendon F.C. 2–1. In 1963, Kingstonian won the double; the Surrey and London Senior Cup. The 1970s were a period of decline for the club, and despite becoming professional in 1975, they were relegated to Division One in 1979. In 1985 Kingstonian were once again promoted to the Isthmian League, finishing second. In 1987, 20 years without silverware was ended by the Ks winning the London Senior Cup.

Kingstonian won the Isthmian League in 1998 and the FA Trophy in 1999 and 2000 at Wembley Stadium under manager Geoff Chapple, and then managed to reach the fourth round of the FA Cup in 2001. Entering the competition at the Fourth Qualifying Round, they beat Devizes Town before beating two Football League clubs – Brentford and Southend United, either side of a win over fellow Conference team Southport – on their way to the FA Cup fourth round, where they were drawn with Bristol City before succumbing to a late winner in the replay, losing 1–0.

Relegation and, moreover, financial problems as a result of overspending in the chase for success, saw a sharp downturn in the club's fortunes with the club entering administration to avoid bankruptcy with debts of £800,000 in October 2001. Property developer, Rajesh Khosla, and his family took over the club with a new company Kingstonian F.C. Limited and was assigned the lease in 2002. In 2003 the then manager Kim Harris said that Khosla, was "raping us" after Khosla sold the Kingsmeadow ground for £2 million in personal profit. However, in February 2005 Khosla stepped down as chairman, selling the club to Jimmy Cochrane, whilst making a profit. While this did not save Kingstonian from relegation that year, the 2005–06 season saw Kingstonian Football Club revitalised. They only narrowly missed out on the promotion playoffs and finished their season by beating AFC Wimbledon in the final of the Surrey Senior Cup at Woking's ground 1–0.

Changes continued during mid-2006 with Mark Anderson and Malcolm Winwright taking charge of the club, installing Stuart McIntyre as successor to Ian McDonald in the role of head coach. However, McIntyre's stay in the role was brief and "unsuccessful", with he himself being replaced by Alan Dowson at the start of 2007. Under Dowson the club was promoted back to the Isthmian Premier in 2009. However, after the 2013–14 Isthmian League in which Kingstonian finished second but missed out on promotion, on 11 May 2014 Dowson resigned, being replaced by Tommy Williams.

With former Ks midfielder Tommy Williams installed as manager, the club again reached the FA Cup Third Qualifying Round, losing 3–2 to a last minute goal against Eastbourne Borough. The league campaign saw the club make late challenge for the play-offs falling short in the last couple of weeks of the season. In his second season, the 2015-16 campaign saw the Ks lift their first cup in ten years, winning the Isthmian League Cup with a 5–0 victory over Faversham Town. The 2016–17 season started poorly with the club just outside the relegation zone with six games remaining. Tommy Williams was replaced as manager by former Billericay Town man Craig Edwards. He led the club to a 16th-place finish after a five match unbeaten run to end the season. Ks left the Kingsmeadow Stadium at the end of the season and moved to Fetcham Grove to groundshare with Leatherhead. Edwards resigned in October 2017 and was replaced by former Whyteleafe manager Leigh Dynan.

At the beginning of the 2018–19 season, Kingstonian moved back to the Royal Borough of Kingston upon Thames and started a ground share with Corinthian-Casuals at King George's Field. A difficult season saw Ks have three managers, as Leigh Dynan was replaced by Dean Brennan and then very quickly by stand-in manager Kim Harris - the Ks moved from second place in the table on New Year's Day to escaping relegation by a single place. New manager Hayden Bird joined the club in 2019, only for the 2019–20 season to be curtailed by the COVID-19 pandemic. In that season's FA Cup the Ks reached the first round for the first time since 2000–01, where they defeated Macclesfield Town 4–0 at Moss Rose, before losing 2–0 at home to AFC Fylde in the second round. The 2023–24 season saw Kingstonian relegated from the Premier Division, 15 years after their promotion to that level.

== Colours and badge ==
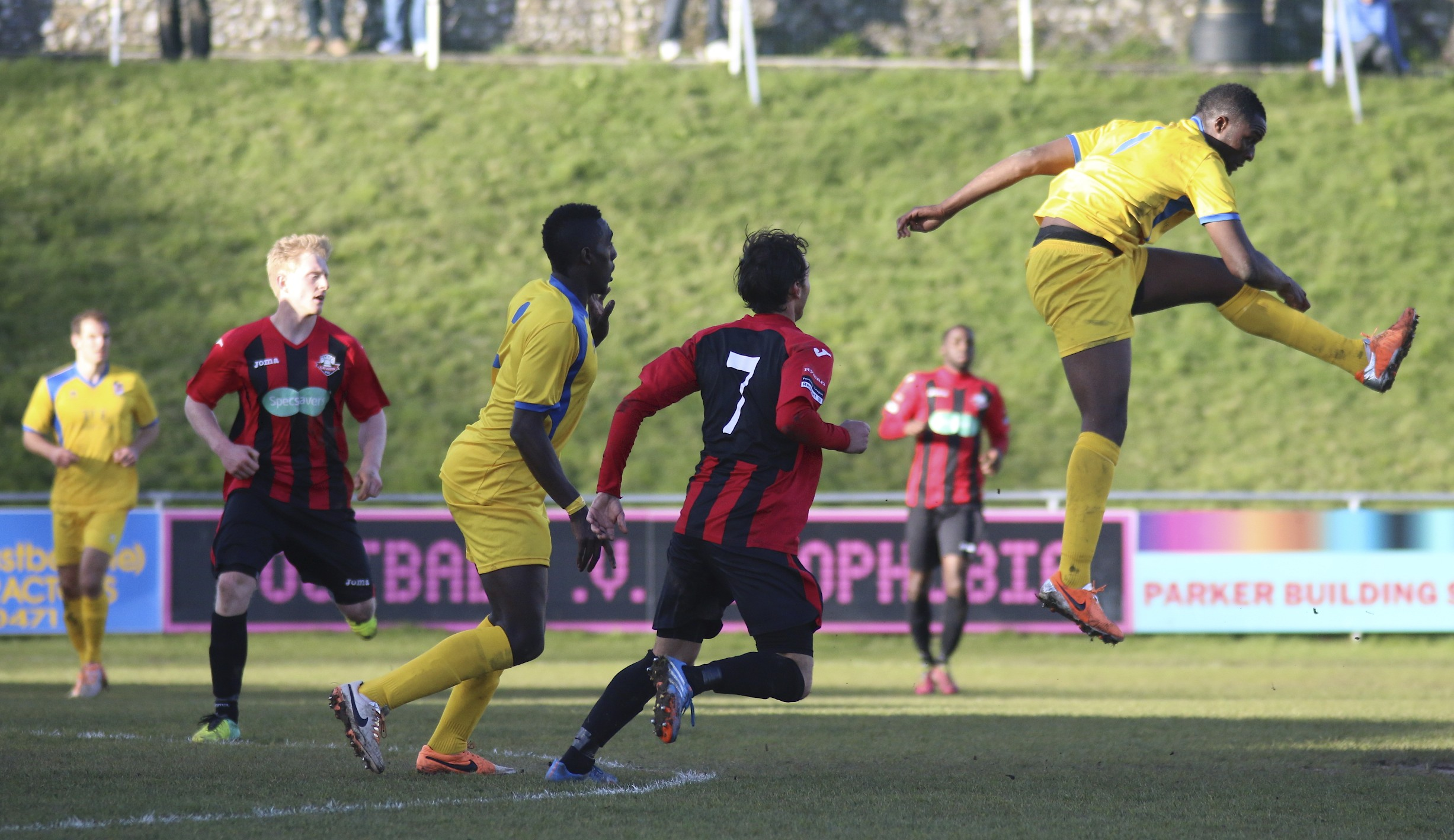
Kingstonian's away kit (in yellow) in a 2014 match against Lewes

The team's current crest contains the motto Palmam Qui Meruit Ferat, the motto of Lord Nelson which translates as "Let he who has earned it carry the palm", and is inscribed on the Britannia Monument. Kingstonian's home kit is red and white hooped shirts, black shorts and red socks. Their away kit is yellow shirts, shorts, and socks.

== Stadiums ==
Stadium	Period
Robert Parker Stadium	2026-
Prince George's Playing Fields	2024–2026
Imperial Fields	2022–2024
King George's Field	2018–2022
Fetcham Grove	2017–2018
Kingsmeadow	1989–2017
Beveree Stadium	1988–1989
Richmond Road	1902–1988

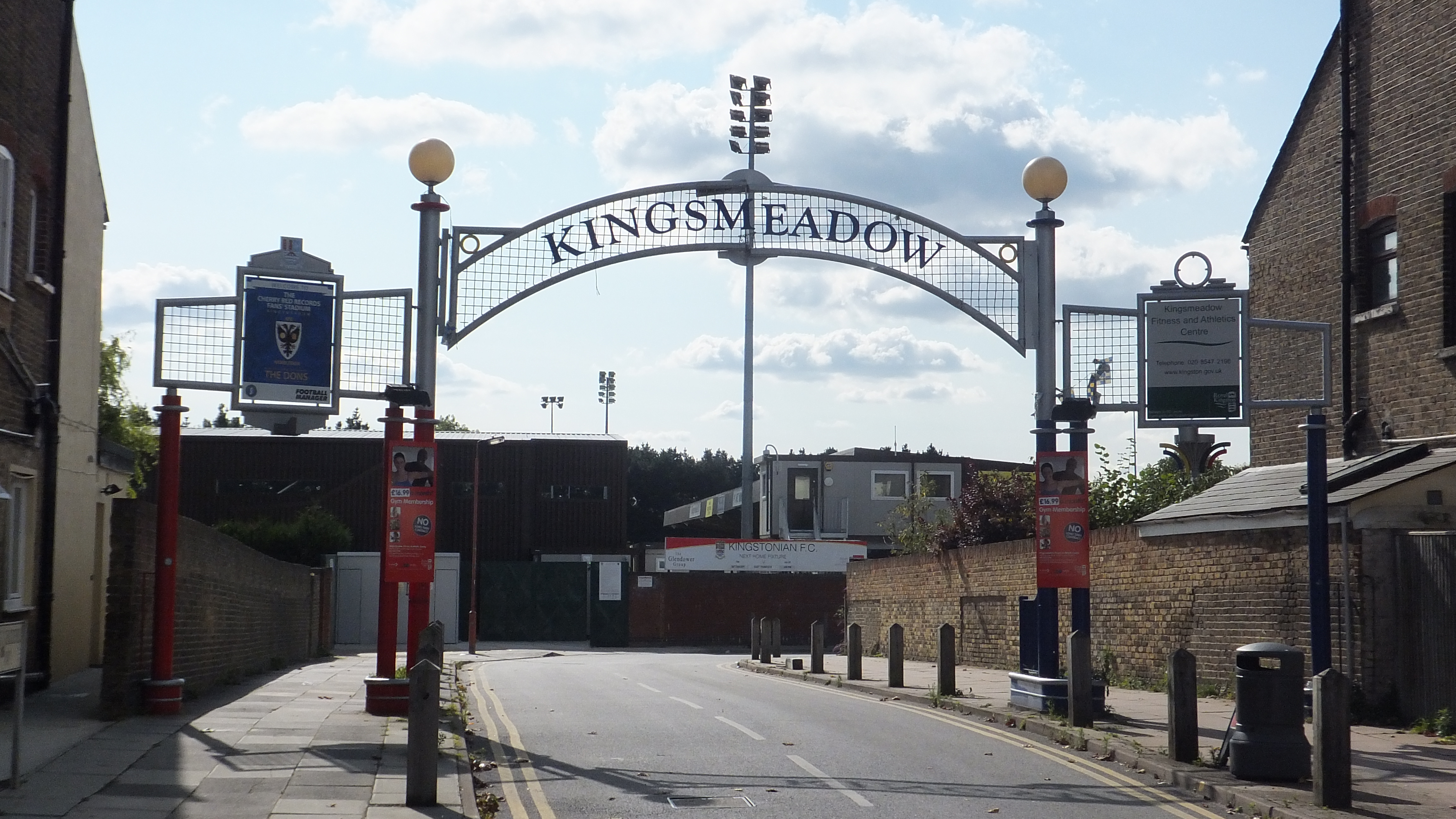
Kingstonian's former home, Kingsmeadow

The early precursors to Kingstonian F.C. played home matches at various locations around the town including Oil Mill Lane (now Villiers Road) and the Fairfield, near Kingston town centre. In 1891 they participated in a tournament at the rugby club ground in Richmond Road, later to become their home.

In 1898 the club moved to their first private enclosed ground at Dinton Road, next to Kingston Barracks, moving again at the turn of the century to Lower Marsh Lane in 1902, specifically to part of the rugby ground in Richmond Road. The split in 1908–09 between Kingston upon Thames A.F.C. and Old Kingstonians led to the breakaway group Old Kingstonians playing at Norbiton Sports Ground, Kingston upon Thames A.F.C. remaining at Richmond Road. Reunited after World War I, the club continued to play at Richmond Road but, in 1920, the site's owners, the Dysarts, leased the site to Leyland Motors, then establishing a factory base at nearby Ham. The club managed to negotiate a ground-sharing arrangement and were eventually able to buy the land, but the issue impacted their performance.

Kingstonian remained at Richmond Road for most of the 20th century, it thus being referred to as the club's 'traditional home'. The club's record home attendance of 8,960 was attained there in 1955 in a match against Bishop Auckland. The maintenance of the site increasingly became more than the club's income could support and parts of the site were sold off for redevelopment; the 'Kingstonian petrol station' occupying much of the Richmond Road frontage since 1956, and the former running track and reserve pitch redeveloped for housing in the 1970s. The club eventually sold the site and moved out of Richmond Road in 1988. The stadium was demolished after 1989 and the remainder of the site redeveloped for housing.

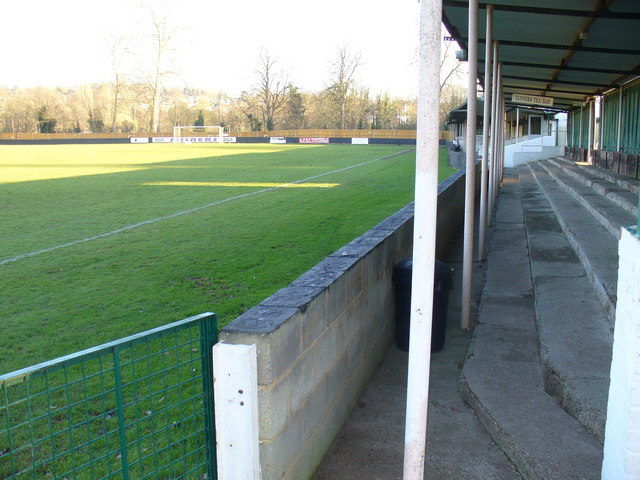
Fetcham Grove. Home of Leatherhead FC and shared by Kingstonian during the 2017–18 season.

After a season and a half ground-sharing at Hampton F.C.'s Beveree ground, Kingstonian opened its new Kingsmeadow Stadium (on the site of the old Norbiton Sports Ground owned by Kingston Council) in August 1989. After Kingstonian entered administration to avoid bankruptcy and lost the Kingsmeadow lease in October 2001. It was assigned in April 2002 by the administrators to a property developer, Rajesh Khosla, who was also by then owner of the club. The fans of AFC Wimbledon, who at that point were already sub-tenants at Kingsmeadow, raised £2.4 million to enable them to buy the lease from Khosla in June 2003, with a view to making Kingsmeadow their home in the short term until their intended move to a site in Wimbledon became more feasible for them. Kingstonian secured a financially favourable 25-year sub-tenancy agreement with AFC Wimbledon, with customary break clauses. The clubs operated a ground-sharing arrangement, with Kingstonian receiving preferentially cheap rental terms.

In 2015, AFC Wimbledon sold Kingsmeadow to Chelsea to help finance their plans to move back to a new stadium in Wimbledon. Chelsea's intention was to use Kingsmeadow as a base for their own youth and women's teams, and were unwilling to accommodate Kingstonian. The sale proved detrimental to Kingstonian, unable to play in a ground where the new owners did not want them. and the club was forced to relocate as a result, starting a groundshare with Leatherhead F.C. at their ground at Fetcham Grove for the 2017–18 season. The following season they moved again to King George's Field in Tolworth, sharing with Corinthian-Casuals Kingstonian reached agreement with Tooting & Mitcham United to play at their Imperial Fields stadium for the 2022–23 season.

In February 2024 it was announced that, starting with the 2024/25 season, Kingstonian would be groundsharing with Raynes Park Vale at Prince George's Playing Fields, Grand Drive for at least two seasons. In March 2026, the club announced that they would be groundsharing with Ashford Town (Middlesex) on an initial two-year period.

== Current squad ==
As of 8 October 2026

Note: Flags indicate national team as defined under FIFA eligibility rules; some limited exceptions apply. Players may hold more than one non-FIFA nationality.

Pos.	Nation	Player
GK	ENG	Zaki Oualah
GK	ENG	Szymon Rudz
DF	IRL	Jack Connors
DF	ENG	Bryan Edwards
DF	ENG	Joe Pratley-Jones (captain)
DF	ENG	Darryl Siaw
DF	ENG	Joe Smith
DF	ENG	Jamie Splatt
DF	ALB	Arsen Ujkaj
MF	ENG	Charlie Bland
MF	ENG	Joel Brown
MF	ENG	Kavell Buckmaster

No.	Pos.	Nation	Player
MF	ENG	James Dobson	
MF	WAL	Reuben Duncan	
MF	ENG	Stan Flaherty	
MF	ENG	Nima Ghandali	
MF	ENG	Cormac Harris	
MF	ENG	Jamie Hilton	
MF	ENG	Dennis Kelmendi	
MF	ENG	Sean O'Brien	
MF	ENG	Rocky Williams	
FW	ENG	Benji Aina	
FW	ENG	Jordan Gallagher	
FW	ENG	Eddie Simon	

== Team management ==
As of 29 October

Position	Name
Manager	Vacant
Assistant Manager	Vacant
First Team Coach	Vacant
Physio	Tiffany Weedon
Kit Managers	Paul Ferrie and Jamie Street
Head of Development	Nigel James
Under 18s Team Manager	Anthony Gale
Head coach	Seungpil Shin
Goalkeeping Coach	Mark Barratt
Board
Chairman	(England) Yioryos Vasilaras
Life Vice President	(England) Gill Trevor
Directors	(England) John Bangs OBE
Directors	(England) Ben Flatt

== Managers ==
As of October 2024

Name	Period	
Peter Gleeson	November 1957 - April 1967	
Tommy Dougall	April 1967 - October 1970	
Vince Burgess	October 1970 - March 1976	
Roy Sleap	April 1976 - March 1977	
Peter Glesson	March 1977 - May 1978	
Barry Rowan	June 1978 - March 1979	
Bill McNully	March 1979 - May 1979	
Ken Ballard	May 1979 May 1982	
Billy Miller	May 1982 - March 1986	
Chris Kelly	March 1986 - May 1994	
Richard Parkin	June 1993 - October 1994	
Micky Droy	October 1994 - January 1995	
Chris Kelly	January 1995 - May 1995	
Billy Smith	May 1995 - September 1996	
Micky Cook	November 1996 - January 1997	Caretaker manager
Graham Westley	December 1996 – 1997	
Geoff Chapple	June 1997 – June 2001	
Bill Williams	August 2001– October 2001	
Steve Sedgley	October 2001 – December 2002	
Kim Harris	December 2002 – August 2004	
Scott Steele	August 2004 – March 2005	
Ian McDonald	March 2005 – May 2006	
Stuart McIntyre	May 2006 – January 2007	
Alan Dowson	January 2007 – May 2014	
Tommy Williams	May 2014 – March 2017	
Craig Edwards	March 2017 – October 2017	
Kim Harris (interim)	October 2017	
Leigh Dynan	October 2017 – February 2019	
Dean Brennan	February 2019 – March 2019	
Kim Harris (interim)	March 2019 – April 2019	
Hayden Bird	May 2019 – June 2022	
Lee O'Leary	June 2022 – November 2022	
Spencer Knight	November 2022 – February 2023	
Simon Lane	February 2023 - February 2024	
Tutu Henriques	February 2024 – April 2024	
Scott Harris	April 2024 – October 2024	
Scott Harris	October 2024 – present	

== Honours ==
Kingstonian's first final came in 1896, when they came second in the Surrey Junior Cup. A notably prolific spell for the club came in the 1930s, when they won seven, and came runners up in two competitions. The dual FA Trophy victories in 1998–99, 1999–2000 were both at Wembley Stadium, and the 2000 final was the last ever FA Trophy final at the old Wembley before the current stadium was built.

Honours won by Kingstonian F.C.
Honour	No.	Years
Isthmian League	3	1933–34, 1936–37, 1997–98 (1947–48, 1962–63, 2013–14 runners up)
Isthmian League Division One	0	(1984–85 runners up)
Football Conference Charity Shield	1	1999 (runners up 2000)
FA Trophy	2	1998–99, 1999–2000
FA Amateur Cup	1	1932–33 (1959–60 runners up)
Conference League Cup	0	(1999–2000, 2000–01 runners up)
Isthmian League Cup	2	1995–96, 2015–16 (1981–82 runners up)
Isthmian League Charity Shield	2	1994–95, 1995–96
Surrey Senior Cup	13	1910–11, 1913–14, 1925–26, 1930–31, 1931–32, 1934–35, 1938–39, 1951–52, 1962–63, 1963–64, 1966–67, 1997–98, 2005–06 (1906–07, 1936–37, 1947–48, 1949–50, 1972–73, 1990–91, 2002–03, 2021–22 runners up)
Surrey Junior Cup	0	(1896–97 runners up)
London Senior Cup	3	1962–63, 1964–65, 1986–87 (1923–24, 1925–26, 1930–31, 1946–47, 1983–84, 2011–12 runners up)

== Records ==
- Record win: 15–1 v DHC Delft (1951)
- Record defeat: 3–12 v Bishop Auckland (1955)
- Most club appearances: Rob Tolfrey – 565*
- Most club goals: Johnny Whing – 295
- Record fee paid: £18,000 – Dave Leworthy (from Rushden & Diamonds, 1997)
- Record fee received: £150,000 – Gavin Holligan (to West Ham United, 1998)
- Record attendance: 9,844 v Bishop Auckland (Richmond Road, 1955)
- FA Cup best performance: Fourth round, 2000–01
- FA Amateur Cup best performance: Winners, 1932–33
- FA Trophy best performance: Winners, 1998–99, 1999–00
