= Robert Bourne =

Robert Bourne may refer to:

- Robert Bourne (politician) (1888–1938), British rower and politician
- Robert Bourne (doctor) (1761–1829), English physician and professor of medicine
- Robert Bourne (footballer) (born 1998), English footballer

== See also ==
- Bob Bourne (born 1954), Canadian ice hockey left wing
