= Phil Purnell =

English footballer (born 1964)

Personal information
- Full name: Phillip Purnell
- Date of birth: 16 September 1964 (age 62)
- Place of birth: Bristol, England
- Position: Midfielder

Senior career*
Years	Team	Apps	(Gls)
- Forest Green Rovers
- Frome Town
????–1985	Mangotsfield United		
1985–1993	Bristol Rovers	153	(22)
1991–1992	→ Swansea City (loan)	5	(1)
- * Club domestic league appearances and goals

Phil Purnell (born 16 September 1964) is a former professional footballer who spent the majority of his career with Bristol Rovers. Before turning professional in 1985, Purnell played for West Country non-league sides Forest Green Rovers, Frome Town and Mangotsfield United, until signing for Bristol Rovers in September 1985. He went on to make 153 league appearances for The Pirates in a 7 1/2-year spell at the club, scoring twenty-two goals. He was loaned to Swansea City for a month in December 1991, where he played five league games and scored once.

Purnell's playing career ended when he suffered a broken leg in April 1993. He was awarded a testimonial match in the summer of 1994, when Bristol Rovers faced a Queens Park Rangers side managed by former Rovers manager Gerry Francis, and featuring a number of former Bristol Rovers players.

After retiring from playing, he worked in insurance, and also continued in football on a part-time basis as assistant manager of Yate Town, where his former Rovers teammate Ian Alexander was manager, and also at Winterbourne United.

== Honours ==
Bristol Rovers

- Football League Third Division: 1989–90
- Associate Members' Cup runner-up: 1989–90

== Sources ==
- "Past Players". swanseacity.net. Swansea City Football Club. 1 May 2008. Archived from the original on 10 July 2010.
- Byrne, Stephen; Jay, Mike (2003). Bristol Rovers Football Club - The Definitive History 1883-2003. Stroud: Tempus. p. 504. ISBN 0-7524-2717-2.
