= Robert Bourne (footballer) =

English footballer

Personal information
- Date of birth: 10 September 1998 (age 28)
- Place of birth: Warrington, England
- Height: 1.83 m (6 ft 0 in)
- Position: Midfielder

Team information
- Current team: Ashton Soldiers

Youth career
- Bury

Senior career*
Years	Team	Apps	(Gls)
2016–2017	Bury	1	(0)
2016	→ Mossley (loan)	9	(0)
2017	Trafford	1	(0)
2017	Stalybridge Celtic	0	(0)
2017	Skelmersdale United	6	(0)
2018	Ytterhogdals IK	16	(1)
2018–2019	Widnes	8	(0)
2019	West Didsbury & Chorlton	6	(0)
2019–	Ashton Soldiers	4	(7)
- * Club domestic league appearances and goals as of 19:04, 10 October 2020 (UTC)

Robert Bourne (born 10 September 1998) is an English footballer who plays as a midfielder for Newton-le-Willows.

== Career ==
Bourne began his career with EFL League One side Bury, after coming through the club's academy he made his debut for the first-team on 8 May 2016 in a league match against Southend United. In the succeeding September, Bourne was loaned to Mossley; appearing nine times. On 6 January 2017, Bury announced that Bourne had been released. He subsequently joined Northern Premier League Division One North club Trafford. His debut came on 14 January against Droylsden. After a month and one appearance, Bourne departed on 14 February to National League North's Stalybridge Celtic. He left on 5 May.

He went on trial with FC United of Manchester in July, featuring in games against AVRO FC and Abbey Hey. On 8 October, Bourne joined Skelmersdale United. His first appearance for the club came on 14 October versus Ramsbottom United. Seven more matches were played for Skelmersdale United. On 1 January 2018, Bourne left English football to join Division 2 Norrland side Ytterhogdals IK in Sweden. He scored his first senior goal in his twelfth appearance, during an away win versus Gällivare Malmbergets on 8 July. He parted company in September, prior to signing for Widnes in October.

In February 2019, Bourne completed a move to West Didsbury & Chorlton. His debut arrived in a fixture with Winsford United on 23 February, as the aforementioned team won 3–2. In the succeeding August, Bourne started playing for Newton-le-Willows in the Warrington & District Football League. He netted on his debut against Eagle JFC on 31 August. Bourne scored a hat-trick over Blackbrook in the Guardian Cup on 30 November.

== Career statistics ==
As of 10 October 2020.

Club statistics
Club	Season	League			Cup		League Cup		Continental		Other		Total	
Club	Season	Division	Apps	Goals	Apps	Goals	Apps	Goals	Apps	Goals	Apps	Goals	Apps	Goals
Bury	2015–16	EFL League One	1	0	0	0	0	0	—		0	0	1	0
Bury	2016–17	EFL League One	0	0	0	0	0	0	—		0	0	0	0
Bury	Total		1	0	0	0	0	0	—		0	0	1	0
Mossley (loan)	2016–17	NPL Division One North	9	0	—		0	0	—		0	0	9	0
Trafford	2016–17	NPL Division One North	1	0	—		0	0	—		0	0	1	0
Stalybridge Celtic	2016–17	National League North	0	0	—		—		—		0	0	0	0
Skelmersdale United	2017–18	NPL Division One North	6	0	—		1	0	—		1 (Note: Appearance(s) in the Liverpool Senior Cup)	0	8	0
Ytterhogdals IK	2018	Division 2 Norrland	16	1	0	0	—		—		0	0	16	1
Widnes	2018–19	NPL Division One West	8	0	—		0	0	—		1	0	9	0
West Didsbury & Chorlton	2018–19	NWCFL Premier Division	6	0	—		—		—		0	0	6	0
Newton-le-Willows	2019–20	WDFL Division 1	12	4	—		—		—		2 (Note: Appearance(s) in the WDFL Guardian Cup)	3	14	7
Newton-le-Willows	2020–21	WDFL Division 1	2	0	—		—		—		0	0	2	0
Newton-le-Willows	Total		14	4	—		—		—		2	3	16	7
Career total			61	5	0	0	1	0	—		4	3	66	8
