= Chris Kelly (footballer, born 1948) =

English footballer

Personal information
- Date of birth: 14 October 1948 (age 78)
- Place of birth: Epsom, England
- Position: Forward

Senior career*
Years	Team	Apps	(Gls)
1968–1970	Tooting & Mitcham United	71	(19)
1974–1975	Leatherhead		
1975	Millwall	11	(0)
1975–1980	Leatherhead		

Managerial career
- 1986–1994: Kingstonian
- 1995: Kingstonian
- * Club domestic league appearances and goals

also played for Sutton United in the early 70s

Chris Kelly (born 14 October 1948) is an English former professional footballer who played in the Football League, as a forward.

== Playing career ==
Kelly began his career at Tooting & Mitcham United before becoming a vital part of Leatherhead's cup run in 1974–1975. As a result of this Kelly received minor celebrity status and because of his outspoken comments became known as the "Leatherhead Lip". On the back of the cup run, Kelly made a brief but unsuccessful move to Millwall in 1975 after which he returned to Leatherhead where he saw out his career.

== Managerial career ==
Kelly managed Kingstonian on two separate occasions, the main being between March 1986 - May 1994, taking over from his former Leatherhead manager Billy Miller, and returned for a shorter stint between January 1995 - May 1995.
