= 2016–17 Bury F.C. season =

Bury
2016–17 season
- Chairman: Stewart Day
- Head Coach: David Flitcroft (until 16 November); Chris Brass (from 15 December – 15 February); Lee Clark (from 15 February)
- Stadium: Gigg Lane
- League One: 19th
- FA Cup: First round replay (vs. AFC Wimbledon)
- League Cup: First round (vs. Burton Albion)
- FL Trophy: Group stage
- Top goalscorer: League: James Vaughan (24); All: James Vaughan (24)
- Highest home attendance: 8,007 vs. Bolton Wanderers, 24 October 2016
- Lowest home attendance: 2,005 vs. Milton Keynes Dons, 14 February 2017
- Average home league attendance: 3,845
Home colours	Away colours

The 2016–17 season was Bury's second consecutive season in League One.

== Transfers ==
=== Transfers in ===
Date from	Position	Nationality	Name	From	Fee	Ref.
1 July 2016	CF	(Scotland)	Nicky Clark	Rangers	Free transfer	
1 July 2016	RM	(England)	Zeli Ismail	Wolverhampton Wanderers	Free transfer	
1 July 2016	CB	(England)	Antony Kay	Milton Keynes Dons	Free transfer	
1 July 2016	GK	(England)	Chris Kirkland	Preston North End	Free transfer	
1 July 2016	LB	(England)	Greg Leigh	Bradford City	Free transfer	
1 July 2016	RB	(England)	Niall Maher	Bolton Wanderers	Free transfer	
1 July 2016	GK	(England)	Ben Williams	Bradford City	Free transfer	
19 July 2016	CB	(England)	Leon Barnett	Wigan Athletic	Free transfer	
21 July 2016	CM	(Guyana)	Neil Danns	Bolton Wanderers	Free transfer	
5 August 2016	CF	(England)	Chris Brown	Blackburn Rovers	Free transfer	
6 August 2016	GK	(England)	Paul Rachubka	Bolton Wanderers	Free transfer	
24 August 2016	CF	(England)	James Vaughan	Birmingham City	Free transfer	
14 October 2016	CF	(England)	Ishmael Miller	Huddersfield Town	Free transfer	
1 January 2017	RW	(Wales)	Jack Mackreth	Macclesfield Town	Undisclosed	
6 January 2017	CB	(England)	Reece Brown	Sheffield United	Free transfer	
19 January 2017	RW	(England)	Jermaine Pennant	Tampines Rovers	Free transfer	
24 January 2017	CF	(England)	Ryan Lowe	Crewe Alexandra	Free transfer	
25 February 2017	RB	(Scotland)	Paul Caddis	Birmingham City	Free transfer	

=== Transfers out ===
Date from	Position	Nationality	Name	To	Fee	Ref.
1 July 2016	CB	(England)	Reece Brown	Sheffield United (Note: Following Reece Brown being released, he later signed for Sheffield United.)	Released	
1 July 2016	RW	(England)	Chris Eagles	Accrington Stanley (Note: Following Chris Eagles being released, he later signed for Accrington Stanley.)	Released	
1 July 2016	LB	(England)	Chris Hussey	Sheffield United	Undisclosed	
1 July 2016	GK	(England)	Rob Lainton	Free agent	Released	
1 July 2016	CF	(England)	Ryan Lowe	Crewe Alexandra	Free transfer	
1 July 2016	CF	(Wales)	Daniel Nardiello	Bangor City (Note: Following Daniel Nardiello being released, he later signed for Bangor City.)	Released	
1 July 2016	CB	(England)	Kiel O'Brien	Southport (Note: Following Kiel O'Brien being released, he later signed for Southport.)	Released	
1 July 2016	GK	(Cyprus)	Michail Papastylianou	Apollon Limassol	Free transfer	
1 July 2016	CB	(England)	Marcus Poscha	Free agent	Released	
1 July 2016	RB	(England)	Joe Riley	Shrewsbury Town	Undisclosed	
1 July 2016	SS	(England)	Danny Rose	Mansfield Town	Undisclosed	
1 July 2016	CM	(England)	Chris Sedgwick	Retired	—N/a	
19 July 2016	CB	(England)	Peter Clarke	Oldham Athletic	Free transfer	
19 July 2016	LB	(England)	Danny Pugh	Blackpool	Free transfer	
27 July 2016	CF	(England)	Leon Clarke	Sheffield United	Undisclosed	
4 August 2016	GK	(England)	Chris Kirkland	Free agent	Mutual consent	
29 August 2016	GK	(Scotland)	Jack Ruddy	Wolverhampton Wanderers	Undisclosed	
31 August 2016	CF	(Scotland)	Nicky Clark	Dunfermline Athletic	Free transfer	
6 January 2017	MF	(England)	Robert Bourne	Trafford F.C.	Released	
6 January 2017	DF	(England)	Liam Williams	Free agent	Released	
31 January 2017	CB	(England)	Jacob Bedeau	Aston Villa	Undisclosed	
31 January 2017	CM	(England)	Tom Soares	AFC Wimbledon	Undisclosed	

=== Loans in ===
Date from	Position	Nationality	Name	From	Date until	Ref.
31 August 2016	DM	(England)	Kean Bryan	Manchester City	End of Season	
31 August 2016	LM	(England)	Tom Walker	Bolton Wanderers	End of Season	
6 January 2017	CB	(Australia)	Cameron Burgess	Fulham	End of Season	
6 January 2017	CB	(England)	Taylor Moore	Bristol City	End of Season	
30 January 2017	GK	(Republic of Ireland)	Joe Murphy	Huddersfield Town	End of Season	
31 January 2017	CB	(Australia)	Tom Beadling	Sunderland	End of Season	
31 January 2017	LB	(France)	Sylvain Deslandes	Wolverhampton Wanderers	End of Season	

=== Loans out ===
Date from	Position	Nationality	Name	To	Date until	Ref.
4 January 2017	CF	(England)	Anthony Dudley	Macclesfield Town	End of season	
31 January 2017	CM	(Guyana)	Neil Danns	Blackpool	End of Season	

== Competitions ==
=== Pre-season friendlies ===
16 July 2016 Friendly	Bury	0–1	Blackburn Rovers	Morecambe
13:00 BST		Report	Graham 7'	Stadium: Mill Farm

16 July 2016 Friendly	Bury	0–4	Morecambe	Morecambe
16:00 BST		Report	Ellison; Trialist; Trialist; Barkhuizen	Stadium: Mill Farm

29 July 2016 Friendly	Radcliffe Borough	4–0	Bury	Radcliffe
19:30 BST	Sonogo 3', 17' (pen.); Rokka 7'; Nalatche 60'			Stadium: Taurus Stadium

30 July 2016 Friendly	Blackpool	1–1	Bury	Blackpool
15:00 BST	Potts 89'	Report	Etuhu 51'	Stadium: Bloomfield Road

=== League One ===
==== League table ====
Pos	Team	Pld	W	D	L	GF	GA	GD	Pts	Promotion, qualification or relegation
17	Oldham Athletic	46	12	17	17	31	44	−13	53	
18	Shrewsbury Town	46	13	12	21	46	63	−17	51	
19	Bury	46	13	11	22	61	73	−12	50	
20	Gillingham	46	12	14	20	59	79	−20	50	
21	Port Vale (R)	46	12	13	21	45	70	−25	49	Relegation to EFL League Two

Source: BBC Sport
Rules for classification: 1) Points; 2) Goal difference; 3) Number of goals scored
(R) Relegated

==== Matches ====
6 August 2016 1	Bury	2–0	Charlton Athletic	Bury
15:00 BST	Danns 71' (pen.); Etuhu 87'			Stadium: Gigg Lane; Attendance: 4,037

13 August 2016 2	Gillingham	2–1	Bury	Gillingham
15:00 BST	Jackson 6'; Kay 57' (o.g.); Hessenthaler (yellow card) 84'; Donnelly (yellow card) 90+3'	Report	Hope (yellow card) 32'; Pope 66'; Mayor (yellow card) 85'	Stadium: Priestfield; Attendance: 5,324 (189 away fans)

16 August 2016 3	Coventry City	0–0	Bury	Coventry
19:45 BST		Report	Etuhu (yellow card) 39'; Soares (yellow card) 66'	Stadium: Ricoh Arena; Attendance: 9,098 (222 away)

20 August 2016 4	Bury	0–1	Oldham Athletic	Bury
15:00 BST	Jones (yellow card) 57'	Report	Barnett 10' (o.g.); Klok (yellow card) 64'; Fané (yellow card) 90'	Stadium: Gigg Lane; Attendance: 4,479 (1,554 visitors)

27 August 2016 5	Walsall	3–3	Bury	Bescot
15:00 BST	Morris 6'; Oztumer 14'; Jackson 32'; Edwards (yellow card) 48'; Dobson (yellow card) 60'	Report	Barnett 47'; Vaughan 49' (yellow card) 65'; Mayor 66' (yellow card) 67'; Soares (yellow card) 88'	Stadium: Bescot Stadium; Attendance: 4,393 (310 Bury)

3 September 2016 6	Bury	4–1	Port Vale	Bury
15:00 BST	Vaughan 6', 30'; Mellis 22'; Maher (yellow card) 66'; Hope 73'; Williams (yellow card) 90+1'	Report	Smith 58'; Amoros (yellow card) 70'; Paterson (yellow card) 79'; Foley (yellow card) 89'	Stadium: Gigg Lane; Attendance: 4,042 (1,298 away fans)

10 September 2016 7	Bury	2–1	Shrewsbury Town	Bury
15:00 BST	Mellis (yellow card) 32'; Vaughan (yellow card) 39' (yellow-red card) 41'; Mayor 65', 90+1'	Report	Deegan (yellow card) 20'; El-Abd (yellow card) 38' (yellow-red card) 52'; Toney (yellow card) 39' (goal) 76'; McGivern (yellow card) 45+1'	Stadium: Gigg Lane; Attendance: 2,990 (360 away fans)

17 September 2016 8	Swindon Town	1–2	Bury	Swindon
15:00 BST	Barry (yellow card) 31'; Yaser Kasim (yellow card) 33'; Raphael Branco (yellow card) 34'; Obika 64'; Thompson (yellow card) 86'	Report	Hope 13', 45' (yellow card) 38'; Mellis (yellow card) 20'; Soares (yellow card) 34'; Kay (yellow card) 66'; Mayor (yellow card) 88'; Pope (yellow card) 90+2'	Stadium: County Ground; Attendance: 6,931 (244)

24 September 2016 9	Bury	2–1	Chesterfield	Bury
15:00 BST	Ismail 41'; Danns (yellow card) 69'; Pope 87'	Report	Anderson (yellow card) 45+2'; Dennis 44'	Stadium: Gigg Lane; Attendance: 3,494 (482 away fans)

27 September 2016 10	Milton Keynes Dons	1–3	Bury	Milton Keynes
19:45 BST	Downing (yellow card) 48'; Reeves 63'; Colclough (yellow card) 82'; Potter (yellow card) 87'	Report	Vaughan 8', 68'; Soares (yellow card) 40'; Ismail (yellow card) 80' (goal) 90+5'; Mellis (yellow card) 83'; Bryan (yellow card) 89'	Stadium: Stadium mk Attendance: 7,652; Referee: Darren Deadman

1 October 2016 11	Bury	1–2	Scunthorpe United	Bury
15:00 BST	Soares (yellow card) 35' (goal) 58'; Mellis (yellow card) 41'; Kay (yellow card) 80'; Etuhu (yellow card) 90+1'	Report	Wiseman 42'; Wallace (yellow card) 45+2'; Morris 65' van Veen (yellow card) 80'	Stadium: Gigg Lane; Attendance: 5,355; Referee: David Webb

8 October 2016 12	Peterborough United	3–1	Bury	Peterborough
12:00 BST	Forrester 38'; Maddison 48'; Kay 52' (o.g.); Coulthirst (yellow card) 86'; Lopes (yellow card) 88'; White (yellow card) 90+1'	Report	White 2' (o.g.); Mayor (yellow card) 61'; Maher (yellow card) 66'	Stadium: ABAX Stadium; Attendance: 3,964; Referee: Tony Harrington

15 October 2016 13	Rochdale	2–0	Bury	Rochdale
15:00 BST	Henderson 38' (pen.); Mendez-Laing 74'; Andrew (yellow card) 79'; Bunney (yellow card) 79'	Report	Maher (yellow card) 17'; Mellis (yellow card) 39' (yellow-red card) 87'; Soares (yellow card) 43'; Vaughan (yellow card) 66'; Bryan (red card) 77'; Miller (yellow card) 79'; Kay (yellow card) 80'	Stadium: Crown Oil Arena; Attendance: 5,344; Referee: Peter Bankes

18 October 2016 14	Bury	1–2	AFC Wimbledon	Bury
19:45 BST	Danns 27' (pen.); Tutte (yellow card) 68'	Report	Robinson (yellow card) 26'; Taylor 39'; Meades 90+1'	Stadium: Gigg Lane; Attendance: 2,211; Referee: Andy Haines

24 October 2016 15	Bury	0–2	Bolton Wanderers	Bury
19:45 BST	Soares (yellow card) 54'	Report	Clough 13' (pen.), 56' (pen.)	Stadium: Gigg Lane; Attendance: 8,007; Referee: Geoff Eltringham

29 October 2016 16	Northampton Town	3–2	Bury	Northampton
15:00 BST	Richards (yellow card) 30' (goal) 36', 64' (pen.); Taylor 71'	Report	Leigh (yellow card) 35'; Ismail (yellow card) 47' (goal) 82'; Kay (yellow card) 48'; Mayor (yellow card) 70'; Miller 74'; Danns (yellow card) 90+2'; Hope (yellow card) 90+7'	Stadium: Sixfields Stadium; Attendance: 5,739; Referee: Carl Boyeson

12 November 2016 17	Bury	1–4	Southend United	Bury
15:00 GMT	Vaughan 20' (pen.); Soares (yellow card) 64'; Barnett (yellow card) 89'	Report	Ranger 9', 61'; Cox 12'; Ferdinand (yellow card) 20'; McLaughlin (yellow card) 64' (goal) 76'	Stadium: Gigg Lane; Attendance: 3,033; Referee: Richard Clark

19 November 2016 18	AFC Wimbledon	5–1	Bury	Kingston upon Thames
15:00 GMT	Parrett (yellow card) 15'; Whelpdale 26'; Poleon 27'; Elliott 28'; Francomb 36' (pen.), 57'	Report	Maher (yellow card) 25'; Vaughan 40'; Barnett (yellow card) 79'	Stadium: Kingsmeadow Stadium; Attendance: 4,141; Referee: Dean Whitestone

22 November 2016 19	Sheffield United	1–0	Bury	Sheffield
19:45 GMT	O'Connell (yellow card) 85'; Ebanks-Landell 90+3'	Report	Mellis (red card) 43'; Pope (yellow card) 44'; Williams (yellow card) 62'; Leigh (yellow card) 80' (yellow-red card) 85'	Stadium: Bramall Lane; Attendance: 19,022; Referee: Ross Joyce

26 November 2016 20	Bury	2–3	Millwall	Bury
15:00 GMT	Jones (yellow card) 45'; Vaughan 61', 67'; Maher (red card) 69'; Kay (yellow card) 71'; Etuhu (yellow card) 90+5'	Report	Williams 70' (pen.); Smith (yellow card) 71'; Butcher 86'; O'Brien 90+2' (yellow card) 90+3'	Stadium: Gigg Lane; Attendance: 3,028; Referee: Jeremy Simpson

10 December 2016 21	Bristol Rovers	4–2	Bury	Bristol
15:00 GMT	Gaffney 32'; Sinclair (yellow card) 41'; Taylor 45+2'; Clarke 67'; Hartley 82'	Report	Burgess 25'; Miller 75'; Danns (red card) 88'	Stadium: Memorial Stadium; Attendance: 7,843; Referee: Rob Jones

17 December 2016 22	Bury	2–3	Oxford United	Bury
15:00 GMT	Vaughan 5'; Pope 39'	Report	Maguire 14', 43'; Leigh 70' (o.g.)	Stadium: Gigg Lane; Attendance: 2,986; Referee: Darren Drysdale

26 December 2016 23	Fleetwood Town	0–0	Bury	Fleetwood
15:00 GMT		Report	Kay (yellow card) 55'; Bedeau (yellow card) 89'	Stadium: Highbury Stadium; Attendance: 4,017; Referee: Nigel Miller

31 December 2016 24	Bradford City	1–1	Bury	Bradford
15:00 GMT	Law 52'	Report	Burgess 39'	Stadium: The Coral Windows Stadium; Attendance: 18,012; Referee: Andy Haines

2 January 2017 25	Bury	1–3	Sheffield United	Bury
15:00 GMT	Mellis 12'; Etuhu (yellow card) 35'; Kay (yellow card) 52'; Vaughan (yellow card) 54'; Soares (yellow card) 62'	Report	Sharp 21'; Etuhu 72' (o.g.); Freeman 81'; Wright (yellow card) 84'	Stadium: Gigg Lane; Attendance: 6,123; Referee: Rob Lewis

7 January 2017 26	Scunthorpe United	3–2	Bury	Scunthorpe
15:00 GMT	Toffolo 8'; Dawson 19'; Wallace (yellow card) 33'; Morris 44'	Report	Miller 41'; Pope (yellow card) 45+2'; Etuhu 67'	Stadium: Glanford Park; Attendance: 5,173; Referee: Eddie Ilderton

14 January 2017 27	Bury	5–1	Peterborough United	Bury
15:00 GMT	Vaughan 7', 16', 24', 27'; Miller 71'	Report	Nichols 4'; Tafazolli (yellow card) 12'; Bostwick (yellow card) 52'	Stadium: Gigg Lane; Attendance: 2,820; Referee: Seb Stockbridge

20 January 2017 28	Port Vale	2–2	Bury	Burslem
19:45 GMT	Walker 20'; Grant (yellow card) 35'; Knops (yellow card) 45'; Taylor 45+4' (pen.) (yellow card) 78'	Report	Vaughan 40', 55'; Burgess (yellow card) 45+3'; Mellis (yellow card) 55'; Etuhu (yellow card) 65'	Stadium: Vale Park; Attendance: 4,338; Referee: Oliver Langford

28 January 2017 29	Bury	3–3	Walsall	Bury
15:00 GMT	Vaughan 22'; Burgess (yellow card) 38'; Brown 45' (yellow card) 70'; Soares 90+1'	Report	Preston (yellow card) 59'; Oztumer 71'; McCarthy 76', 79'	Stadium: Gigg Lane; Attendance: 3,280; Referee: Carl Boyeson

4 February 2017 30	Shrewsbury Town	2–1	Bury	Shrewsbury
15:00 GMT	Deegan (yellow card) 24'; Roberts 47'; Ladapo 77'	Report	Pennant (yellow card) 22'; Kay (yellow card) 82'; Mellis 87'	Stadium: Greenhous Meadow; Attendance: 5,368; Referee: Darren England

11 February 2017 31	Bury	1–0	Swindon Town	Bury
15:00 GMT	Vaughan 37' (pen.) (yellow card) 42'; Brown (yellow card) 79'; Burgess (yellow card) 90'; Barnett (yellow card) 90+4'; Leigh (yellow card) 90+5'	Report	Gladwin (yellow card) 14'; Conroy (yellow card) 86'	Stadium: Gigg Lane; Attendance: 2,713; Referee: Mark Brown

14 February 2017 32	Bury	0–0	Milton Keynes Dons	Bury
19:45 GMT		Report	O'Keefe (yellow card) 57'; Upson (yellow card) 78'; Martin (yellow card) 90+3'	Stadium: Gigg Lane; Attendance: 2,005; Referee: David Webb

18 February 2017 33	Chesterfield	1–2	Bury	Chesterfield
15:00 GMT	Gardner (yellow card) 23'; Dennis 32'; Kakay (yellow card) 60'; Anderson (red card) 78'	Report	Tutte 80'; Burgess (yellow card) 90'; Miller 90+2'	Stadium: Proact Stadium; Attendance: 5,582; Referee: Simon Hooper

25 February 2017 34	Charlton Athletic	0–1	Bury	Charlton, London
15:00 GMT	Byrne (yellow card) 35'; Teixeira (yellow card) 66'	Report	Lowe 21'; Moore (yellow card) 56'; Hope (yellow card) 60'; Kay (yellow card) 72'	Stadium: The Valley; Attendance: 14,640; Referee: Trevor Kettle

28 February 2017 35	Bury	2–1	Coventry City	Bury
19:45 GMT	Vaughan 16'; Pope 40'	Report	Beavon 65'; Kelly-Evans (yellow card) 73'	Stadium: Gigg Lane; Attendance: 2,611; Referee: Scott Duncan

4 March 2017 36	Bury	1–2	Gillingham	Bury
15:00 GMT	Vaughan 75'	Report	Dack 14'; Quigley (yellow card) 43'; McDonald 47'; Nelson (yellow card) 69'; Parker (yellow card) 81'; Byrne (yellow card) 90+1'	Stadium: Gigg Lane; Attendance: 3,203; Referee: Darren Drysdale

11 March 2017 37	Oldham Athletic	0–0	Bury	Oldham
15:00 GMT		Report	Styles (yellow card) 45'	Stadium: Boundary Park; Attendance: 5,776; Referee: Darren Bond

14 March 2017 38	Bury	3–0	Bristol Rovers	Bury
19:45 GMT	Tutte (yellow card) 14'; Vaughan 50' (pen.) (yellow card) 66'; Kay (yellow card) 53'; Leigh 65'; Miller 75'; Barnett (yellow card) 75'; Bryan (yellow card) 90'; Murphy (yellow card) 90+5'	Report	Sinclair (yellow card) 24' (yellow-red card) 39'; Gaffney (yellow card) 90+5'	Stadium: Gigg Lane; Attendance: 2,535; Referee: Ben Toner

18 March 2017 39	Millwall	0–0	Bury	Bermondsey, London
15:00 GMT	Wallace (yellow card) 66'	Report	Murphy (yellow card) 90+4'	Stadium: The Den; Attendance: 9,049; Referee: Gavin Ward

25 March 2017 40	Bury	0–0	Fleetwood Town	Bury
15:00 GMT	Mellis (yellow card) 46'	Report	Schwabl (yellow card) 71'; Glendon (yellow card) 90+2'	Stadium: Gigg Lane; Attendance: 4,174; Referee: Kevin Friend

28 March 2017 41	Oxford United	5–1	Bury	Oxford
19:45 GMT	Johnson 11'; Rothwell 35'; McAleny 39', 49', 90+4'; Dunkley (yellow card) 86'	Report	Lowe (yellow card) 42'; Vaughan 59'; Mellis (yellow card) 80'	Stadium: Kassam Stadium; Attendance: 6,552; Referee: Andy Haines

8 April 2017 42	Bury	0–2	Bradford City	Bury
15:00 BST	Vaughan (yellow card) 40'; Kay (yellow card) 45'; Burgess (yellow card) 78'; Caddis (yellow card) 90+4'	Report	Marshall 56'; Wyke 84'	Stadium: Gigg Lane; Attendance: 5,268; Referee: Trevor Kettle

13 April 2017 43	Bury	0–1	Rochdale	Bury
19:45 BST		Report	Camps 45+1'; McNulty (yellow card) 60'; Rafferty (yellow card) 70'	Stadium: Gigg Lane; Attendance: 4,850; Referee: Darren Bond

18 April 2017 44	Bolton Wanderers	0–0	Bury	Bolton
20:00 BST	Spearing (yellow card) 30'; Vela (yellow card) 65'	Report	Barnett (yellow card) 9'	Stadium: Macron Stadium; Attendance: 18,223; Referee: Simon Hooper

22 April 2017 45	Bury	3–0	Northampton Town	Bury
15:00 BST	Vaughan 3', 90+2'; Miller 72'	Report	Moloney (yellow card) 55'	Stadium: Gigg Lane; Attendance: 5,190; Referee: Nigel Miller

30 April 2017 46	Southend United	1–0	Bury	Southend
12:00 BST	McLaughlin 22'; Robinson (yellow card) 89'; Amos (yellow card) 90+4'	Report	Burgess (yellow card) 26'; Barnett (yellow card) 57'; Moore (yellow card) 59'; Mayor (yellow card) 64'	Stadium: Roots Hall; Attendance: 9,245; Referee: Gavin Ward

=== FA Cup ===
5 November 2016 First round	Bury	2–2	AFC Wimbledon	Bury
15:00 GMT	Hope 27', 29'; Danns (yellow card) 64'; Mellis (yellow card) 90+2'	Report	Taylor 61' (yellow card) 79'; Elliott 67'; Parrett (yellow card) 73'; Robinson (yellow card) 83'	Stadium: Gigg Lane; Attendance: 2,346; Referee: Jeremy Simpson

15 November 2016 First round replay	AFC Wimbledon	5–0	Bury	Kingston upon Thames
19:45 GMT	Robinson 27'; Parrett 32'; Robertson (yellow card) 34'; Poleon 45+2', 72' (yellow card) 63'; Taylor 80'	Report	Barnett (yellow card) 26'; Tutte (yellow card) 50'; Vaughan (yellow card) 52'	Stadium: Kingsmeadow Stadium; Attendance: 2,316; Referee: John Brooks

=== EFL Cup ===
10 August 2016 First round	Burton Albion	3–2 (a.e.t.)	Bury	Burton upon Trent
19:30 BST	Reilly 36'; Beavon 105'; Butcher 113'	Report	Jones (yellow card) 16'; Pope 48' (yellow card) 76'; Mellis (yellow card) 75'; Maher 120'	Stadium: Pirelli Stadium; Attendance: 1,523

=== EFL Trophy ===
Pos	Div	Team	Pld	W	PW	PL	L	GF	GA	GD	Pts	Qualification
1	L1	Bradford City	3	2	0	0	1	5	4	+1	6	Advance to Round 2
2	L2	Morecambe	3	2	0	0	1	7	7	0	6	Advance to Round 2
3	L1	Bury	3	1	0	1	1	6	4	+2	4	
4	ACA	Stoke City U21	3	0	1	0	2	2	5	−3	2	

Source: Sky Sports

30 August 2016 Group stage 1	Bury	4–1	Morecambe	Bury
19:00 BST	Ismail 3' (pen.); Pope 49', 90+1'; Kay (yellow card) 53' (goal) 81'; Soares (yellow card) 83'		Mullin 43' (yellow card) 53'; Wakefield (yellow card) 70'	Stadium: Gigg Lane

4 October 2016 Group stage 2	Bradford City	2–1	Bury	Bradford
19:45 BST	Vučkić 31'; Hiwula-Mayifuila 35'; Filipe Morais (yellow card) 74'	Report	Walker 69'	Stadium: Coral Windows Stadium; Attendance: 1,865

8 November 2016 Group stage 3	Stoke City U23	1–1 (4–3 p)	Bury	Stoke-on-Trent
19:45 GMT	Lecygne (yellow card) 31'; Muniesa (yellow card) 78'; Bojan 86'; Imbula (yellow card) 90'	Report	Kay (yellow card) 59'; Mellis (yellow card) 63'; Miller 68'	Stadium: Bet365 Stadium; Attendance: 698; Referee: Ben Toner
	Penalties
	Banks (penalty missed); Edwards (penalty scored); Campbell (penalty scored); Ngoy (penalty scored); Taylor (penalty scored)		Tutte (penalty missed); Danns (penalty missed); Dudley (penalty scored); Kay (penalty scored); Soares (penalty scored)
