= Vaughan Jones (footballer) =

Welsh footballer

Personal information
- Full name: Vaughan Jones
- Date of birth: 8 September 1959 (age 67)
- Place of birth: Tonyrefail, Wales
- Height: 5 ft 8 in (1.73 m)
- Position: Defender

Senior career*
Years	Team	Apps	(Gls)
1977–1982	Bristol Rovers	101	(3)
1982–1984	Newport County	68	(4)
1984–1985	Cardiff City	11	(0)
1984	→ Bristol Rovers (loan)^{[A]}		
1985–1993	Bristol Rovers^{[A]}	280	(9)
1993–1994	Inter Cardiff	8	(0)
1994–1995	Bath City	11	(0)

International career
	Wales U21	2	(0)
- * Club domestic league appearances and goals

Vaughan Jones (born 8 September 1959 in Tonyrefail) is a Welsh former professional footballer. Jones played his club football for Bristol Rovers, Cardiff City, Newport County, Inter Cardiff and Bath City before finishing his playing career at Cheltenham Town. He went on to be a youth coach at Bristol Rovers before becoming Assistant Manager at Bath City in November 2003, but a year later had left his job in mysterious circumstances.

A Welsh youth international, he also attained two Under-21 caps for Wales.

== Honours ==
Bristol Rovers

- Football League Third Division: 1989–90
- Associate Members' Cup runner-up: 1989–90

== Notes ==
A. The appearances and goals figures in the infobox for Jones's second permanent spell with Bristol Rovers cover both the loan period and the permanent contract, which Neil Brown fails to separate.
