= Warrington & District Football League =

Association football league in England

The Warrington & District Football League was originally formed in 1895 and was reformed in 1919. It is one of the oldest football leagues in England and in 2013 the league become a F.A. Charter Standard League.

Affiliated to the Liverpool County Football Association (L.C.F.A) the Warrington & District League supplies football within a 15-mile radius of Warrington town centre. Split between two English counties of Cheshire and Merseyside, the notable areas in the league are; Warrington, St Helens, Runcorn, Widnes, Knowsley and Newton-le-Willows.

Consisting of four divisions, the league currently has 40+ teams participate in each season. The divisions are the Premier Division and then Divisions One to Three. Notable successes include Warrington Town FC.

== Current Teams 2022-23 ==
=== Premier Division ===
- Croft First
- Grappenhall Sports FC Seniors
- Halebank First
- Halton Borough First
- New Street First
- Pierpoints United AFC First
- Runcorn Albion First
- Sankey Vale First
- Sidac Sports & Social First
- The Village Club, Culcheth First
- Woolston Rovers First

=== Division One ===
- AFC Millbrow Open Age
- Blackbrook First
- Bold FC First Team
- Bruche Athletic First
- Farnworth Griffin First
- FC Brutonwood First
- New Street Y&D
- Rainhill Town YD
- Sankey Vale Reserves
- The Village Club, Culcheth Reserves
- Woolston Rovers Reserves

=== Division Two ===
- Brookvale United JFC Brookvale Beats
- Bruche Athletic Reserves
- Croft Reserves
- Crosfield FC
- Halebank Reserves
- Orford FC 1st Team
- Penlake First
- Rainhill Town YD Reserves
- Sidac Sports and Social Reserves
- St Michaels DH Development
- Woolston Rovers Third Team

=== Division Three ===
- Blackbrook Youth & Dev
- Bold Miners FC
- Crosfield Junior Open Age Reserves
- FC Burtonwood Reserve
- Halton Borough Reserve Team
- Huyton Rovers First
- Joseph Holt FC First
- Orford FC 2nd Team
- Penlake First
- Redgate FC First
- St Michaels DH First
- The Village Club, Culcheth Youth & Devel
- Whitecross FC
