= Ian Hazel =

English footballer (born 1967)

Personal information
- Full name: Ian Hazel
- Date of birth: 1 December 1967 (age 58)
- Place of birth: Merton, London, England
- Height: 5 ft 10 in (1.78 m)
- Position: Midfielder

Team information
- Current team: AFC Wimbledon (first team scout)

Youth career
- ?–1985: Wimbledon

Senior career*
Years	Team	Apps	(Gls)
1985–1989	Wimbledon	10	
1989	→ Bristol Rovers (loan)	3	(0)
1989–1992	Bristol Rovers	18	(0)
1992	Maidstone United	8	(0)
1992–1994	Slough Town	91	(14)
1994–1995	Aylesbury United		
1995–1996	Carshalton Athletic		
1996–1998	Chesham United		
1998–2001	Tooting & Mitcham United		
2003	Banstead Athletic		

Managerial career
- ?–2002: Tooting & Mitcham
- 2003: Molesey
- 2003–2004: Walton & Hersham
- 2006–2007: Sutton United
- 2007–2008: Leatherhead
- * Club domestic league appearances and goals

Ian Hazel (born 1 December 1967) is an English former professional footballer who played as a midfielder.

== Career ==
Hazel began his career as an apprentice with Wimbledon, turning professional in December 1985. He was never a regular with the Dons and moved to Bristol Rovers on loan in February 1989. He joined Rovers on a full contract in July 1989, leaving to join Maidstone United, after a brief spell at Gloucester City, on a non-contract basis in March 1992.

In the 1992 close season, he joined Slough Town, moving to Aylesbury United in August 1994. He moved to Carshalton Athletic in 1995 and to Chesham United in 1996.

In October 1998, Hazel joined Tooting & Mitcham United where he later became player-coach and then manager. He resigned as manager in November 2002. In February 2003 he became manager of Molesey. but left that June after saving the club from relegation.

In November 2003, while working full-time as a coach for Fulham, Hazel joined Banstead Athletic as a player, playing for the first time in three years. In December 2003 he took over as manager of Walton & Hersham, where he went on to have a 17 match unbeaten run.

He worked for the Fulham academy for 18 months until March 2006 when he took over as manager of Sutton United, from where he resigned in October 2007. Two weeks later he took over as manager of Leatherhead. Hazel resigned from first team manager at Leatherhead in 2008.

Hazel worked at Carshalton Athletic as the head of the club's youth academy set-up. He temporarily took charge of the first team on five occasions, the last being in September 2012 following the departure of Paul Dipre from the role.

Hazel later worked at Wimbledon as first team scout.
