= Andy Reece =

English footballer

Personal information
- Full name: Andrew John Reece
- Date of birth: 5 September 1962 (age 64)
- Place of birth: Shrewsbury, England
- Position: Midfielder

Senior career*
Years	Team	Apps	(Gls)
1986–1987	Dudley Town		
1987–1993	Bristol Rovers	239	(17)
1992–1993	→ Walsall (loan)	9	(1)
1993	→ Walsall (loan)	6	(0)
1993–1995	Hereford United	71	(5)
- * Club domestic league appearances and goals

Andrew John Reece (born 5 September 1962) is an English former footballer. Reece, a midfielder, joined Bristol Rovers from Dudley Town in 1987. He was a central figure in the team that won promotion to the Second Division in 1990 and remained there for three seasons. He later joined Hereford United. After joining the police force he was player/manager of Midland Combination side West Midlands Police.

== Early life ==
Reece was born in Shrewsbury on 5 September 1962.

== Career ==
He started his career as a midfielder at Worcester City before joining Willenhall Town who were competing in the Southern League Premier Division for 1985/86 season. He played for Dudley Town from August 1986 until August 1987, when he signed for Bristol Rovers from Dudley Town in 1987. The team won promotion to the Second Division in 1990 for three seasons.

He had loan spells at Walsall from November 1992 to May 1993 and from August 1993 to November 1993. He joined Hereford United in November 1993, and was there until the end of the 1994/95 season.

He joined the police force and became player/manager of Midland Combination side West Midlands Police for seven years from the 1995/96 season.

In July 2002 he joined Grosvenor Park as player / manager. He rejoined West Midlands Police as player / assistant manager. In July 2011 he joined Northern League side Daventry Town as assistant manager.

In July 2012, Andy Reece was dismissed as part of a cost-cutting exercise.

In September 2012, Reece took a position as a scout for Northampton Town.

== Honours ==
Bristol Rovers

- Football League Third Division: 1989–90
