= Ian Alexander (footballer) =

Scottish footballer (born 1963)

Personal information
- Full name: Ian Alexander
- Date of birth: 26 January 1963 (age 63)
- Place of birth: Glasgow, Scotland
- Height: 5 ft 8 in (1.73 m)
- Position: Defender

Senior career*
Years	Team	Apps	(Gls)
1981–1983	Rotherham United	11	(0)
1983–1985	Motherwell	24	(2)
1984	→ Morton (loan)	7	(1)
1985–1986	Pezoporikos Larnaca		(?)
1986–1994	Bristol Rovers	299	(10)
1995–1998	Yate Town		

Managerial career
- Yate Town
- Wotton Rovers
- * Club domestic league appearances and goals

Ian Alexander (born 26 January 1963) is a Scottish former professional footballer, who played the majority of his career at Bristol Rovers.

Alexander played for Rotherham United, Motherwell and Morton, and spent a year playing in Cyprus with Pezoporikos Larnaca, before joining Rovers in 1986. He was appointed manager of Yate Town in 1997. He then managed Wotton Rovers in 2000.

== Personal life ==
In October 2024, Alexander revealed his CTE diagnosis, revealing that he only had a few years to live. CTE is believed to result from repeated head trauma and has left him with severe brain damage sustained during his 13-year playing career. He is among a group of former players pursuing legal action against the Football Association (FA) over the long-term effects of head injuries in football.

== Honours ==
Bristol Rovers

- Football League Third Division: 1989–90
- Associate Members' Cup runner-up: 1989–90

== Bibliography ==
- Byrne, Stephen; Jay, Mike (2003). Bristol Rovers Football Club – The Definitive History 1883-2003. Stroud: Tempus. ISBN 0-7524-2717-2.
