= Leatherhead F.C. =

English football club

Leatherhead
- Full name: Leatherhead Football Club
- Nickname: The Tanners
- Founded: 1907; 119 years ago
- Ground: Fetcham Grove near Leatherhead Leisure Centre
- Capacity: 2,000
- Chairman: John Dean
- Manager: Ian Selley
- League: Isthmian League Premier Division
- 2025–26: Isthmian League South Central Division, 1st of 22 (promoted)
- Website: https://www.leatherheadfc.com/
Home colours	Away colours

Leatherhead Football Club is a football club based in Leatherhead, Surrey, England. The club is nicknamed The Tanners and plays home at Fetcham Grove. They play in the Isthmian League Premier Division. The club is affiliated to the Surrey County Football Association and is a FA Charter Standard club.

== History ==
The club was founded in 1907 as Leatherhead Rose, and originally played friendlies. In 1909 they joined the Dorking and District League, and won the league at the first attempt. After the First World War the team rejoined that league and again won the league championship. The following season they joined the Kingston and District League, and went on to win three league titles before the Second World War.

Leatherhead also had another local club, Leatherhead United, formed in 1924, who won Division One of the Sutton and District League in the 1925–26 season. United also finished third in the Premier League in the 1928–29 season, behind Leatherhead Rose who were runners-up. In the early 1930s Fetcham Grove-based United joined the Surrey Junior League and became Champions at the end of the 1933–34 season. This enabled United to join the Surrey Intermediate League, but they were relegated after a few seasons at the end of the 1936–37 campaign.

After the Second World War officials of the two clubs met; and on 27 May 1946 Leatherhead Football Club was officially formed at a public meeting. The two clubs pooled their financial resources and chose United's Fetcham Grove ground for their home pitch. The club then joined the Surrey Senior League for the start of the 1946–47 season.

They won that league four times in a row, and left the league to join the Metropolitan & District League for the 1950–51 season. The next season they became founding members of the Delphian League. The team played in the Delphian League for seven seasons before joining the Corinthian League. In the 1962–63 season they became the last Corinthian League champions, as the league was disbanded. Along with most of the other sides, they joined the enlarged Athenian League in the new Division One. At the end of their first season in Division One they were promoted to the Premier Division as Champions.

=== 1970s ===
The club reached the semi-finals of the FA Amateur Cup in 1969, losing to eventual winners Skelmersdale United, and again in 1971, falling to Ilford. The hero of this era was "Nobby" Skinner, noted for his ability to "poach" a goal out of nothing. After these cup runs further progress was made in the league when the club joined the Isthmian League for the start of the 1972–73 season.

In the 1974–75 season, The Tanners made national headlines with an FA Cup run that saw them beat Isthmian League rivals Bishops Stortford (First round) and Football League Third Division sides Colchester United (Second round) and Brighton & Hove Albion, managed by Peter Taylor (Third round). In the Fourth round they were drawn at home to First Division Leicester City. It remains the furthest the club has ever reached in the competition. With the game switched to Leicester's Filbert Street at the request of Leatherhead's management, the BBC's Match of the Day cameras and over 32,000 people saw a dramatic match in which Leatherhead went 2–0 up and then saw a goalbound Chris Kelly shot that would have made it 3–0 cleared off the line. Leicester's fitness and class eventually told as they fought back to win 3–2 in the second half.

Kelly was the star player of the side, earning the nickname "The Leatherhead Lip" for his readiness to talk up the team. At the height of the team's success, Kelly appeared on national television, including Match of the Day, Nationwide and Tomorrow's World. Later in the year, his name featured in the BBC sitcom Porridge, on the back page of a copy of The Sun being read by Fletcher.

The following year another budding FA Cup run saw Leatherhead beat Cambridge United, managed by Ron Atkinson.

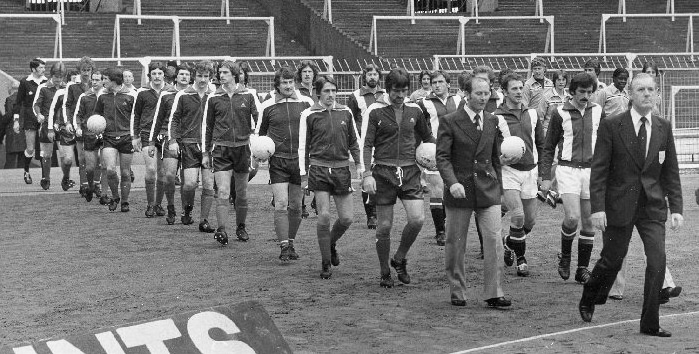
Altrincham versus Leatherhead, FA Trophy Final at Wembley Stadium, April 1978

In 1978, the side reached the final of the FA Trophy, played at Wembley, only to lose 3–1 to Altrincham.

=== 1980s and beyond ===
The Tanners also reached the FA Cup first round in 1980 but lost 5–1 to Exeter City. Three seasons later though the club struggled in the league and was relegated to Division One in the 1982–83 season, and further relegation followed at the end of the 1989–90 season when they were relegated to division two south. Seven seasons later the club finished as Runners-up in Division Two and gained promotion to Division One at the end of the 1996–97 season. However the club could only stay four seasons in Division One before being relegated to Division Two at the end of the 2000–01 season. A season later, upon the league reorganisation, they were placed in Division One South.

In October 2006, they were drawn against Torquay United in the FA Cup first round, the first time in 26 years they had reached this level, going out 2–1.

In 2011, Leatherhead gained promotion, beating Dulwich Hamlet in a dramatic play-off final. The Tanners were 3–1 down going into injury time when Kevin Terry managed to pull two goals back, taking the game to extra time. Terry scored again in extra time to claim his hat-trick and take the Tanners into the Isthmian League Premier Division. However they only managed one season in the top flight of the Isthmian League before being relegated back to Division One South.

In the 2013–14 season, Leatherhead were promoted after winning the play-off final against Folkestone Invicta. Jimmy Bullard managed Leatherhead in the 2016–17 season. In the 2017–18 season Leatherhead reached the second round of the FA Cup, under Sammy Moore, but lost 3–1 away to Wycombe Wanderers. Leatherhead also reached the final of the Surrey Senior Cup and finished 6th in the Isthmian League Premier Division, missing the play-offs on goal difference.

Nikki Bull took over as manager at the start of the 2018–19 season. The 2019-20 and 2020–21 seasons were unfinished due to COVID-19. In August 2021, Martin McCarthy took over as manager from Bull, who stayed with the club to focus on player recruitment. The U23 side moved to the Suburban League and Leatherhead Women FC started playing on Sundays at Fetcham Grove in the South East Counties Women's League.

=== Club operations ===
Financial problems emerged at Fetcham Grove just before Christmas 1999. The club survived that immediate crisis but it seemed that they were doomed in the summer of 2000 when a last-ditch appeal to the local business community for sponsorship failed. It was then that the supporters of the Tanners stepped in to save their club. A group of fans secured a new long-term lease on Fetcham Grove, helping to secure the Tanners' future, under the motto "a club run by its supporters for the benefit of the community".

Tim Edwards (1954–2009) was a leading figure in that group and went on to become club chairman, having previously served as the club's youngest ever committee member, at age 25, and then as press secretary, programme editor and photographer.

== Stadium ==
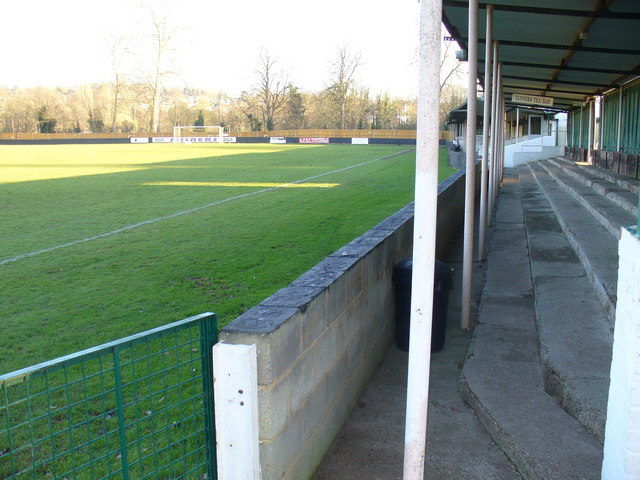
Fetcham Grove

Leatherhead play their games at Fetcham Grove, Guildford Road, Leatherhead KT22 9AS. Parking is available at the adjacent Leatherhead Leisure Centre. Home fans are known to prefer the 'Shed End'. The ground was fitted with floodlights in the 1960s, and inaugurated their floodlights with a match against Fulham. In the summer of 2021, new floodlights were installed at Fetcham Grove.

== Club officials ==
Position	Club Official
Chairman	John Dean
Vice-Chairman	David Pope
Directors	Trevor Kelly
Directors	Jim Gordon
Finance Director	Laurence Hebert

Source: Leatherhead F.C.

== Management team ==
Position	Staff
Manager	Ian Selley
Assistant Manager	Michael Bennett
First-Team Coach	Adam Pittwood
Goalkeeper Coach	Dave Hill
Physiotherapists	Lou Brown
Physiotherapists	Kevin Taylor
Head Kitman	Mark Allan
Assistant Kitman	Bill McNulty

Source: Leatherhead F.C.

== Players ==
=== First team squad ===
As of 26 October 2026.

Note: Flags indicate national team as defined under FIFA eligibility rules; some limited exceptions apply. Players may hold more than one non-FIFA nationality.

Pos.	Nation	Player
GK	ENG	Joe Mather
GK	ENG	Sonny Wheeler
DF	ENG	Cameron Black
DF	ENG	Niran Butler
DF	ENG	Charlie Kennett
DF	ENG	Louie Paget
DF	ENG	Bobby Price
DF	ENG	Kemall Wilson (on loan from Woking)
MF	ENG	James Dickson
MF	IRL	Matt Everitt

Pos.	Nation	Player
MF	ENG	Connor Harris
MF	ENG	Mark Waters (captain)
FW	ENG	Kofi Anokye-Boadi
FW	GUY	Marcel Barrington
FW	ENG	Jacob Breckon
FW	ENG	Deondre Date
FW	ENG	Nathan Hogan
FW	ENG	Anas Igozouln
FW	ENG	Harry Murphy

== Honours ==
=== League honours ===
- Isthmian League South Central Division:
  - Winners (1): 2025–26
- Isthmian League Division Two:
  - Winners (1): 1996–97
- Athenian League Division One:
  - Winners (1): 1963–64
- Corinthian League:
  - Winners (1): 1962–63
- Surrey Senior League:
  - Winners (4): 1946–47, 1947–48, 1948–49, 1949–50
- Surrey Junior League:
  - Winners (1): 1933–34
- Kingston and District League:
  - Winners (1): 1938–39
- Sutton and District League Premier Division:
  - Runners-up (1): 1928–29
- Sutton and District League Division One:
  - Winners (1): 1925–26
- Dorking and District League:
  - Winners (2): 1909–10, 1919–20

=== Cup honours ===
- FA Trophy
  - Runners-up (1): 1977–78
- Isthmian League Cup
  - Winners (1): 2009/10
- Isthmian League Charity Shield
  - Winners (2): 2010–11, 2011–12
- Surrey Senior Cup
  - Winners (1): 1968–69
  - Runners-up (6): 1964–65, 1966–67, 1974–75, 1978–79, 2010–11, 2017–18
- London Senior Cup
  - Runners-up (2): 1974–75, 1977–78
- Surrey Senior Shield
  - Winners (1): 1968–69
- Surrey Intermediate Cup
  - Winners (1): 1968–69

== Records ==
- Highest league position:3rd in Isthmian League, 1972–73
- Best FA Cup performance: Fourth round, 1974–75
- Best FA Amateur Cup performance: Semi-final, 1970–71, 1973–74
- Best FA Trophy performance: Final, 1977–78
- Best FA Vase performance: Second round 1994–95
- Record attendance: 5,500 vs Wimbledon, 1976
- Biggest victory: 13–1 vs Leyland Motors, Surrey Senior League, 1946–47
- Heaviest defeat: 1–11 vs Barking, Isthmian League, 1982–83
- Most appearances: P Caswell, 200

== Former coaches ==
1. Managers/Coaches that have played/managed in the football league or any foreign equivalent to this level (i.e. fully professional league).
- (England) Jimmy Bullard
- (England) Sammy Moore
1. Managers/Coaches with full international caps.
- (England) Ian Hazel
- (England) Mike Bailey
- (England) Jimmy Bullard
