= 2002–03 Port Vale F.C. season =

Port Vale F.C.
2002–03 season
- Owner: Valiant 2001 (March onwards)
- Chairman: Bill Bell (until December); Administrators (December – March); Bill Bratt (from March)
- Manager: Brian Horton
- Stadium: Vale Park
- Football League Second Division: 17th (53 points)
- FA Cup: First Round (eliminated by Crewe Alexandra)
- League Cup: First Round (eliminated by Crewe Alexandra)
- Football League Trophy: Area Quarter-finals (eliminated by Shrewsbury Town)
- Player of the Year: Sam Collins
- Top goalscorer: League: Marc Bridge-Wilkinson (9); All: Marc Bridge-Wilkinson (9)
- Highest home attendance: 6,395 vs. Wigan Athletic, 26 December 2002
- Lowest home attendance: 2,222 vs. Chesterfield, 12 November 2002
- Average home league attendance: 4,436
- Biggest win: 5–1 vs. Huddersfield Town, 26 April 2003
- Biggest defeat: 0–4 vs. Queens Park Rangers, 15 February 2003
Home colours	Away colours

The 2002–03 season was Port Vale's 91st season of football in the English Football League and third-successive season (40th overall) in the Second Division. It proved another difficult year under manager Brian Horton, as the side endured an inconsistent league campaign before narrowly avoiding relegation with a 17th‑place finish on 53 points. In December, the club entered administration amid mounting financial pressure, and in March the Valiant 2001 supporters' group completed a takeover, ending the regime of chairman Bill Bell.

Port Vale's cup adventures were brief. Both the FA Cup and League Cup ended at the First Round, each time following defeats to local rivals Crewe Alexandra — the FA Cup exit came courtesy of a Dean Ashton goal, and Crewe also knocked Vale out of the League Cup by a 2–0 scoreline. The club fared slightly better in the Football League Trophy, reaching the Northern Section Area Quarter‑Finals before being eliminated by Shrewsbury Town.

On the field, Marc Bridge-Wilkinson led the scoring charts for Vale with nine goals in all competitions, despite injury setbacks earlier in the season. The team recorded a season‑highlight result in April with a 5–1 victory over Huddersfield Town, but overall results remained erratic, and average attendance dipped to around 4,436. While the club ultimately survived in mid‑table, off-field challenges around debt, administration, and ownership change loomed large as the campaign closed.

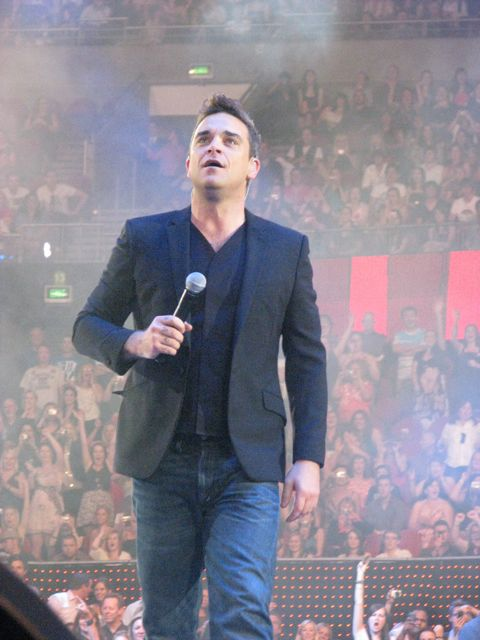
Robbie Williams decided against purchasing the club.

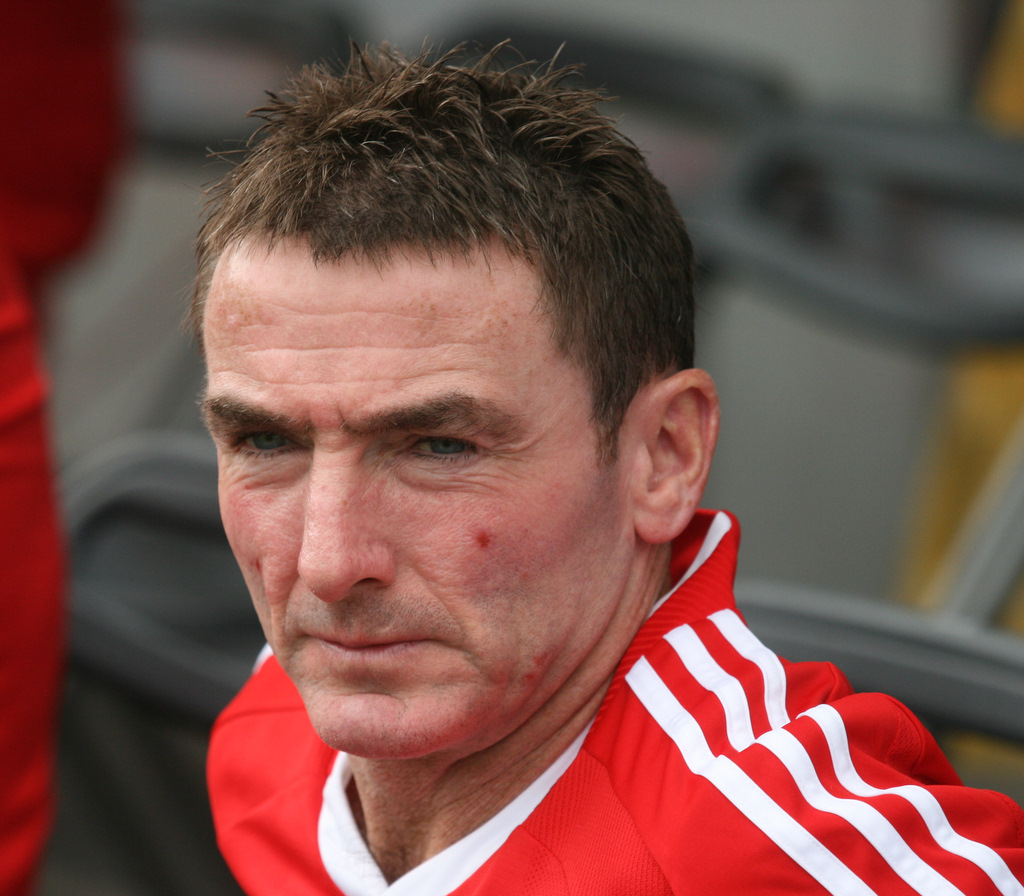
John Durnin left the club at the end of the season.

== Overview ==
=== Second Division ===
The pre-season saw Brian Horton make several free signings: Jon McCarthy (Birmingham City); Brett Angell (Rushden & Diamonds); Ian Brightwell (Walsall); Phil Charnock (Crewe Alexandra); Sam Collins (Bury); and Mark Boyd (Newcastle United). Midfielder Dean Keates had a trial at the club over the summer, but was not offered a contract.

The season started poorly, with four straight defeats. Only one goal scored from open play, causing fans to barrack Horton. Their form changed with a 1–0 win over Wigan Athletic at the JJB Stadium – the first in a sequence of five consecutive victories. Following this run, victories were sparse for the Vale, and they picked up just four league victories until the beginning of March. The club agreed to sell Stephen McPhee to Wigan Athletic for £300,000, though the deal fell through over personal terms. In October, Lee Ashcroft arrived on loan from Wigan Athletic. Meanwhile, Jon McCarthy was released, and signed with Doncaster Rovers. The next month Brett Angell also departed after rejecting a new deal with the club, and instead joined Queens Park Rangers.

A mini-revival began in the new year, as Vale were unbeaten in their three January league games. In February, defender Peter Clarke arrived on a three-month loan deal from Everton. Adrian Littlejohn also joined the club on a monthly contract, having left Lincoln City. On 1 March, Vale were beaten 4–1 away at Colchester United, with Gareth Williams scoring a hat-trick. There was a turnaround in form following a 1–0 win over Blackpool on 8 March, as 18 points from the final twelve games of the season were enough to see off the fan's fears of relegation. Horton remained unpopular with some sections of Vale's supporters. On 12 April, Vale came from behind to beat Northampton Town at home after Horton angrily remonstrated with a supporter in the crowd who demanded his resignation whilst the club were a goal down. The penultimate game of the season was a 5–1 home win over Huddersfield Town, with Ian Armstrong scoring a brace. They finished in 17th place with 53 points, just five points above Cheltenham Town in the relegation zone. They finished 33 points and 15 places behind Crewe, who were promoted as runners-up. The end-of-season table was unusual in that 15 points separated 7th and 8th, whilst 17 points separated 8th and 21st. Marc Bridge-Wilkinson was the club's top scorer with just nine goals in all competitions.

At the end of the season, several players left the club on free transfers: Matt Carragher (Macclesfield Town); Paul Byrne (Barry Town); Phil Charnock (Bury); Sean McClare (Rochdale); John Durnin (Accrington Stanley); and Rae Ingram (Bangor City).

=== Finances, administration & a change of ownership ===
Talks of Bell selling the club circulated at the start of the season, as Staffordshire Police were forced to write off £100,000 worth of debt. Meanwhile, Marketing executive Terry Smith resigned after just six weeks in the job. Bell told the press that the Lorne Street stand would be open at the start of the season, though work never got going on the project. Director Jim Lloyd resigned in September, leaving the club with just Bell and two directors (only one of whom was allowed to vote; Bell had the casting vote in the event of a tie). The club's financial crisis came to a head in the season, with the club £2.4 million in debt and posting £500,000 a year in losses. On 25 November, Bell put his shares up for sale at £10 each.

The club entered administration on 16 December, with £600,000 owed to Inland Revenue and the Customs & Excise; Birmingham-based administration firm Poppleton & Appleby took control. Assistant manager Mark Grew and Ray Williams were both laid off to save money. The club approached millionaire pop star and Vale fan Robbie Williams, who rejected the opportunity to invest in the club. Rumours circulated of a possible merger with rivals Stoke City and a ground-share at the Britannia Stadium, fuelled by the belief that a 'mystery bidder' was the Icelandic owners of Stoke City. Stoke Holdings, the Icelandic company which owned Stoke City, offered Bill Bell £50,000 to buy his debt and thereby take control of the club by bypassing the administrators; however, Bell rejected the offer. Valiant2001 eventually agreed to rent the club shop off Bell as an incitement for him to accept their offer (his vote was needed as he was the club's biggest creditor). The administrators received a number of bids for the club, and received interest from Mo Chaudry (owner of WaterWorld), Summerbank Management (Tunstall based consultancy firm), and property developing duo Steve Ball and Iain McIntosh. A late bid from Gianni Paladini seemed likely to succeed, however, Bill Bratt's 'Valiant 2001' fan-based consortium's bid was accepted in March, and the group took control the following month. The group had had a £1 million bid rejected by Bell the previous year. The total cost of administration was £255,000, and Bratt said "It has been a ride of terror".

In May, the club announced a new two-year £200,000 shirt sponsorship deal with local mobile phone company Tricell, ending ten years of sponsorship from Tunstall Assurance. The new board also appointed former player Andy Porter as youth coach, and got the club's transfer embargo lifted in July.

=== Cup competitions ===
In the FA Cup, Vale were knocked out by nearby Crewe Alexandra with a Dean Ashton goal.

In the League Cup, Crewe made the first of their three visits to Vale Park (all of which they won) and advanced with a 2–0 victory, both goals scored by Rodney Jack.

In the Football League Trophy, Vale advanced through the opening rounds with home wins over Hull City and Chesterfield (after a penalty shoot-out). In the Northern Section Quarter-Finals, they faced Shrewsbury Town at Gay Meadow and lost 2–1.

== Results ==
=== Football League Second Division ===
==== League table ====
Pos	Team	Pld	W	D	L	GF	GA	GD	Pts
15	Notts County	46	13	16	17	62	70	−8	55
16	Brentford	46	14	12	20	47	56	−9	54
17	Port Vale	46	14	11	21	54	70	−16	53
18	Wycombe Wanderers	46	13	13	20	59	66	−7	52
19	Barnsley	46	13	13	20	51	64	−13	52

Rules for classification: In the Football League goals scored (GF) takes precedence over goal difference (GD).

==== Results by matchday ====
Round	1	2	3	4	5	6	7	8	9	10	11	12	13	14	15	16	17	18	19	20	21	22	23	24	25	26	27	28	29	30	31	32	33	34	35	36	37	38	39	40	41	42	43	44	45	46
Ground	H	A	A	H	A	H	A	H	H	A	H	A	H	A	H	A	H	A	A	H	A	H	H	A	A	A	H	A	H	H	A	H	H	A	A	H	A	H	H	A	A	H	A	H	H	A
Result	L	L	L	L	W	W	W	W	W	L	L	D	D	D	L	W	D	D	L	W	L	L	L	L	D	W	D	L	L	W	L	D	L	L	L	W	D	W	L	D	W	W	L	D	W	L
Position	24	24	24	24	22	19	15	11	9	10	13	12	12	14	14	12	13	13	16	12	14	15	18	19	17	15	15	16	19	15	17	19	19	20	22	19	20	18	19	19	17	16	19	18	16	17
Points	0	0	0	0	3	6	9	12	15	15	15	16	17	18	18	21	22	23	23	26	26	26	26	26	27	30	31	31	31	34	34	35	35	35	35	38	39	42	42	43	46	49	49	50	53	53

Source: Statto
A = Away; H = Home; W = Win; D = Draw; L = Loss

==== Matches ====
10 August 2002 1	Port Vale	1–4	Tranmere Rovers	Burslem
	Brooker 26'	Report	Koumas 40'; Haworth 45', 81'; Allen 47'	Stadium: Vale Park; Attendance: 5,629; Referee: Steve Baines

13 August 2002 2	Cardiff City	3–1	Port Vale	Cardiff
	Thorne 4'; Fortune-West 9'; Legg 69'	Report	Bridge-Wilkinson 40' (pen.)	Stadium: Ninian Park; Attendance: 13,296; Referee: Paul Rejer

17 August 2002 3	Chesterfield	2–1	Port Vale	Chesterfield, Derbyshire
	Edwards 46'; Brandon 86'	Report	Angell 90' (pen.)	Stadium: Saltergate; Attendance: 3,598; Referee: Roy Pearson

24 August 2002 4	Port Vale	0–1	Stockport County	Burslem
		Report	Beckett 17'	Stadium: Vale Park; Attendance: 4,070; Referee: Howard Webb

26 August 2002 5	Wigan Athletic	0–1	Port Vale	Wigan
		Report	Armstrong 45'	Stadium: JJB Stadium; Attendance: 6,532; Referee: Graham Frankland

31 August 2002 6	Port Vale	1–0	Peterborough United	Burslem
	Angell 85'	Report		Stadium: Vale Park; Attendance: 3,862; Referee: Graham Salisbury

7 September 2002 7	Swindon Town	1–2	Port Vale	Swindon
13:30 BST	Gurney 7'	Report	Bridge-Wilkinson 9', 68'	Stadium: County Ground; Attendance: 5,029; Referee: Paul Taylor

14 September 2002 8	Port Vale	1–0	Colchester United	Burslem
	Collins 47'	Report		Stadium: Vale Park; Attendance: 3,328; Referee: Mike Ryan

17 September 2002 9	Port Vale	3–2	Notts County	Burslem
	Angell 6', 81'; Paynter 58'	Report	Bolland; Allsopp	Stadium: Vale Park; Attendance: 3,505; Referee: Peter Walton

21 September 2002 10	Blackpool	3–2	Port Vale	Blackpool
	Murphy 63', 64'; Clarke 81'	Report	Collins 23'; Bridge-Wilkinson 71'	Stadium: Bloomfield Road; Attendance: 7,756; Referee: George Cain

28 September 2002 11	Port Vale	2–3	Bristol City	Burslem
	Paynter 61'; Cummins 89'	Report	Beadle 18'; Murray 40'; Lita 90'	Stadium: Vale Park; Attendance: 4,286; Referee: Ray Olivier

5 October 2002 12	Huddersfield Town	2–2	Port Vale	Huddersfield
	Smith 12'; Baldry 17'	Report	Collins 5'; Paynter 29'	Stadium: Kirklees Stadium; Attendance: 9,091; Referee: Scott Mathieson

12 October 2002 13	Port Vale	1–1	Oldham Athletic	Burslem
	McPhee 66'	Report	Holden 49'	Stadium: Vale Park; Attendance: 5,563; Referee: Dermot Gallagher

19 October 2002 14	Brentford	1–1	Port Vale	Brentford, West London
	Hunt 56' (pen.)	Report	Paynter 68'	Stadium: Griffin Park; Attendance: 5,177; Referee: Paul Armstrong

26 October 2002 15	Port Vale	1–2	Crewe Alexandra	Burslem
	Angell 56'	Report	Hulse 32', 81'	Stadium: Vale Park; Attendance: 6,374; Referee: Eddie Evans

29 October 2002 16	Cheltenham Town	0–1	Port Vale	Cheltenham
		Report	Bridge-Wilkinson 33' (pen.)	Stadium: Whaddon Road; Attendance: 3,852; Referee: Frazer Stretton

2 November 2002 17	Port Vale	0–0	Queens Park Rangers	Burslem
		Report		Stadium: Vale Park; Attendance: 4,394; Referee: Alan Butler

9 November 2002 18	Luton Town	0–0	Port Vale	Luton
		Report		Stadium: Kenilworth Road; Attendance: 6,112; Referee: Paul Robinson

23 November 2002 19	Northampton Town	3–0	Port Vale	Northampton
	Gabbiadini 38', 56'; Forrester 89'	Report		Stadium: Sixfields Stadium; Attendance: 4,357; Referee: George Cain

30 November 2002 20	Port Vale	4–2	Mansfield Town	Burslem
	Cummins 30', 33'; Armstrong 50'; Paynter 66'	Report	Corden 1'; Christie 67'	Stadium: Vale Park; Attendance: 3,880; Referee: Tony Leake

14 December 2002 21	Wycombe Wanderers	3–1	Port Vale	High Wycombe
	Thomson 40'; Devine 75' (pen.), 90'	Report	Armstrong 49'	Stadium: Adams Park; Attendance: 5,229; Referee: Joe Ross

21 December 2002 22	Port Vale	1–2	Plymouth Argyle	Burslem
	Brooker 26'	Report	Evans 2'; Keith 40'	Stadium: Vale Park; Attendance: 4,892; Referee: Phil Prosser

26 December 2002 23	Port Vale	0–1	Wigan Athletic	Burslem
		Report	de Vos 69'	Stadium: Vale Park; Attendance: 6,395; Referee: Phil Joslin

28 December 2002 24	Barnsley	2–1	Port Vale	Barnsley
	Fallon 12'; Gibbs 79' (pen.)	Report	Bridge-Wilkinson 43'	Stadium: Oakwell; Attendance: 9,291; Referee: George Cain

1 January 2003 25	Stockport County	1–1	Port Vale	Stockport
	Burgess 31' (pen.)	Report	Brooker 71'	Stadium: Edgeley Park; Attendance: 4,390; Referee: Colin Webster

18 January 2003 26	Peterborough United	1–2	Port Vale	Peterborough
	Clarke 82'	Report	Brooker 73'; Bridge-Wilkinson 90'	Stadium: London Road Stadium; Attendance: 4,770; Referee: Keith Hill

25 January 2003 27	Port Vale	0–0	Barnsley	Burslem
		Report		Stadium: Vale Park; Attendance: 4,033; Referee: Mark Warren

1 February 2003 28	Tranmere Rovers	1–0	Port Vale	Prenton
	McClare 31' (og.)	Report		Stadium: Prenton Park; Attendance: 7,461; Referee: Paul Robinson

8 February 2003 29	Port Vale	1–2	Luton Town	Burslem
	Boyd 87'	Report	Thorpe 49'; Nicholls 76' (pen.)	Stadium: Vale Park; Attendance: 4,714; Referee: Lee Mason

11 February 2003 30	Port Vale	5–2	Chesterfield	Burslem
	McPhee 2'; Boyd 10', 66'; Armstrong 14'; Brooker 18'	Report	Edwards 34'; Ebdon 45'	Stadium: Vale Park; Attendance: 3,039; Referee: Carl Boyeson

15 February 2003 31	Queens Park Rangers	4–0	Port Vale	Shepherd's Bush, West London
	Shittu 52'; Furlong 61'; Padula 79'; Gallen 89'	Report		Stadium: Loftus Road; Attendance: 13,703; Referee: Steve Tomlin

22 February 2003 32	Port Vale	1–1	Swindon Town	Burslem
	Armstrong 46'	Report	Parkin 54'	Stadium: Vale Park; Attendance: 4,085; Referee: Roy Pearson

25 February 2003 33	Port Vale	0–2	Cardiff City	Burslem
		Report	Gordon 35'; Thorne 64'	Stadium: Vale Park; Attendance: 3,831; Referee: Paul Taylor

1 March 2003 34	Colchester United	4–1	Port Vale	Colchester
	Williams 7', 36', 72'; Keith	Report	Bridge-Wilkinson	Stadium: Layer Road; Attendance: 3,581; Referee: Scott Mathieson

4 March 2003 35	Notts County	1–0	Port Vale	Nottingham
	Stallard 59'	Report		Stadium: Meadow Lane; Attendance: 6,302; Referee: Colin Webster

8 March 2003 36	Port Vale	1–0	Blackpool	Burslem
	Bridge-Wilkinson 49' (pen.)	Report		Stadium: Vale Park; Attendance: 4,394; Referee: Andy Penn

15 March 2003 37	Crewe Alexandra	1–1	Port Vale	Crewe
	Sorvel 54'	Report	Brisco 73'	Stadium: Gresty Road; Attendance: 8,146; Referee: Eddie Ilderton

18 March 2003 38	Port Vale	1–0	Brentford	Burslem
	Collins 36'	Report		Stadium: Vale Park; Attendance: 3,241; Referee: Graham Salisbury

22 March 2003 39	Port Vale	1–2	Cheltenham Town	Burslem
	McPhee 74'	Report	McCann 43'; Alsop 81'	Stadium: Vale Park; Attendance: 4,800; Referee: Tony Leake

29 March 2003 40	Oldham Athletic	1–1	Port Vale	Oldham
	Eyres 28'	Report	Cummins 36'	Stadium: Boundary Park; Attendance: 7,209; Referee: Paul Rejer

5 April 2003 41	Mansfield Town	0–1	Port Vale	Mansfield
		Report	Durnin 45'	Stadium: Field Mill; Attendance: 4,538; Referee: Paul Danson

12 April 2003 42	Port Vale	3–2	Northampton Town	Burslem
	Walsh 11'; Clarke 90'; Littlejohn 90'	Report	Gabbiadini 62'; Dudfield 89'	Stadium: Vale Park; Attendance: 4,209; Referee: Trevor Parkes

19 April 2003 43	Plymouth Argyle	3–0	Port Vale	Plymouth
	Coughlan 56'; Norris 67'; Wotton 77'	Report		Stadium: Home Park; Attendance: 12,587; Referee: Mark Warren

21 April 2003 44	Port Vale	1–1	Wycombe Wanderers	Burslem
	Littlejohn 5'	Report	Harris 57'	Stadium: Vale Park; Attendance: 3,590; Referee: Howard Webb

26 April 2003 45	Port Vale	5–1	Huddersfield Town	Burslem
	Armstrong 18', 59'; Littlejohn 31'; Collins 82'; Charnock 87'	Report	Gavin 45'	Stadium: Vale Park; Attendance: 5,925; Referee: Phil Joslin

3 May 2003 46	Bristol City	2–0	Port Vale	Ashton Gate, Bristol
	Murray 31'; Peacock 43'	Report		Stadium: Ashton Gate; Attendance: 12,410; Referee: Mike Riley

=== FA Cup ===
16 November 2002 R1	Port Vale	0–1	Crewe Alexandra	Burslem
		Report	Ashton 85'	Stadium: Vale Park; Attendance: 5,507; Referee: Frazer Stretton

=== League Cup ===
10 September 2002 R1	Port Vale	0–2	Crewe Alexandra	Burslem
		Report	Jack 17', 20'	Stadium: Vale Park; Attendance: 3,765; Referee: Graham Laws

=== Football League Trophy ===
22 October 2002 R1	Port Vale	3–1	Hull City	Burslem
19:45 BST	Angell 9', 34'; Carragher 79'	Report	Donaldson 72'	Stadium: Vale Park; Attendance: 2,621; Referee: Howard Webb

12 November 2002 R2	Port Vale	1–1 (a.e.t.) (4–3 p)	Chesterfield	Burslem
	Armstrong 29'	Report	Brandon 8'	Stadium: Vale Park; Attendance: 2,222; Referee: Mike Jones
	Penalties
	Collins (penalty scored); Carragher (penalty scored); Goodlad (penalty scored); McPhee (penalty scored); Durnin (penalty missed); Brooker (penalty missed); Boyd (penalty missed)		Howard (penalty scored); Brandon (penalty scored); Smith (penalty scored); Payne (penalty missed); Dawson (penalty missed); O'Hare (penalty missed); Davies (penalty missed)
Note: Penalty taker ordered is not sequenced.

10 December 2002 Northern Section Quarter-final	Shrewsbury Town	2g–1 (a.e.t.)	Port Vale	Shrewsbury
	Rodgers; Lowe	Report	Boyd 61'	Stadium: Gay Meadow; Attendance: 2,597; Referee: Mark Cowburn

== Squad statistics ==
=== Appearances and goals ===
Key to positions: GK – Goalkeeper; DF – Defender; MF – Midfielder; FW – Forward

No.	Pos	Nat	Player	Total		Second Division		FA Cup		League Cup		Football League Trophy	
No.	Pos	Nat	Player	Apps	Goals	Apps	Goals	Apps	Goals	Apps	Goals	Apps	Goals
1	GK	(England) ENG	Mark Goodlad	42	0	37	0	1	0	1	0	3	0
2	DF	(England) ENG	Matt Carragher	40	1	35	0	1	0	1	0	3	1
3	DF	(England) ENG	Rae Ingram	4	0	4	0	0	0	0	0	0	0
4	MF	(England) ENG	Sean McClare	21	0	17	0	1	0	0	0	3	0
5	DF	(England) ENG	Michael Walsh	18	1	17	1	0	0	1	0	0	0
6	DF	(England) ENG	Sam Collins	49	5	44	5	1	0	1	0	3	0
7	MF	(England) ENG	Neil Brisco	24	1	24	1	0	0	0	0	0	0
8	MF	(Republic of Ireland) IRL	Micky Cummins	35	4	30	4	1	0	1	0	3	0
9	FW	(England) ENG	Steve Brooker	30	5	26	5	1	0	1	0	2	0
10	FW	(Scotland) SCO	Stephen McPhee	45	3	40	3	1	0	1	0	3	0
11	MF	(England) ENG	Marc Bridge-Wilkinson	33	9	31	9	0	0	1	0	1	0
12	GK	(England) ENG	Dean Delany	10	0	10	0	0	0	0	0	0	0
13	MF	(England) ENG	Levi Reid	1	0	1	0	0	0	0	0	0	0
14	MF	(England) ENG	Mark Boyd	24	4	20	3	1	0	1	0	2	1
15	MF	(England) ENG	Ian Armstrong	34	8	29	7	1	0	1	0	3	1
16	DF	(Wales) WAL	Steve Rowland	27	0	25	0	0	0	0	0	2	0
17	DF	(South Africa) RSA	Paul Byrne	9	0	9	0	0	0	0	0	0	0
18	FW	(England) ENG	Billy Paynter	34	5	31	5	1	0	0	0	2	0
19	MF	(England) ENG	Phil Charnock	22	1	18	1	1	0	0	0	3	0
20	MF	(England) ENG	John Durnin	31	1	28	1	1	0	0	0	2	0
21	DF	(Northern Ireland) NIR	Liam Burns	19	0	16	0	1	0	0	0	2	0
22	DF	(England) ENG	Ryan Brown	1	0	1	0	0	0	0	0	0	0
23	DF	(England) ENG	Ian Brightwell	38	0	35	0	1	0	1	0	1	0
25	MF	(Trinidad and Tobago) TTO	Chris Birchall	2	0	2	0	0	0	0	0	0	0
26	FW	(England) ENG	Simon Eldershaw	2	0	2	0	0	0	0	0	0	0
27	MF	(England) ENG	Adrian Littlejohn	13	3	13	3	0	0	0	0	0	0
Players who featured but departed the club during the season:
22	FW	(England) ENG	Brett Angell	17	7	15	5	0	0	1	0	1	2
24	MF	(Northern Ireland) NIR	Jon McCarthy	9	0	8	0	0	0	1	0	0	0
24	FW	(England) ENG	Lee Ashcroft	4	0	3	0	0	0	0	0	1	0
24	DF	(England) ENG	Peter Clarke	13	1	13	1	0	0	0	0	0	0

=== Top scorers ===
Place	Position	Nation	Number	Name	Second Division	FA Cup	League Cup	Football League Trophy	Total
1	MF	England	11	Marc Bridge-Wilkinson	9	0	0	0	9
2	MF	England	15	Ian Armstrong	7	1	0	0	8
3	FW	England	22	Brett Angell	5	2	0	0	7
4	DF	England	6	Sam Collins	5	0	0	0	5
–	FW	England	18	Billy Paynter	5	0	0	0	5
–	FW	England	9	Steve Brooker	5	0	0	0	5
7	MF	Ireland	8	Micky Cummins	4	0	0	0	4
–	MF	England	14	Mark Boyd	3	1	0	0	4
9	FW	England	10	Stephen McPhee	3	0	0	0	3
–	MF	England	27	Adrian Littlejohn	3	0	0	0	3
11	DF	England	5	Michael Walsh	1	0	0	0	1
–	DF	England	24	Peter Clarke	1	0	0	0	1
–	MF	England	7	Neil Brisco	1	0	0	0	1
–	MF	England	20	John Durnin	1	0	0	0	1
–	MF	England	19	Phil Charnock	1	0	0	0	1
–	DF	England	2	Matt Carragher	0	1	0	0	1
				TOTALS	54	5	0	0	59

== Transfers ==
=== Transfers in ===
Date from	Position	Nationality	Name	From	Fee	Ref.
May 2002	MF	ENG	Mark Boyd	Newcastle United	Free transfer	
June 2002	DF	ENG	Sam Collins	Bury	Free transfer	
August 2002	FW	ENG	Brett Angell	Rushden & Diamonds	Free transfer	
August 2002	DF	ENG	Ian Brightwell	Stoke City	Free transfer	
August 2002	MF	ENG	Phil Charnock	Crewe Alexandra	Free transfer	
August 2002	MF	NIR	Jon McCarthy	Birmingham City	Free transfer	
February 2003	MF	ENG	Adrian Littlejohn	Sheffield United	Free transfer	

=== Transfers out ===
Date from	Position	Nationality	Name	To	Fee	Ref.
October 2002	MF	NIR	Jon McCarthy	Doncaster Rovers	Released	
November 2002	FW	ENG	Brett Angell	Queens Park Rangers	Free transfer	
May 2003	DF	ENG	Matt Carragher	Stafford Rangers	Released	
May 2003	MF	ENG	John Durnin	Accrington Stanley	Released	
May 2003	DF	ENG	Rae Ingram	(Wales) Bangor City	Released	
May 2003	MF	ENG	Sean McClare	Rochdale	Released	
July 2003	MF	RSA	Paul Byrne	(Wales) Barry Town	Free transfer	
August 2003	MF	ENG	Phil Charnock	Bury	Free transfer	

=== Loans in ===
Date from	Position	Nationality	Name	From	Date to	Ref.
11 October 2002	FW	ENG	Lee Ashcroft	Wigan Athletic	27 October 2002	
20 February 2003	DF	ENG	Peter Clarke	Everton	29 April 2003	
