= Chris Birchall =

Trinidadian footballer (born 1984)

Chris Birchall CM
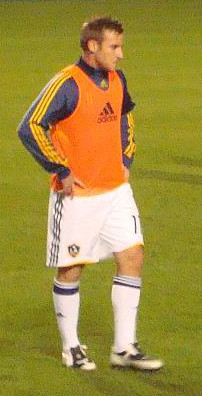
- Birchall training for the Galaxy (October 2011).

Personal information
- Full name: Christopher Birchall
- Date of birth: 5 May 1984 (age 42)
- Place of birth: Stafford, England
- Height: 5 ft 9 in (1.75 m)
- Position: Midfielder

Youth career
- 1993–2001: Port Vale

Senior career*
Years	Team	Apps	(Gls)
2001–2006	Port Vale	78	(7)
2006–2009	Coventry City	29	(2)
2007	→ St Mirren (loan)	9	(0)
2008	→ Carlisle United (loan)	2	(0)
2009	Brighton & Hove Albion	9	(0)
2009–2011	LA Galaxy	66	(1)
2012	Columbus Crew	18	(1)
2013–2016	Port Vale	75	(7)
2016–2017	Kidsgrove Athletic		
Total		286	(18)

International career
2005–2013	Trinidad and Tobago	44	(4)
- * Club domestic league appearances and goals

Christopher Birchall CM (born 5 May 1984) is a former professional footballer who played as a midfielder, scoring 21 goals in 322 appearances in a 16-year professional career. Born in England, he played 44 international matches for Trinidad and Tobago, scoring four goals.

Forging his career with local club Port Vale, he earned worldwide recognition by playing at the 2006 FIFA World Cup for Trinidad and Tobago – the country of his mother's birth. His exploits led to a move up the leagues to Coventry City later that year. After short loan spells with Scottish side St Mirren and Carlisle United, he moved on to Brighton & Hove Albion. In 2009, he moved to the US to sign with MLS club LA Galaxy. Whilst with the Galaxy, the club were crowned Major League Soccer Western Conference champions in 2009 and 2011, and also captured a Supporters' Shield and MLS Cup double in 2011. He joined Columbus Crew for six months in May 2012. He rejoined Port Vale in January 2013 and helped the club to secure promotion out of League Two in 2012–13. He dropped into non-League in September 2016 by joining Kidsgrove Athletic.

== Club career ==
=== Port Vale ===
Birchall attended Alleyne's High School in Stone, Staffordshire, and started his career with Port Vale, having been associated with the Burslem based club since the age of nine. He made his debut under Brian Horton on 12 September 2001, replacing Neil Brisco 79 minutes into a 2–0 Second round exit of the League Cup at Charlton Athletic's The Valley stadium. On 20 April 2002, he made his league debut, again replacing Brisco, this time in a 1–0 defeat by Brighton at Vale Park.

"I came up through the ranks at Port Vale from the age of 8 until I left the club at 22. I owe all the coaching to them, they nurtured me and really looked after me and had confidence in me."

— Birchall in an interview with socawarriors.net in July 2010.

He made two Second Division appearances in 2002–03, both away defeats. The teenager earned his first start on 18 October 2003; he was taken off at half-time for Ian Armstrong, as he watched his teammates lose 5–1 at home to Plymouth Argyle. He also played in both games of the club's First round FA Cup struggle over minnows Ford United. In all, he made 13 appearances in 2003–04. Throughout the 2004–05 campaign, Birchall showed his potential, scoring seven goals in 39 games. His first senior goal was a 76th-minute winner against Swindon Town on 19 October. He also scored a brace against Tranmere Rovers on 7 December in a 3–1 home win. At the end of the season he was voted the Young Player of the Year. Birchall scored twice in 32 appearances in the 2005–06 season. However, one of them, a 22nd-minute winner over Bristol Rovers in the FA Cup, was enough to book the Vale a Third round encounter with Doncaster Rovers, which left the club one win away from a lucrative encounter with Aston Villa at Villa Park.

=== Coventry City ===
In July 2006, with the World Cup still in progress, Martin Foyle denied reports that his young midfielder would be exiting Vale Park, specifically for Ipswich Town. The next month Birchall was snapped up by Micky Adams' Coventry City for a fee of £300,000 (rising to £325,000 with bonuses), signing a three-year deal with the "Sky Blues". He scored his first "Sky Blues" goal against Norwich City with a 20-yard (18 m) low drive. He made 28 appearances in the second tier that season.

In August 2007, Birchall signed with St Mirren on loan until January 2008. However, he returned to Coventry in early December, after suffering a hamstring injury. He only played just two games for the "Sky Blues" following his return. Not a part of Chris Coleman's plans for 2008–09, John Ward of Carlisle United expressed an interest in August 2008, and had admitted speaking to the player's agent. He had also been linked with a return on loan to his former club, Port Vale. In November, Birchall signed for Carlisle on loan until the end of the year, having taken advice from teammate Keiren Westwood. When returning to Coventry, he agreed to have his contract terminated by mutual consent. The midfielder also opted not to return to Carlisle after negotiations with an unnamed American club.

=== Brighton & Hove Albion ===
In January 2009, Birchall joined League One side Brighton & Hove Albion on an initial week-trial to earn a contract. He later signed a contract until the end of the season, teaming up with his old Coventry boss Micky Adams. Three months later Brighton chairman Dick Knight blocked a move to Major League Soccer club LA Galaxy, telling Birchall he would not be allowed to leave the club on a free transfer. Despite this setback, Birchall seemed set on a move to the American franchise. He was freed from Brighton in May 2009 – along with 13 other professionals. Later that month Birchall agreed a four-year contract with the LA Galaxy.

=== LA Galaxy ===
He made his official MLS debut on 16 July 2009, replacing David Beckham as a substitute 70 minutes into a game against the New York Red Bulls. He played a further eight games for Bruce Arena's side in 2009, as Galaxy topped the Conference, only to lose the MLS Cup final after a penalty shoot-out defeat to Real Salt Lake. Birchall started the game but was substituted in the 79th minute for Chris Klein. He made 25 appearances in 2010, helping his team to again top the Western Conference table. He then played in the Conference finals, where Galaxy were defeated by FC Dallas. He also played in the CONCACAF Champions League, as Galaxy were knocked out at the preliminary stage after losing to the Puerto Rico Islanders at The Home Depot Center.

Birchall scored his first MLS season goal against Toronto FC on 11 June 2011 in the second minute of the game; he was assisted by Miguel Pedro López. During the off-season, he returned to Vale Park for fitness training. He did not rule out a return to Port Vale in the future, though admitted that he was enjoying himself in LA, having made friends with Landon Donovan, David Beckham and Robbie Williams. Galaxy won a treble in 2011, being crowned Supporters' Shield and Conference champions, as well as MLS Cup winners. Birchall came off the bench in the cup final, replacing Adam Cristman on 57 minutes, as Galaxy beat Houston Dynamo 1–0 thanks to a Landon Donovan goal.

On 23 January 2012, Arena stated, "There hasn't been a decision made on him [Birchall]. Originally he wanted [to] go back to England, so we obviously agreed to that and didn't renew his option. He was looking to explore opportunities in England. Perhaps he'll want to come back." He then returned to Burslem to train with Port Vale, and also raised the possibility of playing for the cash-stricken club for free whilst he weighed up his options elsewhere; he said he intended to do this as he owed his career to both the club and to the manager, Micky Adams. Adams said that he was hopeful of bringing Birchall back to Vale Park but said that "I smiled to myself when I saw he was playing for free, because you don't get anything for free in football." Birchall was due to sign a month-to-month contract with the club in February 2012, having turned out in a reserve team game. However, the club were hit with a transfer embargo by the Football League before any contract was signed. At the end of March, he was reported to have signed with Northwich Victoria of the Northern Premier League Premier Division, who were managed by Martin Foyle, his former manager at Vale; however, Birchall denied the story on his Twitter account.

=== Columbus Crew ===
He elected to stay in the MLS in May 2012, after signing an unspecified "multi-year contract" with the Columbus Crew. Columbus Crew community fan-site Massive Report stated that "Birchall's performances were notable for their high energy, but consistent lack of polish as he tended to cede possession quite a bit" and also reported that the player was "unhappy with his lack of playing time during a September stretch where he didn't see the field for three straight games". Head coach Robert Warzycha elected to decline his contract option in December 2012.

=== Return to Port Vale ===
On 3 January 2013, after a month of training at Vale Park, Birchall signed a contract at former club Port Vale lasting until the end of the 2012–13 season. As well representing a return to his first club, it was also the third time that he would be signed by manager Micky Adams. He scored his first goal of his second spell on 5 April with a 25-yard shot in a 7–1 win over promotion rivals Burton Albion. Vale were promoted at the end of the season, and Birchall agreed to a new one-year contract in the summer.

Birchall remained an important first-team player during the 2013–14 season and made 17 starts and 15 substitute appearances as the club posted a ninth-place finish in League One. He signed a new one-year contract in the summer.

He started the 2014–15 season on the right side of midfield after impressing in pre-season training. He ended the campaign with three goals in 30 appearances and signed a new one-year contract in June 2015. However, Birchall was not happy with the contract, claiming he turned down better offers to stay at the club and that his loyalty was being taken advantage of.

After some impressive performances for the Reserves he made his first start of the 2015–16 season on 3 October, taking the place of Byron Moore as manager Rob Page felt he needed a more defensive-minded player to combat Southend United's attacking left-back Ben Coker. He remained in first-team contention until picking up a knee injury just before the new year; the injury required surgery and ruled him out of action for six weeks.

=== Non-League ===
Having left Port Vale at the end of the 2015–16 season, Birchall had a trial at Northampton Town in July 2016, who were managed by former Vale boss Rob Page. Two months later he signed with Northern Premier League Division One South side Kidsgrove Athletic. He scored four goals before he left the club in January 2017 due to high wages at that level. Manager Ryan Austin said that "I understand that and we have parted on good terms".

== International career ==
Although born in England, Birchall represented Trinidad and Tobago internationally. He was eligible due to his mother being born in Port of Spain.

Birchall's agent was spreading the word that he could play for his mother's homeland. He was first made aware of the interest in him by Trinidad and Tobago international centre back Dennis Lawrence, who walked over to him during a game between Port Vale and Wrexham (Lawrence's club at the time). Lawrence inquired if he was indeed eligible to play for the "Soca Warriors" by saying "I hear you've got some 'Trini' blood in you?". Lawrence then passed Birchall's contact details onto the Trinidad and Tobago Football Association, and Birchall was called up to the full Trinidad and Tobago squad for the World Cup qualifiers against Panama and Mexico, following a couple of friendlies against Bermuda. After making his debut for the national side, it was widely reported that Birchall was the first white player to represent the country in sixty years. However, former Trinidad coach Stephen Hart is white and represented Trinidad & Tobago in 1980. The "Prince of Port-of-Spain", West Indies cricketer Brian Lara, was also credited for helping the TTFA hear about Birchall after Ashley Giles commented on having some West Indian blood in his family. When the press in Trinidad and Tobago asked why he qualified to play for them, he replied, "Me mum". This memorable response gave rise to his "Soca Warrior" nickname, 'Me Mum'.

"At the time he joined the team he was the odd guy out but we all welcome him with open arms and he's been very much a key player to our team. He's come in and done a fantastic job and has become an influential player.

— Fellow countryman Dwight Yorke on Birchall.

Undoubtedly his most important contribution to the "Soca Warriors" came on 12 November 2005, in their home (first) leg of their 2006 FIFA World Cup qualifying play-off against Bahrain. Bahrain's Salman Isa had scored in the 72nd minute and were poised to take a 1–0 lead back home for the second leg, but five minutes later, Birchall fired in a stunning goal from well outside the penalty area to equalize. The "Soca Warriors" went on to win the return leg of the play-off in Bahrain 1–0 (on a goal from Lawrence) and advance to their first-ever World Cup finals. Along with goalkeeper Shaka Hislop, Birchall was the only member of the World Cup squad to have been born in England, with the remaining members all having been born and raised in Trinidad and Tobago.

Following their return from the 2006 World Cup, each member of the Trinidad and Tobago national team was awarded the country's second-highest honour, the Chaconia Medal in gold, plus TT$1,000,000 (about £87,500 (one quarter in cash, the rest in unit trusts). He is therefore entitled to suffix his name "C.M." if he wishes. "Soca Warrior" fans have also penned a rap song in his honour.

He fell out of the first-team picture in November 2011 before earning a recall under new boss Hutson Charles in March 2013. However, he considered his retirement from the international scene in July 2013, having featured on the bench in the CONCACAF Gold Cup.

"Never did I think I would be accepted in the manner I was, the support I have received over the years has been phenomenal and I think it was made easier due to my fighting spirit and hard attitude on the pitch. It is hard to call it a day but if I have left just one historic memory with the fans then I have achieved much more than I ever dreamed imaginable with the team. I have always tried to give 100 per cent on the pitch, give my all for the nation whenever called upon and wear the shirt with pride as I knew how many people would die for my opportunity."

— Birchall announced his retirement from international football in August 2013.

== Personal and later life ==
In 2006, Birchall and Stoke City star Andy Wilkinson invested £200,000 into Zenn Club, a nightclub in Hanley, Stoke-on-Trent. However, in July 2008, the club closed due to debts. The club later re-opened under new management. In July 2007, it was reported that Birchall had been dating media personality Jodie Marsh for a brief time. His then-partner, Lucy Mulroy, gave birth to a son, Ashley Edward Birchall, on 28 April 2009. Birchall attended Staffordshire University and graduated with a Professional Sports Writing & Broadcasting degree in 2016. He opened a football academy in Wolstanton in May 2021, with an emphasis on getting the children to enjoy the game and have fun rather than training hard. He began training to become a referee in 2024. He accepted a three-year fast-track deal with the PGMOL.

== Career statistics ==
=== Club ===
Appearances and goals by club, season and competition
Club	Season	League			National cup (Note: Includes FA Cup, U.S. Open Cup)		League cup (Note: Includes Football League Cup)		Other		Total	
Club	Season	Division	Apps	Goals	Apps	Goals	Apps	Goals	Apps	Goals	Apps	Goals
Port Vale	2001–02	Second Division	1	0	0	0	1	0	0	0	2	0
Port Vale	2002–03	Second Division	2	0	0	0	0	0	0	0	2	0
Port Vale	2003–04	Second Division	10	0	3	0	0	0	0	0	13	0
Port Vale	2004–05	League One	34	6	2	0	1	0	2 (Note: Appearance(s) in the Football League Trophy.)	1	39	7
Port Vale	2005–06	League One	31	1	3	1	1	0	0	0	35	2
Port Vale	Total		78	7	8	1	3	0	2	1	91	9
Coventry City	2006–07	Championship	28	2	1	0	1	0	—		30	2
Coventry City	2007–08	Championship	1	0	1	0	1	0	—		3	0
Coventry City	2008–09	Championship	0	0	0	0	0	0	—		0	0
Coventry City	Total		29	2	2	0	2	0	0	0	33	2
St Mirren (loan)	2007–08	SPL	9	0	0	0	0	0	0	0	9	0
Carlisle United (loan)	2008–09	League One	2	0	0	0	—		—		2	0
Brighton & Hove Albion	2008–09	League One	9	0	—		—		1	0	10	0
LA Galaxy	2009	Major League Soccer	11	0	—		—		—		11	0
LA Galaxy	2010	Major League Soccer	28	0	1	0	—		1 (Note: Appearance(s) in the CONCACAF Champions League.)	0	30	0
LA Galaxy	2011	Major League Soccer	27	1	1	0	—		4	0	32	1
LA Galaxy	Total		66	1	2	0	—		5	0	73	1
Columbus Crew	2012	Major League Soccer	18	1	1	0	—		—		19	1
Port Vale	2012–13	League Two	11	1	—		—		—		11	1
Port Vale	2013–14	League One	27	1	3	1	0	0	2	0	32	2
Port Vale	2014–15	League One	27	3	1	0	1	0	1	0	30	3
Port Vale	2015–16	League One	10	2	1	0	0	0	1	0	12	2
Port Vale	Total		75	7	5	1	1	0	4	0	85	8
Career total (Note: Statistics for Kidsgrove Athletic not recorded.)			286	18	18	2	6	0	12	1	322	21

=== International ===
Appearances and goals by national team and year
National team	Year	Apps	Goals
Trinidad and Tobago	2005	14	2
Trinidad and Tobago	2006	11	2
Trinidad and Tobago	2007	0	0
Trinidad and Tobago	2008	6	0
Trinidad and Tobago	2009	5	0
Trinidad and Tobago	2010	0	0
Trinidad and Tobago	2011	3	0
Trinidad and Tobago	2012	0	0
Trinidad and Tobago	2013	5	0
Total		44	4

== Honours ==
LA Galaxy

- MLS Cup: 2011
- Major League Soccer Supporters' Shield: 2010, 2011
- Major League Soccer Western Conference Championship: 2009, 2011

Port Vale

- Football League Two third-place promotion: 2012–13

Individual

- Chaconia Medal Gold Class: 2006
