= Billy Paynter =

English footballer (born 1984)

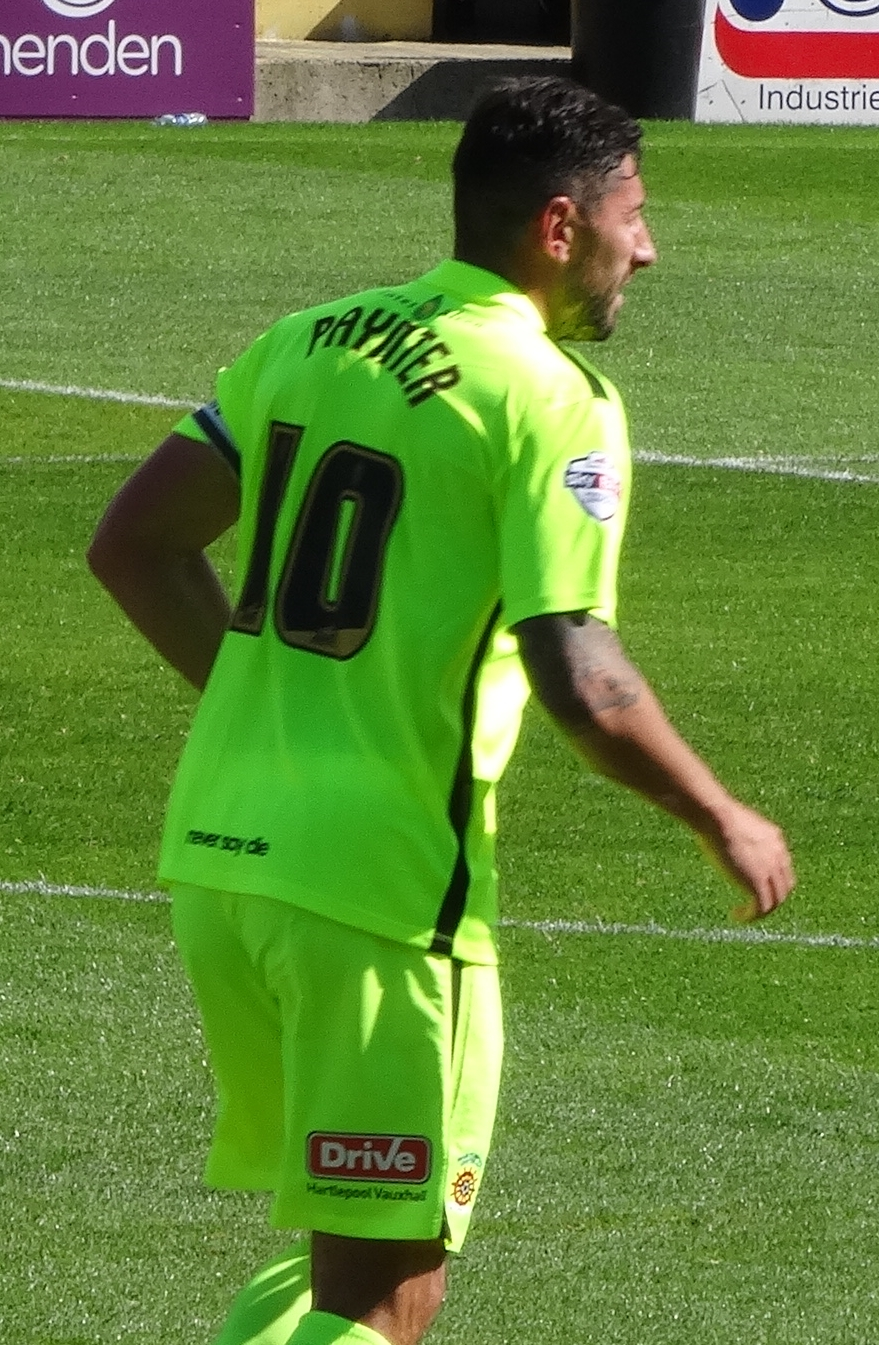
- Paynter playing for Hartlepool United in 2015

Personal information
- Full name: William Paul Paynter
- Date of birth: 13 July 1984 (age 42)
- Place of birth: Liverpool, England
- Height: 6 ft 0 in (1.83 m)
- Position: Striker

Youth career
- 1994–2000: Port Vale

Senior career*
| Years | Team | Apps | (Gls) |
| 2000–2006 | Port Vale | 144 | (30) |
| 2005–2006 | → Hull City (loan) | 9 | (3) |
| 2006 | Hull City | 13 | (0) |
| 2006 | → Southend United (loan) | 1 | (0) |
| 2006–2007 | Southend United | 8 | (0) |
| 2007 | → Bradford City (loan) | 15 | (4) |
| 2007–2010 | Swindon Town | 122 | (45) |
| 2010–2012 | Leeds United | 27 | (3) |
| 2011–2012 | → Brighton & Hove Albion (loan) | 10 | (0) |
| 2012–2014 | Doncaster Rovers | 46 | (13) |
| 2014 | → Sheffield United (loan) | 13 | (0) |
| 2014–2015 | Carlisle United | 18 | (1) |
| 2015–2017 | Hartlepool United | 53 | (17) |
| 2017 | Warrington Town | 1 | (0) |
| Total | | 481 | (116) |

International career
| 2006 | Football League England U21 | 1 | (0) |

Managerial career
- 2023–2024: Runcorn Linnets
- 2024–2025: Connah's Quay Nomads
- * Club domestic league appearances and goals

William Paul Paynter (born 13 July 1984) is an English football manager and former football player and manager. In a 17-year professional career in the English Football League, he played as a striker and scored 131 goals in 532 league and cup appearances.

Born in Liverpool, Paynter started his career with Port Vale in 2000 and made over 150 appearances in his six years with the club, being voted Player of the Year in 2005. He was sold to Hull City in January 2006 before moving on to Southend United eight months later. His career stalled, and following a loan spell with Bradford City, he moved on to Swindon Town in August 2007. Averaging more than a goal every three games with the club, he transferred to Leeds United in June 2010. He joined Brighton & Hove Albion on loan in October 2011 before taking a free transfer to Doncaster Rovers in August 2012. He helped Rovers to win the League One title in 2012–13. He was loaned to Sheffield United in January 2014. He signed with Carlisle United in June 2014, moving on to Hartlepool United twelve months later. He dropped into non-League football for a brief spell with Warrington Town in November 2017.

After retiring as a player, he moved into coach and has coached at the academies at Everton, RIASA, and Port Vale. He was appointed first-team manager at Runcorn Linnets in March 2023 and stepped down in May 2024. He took charge at Connah's Quay Nomads in August 2024 but was relieved of his duties eight months later.

== Club career ==
=== Port Vale ===
Paynter started his career at Port Vale after being scouted in his native Liverpool at the age of ten. He signed professional forms in 2000, and manager Brian Horton gave Paynter his debut against Walsall at Vale Park on 3 May 2001. At only 16 years and 294 days old, he was the youngest Vale player for twenty years.

Horton went on to give the young striker seven further Second Division games in the 2001–02 season. He scored his first senior goal past Notts County on 17 September 2002, making him the club's youngest goalscorer for 24 years. By the end of the season, he had scored five goals in 34 appearances. Still a teenager during the 2003–04 season, he hit 14 goals in 48 games despite being played mostly on the right wing, leaving him second in the club's scoring charts behind the prolific Stephen McPhee. He was rewarded with a long-term contract at the season's end, as well as the club's Young Player of the Year award.

He opened the 2004–05 season by being sent off for over celebrating after scoring Vale's first goal in a 3–2 defeat at Walsall on 7 August; he went on to criticize referee Lee Probert for ruining the game with the red card decision. He went on to end the campaign as the club's top-scorer with 13 goals in fifty games; this came despite criticism from some supporters for a mini-goal drought in mid-season. In March, manager Martin Foyle dismissed rumours of Paynter moving to nearby Crewe Alexandra. At the end of the season, fans voted Paynter as the club's Player of the Year. He started the 2005–06 season with just two goals in 16 League One games, but had still done enough in his Port Vale career to justify a move into Championship football. The club reported Tony Pulis' Plymouth Argyle to The Football Association for an alleged illegal approach for the player, but accepted a bid from Hull City.

=== Hull City ===
In November 2005, Hull City manager Peter Taylor signed Paynter on loan, then later negotiated a permanent transfer for an initial fee of £150,000 (with a further £75,000 based on appearance) in the January transfer window. He signed a two-and-a-half-year deal. Teammate Sam Collins also moved to Hull at the same time. Again, Paynter mainly played as a striker but also made some appearances as a right midfielder. He fell behind Jon Parkin in the pecking order. He scored three times in his 23 appearances before moving on again at the end of the season.

=== Southend ===
Paynter joined Southend United on a three-year contract on 7 August 2006 for an undisclosed fee, although he actually joined the Shrimpers a few days earlier on loan, to enable him to play in their match against Stoke City. Paynter scored his first and what turned out to be only Southend goal in a 3–2 League Cup victory over Brighton, but lost his place in the first-team due to a lack of goals. Paynter's stay at Southend was brief, interrupted by a hamstring injury, and on the last day of the January transfer window of the 2006–07 season he was loaned out to Bradford City for a month, having made just eleven appearances for Southend.

Paynter made his debut for Bradford City against Nottingham Forest on 3 February 2007, scoring a last-minute equaliser to earn the Bantams a 2–2 draw. He played 15 times for Bradford, scoring four goals, after his loan was extended to the end of the season.

=== Swindon Town ===
In August 2007, Paynter signed for Swindon Town on transfer deadline day on a three-year contract. He made his debut on 9 September, coming on as a substitute in a televised defeat against Yeovil. He hit a hat-trick against AFC Bournemouth on 22 September, his first game at the County Ground. He followed this up with a brace against Gillingham in a 5–0 win on 6 October, as a strong partnership with loan signing Simon Cox began to develop. Following Paul Sturrock's departure, caretaker managers David Byrne and Maurice Malpas dropped him over concerns that he had lost confidence following a run of one goal scored in nine games. He was soon returned to the starting line-up after Bradley Orr picked up a suspension. In January, he scored a goal and an own goal in an FA Cup replay with Barnet, before he was sent off in a League One game with Crewe Alexandara for an elbow on Michael O'Connor. He was sent off again in March for a deliberate handball against Huddersfield Town and ended the 2007–08 season with ten goals in forty games.

Paynter made 42 league starts in the following 2008–09 season for Swindon, scoring eleven goals and providing vital support for the league's joint top-scorer Simon Cox. His strong play was a good foil for the pace and intelligent running shown by Cox. However, another sending off against Crewe Alexandra tarnished his reputation for new manager Danny Wilson. He did though regain his first-team spot after Barry Corr picked up an injury in January.

Cox was sold to West Bromwich Albion in the summer of 2009, and Paynter was given a more prominent role in attack due to his departure. He netted 15 goals in a 17-match run from the end of November through to April. Paynter was named as the League One Player of the Month for January – an award he was also nominated for again in March. At this point, Paynter also entered negotiations over a new contract with Swindon. On 3 April 2010, Paynter scored a brace for Swindon in their 3–0 rout of Leeds United at Elland Road – the win gave Swindon some hope of achieving automatic promotion. He had also previously scored twice against Leeds that season in a 3–0 win at the County Ground. Swindon reached the League One play-offs, and won their play-off semi-final after beating Charlton Athletic on penalties – Paynter had missed the first leg through injury, but returned for the second leg which saw Swindon edge into the final at Wembley. He overcame a slight injury doubt and managed to play from the start in Swindon's 1–0 defeat to Millwall, with Paynter being replaced late in the second half. During the 2009–10 season, Paynter also managed to form a formidable strike partnership with fellow striker Charlie Austin, as the pair scored a total of 49 goals between them. In total Paynter scored 29 goals for Swindon during the 2009–10 season, representing his best goal scoring ratio in a single season. He was named as League One Player of the Month for January 2010.

=== Leeds United ===
In June 2010, after turning down a new deal at Swindon Town, Paynter accepted a three-year deal with newly promoted Leeds United. In late July however, it was reported that Paynter would be ruled out for two months after suffering a stress fracture of the shin that he had picked up during Leeds' pre-season schedule. The injury ruled him out of the rest of the pre-season, with manager Simon Grayson suggesting that the club could not provide timescales for Paynter's recovery from the injury. Paynter finally returned to training at the start of September, and played 90 minutes in a behind closed doors friendly, however, Paynter later suffered a reaction to his injury, keeping him out of action longer than had been expected.

Having finally returned to fitness and having appeared for Leeds' reserve team, Paynter finally made his first-team debut on 10 October 2010, as a second-half substitute in a 4–1 defeat of Scunthorpe United. Paynter eventually scored his first goal for Leeds in a 2–1 win at Preston North End on 8 March. Paynter had a disappointing first season with Leeds, scoring just once in 23 games, and was linked with a move to Yorkshire rivals Sheffield United during the following the summer.

Having remained at Leeds despite interest from elsewhere, Paynter came on as a substitute for Leeds on the opening day of the 2011–12 season as they suffered a 3–1 defeat against Southampton. Paynter was unable to establish himself in the Leeds first-team however, as he picked up another injury, sidelining him for a further spell. At the end of August, Paynter was permitted to speak with Brighton & Hove Albion regarding a move to the club. However, he decided to stay at Leeds and fight for his place in the team. With Luciano Becchio returning from injury and the signing of Mikael Forssell, Paynter's playing opportunities diminished further, and manager Simon Grayson hinted that he would allow Paynter to go out on loan.

Having not played since the season's opening day for Leeds in October 2011, reports circulated that several Championship clubs were interested in taking Paynter on loan. but Leeds insisted they would not loan him to a rival club in the same division, and were currently considering an offer from an unnamed League One side. On 27 October 2011, Paynter signed for Brighton & Hove Albion on loan until the start of January 2012. He made his debut for the club on 29 October, as a second-half substitute against Birmingham City. He played a total of ten games for Brighton without scoring before he returned to Elland Road.

Paynter finally made his first start of the season for Leeds, and his first start under new manager Neil Warnock in mid-April 2012, coming into the side against Peterborough United, scoring twice in a 4–1 home win. He was given a second consecutive start in the following game against Blackpool, however, he picked up an Achilles injury in the game which ended his season prematurely. Neil Warnock subsequently placed Paynter on the transfer list at the end of the 2011–12 season.

Doncaster Rovers boss Dean Saunders was strongly linked with a move for the striker at the end of July. However, Paynter instead joined Blackpool for a week-long trial. The trial was cut short after a few days. He began training with Doncaster Rovers. When Leeds issued their squad numbers for the 2012–13 season on 3 August, it was revealed that Paynter, previously the club's number nine, had not been allocated a number.

=== Doncaster Rovers ===
Following a trial spell, Paynter completed a free transfer to League One side Doncaster Rovers on 13 August 2012, signing a two-year contract. Paynter scored 13 goals in 40 games during the 2012–13 campaign, and on the last day of the season he provided the pass to James Coppinger which was converted for the late winning goal over Brentford that won Doncaster promotion to the Championship as champions of League One.

On 10 January 2014, Paynter signed on loan for Sheffield United. He spent most of his time on the bench as Nigel Clough chose to use Jose Baxter as a false number nine in a highly successful run that took the club up the table and into the semi-finals of the FA Cup. played 13 games for the "Blades" in the second half of the 2013–14 campaign, without scoring a goal. He was released by Doncaster manager Paul Dickov in May 2014.

=== Carlisle United ===
Paynter signed a two-year contract with newly-relegated League Two club Carlisle United in June 2014. It was reported that he decided to reject higher paid offers from clubs in higher divisions in join the "Cumbrians" after being convinced to come to Brunton Park by manager Graham Kavanagh. However, Carlisle struggled during the 2014–15 season, and after being fined by new manager Keith Curle for refusing to take part in extra training sessions put on for players not in the first-team, both Paynter and Gary Dicker took representation from the Professional Footballers' Association to dispute the legality of their fines. He was transfer listed by Curle in May 2015.

=== Hartlepool United ===
Paynter had his contract with Carlisle United cancelled by mutual consent and joined League Two rivals Hartlepool United on 27 June 2015. He was appointed as club captain by manager Ronnie Moore. He made his debut in the 2–0 win over Morecambe in the first game of the 2015–16 season, scoring the opening goal and providing an assist for Rakish Bingham. Three days later, Paynter scored in his second game to help Hartlepool beat Fleetwood Town 1–0 in the first round of the League Cup. His total of 15 goals in 35 appearances in the 2015–16 season made him the club's top-scorer and caused new manager Craig Hignett to exercise a contract clause to keep Paynter at the club for another year. He was out injured in January with an Achilles problem, and underwent surgery to correct the issue two months later. Hartlepool were relegated into non-League at the end of the 2016–17 season, and Paynter admitted that he did not know what manager Dave Jones had been doing with his tactics. Paynter was one of three men – along with Stuart Parnaby and Ian Gallagher – tasked with assisting caretaker manager Matthew Bates for the final two games of the season, which ended in a defeat and a victory, but ultimately relegation. Paynter was released in May 2017.

=== Warrington Town ===
On 26 November 2017, Paynter signed with Northern Premier League Premier Division club Warrington Town. He had previously been training with AFC Fylde and Southport. However, he announced his retirement from football the following month.

== International career ==
Paynter played for a Football League England U21 team (selected and managed by Peter Taylor) in a game against an Under-21 Italy squad containing players from Serie B side's, a match which took place at the KC Stadium in February 2006. Paynter played as a right-midfielder.

== Coaching career ==
Paynter was appointed as an academy football coach at Everton in February 2018 and also spent six months as a coach at RIASA. He returned to former club Port Vale as the academy's professional development phase lead coach in October 2020. Interim manager Danny Pugh had to start self-isolation after testing positive for COVID-19 on 18 January 2021, leaving Paynter, Frank Sinclair and Anthony Griffith to take over first-team duties in his absence. New manager Darrell Clarke kept Paynter on as an assistant in the first-team. He left the club in May 2022.

=== Runcorn Linnets ===
He joined the coaching staff at Northern Premier League Division One West side Runcorn Linnets the following month from his Port Vale departure. On 31 March 2023, Runcorn Linnets sacked manager Dave Wild and appointed Paynter as his replacement. In May 2023, he was given a new two-year contract as manager. He announced his resignation on 3 May 2024 following their play-off semi-final defeat to City of Liverpool. Chairman Peter Cartledge said that "the achievement of finishing second in in[sic] Northern Premier League West Division should not be underestimated or go without high praise".

=== Connah's Quay Nomads ===
On 24 August 2024, Paynter was appointed manager of Cymru Premier side Connah's Quay Nomads, following the resignation of previous manager Neil Gibson. Paynter was one of 25 applicants for the role, and was one of six shortlisted for interview. On 13 April 2025, he was sacked after the club failed to reach the play-offs despite reaching the final of the Welsh Cup.

Paynter joined the Crewe Alexandra Academy as a Youth Phase Coach in October 2025.

== Personal life ==
Paynter was born in the Norris Green area of Liverpool, moving to Litherland during his early childhood, and is a keen fan of boxing.

== Career statistics ==
Appearances and goals by club, season and competition
| Club | Season | League | | | FA Cup | | EFL Cup | | Other | | Total | |
| Club | Season | Division | Apps | Goals | Apps | Goals | Apps | Goals | Apps | Goals | Apps | Goals |
|---|---|---|---|---|---|---|---|---|---|---|---|---|
| Port Vale | 2000–01 | Second Division | 1 | 0 | 0 | 0 | 0 | 0 | 0 | 0 | 1 | 0 |
| Port Vale | 2001–02 | Second Division | 7 | 0 | 1 | 0 | 0 | 0 | 0 | 0 | 8 | 0 |
| Port Vale | 2002–03 | Second Division | 31 | 5 | 1 | 0 | 0 | 0 | 2 (Note: Appearance(s) in the Football League Trophy) | 0 | 34 | 5 |
| Port Vale | 2003–04 | Second Division | 44 | 13 | 2 | 1 | 1 | 0 | 1 | 0 | 48 | 14 |
| Port Vale | 2004–05 | League One | 45 | 10 | 2 | 2 | 1 | 0 | 2 | 1 | 50 | 13 |
| Port Vale | 2005–06 | League One | 16 | 2 | 0 | 0 | 1 | 0 | 0 | 0 | 17 | 2 |
| Port Vale | Total | | 144 | 30 | 6 | 3 | 3 | 0 | 5 | 1 | 158 | 34 |
| Hull City | 2005–06 | Championship | 22 | 3 | 1 | 0 | 0 | 0 | — | | 23 | 3 |
| Southend United | 2006–07 | Championship | 9 | 0 | 0 | 0 | 2 | 1 | — | | 11 | 1 |
| Bradford City (loan) | 2006–07 | League One | 15 | 4 | — | | — | | — | | 15 | 4 |
| Swindon Town | 2007–08 | League One | 36 | 8 | 4 | 2 | — | | 0 | 0 | 40 | 10 |
| Swindon Town | 2008–09 | League One | 42 | 11 | 1 | 0 | 1 | 1 | 3 | 0 | 47 | 12 |
| Swindon Town | 2009–10 | League One | 44 | 26 | 3 | 1 | 2 | 2 | 3 | 0 | 52 | 29 |
| Swindon Town | Total | | 122 | 45 | 8 | 3 | 3 | 3 | 6 | 0 | 139 | 51 |
| Leeds United | 2010–11 | Championship | 22 | 1 | 1 | 0 | 0 | 0 | — | | 23 | 1 |
| Leeds United | 2011–12 | Championship | 5 | 2 | 0 | 0 | 0 | 0 | — | | 5 | 2 |
| Leeds United | Total | | 27 | 3 | 1 | 0 | 0 | 0 | 0 | 0 | 28 | 3 |
| Brighton & Hove Albion (loan) | 2011–12 | Championship | 10 | 0 | 0 | 0 | — | | — | | 10 | 0 |
| Doncaster Rovers | 2012–13 | League One | 37 | 13 | 1 | 0 | 1 | 0 | 1 | 0 | 40 | 13 |
| Doncaster Rovers | 2013–14 | Championship | 9 | 0 | 1 | 0 | 2 | 1 | 0 | 0 | 12 | 1 |
| Doncaster Rovers | Total | | 46 | 13 | 2 | 0 | 3 | 1 | 1 | 0 | 52 | 14 |
| Sheffield United (loan) | 2013–14 | League One | 13 | 0 | 0 | 0 | — | | — | | 13 | 0 |
| Carlisle United | 2014–15 | League Two | 18 | 1 | 0 | 0 | 1 | 0 | 2 | 1 | 21 | 2 |
| Hartlepool United | 2015–16 | League Two | 32 | 14 | 1 | 0 | 2 | 1 | 0 | 0 | 35 | 15 |
| Hartlepool United | 2016–17 | League Two | 21 | 3 | 2 | 1 | 0 | 0 | 3 (Note: Appearance(s) in the EFL Trophy) | 0 | 26 | 4 |
| Hartlepool United | Total | | 53 | 17 | 3 | 1 | 2 | 1 | 3 | 0 | 61 | 19 |
| Warrington Town | 2017–18 | Northern Premier League | 1 | 0 | 0 | 0 | 0 | 0 | 0 | 0 | 1 | 0 |
| Career total | | | 480 | 116 | 21 | 7 | 14 | 6 | 17 | 2 | 532 | 131 |

== Managerial statistics ==
Managerial record by team and tenure
| Team | From | To | Record | | | | | Ref. |
| Team | From | To | P | W | D | L | Win % | Ref. |
|---|---|---|---|---|---|---|---|---|
| Runcorn Linnets | 31 March 2023 | 3 May 2024 | 58 | 28 | 14 | 16 | 48.3 | |
| Connah's Quay Nomads | 24 August 2024 | 13 April 2025 | 36 | 18 | 4 | 14 | 50.0 | |
| Total | | | 94 | 46 | 18 | 30 | 48.9 | — |

== Honours ==
Doncaster Rovers

- Football League One: 2012–13

Individual

- Port Vale Player of the Year: 2004–05
- Football League One Player of the Month: January 2010
