= Steve Rowland (footballer) =

Welsh footballer

Personal information
- Full name: Stephen John Rowland
- Date of birth: 2 November 1981 (age 44)
- Place of birth: Wrexham, Wales
- Height: 5 ft 10 in (1.78 m)
- Position: Defender

Youth career
- Port Vale

Senior career*
| Years | Team | Apps | (Gls) |
| 2001–2006 | Port Vale | 121 | (1) |
| 2006–2007 | Southport | 34 | (0) |
| 2008–2009 | Colwyn Bay | ? | (?) |
| 2009–2010 | Gresford Athletic | ? | (?) |
| 2010–201? | Caersws | 15 | (0) |
| Total | | 170+ | (1+) |
- * Club domestic league appearances and goals

Stephen John Rowland (born 2 November 1981) is a Welsh former football defender.

Playing for English side Port Vale between 2001 and 2006, he made 136 appearances. He then spent a season with Southport before heading into Welsh football with Colwyn Bay and then Gresford Athletic. In 2010, he signed for Welsh Premier League side Caersws.

== Career ==
Rowland started with career rising through the Port Vale junior ranks to sign professionally with the club for the start of the 2001–02 season. He scored his first – and only – senior goal on 29 December, in a 3–1 win over Colchester United at Vale Park, and finished the campaign with 29 appearances to his name. He made 25 Second Division appearances in 2002–03, as manager Brian Horton signed more competition in the form of Sam Collins and Ian Brightwell. He featured 30 times in 2003–04, as new signings George Pilkington and Andreas Lipa went ahead of Rowland in the pecking order. He played 26 times for new manager Martin Foyle in 2004–05; the "Valiants" had an extremely unsettled defence, with 13 defenders making appearances throughout the League One campaign. He played 24 times in 2005–06, and was released at the end of the campaign.

In August 2006 he signed with Conference National side Southport, making 34 league appearances in the 2006–07 season, before departing in April 2007. The club were relegated into the Conference North. He signed with Northern Premier League side Colwyn Bay in January 2008. In January 2010, Rowland joined Welsh Premier League side Caersws from Cymru Alliance club Gresford Athletic. He made 15 appearances for the club, but could do little to prevent the club finishing a full 28 points short of safety.

== Career statistics ==
Appearances and goals by club, season and competition
| Club | Season | League | | | National cup (Note: Includes FA Cup, Welsh Cup) | | League cup (Note: Includes Football League Cup, Welsh League Cup) | | Other | | Total | |
| Club | Season | Division | Apps | Goals | Apps | Goals | Apps | Goals | Apps | Goals | Apps | Goals |
|---|---|---|---|---|---|---|---|---|---|---|---|---|
| Port Vale | 2001–02 | Second Division | 25 | 1 | 2 | 0 | 0 | 0 | 2 (Note: Appearance(s) in the EFL Trophy.) | 0 | 29 | 1 |
| Port Vale | 2002–03 | Second Division | 25 | 0 | 0 | 0 | 0 | 0 | 2 | 0 | 27 | 0 |
| Port Vale | 2003–04 | Second Division | 29 | 0 | 0 | 0 | 0 | 0 | 1 | 0 | 30 | 0 |
| Port Vale | 2004–05 | League One | 24 | 0 | 2 | 0 | 0 | 0 | 0 | 0 | 26 | 0 |
| Port Vale | 2005–06 | League One | 18 | 0 | 4 | 0 | 1 | 0 | 1 | 0 | 24 | 0 |
| Port Vale | Total | | 121 | 1 | 8 | 0 | 1 | 0 | 6 | 0 | 136 | 1 |
| Southport | 2006–07 | Conference National | 34 | 0 | 0 | 0 | — | | 0 | 0 | 34 | 0 |
| Caersws | 2009–10 | Welsh Premier League | 15 | 0 | 0 | 0 | 0 | 0 | 0 | 0 | 15 | 0 |
| Career total (Note: Statistics for Gresford Athletic & Colwyn Bay not recorded.) | | | 170 | 1 | 8 | 0 | 1 | 0 | 6 | 0 | 185 | 1 |
