= 2003–04 Port Vale F.C. season =

Port Vale F.C.
2003–04 season
- Owner: Valiant 2001
- Chairman: Bill Bratt
- Manager: Brian Horton (until 12 February); Martin Foyle (from 13 February)
- Stadium: Vale Park
- Football League Second Division: 7th (73 points)
- FA Cup: Second Round (eliminated by Scarborough)
- League Cup: First Round (eliminated by Nottingham Forest)
- Football League Trophy: First Round (eliminated by Scarborough)
- Player of the Year: Stephen McPhee
- Top goalscorer: League: Stephen McPhee (25); All: Stephen McPhee (27)
- Highest home attendance: 7,958 vs. Sheffield Wednesday, 7 February 2004
- Lowest home attendance: 4,016 vs. Ford United, 8 November 2003
- Average home league attendance: 5,810
- Biggest win: 5–1 vs. Grimsby Town, 17 January 2004
- Biggest defeat: 1–5 vs. Plymouth Argyle, 18 October 2003
Home colours	Away colours

The 2003–04 season was Port Vale's 92nd season of football in the English Football League and fourth-successive season (41st overall) in the Second Division. The campaign began under manager Brian Horton, but mid‑season setbacks led to his resignation in February. Martin Foyle was appointed in his place and guided the club to a seventh‑place finish with 73 points, missing out on a play‑off spot on goal difference in what was their highest league position of the era.

In cup competitions, the Valiants struggled to make a mark. They exited the League Cup at the First Round, falling to Nottingham Forest, while the FA Cup run ended in the Second Round at the hands of Conference side Scarborough. Vale also suffered elimination from the Football League Trophy in the First Round, again losing to Scarborough. On the field, Stephen McPhee was the driving force for Vale, finishing as both club top scorer (25 in the league, 27 in total) and Player of the Year, before departing at the end of the season to play abroad. Despite the relative on‑pitch success, financial fragility persisted: chairman Bill Bratt continued to seek fan-backed investment but remained adamant none would hold a controlling share (over 50%)

== Overview ==
=== Second Division ===
The pre-season saw Brian Horton bring in three key players on free transfers: George Pilkington (Everton); Jonny Brain (Newcastle United); and Austrian Andreas Lipa (Skoda Xanthi). Meanwhile, promising keeper Mark Goodlad began a lengthy period on the sidelines with injuries. Optimism surrounded the club, after the rebuilding of the new squad appeared to have finished after the break-up of the club's previous team due to financial troubles.

On 23 August, Vale recorded a 4–3 home win over Colchester United after having twice come from a goal down. On 13 September, Vale came from a goal down to record a 3–1 win over Barnsley, with Rory Fallon's eighth-minute opener cancelled out by Lipa header 15 minutes later, with Pilkington and Adrian Littlejohn goals in the second half securing all three points. The season opened with seven wins in eleven games, earning Brian Horton the Manager of the Month award. The last of these victories was a 3–0 win over Peterborough United on 30 September, with McPhee scoring two goals after being to the central striker position from out wide. Though this was followed by a sequence of five defeats in eight games as the goals dried up, this run included a 5–1 thumping at home to Plymouth Argyle. They responded to this defeat with a 2–0 win over title-favourites Queens Park Rangers as goals from Paynter and McPhee secured the three points despite a red card for Rowland after he put in a two-footed challenge on Marcus Bean. In November, backup keeper Dean Delany joined Macclesfield Town on a two-month loan. On 27 January, Vale were beaten 5–2 at home by Hartlepool United as Sam Collins had a rare off night by giving away a goal and then being sent off.

Horton resigned in February, with the club in the play-offs. His replacement was Vale legend Martin Foyle, whose only previous experience was in the club's youth set-up. As his assistant he appointed former teammate, Dean Glover, another club legend. In March, Foyle made his first signing, bringing defender Craig James on loan from Sunderland, and after a few weeks he signed him permanently. Mark Boyd headed out of the club however, and was allowed to sign with Carlisle United. Vale lost just two of their final twelve games and ran close to a play-off place, only losing out due to their inferior goal difference. They won 2–0 at Rushden & Diamonds on the final day. However, Swindon Town and Hartlepool United played out a 1–1 draw to ensure they both finished in the play-offs instead of Vale.

They finished in seventh place with 73 points. They were level on points with Hartlepool United and Swindon Town but finished outside of the play-off zone due to their inferior goal difference. Stephen McPhee scored 27 goals to become the club's top-scorer, the highest tally since Andy Jones hit 37 in 1986–87. Other major contributions came from Billy Paynter (14), Steve Brooker (8), Marc Bridge-Wilkinson (7) and Adrian Littlejohn (7).

At the end of the season several players left the club: Neil Brisco (Rochdale); Liam Burns (Bristol Rovers); Adrian Littlejohn (Lincoln City); and Dean Delany (Shelbourne). Stephen McPhee also decided to leave the club, and though Chairman Bill Bratt had rejected offers of £100,000 for the player, McPhee exploited a loophole in his contract to join Portuguese side Beira-Mar. Marc Bridge-Wilkinson also turned down a new lower-paying contract, and instead signed with Stockport County. Player-coach Ian Brightwell also left Vale Park, having lost his assistant manager role to Glover, and joined Horton at Macclesfield Town. One boost was that Billy Paynter and George Pilkington put pen to paper on new long-term deals.

=== Finances ===
Peter Walker was appointed as Chief Executive in August 2003, having volunteered to work for free for six months. One feature of the season proved to be the long-running courtroom battle between former chairman Bill Bell and owners Valiant2001 over unpaid rent on the club shop. The club's finances were still worrying for supporters, though the problem appeared to have eased by the end of the season.

In December, a Peter Jackson-led consortium put a £150,000 investment into the club, which Bratt said "...ensures the future of the club is safe". The club also rejected other investment proposals from confidential sources. Vice-chairman Charles Machin recommended the board sell the club to Italian businessman Gianni Paladini for £530,000, but the board disagreed. In March 2004, Machin and director Geoff Wakefield were voted off the board, as the 'Jackson Five' clique elected Peter Jackson and Stan Meigh in their place. Machin said that "I will not go away. I will haunt the corridors of power like Marley's ghost". However, he was never elected back onto the board.

=== Cup competitions ===
In the FA Cup, Vale risked humiliation in a 2–2 draw with non-League Ford United at Vale Park. In the replay, Vale had led 1–0 before a last minute equaliser took the game into extra time. Despite having substitute Ian Armstrong's sent off, the "Valiants" escaped the lottery of the penalty shoot-out when on 114 minutes Ford scored an own goal. However, in the second round they were still eliminated by a non-League club, when Scarborough's Ashley Sestanovich scored an 80th-minute winner at Vale Park. This was the first time a League side had been beaten twice in the same season by the same non-League opponents.

In the League Cup, Vale faced First Division Nottingham Forest. They held Forest to a goalless draw but were eliminated 3–2 in the subsequent penalty shoot-out.

In the Football League Trophy, Vale travelled to the McCain Stadium, where they were defeated 2–1 by Conference club Scarborough.

== Results ==
=== Football League Second Division ===
==== League table ====
Pos	Team	Pld	W	D	L	GF	GA	GD	Pts	Promotion or relegation
5	Swindon Town	46	20	13	13	76	58	+18	73	Qualification for the Second Division play-offs
6	Hartlepool United	46	20	13	13	76	61	+15	73	Qualification for the Second Division play-offs
7	Port Vale	46	21	10	15	73	63	+10	73	
8	Tranmere Rovers	46	17	16	13	59	56	+3	67	
9	Bournemouth	46	17	15	14	56	51	+5	66	

Rules for classification: In the Football League goals scored (GF) takes precedence over goal difference (GD).

==== Results by matchday ====
Round	1	2	3	4	5	6	7	8	9	10	11	12	13	14	15	16	17	18	19	20	21	22	23	24	25	26	27	28	29	30	31	32	33	34	35	36	37	38	39	40	41	42	43	44	45	46
Ground	H	A	H	A	H	A	H	A	A	H	H	A	A	H	H	A	A	H	A	H	A	A	H	A	H	H	H	A	H	H	A	A	A	A	H	H	A	H	H	A	H	A	H	A	H	A
Result	W	W	W	L	W	D	W	L	W	D	W	L	L	L	W	D	L	W	L	D	D	W	D	L	W	W	L	L	W	W	L	W	L	L	D	W	D	W	D	L	W	L	D	W	W	W
Position	8	2	1	4	1	3	1	1	1	1	1	3	3	6	3	4	7	5	7	7	5	7	8	12	6	4	9	9	7	5	7	5	7	9	9	7	9	7	6	7	7	7	7	7	7	7
Points	3	6	9	9	12	13	16	16	19	20	23	23	23	23	26	27	27	30	30	31	32	35	36	36	39	42	42	42	45	48	48	51	51	51	52	55	56	59	60	60	63	63	64	67	70	73

Source: Statto
A = Away; H = Home; W = Win; D = Draw; L = Loss

==== Matches ====
9 August 2003 1	Port Vale	2–1	AFC Bournemouth	Burslem
	McPhee 67'; Littlejohn 87'	Report	Hayter 73'	Stadium: Vale Park; Attendance: 6,465; Referee: Graham Salisbury

16 August 2003 2	Grimsby Town	1–2	Port Vale	Cleethorpes
	Boulding 39'	Report	McPhee 65'; Paynter 68'	Stadium: Blundell Park; Attendance: 4,816; Referee: Phil Prosser

23 August 2003 3	Port Vale	4–3	Colchester United	Burslem
	Collins 34'; Paynter 58'; Armstrong 71'; McPhee 73'	Report	McGleish 26', 38'; Andrews 88'	Stadium: Vale Park; Attendance: 5,133; Referee: Trevor Parkes

25 August 2003 4	Hartlepool United	2–0	Port Vale	Hartlepool
	Robinson 2'; Gabbiadini 88' (pen.)	Report		Stadium: Victoria Park; Attendance: 5,314; Referee: Paul Robinson

30 August 2003 5	Port Vale	1–0	Brentford	Burslem
	Paynter 63'	Report		Stadium: Vale Park; Attendance: 5,257; Referee: Mike Pike

6 September 2003 6	Stockport County	2–2	Port Vale	Stockport
	Beckett 2'; Ellison 40'	Report	Paynter 82'; Collins 90'	Stadium: Edgeley Park; Attendance: 5,316; Referee: Mark Warren

13 September 2003 7	Port Vale	3–1	Barnsley	Burslem
	Lipa 23'; Pilkington 55'; Littlejohn 73'	Report	Fallon 8'	Stadium: Vale Park; Attendance: 7,809; Referee: Mick Fletcher

16 September 2003 8	Luton Town	2–0	Port Vale	Luton
	McSheffrey 31'; Foley 71'	Report		Stadium: Kenilworth Road; Attendance: 5,079; Referee: Joe Ross

20 September 2003 9	Bristol City	0–1	Port Vale	Ashton Gate, Bristol
		Report	Paynter 71'	Stadium: Ashton Gate; Attendance: 11,369; Referee: Brian Curson

27 September 2003 10	Port Vale	1–1	Wycombe Wanderers	Burslem
	McPhee 44'	Report	Mapes 64'	Stadium: Vale Park; Attendance: 6,822; Referee: Roy Pearson

30 September 2003 11	Port Vale	3–0	Peterborough United	Burslem
	McPhee 12', 67'; Collins 86'	Report		Stadium: Vale Park; Attendance: 5,495; Referee: Phil Crossley

4 October 2003 12	Wrexham	2–1	Port Vale	Wrexham
	Jones 33', 78' (pen.)	Report	Paynter 20'	Stadium: Racecourse Ground; Attendance: 5,822; Referee: George Cain / Bob Pollock

11 October 2003 13	Oldham Athletic	2–1	Port Vale	Oldham
12:30 BST	Killen 71'; Eyres 87'	Report	Bridge-Wilkinson 78' (pen.)	Stadium: Boundary Park; Attendance: 6,913; Referee: Mike Jones

18 October 2003 14	Port Vale	1–5	Plymouth Argyle	Burslem
15:15 BST	McPhee 51'	Report	Keith 35'; Friio 38', 72'; Adams 45'; Wotton 46'	Stadium: Vale Park; Attendance: 5,786; Referee: Lee Probert

21 October 2003 15	Port Vale	2–0	Queens Park Rangers	Burslem
	Paynter 5'; McPhee 9'	Report		Stadium: Vale Park; Attendance: 5,243; Referee: Frazer Stretton

25 October 2003 16	Swindon Town	0–0	Port Vale	Swindon
		Report		Stadium: County Ground; Attendance: 5,313; Referee: Trevor Kettle

1 November 2003 17	Chesterfield	1–0	Port Vale	Chesterfield, Derbyshire
	Robinson 60'	Report		Stadium: Saltergate; Attendance: 4,088; Referee: Phil Joslin

15 November 2003 18	Port Vale	1–0	Notts County	Burslem
	McPhee 56'	Report		Stadium: Vale Park; Attendance: 4,900; Referee: Steve Tanner

22 November 2003 19	Tranmere Rovers	1–0	Port Vale	Prenton
	Hume 68'	Report		Stadium: Prenton Park; Attendance: 7,081; Referee: Lee Mason

29 November 2003 20	Port Vale	1–1	Rushden & Diamonds	Burslem
	Littlejohn 10'	Report	Benjamin 31'	Stadium: Vale Park; Attendance: 4,586; Referee: Mark Cowburn

12 December 2003 21	Brighton & Hove Albion	1–1	Port Vale	Brighton
	Knight 16' (pen.)	Report	Littlejohn 50'	Stadium: Withdean Stadium; Attendance: 5,811; Referee: Rob Styles

26 December 2003 22	Sheffield Wednesday	2–3	Port Vale	Owlerton
	Robins 21'; Lee 30'	Report	Littlejohn 25'; Paynter 54'; Brooker 89'	Stadium: Hillsborough Stadium; Attendance: 24,991; Referee: Roy Pearson

28 December 2003 23	Port Vale	2–2	Stockport County	Burslem
	McPhee 4', 28'	Report	Barlow 6'; Lynch 29'	Stadium: Vale Park; Attendance: 6,237; Referee: Kevin Wright

10 January 2004 24	AFC Bournemouth	2–1	Port Vale	Bournemouth
	O'Connor 50' (pen.); Fletcher 55'	Report	McPhee 23'	Stadium: Dean Court; Attendance: 5,926; Referee: Iain Williamson

14 January 2004 25	Port Vale	2–1	Blackpool	Burslem
	Brooker 8'; Bridge-Wilkinson 29'	Report	Sheron 73'	Stadium: Vale Park; Attendance: 4,523; Referee: Andy Penn

17 January 2004 26	Port Vale	5–1	Grimsby Town	Burslem
	Lipa 18'; Collins 20'; Bridge-Wilkinson 33', 74'; Paynter 45'	Report	Jevons 34'	Stadium: Vale Park; Attendance: 5,133; Referee: Alan Kaye

27 January 2004 27	Port Vale	2–5	Hartlepool United	Burslem
	Brooker 8'; Cummins 87'	Report	Shuker 6'; Humphreys 31'; Nelson 69'; Williams 74'; Clarke 83'	Stadium: Vale Park; Attendance: 4,845; Referee: Scott Mathieson

31 January 2004 28	Brentford	3–2	Port Vale	Brentford, West London
	Tabb 2'; Hunt 48'; Rougier 56'	Report	McPhee 30', 90'	Stadium: Griffin Park; Attendance: 4,306; Referee: Mike Thorpe

7 February 2004 29	Port Vale	3–0	Sheffield Wednesday	Burslem
	Littlejohn 42'; McPhee 72'; Brooker 90'	Report		Stadium: Vale Park; Attendance: 7,958; Referee: Mark Cooper

14 February 2004 30	Port Vale	1–0	Oldham Athletic	Burslem
	McPhee 46'	Report		Stadium: Vale Park; Attendance: 6,035; Referee: Steve Tomlin

21 February 2004 31	Plymouth Argyle	2–1	Port Vale	Plymouth
	Phillips 80'; Stonebridge 90'	Report	McPhee 53'	Stadium: Home Park; Attendance: 11,330; Referee: Lee Cable

24 February 2004 32	Colchester United	1–4	Port Vale	Colchester
	McGleish 10' (pen.)	Report	Brooker 13'; Brown 24' (og.); Cummins 27'; Bridge-Wilkinson 73'	Stadium: Layer Road; Attendance: 2,539; Referee: Paul Danson

2 March 2004 33	Queens Park Rangers	3–2	Port Vale	Shepherd's Bush, West London
	Bircham 64'; Cureton 77', 90'	Report	Brooker 2'; Littlejohn 90'	Stadium: Loftus Road; Attendance: 12,593; Referee: Grant Hegley

6 March 2004 34	Blackpool	2–1	Port Vale	Blackpool
	Dinning 54' (pen.); Wellens 60'	Report	Paynter 4'	Stadium: Bloomfield Road; Attendance: 6,878; Referee: Martin Atkinson

13 March 2004 35	Port Vale	1–1	Brighton & Hove Albion	Burslem
	Paynter 26'	Report	Knight 11' (pen.)	Stadium: Vale Park; Attendance: 5,646; Referee: Kevin Friend

16 March 2004 36	Port Vale	1–0	Luton Town	Burslem
	Cummins 84'	Report		Stadium: Vale Park; Attendance: 5,048; Referee: George Cain

20 March 2004 37	Barnsley	0–0	Port Vale	Barnsley
		Report		Stadium: Oakwell; Attendance: 8,267; Referee: Tony Leake

27 March 2004 38	Port Vale	2–1	Bristol City	Burslem
	Brooker 66'; Bridge-Wilkinson 77'	Report	Peacock 90'	Stadium: Vale Park; Attendance: 6,724; Referee: Keith Hill

30 March 2004 39	Port Vale	3–3	Swindon Town	Burslem
	Paynter 14'; McPhee 41', 58'	Report	Parkin 63'; Hewlett 68'; Fallon 83'	Stadium: Vale Park; Attendance: 5,702; Referee: Eddie Ilderton

3 April 2004 40	Wycombe Wanderers	2–1	Port Vale	High Wycombe
	Currie 42' (pen.), 74'	Report	McPhee 7'	Stadium: Adams Park; Attendance: 4,738; Referee: Brian Curson

10 April 2004 41	Port Vale	1–0	Wrexham	Burslem
	Cummins 52'	Report		Stadium: Vale Park; Attendance: 5,892; Referee: Colin Webster

12 April 2004 42	Peterborough United	3–1	Port Vale	Peterborough
	Logan 45'; Williams 55'; Clarke 67'	Report	Bridge-Wilkinson 90'	Stadium: London Road Stadium; Attendance: 4,988; Referee: Phil Joslin

17 April 2004 43	Port Vale	1–1	Chesterfield	Burslem
	Paynter 74'	Report	Evatt 34'	Stadium: Vale Park; Attendance: 5,582; Referee: Lee Mason

24 April 2004 44	Notts County	1–2	Port Vale	Nottingham
	Heffernan 90'	Report	McPhee 4'; Brooker 34'	Stadium: Meadow Lane; Attendance: 5,834; Referee: Phil Prosser

1 May 2004 45	Port Vale	2–1	Tranmere Rovers	Burslem
	McPhee 10', 90'	Report	Hall 24'	Stadium: Vale Park; Attendance: 6,806; Referee: Lee Probert

8 May 2004 46	Rushden & Diamonds	0–2	Port Vale	Irthlingborough
		Report	McPhee 14', 90'	Stadium: Nene Park; Attendance: 5,240; Referee: Paul Armstrong

=== FA Cup ===
8 November 2003 R1	Port Vale	2–2	Ford United	Burslem
	McPhee 60'; Burns 64'	Report	Abraham 20'; Fiddes 74'	Stadium: Vale Park; Attendance: 4,016; Referee: Tony Leake

19 November 2003 Replay	Ford United	1–2 (a.e.t.)	Port Vale	Barkingside, Redbridge
	Poole 90'	Report	Paynter 38'; Chandler 114' (og.)	Stadium: Oakside Stadium; Attendance: 4,016; Referee: Lee Cable

7 December 2003 R2	Port Vale	0–1	Scarborough	Burslem
		Report	Sestanovich 80'	Stadium: Vale Park; Attendance: 4,651; Referee: Frazer Stretton

=== League Cup ===
12 October 2003 R1	Port Vale	0–0 (a.e.t.) (2–3 p)	Nottingham Forest	Burslem
19:45 BST		Report		Stadium: Vale Park; Attendance: 4,950; Referee: Mark Cooper
	Penalties
	McPhee (penalty missed); Bridge-Wilkinson (penalty missed); Paynter (penalty scored); Lipa (penalty scored); Collins (penalty missed)		Harewood (penalty scored); Johnson (penalty missed); Reid (penalty missed); Bopp (penalty scored); Sonner (penalty scored)

=== Football League Trophy ===
14 October 2003 R1	Scarborough	2–1	Port Vale	Scarborough, North Yorkshire
	Senior 77'; Kelly 89'	Report	McPhee 29'	Stadium: Athletic Ground; Attendance: 1,003; Referee: Nigel Miller

== Squad statistics ==
=== Appearances and goals ===
Key to positions: GK – Goalkeeper; DF – Defender; MF – Midfielder; FW – Forward

No.	Pos	Nat	Player	Total		Second Division		FA Cup		League Cup		Football League Trophy	
No.	Pos	Nat	Player	Apps	Goals	Apps	Goals	Apps	Goals	Apps	Goals	Apps	Goals
1	GK	(England) ENG	Mark Goodlad	0	0	0	0	0	0	0	0	0	0
2	DF	(England) ENG	George Pilkington	49	1	44	1	3	0	1	0	1	0
3	DF	(England) ENG	Ian Brightwell	3	0	2	0	0	0	0	0	1	0
4	DF	(Austria) AUT	Andreas Lipa	33	2	30	2	2	0	1	0	0	0
5	DF	(England) ENG	Michael Walsh	14	0	13	0	0	0	1	0	0	0
6	DF	(England) ENG	Sam Collins	47	4	43	4	3	0	1	0	0	0
7	MF	(England) ENG	Neil Brisco	30	0	27	0	2	0	0	0	1	0
8	MF	(Republic of Ireland) IRL	Micky Cummins	46	4	42	4	2	0	1	0	1	0
9	FW	(England) ENG	Steve Brooker	34	8	32	8	1	0	1	0	0	0
10	FW	(Scotland) SCO	Stephen McPhee	51	27	46	25	3	1	1	0	1	1
11	MF	(England) ENG	Marc Bridge-Wilkinson	36	7	32	7	2	0	1	0	1	0
12	GK	(England) ENG	Dean Delany	15	0	14	0	0	0	1	0	0	0
13	MF	(England) ENG	Levi Reid	14	0	11	0	3	0	0	0	0	0
15	MF	(England) ENG	Ian Armstrong	22	1	20	1	1	0	0	0	1	0
16	DF	(Wales) WAL	Steve Rowland	30	0	29	0	0	0	0	0	1	0
17	MF	(Trinidad and Tobago) TTO	Chris Birchall	13	0	10	0	3	0	0	0	0	0
18	FW	(England) ENG	Billy Paynter	48	14	44	13	2	1	1	0	1	0
19	FW	(England) ENG	Simon Eldershaw	0	0	0	0	0	0	0	0	0	0
20	MF	(England) ENG	Adrian Littlejohn	41	7	36	7	3	0	1	0	1	0
21	DF	(Northern Ireland) NIR	Liam Burns	30	1	27	0	3	1	0	0	0	0
22	DF	(England) ENG	Ryan Brown	18	0	17	0	0	0	1	0	0	0
23	GK	(England) ENG	Joe Molloy	0	0	0	0	0	0	0	0	0	0
24	GK	(England) ENG	Jonny Brain	36	0	32	0	3	0	0	0	1	0
25	DF	(England) ENG	Craig James	8	0	8	0	0	0	0	0	0	0
Players who featured but departed the club during the season:
14	MF	(England) ENG	Mark Boyd	26	0	22	0	3	0	0	0	1	0

=== Top scorers ===
Place	Position	Nation	Number	Name	Second Division	FA Cup	League Cup	Football League Trophy	Total
1	FW	Scotland	10	Stephen McPhee	25	1	0	1	27
2	FW	England	18	Billy Paynter	13	1	0	0	14
3	FW	England	9	Steve Brooker	8	0	0	0	8
4	MF	England	11	Marc Bridge-Wilkinson	7	0	0	0	7
–	MF	England	20	Adrian Littlejohn	7	0	0	0	7
6	MF	Ireland	8	Micky Cummins	4	0	0	0	4
–	DF	England	6	Sam Collins	4	0	0	0	4
8	DF	Austria	4	Andreas Lipa	2	0	0	0	2
9	DF	England	2	George Pilkington	1	0	0	0	1
–	MF	England	15	Ian Armstrong	1	0	0	0	1
–	DF	Northern Ireland	21	Liam Burns	0	1	0	0	1
–		–	–	Own goals	1	1	0	0	2
				TOTALS	73	4	0	1	78

== Transfers ==
=== Transfers in ===
Date from	Position	Nationality	Name	From	Fee	Ref.
June 2003	DF	AUT	Andreas Lipa	(Greece) Skoda Xanthi	Free transfer	
June 2003	DF	ENG	George Pilkington	Everton	Free transfer	
August 2003	GK	ENG	Jonny Brain	Carlisle United	Free transfer	
March 2004	DF	ENG	Craig James	Sunderland	Free transfer	

=== Transfers out ===
Date from	Position	Nationality	Name	To	Fee	Ref.
March 2004	MF	ENG	Mark Boyd	Carlisle United	Free transfer	
May 2004	DF	ENG	Ian Brightwell	Macclesfield Town	Free transfer	
May 2004	DF	NIR	Liam Burns	Bristol Rovers	Released	
May 2004	GK	IRL	Dean Delany	(Republic of Ireland) Shelbourne	Free transfer	
June 2004	MF	ENG	Marc Bridge-Wilkinson	Stockport County	Rejected contract	
June 2004	MF	ENG	Neil Brisco	Rochdale	Free transfer	
June 2004	FW	SCO	Stephen McPhee	(Portugal) Beira-Mar	Bosman transfer	
August 2004	MF	ENG	Adrian Littlejohn	Lincoln City	Free transfer	

=== Loans out ===
Date from	Position	Nationality	Name	To	Date to	Ref.
27 November 2003	GK	IRL	Dean Delany	Macclesfield Town	14 January 2004	
