= Paul Byrne (soccer, born 1982) =

South African soccer player

Personal information
- Full name: Paul Byrne
- Date of birth: 26 November 1982 (age 43)
- Place of birth: Newcastle, KwaZulu-Natal, South Africa
- Height: 5 ft 9 in (1.75 m)
- Positions: Left-back; midfielder

Youth career
- Port Vale

Senior career*
| Years | Team | Apps | (Gls) |
| 2000–2003 | Port Vale | 10 | (0) |
| 2003 | Barry Town | 0 | (0) |
| 2003–2004 | Southport | 31 | (0) |
| 2004–2006 | Marine | | |
| 2006–2010 | Kendal Town | | |
| 2010–2012 | Skelmersdale United | | |
| 2012–201? | Bootle | | |
- * Club domestic league appearances and goals

Paul Byrne (born 26 November 1982) is a South African-born former professional footballer.

== Career ==
Byrne began his career as a trainee with Port Vale, where he completed a three-year training scheme and was then rewarded with a professional contract and made ten league appearances. He joined Barry Town in July 2003, but left to join Southport in August 2003 with Barry Town struggling with debts. After an unsuccessful season at Southport he left at the end of the season.

He joined Marine in July 2004, but played just five times the following season, before being ruled out with a leg injury received in the game at home to Prescot Cables on 8 September. After almost a year out of the side, he returned for the start of the 2005–06 season and went on to play 15 times in the Northern Premier League that season.

He joined Kendal Town in 2006, since becoming a crowd favourite, picking up both the Player of the Season and Manager's Player of the Season awards. They finished 19th in the Northern Premier League in 2006–07, 11th in 2007–08, and fifth in 2008–09 and 2009–10. In the summer of 2010, he signed with Skelmersdale United of the Northern Premier League Division One North. United finished as the division's runners-up in 2010–11, finishing behind champions Chester on goal difference. The "Skems" went on to lose to AFC Fylde in the play-offs. He left the club for Bootle in February 2012 as Byrne suffered a serious knee injury and was not expected to return to fitness; United manager Tommy Lawson told him he was unable to guarantee him first-team football as he had signed two replacements. He was appointed club captain at Bootle. The "Bucks" finished third in the North West Counties League in 2011–12 and 2012–13, and then eighth in 2013–14 and seventh in 2014–15. In 2013, he helped Bootle to win the Liverpool Senior Cup by Captaining the side and converting his penalty and in the penalty shoot-out victory over A.F.C. Liverpool. Byrne retired in 2016.

== Career statistics ==
Appearances and goals by club, season and competition
| Club | Season | League | | | FA Cup | | Other | | Total | |
| Club | Season | Division | Apps | Goals | Apps | Goals | Apps | Goals | Apps | Goals |
|---|---|---|---|---|---|---|---|---|---|---|
| Port Vale | 2000–01 | Second Division | 1 | 0 | 0 | 0 | 0 | 0 | 1 | 0 |
| Port Vale | 2001–02 | Second Division | 1 | 0 | 0 | 0 | 1 | 0 | 2 | 0 |
| Port Vale | 2002–03 | Second Division | 8 | 0 | 0 | 0 | 1 | 0 | 9 | 0 |
| Port Vale | Total | | 10 | 0 | 0 | 0 | 2 | 0 | 12 | 0 |
| Southport | 2003–04 | Northern Premier League; Premier Division | 31 | 0 | 1 | 0 | 2 | 0 | 34 | 0 |

== Honours ==
Bootle

- Liverpool Senior Cup: 2013
