= Mark Boyd (footballer) =

English footballer & manager (born 1981)

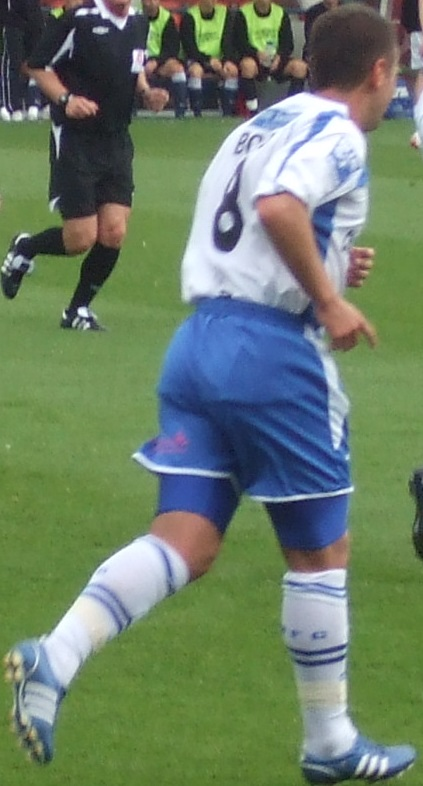
- Boyd playing for Barrow in 2008

Personal information
- Full name: Mark Edward Boyd
- Date of birth: 22 October 1981 (age 45)
- Place of birth: Carlisle, Cumbria, England
- Height: 5 ft 10 in (1.78 m)
- Position: Midfielder

Youth career
- 1989–1998: Carlisle United
- 1998–2002: Newcastle United

Senior career*
| Years | Team | Apps | (Gls) |
| 2002–2004 | Port Vale | 42 | (3) |
| 2004 | Carlisle United | 9 | (1) |
| 2004–2005 | Gretna | 3 | (0) |
| 2005 | → Macclesfield Town (loan) | 5 | (0) |
| 2006 | Accrington Stanley | 6 | (0) |
| 2006–2007 | Southport | 41 | (4) |
| 2007–2008 | Sligo Rovers | | |
| 2008–2011 | Barrow | 80 | (7) |
| 2011 | Droylsden | 22 | (0) |
| 2011–2013 | Workington | 70 | (3) |
| 2013–2015 | Celtic Nation | | |
| 2016 | Penrith | | |
| 2016–2017 | Carlisle City | | |
| 2018–201? | Penrith | | |
| Total | | 278 | (18) |

Managerial career
- 2014–2015: Celtic Nation (player-manager)
- * Club domestic league appearances and goals

Mark Edward Boyd (born 22 October 1981) is an English former football player and manager. He scored 19 goals in 298 league and cup appearances in an 11-year career in the English Football League, Scottish Football League and Conference, and also later spent six years playing non-League football below the Conference level.

Beginning his career as midfielder with Newcastle United, he never made the first team and instead signed with Port Vale in 2002. After two years with the Vale, he moved north to the Scottish side Gretna via Carlisle United. Failing to make an impact, he returned to the Football League with a Macclesfield Town loan in 2005. After a short spell with Accrington Stanley in 2006, he joined non-League side Southport. He joined the Irish club Sligo Rovers in 2007 before turning to the English non-League scene with Barrow the following year. He joined Workington via Droylsden in 2011 before switching to Celtic Nation in June 2013. He helped Celtic Nation to a second-place finish in the Northern League in 2013–14 before taking up the management position for the 2014–15 season, after which the club was folded. He later played for Penrith and Carlisle City.

== Playing career ==
Mark was released from the Carlisle United school of excellence at the age of 14 and joined the Academy at Newcastle United after a successful trial. He left St James' Park in May 2002 on a free transfer to League One side Port Vale after being recommended to the "Valiants" manager Brian Horton by Bobby Robson. However, he suffered a broken ankle with a couple of months of the season remaining. Boyd never really forced his way back into the reckoning the following season as Vale were challenging for the play-offs in League One, and he was released by mutual consent in 2004 to join Carlisle United until the end of the season.

For the next two seasons, Boyd could not forge a longer-term deal with a club and ended up playing bit-part roles for Carlisle United, Gretna, Macclesfield Town, and finally Accrington Stanley, before eventually signing for Conference side Southport before the 2006–07 season. His Southport career began disappointingly with a missed penalty in the team's first game of the season. The next year he transferred to Sligo Rovers in the Republic of Ireland.

In January 2008, he was back in England with Barrow of the Conference North. In May 2008, Barrow beat Staylybridge Celtic 1–0 to gain promotion back into the Conference National via the Conference North play-offs. Boyd remained a key part of the Barrow squad during their first two seasons in the Conference National, culminating in the club's 2–1 victory over Stevenage in the 2009–10 FA Trophy final. In the match itself, Boyd replaced Paul Rutherford with just ten minutes of extra time remaining, Jason Walker having already scored Barrow's winning goal three minutes earlier.

In February 2011, Boyd signed a short contract at Droylsden of the Conference North, following a one-month loan spell. In June of that year, he became Workington's first summer signing, penning a one-year deal. The "Reds" finished 13th and 14th in the Conference North in 2011–12 and 2012–13. He quit Workington in June 2013 to join Northern League side Celtic Nation. He helped Celtic Nation to a second-place finish in the Northern League in 2013–14. After taking a career break, he joined Penrith of the Northern League Division One in March 2016. He moved on to Northern Alliance Premier Division side Carlisle City later in the year.

== Coaching career ==
Boyd was appointed Celtic Nation player-manager in July 2014; at the time of his appointment, the club were undergoing a crisis after a moneyed investor withdrew his support for the club. The club finished second-from-bottom in the 2014–15 campaign, before folding in the summer. He joined Northern League side Shildon as a coach in May 2017, but left after four months. He returned to Penrith as a player-coach in July 2018.

== Later life ==
After retiring as a player, Boyd went on to commentate on Barrow games for BBC Radio Cumbria.

== Career statistics ==
Appearances and goals by club, season and competition
| Club | Season | League | | | FA Cup | | Other | | Total | |
| Club | Season | Division | Apps | Goals | Apps | Goals | Apps | Goals | Apps | Goals |
|---|---|---|---|---|---|---|---|---|---|---|
| Port Vale | 2002–03 | Second Division | 20 | 3 | 1 | 0 | 3 (Note: 1 appearance in the League Cup and 2 appearances in the Football League Trophy.) | 1 | 24 | 4 |
| Port Vale | 2003–04 | Second Division | 22 | 0 | 3 | 0 | 1 (Note: Appearance in the League Cup.) | 0 | 26 | 0 |
| Port Vale | Total | | 42 | 3 | 4 | 0 | 4 | 1 | 50 | 4 |
| Carlisle United | 2003–04 | Third Division | 9 | 1 | 0 | 0 | 0 | 0 | 9 | 1 |
| Gretna | 2004–05 | Scottish Third Division | 2 | 0 | 0 | 0 | 1 (Note: Appearance(s) in the Scottish Challenge Cup.) | 0 | 3 | 0 |
| Gretna | 2005–06 | Scottish Second Division | 1 | 0 | 0 | 0 | 1 | 0 | 2 | 0 |
| Gretna | Total | | 3 | 0 | 0 | 0 | 2 | 0 | 5 | 0 |
| Macclesfield Town (loan) | 2004–05 | League Two | 5 | 0 | 0 | 0 | 0 | 0 | 5 | 0 |
| Accrington Stanley | 2005–06 | Conference National | 6 | 0 | 0 | 0 | 0 | 0 | 6 | 0 |
| Southport | 2006–07 | Conference National | 41 | 4 | 0 | 0 | 0 | 0 | 41 | 4 |
| Barrow | 2008–09 | Conference National | 38 | 5 | 4 | 0 | 0 | 0 | 42 | 5 |
| Barrow | 2009–10 | Conference National | 29 | 1 | 2 | 0 | 0 | 0 | 31 | 1 |
| Barrow | 2010–11 | Conference National | 13 | 1 | 0 | 0 | 0 | 0 | 13 | 1 |
| Barrow | Total | | 80 | 7 | 6 | 0 | 0 | 0 | 86 | 7 |
| Droylsden | 2010–11 | Conference North | 22 | 0 | 0 | 0 | 3 (Note: Appearance(s) in the FA Trophy.) | 1 | 25 | 1 |
| Workington | 2011–12 | Conference North | 39 | 3 | 0 | 0 | 0 | 0 | 39 | 3 |
| Workington | 2012–13 | Conference North | 31 | 0 | 1 | 0 | 0 | 0 | 32 | 0 |
| Workington | Total | | 70 | 3 | 1 | 0 | 0 | 0 | 71 | 3 |
| Career total (Note: Statistics for Sligo Rovers, Celtic Nation, Penrith, and Carlisle City not known.) | | | 278 | 18 | 11 | 0 | 9 | 2 | 298 | 20 |

== Honours ==
Barrow

- Conference North play-offs: 2008
- FA Trophy: 2010

Celtic Nation

- Northern Football League Division One second-place promotion: 2013–14
