= Football League Second Division Player of the Month =

The Football League Second Division Player of the Month award was a monthly prize of recognition given to association football players in the Football League Second Division, the third tier of English football from 1992 to 2004. The award was announced in the first week of the following month. From the 2004–05 season onwards, following a rebranding exercise by The Football League, the third tier was known as Football League One, thus the award became the Football League One Player of the Month award.

== Winners ==
- January 2001 - (England) Jermain Defoe (AFC Bournemouth)
- August 2003 - (England) Tommy Mooney (Swindon Town)
- September 2003 - (England) Sam Collins (Port Vale)
- October 2003 - (France) David Friio (Plymouth Argyle)
- November 2003 - (England) Clarke Carlisle (Queens Park Rangers)
- December 2003 - (England) Marlon Beresford (Luton Town)
- April 2004 - (England) Adam Boyd (Hartlepool United)
- For results from 2004–05 onwards, see EFL League One Player of the Month.
