= Mark Goodlad =

English footballer

Personal information
- Full name: Mark Goodlad
- Date of birth: 9 September 1979 (age 47)
- Place of birth: Barnsley, England
- Height: 6 ft 1 in (1.85 m)
- Position: Goalkeeper

Youth career
- 199?–199?: Rotherham United

Senior career*
Years	Team	Apps	(Gls)
1998–2000	Nottingham Forest	0	(0)
1999	→ Scarborough (loan)	3	(0)
2000–2008	Port Vale	212	(0)
Total		215	(0)

International career
199?–199?	England U15		
- * Club domestic league appearances and goals

Mark Goodlad (born 9 September 1979) is an English former professional football player and coach.

Goodlad was a goalkeeper and began his career at Nottingham Forest, playing on loan at Scarborough, before joining Port Vale in 2000. He became the Vale's first-choice keeper for several seasons until he was forced to retire due to injury in 2008. During his time at Vale Park, he was made Player of the Year in 2001–02 and also picked up a Football League Trophy winner's medal in 2001. He made 250 competitive appearances in a ten-year professional career, primarily in the third tier of the English Football League.

He turned to coaching after retiring as a player, working as a goalkeeping coach at Nottingham Forest, the JCB Academy, the Nike Academy, Barnsley and York City. He became an assistant manager at Hartlepool United in February 2023 before leaving in December 2023.

== Playing career ==
=== Nottingham Forest ===
Goodlad kept goal for Barnsley schoolboys from the age of eleven to 16, spent time at the Rotherham United centre of excellence, and also represented England at under-15 level. He turned professional at Nottingham Forest, though did not make a first-team appearance during the club's relegation from the Premier League in 1998–99. He was though loaned out to Third Division Scarborough in February. He played three games in the club's final season of league football.

=== Port Vale ===
Back with Forest, who were now in the First Division, he still failed to make it onto the pitch and so, in March 2000, he switched to league rivals Port Vale. Though he played only one game for the "Valiants" in 1999–2000, he was behind the more experienced Paul Musselwhite and his deputy Kevin Pilkington in the pecking order. After Musselwhite and Pilkington moved on in the summer, Goodlad's only competition for the number one jersey came from Irishman Dean Delany, also aged 20. A consistent Goodlad proved himself to be the superior talent, and went to make fifty appearances in 2000–01, also keeping goal in the club's 2001 Football League Trophy success at the Millennium Stadium. The young keeper also posted fifty appearances in the 2001–02 campaign and was handed the club's Player of the Year award for his strong performances.

Recovering from a dislocated finger to make the start of the 2002–03 season, he went on to maintain his consistency over his 42 games despite the turmoil of the club entering administration. At the end of the season, he was forced to undergo an operation on a finger injury and thereby spend a lengthy time on the sidelines. He missed the entirety of the 2003–04 season due to his finger injury, and was forced to make his recovery in games held behind closed doors. A young Jonny Brain was signed to provide cover for Delany, but instead took his place as Vale's regular stopper during Goodlad's absence. He missed the start of 2004–05 with a thigh muscle injury, and only played twenty games all season.

Goodlad was back to his quiet and consistent best in 2005–06, posting 52 appearances in both league and cup, fending off competition from a teenage Joe Anyon. Throughout the season he faced four penalties, three of which he saved and one was of which hit the post. At the end of the campaign he put pen to paper on a new two-year deal, despite rumours that circulated on a fan site of a falling out with manager Martin Foyle – one of many rumours that "quite annoyed" many of the players.

The club's number one for the start of the 2006–07 campaign, injury struck him again, ending his career. Before this though, he had one of the finest games of his career, picking up the man of the match award in a League Cup clash with top-flight Tottenham Hotspur. He picked up his final injury on 30 December, in a game against Bristol City at Ashton Gate, after he got his ankle caught in mud and had to be stretchered off the field within the opening minutes. He ruptured his right Achilles tendon and had to have reconstructive surgery. Following the incident Musselwhite was re-signed by the club on an emergency basis, now aged 38.

Goodlad played no part in the 2007–08 season and announced his retirement on 2 January 2008 after it emerged that his Achilles tendon injury would need further surgery – surgery which carried the risk that he would have to use a wheelchair for the rest of his life. Goodlad opted to retire rather than risk handicapping himself. A benefit match was arranged for Goodlad – Port Vale Legends against Wolves legends at Vale Park on 6 August 2008. In May 2019, he was voted into the "Ultimate Port Vale XI" by members of the OneValeFan supporter website.

== Coaching career ==
In September 2010, he was working as both a goalkeeping coach at Nottingham Forest and a sports teacher at the JCB Academy. He went on to work at the Nike Academy. He later worked as head goalkeeper coach at Barnsley. In April 2022, he joined York City as goalkeeping coach. He left the role on the appointment of Joe Stead in January 2023. On 23 February 2023, he was appointed assistant manager to John Askey at League Two club Hartlepool United, the manager who had brought him to York City. However, on 30 December 2023, Askey and Goodlad were dismissed.

== Career statistics ==
Appearances and goals by club, season and competition
Club	Season	League			FA Cup		League Cup		Other		Total	
Club	Season	Division	Apps	Goals	Apps	Goals	Apps	Goals	Apps	Goals	Apps	Goals
Scarborough (loan)	1998–99	Third Division	3	0	—		—		—		3	0
Port Vale	1999–2000	First Division	1	0	—		—		—		1	0
Port Vale	2000–01	Second Division	40	0	2	0	2	0	6 (Note: Appearance(s) in the EFL Trophy.)	0	50	0
Port Vale	2001–02	Second Division	43	0	2	0	2	0	3	0	50	0
Port Vale	2002–03	Second Division	37	0	1	0	1	0	3	0	42	0
Port Vale	2003–04	Second Division	0	0	0	0	0	0	0	0	0	0
Port Vale	2004–05	League One	20	0	0	0	0	0	0	0	20	0
Port Vale	2005–06	League One	46	0	5	0	1	0	0	0	52	0
Port Vale	2006–07	League One	25	0	2	0	4	0	1	0	32	0
Port Vale	2007–08	League One	0	0	0	0	0	0	0	0	0	0
Port Vale	Total		212	0	12	0	10	0	13	0	247	0
Career total			215	0	12	0	10	0	13	0	250	0

== Honours ==
Port Vale

- Football League Trophy: 2000–01

Individual

- Port Vale Player of the Year: 2002
