= Gareth Davies (footballer, born 1983) =

English footballer (born 1983)

Personal information
- Full name: Gareth Michael John Davies
- Date of birth: 4 February 1983 (age 43)
- Place of birth: Chesterfield, England
- Height: 6 ft 1 in (1.85 m)
- Positions: Full back; midfielder

Senior career*
Years	Team	Apps	(Gls)
2002–2008	Chesterfield	116	(2)
2007	→ Stalybridge Celtic (loan)	5	(0)
2008	Halifax Town	11	(1)
2008–2009	Gainsborough Trinity	0	(0)
2009–2010	Matlock Town	16	(1)
2010–?	Boston United	10	(0)
- Buxton
?–2013	Matlock Town		
2013–2014	Belper Town		
2014–201?	Handsworth Parramore		
- * Club domestic league appearances and goals

Gareth Michael John Davies (born 4 February 1983) is an English former footballer who played as a midfielder or full back.

== Career ==
Davies was born in Chesterfield, England.

Davies transferred to Chesterfield from Buxton in 2001. Whilst playing for Chesterfield F.C. he broke his foot in three places in a pre-season friendly in August 2007, which ruled him out for at least six weeks. He joined Stalybridge Celtic on a month's loan in September 2007 to help his return to first-team football. He made five appearances during his spell with the club. He left Chesterfield by mutual consent in January 2008. He joined York City on trial in February, but joined Halifax Town later that month on a deal until the end of the season. He signed for Gainsborough Trinity in the Conference North in July 2008. He moved to Matlock Town for the 2009/10 season but subsequently joined Boston United in January 2010.

He later had spells with Buxton and Matlock Town.

In October 2013 he joined Belper Town from Matlock Town.

In November 2014, Davies moved to Handsworth Parramore.

As of 2016, Davies was playing in the Chesterfield Sunday League.

== After football ==
He formed a health and safety training firm for the construction industry, Essential Site Skills, in 2013 alongside two others, and this company won the Best Advertising Campaign Award at the UK Asbestos Training Association (UKATA) Excellence Awards in 2018.
