= Neil Brisco =

English footballer

Personal information
- Full name: Neil Anthony Brisco
- Date of birth: 26 January 1978 (age 48)
- Place of birth: Wigan, England
- Height: 6 ft 0 in (1.83 m)
- Position: Midfielder

Youth career
- ?–1997: Manchester City

Senior career*
Years	Team	Apps	(Gls)
1997–1998	Manchester City	0	(0)
1998–2004	Port Vale	119	(2)
2004–2006	Rochdale	27	(0)
2004	→ Northwich Victoria (loan)	5	(1)
2005	→ Northwich Victoria (loan)	5	(0)
2006	Scarborough	0	(0)
2006	Barrow	?	(?)
2006	Mossley	2	(0)
2007–2009	Leigh RMI	?	(?)
2009	Chorley	1	(0)
Total		159+	(3+)
- * Club domestic league appearances and goals

Neil Anthony Brisco (born 26 January 1978) is an English former footballer. A versatile player, he was comfortable both in defence and in midfield.

A former Manchester City trainee, he made his name in six years with Port Vale between 1998 and 2004, lifting the Football League Trophy in 2001. Following this, he spent two years at Rochdale, also playing on loan at Northwich Victoria, before entering Non-League football permanently in 2006. He then spent brief periods with Scarborough, Barrow, and Mossley. Following a couple of years with Leigh RMI, he retired from the game at Chorley in 2009 to concentrate on his work with the prison service.

== Career ==
=== Manchester City ===
Brisco started his career as a trainee with Manchester City, though he never made it onto the field for the Maine Road club. At the end of the 1997–98 season, City lost their First Division status, though Brisco maintained his by signing with Port Vale.

=== Port Vale ===
He made his Port Vale debut in the 1998–99 season, playing 87 minutes of the club's 3–0 defeat to Liverpool in the FA Cup. In 1999–2000, he played 14 games, though Vale were relegated into the Second Division. He scored his first competitive goal on 10 February 2001, in a 2–1 victory over Bournemouth at Vale Park. He played as the midfield anchor to the highly skilled duo of Marc Bridge-Wilkinson and Dave Brammer. However, he was restricted to 21 appearances in 2000–01, and so underwent surgery on an ankle injury to try to regain match fitness. Despite this he was still a part of Brian Horton's 2001 Football League Trophy winning first XI.

He was a key first player in the 2001–02 campaign, making 43 appearances in league and cup. He found his first-team chances more limited during the 2002–03 season and played just 24 games as the "Valiants" endured administration. He did, though, manage to find the net on 15 March in a 1–1 draw with local rivals Crewe Alexandra at the Alexandra Stadium. He was allowed a move to Stockport County in August 2003, with manager Carlton Palmer wanting a dominant midfielder; however, Brisco failed a medical because of a knee injury and the move did not go through. He made thirty appearances in 2003–04. Though manager Martin Foyle was disappointed with his side for failing to reach the play-offs, he still offered Brisco a one-month period in which to mull over a new contract offer. He chose to reject the deal, and so left to join League Two Rochdale.

=== Rochdale ===
However, he proved to be unhappy at Spotland, and requested a loan move after a few months. He got his wish in November, as he joined Northwich Victoria of the Conference National. After five games, Rochdale manager Steve Parkin denied "Vics" manager Steve Burr's request to extend the loan into a second month. Brisco quickly returned to the Victoria Stadium though, joining the club on loan in January 2005. The loan ran into February, as Brisco helped the club to climb out of the relegation zone. Regardless of this, following his return to his parent club Northwich were demoted to the Conference North for the 2005–06 season due to ground concerns. Brisco played 17 games for Rochdale in 2005–06 despite struggling with a knee injury. He was not offered a new contract at the end of the campaign.

=== Later career ===
He spent brief periods with Conference North sides Scarborough and Barrow before heading into Northern Premier League Premier Division with Mossley in November 2006. He spell with Mossley lasted a matter of weeks, and he left after playing just two games. Following a couple of years with Leigh RMI, he joined Chorley in November 2009. After only one Northern Premier League Division One North game for the club, he retired from football through injury so as to concentrate on his work in the prison service.

== Style of play ==
Brisco was a tough-tackling and hard-working midfielder.

== Career statistics ==
Appearances and goals by club, season and competition
Club	Season	League			FA Cup		League Cup		Other		Total	
Club	Season	Division	Apps	Goals	Apps	Goals	Apps	Goals	Apps	Goals	Apps	Goals
Port Vale	1998–99	First Division	1	0	1	0	0	0	—		2	0
Port Vale	1999–2000	First Division	13	0	1	0	0	0	—		14	0
Port Vale	2000–01	Second Division	17	1	0	0	0	0	5 (Note: Appearance(s) in the EFL Trophy.)	0	22	1
Port Vale	2001–02	Second Division	37	0	1	0	2	0	3	0	43	0
Port Vale	2002–03	Second Division	24	1	0	0	0	0	0	0	24	1
Port Vale	2003–04	Second Division	27	0	2	0	0	0	1	0	30	0
Port Vale	Total		119	2	5	0	2	0	9	0	135	2
Rochdale	2004–05	League Two	11	0	0	0	0	0	1	0	12	0
Rochdale	2005–06	League Two	16	0	0	0	0	0	1	0	17	0
Rochdale	Total		27	0	0	0	0	0	2	0	29	0
Northwich Victoria (loan)	2004–05	Conference National	10	1	0	0	—		1 (Note: Appearance(s) in the FA Trophy.)	0	11	1
Scarborough	2006–07	Conference North	0	0	0	0	—		0	0	0	0
Mossley	2006–07	Northern Premier League; Premier Division	2	0	0	0	—		0	0	2	0
Chorley	2009–10	Northern Premier League; Division One	1	0	0	0	—		0	0	1	0
Career total (Note: Statistics for Barrow and Leigh RMI not recorded.)			159	3	5	0	2	0	12	0	178	3

== Honours ==
Port Vale

- Football League Trophy: 2000–01
