= Ian Armstrong (footballer) =

English footballer (born 1981)

Personal information
- Full name: Ian Armstrong
- Date of birth: 16 November 1981 (age 44)
- Place of birth: Kirkby, England
- Height: 5 ft 8 in (1.73 m)
- Position: Midfielder

Youth career
- 2000–2001: Liverpool

Senior career*
Years	Team	Apps	(Gls)
2001–2005	Port Vale	88	(14)

International career
1997–1998	England U16	4	(0)
1999	England U18	2	(0)
- * Club domestic league appearances and goals

Ian Armstrong (born 16 November 1981) is an English former footballer who played mainly as a winger or an attacking midfielder. He played 101 league and cup games for Port Vale between 2002 and 2005 before injury forced his early retirement at 23. He also represented England at under-16 and under-18 levels.

== Career ==
After coming through the ranks of the Liverpool academy, he signed for Port Vale in the summer of 2001. He made his Second Division debut at Vale Park under Brian Horton, in a 4–2 win over Notts County on 11 August 2001. He scored his first goal on 5 October in a 5–0 win over Cambridge United. He made a total of 34 appearances in his maiden season with the "Valiants", scoring five goals.

He scored eight goals in 34 games in the 2002–03 campaign, including a brace in a 5–1 over Huddersfield Town on 26 April. However, a series of injuries dogged his career from the very start, severely reduced his impact in 2003–04, and he was limited to 22 appearances. Injuries continued in the 2004–05 season, though he did find the net three times in his eight League One appearances. His injuries ultimately led to his retirement in 2005, at the age of 23, following an unsuccessful trial with Brian Horton at Macclesfield Town.

== Personal life ==
He attended Lathom High School in Lancashire and is a half-brother to media personality Kerry Katona.

== Career statistics ==
Appearances and goals by club, season and competition
Club	Season	League			FA Cup		League Cup		Other		Total	
Club	Season	Division	Apps	Goals	Apps	Goals	Apps	Goals	Apps	Goals	Apps	Goals
Port Vale	2001–02	Second Division	31	3	1	0	0	0	2 (Note: Appearance(s) in the EFL Trophy.)	2	34	5
Port Vale	2002–03	Second Division	29	7	1	0	1	0	3	1	34	8
Port Vale	2003–04	Second Division	20	1	1	0	0	0	1	0	22	1
Port Vale	2004–05	League One	8	3	1	0	1	0	1	0	11	3
Port Vale	Total		88	14	4	0	2	0	7	3	101	17
Career total			88	14	4	0	2	0	7	3	101	17
