= Sam Collins (footballer, born 1977) =

English football manager (born 1977)

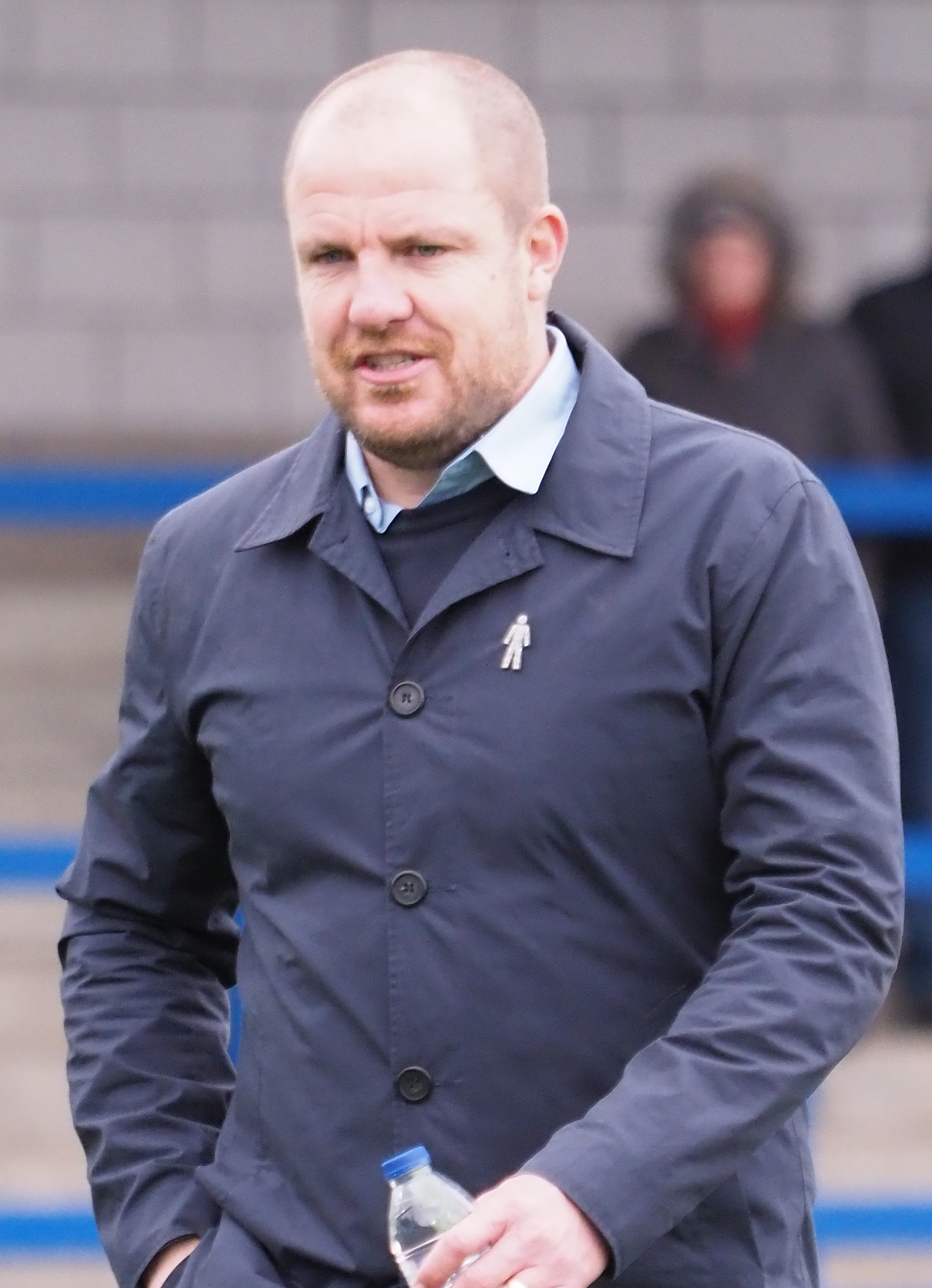
- Collins as manager of York City in 2018

Personal information
- Full name: Sam Jason Collins
- Date of birth: 5 June 1977 (age 49)
- Place of birth: Pontefract, England
- Height: 6 ft 3 in (1.91 m)
- Position: Centre back

Youth career
- –1994: Huddersfield Town

Senior career*
Years	Team	Apps	(Gls)
1994–1999	Huddersfield Town	37	(0)
1999–2002	Bury	82	(2)
2002–2006	Port Vale	135	(11)
2005–2006	→ Hull City (loan)	10	(0)
2006–2008	Hull City	13	(0)
2007	→ Swindon Town (loan)	4	(0)
2008–2015	Hartlepool United	244	(6)
Total		525	(19)

Managerial career
- 2014: Hartlepool United (caretaker)
- 2014: Hartlepool United (caretaker)
- 2017: Hartlepool United (caretaker)
- 2018–2019: York City
- * Club domestic league appearances and goals

Sam Jason Collins (born 5 June 1977) is an English professional football manager and former footballer who is a youth coach at EFL League One club Barnsley. He played as a centre back in the Football League for Huddersfield Town, Bury, Port Vale, Hull City, Swindon Town and Hartlepool United. He managed in the Football League with Hartlepool United.

Collins started his career with Huddersfield Town in 1994 before he signed for Bury in 1999. After three years, he moved on to Port Vale, where he established himself as captain. He was named the club's Player of the Year at the end of the 2002–03 season. Collins' performances earned him a move to Hull City in 2006, though knee injuries blighted his time at the club. Loaned to Swindon Town for a brief spell in 2007; the following year, he signed permanently with Hartlepool United.

Collins took on a coaching role with Hartlepool in 2014 and had three spells as caretaker manager before leaving the club in 2017. He spent a year as a coach at Bradford City before becoming youth-team manager at York City. He took over as manager in August 2018, initially as caretaker manager, before leaving in January 2019. He has since coached at Barnsley and Mansfield Town.

== Playing career ==
=== Huddersfield Town ===
Collins was born in Pontefract, West Yorkshire. He started his career at First Division club Huddersfield Town as a trainee, signing a professional contract on 6 July 1994.

=== Bury ===
Collins signed for Second Division club Bury on 2 July 1999 for a £75,000 fee. He was released at the end of the 2001–02 season, following the club's relegation to the Third Division.

=== Port Vale ===
He signed for Second Division club Port Vale on 26 June 2002, in a move that reunited him with Brian Horton, his manager at Huddersfield. He was signed as a replacement for Sagi Burton. After an initial shaky start, Collins played 49 matches for Port Vale and was named their Player of the Year in the 2002–03 season, later becoming captain. In September 2003, he was given the Second Division Player of the Month award, as he settled into a highly successful centre-back partnership with new signing George Pilkington. At the end of the 2003–04 season he signed a new two-year contract, having put in a 47-match haul.

Collins made 37 appearances in 2004–05, helping the club to avoid relegation with an 18th-place finish in League One. His continuing strong performances in 2005–06 led to Championship club Plymouth Argyle inquiring about signing him. He rejected the approach, and instead joined another Championship club, Hull City, on 2 November on loan from Vale, prior to a permanent transfer for a £65,000 fee in January 2006. Michael Talbot later studied him heading the ball as a model for the sculpture of Roy Sproson that was installed at Vale Park.

=== Hull City ===
Collins signed a two-year deal with Hull. He suffered a knee ligament injury in February 2006, which ruled him out for a month. He did not play again in the 2005–06 season, which he finished with 18 appearances for Hull. In November 2006, he was ruled out for the rest of the 2006–07 season through another knee injury, making only eight appearances. He joined Swindon Town on 28 September 2007 on a one-month loan, after the club lost captain Hasney Aljofree to injury. He looked for a permanent deal at Swindon but made just four appearances as an abductor injury saw him sidelined. Swindon's financial problems ended any hopes of a permanent transfer.

=== Hartlepool United ===
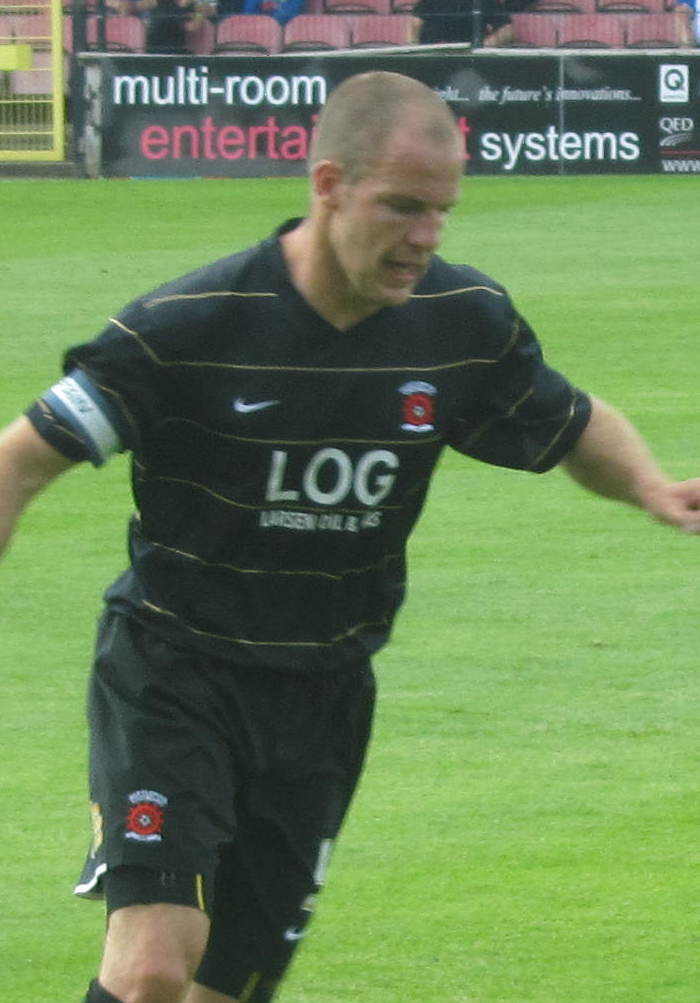
Collins playing for Hartlepool United in 2011

He signed for a nominal fee for League One club Hartlepool United on 31 January 2008. After only several weeks with the club he was sidelined by an injury sustained from an awkward fall. This came just days after assistant manager Ian Butterworth praised Collins for "[adding] steel to the back four".

He was appointed team captain at the start of his first full season with the club, and made 48 appearances by the end of the campaign. His consistency continued in 2009–10, as he made 48 appearances. He signed a new contract with the club in May 2010. He was named as the League One Player of the Month for December 2010. After making 49 appearances in the 2010–11 season, he signed a new contract with the club in May 2011. Collins was hopeful that manager Mick Wadsworth could lead the club to the play-offs in 2011–12, although they could only manage a 13th-place finish. He made 43 appearances in the 2012–13 season, as Hartlepool suffered relegation to League Two with a 23rd-place finish, and was retained for a further season. Collins made 43 appearances during the 2013–14 season, and was praised by manager Colin Cooper for the positive influence he had on the rest of the team. He was named in the Football League Team of the Week for his performance in a 2–0 win away to Dagenham & Redbridge on 8 February, which was the team's third clean sheet in four matches.

Collins played his final game in football on 22 November 2014 in a 3–1 home defeat against York City.

== Style of play ==
Collins played as a centre back and was described in March 2011 by his Hartlepool United manager Mick Wadsworth as a "warrior" who "leads by example" and as a "fearless header of the ball. Soon after signing for Hartlepool, manager Danny Wilson stated in February 2008 that: "He's a calming influence, he's a leader and that's what we needed in that backline. You'll get that consistency from him, he doesn't complicate his game." He also had an excellent range to his throw-ins.

== Coaching and managerial career ==
Collins took on the role of assistant first and reserve-team coach at Hartlepool United in May 2014 when signing a new contract with the club, while remaining part of the playing squad. After Colin Cooper resigned as manager of Hartlepool, Collins was appointed caretaker manager alongside Stephen Pears on 5 October 2014. He took charge of four matches, overseeing one win and three losses, before Paul Murray was appointed as manager. Murray was dismissed on 6 December after only 45 days in charge, and Collins was again appointed caretaker manager. He took charge of one match, a 4–0 defeat away to Burton Albion on 13 December, before Ronnie Moore was appointed as manager on 16 December, who then appointed Collins as his assistant. Collins took over as caretaker manager on 15 January 2017 after Craig Hignett left the club by mutual consent. He was in charge for Hartlepool's 2–0 home win over Stevenage on 21 January before Dave Jones took over as manager on 23 January. Collins was dismissed by Hartlepool on 10 March, with Jones explaining the decision by saying: "We're changing the culture and the ethos here and when that happens sometimes there are casualties".

Collins joined League One club Bradford City on 3 July 2017 as their Professional Development Coach, a role in which he "[worked] closely with Stuart McCall and Kenny Black in helping to bring forward the younger professionals within the first team squad". He left his role with Bradford on 28 June 2018.

Collins was appointed youth-team manager at National League North club York City on 3 July 2018. He took over as caretaker manager on 20 August after the departure of manager Martin Gray. His first match in charge came on 25 August, when York drew 0–0 away to Brackley Town. Collins recorded his first win two days later in the following match, with York beating Blyth Spartans 2–0 at home. He was appointed permanently on 10 October after the team won four of his eight matches as caretaker manager. He was dismissed on 5 January 2019 with the team 15th in the table.

Collins coached at Barnsley as their lead youth development phase coach before being appointed as Mansfield Town's lead youth development youth coach in August 2020. On 28 October, he was announced to be part of Richard Cooper's caretaker management team, before Nigel Clough was appointed as the club's new permanent manager on 6 November. Collins returned to Barnsley as Senior Professional Development Phase Transitional Coach in October 2023, four months after departing Mansfield.

== Personal life ==
Collins married Claire in 1999, and the couple have four children. After finding that Collins had been having an affair, Claire posted derogatory messages on Collins' Twitter account, which were widely reported in the tabloids. She wrote in a separate message, "I hope he feels as meaningless as I do!" In June 2022, Collins' son Cody signed his first professional contract with Mansfield Town.

== Career statistics ==
=== Playing statistics ===
Appearances and goals by club, season and competition
Season	Club	League			FA Cup		League Cup		Other		Total	
Season	Club	Division	Apps	Goals	Apps	Goals	Apps	Goals	Apps	Goals	Apps	Goals
Huddersfield Town	1996–97	First Division	4	0	0	0	2	0	—		6	0
Huddersfield Town	1997–98	First Division	10	0	0	0	1	0	—		11	0
Huddersfield Town	1998–99	First Division	23	0	3	0	4	0	—		30	0
Huddersfield Town	Total		37	0	3	0	7	0	—		47	0
Bury	1999–2000	Second Division	19	0	1	0	2	0	0	0	22	0
Bury	2000–01	Second Division	34	2	1	0	2	0	0	0	37	2
Bury	2001–02	Second Division	29	0	0	0	1	0	1 (Note: Appearance(s) in Football League Trophy)	0	31	0
Bury	Total		82	2	2	0	5	0	1	0	90	2
Port Vale	2002–03	Second Division	44	5	1	0	1	0	3	0	49	5
Port Vale	2003–04	Second Division	43	4	3	0	1	0	0	0	47	4
Port Vale	2004–05	League One	33	2	1	0	1	0	2	0	37	2
Port Vale	2005–06	League One	15	0	—		1	0	—		16	0
Port Vale	Total		135	11	5	0	4	0	5	0	149	11
Hull City	2005–06	Championship	17	0	1	0	—		—		18	0
Hull City	2006–07	Championship	6	0	0	0	2	0	—		8	0
Hull City	2007–08	Championship	0	0	1	0	0	0	—		1	0
Hull City	Total		23	0	2	0	2	0	—		27	0
Swindon Town (loan)	2007–08	League One	4	0	—		—		0	0	4	0
Hartlepool United	2007–08	League One	10	2	—		—		—		10	2
Hartlepool United	2008–09	League One	40	1	2	0	3	0	1	0	46	1
Hartlepool United	2009–10	League One	44	0	1	0	2	0	1	0	48	0
Hartlepool United	2010–11	League One	42	2	3	0	2	0	2	0	49	2
Hartlepool United	2011–12	League One	36	1	0	0	1	0	0	0	37	1
Hartlepool United	2012–13	League One	41	0	1	0	1	0	0	0	43	0
Hartlepool United	2013–14	League Two	24	0	2	0	0	0	1	0	27	0
Hartlepool United	2014–15	League Two	7	0	1	0	1	0	0	0	9	0
Hartlepool United	Total		244	6	10	0	10	0	5	0	269	6
Career total			525	19	22	0	28	0	11	0	586	19

=== Managerial statistics ===
As of 5 January 2019

Managerial record by team and tenure
Team	From	To	Record					Ref.
Team	From	To	P	W	D	L	Win %	Ref.
Hartlepool United (caretaker)	5 October 2014	23 October 2014	4	1	0	3	25.0	
Hartlepool United (caretaker)	6 December 2014	16 December 2014	1	0	0	1	0.0	
Hartlepool United (caretaker)	15 January 2017	23 January 2017	1	1	0	0	100.0	
York City	20 August 2018	5 January 2019	26	10	5	11	38.5	
Total			32	12	5	15	37.5	

== Honours ==
Individual

- Port Vale Player of the Year: 2002–03
- Football League Second Division Player of the Month: September 2003
- Football League One Player of the Month: December 2010
