= Phil Joslin (referee) =

English football referee

- Full name: Philip J Joslin
- Born: 23 March 1959 (age 67); Newark-on-Trent, Nottinghamshire, England

Domestic
Years	League	Role
1992-1995	Football League	Asst. referee
1995-1999	Premier League	Asst. referee
1999-	Football League	Referee

International
Years	League	Role
1995-1999	FIFA listed	Asst. referee

Philip J. Joslin (born 23 March 1959, Newark-on-Trent, Nottinghamshire) is an English association football referee who operates in the Football League. In addition, he has previously held the position of assistant referee for both the Premier League and FIFA, and also fulfilled that role in the 1998 FA Cup Final at Wembley.

== Career ==
Joslin first took up the whistle in 1979, officiating in leagues local to his home town, eventually being made an assistant referee in the Football League in 1992. His promotion to the Premier League assistant referees' list came in 1995, perhaps unusually, as this happened before he had been appointed to referee in the Football League. In 1998, he was an assistant referee for Paul Durkin in the FA Cup Final at Wembley on 16 May 1998, when Arsenal defeated Newcastle 2–0.

His promotion to the FIFA list of assistant referees also came in 1995, and he was included as one of the English team of officials at Euro 96.

The step up to Football League referee came in 1999, with his first game being the Third Division tie on 7 August 1999 between Halifax Town and Darlington at The Shay, when the home side lost 1–0 to a Marco Gabbiadini goal. On 18 March 2000, he took charge of a semi-final, first leg, in the FA Vase between Vauxhall Motors and Chippenham, which finished 0–0.

He was congratulated on his performance during a First Division match, between Ipswich Town and Burnley on 22 October 2002, which ended as a 2–2 draw. Burnley's assistant manager Sam Ellis said: "We had a word with him after the game and praised him for his part in a match of such quality. The ref let the game flow, decided against using yellow cards and he certainly helped it as a spectacle".

In 2004, he received praise from Darlington's manager, David Hodgson, after reviewing a decision made during their FA Cup first round tie at home to Yeovil Town on 13 November 2004. "Joslin ... admitted he was wrong to send [Brian] Close off in the closing stages", and rescinded the red card. Hodgson said: "It's not often that a referee will admit he is in the wrong but he has and I think he deserves a lot of credit for that. He has taken it upon himself to ring me and ask me what I saw. I told him and he agreed that he'd made a mistake."

He was an assistant referee for only the second match to be played at the "new" Wembley Stadium, as England under-16s played Spain under-16s on 28 April 2007 in front of 28,210 people, England winning 1–0.

On 13 March 2008, it was announced that Phil Joslin would be taking charge of the Football League Trophy Final at Wembley on 30 March 2008. The participating teams are Grimsby Town and MK Dons.

Joslin has never refereed a Premier League match, despite the number of years he has been at the higher levels of refereeing. He has, however, operated as fourth official in the Premiership, such as during the Birmingham versus Liverpool match at St. Andrew's on 12 February 2005, for Howard Webb, and the Liverpool versus Middlesbrough encounter at Anfield on 18 April 2007, for Graham Poll.

Through affiliation, he was the County Referees Officer for the Derbyshire County Football Association (rather than Nottinghamshire) until 2008, when he became Referee Development Officer for the Lincolnshire Football Association. He holds a Level 3 FA Referees Coaching qualification, and was a tutorial participant in the FA Young Referees' Conference at Staverton Park, Daventry, Northants, on 31 May 2007.

Phil has now taken up position as one of the new Referee Development Officers at Lincolnshire FA.
