= Leo Gershoy Award =

- Leo Gershoy Award in Western European History
- Awarded for: "...the most outstanding work published in English on any aspect of 17th- and 18th-century western European history...."
- Sponsored by: American Historical Association
- Date: 1977; 49 years ago
- Location: AHA annual meeting
- Country: United States
- Presented by: AHA
- Website: www.historians.org/award-grant/leo-gershoy-award/

The Leo Gershoy Award is a book prize awarded by the American Historical Association for the best publication in English dealing with the history of Europe in the seventeenth and eighteenth centuries. Endowed in 1975 by the Gershoy family and first awarded two years later, the prize commemorates Leo Gershoy, professor of French history at New York University. It was awarded biennially until 1985, and annually thereafter.

The first recipient of the award was Simon Schama; other distinguished honorees include Robert Darnton, John H. Elliott and Roy Porter. Carla Rahn Phillips of the University of Minnesota has uniquely won the prize on two occasions.

== List of prizewinners ==
Sourced from AHA

- 2026 — Jennifer Ngaire Heuer, The Soldier’s Reward: Love and War in the Age of the French Revolution and Napoleon (Princeton University Press)
- 2025 — Amanda Wunder, Spanish Fashion in the Age of Velázquez: A Tailor at the Court of Philip IV (Yale University Press)
- 2024 — Vera Keller, The Interlopers: Early Stuart Projects and the Undisciplining of Knowledge (Johns Hopkins University Press)
- 2023 — Meredith Martin and Gillian Weiss, The Sun King at Sea: Maritime Art and Galley Slavery in Louis XIV’s France (Getty Research Institute)
- 2022 — Emma Rothschild, An Infinite History: The Story of a Family in France over Three Centuries (Princeton Univ. Press)
- 2021 — Susan North, Sweet & Clean? Bodies and Clothes in Early Modern England (Oxford Univ. Press)
- 2020 — Margaret E. Schotte, Sailing School: Navigating Science and Skill, 1550–1800 (Johns Hopkins Univ. Press)
- 2019 — Hugh G. Cagle, Assembling the Tropics: Science and Medicine in Portugal’s Empire, 1450-1700 (Cambridge Univ. Press)
- 2018 — James Delbourgo, Collecting the World: Hans Sloane and the Origins of the British Museum (Belknap Press).
- 2017 — Renaud Morieux, The Channel: England, France and the Construction of a Maritime Border in the 18th Century (Cambridge Univ. Press)
- 2016 — Alexandra Shepard, Accounting for Oneself: Worth, Status, and the Social Order in Early Modern England (Oxford Univ. Press)
- 2015 — John C. Rule and Ben Trotter, A World of Paper: Louis XIV, Colbert de Torcy, and the Rise of the Information State (McGill-Queens Univ. Press)
- 2014 — Andy Wood, The Memory of the People: Custom and Popular Senses of the Past in Early Modern England
- 2013 — Daniela Bleichmar, Visible Empire: Botanical Expeditions and Visual Culture in the Hispanic Enlightenment
- 2012 — Ethan Shagan, The Rule of Moderation: Violence, Religion and the Politics of Restraint in Early Modern England
- 2011 — Alexandra Walsham, The Reformation of the Landscape: Religion, Identity, and Memory in Early Modern Britain and Ireland
- 2010 — Francesca Trivellato, The Familiarity of Strangers: The Sephardic Diaspora, Livorno, and Cross-Cultural Trade in the Early Modern Period
- 2009 — Stuart B. Schwartz, All Can Be Saved: Religious Tolerance and Salvation in the Iberian Atlantic World
- 2008 — Anne Goldgar, Tulipmania: Money, Honor, and Knowledge in the Dutch Golden Age
- 2007 — Richard B. Sher, The Enlightenment and the Book: Scottish Authors and Their Publishers in 18th-Century Britain, Ireland, and America
- 2006 — Howard G. Brown, Ending the French Revolution: Violence, Justice and Repression from the Terror to Napoleon
- 2005 — Pamela H. Smith, The Body of the Artisan: Art and Experience in the Scientific Revolution
- 2004 — Ronald B. Schechter, Obstinate Hebrews: Representations of Jews in France, 1715-1815
- 2003 — Joseph Eyitemi Inikori, Africans and the Industrial Revolution in England: A Study in International Trade and Economic Development
- 2002 — David A. Bell, The Cult of the Nation in France: Inventing Nationalism, 1680-1800
- 2001 — Jonathan Israel, The Radical Enlightenment: Philosophy and the Making of Modernity, 1650-1750
- 2000 — Ruth Mackay, The Limits of Royal Authority: Resistance and Obedience in 17th-Century Castile
- 1999 — Adrian Johns, The Nature of the Book: Print and Knowledge in the Making
- 1998 — Carla Rahn Phillips and William D. Phillips, Spain's Golden Fleece: Wool Production and the Wool Trade from the Middle Ages to the 19th Century
- 1997 — Timothy Tackett, Becoming a Revolutionary: The Deputies of the French National Assembly and the Emergence of a Revolutionary Culture, 1789-90
- 1996 — Isabel Hull, Sexuality, State, and Civil Society in Germany, 1700-1815
- 1995 — J. Russell Major, From Renaissance Monarchy to Absolute Monarchy: French Kings, Nobles, and Estates
- 1994 — Isser Woloch, The New Regime: Transformations of the French Civic Order, 1789-1820s
- 1993 — Jonathan Dewald, Aristocratic Experience and the Origins of Modern Culture: France, 1570-1715
- 1992 — Joseph M. Levine, The Battle of the Books: History and Literature in the Augustan Age
- 1991 — Helen Nader, Liberty in Absolutist Spain: The Habsburg Sale of Towns, 1516-1700
- 1990 — Richard Herr, Rural Change and Royal Finances in Spain at the End of the Old Regime
- 1989 — Nancy Nichols Barker, Brother to the Sun King: Philippe, Duke of Orléans
- 1988 — Roy Porter, Mind-Forg'd Manacles: A History of Madness in England from the Restoration to the Regency
- 1987 — Carla Rahn Phillips, Six Galleons for the King of Spain: Imperial Defense in the Early 17th Century
- 1986 — John M. Beattie, Crime and the Courts in England, 1660-1800
- 1985 — J.H. Elliott, Richelieu and Olivares
- 1983 — Marianne Elliott, Partners in Revolution: The United Irishmen and France
- 1981 — Richard S. Westfall, Never At Rest: A Biography of Isaac Newton
- 1979 — Robert Darnton, The Business of Enlightenment: A Publishing History of the Encyclopédie, 1775-1800
- 1977 — Simon Schama, Patriots and Liberators: Revolution in the Netherlands, 1780-1813

== See also ==
- List of history awards
