= Ryan Brown =

Ryan Brown may refer to:

== Musicians ==
- Ryan Brown (conductor) (born 1958), American conductor of Opera Lafayette
- Ryan Brown, American rock musician, member of Papa Roach
- Ryan Brown (born 1986), American musician, one of piano playing siblings The 5 Browns

== Others ==
- Ryan Brown (comics) (born 1962), American comics artist
- Ryan Brown (footballer) (born 1985), English footballer
- Ryan J. Brown (born 1991), English actor and screenwriter
- Ryan Brown (runner), winner of the 2007 800 meters at the NCAA Division I Indoor Track and Field Championships

== See also ==
- Ryan Browne (disambiguation)
