= Eldershaw =

Eldershaw is a surname. Notable people with the surname include:

- Flora Eldershaw (1897–1956), Australian novelist, critic and historian

- M. Barnard Eldershaw, pseudonym used by Australian literary collaborators Marjorie Barnard and Flora Eldershaw

- Simon Eldershaw (born 1983), English footballer
