= Andrew Sambrook =

English footballer

Andy Sambrook
Personal information
- Full name: Andrew John Sambrook
- Date of birth: 13 July 1979 (age 47)
- Place of birth: Chatham, England
- Height: 5 ft 10 in (1.78 m)
- Position: Defender

Team information
- Current team: Welling United

Youth career
- Gillingham

Senior career*
Years	Team	Apps	(Gls)
1996–2001	Gillingham	1	(0)
2001–2005	Rushden & Diamonds	69	(0)
2005–2008	Grays Athletic	86	(0)
2008	Fisher Athletic	9	(0)
2008–2009	Thurrock	6	(0)
2009	AFC Wimbledon	4	(0)
2009–2012	Welling United		

International career
- England Schoolboys
- * Club domestic league appearances and goals

Andrew John Sambrook (born 13 July 1979) is a former professional footballer who played for a number of lower-league English clubs including Gillingham, Rushden & Diamonds, and Grays Athletic.

== Football career ==
=== Early career ===
Sambrook began his career at Gillingham whilst still in full-time education at Rainham Mark Grammar School. Sambrook won a scholarship to Hartwick College, New York where he combined his football career with further education. Prior to his leaving the UK, he featured for England schoolboys.

=== Professional football career ===
On his return to England, Sambrook signed for Rushden & Diamonds, making over sixty appearances before transferring to Grays Athletic in the summer of 2005. He signed a one-year contract extension at the end of the 2006–07 season.

In April 2007, Sambrook won the "Chairman's Player of the Year" trophy at the annual Grays Athletic awards ceremony.

=== Semi-professional football career ===
Despite being offered a new contract for the 2008–09 season, Sambrook did not re-sign for Grays and subsequently was released. He joined Conference South side Fisher Athletic in July 2008, a move that was to be cut-short by extreme financial difficulties at the club.

Due to these problems Sambrook, along with a handful of other players, was released from Fisher by mutual consent on 10 November 2008 and subsequently signed for Conference South rivals Thurrock.

Less than three months later, on 30 January 2009, Sambrook left Thurrock for AFC Wimbledon. He signed for Welling United in May 2009, at the end of the 2008–09 season, making it his fifth club in under a year.

Sambrook retired from competitive football in July 2010 due to a series of chronic ankle injuries. He is now a junior accountant.

== Honours ==
Rushden & Diamonds

- Football League Third Division: 2002–03

Grays Athletic

- FA Trophy: 2005–06
