= Malcolm Gaskill =

English historian and professor (born 1967)

Professor Malcolm Gaskill FRHistS
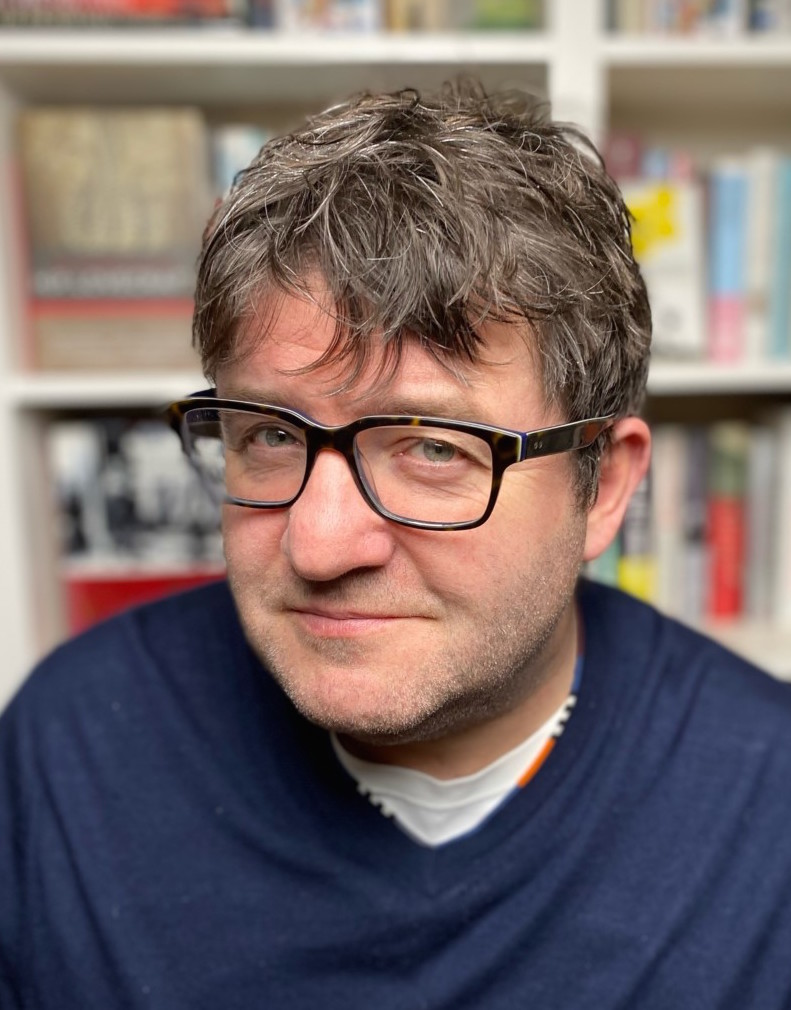
- Born: Malcolm John Gaskill; 22 April 1967 (age 59); Suffolk, England
- Occupations: Historian and academic

Academic background
- Education: Rainham Mark Grammar School
- Alma mater: Robinson College, Cambridge
- Thesis: Attitudes to crime in early modern England: with special reference to witchcraft, coining and murder (1994)
- Doctoral advisor: Keith Wrightson

Academic work
- Discipline: History
- Sub-discipline: Early modern Britain; Social history; Witchcraft; Legal history
- Institutions: Keele University; Queen's University Belfast; Anglia Ruskin University; Churchill College, Cambridge; University of East Anglia

Malcolm John Gaskill FRHistS (born 22 April 1967) is an English academic historian and writer on crime, magic, witchcraft, spiritualism, and the supernatural. Gaskill was a professor in the history department of the University of East Anglia from 2011 until 2020, when he retired from teaching to give more time to writing. In recent years, he has been interested in the history of war and memory, often seen from a personal angle.

== Early life ==
Born in Suffolk, Gaskill grew up in Kent. He was educated at Rainham Mark Grammar School and Robinson College, Cambridge, where he read History. He was subsequently awarded a PhD at Jesus College, Cambridge, with a thesis on attitudes to crime in early modern England supervised by Keith Wrightson.

== Career ==
Gaskill was briefly at Keele University as a lecturer for the year 1993–1994, and then at Queen's University Belfast for the next academic year, before spending four years at Anglia Ruskin University. After that, he joined Churchill College, Cambridge, as a fellow and as Director of History Studies. In 2007, he transferred as a lecturer to the School of History of the University of East Anglia, where he was appointed as a professor in 2011.

In 2010, he was a visiting fellow in North American studies at the British Library, while researching his book Between Two Worlds.

Gaskill's academic interests are in the cultural and social history of Britain and North America, especially the history of crime, magic, and witchcraft, between 1500 and 1800, and in 20th-century spiritualism and supernatural phenomena, with a focus on psychical research from 1920 to 1950. He has written chiefly about the history of witchcraft and witch-hunts.

His book Witchfinders: a Seventeenth-Century English Tragedy (2006) is a study of the witch-hunts of 1645–1647 in East Anglia.

While at the University of East Anglia, Gaskill was available to supervise research students interested in social and cultural history in the early modern period in England, especially on topics related to witchcraft and mentalities.

The New York Times called Gaskill's The Ruin of All Witches (2021), about a real life witch hunt in Springfield, Massachusetts, "a riveting history of life in a 17th-century New England frontier town", noting that a man's nightmare had led to his being accused of witchcraft, flowing out of the colonists' isolation stress, disease, and death.

In 2022, the book was shortlisted for a Wolfson History Prize, with the judges calling it "a riveting micro-history, brilliantly set within the broader cultural and social history of witchcraft". By this time, Gaskill was a full-time writer.

His latest book is entitled The Glass Mountain: Escape and Discovery in Wartime Italy, which is based on his great uncle's experiences as a prisoner of war and his subsequent escapes, and the means by which Gaskill uncovered this story. A shift in subject matter for Gaskill, this book nonetheless echoes the historical ghosts in the epilogue of The Ruin of All Witches, and was described by Caroline Moorhead in The Spectator as "a testament to the power of dogged research and to those twists and turns of memory which, however unstable, illuminate and inform the present". The Glass Mountain is also a book about friendship. Some reviewers highlighted Gaskill's fraternal connection with Domenico Bolognese, president of the association dedicated to the memory of Camp 65 - the POW camp where Gaskill's great uncle was held. As Roderick Bailey wrote in The Times Literary Supplement: "The Glass Mountain is promoted as a wartime tale coupled with reflections on history's relationship to truth, but this human bond, together with the pair's moving encounters with the families further north, is easily among the book's richest features. Certainly, it is effective testimony to the power of fellow feeling to cultivate connections across time and borders."

In October 2026, Profile Books will publish a collection of Gaskill's essays and reviews, under the title Worlds of Fear and Wonder: Living with the Supernatural, Past and Present, about which Lucy Worsley has written "Gaskill lifts the veil between past and present better than anyone I know".

== Retirement ==
In 2018, his wife accepted a job in Dublin and he was able to take a year out to look after their children, finding that he did not miss academic life. In May 2020, during the first COVID-19 lockdown, Gaskill settled his early retirement from his teaching position, noting that universities were already "far from the sunlit uplands" and that they seemed to be about to "descend into a dark tunnel". His retirement was complete a few months later, and he explained his disillusion in an article in the London Review of Books.

== Books ==
- Hellish Nell: Last of Britain's Witches (Fourth Estate, April 2001) ISBN 978-1841151090
- The Matthew Hopkins Trials, ed. (London: Pickering and Chatto, 2003: vol. 3 in James Sharpe and Richard M. Golden, eds., Writings on English Witchcraft 1560-1736, 6 vols.
- Crime and Mentalities in Early Modern England (Cambridge University Press, 2000) ISBN 978-0521572750
- Witchfinders: A Seventeenth-Century English Tragedy (John Murray Press, April 2006; Harvard University Press, October 2007) ISBN 978-0719561207
- Witchcraft: A Very Short Introduction (Oxford University Press, 2010) ISBN 978-0199236954
- Between Two Worlds: How the English Became Americans (Basic Civitas Books, 2013; Oxford University Press, 2014) ISBN 978-0199672974
- The Ruin of All Witches: Life and Death in the New World (London: Allen Lane, November 2021) ISBN 978-0241413388
- The Glass Mountain: Escape and Discovery in Wartime Italy (London: Allen Lane, September 2025) ISBN 978-0241622599

== Some other publications ==
- "Witchcraft and power in early modern England: the case of Margaret Moore" in Women, Crime and the Courts in Early Modern England (Routledge, 1994) 125-145
- "Witches and witchcraft prosecutions, 1560-1660" in M. Zell, ed., Early Modern Kent 1540-1640 (Woodbridge: The Boydell Press, 2000) 245-277
- "Witchcraft" in Arthur F. Kinney, David W. Swain, Eugene D. Hill, eds., Tudor England: An Encyclopaedia (Garland Publishing, 2000)
- "Witches and Witnesses in old and New England" in S. Clark, ed., Languages of Witchcraft: Narrative, Ideology and Meaning in Early Modern Culture (Macmillan, 2001) 55-80 26 p
- "Time's Arrows: Context and Anachronism in the History of Mentalities" in Scientia Poetica 10 (December 2006), 237-253
- "Witchcraft, Politics and Memory in Seventeenth-Century England" in The Historical Journal 50, 2 (June 2007), 289-308
- "Witchcraft and evidence in early modern England" in Past and Present 198 (2008), 33-70
- "Witchcraft, emotion and imagination in the English civil war" in J. Newton, J. Bath, eds., Witchcraft and the Act of 1604 (Brill, 2008)
- "The Pursuit of Reality: Recent research into the reality of witchcraft" in The Historical Journal 51, 4 (December 2008), 1069–1088
- "Masculinity and witchcraft in seventeenth-century England" in A. Rowlands, ed., Witchcraft and Masculinities in Early Modern Europe (Palgrave, 2009)
- "Fear made flesh: the English witch-panic of 1645-7" in D. Lemmings, C. Walker, eds., Moral Panics, the Press and the Law in Early Modern England (Palgrave, 2009)
- "Witchcraft and Neighbourliness in Early Modern England" in S. Hindle, ed., Remaking English Society: Social Relations and Social Change in Early Modern England (2013)
- "Little commonwealths II: communities" in K. Wrightson, ed., A Social History of England, 1500-1700 (Cambridge University Press, 2017)
- "Afterword: Passions in Perspective" in L. Kounine, M. Ostling, eds., Emotions in the History of Witchcraft (Basingstoke: Palgrave Studies in the History of Emotions, 2017), 269–279
- "The Fear and Loathing of Witches" in S. Page, M. Wallace, eds., Spellbound: Magic, Ritual and Witchcraft (Ashmolean Museum, 2018)

== Honours ==
- Fellow of the Royal Historical Society
