= Isabel V. Hull =

- Born: Isabel Virginia Hull; 1949 (age 76–77)
- Education: University of Michigan (BA); Yale University (PhD)
- Occupations: Professor, Writer

Isabel Virginia Hull (born 1949) is John Stambaugh Professor Emerita of History and the former chair of the history department at Cornell University. She specializes in German history from 1700 to 1945, with a focus on sociopolitics, political theory, and gender/sexuality. Since January 2006, Hull has served on the editorial board of the Journal of Modern History.

== Education ==
Hull received her B.A. from the University of Michigan in 1970 and her Ph.D. from Yale University in 1978. She teaches courses on European fascism, World War I, German history 1648–present, and international law.

== Research ==
The position for which Hull is best known, embodied in her two most recent books, is that Germany before and during World War I was uniquely indifferent to international law among the great powers, and (contrary to established historiography) that its responsibility for bringing the war about was much greater than that of the Allied powers. In 2014, Hull published A Scrap of Paper: Breaking and Making International Law During the Great War, analyzing the Allied blockade of Germany. The book was criticized by other historians for failing "to take considerations of morality and, perhaps more importantly, legitimacy [of the blockade] into account".

Michael Geyer of the University of Chicago has stated that "Isabel V. Hull is one of the most accomplished German historians and surely the best of her generation," and she has been described by VICE News as "one of America's leading scholars on the role of fascism in history." She is a winner of the Ralph Waldo Emerson Award and the Leo Gershoy Award (1996), is a member of the American Academy of Arts and Sciences and has been a Guggenheim Fellow and an Alexander von Humboldt-Stiftung Research Fellow. In 2013, she was awarded the inaugural International Research Support Prize by the Max Weber Stiftung and the Historisches Kolleg.

== Bibliography ==
=== Books ===
- The Entourage of Kaiser Wilhelm II, 1888–1918. Cambridge: Cambridge University Press. 1982.
- Sexuality, State, and Civil Society in Germany, 1700–1815. Ithaca: Cornell University Press, 1996.
- Absolute Destruction: Military Culture and the Practices of War in Imperial Germany. Ithaca: Cornell University Press, 2005.
- A Scrap of Paper: Breaking and Making International Law During the Great War. Ithaca: Cornell University Press, 2014.

=== Book reviews ===
Year	Review article	Work(s) reviewed
2018	Hull, Isabel (April 26, 2018). "Anything can be rescinded". London Review of Books. 40 (8): 25–26.	Hathaway, Oona & Scott Shapiro (2017). The internationalists and their plan to outlaw war. Allen Lane.
