= Andy Wood (historian) =

British social historian (born 1967)

Andy Wood FBA FRHistS
- Born: 20 January 1967 (age 59)

Academic background
- Education: University of Cambridge; University of York

Academic work
- Discipline: Social history
- Institutions: Durham University

Andy Wood FBA FRHistS (born 20 January 1967) is a British social historian and academic.

Mostly, he works on the early modern period (1500–1800), but his work on folklore has taken him into the mid-twentieth century. His research interests include popular politics, rebellion, popular memory, belief, popular culture, local identity, folklore, migration patterns, urban and rural society, the mid-Tudor crisis, the English Revolution, popular understandings of Renaissance drama, class identities, and local traditions. With his friend John H. Arnold, he co-authored a critique of Ken MacLeod's science-fiction writing. He also has an interest in the history of the British Left in the late twentieth century. His fourth book, The Memory of the People: Custom and Popular Senses of the Past in Early Modern England, won the American Historical Association's Leo Gershoy Award.

Wood holds degrees from the University of York and Cambridge University. He has held fellowships at the Folger Shakespeare Library, the Huntington Library and the Institute of Historical Research. He is Professor of Social History at Durham University.

He is an elected Fellow of the Royal Historical Society (FRHistS). In 2022, he was elected a Fellow of the British Academy (FBA), the United Kingdom's national academy for the humanities and social sciences.

== Books ==
- Faith, Hope and Charity: English Neighbourhoods, 1500-1640 (Cambridge University Press, 2020).
- The memory of the people : custom and popular senses of the past in early modern England. Cambridge, United Kingdom/New York: Cambridge University Press. 2013. ISBN 9780521896108. OCLC 830837503.
- The 1549 rebellions and the making of early modern England. Cambridge, UK New York: Cambridge University Press. 2007. ISBN 9780511367861. OCLC 192136984.
- Riot, rebellion and popular politics in early modern England. Houndmills, Basingstoke, Hampshire/New York: Palgrave. 2002. ISBN 9781403940384. OCLC 1017880433.
- Wood, Andy (1999). The politics of social conflict : the Peak Country, 1520-1770. New York: Cambridge University Press. doi:10.1017/CBO9780511496134. ISBN 9780511496134. OCLC 49414761.
