= Ryan Browne =

Ryan Browne may refer to:

- Ryan Browne (comics)
- Ryan Browne (American football)

== See also ==
- Ryan Brown (disambiguation)
