= Martin McNeil =

Scottish footballer

Personal information
- Date of birth: 28 September 1980 (age 46)
- Place of birth: Rutherglen, Scotland
- Position: Central defender

Team information
- Current team: Lowestoft Town

Youth career
- 19??–1998: Cambridge United

Senior career*
Years	Team	Apps	(Gls)
1998–2001	Cambridge United	41	(0)
2001–2002	Torquay United	16	(0)
2002	King's Lynn	11	(0)
20??–2003	Fakenham Town		
2003–2005	Wroxham		
2005–2006	King's Lynn	10	(0)
2006–2007	Wisbech Town		
2007–2009	Soham Town Rangers		
2009–	Lowestoft Town		
2010–	King's Lynn Town	28	(2)
- * Club domestic league appearances and goals

Martin McNeil (born 28 September 1980 in Rutherglen) is a Scottish former professional footballer. He played in the football league for Cambridge United and Torquay United. He currently plays for Lowestoft Town.

McNeil began his career as a trainee with Cambridge United, turning professional in August 1998. He made his league debut for Roy McFarland's side on 24 October 1998, playing in a goalless draw at home to Shrewsbury Town. He played in the same team as Alex Russell as Cambridge won promotion, but fell out of favour during the 2000-01 season and was allowed to join McFarland's new side, Torquay United on trial, playing in the 2-0 away win over Newton Abbot on 25 July 2001. He joined Torquay on loan on 9 August 2001, which enabled him to be registered in time to play in the opening game of the season, a 1-0 defeat away to newly relegated Bristol Rovers, later signing a two-year contract. He played the early part of the season with an injury to his pubis bone, similar to that which had kept teammate Chris Brandon out the previous season, eventually succumbing to the need to rest it.

On 4 January 2002, McNeil was sacked by Torquay having been seen drinking alcohol in public houses in Torquay on New Year's Eve. Teammate Christian Hansen, whose loan was terminated at the same time, admitted that he and McNeil had been drinking and had returned to Hansen's hotel at 2.30 am, just over 12 hours before the start of a league game.

In early February 2002, McNeil signed for King's Lynn. He agreed to join Cambridge City on non-contract terms in August 2002, although only days later the offer was withdrawn by City manager Dave Batch.

In July 2003, he left Fakenham Town to join Wroxham.

He returned to King's Lynn in the 2005 close season, eventually leaving in January 2006 when he joined Wisbech Town. He was voted 'player of the year' at Wisbech in 2006 and 2007.

He joined Soham Town Rangers in the 2007 close season, but left in January 2009 to join Lowestoft Town. He then moved back to King's Lynn Town in summer 2010.
