= Richard Herr (historian) =

American historian and hispanist (1922–2022)

- Born: April 7, 1922; Guanajuato, Mexico
- Died: May 29, 2022 (aged 100)
- Occupations: Historian and hispanist

Academic background
- Education: Harvard University (AB 1943); University of Chicago (PhD 1954)

Academic work
- Discipline: Historian
- Sub-discipline: History of Spain; Age of Enlightenment
- Institutions: Yale University (1954–1960); University of California, Berkeley (1960–1991)

Richard Herr (April 7, 1922 – May 29, 2022) was an American historian and hispanist known for his study of the history of Spain in the 18th and 19th centuries and the history of the Age of Enlightenment more generally. He taught at Yale University 1952–1959 and then at the University of California, Berkeley from 1960 to retirement emeritus in 1991. At Berkeley, he led the school programs in Spanish studies and Portuguese studies.

Herr was an elected member of the Spanish Royal Academy of History (1965), the American Academy of Arts and Sciences (1990), and the American Philosophical Society (1993), and he was the winner of awards including two Guggenheim fellowships (1959, 1984), a Bronze Medal of the Collège de France (1985), a Leo Gershoy Award (1990), Comendador of the Order of Isabella the Catholic (1988), and Encomienda de Número in the Order of Civil Merit (2013). He was particularly honored for his books The Eighteenth-Century Revolution in Spain (1958) and Rural Change and Royal Finances in Spain at the End of the Old Regime (1989).

== Early life and education ==
Herr was born on April 7, 1922, in Guanajuato, Mexico, where his father worked as a superintendent of a local silver mine. The family moved to the United States in 1932, where Herr attended Walnut Hills High School in Cincinnati, Ohio. He began attending Harvard University in 1939 and compressed his time to graduate and enlist in the US Army in 1942, receiving his A.B. officially in 1943. He served in the Signal Intelligence Service, where he was stationed in London and then Paris, and he was among the first Americans to see the Buchenwald concentration camp.

After a year of study at the Sorbonne in Paris 1945–1946, in 1948 Herr returned to the US for a PhD from the University of Chicago under the supervision of Louis R. Gottschalk and Robert Roswell Palmer. His dissertation was completed in 1954 and was later published as his first book, The Eighteenth-Century Revolution in Spain (1958), which was well-received by historians in Spain and became a standard book on its subject.

== Career ==
Herr began his teaching career at Yale University, where he taught 1952–1959. In 1960, he moved to the University of California, Berkeley, where he would stay until retiring emeritus in 1991, though he continued to work, to visit, and to teach undergraduates world history well into his nineties. Early at Berkeley, he supported the Free Speech Movement. He both helped to create and chaired Berkeley's programs in Iberian studies (chaired 1987–1991), Portuguese studies (1994–1998), and Spanish studies (2002–2005). On his retirement, he was awarded the Berkeley Citation.

Among his American honors, Herr won two Guggenheim fellowships, one in 1959 and the second in 1984. He won the 1990 Leo Gershoy Award of the American Historical Association for his book Rural Change and Royal Finances in Spain at the End of the Old Regime (1989). He was elected to the American Academy of Arts and Sciences in 1990 and to the American Philosophical Society in 1993.

In international honors, he was the longest serving corresponding member of the Spanish Royal Academy of History (elected 1965); he also received an honorary degree from the Universidad de Alcalá de Henares (2001), a Bronze Medal from the Collège de France (1985), election as Comendador of the Order of Isabella the Catholic (1988), and the rank of Encomienda de Número in the Order of Civil Merit of Spain (2013).

== Personal life and death ==
Before returning to the US from his military service in Europe, Herr met his first wife, Elena Fernández Mel, in Paris where she lived as a refugee from Francoist Spain. They had two sons, Charles and Winship, and later divorced in 1966.

After his divorce, he married Valerie Shaw, a British-born demographer and Berkeley alumna, in 1968. With her he had two daughters, Sarah and Jane. He wrote two family memoirs with Sarah, Our Family: The Winships and the Herrs (2010) and After the Gold Rushes Ended: The Story of Irving and Luella (2020). He also collaborated on a book of family history with his brother Robert Woodmansee Herr, An American Family in the Mexican Revolution (1999). He became a lifetime member of Clare Hall, Cambridge, after a sabbatical there 1984–1985, and then spent 25 summers visiting with his wife in a cottage in Girton, Cambridgeshire. Valerie and Richard remained married until his death.

Herr died on May 29, 2022. In September of 2022, the Royal Academy of History of Spain held a celebration of his life.

== Selected works ==
=== Books ===
- The Eighteenth-Century Revolution in Spain (1958)
- Tocqueville and the Old Regime (1962)
- An Historical Essay on Modern Spain (1974)
- Rural Change and Royal Finances in Spain at the End of the Old Regime (1989)
- Separate but Equal? Individual and Community Since the Enlightenment (2016)
