= Levi Reid =

English footballer

Personal information
- Full name: Levi Stanley Junior Reid
- Date of birth: 19 December 1983 (age 42)
- Place of birth: Stafford, England
- Height: 5 ft 5 in (1.65 m)
- Position: Midfielder

Team information
- Current team: Brocton

Youth career
- 2002–2003: Port Vale

Senior career*
Years	Team	Apps	(Gls)
2003–2005	Port Vale	42	(0)
2005–2007	Stafford Rangers	36	(1)
2007–2008	Macclesfield Town	31	(2)
2008–2009	Oxford United	10	(2)
2009–2011	Stafford Rangers		
2011–2012	Telford United	1	(0)
2011–2012	→ Chasetown (loan)	5	(0)
2012	Gainsborough Trinity	27	(4)
2012–2018	Stafford Rangers		
2019–2020	Chasetown	13	(0)
2020	Stafford Rangers	2	(0)
2022–2023	Gresley Rovers		
2026–	Brocton	3	(0)
- * Club domestic league appearances and goals

Levi Stanley Junior Reid (born 19 December 1983) is an English footballer who plays as a midfielder for Midland League Premier Division club Brocton.

Reid played for Port Vale between 2003 and 2005 before dropping into non-League football with Stafford Rangers. He signed with Macclesfield Town, but moved on to Oxford United the following year. In 2009, he returned to Rangers for another two years. He signed with Telford United in March 2011 before joining Gainsborough Trinity in January 2012 following a loan spell at Chasetown. He returned to Stafford Rangers in October 2012 and helped the club to win the Northern Premier League Division One South in 2015–16. He later played for Chasetown, Gresley Rovers and Brocton. His brother, Izak Reid, is a professional footballer – the pair played together at Macclesfield.

== Career ==
=== Port Vale ===
Reid started his career at Port Vale, rising from the youth ranks to make his first-team debut on the last day of the 2002–03 season, a 2–0 defeat at Bristol City. He came on as a 65th-minute substitute, replacing the veteran John Durnin. He made his full debut on 8 November 2003, in an embarrassing 2–2 draw with non-League Ford United at Vale Park, during an FA Cup first round encounter. Reid made 14 appearances in the 2003–04 season. A regular in the first-team throughout the 2004–05 season, he scored his first senior goal in an FA Cup tie with Kidderminster Harriers on 12 November. He was released in May 2005 by manager Martin Foyle, having made 49 appearances for the "Valiants" in all competitions. At his trial for affray later that year, his defence team stated that he had been released from his contract due to his part in a nightclub brawl.

=== Non-League ===
Joining Stafford Rangers, his strike in the Conference North play-off final penalty shoot-out booked Rangers a place in the Conference National for the 2006–07 season. Rangers struggled to adapt to their new division in 2006–07, though Reid was a regular in the latter half of the season. Reid made his return to the English Football League in 2007–08, joining Macclesfield Town on trial, who were managed by his former teammate Ian Brightwell. He impressed at the season's start and was offered a four-month deal. Enjoying regular football for the League Two club, he signed an end-of-season deal in December. In August 2008 he joined Oxford United on trial, alongside former Macclesfield teammate Michael Husbands. Reid was given a six-month contract with Oxford, but left late in September 2008 to help care for his sick baby back in Stafford.

In August 2009, he re-signed with Stafford Rangers. At the end of the 2009–10 campaign, he left the club to search for full-time football, but returned to Rangers after his search was unsuccessful. Rangers were relegated out of the Conference North at the end of the 2010–11 season. Reid won a short-term deal at Telford United in March. Telford won the Conference North play-offs to seal a place in the Conference National, and though Reid failed to make a first-team appearance he was still invited back to the club in the summer to try to prove himself worthy of a new deal. In September 2011, he was loaned out to Chasetown of the Northern Premier League Premier Division. He made 11 appearances for the "Scholars", scoring one goal.

On 3 January 2012, he joined Conference North side Gainsborough Trinity. Steve Housham's side qualified for the play-offs with a fourth-place finish in 2011–12, but lost 1–0 to Nuneaton Town in the final. Reid was not amongst those players retained at the end of the season and thus departed The Northolme. He joined up with Stafford Rangers, now of the Northern Premier League, for a third time in October 2012. The club finished 15th in 2012–13, before being relegated at the end of the 2013–14 season. Rangers ended the 2014–15 season outside the Division One South play-offs on goal difference. They won promotion as champions in the 2015–16 season, and Reid was voted Players' Player of the Year and Directors' Player of the Year. Rangers finished 13th in the Northern Premier League Premier Division in 2016–17 and then 14th in 2017–18. He played 24 games for Gresley Rovers between January 2022 and January 2023.

== Personal life ==
His younger brother, Izak Reid, is a professional footballer – the pair played together at Macclesfield Town.

== Career statistics ==
Appearances and goals by club, season and competition
Club	Season	League			FA Cup		Other		Total	
Club	Season	Division	Apps	Goals	Apps	Goals	Apps	Goals	Apps	Goals
Port Vale	2002–03	Second Division	1	0	0	0	0	0	1	0
Port Vale	2003–04	Second Division	11	0	3	0	0	0	14	0
Port Vale	2004–05	League One	30	0	2	1	2	0	34	1
Port Vale	Total		42	0	5	1	2	0	49	1
Stafford Rangers	2007–08	Conference National	13	1	0	0	0	0	13	1
Macclesfield Town	2007–08	League Two	31	2	1	0	3	0	35	2
Oxford United	2008–09	Conference National	10	2	0	0	0	0	10	2
Stafford Rangers	2010–11	Conference North	27	1	0	0	0	0	27	1
Chasetown (loan)	2011–12	Northern Premier League; Premier Division	5	0	1	0	5	1	11	1
Gainsborough Trinity	2011–12	Conference North	2	0	0	0	0	0	2	0
Chasetown	2019–20	Northern Premier League; South East Division	13	0	4	1	3	0	20	1
Stafford Rangers	2019–20	Northern Premier League; Premier Division	2	0	0	0	0	0	2	0
Gresley Rovers	2022–23	Northern Premier League; Midlands Division	14	0	1	0	0	0	15	0
Brocton	2026–27	Midland League; Premier Division	3	0	0	0	1	0	3	0

== Honours ==
Stafford Rangers

- Conference North play-offs: 2005–06
- Northern Premier League Division One South: 2015–16
