= Christian Hanson (footballer) =

English footballer (born 1981)

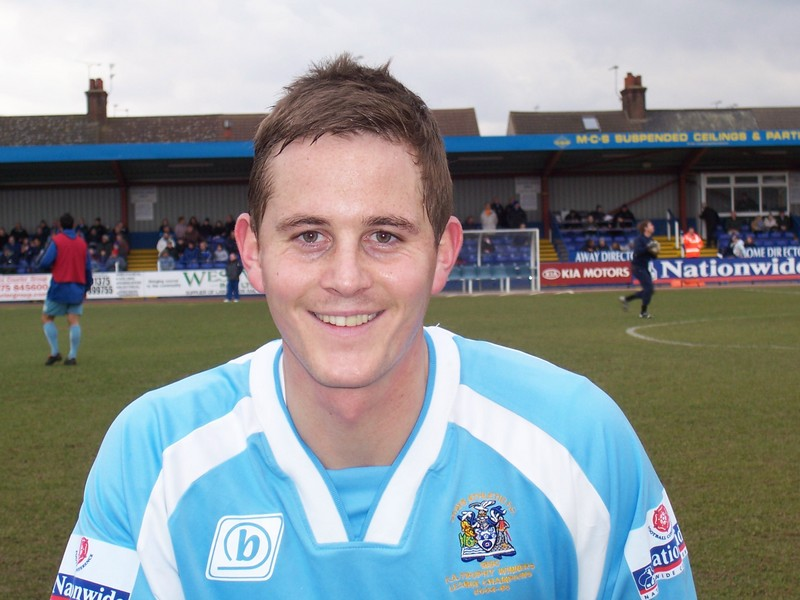
- Hanson as a Grays Athletic player.

Personal information
- Full name: Christian Hanson
- Date of birth: 3 August 1981 (age 45)
- Place of birth: Middlesbrough, England
- Height: 6 ft 1 in (1.85 m)
- Position: Defender

Youth career
- Middlesbrough

Senior career*
Years	Team	Apps	(Gls)
2000–2002	Middlesbrough	0	(0)
2001	→ Cambridge United (loan)	8	(0)
2001–2002	→ Torquay United (loan)	6	(0)
2002	Spennymoor United		
2002–2003	Havant & Waterlooville	19	(1)
2003	Billingham Town		
2003–2004	Spennymoor United	29	(2)
2004	Billingham Synthonia	20	(0)
2004–2005	Port Vale	5	(0)
2005	Billingham Synthonia	6	(0)
2005	Dunston Federation Brewery		
2005	Leyton Orient	2	(0)
2006	Grays Athletic	19	(0)
2006–2007	Gateshead	21	(1)
2007	Spennymoor Town		
2007–2008	Billingham Synthonia	37	(0)
2009–??	Whitby Town		
- * Club domestic league appearances and goals

Christian Hanson (born 3 August 1981) is an English former footballer. A left-footed central defender, he represented England at schools and youth level. He played for a host of non-League clubs, and picked up his greatest honour by winning the FA Trophy with Grays Athletic in 2006. Once contracted to Middlesbrough, he played a handful of games in the Football League for Cambridge United, Torquay United, Port Vale, and Leyton Orient.

== Career ==
Hanson began his career as a trainee with his local club, Middlesbrough, turning professional in August 2000. His development was interrupted by injury and he joined Cambridge United on loan on 22 March 2001, making his Second Division debut on 31 March in a 4–1 defeat away to Peterborough United. He played eight games for the club before returning to the Riverside Stadium. On 5 September 2001, he played as a triallist for Grimsby Town reserves against Blackpool reserves and later in the month joined Portsmouth on trial, but neither trial spell led to a permanent move.

In November 2001, Hanson joined Torquay United on an initial one-month loan, prompting manager Roy McFarland to revert to a 4–4–2 formation to allow Hanson to make his Torquay debut the following day in a 2–0 defeat against Halifax Town at The Shay. After a total of six Third Division games, Torquay cancelled his loan deal on 4 January, after Hanson admitted going out drinking alcohol in Torquay on New Year's Eve with several teammates, the night before a league match; Torquay defender Martin McNeil was sacked by the club at the same time for the same reason. He returned to Middlesbrough, but was released at the end of the season, joining non-League side Spennymoor United after trials with Sheffield United, Portsmouth and Bristol Rovers.

He joined Havant & Waterlooville in October 2002, as cover for the injured Liam Daish, and was regular for the remainder of the season. He moved back to the North-East of England, joining Billingham Town at the end of the season. He then moved back to Spennymoor United in October 2003, but joined Billingham Synthonia for the 2004–05 season.

He returned to the Football League in December 2004 when he joined Port Vale, having been on trial with Oxford United the previous month. He played just five League One games for Martin Foyle's "Valiants", and was released at the end of the season. He had a trial with Leyton Orient before rejoining Billingham Synthonia in August 2005, moving to Dunston Federation Brewery in late September 2005.

He joined Martin Ling's Leyton Orient, initially on non-contract terms, in October 2005. He scored on his debut in a Football League Trophy tie against Yeovil Town. However, he made just two league appearances, both as a substitute and was released in January 2006, at which point he joined Mark Stimson's Grays Athletic. He played for the "Gravelmen" in the FA Trophy final at Upton Park in 2006, when they beat Woking 2–0. Grays released him in May 2006 despite being a first-team regular at the club. Hanson featured in Chester City's 2–0 loss to Stoke City in a friendly on 11 July 2006. He joined Gateshead in August 2006, but was transfer-listed in January 2007. Having played 31 games for the "Tynesiders" in 2006–07, he left the Gateshead International Stadium. He returned to Spennymoor before the end of the season, helping them to promotion to the Northern League Division One.

He rejoined Billingham Synthonia in August 2007, and was a regular in their Northern League side. He played for Whitby Town of the Northern Premier League Premier Division in the 2009–10 season.

== Career statistics ==
Appearances and goals by club, season and competition
Club	Season	League			FA Cup		Other		Total	
Club	Season	Division	Apps	Goals	Apps	Goals	Apps	Goals	Apps	Goals
Cambridge United (loan)	2000–01	Second Division	8	0	0	0	0	0	8	0
Torquay United (loan)	2001–02	Third Division	6	0	0	0	0	0	6	0
Billingham Synthonia	2004–05	Northern League Division One	20	0	2	0	1 (Note: Appearance(s) in the Durham Challenge Cup)	0	23	0
Port Vale	2004–05	League One	5	0	0	0	0	0	5	0
Billingham Synthonia	2005–06	Northern League Division One	6	0	3	0	1 (Note: Appearance(s) in the JRC Cup)	0	10	0
Leyton Orient	2005–06	League Two	2	0	0	0	2 (Note: Appearance(s) in the Football League Trophy)	1	4	1
Gateshead	2006–07	Northern Premier League Premier Division	21	1	2	0	8	0	31	1
Billingham Synthonia	2007–08	Northern League Division One	37	0	2	0	6 (Note: 2 appearances in the FA Vase, 2 appearances in the League cup, 2 appearances in the Durham Challenge Cup)	0	45	0

== Honours ==
Grays Athletic

- FA Trophy: 2006
