= Keith Wrightson =

English historian

Keith Wrightson FBA FRHistS
- Born: Keith Edwin Wrightson; 22 March 1948 (age 78); Croxdale, England

Academic background
- Education: Dame Allan's Boys' School, Newcastle upon Tyne
- Alma mater: Fitzwilliam College, Cambridge (BA, PhD)

Academic work
- Discipline: History
- Institutions: Fitzwilliam College, Cambridge; University of St Andrews; Jesus College, Cambridge; Yale University
- Doctoral students: Malcolm Gaskill; Alexandra Shepard

Keith Edwin Wrightson, FBA, FRHistS (born 22 March 1948) is an English historian who specialises in early modern England.

== Early life and education ==
Wrightson was born on 22 March 1948 in Croxdale, County Durham, England. He was educated at Dame Allan's School, an all-boys private school in Newcastle upon Tyne, England. He studied history at Fitzwilliam College, Cambridge, graduating with a Bachelor of Arts (BA) degree in 1970 and a Doctor of Philosophy (PhD) degree in 1974. His doctoral thesis was titled "The Puritan reformation of manners, with special reference to the counties of Lancashire and Essex, 1640-1660".

== Academic career ==
Wrightson began his academic career as a research fellow in history at Fitzwilliam College from 1972 to 1975. He then moved to the University of St Andrews where he was a lecturer in modern history from 1975 to 1984. He returned to Cambridge in 1984 having been elected a fellow of Jesus College and appointed a university lecturer in history. He was promoted to Reader in English Social History in 1993 and to Professor of Social History in 1998.

Wrightson has taught at the University of St Andrews, University of Cambridge and Yale University.

Wrightson is currently the Randolph W. Townsend Professor of History at Yale University.

== Honours ==
In 1996, Wrightson was elected a Fellow of the British Academy (FBA), the United Kingdom's national academy for the humanities and social sciences. He is also an elected Fellow of the Royal Historical Society (FRHistS). Wrightson was formerly the President of the North American Conference on British Studies. Wrightson is the recipient of the John Ben Snow Prize.

== Bibliography ==
His notable books include:

- Wrightson, Keith; Levine, David (1979). Poverty and Piety in an English Village: Terling, 1525-1700. Cambridge [USA]: Academic Press. ISBN 0127659501. OCLC 892233165.
- Wrightson, Keith (2003). English society, 1580-1680 ([New ed.] ed.). London: Routledge. ISBN 0415290686. OCLC 56469270.
- Wrightson, Keith (2011). Ralph Tailor's summer : a scrivener, his city, and the plague. New Haven: Yale University Press. ISBN 9780300177596. OCLC 779173279.
- Wrightson, Keith (2002). Earthly necessities : economic lives in early modern Britain, 1470-1750. London: Penguin. ISBN 0140250018. OCLC 48931119.
- A Social History of England, 1500-1750
- Rank : picturing the social order 1516-2009. Sunderland: Northern Gallery for Contemporary Art. 2009. ISBN 9780954911935. OCLC 368068543.
- Levine, David; Wrightson, Keith (1991). The making of an industrial society : Whickham, 1560-1765. Oxford [England]: Clarendon Press. ISBN 0198200668. OCLC 21874514.
