= Ryan Brown (footballer) =

English footballer

Personal information
- Full name: Ryan Anthony Brown
- Date of birth: 15 March 1985 (age 41)
- Place of birth: Stoke-on-Trent, England
- Height: 5 ft 10 in (1.78 m)
- Position: Left-back

Youth career
- 1994–2003: Port Vale

Senior career*
Years	Team	Apps	(Gls)
2003–2005	Port Vale	38	(0)
2005–2006	Leek Town	39	(2)
2006–2010	Northwich Victoria		
2010	→ Altrincham (loan)	17	(0)
2010–2012	Altrincham	33	(0)
2012–2013	Stafford Rangers		
2013–2014	Leek Town	1	(0)
2014–201?	Kidsgrove Athletic		
- * Club domestic league appearances and goals

Ryan Anthony Brown (born 15 March 1985) is an English former footballer who played as a left-back.

Starting his professional career with Port Vale in 2003, he played 44 first-team games before being released shortly after his 20th birthday. He spent a season with Leek Town before he switched to Northwich Victoria. He spent four years with Victoria before switching to Altrincham in 2010. He switched to Stafford Rangers in January 2012 before returning to Leek Town in November 2013. He signed with Kidsgrove Athletic in October 2014.

== Career ==
Signed up to the Port Vale youth team since age nine, he made his senior debut for the club against Bristol City on 3 May 2003. He turned professional at Vale Park under Brian Horton three months later. He sustained a head injury that required 16 stitches and three operations following a collision against Queens Park Rangers in March 2004. After a further 41 appearances in league and cup games, he was released by manager Martin Foyle in May 2005 after slipping below Craig James in the first-team pecking order. Following a season in the Northern Premier League Premier Division with Leek Town, he was signed by Conference National newcomers Northwich Victoria in June 2006. In April 2008 he signed a two-year extension to his contract. However, he was soon transfer listed and told he had no future at the club, though in October 2008 the club's leadership changed their mind on this matter. At the end of the season Victoria were relegated back into the Conference North.

With Northwich facing expulsion to the Northern Premier League, in February 2010, Brown joined Conference club Altrincham on loan, and the switch was made permanent in the summer. He suffered relegation with the club at the end of the 2010–11 season, which left both he and the club in the Conference North for the 2011–12 campaign. Outside of football, he worked as an engineer in his native Stoke. In January 2012, he left Altrincham to sign for Stafford Rangers of the Northern Premier League Premier Division. Rangers finished 16th in 2011–12 and 15th in 2012–13. He re-signed with Leek Town, now in the Northern Premier League Division One South, in November 2013. He helped the "Blues" to a third-place finish in 2013–14, securing a place in the play-offs, where they were knocked out by Belper Town at Harrison Park. He joined league rivals Kidsgrove Athletic in October 2014. The "Grove" finished 20th in the Northern Premier League Division One South in the 2014–15 campaign, 15th in the 2015–16 season, 12th in the 2016–17 season and 18th in the 2017–18 season.

== Career statistics ==
Appearances and goals by club, season and competition
Club	Season	League			FA Cup		Other		Total	
Club	Season	Division	Apps	Goals	Apps	Goals	Apps	Goals	Apps	Goals
Port Vale	2002–03	Second Division	1	0	0	0	0	0	1	0
Port Vale	2003–04	Second Division	17	0	0	0	1	0	18	0
Port Vale	2004–05	League One	20	0	2	0	3	0	25	0
Port Vale	Total		38	0	2	0	4	0	44	0
Leek Town	2005–06	Northern Premier League; Premier Division	39	2	4	0	6	0	49	2
Northwich Victoria	2006–07	Conference National	23	0	1	0	0	0	24	0
Northwich Victoria	2007–08	Conference National	32	0	0	0	0	0	32	1
Altrincham	2009–10	Conference National	17	0	0	0	0	0	17	0
Altrincham	2010–11	Conference National	33	0	0	0	6	1	39	1
Altrincham	Total		50	0	0	0	6	1	56	1
Leek Town	2013–14	Northern Premier League; Division One South	1	0	0	0	0	0	1	0
