= 2005–06 FA Trophy =

FA Challenge Trophy

Tournament details
- Country: England; Wales
- Teams: 220

Final positions
- Champions: Grays Athletic
- Runners-up: Woking

The 2005–06 FA Trophy was the thirty-sixth season of the FA Trophy.

Grays Athletic defended their trophy, only the fourth time this has been achieved in the competition's history.

== 1st qualifying round ==
=== Ties ===
Tie	Home team	Score	Away team
1	Warrington Town	1–1	Frickley Athletic
2	North Ferriby United	1–1	Prescot Cables
3	Rossendale United	0–1	Woodley Sports
4	Guiseley	3–1	Chorley
5	Farsley Celtic	2–0	Runcorn F C Halton
6	Wakefield-Emley	0–5	Fleetwood Town
7	Mossley	3–2	Shepshed Dynamo
8	Witton Albion	1–1	A F C Telford United
9	Bradford Park Avenue	1–1	Gateshead
10	Blyth Spartans	2–0	Belper Town
11	Bamber Bridge	2–2	Grantham Town
12	Burscough	3–3	Leek Town
13	Kidsgrove Athletic	3–1	Ashton United
14	Brigg Town	0–1	Matlock Town
15	Radcliffe Borough	1–2	Marine
16	Clitheroe	3–1	Spalding United
17	Ossett Albion	0–4	Kendal Town
18	Ossett Town	1–1	Stocksbridge Park Steels
19	Lincoln United	2–1	Colwyn Bay
20	Whitby Town	4–2	Eastwood Town
21	Gresley Rovers	2–2	Ilkeston Town
22	Bashley	0–3	Mossley
23	Enfield Town	3–0	Berkhamsted Town
24	Metropolitan Police	4–1	Maldon Town
25	Dover Athletic	1–1	Dartford
26	Barton Rovers	3–2	Potters Bar Town
27	AFC Wimbledon	1–0	King's Lynn
28	Leyton	1–0	Arlesey Town
29	Enfield	1–2	Fleet Town
30	Folkestone Invicta	1–1	Whyteleafe
31	Walton Casuals	0–1	Harlow Town
32	Slough Town	1–3	Croydon Athletic
33	Chelmsford City	6–0	Horsham
34	Waltham Forest	0–1	Burgess Hill Town
35	Kingstonian	2–2	Aveley
36	Northwood	2–4	Ramsgate
37	Sittingbourne	3–0	Chatham Town
38	Staines Town	2–0	Wivenhoe Town
39	Tonbridge Angels	1–0	Cheshunt
40	Leatherhead	0–1	East Thurrock United
41	Braintree Town	4–2	Great Wakering Rovers
42	Rothwell Town	3–1	Molesey
43	Heybridge Swifts	3–0	Walton & Hersham
44	Billericay Town	1–0	Wingate & Finchley
45	Corinthian-Casuals	1–4	Stamford
46	Lymington & New Milton	0–4	Worthing
47	Hastings United	0–0	Corby Town
48	Hampton & Richmond Borough	0–2	Newport I O W
49	Banstead Athletic	1–2	Redbridge
50	Boreham Wood	1–0	Ilford
51	Dulwich Hamlet	1–1	Barking & East Ham United
52	Windsor & Eton	1–2	Uxbridge
53	Tooting & Mitcham United	1–2	Wealdstone
54	Fisher Athletic London	4–2	Hendon
55	Ashford Town (Kent)	0–2	Bromley
56	Team Bath	0–1	Hitchin Town
57	Thame United	0–5	Aylesbury United
58	Halesowen Town	0–0	Willenhall Town
59	Tiverton Town	0–0	Mangotsfield United
60	Cindeford Town	1–1	Chippenham Town
61	Dunstable Town	2–2	Bath City
62	Cirencester Town	2–0	Gloucester City
63	Evesham United	0–2	Solihull Borough
64	Brackley Town	1–1	Banbury United
65	Stourport Swifts	0–1	Bedworth United
66	Paulton Rovers	1–1	Salisbury City
67	Clevedon Town	2–1	Taunton Town
68	Hemel Hempstead Town	1–1	Swindon Supermarine
69	Merthyr Tydfil	0–3	Rushall Olympic
70	Leighton Town	2–1	Rugby Town
71	Bromsgrove Rovers	3–2	Beaconsfield S Y C O B
72	Sutton Coldfield Town	2–1	Chesham United
73	Marlow	1–2	Ashford Town (Middx)
74	Burnham	2–0	Yate Town
75	Bedford Town	3–0	Bracknell Town

=== Replays ===
Tie	Home team	Score	Away team
1	Frickley Athletic	1–1	Warrington Town
	(Warrington Town won 5–4 on penalties)		
2	Prescot Cables	2–2	North Ferriby United
	(Prescot Cables won 4–3 on penalties)		
8	A F C Telford United	2–1	Witton Albion
9	Gateshead	4–3	Bradford Park Avenue
11	Grantham Town	3–0	Bamber Bridge
12	Leek Town	1–3	Burscough
18	Stocksbridge Park Steels	2–2	Ossett Town
	(Ossett Town won 4–1 on penalties)		
21	Ilkeston Town	2–3	Gresly Rovers
25	Dartford	3–2	Dover Athletic
30	Whyteleafe	1–2	Folkestone Invicta
35	Aveley	0–1	Kingstonian
47	Corby Town	2–0	Hastings United
51	Barking & East Ham United	2–0	Dulwich Hamlet
58	Willenhall Town	2–3	Halesowen Town
59	Mangotsfield United	1–2	Tiverton Town
60	Chippenham Town	3–1	Cinderford Town
61	Bath City	5–0	Dunstable Town
64	Banbury United	3–0	Brackley Town
66	Salisbury City	3–1	Paulton Rovers
68	Swindon Supermarine	0–1	Hemel Hempstead Town

== 2nd qualifying round ==
=== Ties ===
Tie	Home team	Score	Away team
1	Blyth Spartans	2–0	Whitby Town
2	Gresley Rovers	1–4	Mossley
3	Bishop Auckland	1–3	Woodley Sports
4	Ossett Town	2–2	Clitheroe
5	Burscough	1–2	Fleetwood Town
6	Grantham Town	2–1	Lincoln United
7	Guiseley	2–2	Kendal Town
8	Gateshead	1–0	Kidsgrove Athletic
	(Gateshead removed for fielding ineligible player)		
9	Marine	2–1	Matlock Town
10	A F C Telford United	1–1	Goole
11	Prescot Cables	1–2	Farsley Celtic
12	Bridlington Town	2–2	Warrington Town
13	Harlow Town	2–1	Barton Rovers
14	Boreham Wood	4–1	Bromley
15	Fleet Town	0–1	Kingstonian
16	Barking & East Ham United	4–1	Burgess Hill Town
17	Cray Wanderers	4–3	Staines Town
18	Folkestone Invicta	5–3	Wealdstone
19	Enfield Town	1–1	Redbridge
20	Sittingbourne	1–0	Corby Town
21	Harrow Borough	4–2	Metropolitan Police
22	Margate	0–1	Dartford
23	Tonbridge Angels	2–1	Newport I O W
24	East Thurrock United	2–1	Leyton
25	Croydon Athletic	2–2	Rothwell Town
26	Heybridge Swifts	2–1	Billericay Town
27	Chelmsford City	0–2	Braintree Town
28	Fisher Athletic London	1–2	Uxbridge
29	Worthing	1–1	Stamford
30	Ramsgate	1–1	AFC Wimbledon
31	Salisbury City	2–1	Clevedon Town
32	Hemel Hempstead Town	2–3	Chippenham Town
33	Burnham	4–5	Leighton Town
34	Rushall Olympic	3–4	Ashford Town (Middx)
35	Hitchin Town	1–2	Bedford Town
36	Solihull Borough	3–1	Tiverton Town
37	Halesowen Town	2–0	Aylesbury United
38	Banbury United	2–2	Cirencester Town
39	Bedworth United	2–5	Sutton Coldfield Town
40	Bath City	2–0	Bromsgrove Rovers

=== Replays ===
Tie	Home team	Score	Away team
4	Clitheroe	1–1	Ossett Town
	(Clitheroe won 5–4 on penalties)		
7	Kendal Town	4–0	Guiseley
10	Goole	0–1	A F C Telford United
12	Warrington Town	1–0	Bridlington Town
19	Redbridge	2–1	Enfield Town
25	Rothwell Town	0–1	Croydon Athletic
29	Stamford	2–0	Worthing
30	AFC Wimbledon	2–1	Ramsgate
38	Cirencester Town	3–4	Banbury United

== 3rd qualifying round ==
The teams from Conference North and Conference South entered in this round.

=== Ties ===
Tie	Home team	Score	Away team
1	Leigh R M I	1–4	Stafford Rangers
2	Vauxhall Motors	2–1	Mossley
3	Droylsden	4–0	Grantham Town
4	Worksop Town	1–1	A F C Telford United
5	Fleetwood Town	1–3	Alfreton Town
6	Hucknall Town	0–0	Northwich Victoria
7	Redditch United	1–1	Barrow
8	Lancaster City	0–0	Workington
9	Kettering Town	1–0	Gainsborough Trinity
10	Hinckley United	2–2	Histon
11	Farsley Celtic	3–1	Nuneaton Borough
12	Marine	0–1	Blyth Spartans
13	Solihull Borough	1–0	Harrogate Town
14	Warrington Town	4–0	Kidsgrove Athletic
15	Clitheroe	2–1	Woodley Sports
16	Worcester City	1–0	Kendal Town
17	Sutton Coldfield Town	1–1	Halesowen Town
18	Hednesford Town	1–1	Moor Green
19	Hyde United	1–5	Stalybridge Celtic
20	Weston-super-Mare	4–0	Bedford Town
21	Dartford	0–0	AFC Wimbledon
22	Lewes	2–2	Dorchester Town
23	Basingstoke Town	0–2	Welling United
24	Eastbourne Borough	0–3	Thurrock
25	Harlow Town	2–1	Folkestone Invicta
26	Ashford Town (Middx)	2–3	Bognor Regis Town
27	Maidenhead United	2–2	Bishop's Stortford
28	Braintree Town	0–1	Hayes
29	Tonbridge Angels	0–0	East Thurrock United
30	Farnborough Town	2–0	Banbury United
31	Barking & East Ham United	2–1	Croydon Athletic
32	Sittingbourne	1–3	Cambridge City
33	Weymouth	2–1	Havant & Waterlooville
34	Uxbridge	2–2	Sutton United
35	Bath City	1–2	Yeading
36	Leighton Town	1–1	Eastleigh
37	Boreham Wood	3–1	Stamford
38	Salisbury City	3–0	Newport County
39	Redbridge	1–1	Harrow Borough
40	Chippenham Town	0–2	Carshalton Athletic
41	Cray Wanderers	1–1	Kingstonian
42	Heybridge Swifts	0–1	St Albans City

=== Replays ===
Tie	Home team	Score	Away team
4	A F C Telford United	1–2	Worksop Town
6	Northwich Victoria	2–1	Hucknall Town
7	Barrow	2–0	Redditch United
8	Workington	1–2	Lancaster City
10	Histon	2–1	Hinckley United
17	Halesowen Town	3–0	Sutton Coldfield Town
18	Moor Green	2–4	Hednesford Town
21	AFC Wimbledon	2–0	Dartford
22	Dorchester Town	3–1	Lewes
27	Bishop's Stortford	2–1	Maidenhead United
29	East Thurrock United	3–0	Tonbridge Angels
34	Sutton United	0–1	Uxbridge
36	Eastleigh	1–2	Leighton Town
39	Harrow Borough	2–3	Redbridge
41	Kingstonian	3–1	Cray Wanderers

== 1st round ==
The teams from Conference National entered in this round.

=== Ties ===
Tie	Home team	Score	Away team
1	Halesowen Town	1–2	Tamworth
2	York City	1–2	Northwich Victoria
3	Solihull Borough	2–1	Hednesford Town
4	Vauxhall Motors	0–4	Morecambe
5	Halifax Town	0–0	Southport
6	Warrington Town	1–2	Blyth Spartans
7	Burton Albion	0–1	Worksop Town
8	Alfreton Town	1–1	Histon
9	Barrow	2–1	Clitheroe
10	Accrington Stanley	2–0	Altrincham
11	Kidderminster Harriers	4–0	Scarborough
12	Stafford Rangers	4–2	Lancaster City
13	Stalybridge Celtic	1–0	Droylsden
14	Kettering Town	2–1	Farsley Celtic
15	Yeading	1–2	Carshalton Athletic
16	Salisbury City	1–0	Harlow Town
17	Aldershot Town	1–1	Grays Athletic
18	Weston-super-Mare	3–2	Barking & East Ham United
19	AFC Wimbledon	2–3	St Albans City
20	Stevenage Borough	0–2	Crawley Town
21	Exeter City	2–1	Bishop's Stortford
22	Bognor Regis Town	1–7	Hereford United
23	Dagenham & Redbridge	2–0	Thurrock
24	Uxbridge	1–2	Woking
25	Canvey Island	4–1	Kingstonian
26	Boreham Wood	1–0	Leighton Town
27	Worcester City	1–0	Hayes
28	Dorchester Town	3–2	Cambridge United
29	Weymouth	0–1	Forest Green Rovers
30	Farnborough Town	0–2	Cambridge City
31	East Thurrock United	0–2	Gravesend & Northfleet
32	Welling United	4–1	Redbridge

=== Replays ===
Tie	Home team	Score	Away team
5	Southport	0–1	Halifax Town
8	Histon	2–1	Alfreton Town
17	Grays Athletic	1–0	Aldershot Town

== 2nd round ==
=== Ties ===
Tie	Home team	Score	Away team
1	Canvey Island	0–1	Salisbury City
2	Stalybridge Celtic	1–0	Solihull Borough
3	Halifax Town	0–1	Hereford United
4	Carshalton Athletic	2–2	Accrington Stanley
5	Boreham Wood	3–1	Gravesend & Northfleet
6	Tamworth	1–0	St Albans City
7	Forest Green Rovers	3–1	Dorchester Town
8	Weston-super-Mare	1–1	Worksop Town
9	Woking	1–1	Northwich Victoria
10	Barrow	1–2	Cambridge City
11	Exeter City	3–2	Histon
12	Dagenham & Redbridge	2–1	Kettering Town
13	Blyth Spartans	1–3	Welling United
14	Stafford Rangers	1–0	Morecambe
15	Crawley Town	3–1	Worcester City
16	Kidderminster Harriers	0–1	Grays Athletic

=== Replays ===
Tie	Home team	Score	Away team
4	Accrington Stanley	2–0	Carshalton Athletic
8	Worksop Town	2–1	Weston-super-Mare
9	Northwich Victoria	1–2	Woking

== 3rd round ==
=== Ties ===
Tie	Home team	Score	Away team
1	Hereford United	0–1	Grays Athletic
2	Stafford Rangers	2–1	Forest Green Rovers
3	Crawley Town	0–2	Boreham Wood
4	Woking	3–2	Welling United
5	Tamworth	0–0	Dagenham & Redbridge
6	Exeter City	1–0	Cambridge City
7	Accrington Stanley	1–1	Worksop Town
8	Salisbury City	0–0	Stalybridge Celtic

=== Replays ===
Tie	Home team	Score	Away team
5	Dagenham & Redbridge	3–0	Tamworth
7	Worksop Town	1–1	Accrington Stanley
	(Worksop won 4–2 on penalties)		
8	Stalybridge Celtic	0–1	Salisbury City

== Quarter finals ==
=== Ties ===
Tie	Home team	Score	Away team
1	Exeter City	3–1	Salisbury City
2	Worksop Town	0–1	Boreham Wood
3	Woking	1–1	Stafford Rangers
4	Grays Athletic	1–1	Dagenham & Redbridge

=== Replays ===
Tie	Home team	Score	Away team
3	Stafford Rangers	2–4	Woking
4	Dagenham & Redbridge	2–4	Grays Athletic

== Semi finals ==
=== First leg ===
Tie	Home team	Score	Away team
1	Boreham Wood	0–1	Woking
2	Exeter City	2–1	Grays Athletic

=== Second leg ===
Tie	Home team	Score	Away team	Aggregate
1	Grays Athletic	2–0	Exeter City	3–2
2	Woking	2–0	Boreham Wood	3–0

== Final ==
14 May 2006
15:00 BST

Grays Athletic	2–0	Woking
Oli 41'; Poole 45'	(Report)

Boleyn Ground, Upton Park, London
Attendance: 13,997
Referee: Howard Webb (Sheffield & Hallamshire)

GRAYS ATHLETIC:
GK	1	(England) Ashley Bayes
RB	2	(England) Andy Sambrook
CB	4	(England) Jamie Stuart
CB	26	(England) Christian Hanson
LB	3	(England) John Nutter
RM	14	(England) Michael Kightly	(substituted off) 90'
CM	6	(England) Stuart Thurgood (c)
CM	10	(England) John Martin
LM	23	(England) Glenn Poole
CF	7	(England) Dennis Oli
CF	11	(England) Aaron McLean
Substitutes:
GK	16	(England) Nicky Eyre
DF	20	(England) Cameron Mawer
MF	19	(England) Ade Olayinka
MF	12	(England) Tom Williamson	(substituted on) 90'
FW	8	(England) Gary Hooper
Manager:
(England) Mark Stimson

WOKING:
GK	?	(Iraq) Shwan Jalal
DF	?	(England) Tom Hutchinson
DF	?	(England) Simon Jackson
DF	?	(England) Stuart Nethercott		(substituted off) 60'
DF	?	(England) Gary MacDonald
MF	?	(England) Karl Murray
MF	?	(England) Neil Smith		(substituted off) 60'
MF	?	(Wales) Stephen Evans		(substituted off) 83'
MF	?	(Scotland) Steven Ferguson
CF	?	(England) Justin Richards
CF	?	(Scotland) Craig McAllister
Substitutes:
GK	?	(Australia) Clint Davies
DF	?	(England) Karim El-Salahi
DF	?	(England) Paul Watson	(yellow card) ?'	(substituted on) 60'
MF	?	(England) Liam Cockerill		(substituted on) 60'
FW	?	(England) Lloyd Blackman		(substituted on) 83'
Manager:
(England) Glenn Cockerill

Man of the Match:
(England) Michael Kightly

Assistant referees:
(England) Gavin Ward (Kent)
(England) Trevor Massey (Manchester)
Fourth official:
(England) Keith Stroud (Hampshire)
