= 2004–05 Port Vale F.C. season =

Port Vale F.C.
2004–05 season
- Owner: Valiant 2001
- Chairman: Bill Bratt
- Manager: Martin Foyle
- Stadium: Vale Park
- Football League One: 18th (56 points)
- FA Cup: Second Round (eliminated by Blackpool)
- League Cup: First Round (eliminated by Doncaster Rovers)
- Football League Trophy: Second Round (eliminated by Tranmere Rovers)
- Player of the Year: Billy Paynter
- Top goalscorer: League: Lee Matthews, Billy Paynter (10 each); All: Billy Paynter (13)
- Highest home attendance: 8,671 vs. Sheffield Wednesday, 28 December 2004
- Lowest home attendance: 1,970 vs. Barnsley, 28 September 2004
- Average home league attendance: 4,973
- Biggest win: 5–0 vs. Barnsley, 23 April 2005
- Biggest defeat: 0–4 (twice)
Home colours

The 2004–05 season was Port Vale's 93rd season of football in the English Football League, and first in the newly created League One. It was Martin Foyle's first full season in charge after succeeding Brian Horton midway through the previous campaign. The club endured a relegation scrap but ultimately secured 18th place with 56 points, ensuring safety despite the loss of key performers Stephen McPhee and Steve Brooker over the summer.

Port Vale struggled to make an impact in cup competitions. They were eliminated in the First Round of the League Cup, suffered defeat to Blackpool in the Second Round of the FA Cup, and exited the Football League Trophy at the Second Round after a loss to Tranmere Rovers. On the field, Billy Paynter emerged as the club's top scorer with 13 goals in all competitions, while Lee Matthews also contributed ten league goals. One of the season's standout results was a 5–0 home win over Barnsley in April, although the campaign also featured heavy 4–0 losses on two occasions. Attendance remained low, with an average crowd of around 4,973, underscoring the ongoing financial challenges facing the club.

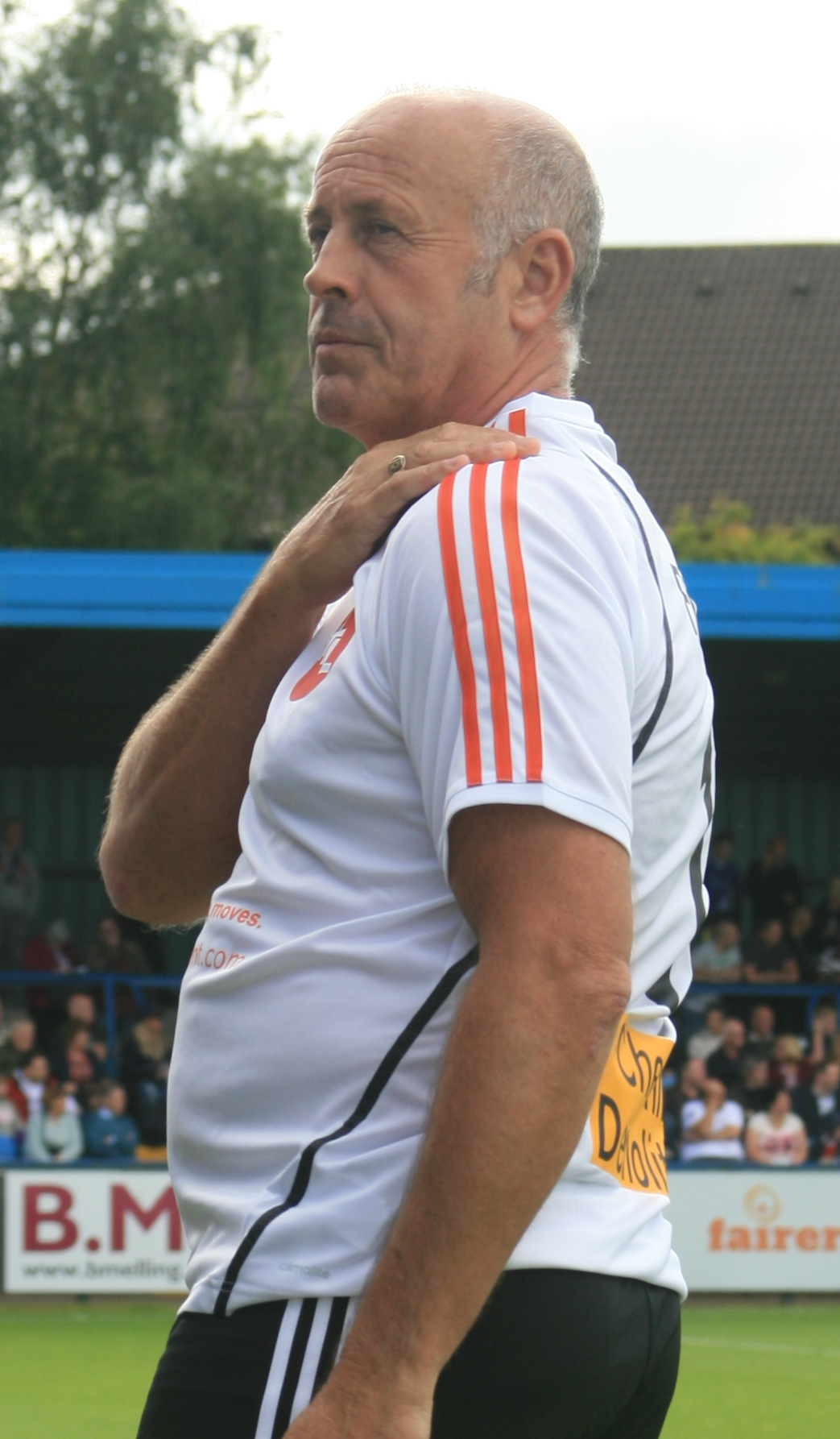
Manager Martin Foyle.

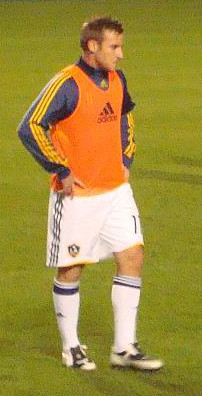
Winger Chris Birchall managed to establish himself as a first-team regular.

== Overview ==
=== League One ===
The pre-season saw Martin Foyle add to his squad with a number of free signings: Lee Matthews (Bristol City); Jeff Smith (Bolton Wanderers); Dean Smith (Sheffield Wednesday); Daryl McMahon (West Ham United); and Robin Hulbert (Telford United). The pre-season saw Vale finish 5th in the Isle of Man tournament at The Bowl. They also managed to battle to a draw at home to La Liga club Racing de Santander.

The season started positively with ten points from five games, though until the end of the season, Vale failed to find form and picked up an average of one point a game despite only playing in five draws all season. On 14 August, Vale beat Hull City 3–2, with Brooker scoring two goals including a stoppage-time winner. At half-time at the opening game of the season at Vale Park, fans were surprised to hear an announcement over the public address system telling them not to sing songs deriding rivals Stoke City. Vale defeated Bristol City by three goals to nil on 28 August, quickly building on their lead after Craig James opened the scoring on 37 minutes. Mark Goodlad picked up an injury, allowing Jonny Brain the chance to impress between the sticks. Teenage defender James O'Connor joined on loan from Aston Villa. O'Connor made his debut on 4 September as Vale picked up their first away of the season with a 2–0 victory at Bradford City. At the end of September, star midfielder Steve Brooker was sold to Bristol City for £225,000. The club failed to bring in Christian Roberts in return, though Marc Goodfellow was signed on a four-week loan deal the following month. In November, Andreas Lipa returned to his homeland to play for Austria Lustenau, after Foyle released the injury-plagued defender. McMahon also left the club to join Leyton Orient. Foyle brought a new signing to Vale Park though, with striker Nathan Lowndes joining on a free transfer from Plymouth Argyle. In December, defender Tyrone Loran joined on a one-month loan from Tranmere Rovers, though returned to Prenton Park when the loan deal was up, after Foyle failed to sign him permanently. Christian Hanson was also signed from non-League Billingham Synthonia. Foyle also signed Nigerian defender George Abbey, who had been released by Macclesfield Town.

On 3 January, Matthews scored both of the goals as Vale won 2–0 away at Blackpool, ending a run of six defeats in seven games. Dean Smith retired as a player and took up coaching at Leyton Orient. As a replacement, former Vale player Tommy Widdrington joined until the end of the season on non-contract terms. In February, veteran midfielder Danny Sonner joined on a one-month loan from Peterborough United. On 19 March, Vale beat Walsall 2–0 at home despite injuries severely limited the availability of fit players, with full-back Steve Rowland stepping up to play an excellent game in a centre-back partnership with Sam Collins. In March, club legend and former teammate of Foyle, Tony Naylor, joined on an emergency short-term contract, though never took to the field. Tony Dinning also was signed on loan from Bristol City. In addition to this, Mark Innes joined on a free transfer from Chesterfield. Sonner's loan deal was also extended until the end of the season, at which point he was signed permanently, as was Dinning. Vale lost to fellow relegation strugglers Torquay United and Wrexham in the last five games of the season, though a 5–0 win over Barnsley ensured the club's safety from the drop.

They finished in 18th place with 56 points, leaving them five points clear of relegated Torquay. Their 59 goals conceded was a highly respectable tally, however, they failed to score in almost half of their league games, and only recorded five draws all season. Vale lost more games and scored fewer goals than all clubs in the division other than Peterborough United and Stockport County, who were both cut adrift early in the season. Billy Paynter was the club's top-scorer with 13 goals, with other contributions also coming from Lee Matthews and Chris Birchall.

At the end of the season teenage prodigy David Hibbert was snapped up by Preston North End, who paid Vale £35,000 after a tribunal. Four players were also released: Simon Eldershaw (Northwich Victoria); Christian Hanson (Billingham Synthonia); Levi Reid (Stafford Rangers); and Ryan Brown (Leek Town). Ian Armstrong also retired due to injury.

=== Finances ===
On the financial front, Chairman Bill Bratt announced there was a 50-50 chance that an elderly American would put funds into the club. However, the investment did not come through. Bratt also went public with his idea of Reginald Mitchell Stadium in honour of the inventor of the Spitfire, hopeful that 85-year-old American billionaire Sidney Frank would thus be encouraged to invest in the club. Foyle was desperate for more funds to attract better players, and was forced to dismiss speculation that he would sell Billy Paynter to Crewe Alexandra. On 13 December, shareholders voted by a margin of 119 to 3 to limit individual holdings in the club to a maximum of 24.9% "to ensure that no single shareholder can acquire undue influence or control over the company", in the words of Bill Bratt. The club's shirt sponsorship came from mobile phone company Tricell. However, the firm could not afford to pay the club any money as they entered administration, worsening an already bleak financial picture for the "Valiants".

=== Cup competitions ===
In the FA Cup, Vale avoided embarrassment by coming from behind to defeat local side Kidderminster Harriers 3–1. They then lost out to Blackpool in the second round with a 1–0 defeat at Bloomfield Road.

In the League Cup, Vale travelled to Belle Vue, where they were knocked out by Doncaster Rovers after a 3–1 defeat.

In the Football League Trophy, the "Valiants" advanced past Barnsley in front of a Vale Park crowd of just 1,970. However, they then exited at the second round after a 2–1 defeat to Tranmere Rovers at Prenton Park.

== Results ==
=== Pre-season ===
18 July 2004 Isle of Man International Football Festival	Wrexham	1–0	Port Vale	Douglas, Isle of Man
14:00 BST	Williams 85'	Report		Stadium: National Sports Centre; Attendance: 605; Referee: Nick Preskey; Assistant referees: J. Freland, P. Beighton; Fourth official: M. Thomas

July 2004 Isle of Man International Football Festival	Bristol Rovers	2–2 (6–5 p)	Port Vale	Douglas, Isle of Man
				Stadium: National Sports Centre

July 2004 Isle of Man International Football Festival	IOM Select XI	1–5	Port Vale	Douglas, Isle of Man
				Stadium: National Sports Centre

=== Football League One ===
==== League table ====
Pos	Team	Pld	W	D	L	GF	GA	GD	Pts
16	Blackpool	46	15	12	19	54	59	−5	57
17	Chesterfield	46	14	15	17	55	62	−7	57
18	Port Vale	46	17	5	24	49	59	−10	56
19	Oldham Athletic	46	14	10	22	60	73	−13	52
20	Milton Keynes Dons	46	12	15	19	54	68	−14	51

Updated to match(es) played on May 2005. Source: Soccerbase
Rules for classification: 1) points; 2) goal difference; 3) number of goals scored.

==== Results by matchday ====
Round	1	2	3	4	5	6	7	8	9	10	11	12	13	14	15	16	17	18	19	20	21	22	23	24	25	26	27	28	29	30	31	32	33	34	35	36	37	38	39	40	41	42	43	44	45	46
Ground	A	H	H	A	H	A	A	H	A	H	A	H	A	H	H	A	A	H	A	H	A	H	A	H	H	A	A	H	A	H	A	H	A	H	A	H	A	H	A	H	A	H	A	H	A	H
Result	L	W	W	D	W	L	W	L	L	L	L	W	L	W	D	L	W	L	L	W	L	W	L	L	L	W	L	L	L	W	W	L	L	W	L	D	D	W	D	L	W	L	W	L	L	W
Position	15	11	4	9	4	6	3	6	13	16	17	13	15	13	14	16	13	15	17	16	18	16	16	17	18	17	17	17	17	18	16	17	18	16	17	17	18	16	17	18	17	18	18	18	18	18
Points	0	3	6	7	10	10	13	13	13	13	13	16	16	19	20	20	23	23	23	26	26	29	29	29	29	32	32	32	32	35	38	38	38	41	41	42	43	46	47	47	50	50	53	53	53	56

Source: Statto
A = Away; H = Home; W = Win; D = Draw; L = Loss

==== Matches ====
7 August 2004 1	Walsall	3–2	Port Vale	Walsall
	Fryatt 12' (pen.); Williams 82'; Taylor 86'	Report	Paynter 61'; Matthews 90'	Stadium: Bescot Stadium; Attendance: 8,225; Referee: Lee Probert

10 August 2004 2	Port Vale	3–2	Milton Keynes Dons	Burslem
	Brooker 43'; Armstrong 46', 64'	Report	Harding 19', 75'	Stadium: Vale Park; Attendance: 4,602; Referee: Mick Fletcher

14 August 2004 3	Port Vale	3–2	Hull City	Burslem
15:00 BST	Collins 26'; Brooker 51', 90'	Report	Barmby 14'; Elliott 90'	Stadium: Vale Park; Attendance: 6,736; Referee: Mike Thorpe

21 August 2004 4	Wrexham	1–1	Port Vale	Wrexham
	Holt 72'	Report	Brooker 64'	Stadium: Racecourse Ground; Attendance: 5,005; Referee: Trevor Parkes

28 August 2004 5	Port Vale	3–0	Bristol City	Burslem
	James 37'; Brooker 45'; Armstrong 66'	Report		Stadium: Vale Park; Attendance: 5,377; Referee: Paul Armstrong

31 August 2004 6	Chesterfield	1–0	Port Vale	Chesterfield, Derbyshire
19:30 BST	N'Toya 53'	Report		Stadium: Saltergate; Attendance: 5,150; Referee: Paul Robinson

4 September 2004 7	Bradford City	0–2	Port Vale	Bradford
		Report	Paynter 40'; J. Smith 49'	Stadium: Valley Parade; Attendance: 7,043; Referee: Tony Leake

11 September 2004 8	Port Vale	0–3	Huddersfield Town	Burslem
		Report	Abbott 62', 67', 75'	Stadium: Vale Park; Attendance: 6,298; Referee: Keith Hill

18 September 2004 9	Brentford	1–0	Port Vale	Brentford, West London
	Salako 25' (pen.)	Report		Stadium: Griffin Park; Attendance: 5,442; Referee: Clive Penton

25 September 2004 10	Port Vale	0–3	Blackpool	Burslem
		Report	Taylor 6'; Vernon 27', 47'	Stadium: Vale Park; Attendance: 5,347; Referee: Eddie Ilderton

2 October 2004 11	Colchester United	2–1	Port Vale	Colchester
	Danns 10', 19'	Report	Matthews 84'	Stadium: Layer Road; Attendance: 3,230; Referee: Martin Atkinson

8 October 2004 12	Port Vale	2–0	Doncaster Rovers	Burslem
	Paynter 15'; Collins 29'	Report		Stadium: Vale Park; Attendance: 5,314; Referee: Mark Warren

16 October 2004 13	AFC Bournemouth	4–0	Port Vale	Bournemouth
	Spicer 9'; Stock 39', 45'; Cummings 46'	Report		Stadium: Dean Court; Attendance: 6,119; Referee: Andre Marriner

19 October 2004 14	Port Vale	1–0	Swindon Town	Burslem
	Birchall 76'	Report		Stadium: Vale Park; Attendance: 3,872; Referee: Nigel Miller

23 October 2004 15	Port Vale	0–0	Stockport County	Burslem
		Report		Stadium: Vale Park; Attendance: 5,025; Referee: Brian Curson

30 October 2004 16	Hartlepool United	1–0	Port Vale	Hartlepool
	Williams 24'	Report		Stadium: Victoria Park; Attendance: 4,755; Referee: Scott Mathieson

6 November 2004 17	Barnsley	1–2	Port Vale	Barnsley
	Conlon 44' (pen.)	Report	Paynter 65'; Williams 69' (og.)	Stadium: Oakwell; Attendance: 8,642; Referee: Keith Stroud

20 November 2004 18	Port Vale	1–2	Torquay United	Burslem
	Cummins 50'	Report	Hill 42'; Constantine 65'	Stadium: Vale Park; Attendance: 4,763; Referee: Russell Booth

27 November 2004 19	Peterborough United	4–0	Port Vale	Peterborough
15:00 GMT	Purser 38'; Farrell 62'; Boucaud 69'; Woodhouse 83' (pen.)	Report		Stadium: London Road Stadium; Attendance: 3,785; Referee: Fred Graham; Assistant referees: M. Murphy, D. Naylor; Fourth official: C. Francis

7 December 2004 20	Port Vale	3–1	Tranmere Rovers	Burslem
	Birchall 9', 51'; Paynter 17'	Report	Jackson 73'	Stadium: Vale Park; Attendance: 4,027; Referee: Eddie Ilderton

11 December 2004 21	Luton Town	1–0	Port Vale	Luton
	Brković 84'	Report		Stadium: Kenilworth Road; Attendance: 6,974; Referee: Mick Fletcher

18 December 2004 22	Port Vale	3–1	Oldham Athletic	Burslem
	Paynter 36'; Birchall 63'; Matthews 79' (pen.)	Report	Vernon 34'	Stadium: Vale Park; Attendance: 4,849; Referee: Mike Jones

26 December 2004 23	Huddersfield Town	2–1	Port Vale	Huddersfield
	Schofield 4'; Abbott 8'	Report	Eldershaw 38'	Stadium: Kirklees Stadium; Attendance: 12,243; Referee: Kevin Wright

28 December 2004 24	Port Vale	0–2	Sheffield Wednesday	Burslem
15:00 GMT		Report	Jones 27'; McGovern 43'	Stadium: Vale Park; Attendance: 8,671; Referee: Steve Tanner

1 January 2005 25	Port Vale	0–1	Bradford City	Burslem
		Report	Forrest 61'	Stadium: Vale Park; Attendance: 5,001; Referee: Ray Olivier

3 January 2005 26	Blackpool	0–2	Port Vale	Blackpool
15:00 GMT		Report	Matthews 72', 78' (pen.)	Stadium: Bloomfield Road; Attendance: 5,115; Referee: Alan Kaye

8 January 2005 27	Doncaster Rovers	2–0	Port Vale	Doncaster
	Ryan 45'; Green 90'	Report		Stadium: Belle Vue; Attendance: 5,209; Referee: Joe Ross

15 January 2005 28	Port Vale	0–1	Brentford	Burslem
		Report	Hutchinson 29'	Stadium: Vale Park; Attendance: 4,230; Referee: Clive Oliver

21 January 2005 29	Sheffield Wednesday	1–0	Port Vale	Owlerton
	MacLean 15'	Report		Stadium: Hillsborough Stadium; Attendance: 18,465; Referee: Jarnail Singh
Note: Fixture was initially scheduled for 22 January but was brought forward for live Sky Sports broadcasting.

5 February 2005 30	Port Vale	2–1	AFC Bournemouth	Burslem
	Paynter 17'; Birchall 34'	Report	O'Connor 13'	Stadium: Vale Park; Attendance: 4,186; Referee: Darren Drysdale

12 February 2005 31	Stockport County	1–2	Port Vale	Stockport
	Le Fondre 88'	Report	Lowndes 22'; Paynter 52'	Stadium: Edgeley Park; Attendance: 4,587; Referee: Nigel Miller

19 February 2005 32	Port Vale	0–1	Hartlepool United	Burslem
		Report	Porter 2'	Stadium: Vale Park; Attendance: 4,366; Referee: Tony Leake

23 February 2005 33	Swindon Town	1–0	Port Vale	Swindon
	Proctor 25'	Report		Stadium: County Ground; Attendance: 4,724; Referee: Kevin Friend

26 February 2005 34	Port Vale	3–1	Luton Town	Burslem
	Hibbert 42', 59'; Matthews 81'	Report	Foley 6'	Stadium: Vale Park; Attendance: 5,353; Referee: Andy Penn

5 March 2005 35	Oldham Athletic	3–0	Port Vale	Oldham
	Haining 27'; Cooper 52', 54'	Report		Stadium: Boundary Park; Attendance: 5,799; Referee: Mark Warren

8 March 2005 36	Port Vale	0–0	Colchester United	Burslem
		Report		Stadium: Vale Park; Attendance: 3,496; Referee: Paul Robinson

12 March 2005 37	Milton Keynes Dons	1–1	Port Vale	Milton Keynes
	Platt 72'	Report	Matthews 69'	Stadium: Stadium MK; Attendance: 4,676; Referee: Keith Stroud

19 March 2005 38	Port Vale	2–0	Walsall	Burslem
	Cummins 51'; Matthews 57'	Report		Stadium: Vale Park; Attendance: 5,085; Referee: Mike Pike

26 March 2005 39	Hull City	2–2	Port Vale	Kingston upon Hull
13:00 GMT	Cort 33'; Fagan 90' (pen.)	Report	Matthews 13'; Delaney 67' (og.)	Stadium: KC Stadium; Attendance: 17,678; Referee: Phil Prosser

2 April 2005 40	Bristol City	2–0	Port Vale	Ashton Gate, Bristol
	Lita 14'; Heffernan 68'	Report		Stadium: Ashton Gate; Attendance: 10,284; Referee: Russell Booth

9 April 2005 41	Port Vale	1–0	Chesterfield	Burslem
	Matthews 49'	Report		Stadium: Vale Park; Attendance: 4,489; Referee: Martin Atkinson

16 April 2005 42	Torquay United	1–0	Port Vale	Torquay
	Constantine 90' (pen.)	Report		Stadium: Plainmoor; Attendance: 3,592; Referee: Fred Graham

23 April 2005 43	Port Vale	5–0	Barnsley	Burslem
	Birchall 16'; Paynter 41', 50'; Dinning 57', 70'	Report		Stadium: Vale Park; Attendance: 4,324; Referee: Mick Fletcher

26 April 2005 44	Port Vale	0–2	Wrexham	Burslem
		Report	Holt 21'; Llewellyn 42'	Stadium: Vale Park; Attendance: 4,151; Referee: Andy Hall

29 April 2005 45	Tranmere Rovers	1–0	Port Vale	Prenton
	Hall 40'	Report		Stadium: Prenton Park; Attendance: 8,940; Referee: Phil Prosser

7 May 2005 46	Port Vale	1–0	Peterborough United	Burslem
	Dinning 63'	Report		Stadium: Vale Park; Attendance: 4,815; Referee: Mark Cowburn

=== FA Cup ===
12 November 2004 R1	Port Vale	3–1	Kidderminster Harriers	Burslem
	Paynter 53', 65'; Reid 59'	Report	Hatswell 4'	Stadium: Vale Park; Attendance: 4,141; Referee: Graham Salisbury

4 December 2004 R2	Blackpool	1–0	Port Vale	Blackpool
	Taylor 26'	Report		Stadium: Bloomfield Road; Attendance: 4,669; Referee: Nigel Miller

=== League Cup ===
24 August 2004 R1	Doncaster Rovers	3–1	Port Vale	Doncaster
		Report	D.Smith	Stadium: Belle Vue; Attendance: 3,943

=== Football League Trophy ===
28 September 2004 R1	Port Vale	1–0	Barnsley	Burslem
	Paynter 45' (pen.)	Report		Stadium: Vale Park; Attendance: 1,970; Referee: Trevor Parkes

2 November 2004 R2	Tranmere Rovers	2–1	Port Vale	Prenton
	Zola 6'; Hume 40'	Report	Birchall 68'	Stadium: Prenton Park; Attendance: 3,735; Referee: Mark Cowburn

== Squad statistics ==
=== Appearances and goals ===
Key to positions: GK – Goalkeeper; DF – Defender; MF – Midfielder; FW – Forward

No.	Pos	Nat	Player	Total		League One		FA Cup		League Cup		Football League Trophy	
No.	Pos	Nat	Player	Apps	Goals	Apps	Goals	Apps	Goals	Apps	Goals	Apps	Goals
1	GK	(England) ENG	Mark Goodlad	20	0	20	0	0	0	0	0	0	0
2	DF	(England) ENG	George Pilkington	48	0	43	0	2	0	1	0	2	0
3	DF	(England) ENG	Craig James	33	1	30	1	0	0	1	0	2	0
4	MF	(England) ENG	Danny Sonner	13	0	13	0	0	0	0	0	0	0
5	DF	(England) ENG	Michael Walsh	25	0	23	0	2	0	0	0	0	0
6	DF	(England) ENG	Sam Collins	37	2	33	2	1	0	1	0	2	0
7	FW	(England) ENG	Lee Matthews	32	10	31	10	0	0	1	0	0	0
8	MF	(Republic of Ireland) IRL	Micky Cummins	43	2	39	2	2	0	0	0	2	0
9	FW	(England) ENG	Nathan Lowndes	14	1	12	1	2	0	0	0	0	0
10	FW	(England) ENG	Billy Paynter	50	13	45	10	2	2	1	0	2	1
11	MF	(England) ENG	Jeff Smith	39	1	34	1	2	0	1	0	2	0
12	MF	(England) ENG	Tony Dinning	7	3	7	3	0	0	0	0	0	0
13	MF	(England) ENG	Levi Reid	34	1	30	0	2	1	1	0	1	0
14	DF	(England) ENG	Ryan Brown	25	0	20	0	2	0	1	0	2	0
15	MF	(England) ENG	Ian Armstrong	11	3	8	3	1	0	1	0	1	0
16	DF	(Wales) WAL	Steve Rowland	26	0	24	0	2	0	0	0	0	0
17	MF	(Trinidad and Tobago) TTO	Chris Birchall	39	7	34	6	2	0	1	0	2	1
19	FW	(England) ENG	Simon Eldershaw	13	1	13	1	0	0	0	0	0	0
20	MF	(England) ENG	Robin Hulbert	27	0	24	0	2	0	0	0	1	0
21	FW	(England) ENG	David Hibbert	10	2	9	2	0	0	0	0	1	0
22	DF	(Nigeria) NGR	George Abbey	18	0	18	0	0	0	0	0	0	0
23	GK	(England) ENG	Joe Anyon	0	0	0	0	0	0	0	0	0	0
24	GK	(England) ENG	Jonny Brain	32	0	27	0	2	0	1	0	2	0
25	DF	(England) ENG	Christian Hanson	5	0	5	0	0	0	0	0	0	0
26	MF	(England) ENG	Daniel Holmes	0	0	0	0	0	0	0	0	0	0
27	DF	(Scotland) SCO	Mark Innes	5	0	5	0	0	0	0	0	0	0
30	MF	(England) ENG	Andy Porter	2	0	2	0	0	0	0	0	0	0
Players who featured but departed the club during the season:
4	DF	(Austria) AUT	Andreas Lipa	2	0	2	0	0	0	0	0	0	0
4	DF	(Netherlands Antilles) ANT	Tyrone Loran	7	0	6	0	1	0	0	0	0	0
9	FW	(England) ENG	Steve Brooker	11	5	9	5	0	0	1	0	1	0
12	DF	(England) ENG	Dean Smith	15	1	13	0	0	0	1	1	1	0
18	DF	(England) ENG	Simon Robinson	0	0	0	0	0	0	0	0	0	0
22	DF	(England) ENG	James O'Connor	15	0	13	0	0	0	0	0	2	0
25	MF	(Republic of Ireland) IRL	Daryl McMahon	6	0	5	0	0	0	0	0	1	0
26	MF	(England) ENG	Marc Goodfellow	4	0	4	0	0	0	0	0	0	0
29	MF	(England) ENG	Tommy Widdrington	6	0	6	0	0	0	0	0	0	0
	FW	(England) ENG	Tony Naylor	0	0	0	0	0	0	0	0	0	0

=== Top scorers ===
Place	Position	Nation	Number	Name	League One	FA Cup	League Cup	Football League Trophy	Total
1	FW	England	10	Billy Paynter	10	2	0	1	13
2	FW	England	7	Lee Matthews	10	0	0	0	10
3	MF	Trinidad	17	Chris Birchall	6	0	0	1	7
4	FW	England	9	Steve Brooker	5	0	0	0	5
5	MF	England	15	Ian Armstrong	3	0	0	0	3
–	MF	England	12	Tony Dinning	3	0	0	0	3
7	MF	Ireland	8	Micky Cummins	2	0	0	0	2
–	DF	England	6	Sam Collins	2	0	0	0	2
–	FW	England	21	David Hibbert	2	0	0	0	2
10	DF	England	3	Craig James	1	0	0	0	1
–	MF	England	11	Jeff Smith	1	0	0	0	1
–	FW	England	19	Simon Eldershaw	1	0	0	0	1
–	FW	England	9	Nathan Lowndes	1	0	0	0	1
–	DF	England	12	Dean Smith	0	0	1	0	1
–	MF	England	13	Levi Reid	0	1	0	0	1
–		–	–	Own goals	2	0	0	0	2
				TOTALS	49	3	1	2	55

== Transfers ==
=== Transfers in ===
Date from	Position	Nationality	Name	From	Fee	Ref.
June 2004	FW	ENG	Lee Matthews	Bristol City	Free transfer	
June 2004	MF	ENG	Jeff Smith	Bolton Wanderers	Free transfer	
July 2004	MF	ENG	Robin Hulbert	Telford United	Free transfer	
July 2004	DF	ENG	Dean Smith	Sheffield Wednesday	Free transfer	
September 2004	MF	IRL	Daryl McMahon	West Ham United	Non-contract terms	
November 2004	FW	ENG	Nathan Lowndes	Plymouth Argyle	Free transfer	
December 2004	DF	ENG	Christian Hanson	Billingham Synthonia	Free transfer	
December 2004	MF	ENG	Andy Porter	Kidsgrove Athletic	Free transfer	
January 2005	MF	ENG	Tommy Widdrington	Hartlepool United	Non-contract terms	
March 2005	DF	SCO	Mark Innes	Chesterfield	Free transfer	

=== Transfers out ===
Date from	Position	Nationality	Name	To	Fee	Ref.
September 2004	FW	ENG	Steve Brooker	Bristol City	£225,000	
November 2004	DF	AUT	Andreas Lipa	Austria Lustenau	Free transfer	
November 2004	MF	IRL	Daryl McMahon	Leyton Orient	Free transfer	
December 2004	DF	NGR	George Abbey	Macclesfield Town	Free transfer	
January 2005	DF	ENG	Dean Smith		Released	
May 2005	DF	ENG	Ryan Brown	Leek Town	Released	
May 2005	FW	ENG	Simon Eldershaw	Northwich Victoria	Released	
May 2005	DF	ENG	Christian Hanson	Billingham Synthonia	Released	
May 2005	MF	ENG	Levi Reid	Stafford Rangers	Released	
May 2005	MF	ENG	Tommy Widdrington	Salisbury City	Released	
June 2005	FW	ENG	David Hibbert	Preston North End	£35,000	
Summer 2005	MF	ENG	Ian Armstrong	Retired		

=== Loans in ===
Date from	Position	Nationality	Name	From	Date to	Ref.
4 September 2004	DF	ENG	James O'Connor	Aston Villa	4 December 2004	
4 October 2004	MF	ENG	Marc Goodfellow	Bristol City	4 November 2004	
2 December 2004	DF	ANT	Tyrone Loran	Tranmere Rovers	4 January 2005	
21 February 2005	MF	NIR	Danny Sonner	Peterborough United	End of season	
22 March 2005	MF	ENG	Tony Dinning	Bristol City	End of season	

=== Loans out ===
Date from	Position	Nationality	Name	To	Date to	Ref.
7 April 2005	GK	ENG	Joe Anyon	Stafford Rangers	End of season	
