= Isser Woloch =

American historian

- Awards: Leo Gershoy Award (1994)

Academic background
- Education: Columbia University (B.A.); Princeton University (Ph.D.)

Academic work
- Discipline: French history
- Institutions: Columbia University

Isser Woloch (born 1937) is the Moore Collegiate Professor Emeritus of History at Columbia University. His work focuses on the French Revolution and on Napoleon Bonaparte.

== Early life ==
Woloch was educated at Columbia University (A.B., 1959) and Princeton University (Ph.D., 1965).

== Career ==
After teaching at the University of California, Los Angeles, Indiana University Bloomington, and Columbia University, Woloch became a full professor at Columbia in 1975. He was named Moore Collegiate Professor of History in 1998. Woloch was the winner of the Leo Gershoy Award of the American Historical Association in 1994.

== Selected publications ==
=== As sole author ===
- Woloch, Isser (1970). Jacobin Legacy: The Democratic Movement under the Directory. Princeton, N.J.: Princeton University Press. ISBN 978-0-691-06183-2.
- ——————— (1979). The French Veteran from the Revolution to the Restoration. Chapel Hill: University of North Carolina Press. ISBN 978-0-8078-1356-0 – via Internet Archive.
- ——————— (1982). Eighteenth-century Europe: Tradition and Progress, 1715–1789. New York: W.W. Norton & Company. ISBN 978-0-393-01506-5 – via Internet Archive.
- ——————— (1994). The New Regime: Transformations of the French Civic Order, 1789–1820s. New York: W.W. Norton & Company. ISBN 978-0-393-03591-9 – via Internet Archive.
- ——————— (2001). Napoleon and His Collaborators: The Making of a Dictatorship. New York: W.W. Norton & Company. ISBN 978-0-393-32341-2.
- ——————— (2019). The Postwar Moment: Progressive Forces in Britain, France, and the United States After World War II. New Haven: Yale University Press. ISBN 978-0-300-24268-3.

=== As editor ===
- Woloch, Isser, ed. (1996). Revolution and the Meanings of Freedom in the Nineteenth Century. Stanford, Calif.: Stanford University Press. ISBN 978-0-8047-2748-8 – via Internet Archive.
