= Rainham Mark Grammar School =

Grammar School in Rainham, United Kingdom

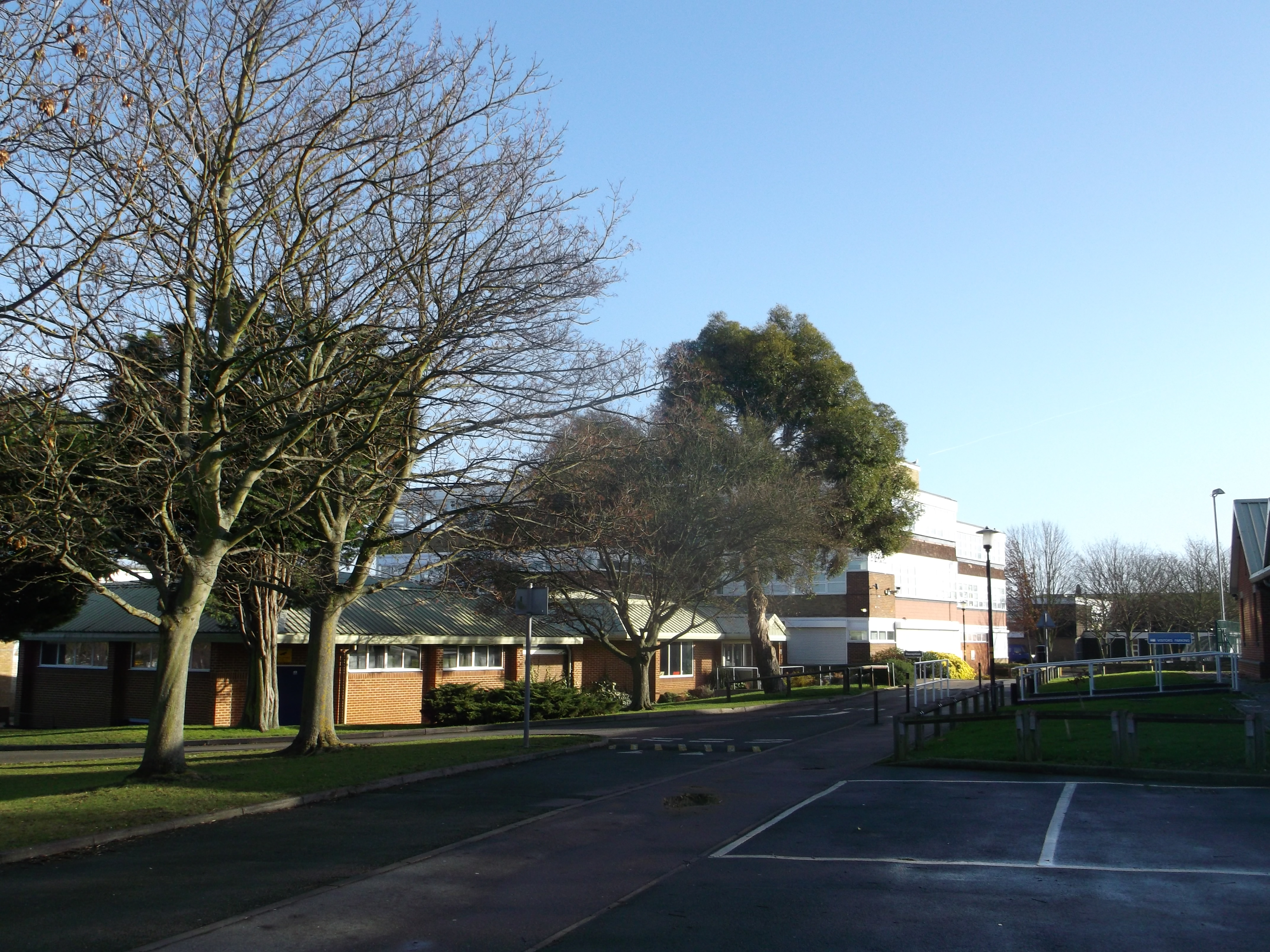

Location
- Pump Lane; Rainham, Medway, Gillingham, Medway, Kent, ME8 7AJ; United Kingdom; 51.3712°N 0.59526°E

Information
- Type: Grammar school; academy
- Department for Education URN: 136864 Tables
- Ofsted: Reports
- Head teacher: A Hart
- Gender: Mixed
- Age: 11 to 18
- Enrolment: 1235
- Houses: Aylward, Brontë, Faraday, Newton, Rutherford, Scott, Pankhurst and Lovelace
- Academy Trust: RMET
- Website: https://www.rainhammark.com

Rainham Mark Grammar School (previously Known as Gillingham Technical High School) is a co-educational selective grammar school in the Medway, Kent, England area. It has academy status, along with Twydall Primary School and Riverside Primary School.

== School information ==
RMGS is a selective secondary school. It has over 1400 pupils aged 11–16 and over 300 aged 16–18 taking A levels.

== History ==
The school was formerly known as Gillingham Technical High School, and was located in Green Street, Gillingham. It moved to its current site in Pump Lane in January 1967 when the Green Street site was deemed unfit for purpose.

Its longest-serving headteacher was Robin Keen, who was employed from 1964 until 1997. The headteacher from 1999 to 2018 was Simon Decker.

It was originally a boys-only school, until 1972 when the first co-educational year was introduced. The school was at that time already at its current Pump Lane location.

Following reorganisation of education in the authority and the school was renamed Rainham Mark Grammar School.

On 2 December 2009, A. C. Grayling visited the school, gave a speech and was interviewed by a R.E teacher.

In October 2011, a new £1.65 million sports hall was completed by the Gallagher Group.

In July 2018, RMGS headteacher Simon Decker announced he was leaving his post as head after 19 years and would be replaced by Alan Moore, but would remain as head of Rainham Mark Education Trust.

In September 2021, Alan Moore was succeeded by Lisa Barker as the headteacher of Rainham Mark Grammar School.

In January 2022, chief executive Simon Decker announced his retirement from Rainham Mark Education Trust and was succeeded by Natasha Hurturdo.

In March 2023, it was announced by chief executive officer Natasha Hurturdo that Barker would be leaving her post as headteacher of Rainham Mark Grammar School and that Emma Horstrup would be taking on the role as acting headteacher until the appointment of a new headteacher. Agnes Hart was appointed as the new Headteacher from 31 August 2023.

== Forms ==
There are eight forms in the school into which pupils in years 7–11 are sorted: Aylward, Brontë, Faraday, Newton, Pankhurst, Rutherford, Scott and Lovelace. Lovelace is the school's newest permanent form, with the first admission of pupils in 2017. Each house is given a different colour, worn as a flash above the pocket on their blazer. They are Aylward: royal blue, Brontë: purple, Faraday: green, Newton: red, Pankhurst: orange, Rutherford: yellow, Scott: light blue, and Lovelace: fuchsia.

In 2001, a seventh form was temporarily introduced for that year of entry only, called Pankhurst (after 1900s suffragette leader Emmeline Pankhurst). This was due to massive oversubscription which led to increased admissions in that year. This also occurred in 2006, 2013, 2014 and 2017.

The sixth form was previously allocated into forms A-H, with an additional form 'P' for prefects, but this was changed in 2018 with form names being aligned with the house system in the rest of the school, along with the additional year 13 form for prefects.

== 2012 school fire ==
A fire broke out in the early hours of 24 February 2012, destroying one of the science labs and damaging several other rooms with smoke. The fire was believed to be caused by faulty electrical wiring.

== Notable former pupils ==
- Craig Mackinlay (born 1966), Conservative politician
- Professor Mark Harris (born 1966), Academic
- Malcolm Gaskill (born 1967), historian
- Andrew Sambrook (born 1979), footballer
- Rehman Chishti (born 1978), Conservative politician (Although he undertook his GCSEs at Fort Luton Secondary School and A-Levels at Chatham Grammar School for Girls)
- Phil Gallagher, TV presenter
