= Alexandra Shepard =

Historian and academic

Professor Alexandra Shepard FRHistS FBA FRSE
- Occupations: Historian and academic
- Title: Professor of Gender History
- Spouse: Jason Reese (m. 2001; died 2019)
- Children: 1
- Awards: Leo Gershoy Award

Academic background
- Education: University of Cambridge
- Thesis: Meanings of manhood in early modern England: with special reference to Cambridge, c.1560-1640 (1998)
- Doctoral advisor: Keith Wrightson

Academic work
- Discipline: History
- Sub-discipline: Gender history; Social history; Cultural history; Economic history; Early modern Britain
- Institutions: St John's College, Oxford; University of Sussex; Christ's College, Cambridge; University of Glasgow
- Notable works: Accounting for Oneself: Worth, Status, and the Social Order in Early Modern England

Alexandra Jane Shepard FRHistS FBA FRSE is Professor of Gender History at the University of Glasgow. In 2018 Shepard was elected a Fellow of the British Academy in recognition for her work in gender history and the social history of early modern Britain. In 2019 she was elected a Fellow of the Royal Society of Edinburgh.

== Career ==
Shepard is Professor of Gender History within the School of Humanities at the University of Glasgow, where her research interests focus on early modern British history, with an emphasis on the social, cultural and economic history and gender relations. Her work has particular emphasis on masculinity in England in the 16th and 17th centuries, and more recently has undertaken comparative research on women's work and agency in early modern history. Her work has contributed to changing the understanding of working-class life over the past five centuries.

She is Co-Investigator of the Arts and Humanities Research Council funded project ‘Women Negotiating the Boundaries of Justice: Britain and Ireland, c.1100-c.1750’, which explores women's access to justice across Britain and Ireland between the 12th and 18th centuries. Shepard also leads a Leverhulme International Network Grant on “Producing Change: Gender and Work in Early Modern Europe", awarded in 2015.

She has previously taught and researched at St John's College, Oxford, the University of Sussex and Christ's College, Cambridge. Her PhD thesis studied Early Modern student life at Cambridge University, and in particular how undergraduate students expressed their male identities. The thesis was supervised by Keith Wrightson.

== Awards ==
Shepard won the Leo Gershoy Award in 2016 for second book, Accounting for Oneself, published in February 2015; an annual prize awarded by the American Historical Association for outstanding works published on 17th- and 18th-century European history’. The book, a culmination of a decade of work, examines how ordinary people valued themselves and understood social order and self-esteem, using innovative methods of historiography. Shepard used over 13,000 witness statements, of which 3,331 were by women, made between the years 1550 to 1728 in church courts and Cambridge University courts, to examine the relationship between wealth, occupation and social identity.

In 2004, whilst at Christ's College, Cambridge, Shepard was awarded a Philip Leverhulme Prize. In 2017, Shepard received a Leverhulme Research Fellowships for research on family and economy in England, 1660–1815.

== Personal life ==
Shepard married engineering scientist Jason Reese, latterly Regius Professor of Engineering at the University of Edinburgh, in 2001. Their daughter Zoe was born in 2007. Reese died of a suspected heart attack in March 2019.

== Bibliography ==
- The Whole Economy: Gender and Work in Early Modern Europe (co-editor with Catriona Macleod and Maria Ågren; Cambridge: Cambridge University Press, 2023) ISBN 9781009359351
- Accounting for Oneself: Worth, Status and the Social Order in Early Modern England (Oxford: Oxford University Press, 2015) ISBN 9780199600793
- Remaking English Society: Social Relations and Social Change in Early Modern England (co-editor with Steve Hindle and John Walter; Woodbridge: Boydell Press, 2013) ISBN 9781843837961
- Meanings of Manhood in Early Modern England, 1560-1640 (Oxford: Oxford University Press, 2003) ISBN 9780198208181
- Communities in Early Modern England: Networks, Place, Rhetoric (co-editor with P. J. Withington; Manchester: Manchester University Press, 2000) ISBN 0719054761
