= Timothy Tackett =

American historian (born 1945)

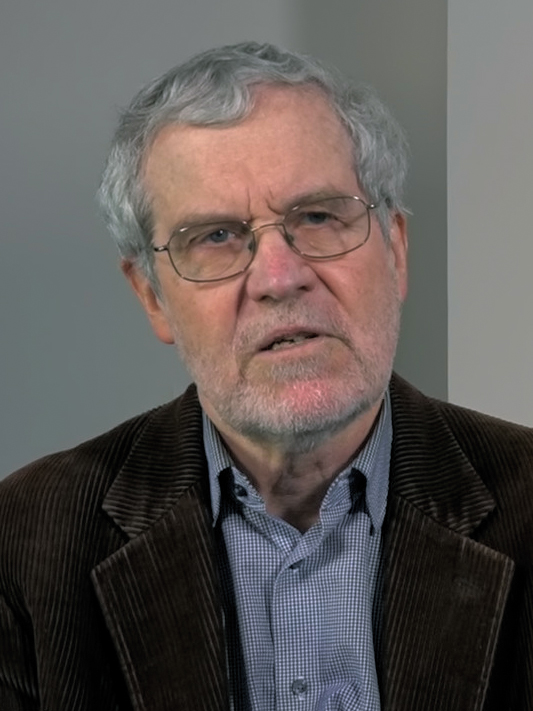
Timothy Tackett (2018)

Timothy Tackett (born 1945) is an American historian specializing in the French Revolution and professor emeritus at the University of California, Irvine.

His 1996 book about the members of the National Constituent Assembly of 1789 won the Leo Gershoy Award of the American Historical Association in 2001; he has also written about the Flight to Varennes and the emergence of the Terror amid the turbulence of the Revolution.

== Works ==
- Priest & Parish in Eighteenth-Century France: A Social and Political Study of the Cures in a Diocese of Dauphine, 1750-1791, Princeton University Press, 1977, 368 p.
- La Révolution, l'Église, la France, Cerf, 1986.
- Religion, Revolution, and Regional Culture in Eighteenth-Century France: The Ecclesiastical Oath of 1791, Princeton University Press, 1986, 448 p.
- The West in France in 1789: The Religious Factor in the Origins of the Counterrevolution, Journal of Modern History 54 (1982): 715-45
- Par la volonté du peuple, comment les députés sont devenus révolutionnaires, Albin Michel, 1997.
- Becoming a Revolutionary: The Deputies of the French National Assembly and the Emergence of a Revolutionary Culture (1789-1790), Princeton University Press, 1997, 355 p.
- When the King Took Flight, Cambridge: Harvard University Press, 2003.
- Le Roi s'enfuit - Varennes et l'origine de la Terreur, Éditions La Découverte, 2004.
- Stewart J. Brown, Timothy Tackett (ed.), The Cambridge History of Christianity (vol 7): Enlightenment, Reawakening And Revolution 1660-1815, Cambridge University Press, 2006, 694 p.
- The Coming of the Terror in the French Revolution, Cambridge: Harvard University Press, 2015.
- The Glory and the Sorrow: A Parisian and His World in the Age of the French Revolution, Oxford University Press, 2021.
