= John C. Rule =

American historian (1929–2013)

John Corwin Rule
- Born: March 2, 1929; Warren, Indiana
- Died: January 12, 2013 (aged 83); Columbus, Ohio
- Awards: Leo Gershoy Award

Academic background
- Education: Stanford University, Harvard University

Academic work
- Discipline: Historian
- Institutions: Ohio State University
- Main interests: French history
- Notable works: A World of Paper

John Corwin Rule (2 March 1929 Warren, Indiana – 12 January 2013 Columbus, Ohio) was a widely respected historian of seventeenth- and eighteenth-century French history at Ohio State University from 1958 to 1995.

== Early life and education ==
The son of Corwin Rule and Elaine Rule, John Rule attended Broad Ripple High School in Indianapolis, Indiana and went on to graduate from Stanford University with a bachelor's degree and a master's degree in history in 1952 with a thesis on "Nicolas de Lamoignon de Basville and the Protestants of the Languedoc, 1685-1702." He went on to Harvard University, where he completed his doctorate in history in 1958 with a thesis on "The preliminary negotiations leading to the Peace of Utrecht, 1709-1712".

== Academic career ==
In his final year of graduate study at Harvard in 1957–58, Rule taught history at Northeastern University in Boston, Massachusetts, then joined the faculty at Ohio State University, where he retired as professor emeritus in 1995. He served as associate editor of the journal French Historical Studies and was awarded research grants from the American Philosophical Society, the National Endowment for the Humanities, the Folger Library, and the Huntington Library.

His last book, A World of Paper (co-written with Ben S. Trotter) won the American Historical Association's Leo Gershoy Award in 2015.

The Ohio State University Foundation established in his memory the Elaine S. and John C. Rule Study Abroad Fund for graduate student travel.

== Published works ==
Books

- A select bibliography for students of history, edited by John C. Rule, et al. (1957).
- Bibliography of works in the philosophy of history, 1945-1957, edited by John C. Rule, et al. (1961).
- The character of Philip II: the problem of moral judgments in history (1963).
- Louis XIV and the craft of kingship (1969).
- Louis XIV (1973)
- Observations from the Hague and Utrecht: William Harrison's letters to Henry Watkins, 1711-1712, edited by Linda Frey, Marsha Frey, and John C. Rule. (1979)
- A World of Paper: Louis XIV, Colbert de Torcy, and the Rise of the Information State, by John C. Rule and Ben S. Trotter (2014)

Contributions

- "The Old Regime in America: A Review of Recent Interpretations of France in America" in The William and Mary Quarterly, Third Series, Vol. 19, No. 4, (1962).
- "Paul Vaucher: Historian" in French Historical Studies, Vol. 5, No. 1, (Spring 1967).
- "William F. Church, 1912-1977" by A. Lloyd Moote and John C. Rule in French Historical Studies, Vol. 10, No. 3, (Spring 1978).
- "France caught between two balances: the dilemma of 1688" in The Revolution of 1688-1689: changing perspectives, edited by Lois G. Schwoerer (1992).
- "A Career in the Making: The Education of Jean-Baptiste Colbert, Marquis de Torcy" in French Historical Studies, Vol. 19, No. 4, (Autumn 1996).
- "The king in his council: Louis XIV and the Conseil d'en haut" in Royal and republican sovereignty in early modern Europe: essays in memory of Ragnhild Hatton, edited by Robert Oresko, G.C. Gibbs, and H.M. Scott (1997).
