= Craig James (footballer, born 1982) =

English footballer (born 1982)

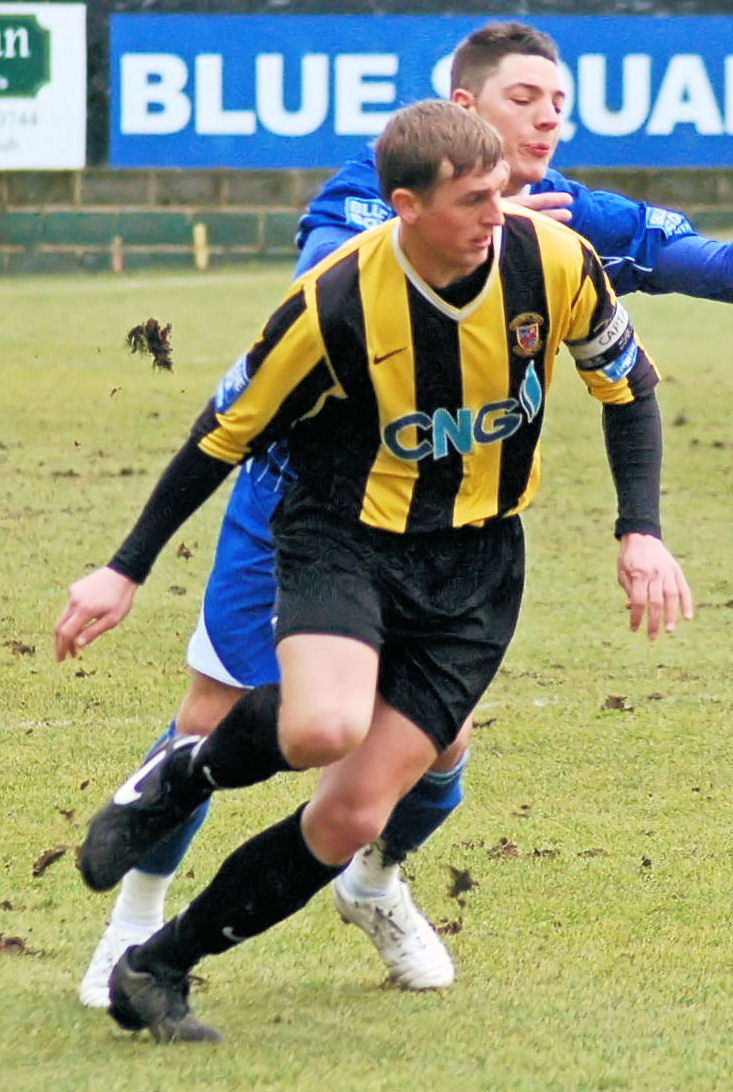
- James playing for Harrogate Town in 2010

Personal information
- Full name: Craig Peter James
- Date of birth: 15 November 1982 (age 43)
- Place of birth: Middlesbrough, England
- Height: 6 ft 0 in (1.83 m)
- Position: Defender

Senior career*
| Years | Team | Apps | (Gls) |
| 2002–2004 | Sunderland | 1 | (0) |
| 2002–2003 | → Hibernian (loan) | 22 | (2) |
| 2003–2004 | → Darlington (loan) | 10 | (1) |
| 2004–2006 | Port Vale | 73 | (1) |
| 2006–2007 | Darlington | 23 | (0) |
| 2007 | → York City (loan) | 8 | (0) |
| 2007–2008 | Livingston | 29 | (0) |
| 2008 | Barrow | 0 | (0) |
| 2009–2011 | Harrogate Town | 48 | (4) |
| Total | | 214 | (8) |
- * Club domestic league appearances and goals

Craig Peter James (born 15 November 1982) is an English former footballer who played as a defender.

James started his career with Sunderland in 2002. Following loan spells at Hibernian and Darlington, he moved on to Port Vale two years later. James transferred to Darlington permanently in 2006 but was loaned out to York City the following year before signing with Livingston. After a season with Livingston, he joined Barrow without making an appearance. He returned to the game with non-League Harrogate Town in 2009, where he stayed for two years.

== Early and later life ==
Craig Peter James was born in Middlesbrough on 15 November 1982. After his retirement from professional football, James worked as a scaffolder on oil rigs.

== Career ==
=== Sunderland ===
James started his career with Sunderland, though he was never given a first-team opportunity by manager Peter Reid. He was signed by Scottish Premier League side Hibernian on a year-long loan in August 2002. The Hibees had a string of long-term injuries to players like John O'Neil, Mathias Jack, János Mátyus and Frédéric Arpinon. He scored what seemed to be a winning goal in the Edinburgh derby against Heart of Midlothian at Easter Road on 2 January, before three goals after 90 minutes ended the game in a 4–4 draw. He was forced to return to Sunderland because of a knee injury in April 2003. In his absence, Sunderland had finished bottom of the English Premier League, and James returned to the Stadium of Light with a glowing reference given to Mick McCarthy by Hibs manager Bobby Williamson. On 16 September 2003, James made his First Division debut for Sunderland in a 3–1 defeat at Stoke City, where he was held responsible for two Stoke goals. McCarthy, however, said such criticism was "very harsh".

He joined Darlington on a month-long loan in November 2003, which was later extended for a second month. James rejected the chance to stay for a third month. Manager David Hodgson was keen to bring him to The Darlington Arena on a permanent basis, saying "All Craig needs to do is pick up the phone and ring me".

=== Port Vale ===
He was signed by Martin Foyle's Port Vale on a one-month loan in March 2004. The next month, James was signed by Vale on a two-year permanent contract; as the previous loan deal was agreed before the transfer deadline, the deal could be made permanent. He made 33 appearances for the club in his first full season, missing three months with a knee injury. In his second season at Vale Park, he made a total of 42 appearances but was released by the club at the end of his contract.

=== Darlington ===
Darlington re-signed James in August 2006. He was sent off in the League Cup giantkilling at Stoke City. He fell out of the first-team picture after manager Dave Penney signed Evan Horwood on loan, and was sent off for a second time and did not feature after 3 February. He signed for York City of the Conference National on loan for the rest of the 2006–07 season in March 2007. He was put straight into the staring eleven by manager Billy McEwan. He was an ever-present in the team's starting line-up. In May 2007, he was released by Darlington and was not offered a contract at York.

=== Later career ===
He signed for Scottish First Division side Livingston on a one-year contract in August 2007 after a successful trial period with the club. They were managed by former Sunderland midfielder Mark Proctor and struggled to two wins in the first ten games of the 2007–08 season. Livingston improved to a seventh-place finish, with James featuring 34 times at left-back. He left the Almondvale Stadium after he was released at the end of his contract in May 2008. He signed for Conference Premier team Barrow on a one-month contract in September. He had a trial with former club Darlington in July 2009 but was not offered a contract after failing to impress.

James's next club would be Conference North side Harrogate Town. His debut for Town came on 31 October 2009 against Redditch United. His first goal for the club arrived against Gainsborough Trinity in a 2–0 win on 13 February 2010. He was released from Harrogate in May 2011 after his contract was not renewed for the new season.

== Style of play ==
James was a left-footed and left-sided defender.

== Career statistics ==
Appearances and goals by club, season and competition
| Club | Season | League | | | FA Cup | | League Cup | | Other | | Total | |
| Club | Season | Division | Apps | Goals | Apps | Goals | Apps | Goals | Apps | Goals | Apps | Goals |
|---|---|---|---|---|---|---|---|---|---|---|---|---|
| Sunderland | 2002–03 | Premier League | 0 | 0 | 0 | 0 | 0 | 0 | — | | 0 | 0 |
| Sunderland | 2003–04 | First Division | 1 | 0 | 0 | 0 | 1 | 0 | 0 | 0 | 2 | 0 |
| Sunderland | Total | | 1 | 0 | 0 | 0 | 1 | 0 | 0 | 0 | 2 | 0 |
| Hibernian (loan) | 2002–03 | SPL | 22 | 2 | 2 | 0 | 1 | 0 | 0 | 0 | 25 | 2 |
| Darlington (loan) | 2003–04 | Third Division | 10 | 1 | 0 | 0 | 0 | 0 | 0 | 0 | 10 | 1 |
| Port Vale | 2003–04 | Second Division | 8 | 0 | 0 | 0 | 0 | 0 | 0 | 0 | 8 | 0 |
| Port Vale | 2004–05 | League One | 30 | 1 | 0 | 0 | 1 | 0 | 2 (Note: Appearance(s) in the EFL Trophy.) | 0 | 33 | 1 |
| Port Vale | 2005–06 | League One | 35 | 0 | 5 | 0 | 1 | 0 | 1 | 0 | 42 | 0 |
| Port Vale | Total | | 73 | 1 | 5 | 0 | 2 | 0 | 3 | 0 | 83 | 1 |
| Darlington | 2006–07 | League Two | 23 | 0 | 2 | 0 | 2 | 0 | 2 | 0 | 29 | 0 |
| York City (loan) | 2006–07 | Conference National | 8 | 0 | 0 | 0 | — | | 2 (Note: Appearance(s) in the play-offs.) | 0 | 10 | 0 |
| Livingston | 2007–08 | Scottish First Division | 29 | 0 | 4 | 0 | 1 | 0 | 0 | 0 | 34 | 0 |
| Barrow | 2008–09 | Conference Premier | 0 | 0 | 0 | 0 | — | | 0 | 0 | 0 | 0 |
| Harrogate Town | 2009–10 | Conference North | 22 | 1 | 0 | 0 | — | | 2 | 0 | 24 | 1 |
| Harrogate Town | 2010–11 | Conference North | 26 | 3 | 1 | 0 | — | | 1 (Note: Appearance(s) in the FA Trophy.) | 0 | 28 | 3 |
| Harrogate Town | Total | | 48 | 4 | 1 | 0 | 0 | 0 | 3 | 0 | 52 | 4 |
| Career total | | | 214 | 8 | 14 | 0 | 7 | 0 | 10 | 0 | 245 | 8 |
