= Anne Goldgar =

American historian, author and academic

Anne Hartman Goldgar
- Occupations: Historian, author

Academic background
- Education: Princeton University; Harvard University (MA, PhD)
- Thesis: Gentlemen and Scholars: Conduct and Community in the Republic of Letters, 1680-1750 (1990)

Anne Goldgar is an American historian, author and academic, specializing in seventeenth and eighteenth century European cultural and social history, and of Francophone culture across Europe. She holds the inaugural Van Hunnick Chair in European History at the University of Southern California Dornsife. She was previously professor of early modern history at King's College London, UK. In 2016/7 she was a Descartes Theme Group Fellow at the Netherlands Institute for Advanced Study in the Humanities and Social Sciences.

== Education ==
She is a graduate of Princeton University and received her M.A. and PhD from Harvard University. Her dissertation was entitled: Gentlemen and Scholars: Conduct and Community in the Republic of Letters, 1680-1750.

== Works ==
Goldgar is the author and editor of several books including: Tulipmania: Money, Honor and Knowledge in the Dutch Golden Age (University of Chicago Press, 2008). In his review for the Financial Times, Simon Kuper states that: 'Goldgar tells us at the start of her excellent debunking book: "Most of what we have heard of [tulipmania] is not true.". . . She tells a new story.'.

In 1995, she published Impolite Learning: Conduct and Community in the Republic of Letters, 1680-1750 (Yale University Press). She is the editor of Institutional Culture in Early Modern Society, along with Robert Frost (Brill Academic Publishers, 2004).

Goldgar published the peer-reviewed article, 'The British Museum and the Virtual Representation of Culture in the Eighteenth Century', Albion: A Quarterly Journal Concerned with British Studies, 2000, Vol.32 (2), p. 195-231.

== Bibliography ==
- Impolite Learning: Conduct and Community in the Republic of Letters, 1680-1750 (New Haven: Yale University Press, 1995)
- 'The British Museum and the Virtual Representation of Culture in the Eighteenth Century', Albion: A Quarterly Journal Concerned with British Studies, vol. 32, no. 2 (Summer, 2000) 195-231
- Institutional Culture in Early Modern Society (Leiden: Brill, 2004)
- 'Poelenburch's Garden: Art, Flowers, Networks, and Knowledge in Seventeenth-Century Holland', In His Milieu: Essays on Netherlandish Art in Memory of John Michael Montias, edited by A. Golahny et al. (Amsterdam University Press, Amsterdam, 2006) 183–192
- Tulipmania: Money, Honor, and Knowledge in the Dutch Golden Age (Chicago: University of Chicago Press, 2007)
- 'Wine as a Luxury at the Dutch Factory in Japan during the Second Half of the 18th Century', Luxury in the Low Countries: Miscellaneous Reflections on Netherlandish Material Culture, 1500 to the Present, edited by Rengenier C. Rittersma (Brussels: Pharo, 2010)
