= Simon Eldershaw =

English footballer

Personal information
- Full name: Simon Eldershaw
- Date of birth: 3 December 1983 (age 42)
- Place of birth: Stoke-on-Trent, England
- Height: 5 ft 10 in (1.78 m)
- Position: Striker

Youth career
- 1991–2000: Port Vale

Senior career*
| Years | Team | Apps | (Gls) |
| 2000–2005 | Port Vale | 15 | (1) |
| 2005 | Northwich Victoria | | |
| 2005–2006 | Leek Town | 51 | (6) |
| 2006 | Nantwich Town | | |
| 2006–2007 | Alsager Town | | |
| 2007 | → Newcastle Town (loan) | | |
| 2007–2008 | Newcastle Town | | |
| 2008 | Kidsgrove Athletic | 2 | (0) |
| 2009–2011 | Stone Dominoes | | |
- * Club domestic league appearances and goals

Simon Eldershaw (born 3 December 1983) is an English former professional footballer.

== Career ==
Eldershaw started his career with Port Vale, joining the club's centre of excellence at the age of seven after being scouted by Jim Cooper. He scored his first senior goal for the "Valiants" in a 2–1 defeat at Huddersfield Town on Boxing Day 2004. He was only to make 15 appearances though, before being released by manager Martin Foyle in May 2005.

Following his release he had a trial with Kidderminster Harriers, before having spells with local non-League teams Northwich Victoria, Leek Town, Nantwich Town, Alsager Town and Newcastle Town. He turned out in two league and one FA Cup qualifier game for Kidsgrove Athletic in the 2008–09 season.

He graduated from the Open University with a degree in IT. He became a teacher, and taught in the IT Department at St Thomas More Catholic Academy in Stoke-on-Trent. He later became a teacher at Alleyne's High School in Stone, Staffordshire, also playing for local non-League team Stone Dominoes from August 2009. Stone finished as champions of the North West Counties League Division One in 2009–10, before retraining their Premier Division status in 2010–11 and 2011–12.

== Career statistics ==
Appearances and goals by club, season and competition
| Club | Season | League | | | FA Cup | | Other | | Total | |
| Club | Season | Division | Apps | Goals | Apps | Goals | Apps | Goals | Apps | Goals |
|---|---|---|---|---|---|---|---|---|---|---|
| Port Vale | 2002–03 | Second Division | 2 | 0 | 0 | 0 | 0 | 0 | 2 | 0 |
| Port Vale | 2003–04 | Second Division | 0 | 0 | 0 | 0 | 0 | 0 | 0 | 0 |
| Port Vale | 2004–05 | League One | 13 | 1 | 0 | 0 | 0 | 0 | 13 | 1 |
| Port Vale | Total | | 15 | 1 | 0 | 0 | 0 | 0 | 15 | 1 |
| Leek Town | 2005–06 | Northern Premier League; Premier Division | 36 | 4 | 4 | 1 | 6 | 1 | 46 | 6 |
| Leek Town | 2006–07 | Northern Premier League; Premier Division | 15 | 2 | 2 | 0 | 1 | 0 | 18 | 2 |
| Leek Town | Total | | 51 | 6 | 6 | 1 | 7 | 1 | 64 | 8 |

== Honours ==
Stone Dominoes

- North West Counties Football League Division One: 2009–10
