= Adam Legzdins =

English footballer (born 1986)

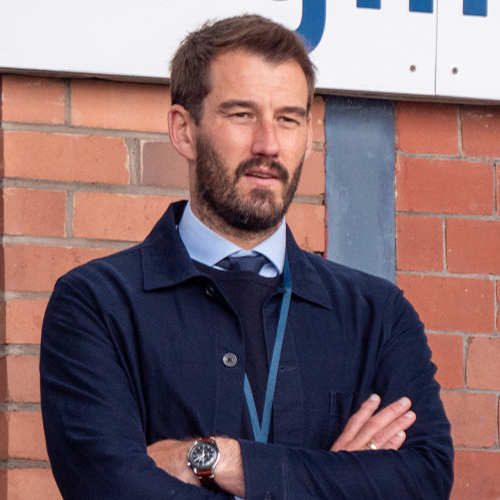
- Legzdins in 2024

Personal information
- Full name: Adam Richard Legzdins
- Date of birth: 28 November 1986 (age 39)
- Place of birth: Penkridge, Staffordshire, England
- Height: 6 ft 3 in (1.91 m)
- Position: Goalkeeper

Youth career
- –2005: Birmingham City

Senior career*
Years	Team	Apps	(Gls)
2005–2008	Birmingham City	0	(0)
2005	→ Alfreton Town (loan)	2	(0)
2005–2006	→ Halifax Town (loan)	10	(0)
2006–2007	→ Oldham Athletic (loan)	0	(0)
2007	→ Macclesfield Town (loan)	0	(0)
2007–2008	→ Halifax Town (loan)	30	(0)
2008–2010	Crewe Alexandra	6	(0)
2009	→ Weymouth (loan)	8	(0)
2010–2011	Burton Albion	46	(0)
2011–2014	Derby County	35	(0)
2012	→ Burton Albion (loan)	1	(0)
2014–2015	Leyton Orient	11	(0)
2015–2017	Birmingham City	15	(0)
2017–2020	Burnley	0	(0)
2020–2025	Dundee	59	(0)
Total		223	(0)
- * Club domestic league appearances and goals

Adam Richard Legzdins (born 28 November 1986) is an English former professional footballer who played as a goalkeeper. He currently works in an operations role for Scottish Premiership club Dundee.

Legzdins began his career with Birmingham City, from where he spent time on loan at several lower-division clubs but never played first-team football for his parent club. In 2008, he joined Crewe Alexandra, with whom he made his debut in the Football League, but played only infrequently. He spent the 2010–11 season as Football League Two club Burton Albion's first-choice goalkeeper, earning himself a move to Derby County of the Football League Championship. He played 35 matches over three seasons with Derby, mainly in 2012–13, and after a year with Leyton Orient, he rejoined Birmingham City in 2015. After two seasons and 21 appearances, he signed for Burnley, where he remained for three years but never made it to the first team. In November 2020, he signed for Dundee, spending 5 years at the club and earning 2 promotions before retiring from playing in 2025 and joining the club’s operations team.

While being English, Legzdins qualified to play international football for Latvia via his paternal grandparents.

== Career ==
=== Early career ===
Legzdins was born in Penkridge, Staffordshire. He came through Birmingham City's Academy system and played his first competitive football in October 2005 on loan at Alfreton Town in the Conference North, four games which included a man of the match performance away at Hereford United in the FA Cup. He then joined Halifax Town of the Conference National on a work experience basis, where he played 11 games before Birmingham recalled him, concerned that regular first-team football for Halifax combined with playing for Birmingham's reserve team was too much for the 19-year-old.

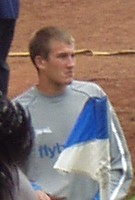
Warming up before a Championship match at Cardiff City, August 2006

Legzdins signed his first one-year professional contract in the summer of 2006. Early in the 2006–07 he was given a Birmingham squad number because of an injury to first choice keeper Maik Taylor, and was an unused substitute in their Championship match at Cardiff City. In October 2006 he joined Oldham Athletic on loan where he acted as backup to Les Pogliacomi, making one substitute appearance in the Football League Trophy. He then joined Macclesfield Town on loan and was expected to go straight into the starting eleven due to injury and suspension, but manager Paul Ince chose goalkeeping coach David Rouse instead, and Legzdins completed his month's loan without appearing for the club. He played an active part in helping Birmingham reserves to the championship of the Central League Division One Central in 2006–07.

Legzdins was given a further year's contract in summer 2007, and rejoined Halifax on a three months' loan in October 2007, where he played regularly in preference to the more experienced Craig Mawson. He extended his loan at Halifax until the end of the 2007–08 season in January 2008, and on 9 June 2008 he signed for Crewe Alexandra as a replacement for their departing goalkeepers Ben Williams and Owain Fôn Williams. He joined Weymouth on a month's loan on 26 March 2009.

Legzdins made his first team debut for Crewe in the League Cup defeat to Blackpool on 11 August 2009, after loan goalkeeper David Button returned to Tottenham Hotspur, and followed this up with his debut in the Football League on 22 August, keeping a clean sheet in the 1–0 home win against Hereford United.

=== Burton Albion ===
He rejected a new one-year contract with Crewe in May 2010 and subsequently signed for League Two team Burton Albion on a two-year contract on 1 July. He kept a clean sheet on his full debut on 7 August 2010 in a 0–0 draw against Oxford United. After playing in every League game of the 2010–11 season, he was voted Burton Albion Supporters' Player of the Year and Players' Player of the Year.

=== Derby County ===
After lengthy speculation, on 29 June 2011, it was confirmed that Burton and Championship outfit Derby County had agreed a transfer fee that would allow Legzdins to join the Pride Park club. The transfer was completed on 1 July; Legzdins signed a three-year contract. Derby manager Nigel Clough said that he would be backup to first choice keeper Frank Fielding. Legzdins made his debut for Derby away at Nottingham Forest after Fielding was sent off after only a minute, and contributed to a 2–1 win against their local rivals. On 20 March 2012, Legzdins rejoined former club Burton Albion on a month's emergency loan. He was restricted to just one appearance by a hip injury suffered in a 1–0 defeat against Northampton Town and returned to Derby on 17 April. He eventually made his third appearance for Derby four days later as a half-time substitute for Fielding away at Portsmouth; Derby won 2–1. He started the final game of the season, a 1–1 draw against Peterborough United.

Legzdins again started the season as second-choice goalkeeper. After Fielding picked a groin injury in October, Legzdins returned to the starting line-up and kept his place after Fielding regained fitness in November. He impressed Clough with his performances, especially in the 2–0 win at Bristol City which ended a run of seven consecutive games without a clean sheet and a run of four away defeats. Saves against Steve Davies and Liam Fontaine were picked out by Clough, with one from Fontaine described as one "down to pure size and presence, as well as quick feet to get across his line and block it. It was a very important save." Legzdins' run of 30 consecutive first-team starts ended in March 2013 when Clough felt the need for Fielding's greater experience ahead of Derby's 2–1 win against Leicester City. Five weeks later, Legzdins returned to first-team action after Fielding was sent off for a professional foul against Peterborough United, and he started the final two games of the season, ending the season with 33 first-team appearances. After Derby signed Burnley's Lee Grant in May, Legzdins was made available for transfer with a year left on his contract.

Legzdins was originally not given a squad number for the 2013–14 season, However, after featuring in first-team pre-season friendlies he was assigned the squad number 26 in late July and went into the season as second choice to Grant.

=== Leyton Orient ===
Legzdins signed for League One club Leyton Orient on 13 June 2014. He signed a two-year contract with the East London club after being released by Derby. He left the club by mutual consent on 1 June 2015 after his appearances during the 2014–15 season were restricted by injury.

=== Birmingham City ===
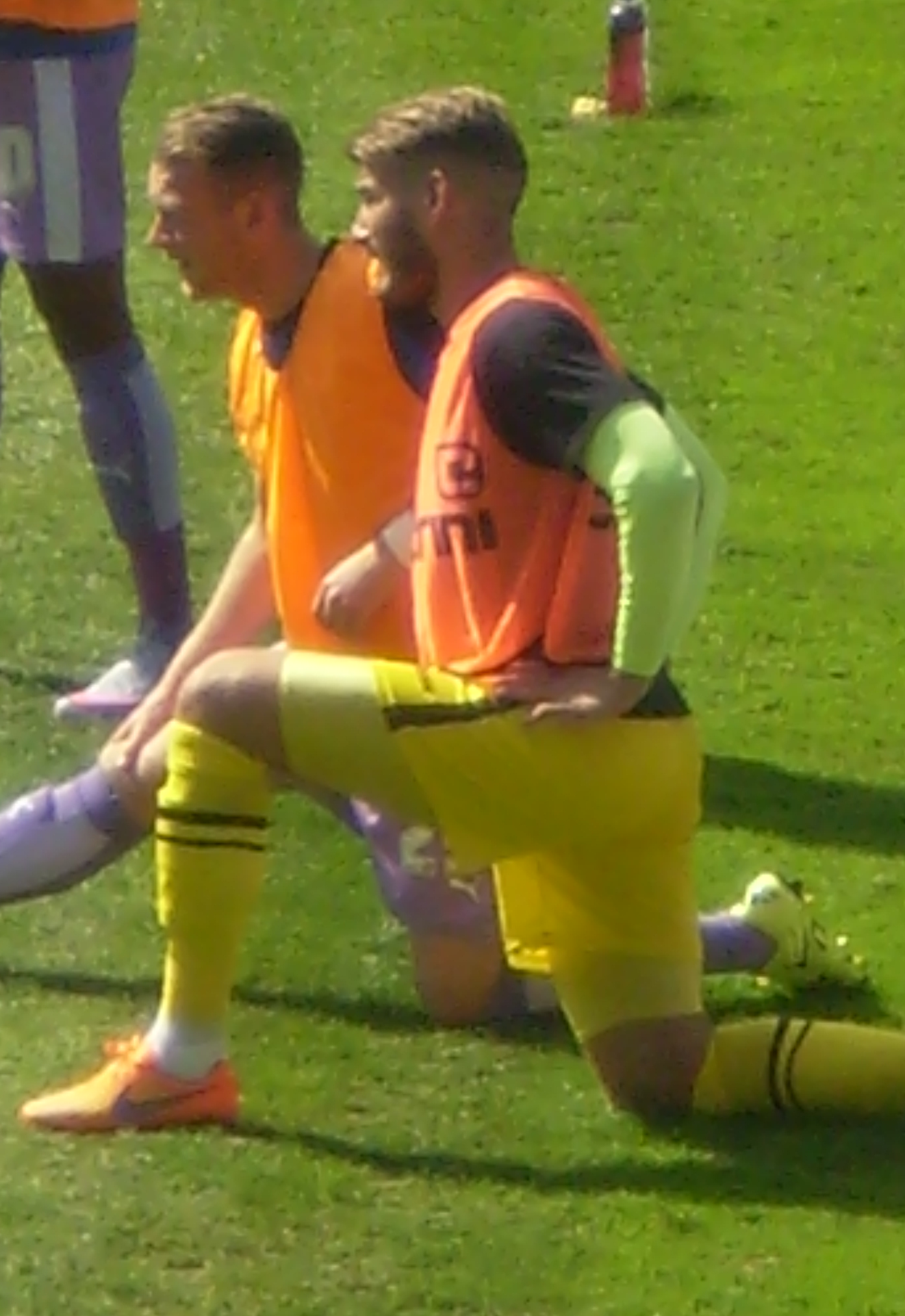
Legzdins warming up for Birmingham City in 2015

Legzdins re-joined Birmingham City on 27 June 2015; he signed a two-year deal with the option of a further year. On the bench for the opening league match of the season – Tomasz Kuszczak started – Legzdins made his Birmingham debut three days later in a 2–1 League Cup win away to Bristol Rovers. He played in two more cup matches before finally making his League debut for Birmingham on 9 April 2016; he kept a clean sheet in a 2–0 win away to Reading, and finished the season with nine appearances, of which five were inn the league.

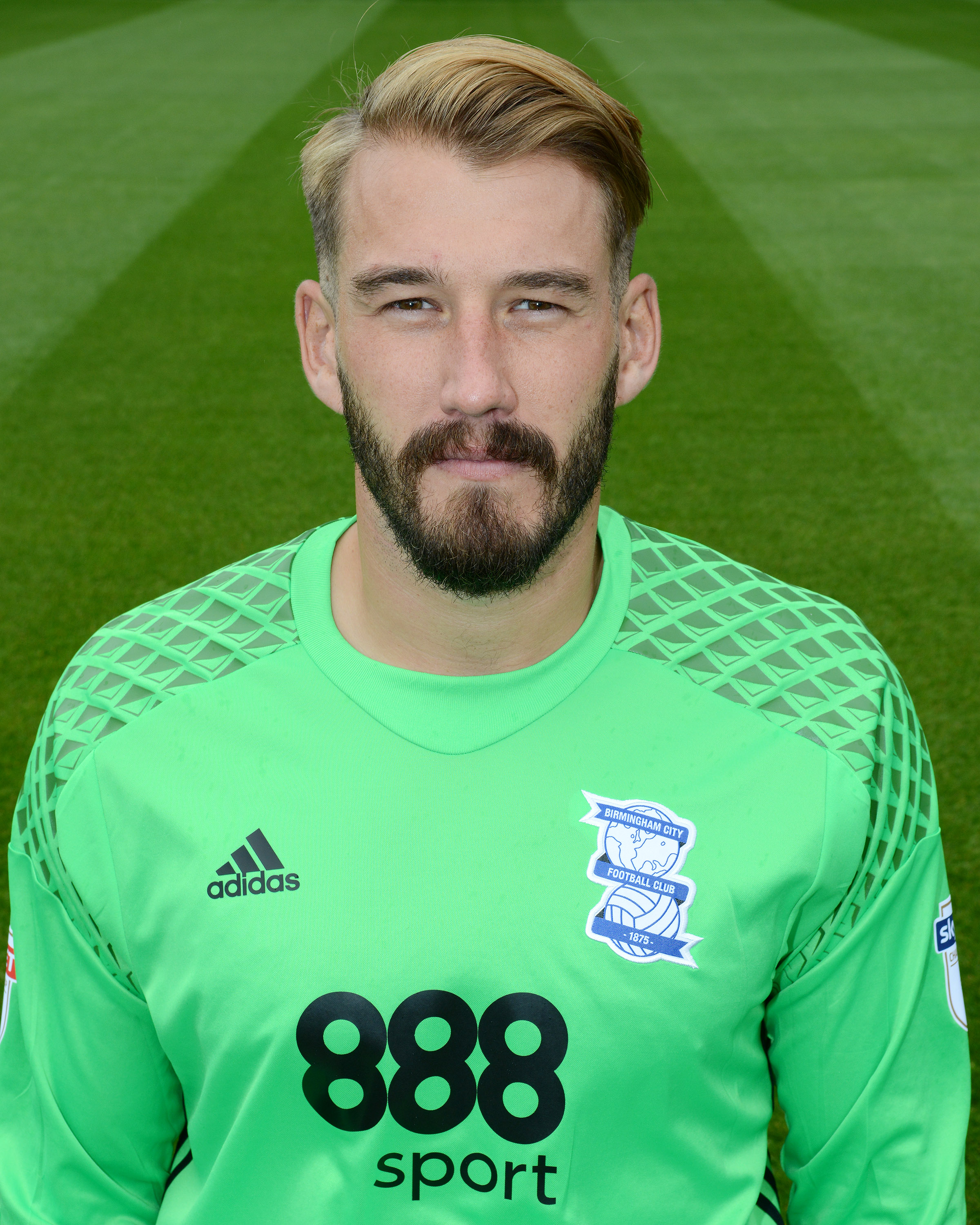
Legzdins with Birmingham City in 2016

He made his first league appearance of the 2016–17 season when Kuszczak succumbed to a pre-existing injury during the warm-up before Birmingham's match away to Reading on 13 September; he kept a clean sheet in a goalless draw. He kept his place for the next seven matches, even after Kuszczak's return to fitness, but manager Gary Rowett brought Kuszczak back into the side for the local derby against Aston Villa. He made four more appearances in the second half of the season: two in the FA Cup, and two in the league, on both occasions as a half-time substitute for the injured Kuszczak. When Birmingham took up their option to extend his contract for a further year, Legzdins said he was "absolutely delighted" to accept, in preference to offers from elsewhere, "because everybody who knows me knows how much the club means to me."

=== Burnley ===
The arrival of David Stockdale left Legzdins third in Birmingham's pecking order for 2017–18, and Premier League club Burnley were in need of a goalkeeper after Paul Robinson's retirement left them without sufficient backup for Tom Heaton. On 8 August 2017, Legzdins signed a three-year contract with Burnley; the fee was undisclosed. In the summer of 2020 Burnley released Legzdins from his contract.

=== Dundee ===
On 13 November 2020, after a trial period, Legzdins signed a deal until the end of the season with Scottish Championship side Dundee. He made his debut and first start for the club the following week against Ayr United. He would not start again until March 2021, where he would save a penalty and keep a clean sheet in a home win against Arbroath. Legzdins would help stabilise the side's issues conceding goals, and was a major factor in helping the club win the Premiership play-offs and gain promotion to the Scottish Premiership.

In June 2021, Legzdins signed a new two-year deal with Dundee, keeping him at the club until 2023. He would be sidelined from February 2022 with a persistent knee problem that would end his season. Legzdins would finally return to Dundee's matchday squad the following season in August as an unused substitute in a Scottish Championship away win against Raith Rovers. After backing up Harrison Sharp from the start of the season, Legzdins made his return to first-team play in September in a Scottish Challenge Cup game away to Welsh champions The New Saints, in which Legzdins would keep a clean sheet. Legzdins would return to being Dundee's starting goalie throughout the second half of the season and played a key role in helping the Dark Blues win the Scottish Championship and return to the top flight.

On 31 May 2023, Legzdins signed a two-year extension, keeping him at Dundee until the summer of 2025. In September 2024 it was reported that Legzdins had likely played his final game and had moved into an operations role at Dundee. On 17 June 2025, Dundee released its retained list and confirmed that Legzdins had retired from playing and would continue to work for the club in an operational role.

== Career statistics ==
As of match played 20 January 2024

Appearances and goals by club, season and competition
Club	Season	League			National cup (Note: Includes FA Cup, Scottish Cup)		League cup (Note: Includes EFL Cup, Scottish League Cup)		Other		Total	
Club	Season	Division	Apps	Goals	Apps	Goals	Apps	Goals	Apps	Goals	Apps	Goals
Birmingham City	2005–06	Premier League	0	0	0	0	0	0	—		0	0
Birmingham City	2006–07	Championship	0	0	0	0	0	0	—		0	0
Birmingham City	2007–08	Premier League	0	0	0	0	0	0	—		0	0
Birmingham City	Total		0	0	0	0	0	0	—		0	0
Alfreton Town (loan)	2005–06	Conference North	2	0	2	0	0	0	0	0	4	0
Halifax Town (loan)	2005–06	Conference	10	0	0	0	0	0	1 (Note: Appearance in FA Trophy)	0	11	0
Oldham Athletic (loan)	2006–07	League One	0	0	0	0	—		1 (Note: Appearances in Football League Trophy)	0	1	0
Macclesfield Town (loan)	2006–07	League Two	0	0	—		—		—		0	0
Halifax Town (loan)	2007–08	Conference	30	0	3	0	—		5 (Note: Three appearances in FA Trophy, two in Conference League Cup)	0	38	0
Crewe Alexandra	2008–09	League One	0	0	0	0	0	0	0	0	0	0
Crewe Alexandra	2009–10	League Two	6	0	0	0	1	0	1	0	8	0
Crewe Alexandra	Total		6	0	0	0	1	0	1	0	8	0
Weymouth (loan)	2008–09	Conference	8	0	—		—		—		8	0
Burton Albion	2010–11	League Two	46	0	4	0	1	0	0	0	51	0
Derby County	2011–12	Championship	4	0	0	0	0	0	—		4	0
Derby County	2012–13	Championship	31	0	2	0	0	0	—		33	0
Derby County	2013–14	Championship	0	0	0	0	0	0	0	0	0	0
Derby County	Total		35	0	2	0	0	0	0	0	37	0
Burton Albion (loan)	2011–12	League Two	1	0	—		—		—		1	0
Leyton Orient	2014–15	League One	11	0	0	0	0	0	2	0	13	0
Birmingham City	2015–16	Championship	5	0	1	0	2	0	—		8	0
Birmingham City	2016–17	Championship	10	0	2	0	1	0	—		13	0
Birmingham City	2017–18	Championship	0	0	—		0	0	—		0	0
Birmingham City	Total		15	0	3	0	3	0	—		21	0
Burnley	2017–18	Premier League	0	0	0	0	0	0	—		0	0
Burnley	2018–19	Premier League	0	0	0	0	0	0	0	0	0	0
Burnley	2019–20	Premier League	0	0	0	0	0	0	0	0	0	0
Burnley	Total		0	0	0	0	0	0	0	0	0	0
Dundee	2020–21	Scottish Championship	11	0	1	0	0	0	4 (Note: Appearances in the Premiership play-offs)	0	16	0
Dundee	2021–22	Scottish Premiership	24	0	0	0	5	0	—		29	0
Dundee	2022–23	Scottish Championship	24	0	2	0	1	0	2 (Note: Appearances in the Scottish Challenge Cup)	0	29	0
Dundee	2023–24	Scottish Premiership	0	0	1	0	1	0	—		2	0
Dundee	2024–25	Scottish Premiership	0	0	0	0	0	0	—		0	0
Dundee	Total		59	0	4	0	7	0	6	0	76	0
Career total			223	0	18	0	12	0	16	0	269	0

== Honours ==
Dundee

- Scottish Premiership play-offs: 2020–21
- Scottish Championship: 2022–23
