= 2006–07 Macclesfield Town F.C. season =

Macclesfield Town
2006–07 season
- Football League Two: 22nd
- FA Cup: Third Round
- League Cup: First Round
- League Trophy: First Round

The 2006–07 season saw Macclesfield Town compete in Football League Two where they finished in 22nd position with 48 points.

== Final league table ==
Pos	Team	Pld	W	D	L	GF	GA	GD	Pts	Promotion, qualification or relegation
20	Accrington Stanley	46	13	11	22	70	81	−11	50	
21	Bury	46	13	11	22	46	61	−15	50	
22	Macclesfield Town	46	12	12	22	55	77	−22	48	
23	Boston United (R)	46	12	10	24	51	80	−29	36 (Note: Boston United had 10 points deducted for entering a Company Voluntary Arrangement. They were relegated directly to the Conference North for not paying their footballing creditors.)	Relegation to Conference North
24	Torquay United (R)	46	7	14	25	36	63	−27	35	Relegation to Football Conference

Rules for classification: In the Football League goals scored (GF) takes precedence over goal difference (GD).
(R) Relegated

== Results ==
Macclesfield Town's score comes first

=== Legend ===
Win	Draw	Loss

=== Football League Two ===
==== Results summary ====
Overall								Home						Away					
Pld	W	D	L	GF	GA	GD	Pts	W	D	L	GF	GA	GD	W	D	L	GF	GA	GD
46	12	12	22	55	77	−22	48	8	7	8	36	34	+2	4	5	14	19	43	−24

==== Results by matchday ====
Round	1	2	3	4	5	6	7	8	9	10	11	12	13	14	15	16	17	18	19	20	21	22	23	24	25	26	27	28	29	30	31	32	33	34	35	36	37	38	39	40	41	42	43	44	45	46
Ground	A	H	H	A	H	A	H	A	A	H	H	A	A	H	A	H	A	H	A	H	A	H	H	A	A	H	A	H	A	H	H	H	A	H	A	H	A	A	A	H	A	H	A	H	A	H
Result	L	D	L	L	L	D	L	L	L	D	D	L	L	L	D	L	D	L	D	W	W	D	W	W	W	W	L	W	L	L	D	W	L	W	L	D	L	D	W	W	L	W	L	L	L	D
Position	24	17	21	22	24	23	24	24	24	24	24	24	24	24	24	24	24	24	24	24	24	24	24	23	23	23	23	20	22	22	22	21	21	20	20	20	20	21	19	21	21	20	21	22	22	22

Source: FootballSite
A = Away; H = Home; W = Win; D = Draw; L = Loss

Match	Date	Opponent	Venue	Result	Attendance	Scorers
1	5 August 2006	Darlington	A	0–4	4,095	
2	8 August 2006	Hartlepool United	H	0–0	1,843	
3	12 August 2006	Milton Keynes Dons	H	1–2	1,731	McIntyre
4	19 August 2006	Peterborough United	A	1–3	4,136	Swailes
5	26 August 2006	Wycombe Wanderers	H	0–2	1,574	
6	1 September 2006	Grimsby Town	A	1–1	3,638	Teague
7	9 September 2006	Barnet	H	2–3	1,770	McNeil, Tipton
8	12 September 2006	Lincoln City	A	1–2	4,184	Scott
9	16 September 2006	Walsall	A	0–2	4,657	
10	23 September 2006	Torquay United	H	3–3	1,836	Morley, Bullock, Swailes
11	26 September 2006	Chester City	H	1–1	2,022	Bullock
12	30 September 2006	Hereford United	A	0–1	2,705	
13	6 October 2006	Shrewsbury Town	A	1–2	4,816	Weir-Daley
14	14 October 2006	Bury	H	2–3	2,512	Weir-Daley, Scott
15	21 October 2006	Bristol Rovers	A	0–0	5,130	
16	28 October 2006	Mansfield Town	H	2–3	2,599	Heath, Morley
17	4 November 2006	Wrexham	A	0–0	3,568	
18	18 November 2006	Boston United	H	2–3	1,895	Heath, Regan
19	25 November 2006	Stockport County	A	1–1	6,575	McIntyre
20	5 December 2006	Rochdale	H	1–0	1,472	McNeil
21	9 December 2006	Notts County	A	2–1	4,036	Heath, McIntyre
22	16 December 2006	Accrington Stanley	H	3–3	2,242	Tolley, Bullock, Murphy
23	23 December 2006	Swindon Town	H	2–1	2,377	Murphy, Swailes
24	26 December 2006	Chester City	A	3–0	3,365	Murphy, Tipton, McIntyre
25	30 December 2006	Torquay United	A	1–0	2,169	Morley
26	1 January 2007	Lincoln City	H	2–1	2,869	McIntyre (2)
27	13 January 2007	Barnet	A	0–1	2,018	
28	20 January 2007	Hereford United	H	3–0	2,949	McIntyre, Murphy (2)
29	27 January 2007	Swindon Town	A	0–2	6,062	
30	30 January 2007	Walsall	H	0–2	2,006	
31	3 February 2007	Darlington	H	1–1	2,173	Navarro
32	17 February 2007	Peterborough United	H	2–1	2,274	Navarro, Bullock
33	20 February 2007	Hartlepool United	A	2–3	5,242	Hadfield, Tipton
34	24 February 2007	Grimsby Town	H	2–1	2,598	McIntyre, Heath
35	3 March 2007	Wycombe Wanderers	A	0–3	5,420	
36	10 March 2007	Shrewsbury Town	H	2–2	2,982	Tipton (2)
37	13 March 2007	Milton Keynes Dons	A	0–3	5,681	
38	17 March 2007	Bury	A	1–1	2,561	McIntyre
39	23 March 2007	Mansfield Town	A	2–1	2,414	McNeil, Miles
40	7 April 2007	Wrexham	H	2–0	4,142	McNeil, Murphy
41	9 April 2007	Boston United	A	1–4	1,816	Holgate
42	14 April 2007	Stockport County	H	2–0	4,451	Murphy, Miles
43	21 April 2007	Rochdale	A	0–5	2,989	
44	24 April 2007	Bristol Rovers	H	0–1	1,940	
45	28 April 2007	Accrington Stanley	A	2–3	3,012	Miles (2)
46	5 May 2007	Notts County	H	1–1	4,114	Miles

=== FA Cup ===
Match	Date	Opponent	Venue	Result	Attendance	Scorers
R1	13 November 2006	Walsall	H	0–0	2,018	
R1 Replay	21 November 2006	Walsall	A	1–0	3,114	McNulty
R2	2 December 2006	Hartlepool United	H	2–1	1,992	McIntyre, Murphy
R3	6 January 2007	Chelsea	A	1–6	41,434	Murphy

=== Football League Cup ===
Match	Date	Opponent	Venue	Result	Attendance	Scorers
R1	22 August 2006	Leicester City	A	0–2	6,298	

=== Football League Trophy ===
Match	Date	Opponent	Venue	Result	Attendance	Scorers
R1	17 October 2006	Stockport County	H	0–1	1,792	

== Squad statistics ==
No.	Pos.	Name	League		FA Cup		League Cup		Other		Total	
No.	Pos.	Name	Apps	Goals	Apps	Goals	Apps	Goals	Apps	Goals	Apps	Goals
1	GK	(England) Jonny Brain	9	0	2	0	1	0	1	0	13	0
2	DF	(England) Carl Regan	36(2)	1	3	0	1	0	0(1)	0	40(3)	1
3	DF	(England) Andrew Smart	0	0	0	0	0	0	0	0	0	0
4	DF	(England) Dave Morley	35	3	2	0	0	0	1	0	38	3
5	DF	(England) Danny Swailes	38	3	4	0	1	0	1	0	44	3
6	MF	(England) Martin Bullock	38(5)	4	4	0	0	0	0	0	42(5)	4
7	MF	(England) Alan Navarro	28(4)	2	4	0	1	0	1	0	34(4)	2
8	FW	(England) Colin Heath	16(9)	4	3(1)	0	1	0	1	0	21(10)	4
9	FW	(England) Matty McNeil	26(4)	4	2(2)	0	0	0	0(1)	0	28(7)	4
10	FW	(England) John Miles	23(7)	5	0(1)	0	1	0	0	0	28(8)	5
11	MF	(England) Jamie Tolley	22(1)	1	2(2)	0	1	0	1	0	26(3)	1
12	FW	(Wales) Matthew Tipton	15(18)	5	0	0	0	0	0	0	15(18)	5
12	FW	(England) Marvin Robinson	5	0	0	0	0	0	1	0	6	0
13	GK	(England) Tommy Lee	34	0	1	0	0	0	0	0	35	0
14	DF	(England) Kevin McIntyre	43(1)	9	4	1	0	0	1	0	48(1)	10
15	DF	(England) Ian Brightwell	4	0	0	0	0	1	0	0	5	0
16	MF	(England) Izak Reid	2(6)	0	0	0	0	0	0	0	2(6)	0
17	MF	(England) Jordan Hadfield	30(7)	1	3(1)	0	0(1)	0	1	0	34(9)	1
18	DF	(England) Andrew Teague	10(3)	1	1	0	1	0	0(1)	0	12(4)	1
19	MF	(England) James Jennings	5(4)	0	0(2)	0	0	0	0	0	5(6)	0
20	FW	(England) Marvin McDonald	0	0	0	0	0(1)	0	0	0	0(1)	0
21	MF	(Scotland) Jimmy McNulty	15	0	1(1)	1	1	0	1	0	18(1)	1
22	GK	(Bosnia and Herzegovina) Asmir Begović	2(1)	0	1	0	0	0	0	0	3(1)	0
23	MF	(England) Adam Murray	8(3)	0	0	0	0	0	0	0	8(3)	0
23	MF	(England) Spencer Weir-Daley	5(2)	2	0	0	0	0	1	0	6(2)	2
24	DF	(England) Rob Scott	22(4)	2	2	0	0	0	1	0	25(4)	2
25	MF	(England) Paul Ince	0(1)	0	0	0	0	0	0	0	0(1)	0
26	FW	(England) John Murphy	25(4)	7	3	2	0	0	0	0	28(4)	9
27	MF	(England) Simon Wiles	2(5)	0	2	0	0	0	0	0	4(5)	0
29	FW	(England) Nick Blackman	0(1)	0	0	0	0	0	0	0	0(1)	0
31	GK	(England) David Rouse	1	0	0	0	0	0	0	0	1	0
33	DF	(England) Nathan D'Laryea	1	0	0	0	0	0	0	0	1	0
34	FW	(Republic of Ireland) Robbie Doyle	0(2)	0	0	0	0	0	0	0	0(2)	0
35	FW	(England) Ashan Holgate	2(4)	1	0	0	0	0	0	0	2(4)	1
36	FW	(England) Isaiah Rankin	1(3)	0	0	0	0	0	0	0	1(3)	0
37	FW	(England) Ronayne Benjamin	0(2)	0	0	0	0	0	0	0	0(2)	0
