= 2005–06 Manchester United F.C. season =

English football club season

Manchester United
2005–06 season
- Chairman: Joel & Avram Glazer
- Manager: Sir Alex Ferguson
- Stadium: Old Trafford
- FA Premier League: 2nd
- FA Cup: Fifth round
- League Cup: Winners
- UEFA Champions League: Group stage
- Top goalscorer: League: Ruud van Nistelrooy (21); All: Ruud van Nistelrooy (24)
- Highest home attendance: 73,006 vs Charlton Athletic (7 May 2006)
- Lowest home attendance: 43,673 vs Barnet (26 October 2005)
- Average home league attendance: 68,765
Home colours	Away colours	Third colours

The 2005–06 season was Manchester United's 14th season in the Premier League, and their 31st consecutive season in the top division of English football.

After having finished in third place in both of the previous two seasons, the Red Devils improved slightly to finish the 2005–06 season in second place, despite finishing 8 points off the lead.

However, despite the improvement in their league form, United's European form took a massive blow, with the club failing to reach the knockout stage of the UEFA Champions League for the first time since 1994–95. The club fared better in the FA Cup, reaching the Fifth Round, but their real success came in the League Cup, in which they beat Wigan Athletic 4–0 in the final. United became the first club in Premier League history to score 1,000 goals, a milestone reached on 29 October in the 4–1 defeat to Middlesbrough at the Riverside, with Cristiano Ronaldo scoring the goal.

The 2005–06 season also saw the departure of club captain Roy Keane, who had been at Old Trafford since 1993. Keane played his last game for the club on 18 September 2005 in a goalless draw with Liverpool, but was forced to withdraw from the match only a couple of minutes before full-time. It was later revealed that Keane had picked up a foot injury and he eventually left the club for his boyhood team Celtic on 18 November 2005. Keane was subsequently replaced as captain by his deputy, Gary Neville. On 25 November 2005, just seven days after Keane left the club, United fans were plunged into mourning by the death of legendary former player George Best, who died at age 59.

== Pre-season and friendlies ==
Manchester United began their pre-season in July 2005 with a 5–1 thrashing away to Clyde. The only goal of the first half was scored by United's Kléberson. In the second half, United fielded a completely different side. Paul Scholes opened the scoring in the second half, before Ruud van Nistelrooy added on United's third with a penalty. Neil McGregor pulled a goal back for Clyde when he struck home Steven Masterton's corner, but Liam Miller restored the three-goal margin after taking a short pass from Van Nistelrooy, and Van Nistelrooy finished the scoring in the 85th minute.

United then travelled down to England to face Peterborough United for Barry Fry's testimonial. The Posh held United to a 0–0 draw in the first half, but a Ruud van Nistelrooy hat-trick, a Cristiano Ronaldo brace, and a Giuseppe Rossi strike saw United win 6–0.

United then set out to East Asia for their 2005–06 pre-season tour. They started their tour of East Asia with a 2–0 win over a Hong Kong XI side, with the goals coming from Giuseppe Rossi and Dong Fangzhuo (his first goal for Manchester United). This was followed up with a 3–0 win over Beijing Hyundai, with Paul Scholes scoring a brace and Park Ji-Sung scoring his first goal for the Red Devils. United then travelled to Japan to face Kashima Antlers, a game in which they lost 2–1. Masashi Motoyama opened the scoring when he controlled a cross-field pass with his first touch and with his second lashed a superb volley over 'keeper Tim Howard into the far corner. United responded when Louis Saha threaded a pass to Cristiano Ronaldo who darted into the area before rolling the ball across the face of goal for Ryan Giggs to tap in. However, before half-time, Antlers restored their lead when Mitsuo Ogasawara's canny flicked pass gave Motoyama the space to fire in a powerful angled volley from eight yards.

United's pre-season tour of East Asia ended with a 2–0 victory over Urawa Red Diamonds. Wayne Rooney scored both goals, which were his first of United's Far East tour. Rooney got first after just five minutes when he threaded a low shot under Ryota Tsuzuki. Rooney's second was scored soon after when he dribbled past three players before lofting a delicate chip over Tsuzuki from the edge of the area.

Following their return to Europe, Manchester United rounded off their pre-season schedule with a 6–1 drubbing of their feeder club in Belgium, Royal Antwerp. Ruud van Nistelrooy grabbed a hat-trick, with United's other goals being scored by Paul Scholes, Cristiano Ronaldo, and Darren Fletcher.

United played one more friendly during the 2005–06 season, the final one being a home fixture against Celtic on 9 May. The game was played as a testimonial for former United captain Roy Keane, who left United as captain in November 2005. Keane played the first half in a Celtic shirt, and switched sides at half-time to play as his former role of United captain. United won 1–0, thanks to Cristiano Ronaldo's 55th-minute goal.

Date	Opponents	H / A	Result F–A	Scorers	Attendance
16 July 2005	Clyde	A	5–1	Kléberson 30', Scholes 48', Van Nistelrooy (2) 58' (pen.), 85', Miller 78'	8,000
20 July 2005	Peterborough United	A	6–0	Van Nistelrooy (3) 54', 77', 84', Ronaldo 69', 90', Rossi 81'	15,460
23 July 2005	Hong Kong XI	A	2–0	Rossi 69', Dong 73'	33,971
26 July 2005	Beijing Hyundai	A	3–0	Scholes (2) 40', 43', Park 48'	24,224
28 July 2005	Kashima Antlers	N	1–2	Giggs 7'	33,971
30 July 2005	Urawa Red Diamonds	A	2–0	Rooney (2) 50', 65'	58,389
3 August 2005	Royal Antwerp	A	6–1	Van Nistelrooy (3) 12', 27' (pen.), 45', Scholes 15', Ronaldo 32', Fletcher 60'	12,000
9 May 2006	Celtic	H	1–0	Ronaldo 55'	69,591

== FA Premier League ==
Manchester United started their Premier League season with a 2–0 win over Everton at Goodison Park. Ruud van Nistelrooy went close twice as the visitors dominated for long spells before the Dutch striker slotted in John O'Shea's cross two minutes before the interval. Wayne Rooney doubled United's lead 27 seconds in the second half after Joseph Yobo had ludicrously rolled the ball across the penalty area into his path. Marcus Bent's deflected volley struck the bar but Everton were disappointing. The hosts continued with the five-man midfield which served them so well in the 2004–05 season, though James Beattie only lasted 20 minutes before injury forced him off and Bent on.

United's next game in the FA Premier League was a home game against Aston Villa. Thomas Sørensen made a brilliant save to deflect a shot from Park Ji-Sung against the crossbar, while a Wayne Rooney volley was cleared off the line. Park missed a good chance after exchanging passes with Rooney before Sørensen saved headers from both Gabriel Heinze and Cristiano Ronaldo. Van Nistelrooy eventually scored the only goal of the game when he tapped home from Ronaldo's cross.

United continued their perfect start to the season with 2–0 away win at Newcastle United. Wayne Rooney opened the scoring in the 66th minute after pouncing on Jean-Alain Boumsong's error. Albert Luque thought that he had scored on his Newcastle debut, but his goal was ruled out for offside. Ruud van Nistelrooy glanced a header wide and had a penalty appeal turned down before sealing the victory with a low shot in injury time.

United's 100% all-win start to the season ended as they were held to a 1–1 home draw by their crosstown rivals Manchester City. Ruud van Nistelrooy gave United the lead in first-half injury time, turning home from close range after David James had saved his first effort brilliantly. United failed to take advantage of their supremacy, with van Nistelrooy and Park Ji-sung missing chances, and Joey Barton struck after 75 minutes, turning home Darius Vassell's effort.

Despite a second successive draw, this time away to Liverpool, United went up to third place in the FA Premier League table. Steven Gerrard saw a long free-kick bounce just wide in the first half, while Ruud van Nistelrooy went close for United with a chip over the bar. Liverpool continued to push after the break, with Gerrard heading over and Edwin van der Sar saving his drive, but United held firm.

After losing their all-win 100% start to the season, United's unbeaten record went too, with a shock 2–1 home loss to Blackburn Rovers. Morten Gamst Pedersen gave Blackburn a first-half lead as his free-kick drifted straight into the net. Ruud van Nistelrooy levelled for United when Wayne Rooney's shot proved too hot for Blackburn keeper Brad Friedel, but an error by Paul Scholes gifted the ball to Michael Gray, who set up Pedersen to slam home the winner.

United returned to winning ways with a 3–2 win over Fulham at Craven Cottage on 1 October 2005. Collins John put Fulham ahead, but Ruud van Nistelrooy equalised from the spot after Moritz Volz fouled Park Ji-Sung. Park then released Wayne Rooney to put United ahead after 18 minutes, only for Claus Jensen to level from a free-kick. van Nistelrooy completed the scoring in first-half injury time, sweeping home unmarked from another Park pass.

United's next game was an away game to Sunderland on 15 October. The Red Devils, wearing their blue away kit, won 3–1, pushing the Black Cats back into the relegation zone. A blistering break culminated in Wayne Rooney eluding Kelvin Davis and sliding the ball home for United's opener. Rooney played in Ruud van Nistelrooy for the Dutch striker to double the lead before a long-range strike from Stephen Elliott pulled a goal back. Anthony Le Tallec then went close to equalising before Giuseppe Rossi scored his first, and what turned out to be his only, league goal for Manchester United from 20 yards.

United dropped from 3rd to 5th in the FA Premier League table with a 1–1 home draw against Tottenham Hotspur on 22 October. Spurs were trailing 1–0 when Jermaine Jenas curled home a stunning free kick after Rio Ferdinand had fouled Jermain Defoe. That saved the blushes of England goalkeeper Paul Robinson, who had spilled Ruud van Nistelrooy's header to allow Mikaël Silvestre to touch home. Alan Smith, Cristiano Ronaldo and van Nistelrooy came close for United, but Spurs deserved their point. Spurs had three penalty appeals turned down in the match, two of which were decent shouts.

A 4–1 away loss to Middlesbrough pushed United down a further two places in the table. Edwin van der Sar gifted Middlesbrough the lead when he let Gaizka Mendieta's shot slip through his fingers. A mistake by Rio Ferdinand let in Jimmy Floyd Hasselbaink for the second, and Yakubu made it 3–0 from the spot after Stuart Parnaby was fouled. Yakubu set up Mendieta to make it 4–0. Cristiano Ronaldo headed home a consolation goal deep in injury time for the Reds - United's 1000th goal in the FA Premier League - but by then the home fans had long been celebrating a famous victory.

After the disastrous 4–1 loss to Middlesbrough, United opened November with a 1–0 victory over Chelsea, ending the defending champions' 40-match unbeaten run in the FA Premier League. Darren Fletcher scored the only goal of the game just over half an hour into the match with a header. The Scotsman appeared to be trying to head the ball back across the goal, but his effort looped inside the far post. Early in the second half, Ruud van Nistelrooy should have made the game safe, but he blazed his shot over. His miss meant United had to live on their nerves as Chelsea desperately sought the equaliser and Edwin van der Sar bravely denied Frank Lampard.

After the win against Chelsea, United won their next three FA Premier League games, with 3–1 and 2–1 away wins over Charlton Athletic and West Ham United and a 3–0 home victory over Portsmouth. Their winning streak was finally halted by Everton, who held United to a 1–1 draw at Old Trafford. Both goals were scored in the opening 15 minutes: James McFadden opened the scoring for Everton with just seven minutes played, with the Scottish forward beating Edwin van der Sar from a tight angle for the opening goal. Ryan Giggs guided the ball past Richard Wright to equalise after collecting a superb pass from Paul Scholes. Wright later saved from Alan Smith, Wayne Rooney, Gary Neville, Scholes and Giggs, and van der Sar denied McFadden as Everton hit back on the break.

Following the draw against Everton (which pushed United from 2nd to 3rd place in the league table), a 4–0 win over Wigan Athletic put United back to second in the FA Premier League. Rio Ferdinand headed his first ever goal for the club on the half-hour from Ryan Giggs' accurate corner. Wayne Rooney doubled United's lead with a low shot, then hit the bar before making it 3–0 with a chip over Wigan's ex-United 'keeper Mike Pollitt. Ruud van Nistelrooy converted from the penalty spot in the 70th minute to send Wigan crashing to their fifth successive league defeat.

Manchester United moved within six points of Premier League toppers Chelsea with a 2–0 victory over Aston Villa on 17 December. Ruud van Nistelrooy's close-range finish put United ahead after nine minutes from Darren Fletcher's pass. Wayne Rooney doubled United's lead five minutes after the interval following good work by Park Ji-Sung. Villa's only serious threat to United's supremacy was a shot from Milan Baroš that struck the bar.

After their 2–0 victory over Aston Villa, United next opponents were also from the West Midlands, this time the opponents being West Bromwich Albion. The game was played on Boxing Day, and the Red Devils cruised past the lifeless Baggies in a 3–0 victory that cemented United as the second-placed team in the FA Premier League. Paul Scholes set the ball rolling with a strike from the edge of the box after a good run from Rio Ferdinand. Ferdinand turned scorer in first-half injury time when he planted a firm header in from Ryan Giggs' corner. The victory was completed when Ruud van Nistelrooy headed home a cross from substitute Alan Smith midway through the second half.

United's away game with Birmingham City was their third successive game against West Midlands opposition. The game ended as a 2–2 draw. Ruud van Nistelrooy's early strike from close range put United in front, but Jamie Clapham equalised with a smart left-foot finish. Wayne Rooney slid the ball home to restore United's lead on 54 minutes, but substitute Walter Pandiani converted Damien Johnson's cross on 78 minutes to earn Birmingham a share of the points.

United ended 2005 with a 4–1 home win over Bolton Wanderers on New Year's Eve. The game was played on the 64th birthday of United manager Alex Ferguson, and Ferguson enjoyed a stress-free birthday as United brushed aside the Trotters. Ferguson's side were awarded with a blistering start when Bruno Ngotty put Kieran Richardson's cross into his own net. Bolton equalised through a Gary Speed header, but United restored their lead after Louis Saha slotted in at half-time, and the outstanding Wayne Rooney set up Cristiano Ronaldo to tap home to make it 3–1 and double United's lead. The Portuguese winger wrapped up the win after a mazy run. Rooney received a standing ovation after yet another outstanding display, which meant the rested Ruud van Nistelrooy was hardly missed.

United kicked off 2006 in slow fashion with a 0–0 draw away to Arsenal. United defenders Rio Ferdinand and Wes Brown made superb blocks to deny efforts from Thierry Henry and Gilberto Silva. Cristiano Ronaldo should have given United the lead just before the break, but he was guilty of a hurried finish. Arsenal appealed for a penalty after a Gary Neville tackle on Cesc Fàbregas, while Brown had a header cleared off the line after a late corner. As the game wore on, Ruud van Nistelrooy came to the fore, but even the Dutchman was unable to break the impasse. The draw left United trailing Chelsea by 13 points, while Arsenal trailed the Premier League leaders by a staggering 24 points.

Manchester United played their local rivals Manchester City on 14 January 2006. United lost 3–1, putting a huge dent into their slim title hopes. Trevor Sinclair put City ahead with a neat turn and shot after Joey Barton's cross was not properly cleared, and a cool Darius Vassell finish made it 2–0. United responded well but City's cause was helped when Cristiano Ronaldo was sent off for a wild lunge at former Red Andy Cole. Ruud van Nistelrooy pulled a goal back, but Robbie Fowler's clinical late strike wrapped up victory for City.

United recorded their first win of 2006 with a 1–0 victory over their rivals, Liverpool. The game was decided by a Rio Ferdinand header in the final minute. Ferdinand leapt highest in a crowded penalty area to power a header past Pepe Reina from a Ryan Giggs free-kick. Liverpool will have regrets, given their dominance of the game, with Djibril Cissé missing an open goal just past the hour when he lashed over. In the first half, Peter Crouch's powerful shot was well-blocked by Wes Brown, who threw himself at the ball.

However, United then lost 4–3 away to Blackburn Rovers in their next game. David Bentley struck after Edwin van der Sar parried Morten Gamst Pedersen's free-kick before Louis Saha equalised with a shot across goal. A mix-up between Rio Ferdinand and Van der Sar saw Bentley strike again before Lucas Neill converted a penalty. Bentley drilled home a half-volley before Ruud van Nistelrooy struck twice in five minutes and Ferdinand was given a red card.

United recovered from the loss against Blackburn to win 4–2 at home against Fulham. A deflected shot from Park Ji-Sung and a free-kick from Cristiano Ronaldo put United 2–0 up inside 13 minutes. Brian McBride pulled a goal back for Fulham with a fine header eight minutes later, but Louis Saha added a third goal for United in controversial fashion - Ruud van Nistelrooy was offside in the build-up. Despite Heiðar Helguson's header giving Fulham some hope, Ronaldo's late strike sealed victory.

United's next game was played away to Portsmouth at Fratton Park. United were 3–0 up at the interval, Ruud van Nistelrooy heading in the first after Ryan Giggs hit the bar. Cristiano Ronaldo then scored twice in seven minutes, first unleashing an unstoppable shot past Dean Kiely and then firing home with a low strike. Late on, Matthew Taylor cleverly headed in Wayne Routledge's diagonal shot, while a Ronaldo free-kick hit the bar.

United played their next game away to Wigan Athletic. Wigan opened the scoring after an hour through Paul Scharner's tap-in. United equalised when shock substitute Ruud van Nistelrooy's mis-hit shot set up teammate Cristiano Ronaldo. Then at the death, Louis Saha's deflected shot hit the bar and ricocheted into the net off Pascal Chimbonda.

United's next game was a home game against Newcastle United. Wayne Rooney scored a brace as United won 2–0. Rooney's first goal came when he intercepted Peter Ramage's backpass to delicately chip over a helpless Shay Given in the eighth minute. Four minutes later, he held off Ramage to slot home from John O'Shea's pass. Newcastle improved in the second half but Rooney missed a great chance for his hat-trick, hitting the post after rounding keeper Given.

United travelled to The Hawthorns to face West Bromwich Albion in their next game. United won 2–1 to tighten their grip on second place in the league. Louis Saha scored both goals for United. The Frenchman got his first goal when he capitalised on slack marking by West Brom to head past Tomasz Kuszczak. Saha's next goal came midway through the second half, when Kuszczak was powerless to stop Saha's clipped finish after a flowing United move. Edwin van der Sar made two great saves in the first half but the Dutchman was finally beaten with 12 minutes to go when Nathan Ellington headed in. Saha could have a hat-trick when, after another United counter-attack, he had a close-range shot blocked.

United won 3–0 at home against Birmingham City in their next game, played on 26 March. The deadlock was broken after just 3 minutes played when Birmingham keeper Maik Taylor was only able to help Ryan Giggs' free-kick over the line. Giggs then latched onto a through ball from Wayne Rooney to tuck in a second after 15 minutes. Rooney sealed the win, racing through to score with eight minutes left.

After a 1–0 win against West Ham, United's next game was an away game against Bolton Wanderers. Kevin Davies put Bolton ahead after racing through in the 26th minute, but Louis Saha equalised seven minutes later, curling the ball past Jussi Jääskeläinen from a tight angle. Ruud van Nistelrooy scored the winner and his 150th goal for United in the 79th minute, when he tucked home from close range after a late cross from Saha.

Manchester United's next game in the FA Premier League was a home game against Arsenal; United won the match 2–0. Wayne Rooney opened the scoring when he controlled Mikaël Silvestre's brilliant cross before shooting past Jens Lehmann, and later crossed for Park Ji-Sung to score from close range. Lehmann had superbly saved from Rooney twice before his goal, while Kolo Touré appeared to divert a strike from the forward on to the post with his hand. United keeper Edwin van der Sar made good saves from compatriot Robin van Persie. This was United's ninth successive win in the FA Premier League.

This winning streak was ended after a 0–0 draw against Sunderland, a result which dealt United's title hopes a crushing blow. Needing a win to hold off relegation, Sunderland wasted first-half chances through Liam Lawrence and Jon Stead. United improved after the break, but Kelvin Davis was in inspired form. The Sunderland keeper made magnificent saves from Cristiano Ronaldo and Ruud van Nistelrooy to leave the hosts six points adrift of leaders Chelsea.

For their next game, United travelled to face Tottenham Hotspur at White Hart Lane. United won 2–1, with Wayne Rooney's first-half brace keeping the FA Premier League title race alive for at least another week. The England striker opened the scoring after seven minutes when he slid in to convert Cristiano Ronaldo's pass. When Lee Young-Pyo dawdled in defence, fellow Korean Park Ji-Sung pounced to play Rooney in for his decisive second. Spurs, who had chances with Jermain Defoe and Michael Dawson going close, pulled one back through Jermaine Jenas. The midfielder pounced on 53 minutes after some woeful Manchester United defending at a corner. Nemanja Vidić's clearing header bounced off Rio Ferdinand and back towards goal to leave Jenas with the easiest of tap-ins.

United's hopes of winning a first FA Premier League title since 2003 were ended after a 3–0 defeat to Chelsea at Stamford Bridge, with the Blues winning a second successive title thanks to their victory over the Red Devils. José Mourinho's side needed only a point to put the seal on another title triumph, and William Gallas set them on their way with a fifth-minute header. Joe Cole added a brilliant individual goal on the hour and Ricardo Carvalho fired home Chelsea's third. The mood of celebration was dampened as Wayne Rooney was stretchered off late on.

With the hopes of winning the FA Premier League having gone after the 3–0 loss to Chelsea, United drew their penultimate FA Premier League game of the 2005–06 season 0–0 with Middlesbrough. Ruud van Nistelrooy's penalty miss proved costly for the Reds, who were fighting for second place with Liverpool. Van Nistelrooy stepped up after Lee Cattermole's handball, but Brad Jones brilliantly saved his spot-kick. Otherwise, United were short of ideas in front of goal and clearly missed the injured Wayne Rooney. The draw pushed United a point clear of Liverpool in the race for second place in the Premier League, with one game left.

United sealed second place in the 2005–06 Premier League with a 4–0 win over Charlton Athletic, thus avoiding the qualification rounds of the 2006–07 UEFA Champions League. Louis Saha opened the account by heading home Ryan Giggs' corner before Cristiano Ronaldo tapped home from close range to give United a 2–0 lead. An own goal from Jason Euell meant Alan Curbishley's last match as Charlton boss would turn into a rout. Kieran Richardson added United's fourth with a superb long-range strike.

Date	Opponents	H / A	Result F–A	Scorers	Attendance	League position
13 August 2005	Everton	A	2–0	Van Nistelrooy 43', Rooney 46'	38,610	4th
20 August 2005	Aston Villa	H	1–0	Van Nistelrooy 66'	67,934	4th
28 August 2005	Newcastle United	A	2–0	Rooney 66', Van Nistelrooy 90'	52,327	4th
10 September 2005	Manchester City	H	1–1	Van Nistelrooy 45'	67,839	4th
18 September 2005	Liverpool	A	0–0		44,917	3rd
24 September 2005	Blackburn Rovers	H	1–2	Van Nistelrooy 67'	67,765	6th
1 October 2005	Fulham	A	3–2	Van Nistelrooy (2) 16' (pen.), 44', Rooney 17'	21,862	4th
15 October 2005	Sunderland	A	3–1	Rooney 40', Van Nistelrooy 76', Rossi 87'	39,085	3rd
22 October 2005	Tottenham Hotspur	H	1–1	Silvestre 7'	67,856	5th
29 October 2005	Middlesbrough	A	1–4	Ronaldo 90'	30,579	7th
6 November 2005	Chelsea	H	1–0	Fletcher 31'	67,864	4th
19 November 2005	Charlton Athletic	A	3–1	Smith 37', Van Nistelrooy (2) 70', 85'	26,730	3rd
27 November 2005	West Ham United	A	2–1	Rooney 47', O'Shea 56'	34,755	2nd
3 December 2005	Portsmouth	H	3–0	Scholes 20', Rooney 80', Van Nistelrooy 84'	67,684	2nd
11 December 2005	Everton	H	1–1	Giggs 15'	67,831	3rd
14 December 2005	Wigan Athletic	H	4–0	Ferdinand 30', Rooney (2) 35', 55', Van Nistelrooy 70' (pen.)	67,793	2nd
17 December 2005	Aston Villa	A	2–0	Van Nistelrooy 10', Rooney 51'	37,128	2nd
26 December 2005	West Bromwich Albion	H	3–0	Scholes 35', Ferdinand 45', Van Nistelrooy 63'	67,972	2nd
28 December 2005	Birmingham City	A	2–2	Van Nistelrooy 4', Rooney 53'	28,459	2nd
31 December 2005	Bolton Wanderers	H	4–1	Ngotty 8' (o.g.), Saha 44', Ronaldo (2) 68', 90'	67,858	2nd
3 January 2006	Arsenal	A	0–0		38,313	2nd
14 January 2006	Manchester City	A	1–3	Van Nistelrooy 76'	47,192	2nd
22 January 2006	Liverpool	H	1–0	Ferdinand 90'	67,874	2nd
1 February 2006	Blackburn Rovers	A	3–4	Saha 37', Van Nistelrooy (2) 63', 65'	25,484	2nd
4 February 2006	Fulham	H	4–2	Bocanegra 6' (o.g.), Ronaldo (2) 14', 86', Saha 23'	67,844	2nd
11 February 2006	Portsmouth	A	3–1	Van Nistelrooy 18', Ronaldo (2) 38', 45'	20,206	2nd
6 March 2006	Wigan Athletic	A	2–1	Ronaldo 74', Chimbonda 90' (o.g.)	23,524	2nd
12 March 2006	Newcastle United	H	2–0	Rooney (2) 8', 12'	67,858	2nd
18 March 2006	West Bromwich Albion	A	2–1	Saha (2) 16', 64'	27,623	2nd
26 March 2006	Birmingham City	H	3–0	Giggs (2) 3', 15', Rooney 83'	69,070	2nd
29 March 2006	West Ham United	H	1–0	Van Nistelrooy 45'	69,522	2nd
1 April 2006	Bolton Wanderers	A	2–1	Saha 33', Van Nistelrooy 79'	27,718	2nd
9 April 2006	Arsenal	H	2–0	Rooney 54', Park 78'	70,908	2nd
14 April 2006	Sunderland	H	0–0		72,519	2nd
17 April 2006	Tottenham Hotspur	A	2–1	Rooney (2) 8', 36'	36,141	2nd
29 April 2006	Chelsea	A	0–3		42,219	2nd
1 May 2006	Middlesbrough	H	0–0		69,531	2nd
7 May 2006	Charlton Athletic	H	4–0	Saha 19', Ronaldo 23', Euell 34' (o.g.), Richardson 58'	73,006	2nd

Pos	Team	Pld	W	D	L	GF	GA	GD	Pts	Qualification or relegation
1	Chelsea (C)	38	29	4	5	72	22	+50	91	Qualification for the Champions League group stage
2	Manchester United	38	25	8	5	72	34	+38	83	Qualification for the Champions League group stage
3	Liverpool	38	25	7	6	57	25	+32	82	Qualification for the Champions League third qualifying round
4	Arsenal	38	20	7	11	68	31	+37	67	Qualification for the Champions League third qualifying round
5	Tottenham Hotspur	38	18	11	9	53	38	+15	65	Qualification for the UEFA Cup first round (Note: Since Manchester United qualified for the Champions League, their place in the UEFA Cup as League Cup winners passed down to the league and was awarded to Blackburn Rovers as the highest-placed team not already qualified for European competitions.)

Source: Barclays Premier League
Rules for classification: 1) points; 2) goal difference; 3) number of goals scored.
(C) Champions

== FA Cup ==
The draw for the third round of the FA Cup took place on 4 December 2005, and Manchester United were given an away tie with Conference National side Burton Albion. The game, played on 8 January 2006, ended as a 0–0 draw, with Burton deservedly earning a replay through the draw. The Brewers were the better team in the first half, with Phil Bardsley clearing headers off the line from Jon Shaw and skipper Darren Stride. United struggled on a heavy pitch, although Wayne Rooney twice forced saves from Burton goalkeeper Saul Deeney after coming on as a substitute. And in injury time, Deeney dramatically saved Ritchie Jones' low strike. A late winner for United would have been cruel on Burton, who held firm in the second half as the Premier League side pressed forward.

In the replay, United won 5–0 to spare their blushes and end Burton's FA Cup dream. The result was never in doubt from the moment Louis Saha converted Kieran Richardson's cross after seven minutes. Giuseppe Rossi rose high to head home Mikaël Silvestre's cross on 22 minutes, and Richardson drove in powerfully to make it 3–0 shortly after the break. Substitute Ryan Giggs drove in the fourth and Rossi's deflected drive in injury time completed the victory.

The draw for the fourth round of the FA Cup took place on 9 January 2006, and United or Burton were given an away tie with Championship side Wolverhampton Wanderers. United won the replay 5–0, thus meaning that United will be facing Wolves.

United won the match, played on 29 January 2006, 3–0. Kieran Richardson gave United an early lead with a first-time shot after the Wolves central defence failed to deal with Louis Saha's low cross. Saha sprinted clear of Wolves' square back line to latch on to Nemanja Vidić's long pass for United's second. Richardson then rounded off a delightful move, heading home Ruud van Nistelrooy's cross.

The draw for the fifth round of the FA Cup took place on 30 January 2006, and Manchester United were given an away tie with fellow Premier League side Liverpool. The match was played on 18 February 2006, but United lost 1–0. Peter Crouch headed home Steve Finnan's cross after 19 minutes to give Rafael Benítez's side a deserved place in the quarter-finals. Edwin van der Sar had saved brilliantly from Harry Kewell seconds earlier as Liverpool dominated a poor United side. United's misery was compounded as substitute Alan Smith suffered a broken leg blocking a free-kick late on.

Date	Round	Opponents	H / A	Result F–A	Scorers	Attendance
8 January 2006	Round 3	Burton Albion	A	0–0		6,191
18 January 2006	Round 3 Replay	Burton Albion	H	5–0	Saha 7', Rossi 23', 90', Richardson 52', Giggs 68'	53,654
29 January 2006	Round 4	Wolverhampton Wanderers	A	3–0	Richardson (2) 6', 52', Saha 45'	28,333
18 February 2006	Round 5	Liverpool	A	0–1		44,039

== League Cup ==
The draw for the third round of the League Cup took place on 24 September 2005, and Manchester United were given a home tie with Football League Two side Barnet.

The match was played on 26 October 2005, and United won 4–1. United took the lead four minutes in when Barnet's goalie Ross Flitney had been sent off for handball outside the area two minutes earlier. Forward Louis Soares was sacrificed without even kicking the ball for substitute keeper Scott Tynan, who conceded when Liam Miller tucked in the resulting free kick immediately. Kieran Richardson added a second on 19 minutes but Barnet then resisted until 51 minutes when Giuseppe Rossi struck. Dean Sinclair got one back for Barnet, scoring from 12 yards, but United added a fourth through Sylvan Ebanks-Blake.

The draw for the fourth round of the Football League Cup took place on 29 October 2005, and United were given a home tie with fellow Premier League side West Bromwich Albion. The match was played on 30 November.

United won 3–1. Before the match, a minute's silence was held, in tribute to United legend George Best, who had died five days earlier at the age of 59. After an emotional pre-match build-up, two quick goals from Cristiano Ronaldo and Louis Saha set up an easy win. Ronaldo scored from the spot in the 12th minute after he was fouled by Diomansy Kamara, and Giuseppe Rossi set up Saha four minutes later. John O'Shea added a fine third after 56 minutes before Nathan Ellington pulled a goal back for West Brom late on.

The draw for the fifth round of the League Cup took place on 3 December 2005, and Manchester United were given an away fixture with fellow Premier League side Birmingham City. The match was played on 20 December, and United won 3–1, through a Louis Saha brace and a Park Ji-Sung goal. With just seconds into the second half, Saha opened the scoring with his first goal of the match, simply tapping in Cristiano Ronaldo's cross. United extended their lead in the 50th minute when Park lashed the ball into the net with a powerful shot. Saha claimed his second goal - the best of United's three strikes - when he guided a shot past Maik Taylor, before Jiří Jarošík headed in for the Blues.

The draw for the semi-finals of the League Cup took place in December 2005, following the conclusion of the quarter-finals. United were paired with fellow Premier League side Blackburn Rovers. The first leg took place on 11 January 2006 at Ewood Park, while the return leg took place at Old Trafford on 25 January 2006.

United took the lead in the first leg almost half an hour into the match, when Louis Saha latched onto Ryan Giggs' pass to powerfully beat Brad Friedel. But Morten Gamst Pedersen's rising drive five minutes later put Blackburn level. United dominated possession in the second half, but resilient Blackburn held on to leave honours even for the second leg at Old Trafford.

United took the lead in the return leg at Old Trafford just eight minutes in when Ruud van Nistelrooy fired in a shot before Steven Reid equalised when he lashed home as both players pounced on defensive mistakes. Zurab Khizanishvili was punished for handball to Blackburn's fury but Brad Friedel saved van Nistelrooy's penalty. A half-time tunnel fracas marred the tie before Louis Saha spooned in a volley for United's winner that sent them through to the League Cup Final.

The League Cup final was played at the Millennium Stadium on 26 February 2006. United opponents in the final were shock finalists Wigan Athletic, who had just been promoted to the Premier League at the start of the season and beat Arsenal on away goals.

United, who were clear favourites in the match, won 4–0 to claim what was eventually their only piece of silverware in the 2005–06 season. Wayne Rooney cashed in on confusion between Arjan De Zeeuw and Pascal Chimbonda to fire United ahead. Gary Neville crossed for Louis Saha to score United's second before Stéphane Henchoz gifted the ball to Saha to set Cristiano Ronaldo up for their third. Rooney rounded off a blitz of three goals in seven minutes to ensure United ended the season with a trophy.

Date	Round	Opponents	H / A	Result F–A	Scorers	Attendance
26 October 2005	Round 3	Barnet	H	4–1	Miller 4', Richardson 19', Rossi 51', Ebanks-Blake 89'	43,673
30 November 2005	Round 4	West Bromwich Albion	H	3–1	Ronaldo 12' (pen.), Saha 16', O'Shea 56'	48,294
20 December 2005	Round 5	Birmingham City	A	3–1	Saha (2) 46', 63', Park 50'	20,454
11 January 2006	Semi-final; First leg	Blackburn Rovers	A	1–1	Saha 30'	24,348
25 January 2006	Semi-final; Second leg	Blackburn Rovers	H	2–1	Van Nistelrooy 8', Saha 51'	61,637
26 February 2006	Final	Wigan Athletic	N	4–0	Rooney (2) 33', 61', Saha 55', Ronaldo 59'	66,866

== UEFA Champions League ==
=== Third qualifying round ===
As a result of finishing third in the 2004–05 FA Premier League, Manchester United entered the Champions League in the third qualifying round, where they were paired with Hungarian champions Debrecen.

The first leg was played on 9 August 2005 at Old Trafford, and United won 3–0. Wayne Rooney fired home a shot on the seven minutes to give United the lead, and then set up second-half goals for Ruud van Nistelrooy and Cristiano Ronaldo, who both finished in style.

For the return leg in Budapest, Hungary, United won 3–0, sending them through to the group stage 6–0 on aggregate. Gabriel Heinze's header settled United down after Gary Neville was stretchered off and Debrecen's Zsombor Kerekes and Tamás Sándor had missed good chances. Heinze scored another header and substitute Kieran Richardson made it 3–0 with a powerful 20-yard strike. Richardson limped off with 20 minutes left and United, who had used all their substitutes, finished with 10 men.

Date	Round	Opponents	H / A	Result F–A	Scorers	Attendance
9 August 2005	Third qualifying round First leg	Debrecen	H	3–0	Rooney 7', Van Nistelrooy 49', Ronaldo 63'	51,701
24 August 2005	Third qualifying round Second leg	Debrecen	A	3–0	Heinze (2) 20', 61', Richardson 65'	27,000

=== Group stage ===
The draw for the Champions League group stage took place on 25 August 2005 in Monaco. As one of the top eight ranked teams in Europe, Manchester United would avoid being drawn with Real Madrid, Milan, Internazionale, Barcelona, two English teams, Arsenal and Chelsea (who were in Pot 2, but would avoid being drawn with United due to the "country protection rule"), and others. However, they could still be drawn with Porto, Villarreal, Liverpool (who were in Pot 1, but regulations due to their qualification of the UEFA Champions League since they finished fifth in the Premier League and were defending Champions of the competition meant that they could meet any English team at any point), and others. Eventually, United were drawn in Group D, alongside Villarreal, Benfica and Lille.

United's UEFA Champions League campaign began in slow fashion with a 0–0 away draw with Villarreal on 14 September. Wayne Rooney was sent off in the 63rd minute by referee Kim Milton Nielsen for ironically applauding the official after being shown a yellow card. United came closest to scoring when Gonzalo Rodríguez cleared off the line from Ruud van Nistelrooy, while Edwin van der Sar had to make a save to keep out Rodolfo Arruabarrena.

United's next UEFA Champions League match was a home game against Benfica. Ryan Giggs opened the scoring in the 38th minute with a free-kick that deflected off Simão. Simão levelled with another set-piece after the break, but Ruud van Nistelrooy turned home from close range with six minutes to go after Rio Ferdinand headed on Giggs' corner.

United played at home to Lille in their next match. United finished the game with 10 men after Paul Scholes was sent off for two bookable offences, the second a wild challenge on Jean Makoun after 63 minutes. Scholes' plight summed up a bitterly disappointing performance by Sir Alex Ferguson's side, who rarely threatened a well-organised Lille side. Ryan Giggs hit a post with a first-half free-kick, while Scholes' volley was well saved by keeper Tony Sylva.

For their second game against Lille, Manchester United travelled to France to face Les Dogues on 2 November 2005. United lost 1–0, leaving their hopes of reaching the knockout stage in balance. Former Spurs star Milenko Ačimovič scored from close range after 37 minutes as United failed to respond to their thrashing at Middlesbrough. Cristiano Ronaldo came closest for United with a second-half header that hit the bar, while substitute Park Ji-sung also wasted a great chance. But Lille survived in comfort to leave United lying third in Group D.

Manchester United's next game was against Villarreal at Old Trafford. United drew 0–0, just as they did in Spain, which left their hopes of qualifying for the UEFA Champions League knockout stage still on balance. United needed to beat Benfica in Lisbon to ensure qualification, although a draw would have sufficed if Villarreal beat Lille in their final game in Spain (which they did). Wayne Rooney was the shining star of a subdued United display. He was denied by goalkeeper Mariano Barbosa in the second minute then shot narrowly over the top late on.

United crashed out of the Champions League with a 2–1 loss to Benfica on 7 December. Paul Scholes gave United the perfect start in their quest to reach the knockout stage with a close-range finish after only six minutes. But Geovanni's diving header quickly put Benfica level and Beto fired in a second from 20 yards before half-time. It was the first time United had failed to qualify for the knockout stage of Europe's elite competition for 11 years.

Date	Opponents	H / A	Result F–A	Scorers	Attendance	Group position
14 September 2005	Villarreal	A	0–0		22,000	2nd
27 September 2005	Benfica	H	2–1	Giggs 39', Van Nistelrooy 85'	66,112	1st
18 October 2005	Lille	H	0–0		60,626	1st
2 November 2005	Lille	A	0–1		65,000	3rd
22 November 2005	Villarreal	H	0–0		67,471	3rd
7 December 2005	Benfica	A	1–2	Scholes 6'	61,000	4th

Pos	Team	Pld	W	D	L	GF	GA	GD	Pts	Qualification
1	(Spain) Villarreal	6	2	4	0	3	1	+2	10	Advance to knockout stage
2	(Portugal) Benfica	6	2	2	2	5	5	0	8	Advance to knockout stage
3	(France) Lille	6	1	3	2	1	2	−1	6	Transfer to UEFA Cup
4	(England) Manchester United	6	1	3	2	3	4	−1	6	

Source: RSSSF

== Squad statistics ==
No.	Pos.	Name	League		FA Cup		League Cup		Europe		Total	
No.	Pos.	Name	Apps	Goals	Apps	Goals	Apps	Goals	Apps	Goals	Apps	Goals
1	GK	(United States) Tim Howard	0(1)	0	2	0	3	0	0	0	5(1)	0
2	DF	(England) Gary Neville (vc)	24(1)	0	2(1)	0	5	0	3(1)	0	34(3)	0
3	DF	(France) Patrice Evra	7(4)	0	0(1)	0	1(1)	0	0	0	8(6)	0
4	DF	(Argentina) Gabriel Heinze	2(2)	0	0	0	0	0	2	2	4(2)	2
5	DF	(England) Rio Ferdinand	37	3	1(1)	0	4(1)	0	8	0	50(2)	3
6	DF	(England) Wes Brown	17(2)	0	4	0	5	0	3	0	29(2)	0
7	MF	(Portugal) Cristiano Ronaldo	24(9)	9	1(1)	0	4	2	8	1	37(10)	12
8	FW	(England) Wayne Rooney	34(2)	16	2(1)	0	3(1)	2	5	1	44(4)	19
9	FW	(France) Louis Saha	12(7)	7	3(1)	2	5	6	0(2)	0	20(10)	15
10	FW	(Netherlands) Ruud van Nistelrooy	28(7)	21	2	0	1(1)	1	8	2	39(8)	24
11	MF	(Wales) Ryan Giggs	22(5)	2	1(1)	1	3	0	4(1)	1	30(7)	4
13	MF	(South Korea) Park Ji-sung	23(11)	1	1(1)	0	3	1	0(6)	0	27(18)	2
14	FW	(England) Alan Smith	15(6)	1	0(2)	0	1(1)	0	7(1)	0	23(10)	1
15	DF	(Serbia and Montenegro) Nemanja Vidić	9(2)	0	2	0	0(2)	0	0	0	11(4)	0
16	MF	(Republic of Ireland) Roy Keane (c)	4(1)	0	0	0	0	0	1	0	5(1)	0
17	MF	(Republic of Ireland) Liam Miller	0(1)	0	0	0	1	1	0(1)	0	1(2)	1
18	MF	(England) Paul Scholes	18(2)	2	0	0	0	0	7	1	25(2)	3
19	GK	(Netherlands) Edwin van der Sar	38	0	2	0	3	0	8	0	51	0
20	FW	(Norway) Ole Gunnar Solskjær	0(3)	0	2	0	0	0	0	0	2(3)	0
22	DF	(Republic of Ireland) John O'Shea	34	1	2	0	3(1)	1	7	0	46(1)	2
23	MF	(England) Kieran Richardson	12(10)	1	4	3	4(1)	1	2(3)	1	22(14)	5
24	MF	(Scotland) Darren Fletcher	23(4)	1	2(1)	0	4	0	7	0	36(5)	1
25	MF	(South Africa) Quinton Fortune	0	0	0	0	0	0	0	0	0	0
26	DF	(England) Phil Bardsley	3(5)	0	2	0	1(1)	0	2(1)	0	8(7)	0
27	DF	(France) Mikaël Silvestre	30(3)	1	4	0	4(1)	0	6	0	44(4)	1
28	DF	(Spain) Gerard Piqué	1(2)	0	2	0	1(1)	0	0	0	4(3)	0
30	GK	(England) Luke Steele	0	0	0	0	0	0	0	0	0	0
40	FW	(England) Sylvan Ebanks-Blake	0	0	0	0	1	1	0	0	1	1
42	FW	(Italy) Giuseppe Rossi	1(4)	1	2	2	3	1	0(2)	0	6(6)	4
44	DF	(England) Adam Eckersley	0	0	0	0	1	0	0	0	1	0
46	MF	(England) Lee Martin	0	0	0	0	1	0	0	0	1	0
49	MF	(England) Ritchie Jones	0	0	1	0	1(2)	0	0	0	2(2)	0
50	MF	(Republic of Ireland) Darron Gibson	0	0	0	0	0(1)	0	0	0	0(1)	0

== Transfers ==
United's first departure of the 2005–06 season was Phil Neville, who signed for Everton for an undisclosed fee on 4 August. A week later, Brazilian midfielder José Kléberson signed for Turkish side Beşiktaş for £2.5 million. In mid-November, captain Roy Keane unexpectedly left United by mutual consent.

On 1 July, Dutch goalkeeper Edwin van der Sar signed from Fulham. A week later, Park Ji-sung signed from PSV. In the dying days of the summer window, Ben Foster arrived from Stoke City.

In mid-January, United released Finnish forward Jami Puustinen, English midfielder David Fox, and American forward Kenny Cooper. At the end of January, English forward Colin Heath was also released. South African midfielder Quinton Fortune departed United at the start of June.

Arriving during the winter transfer window were defenders Nemanja Vidić and Patrice Evra.

=== In ===
Date	Pos.	Name	From	Fee
1 July 2005	GK	(Netherlands) Edwin van der Sar	(England) Fulham	Undisclosed
8 July 2005	MF	(South Korea) Park Ji-sung	(Netherlands) PSV Eindhoven	£4m
19 September 2005	GK	(England) Ben Foster	(England) Stoke City	Undisclosed
5 January 2006	DF	(Serbia and Montenegro) Nemanja Vidić	(Russia) Spartak Moscow	Undisclosed
10 January 2006	DF	(France) Patrice Evra	(France) AS Monaco	Undisclosed

=== Out ===
Date	Pos.	Name	To	Fee
4 August 2005	DF	(England) Phil Neville	(England) Everton	Undisclosed
11 August 2005	MF	(Brazil) Kléberson	(Turkey) Beşiktaş	£2.5m
18 November 2005	MF	(Republic of Ireland) Roy Keane	Released	
17 January 2006	FW	(Finland) Jami Puustinen	(Finland) Honka	Free
18 January 2006	MF	(England) David Fox	(England) Blackpool	Free
19 January 2006	FW	(United States) Kenny Cooper	(United States) FC Dallas	Free
31 January 2006	FW	(England) Colin Heath	(England) Chesterfield	Free

=== Loan out ===
Date from	Date to	Position	Name	To
5 July 2005	14 May 2006	FW	(England) Eddie Johnson	(England) Crewe Alexandra
11 July 2005	11 May 2006	DF	(United States) Jonathan Spector	(England) Charlton Athletic
27 July 2005	31 December 2005	MF	(England) Chris Eagles	(England) Sheffield Wednesday
31 July 2005	21 May 2006	GK	(England) Ben Foster	(England) Watford
3 August 2005	1 January 2006	MF	(England) David Jones	(England) Preston North End
4 August 2005	14 May 2006	DF	(Republic of Ireland) Paul McShane	(England) Brighton & Hove Albion
17 August 2005	13 January 2006	FW	(France) David Bellion	(England) West Ham United
17 August 2005	28 May 2006	DF	(England) Phil Picken	(England) Chesterfield
18 August 2005	1 January 2006	FW	(England) Colin Heath	(England) Swindon Town
18 August 2005	1 January 2006	GK	(England) Tom Heaton	(England) Swindon Town
31 August 2005	31 December 2005	FW	(Denmark) Mads Timm	(Norway) Lyn
4 November 2005	14 May 2006	MF	(Republic of Ireland) Liam Miller	(England) Leeds United
1 January 2006	31 May 2006	MF	(England) Lee Martin	(Belgium) Royal Antwerp
6 January 2006	21 May 2006	MF	(England) Chris Eagles	(England) Watford
6 January 2006	31 May 2006	FW	(Denmark) Mads Timm	(England) Walsall
9 January 2006	31 May 2006	DF	(England) Adam Eckersley	(Belgium) Royal Antwerp
9 January 2006	31 May 2006	MF	(England) Ritchie Jones	(Belgium) Royal Antwerp
12 January 2006	31 May 2006	FW	(England) Sylvan Ebanks-Blake	(Belgium) Royal Antwerp
12 January 2006	31 May 2006	DF	(England) Danny Simpson	(Belgium) Royal Antwerp
12 January 2006	1 June 2006	MF	(England) David Jones	(Netherlands) NEC
13 January 2006	30 June 2006	FW	(France) David Bellion	(France) Nice
18 January 2006	20 April 2006	GK	(England) Tommy Lee	(England) Macclesfield Town
31 January 2006	31 May 2006	GK	(England) Tom Heaton	(Belgium) Royal Antwerp
16 April 2006	30 April 2006	DF	(England) Phil Bardsley	(England) Burnley
