= Asmir Begović =

Bosnian footballer (born 1987)

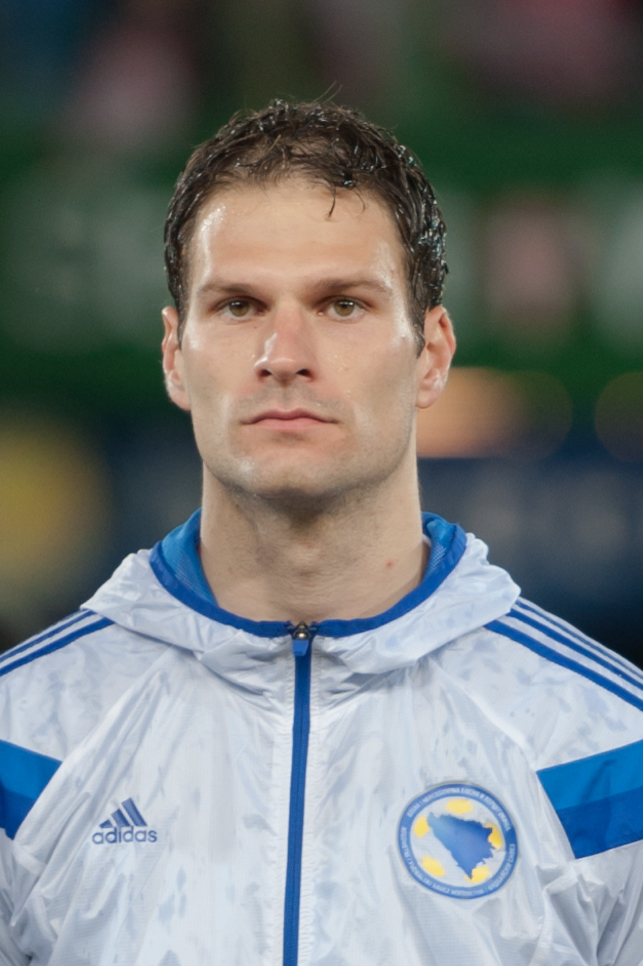
- Begović with Bosnia and Herzegovina in 2015

Personal information
- Full name: Asmir Begović
- Date of birth: 20 June 1987 (age 39)
- Place of birth: Trebinje, SR Bosnia and Herzegovina, Yugoslavia
- Height: 2.00 m (6 ft 7 in)
- Position: Goalkeeper

Youth career
- 1994–1997: FC Kirchhausen
- 1998–2003: Southwest Sting Edmonton
- 2003–2005: Portsmouth

Senior career*
Years	Team	Apps	(Gls)
2005–2010	Portsmouth	11	(0)
2005	→ La Louvière (loan)	2	(0)
2006	→ Macclesfield Town (loan)	3	(0)
2007	→ AFC Bournemouth (loan)	8	(0)
2008	→ Yeovil Town (loan)	2	(0)
2008	→ Yeovil Town (loan)	14	(0)
2009	→ Ipswich Town (loan)	6	(0)
2010–2015	Stoke City	160	(1)
2015–2017	Chelsea	19	(0)
2017–2021	AFC Bournemouth	107	(0)
2019–2020	→ Qarabağ (loan)	10	(0)
2020	→ AC Milan (loan)	2	(0)
2021–2023	Everton	4	(0)
2023–2024	Queens Park Rangers	45	(0)
2024–2025	Everton	0	(0)
2025–2026	Leicester City	11	(0)

International career
2004–2007	Canada U20	11	(0)
2009–2020	Bosnia and Herzegovina	63	(0)
- * Club domestic league appearances and goals as of 21 April 2026

Asmir Begović (Bosnian pronunciation: [âsmir bêːɡoʋitɕ]; born 20 June 1987) is a Bosnian professional footballer who plays as a goalkeeper.

Begović started his senior career at Portsmouth, signing for them in the summer of 2003. After a sequence of loans, he made his Premier League debut in May 2009 and was sold to Stoke City for £3.25 million in February 2010. In the 2012–13 season, he played every league match and won the club's Player of the Year award. In November 2013, Begović became the fifth goalkeeper to score a goal in the Premier League, scoring from 97.5 yards (89.15 meters) against Southampton after 13 seconds, also getting the World Record for "longest goal scored in football". In July 2015, he joined Premier League champions Chelsea for a fee of £8 million, remaining second-choice until his move to AFC Bournemouth two years later. After losing his place to Artur Boruc early in 2019, he was loaned to Qarabağ and AC Milan before signing for Everton. From there he played at Queens Park Rangers, Everton for a second spell and Leicester City.

Begović represented Canada at youth level playing for them at the 2007 FIFA U-20 World Cup. In 2009, he decided to change his allegiance and represent his native country, Bosnia and Herzegovina. He soon established himself as their number one goalkeeper and helped them qualify for the 2014 FIFA World Cup, their first major tournament.

== Early life ==
Begović was born in Trebinje, Bosnia and Herzegovina, which was at the time part of Yugoslavia, to a Muslim family of Bosnian origin. His father, Amir, was also a goalkeeper who played for Leotar and Iskra Bugojno whilst his mother, Ajnija, hails from Stolac. The Begović family fled the Bosnian War to Germany when Asmir was four years old, where he began to play organised football with local youth club FC Kirchhausen in Heilbronn. When he was 10, his family moved to Edmonton in Canada.

== Club career ==
=== Early career ===
Begović attended the St. Francis Xavier High School where he played for their academy. He also played in the Edmonton Minor Soccer Association with Southwest Sting Soccer Club which earned him a call-up to the Canada under-17 squad. In 2003, he earned a trial with Portsmouth and Tottenham Hotspur and his representatives paid for him to fly over to England. After two days with Portsmouth, coaches David Hurst and Mark O'Connor were suitably impressed and offered Begović a contract before his trial at Tottenham could begin.

=== Portsmouth ===
Begović signed a youth contract with Portsmouth in the summer of 2003 and due to him not having a European Union passport he spent two years on an education visa which prevented him from featuring in matches which involved money being taken on the gate. After playing for the youth team he then spent time on loan at La Louvière in Belgium in 2005 where he played twice in the Belgian top flight. Begović got his UK visa in the summer of 2006 which allowed him to sign on loan for Macclesfield Town in the 2006–07 season, making his Football League debut in a 1–1 draw at Stockport County on 25 November as an 80th minute substitute, after injury to first choice goalkeeper Jonny Brain. His loan spell was cut short, however, as he sustained a knee injury after making just three appearances. In August 2007, Begović was loaned to AFC Bournemouth in League One in a deal lasting until January 2008. He was recalled from Bournemouth on 11 October 2007. On 8 December 2007, Begović was named in Portsmouth's 16-man matchday squad for the first time in a Premier League game in a match against Aston Villa as a substitute.

In March 2008, he signed for Yeovil Town on loan for a month with Portsmouth having the right to recall him back when they so desired. On 29 March Begović made his debut for Yeovil, keeping a clean sheet against Bristol Rovers. He was subsequently recalled after making two appearances despite Yeovil trying to re-sign him on an emergency loan. The "Glovers" manager Russell Slade revealed in June 2008 that he wanted to sign Begović on loan again after Steve Mildenhall joined Southend United. The move was delayed however due to his grandfather dying. He rejoined Yeovil on loan, this time for three months in August 2008. He made 14 league appearances, keeping three clean sheets in a struggling Yeovil side.

Begović made his Portsmouth debut against Sunderland in their 3–1 win on 18 May 2009. Following his Premier League debut for Pompey Begović expressed his delight. "It was fantastic, to make your first Premier League appearance is something I've looked forward to for a long long time." He joined Championship team Ipswich Town on loan until 16 January 2010 in October. On 23 November Begović was recalled to Portsmouth due to David James being injured, ending his Ipswich Town loan after having played six matches. On his return to Fratton Park he went on to play 15 first team matches during the 2009–10 season.

=== Stoke City ===
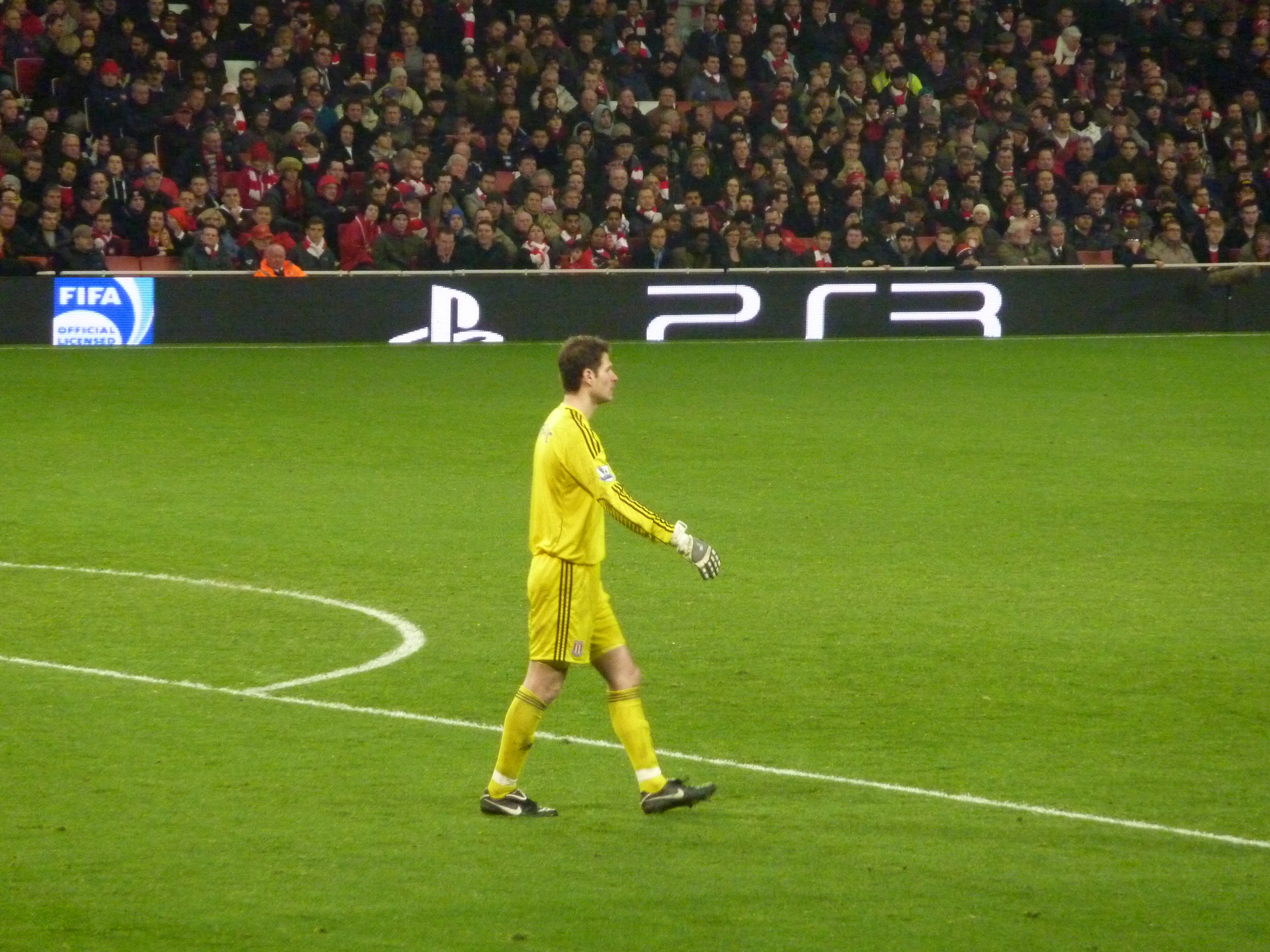
Begović playing for Stoke City in 2011

On 1 February 2010, Begović signed a four-and-a-half-year contract at Stoke City for a fee of £3.25 million. Following the signing manager Tony Pulis revealed that he had been tracking Begović for a while. "We have been tracking Asmir for some time and we believe that potentially he is the best young keeper in the country". Begović had also held talks with Tottenham Hotspur prior to joining Stoke, but opted for the "Potters" due to "sporting reasons". He later revealed his relief at leaving Portsmouth following their financial turmoil during the 2009–10 season. Portsmouth ended up owing Tottenham money for Begović, despite him turning them down, as Tottenham had already paid Portsmouth an instalment on the transfer. Portsmouth were ordered to pay Tottenham £1 million by the Premier League over the aborted transfer as Spurs had already made an initial payment for both Begović and Younès Kaboul.

Begović made his debut for Stoke against Chelsea on 25 April 2010, replacing the injured Thomas Sørensen in the 35th minute, where he conceded five goals. He kept his first clean sheet for City in a 0–0 draw with Everton on 1 May 2010. He also played in the last two games of the 2009–10 season against Fulham and Manchester United.

At the start of the 2010–11 season Begović was handed the number one jersey by manager Tony Pulis. Begović allegedly refused to play in a League Cup match against Shrewsbury Town, a decision which Pulis said was "totally disrespectful". Begović on the other hand, denied that he had refused to play. Despite this Begović played his first match of the season in the next round of the League Cup against Fulham and then West Ham United. He made his first league appearance on 30 October against Everton replacing the injured Sørensen. Following this Begović took over from Sørensen as City's first choice 'keeper, he also 'made peace' with Tony Pulis with his absence from the Shrewsbury match. After a narrow defeat at Arsenal in February 2011 Begović believes that Stoke are developing well. The following week against West Ham, Begović made an error gifting a goal to Demba Ba. Begović missed out on an FA Cup Final with second choice keeper Sørensen being preferred to play in cup matches.

Begović started the 2011–12 season as first choice keeper and earned praise from Tony Pulis after he kept five clean sheets in six matches including a fine display against Liverpool on 11 September. However, Begović then conceded eighteen goals in the next seven matches, including a woeful 5–0 defeat by Bolton Wanderers a performance which led him to apologise to the supporters for his display. Following the Bolton match he was dropped in favour of Sørensen. Begović signed a new four-and-a-half-year contract extension with Stoke in December 2011 keeping him at the club until 2016. He regained number 1 spot in March 2012. Begović continued as City's number one stopper in 2012–13 and began the season in fine form conceding just 12 goals in the opening 15 matches. Despite Stoke having a poor second half to the season, Begović remained in decent enough form and won the Player of the Year Award.

Begović remained first choice keeper going into the 2013–14 season under new manager Mark Hughes and produced a man of the match performance on the opening day against Liverpool. On 2 November 2013, Begović scored after 13 seconds against Southampton at a distance of 97.5 yards, after his long kick downfield deceived Artur Boruc. His goal against Southampton earned him a place in the 2015 Guinness World Records for the 'longest goal scored in football'.

It's a cool feeling but it was a fortunate incident. I feel a bit bad for Boruc. It is a long ball that got caught in the wind and it took a wicked bounce. It's not nice to be on the receiving end of those things as a goalkeeper. It does not make a goalkeeper look good and after it I did not want to celebrate out of respect for him.

— Begović speaks after scoring against Southampton.

Begović missed his first League match for almost two years at Newcastle United on 26 December after he broke his finger in a training session which ruled him out for five weeks. He returned to the starting line-up against Chelsea on 26 January 2014. Begović played 33 times for Stoke in 2013–14 as the team finished in 9th position.

Begović kept his 50th clean sheet for Stoke on 4 March 2015 in a 2–0 victory over Everton. Begović kept his place as number one keeper in 2014–15 playing in 36 matches as Stoke finished the season again in ninth position and they ended the campaign with a 6–1 victory against Liverpool. He was dropped by Mark Hughes for three matches in May after making a mistake against Sunderland. This prompted media speculation about his future at the club. Indeed, Begović departed the Britannia Stadium in July 2015, in total he spent five and a half seasons at Stoke, making 172 appearances.

=== Chelsea ===
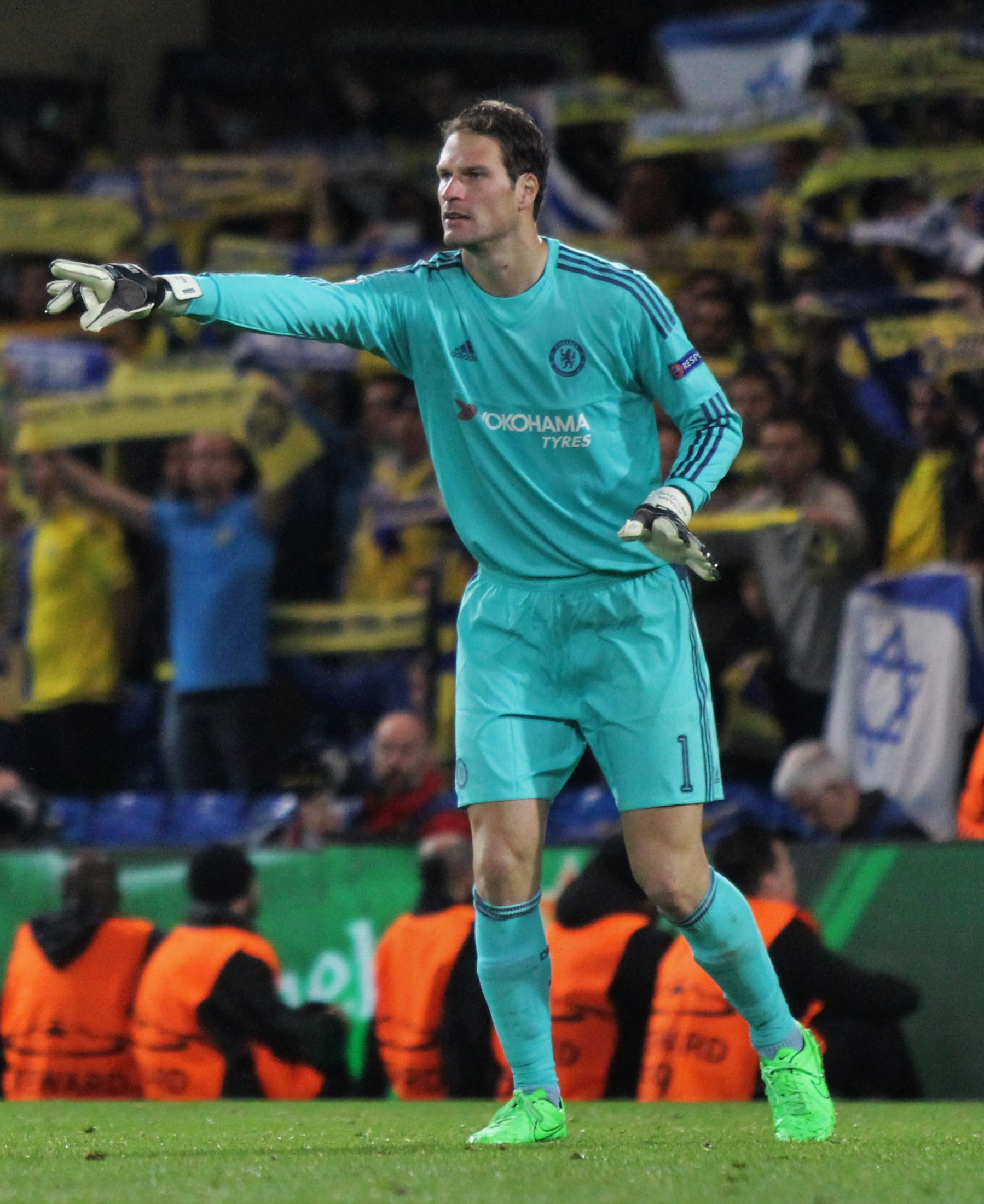
Begović playing for Chelsea in 2015

On 13 July 2015, Chelsea signed Begović on a four-year deal for a fee of £8 million. As part of the deal Chelsea also offered midfielder Marco van Ginkel in part exchange to Stoke on loan for one season.

He made his debut nine days later on Chelsea's pre-season tour, coming on at half time for Thibaut Courtois with Chelsea 1–0 up against the New York Red Bulls, but the match ended in a 4–2 defeat. His first competitive fixture was the 2015 FA Community Shield on 2 August at Wembley Stadium, in which he was unused in a 1–0 loss to rivals Arsenal. Six days later he came on as a substitute for Oscar when Courtois was sent off for conceding a penalty with a foul on Bafétimbi Gomis, who converted it for a 2–2 draw. On 16 August, Begović made his first competitive start for Chelsea in a 3–0 away loss to Manchester City. A month later, he earned the first clean sheet of the season for Chelsea in a UEFA Champions League match against Maccabi Tel Aviv which ended in a 4–0 win for Chelsea. He kept a sequence of three clean sheets before Courtois returned to the team on 5 December.

In his second season with Chelsea, Begović didn't get much playing time, and there were speculations that he would leave the club in the winter transfer window. However, since Chelsea couldn't find a replacement for him, he was forced to stay at Stamford Bridge. In spite of featuring in only two league games, he received a winners' medal as Chelsea won the 2016–17 Premier League.

=== AFC Bournemouth ===
On 30 May 2017, Begović signed for Premier League club Bournemouth on a long-term contract for an undisclosed fee. He debuted on 12 August on the opening day of the new Premier League season, in a 0–1 loss against West Bromwich Albion. He kept his first clean sheet in the season on 30 September, in a 0–0 draw against Leicester City. On 31 January 2018, he played in a 3–0 win at his former club Chelsea. He played all 38 league games for the Cherries and manager Eddie Howe praised Begovic as being worth “every penny” of his £10 million fee.

After conceding 14 goals over four consecutive defeats, Begović was dropped for the first time in January 2019, for Artur Boruc — the former rival against whom he scored his world record-setting goal in 2013. The Polish veteran then secured his place as Bournemouth's goalkeeper at Begović's expense.

On 2 September 2019, Begović was sent on a six-month loan to Qarabağ. He made his debut 13 days later, in a 2–0 victory against Neftçi in the Azerbaijan Premier League. He signed on loan for Serie A club AC Milan for the rest of the 2019–20 season on 13 January 2020. He played twice, first on 22 February in a 1–1 draw at Fiorentina, as a 52nd-minute replacement for the injured Gianluigi Donnarumma, then in a 2–1 home loss to Genoa on 8 March.

Begović made 45 Championship appearances for Bournemouth in the 2020–21 season, keeping 15 clean sheets.

=== Everton ===
On 20 July 2021, Begović joined Everton on an initial one-year contract with an option for a further year. He made his debut on 24 August in the second round of the EFL Cup, a 2–1 win at Huddersfield Town. Second-choice to Jordan Pickford, he played three Premier League games in his first season, starting with a 3–0 loss at Aston Villa on 18 September.

Begović departed Everton at the end of the 2022–23 season, having rejected the offer of a new contract.

=== Queens Park Rangers ===
On 17 July 2023, Begović signed for Championship club Queens Park Rangers.

He departed the club upon the expiration of his contract in June 2024.

=== Return to Everton ===
On 23 August 2024, Begović returned to Everton, signing a short-term contract until the end of the 2024–25 season.

On 20 May 2025, Everton announced that he would be leaving the club at the expiration of his contract, ending Begović's second spell with the side.

=== Leicester City ===
On 29 July 2025, Begović joined Championship club Leicester City on a one-year deal, reuniting with former Queens Park Rangers manager Martí Cifuentes. On 4 November, he made his debut for the club as a halftime substitute for Jakub Stolarczyk in a 1–1 draw at Middlesbrough.

In July 2026, Begović became a free agent following the expiration of his contract with Leicester.

== International career ==
=== Canada ===
Begović was the starting goalkeeper for Canada U20 in the 2007 FIFA U-20 World Cup. He made several difficult saves for his team in a 3–0 loss to Chile and let in one goal against Austria. Late in the third match of the tournament, after allowing two goals, Begović came out of his area to play a long ball from a Congo defender. The ball took a high bounce off the wet pitch, forcing him to use his hands to prevent it from going over his head. He was shown a straight red card, and midfielder Jonathan Beaulieu-Bourgault had to play in goal, as Canada had used up their three substitutes.

On 14 August 2007, 20-year-old Begović received his first call-up to the Canada senior squad for the friendly match with Iceland, but didn't see any action on the pitch. In November 2008, he accepted another call for Canada's 2010 FIFA World Cup qualifier versus Jamaica, but again didn't get any playing time as Lars Hirschfeld was the preferred option in goal.

Players with dual nationality, like Begović, who had already played for a country's national team at youth level, were not allowed to switch nationalities after they turned 21, but on 3 June 2009 FIFA removed the age limit. In late June 2009, he spoke with Bosnian head coach Miroslav Blažević about the possibility of making his debut for Bosnia and Herzegovina. Quotes in the Bosnian media seemed to indicate Begović's intent to play for the country of his birth. Begović missed the 2009 CONCACAF Gold Cup for Canada saying Portsmouth wanted him to spend the whole pre-season with the club. On 12 July 2009 on Full-Time: Vancouver's Soccer Show on the TEAM 1040 radio in Canada he indicated his desire to continue with the Canada national team. He suggested that comments he had made to Bosnia's head coach had been misinterpreted due to poor translation. In the same interview, Begović also said:

I've played for Canada for a long time. There's no decision, I don't want to switch... but there is a state of uncertainty with Canada soccer (next coach, etc). Get things in place and I'm happy to stay with Canada, that's where I see my future... I've been approached by Bosnia. There were talks... but I have no intention on playing for Bosnia.

=== Bosnia and Herzegovina ===
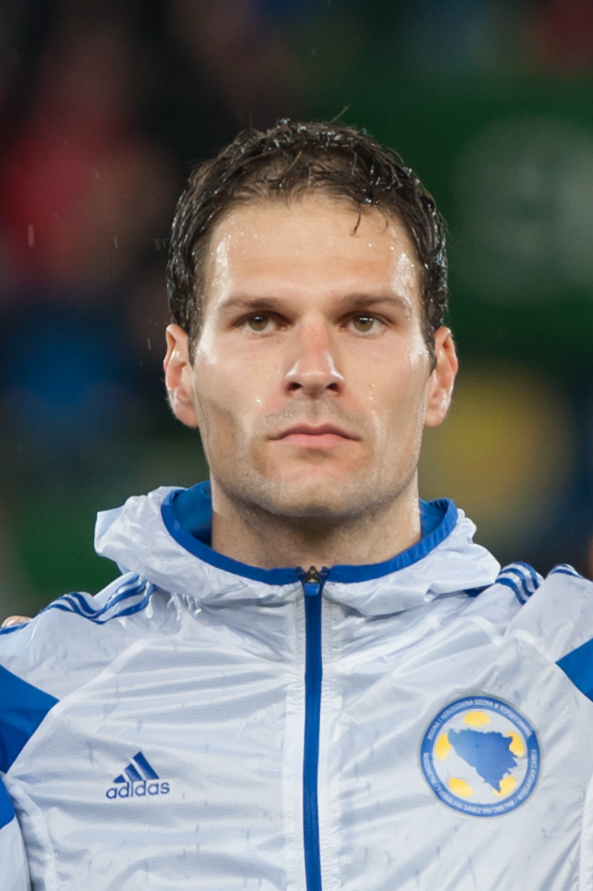
Begović lining up for Bosnia and Herzegovina in 2015

However, less than two months later, Begović changed his mind. On 21 August 2009, he accepted a call-up for two Bosnia 2010 World Cup qualifiers: away against Armenia on 5 September, and four days later against Turkey at home in Zenica. Moreover, he did not play in either match. During the pre-match preparations, Begović gave an interview to the Bosnian web portal, stating among other things:

I was born in Trebinje, Bosnia and Herzegovina is my homeland and I wouldn't be disappointed even if I don't get a chance to play right away.

In October 2009, Begović debuted for another 2010 FIFA World Cup qualification match against Estonia, coming on as a substitute to Kenan Hasagić in the 92nd minute of the match, in which Bosnia won the match with a final score of 2–0.

On 3 March 2010, Begović played his first significant role in a match as he got to play the second half in a 2–1 friendly victory against Ghana; Begović did not concede any goals. He received his first full appearance against Sweden in May where Bosnia and Herzegovina lost the match 4–2, but Begović was not responsible for any of the goals according to the Bosnian media, as they blamed Bosnia's defense for the goals.

Begović caused controversy after he pulled out of Bosnia and Herzegovina's friendly matches against Slovakia and Mexico. In August 2012, Begović became first-choice goalkeeper for the national team. On 27 May 2013, he has been voted the 2012 Bosnian Footballer of the Year by the Bosnian Sport Writers' Jury. On 16 October 2013, Bosnia and Herzegovina defeated Lithuania 1–0 to qualify for the 2014 FIFA World Cup, their first major tournament. In June 2014, Begović was named in Bosnia and Herzegovina's squad for the 2014 FIFA World Cup, where he played full 90 minutes in all three matches.

== Personal life ==
On 18 June 2011, Begović married his American-born wife, Nicolle Howard, with whom he has two daughters. In April 2011 he joined FC Edmonton's charity 'Kicks for Kids Program'.

Begović was born in Bosnia and Herzegovina while it was part of the SFR Yugoslavia, and moved to Germany at the age of four. Growing up in Germany, Begović supported Bayern Munich and cites goalkeeping great Oliver Kahn as his inspiration. He also attended matches at his local club VfB Stuttgart. Along with his native Bosnian, Begović is fluent in three additional languages: German, English and French. In October 2013 he set up his own charity, the Asmir Begović Foundation. His mother is from Stolac.

Begović's younger brother Denis had a brief spell with Bristol City's under-18s as a goalkeeper.

In April 2020, Begović played a football video game against fellow professional Alphonso Davies, who also came to Canada as a child refugee, to raise funds for the United Nations High Commissioner for Refugees.

Begović is a Muslim and does fasting during the Islamic month of Ramadan. In 2025, the Everton official media interviewed him alongside teammate Abdoulaye Doucouré about the experience of going through a fast as an active professional footballer.

== Career statistics ==
=== Club ===
As of match played 21 April 2026

Appearances and goals by club, season and competition
Club	Season	League			National Cup (Note: Includes FA Cup, Azerbaijan Cup)		League Cup (Note: Includes Football League/EFL Cup)		Other		Total	
Club	Season	Division	Apps	Goals	Apps	Goals	Apps	Goals	Apps	Goals	Apps	Goals
Portsmouth	2005–06	Premier League	0	0	0	0	0	0	—		0	0
Portsmouth	2006–07	Premier League	0	0	—		0	0	—		0	0
Portsmouth	2007–08	Premier League	0	0	0	0	0	0	—		0	0
Portsmouth	2008–09	Premier League	2	0	0	0	0	0	0	0	2	0
Portsmouth	2009–10	Premier League	9	0	3	0	3	0	—		15	0
Portsmouth	Total		11	0	3	0	3	0	0	0	17	0
La Louvière (loan)	2005–06	Belgian First Division	2	0	—		—		—		2	0
Macclesfield Town (loan)	2006–07	League Two	3	0	1	0	—		—		4	0
AFC Bournemouth (loan)	2007–08	League One	8	0	0	0	0	0	1 (Note: Appearance in Football League Trophy)	0	9	0
Yeovil Town (loan)	2007–08	League One	2	0	—		—		—		2	0
Yeovil Town (loan)	2008–09	League One	14	0	—		—		0	0	14	0
Yeovil Town (loan)	Total		16	0	—		—		0	0	16	0
Ipswich Town (loan)	2009–10	Championship	6	0	—		—		—		6	0
Stoke City	2009–10	Premier League	4	0	—		—		—		4	0
Stoke City	2010–11	Premier League	28	0	0	0	2	0	—		30	0
Stoke City	2011–12	Premier League	23	0	3	0	0	0	5 (Note: Appearances in UEFA Europa League)	0	31	0
Stoke City	2012–13	Premier League	38	0	0	0	0	0	—		38	0
Stoke City	2013–14	Premier League	32	1	1	0	0	0	—		33	1
Stoke City	2014–15	Premier League	35	0	0	0	1	0	—		36	0
Stoke City	Total		160	1	4	0	3	0	5	0	172	1
Chelsea	2015–16	Premier League	17	0	1	0	2	0	5 (Note: Appearances in UEFA Champions League)	0	25	0
Chelsea	2016–17	Premier League	2	0	3	0	3	0	—		8	0
Chelsea	Total		19	0	4	0	5	0	5	0	33	0
AFC Bournemouth	2017–18	Premier League	38	0	0	0	0	0	—		38	0
AFC Bournemouth	2018–19	Premier League	24	0	0	0	0	0	—		24	0
AFC Bournemouth	2019–20	Premier League	0	0	0	0	0	0	—		0	0
AFC Bournemouth	2020–21	Championship	45	0	3	0	1	0	2 (Note: Appearances in Championship play-offs)	0	51	0
AFC Bournemouth	Total		107	0	3	0	1	0	2	0	113	0
Qarabağ (loan)	2019–20	Azerbaijan Premier League	10	0	2	0	—		5	0	17	0
AC Milan (loan)	2019–20	Serie A	2	0	0	0	—		—		2	0
Everton	2021–22	Premier League	3	0	2	0	2	0	—		7	0
Everton	2022–23	Premier League	1	0	0	0	2	0	—		3	0
Everton	Total		4	0	2	0	4	0	—		10	0
Queens Park Rangers	2023–24	Championship	45	0	1	0	0	0	—		46	0
Everton	2024–25	Premier League	0	0	0	0	0	0	—		0	0
Leicester City	2025–26	Championship	11	0	1	0	0	0	—		12	0
Career total			404	1	21	0	16	0	18	0	459	1

=== International ===
As of match played 7 September 2020

National team	Year	Apps	Goals
Bosnia and Herzegovina	2009	1	0
Bosnia and Herzegovina	2010	3	0
Bosnia and Herzegovina	2011	5	0
Bosnia and Herzegovina	2012	9	0
Bosnia and Herzegovina	2013	9	0
Bosnia and Herzegovina	2014	11	0
Bosnia and Herzegovina	2015	9	0
Bosnia and Herzegovina	2016	7	0
Bosnia and Herzegovina	2017	7	0
Bosnia and Herzegovina	2018	1	0
Bosnia and Herzegovina	2019	0	0
Bosnia and Herzegovina	2020	1	0
Total		63	0

== Honours ==
Chelsea

- Premier League: 2016–17
- FA Cup runner-up: 2016–17

Qarabağ FK

- Azerbaijan Premier League: 2019–20

Canada U23

- CONCACAF Men's Pre-Olympic Tournament third place: 2008

Individual

- Canadian U–20 Player of the Year: 2007
- Bosnian Footballer of the Year: 2012
- EFL Championship Team of the Season: 2020–21

== See also ==
- List of goalscoring goalkeepers
- List of goalkeepers who have scored in the Premier League
