= Ashan Holgate =

English footballer (born 1986)

Personal information
- Full name: Ashan Bayyan Sellasse Holgate
- Date of birth: 9 November 1986 (age 39)
- Place of birth: Swindon, England
- Positions: Striker; midfielder

Youth career
- Swindon Town

Senior career*
Years	Team	Apps	(Gls)
2004–2007	Swindon Town	9	(0)
2005	→ Basingstoke Town (loan)	1	(0)
2006	→ Salisbury City (loan)	2	(0)
2006–2007	→ Newport County (loan)	1	(0)
2007	→ Macclesfield Town (loan)	6	(1)
2006	Weston-super-Mare	14	(4)
2007–2008	Eastleigh	7	(0)
2008	→ Cirencester Town (loan)	6	(1)
2008–2009	Weston-super-Mare	9	(0)
2009–2010	Newport County	10	(0)
2010–2011	Swindon Supermarine	0	(0)
2011–2012	Maidenhead United	21	(11)
2012–2013	Oxford City	14	(1)
2014–2016	Chippenham Town	44	(12)
- * Club domestic league appearances and goals

Ashan Bayyan Sellasse Holgate (born 9 November 1986) is an English former footballer who plays as a striker or midfielder.

Holgate rejoined Newport County on a permanent contract on 13 October 2009. However, his contract at Newport was terminated by mutual consent on 22 January 2010. He then joined Maidenhead United, where he scored 11 goals. Holgate signed for Southern League Premier Division club Swindon Supermarine on 27 February 2010.

On 23 November 2012, Holgate joined Oxford City.

In December 2014, Holgate signed for Chippenham Town.

In January 2016, Holgate signed for Slough Town, scoring on his debut against Leamington.
