= David Rouse =

English footballer and coach

Personal information
- Full name: David Edward Rouse
- Date of birth: 6 March 1976 (age 50)
- Place of birth: Rochford, England
- Position: Goalkeeper

Senior career*
Years	Team	Apps	(Gls)
1993–1994	Stockport County	0	(0)
1995–1996	Cheadle Town		
1996–1997	Mount Wellington		
1997–1998	Bury	0	(0)
1998–2004	Cheadle Heath Nomads		
2004–2005	Hong Kong FC		
2005–2006	Cheadle Heath Nomads		
2007	Macclesfield Town	1	(0)
- * Club domestic league appearances and goals

David Edward Rouse (born 6 March 1976) is an English former footballer who played as a goalkeeper in the Football League for Macclesfield Town.

== Career ==
As a youth Rouse was with Stockport County and then on Bury's books, before moving into coaching while playing semi-professional football. He worked for eight years at Manchester United, where he worked with young goalkeepers such as Luke Steele, Tom Heaton, Tommy Lee, Ben Amos, Sam Johnstone and Luke Daniels. In the 2006–07 season he was goalkeeping coach at Macclesfield Town, and played once for the first team in an injury crisis, in a 1–0 defeat to Barnet, making his Football League debut at the age of 30. He also worked with Rochdale and Wigan Athletic before joining Queens Park Rangers as goalkeeping coach in February 2008. He was first team goalkeeping coach at Loftus Road for four years.

In December 2014, Rouse joined Al Ain in the United Arab Emirates as head goalkeeping coach. In his first season there, Al Ain won their 12th UAE Pro League League title and reached the knockout stages of the AFC Champions League.

In September 2017, Rouse was named as the goalkeeping coach for the Chinese Taipei national football team.

Rouse was appointed goalkeeping coach at Stoke City in December 2019. Rouse left his position at Stoke in November 2022.

David joined the coaching staff of Northern Ireland in March 2023. He joined Al Wahda FC in Abu Dhabi in November 2023 as Head of Goalkeeping, working concurrently with his national team commitments with Northern Ireland.

== Career statistics ==
Appearances and goals by club, season and competition
Club	Season	League			FA Cup		League Cup		Other		Total	
Club	Season	Division	Apps	Goals	Apps	Goals	Apps	Goals	Apps	Goals	Apps	Goals
Macclesfield Town	2006–07	League Two	1	0	0	0	0	0	0	0	1	0
Career total			1	0	0	0	0	0	0	0	1	0
