= Andrew Teague =

English footballer

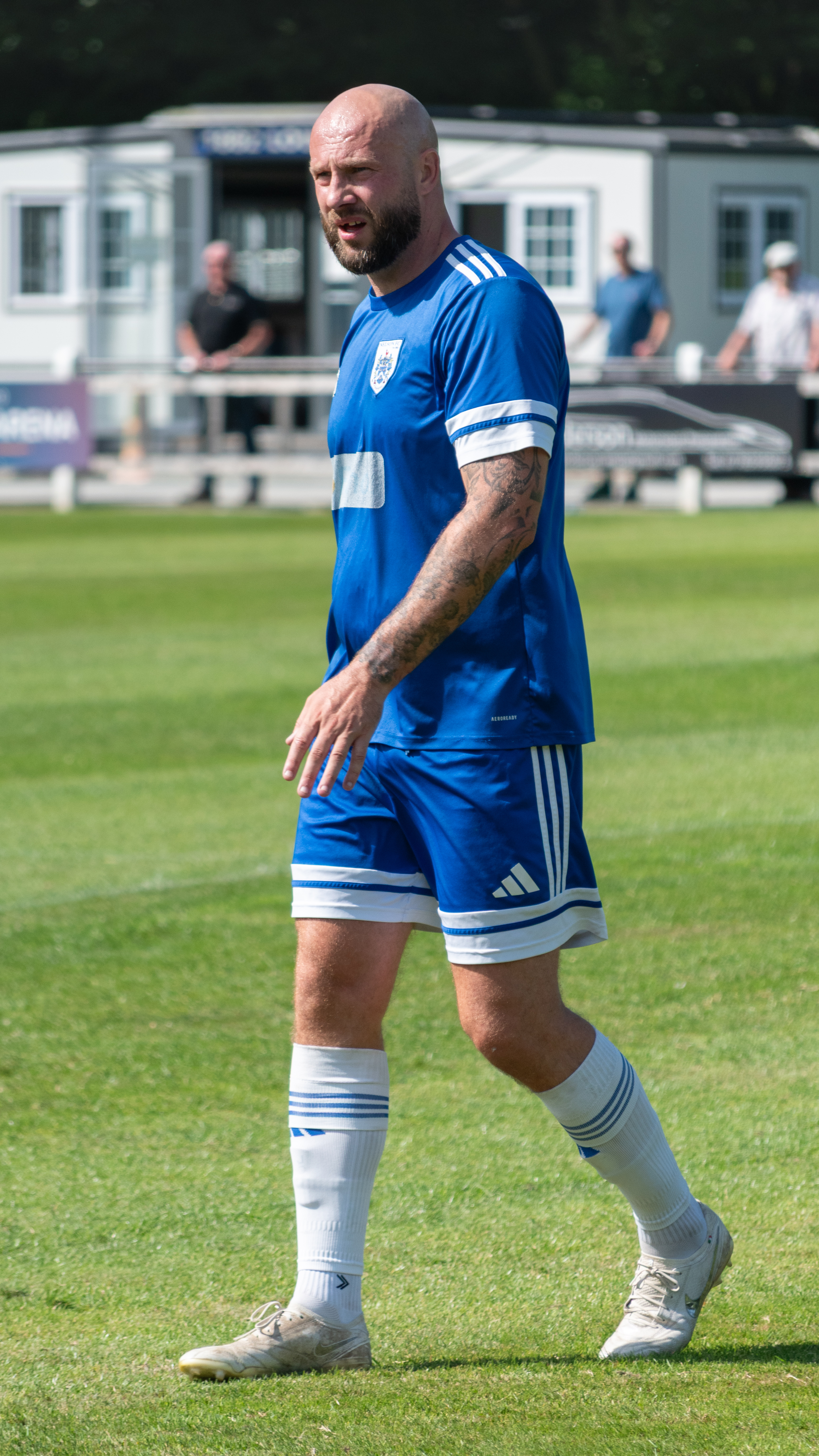
- Teague playing for Nelson in 2026

Personal information
- Full name: Andrew Harry Teague
- Date of birth: 5 February 1986 (age 40)
- Place of birth: Preston, England
- Position: Central defender

Team information
- Current team: Nelson

Youth career
- Macclesfield Town

Senior career*
Years	Team	Apps	(Gls)
2005–2008	Macclesfield Town	44	(2)
2008	→ Tamworth (loan)		
2008	→ Hyde United (loan)		
2008–2009	Leigh Genesis		
2009–2011	Lancaster City		
2011–2020	Chorley		
2020–2024	Lancaster City		
2024	Clitheroe		
2024–2026	Ramsbottom United	38	(2)
2026–	Nelson	2	(0)

Managerial career
- 2023: Lancaster City (caretaker)
- * Club domestic league appearances and goals as of 15:32, 22 May 2026 (UTC)

Andrew Harry Teague (born 5 February 1986) is an English professional footballer who plays for Nelson as a central defender.

== Career ==
Born in Preston, Teague began his career with Macclesfield Town. He suffered a broken leg on 25 November 2006, after colliding with teammate Jonny Brain (who also broke his leg) in a game against Stockport County and was ruled out for the rest of the season.

He spent loan spells with Tamworth and Hyde United, before he was released by Macclefield in the summer of 2008.

He spent some time with Leigh Genesis, before moving to Lancaster City in January 2009, where he became club captain. He moved to Chorley in January 2011, making 390 appearances for the club, also becoming club captain. He won the Lancashire FA Challenge Trophy in 2015.

He returned to Lancaster City in June 2020. After serving as captain and caretaker manager at Lancaster, Teague moved to Clitheroe in January 2024.

In June 2024, Teague dropped down a level to join North West Counties Football League Premier Division side Ramsbottom United as a player and assistant manager to Steve Wilkes. He stated that it "was a decision that took a lot of thought as there were offers in from higher up the pyramid". He was a regular in his first season at the club making 34 starts as Ramsbottom finished in 3rd, losing out in the play-offs semi-final to Padiham. In June 2025, he announced that he would be staying for a further year at Ramsbottom. He moved to Nelson, making his debut in April 2026.
