= Jonny Brain =

English footballer

Personal information
- Full name: Jonathon Robert Brain
- Date of birth: 11 February 1983 (age 43)
- Place of birth: Carlisle, England
- Height: 6 ft 3 in (1.91 m)
- Position: Goalkeeper

Youth career
- 1998–1999: Carlisle United

Senior career*
Years	Team	Apps	(Gls)
1999–2002	Newcastle United	0	(0)
2002	Carlisle United	0	(0)
2003–2006	Port Vale	59	(0)
2006–2010	Macclesfield Town	125	(0)
2010–2011	Walsall	16	(0)
2011–2013	Nantwich Town		
2013–2014	Stafford Rangers		
Total		200+	(0+)
- * Club domestic league appearances and goals

Jonathon Robert Brain (born 11 February 1983) is an English former footballer who played as a goalkeeper.

A former Carlisle United trainee, he joined Newcastle United in 1999. He moved on to Port Vale in 2003, never having played for Newcastle or Carlisle. Three years later, he transferred to Macclesfield Town, where he became the first-choice keeper. He spent the 2010–11 campaign with Walsall. He then entered the non-League scene with Nantwich Town before joining Stafford Rangers in July 2013.

== Career ==
=== Early years ===
Born in Carlisle, Cumbria, Brain started his career with Carlisle United, before moving on to Newcastle United in 1999. He never played a game for United, and in August 2002, he returned to Third Division Carlisle on a month-to-month basis contract.

=== Port Vale ===
Brain was signed by Brian Horton for Second Division Port Vale in August 2003, giving up his job as a sports instructor at a holiday park in the process.

He went on to make 36 appearances in 2003–04, with the club's regular keeper Mark Goodlad out injured. He played 32 games in the inaugural season of League One. He was limited to a single EFL Trophy appearance in 2005–06, as the club's No. 1 Goodlad enjoyed his first injury-free season since Brain's arrival.

=== Macclesfield Town ===
In June 2006 he was once more signed by Horton, who had since taken up the management position at Macclesfield Town. After playing just nine league games for his new club, Brain suffered a broken leg on 25 November 2006, after colliding with Andrew Teague (who also broke his leg) in a game against Stockport County, and was ruled out for the rest of the season.

Initially turning down a new contract, he was given a short-term contract at the start of the 2007–08 season, and went on to make a successful return from his injury to reclaim his place as Macclesfield's first-choice goalkeeper, making thirty appearances in all competitions. At the end of the season, manager Keith Alexander offered Brain a three-year contract, which he signed.

In 2008–09 he played 52 games to become only the third player in the club's history to enjoy an ever-present campaign in the Football League. At the end of the 2009–10 season he was named in the League Two Team of the Week for the last week of March, but was released by the club after turning down a new contract.

=== Walsall ===
He signed a one-year deal with Walsall in June 2010. He started off the 2010–11 season as first-choice goalkeeper, before losing his place to club legend Jimmy Walker, who was re-signed in October 2010. Brain vowed to win his first-team place back off the 37-year-old, who was signed after a poor start to the season by Brain. At the end of the campaign Brain as released, whilst Walker was offered a new deal.

=== Non-League ===
He began training with Bradford City, but did not sign a deal with the club. Brain instead joined Nantwich Town in the Northern Premier League Premier Division for the 2011–12 season. He helped the "Dabbers" to the FA Cup first round for the first time in the club's history in 2011, at which point they were eliminated by League One Milton Keynes Dons. He signed a new two-year contract with the club in March 2012, and was voted the club's Player of the Season. The club finished 14th in 2012–13, and Brain was transfer-listed as the club looked to cut costs.

Brain joined Stafford Rangers on a one-year contract in July 2013. He left Marston Road in March 2014.

== Career statistics ==
Appearances and goals by club, season and competition
Club	Season	League			FA Cup		League Cup		Other		Total	
Club	Season	Division	Apps	Goals	Apps	Goals	Apps	Goals	Apps	Goals	Apps	Goals
Carlisle United	2002–03	Third Division	0	0	0	0	0	0	0	0	0	0
Port Vale	2003–04	Second Division	32	0	3	0	0	0	1 (Note: Appearance(s) in the EFL Trophy.)	0	36	0
Port Vale	2004–05	League One	27	0	2	0	1	0	2	0	32	0
Port Vale	2005–06	League One	0	0	0	0	0	0	1	0	1	0
Port Vale	Total		59	0	5	0	1	0	4	0	69	0
Macclesfield Town	2006–07	League Two	9	0	2	0	1	0	1	0	13	0
Macclesfield Town	2007–08	League Two	29	0	0	0	0	0	1	0	30	0
Macclesfield Town	2008–09	League Two	46	0	3	0	2	0	1	0	52	0
Macclesfield Town	2009–10	League Two	41	0	0	0	1	0	1	0	43	0
Macclesfield Town	Total		125	0	5	0	4	0	4	0	138	0
Walsall	2010–11	League One	16	0	0	0	1	0	1	0	18	0
Career total (Note: Statistics for Nantwich Town and Stafford Rangers not recorded.)			200	0	10	0	6	0	9	0	225	0

== Honours ==
Individual

- Nantwich Town Player of the Year: 2011–12
