= Colin Heath =

English footballer (born 1983)

Personal information
- Date of birth: 31 December 1983 (age 42)
- Place of birth: Chesterfield, England
- Position: Striker

Youth career
- Darley Dale
- 1995–1998: Leeds United
- 1998–2000: Manchester United

Senior career*
Years	Team	Apps	(Gls)
2000–2006	Manchester United	0	(0)
2003–2004	→ Royal Antwerp (loan)	13	(0)
2004–2005	→ Cambridge United (loan)	6	(0)
2005	→ Swindon Town (loan)	11	(1)
2006	Chesterfield	4	(0)
2006–2007	Macclesfield Town	25	(4)
2007–2008	Farsley Celtic	13	(2)
Total		72	(7)
- * Club domestic league appearances and goals

Colin Heath (born 31 December 1983) is an English former footballer who played as a striker or attacking midfielder for Cambridge United, Swindon Town, Chesterfield and Macclesfield Town and for Belgian club Royal Antwerp.

== Career ==
Heath was born in Chesterfield, grew up in Birchover, and played for Darley Dale as a boy. He joined Leeds United's youth system as an 11-year-old, and moved to Manchester United at 14. He earned his professional contract at the end of 2000. He joined Royal Antwerp of the Belgian First Division on loan in January 2003; he played 13 league games in the 2003–04 season, but saved his goalscoring for friendly matches. He then joined Football League Two side Cambridge United on a month's loan in late 2004, and made his English first-team debut on 7 December in a 2–1 defeat at home to Scunthorpe United. He spent the first half of the 2005–06 season on loan to Swindon Town, but scored only once, against Yeovil Town in his home league debut, and struggled to maintain a first-team place.

He returned to Manchester United in January 2006 and was released, to join Chesterfield until the end of the season. He moved on to Macclesfield Town, linking up with former Manchester United colleague Tommy Lee, but was released by manager Paul Ince after just one season. In September 2007, after an extended trial with Chester City, he signed for Farsley Celtic of the Conference National. Heath struggled to hold down a first-team place due to the form of Damien Reeves. After a handful of appearances, including helping Farsley to reach the last 16 of the FA Trophy for the first time, he left the club.

Although no longer a professional, Heath still plays football in the Northern Counties East League Division 1 for Knaresborough Town. He plays cricket for Heslington CC in York.
