= Clayton Fortune =

English footballer (born 1982)

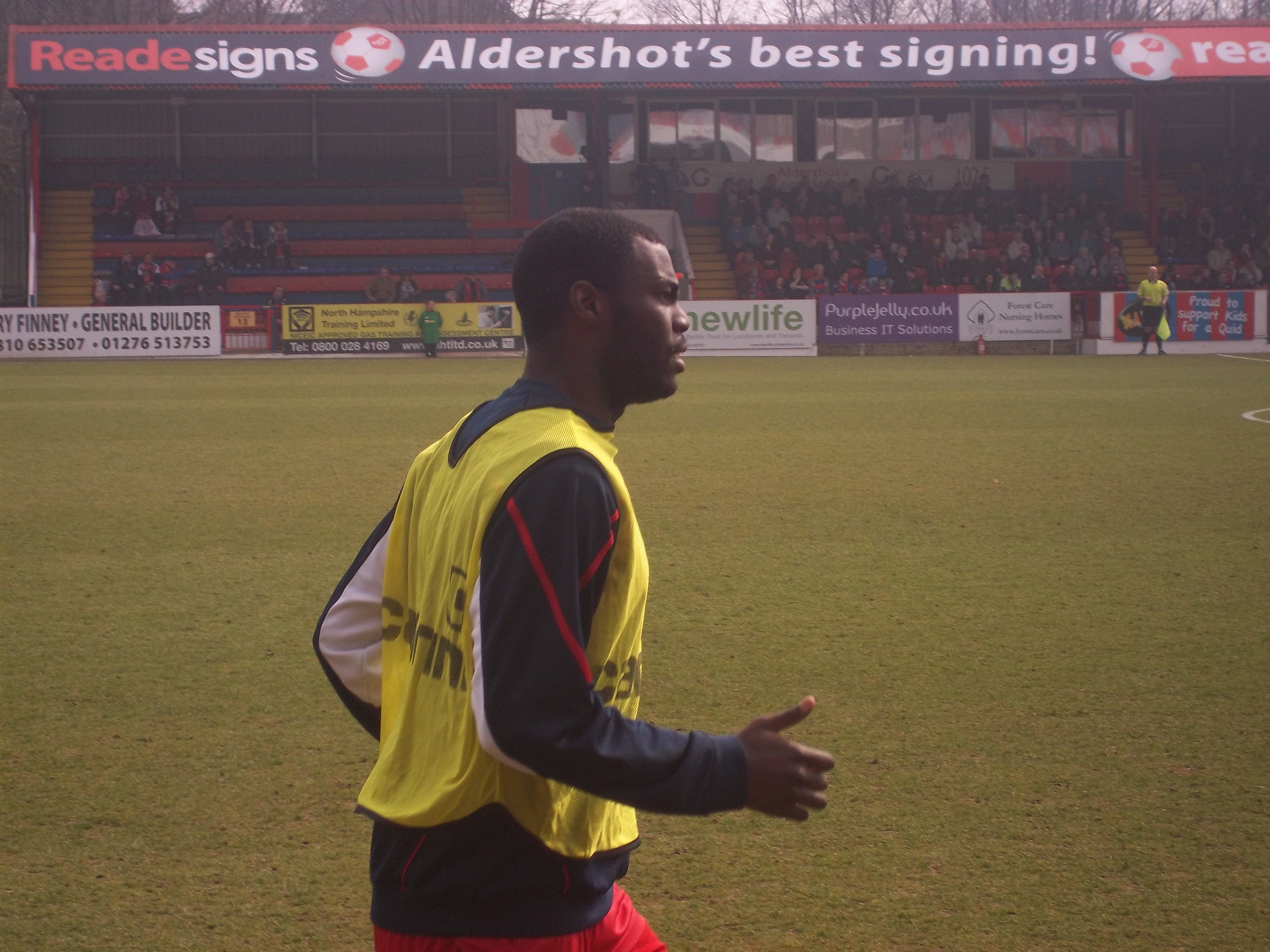
- Fortune pictured in March 2011.

Personal information
- Full name: Clayton Alexander Fortune
- Date of birth: 10 November 1982 (age 44)
- Place of birth: Forest Gate, England
- Height: 6 ft 3 in (1.91 m)
- Positions: Defender; midfielder

Youth career
- 1999–2001: Tottenham Hotspur

Senior career*
Years	Team	Apps	(Gls)
2001–2006	Bristol City	53	(0)
2005–2006	→ Port Vale (loan)	25	(2)
2006–2008	Leyton Orient	10	(0)
2006–2007	→ Port Vale (loan)	13	(0)
2008–2009	Darlington	7	(0)
2008	→ Rushden & Diamonds (loan)	1	(0)
2009–2010	Weston-super-Mare	31	(5)
2010–2011	Aldershot Town	7	(0)
2011	Clevedon Town	2	(0)
2012	Mangotsfield United	5	(0)
2012	Chippenham Town	1	(0)
2012–2014	Clevedon Town	39	(1)
2014–2016	Weston-super-Mare	82	(2)
2016–2017	Hereford		
2018–2020	Mangotsfield United	37	(0)
Total		306	(10)
- * Club domestic league appearances and goals

Clayton Alexander Fortune (born 10 November 1982) is an English former footballer who played as a defender.

Fortune spent the first six years of his career at Bristol City between 2001 and 2006. He then began two years with Leyton Orient before signing with Darlington in the summer of 2008. Between 2005 and 2007, he also enjoyed two lengthy loan spells with Port Vale. He spent the 2009–10 season with Weston-super-Mare, before returning to the English Football League with Aldershot Town for the 2010–11 season. After leaving Clevedon Town, he missed a season of football; he joined Mangotsfield United in June 2012 before switching to Chippenham Town four months later and then making a return to Clevedon Town. He returned to Weston-super-Mare as a player-coach in June 2014, before joining Hereford in November 2016. He helped Hereford to win the Southern League Division One South & West title in 2016–17 and later returned to Mangotsfield United.

== Career ==
Fortune attended St Bonaventure's in Forest Gate, London. He started his career with Tottenham Hotspur, but left for Bristol City, having never appeared for the former. Signing his first professional contract in March 2001, he made his debut on 4 December 2001, replacing Joe Burnell 82 minutes into a 2–1 win over Peterborough United in the Football League Trophy. He became a first regular for the first time in the 2004–05 season, as City finished one point outside the play-offs.

He had a long-term loan spell with Port Vale from November 2005, extended to the end of the season. During this spell he made several man of the match appearances and scored his first professional goals, netting against Blackpool and Walsall. He was named as the club's player of the month for January.

Vale manager Martin Foyle planned to buy Fortune in April 2006 and gave the player the club's Young Player of the Year award. A five-figure fee was agreed with City; however, the deal fell through as he rejected personal terms with the club. He then had trials at both Derby County and Queens Park Rangers. Instead he transferred to Leyton Orient in August 2006, unwanted at City. By November 2006, he found himself back at Vale Park, again on loan until the end of the season.

The 2007–08 season was spent with Orient, however, he missed much of it due to dislocated shoulder and was released upon its conclusion, allowing him to sign with League Two Darlington. He spent November 2008 at Conference side Rushden & Diamonds, making just he once appearances before returning to Darlington. Fortune signed for Conference South side Weston-super-Mare in July 2009. He made a total of 31 appearances, scoring five goals for the club, who narrowly escaped relegation. In July 2010, Fortune signed a one-year contract with Aldershot Town after impressing on trial. He made just three league starts, and was not offered a new contract at the end of the season. He then spent a brief spell with Southern League club Clevedon Town, who were managed by former Vale teammate Mickey Bell.

He signed with Southern League side Mangotsfield United in June 2012, in what was described as a "huge coup for the club". Fortune made his debut for Mangotsfield in a 1–0 home defeat to Cirencester Town on 18 August. On 3 October, he moved up a division to join Chippenham Town, having impressed against the club in an FA Cup clash with Mangotsfield. However, he left the club just four weeks later after playing just two games; manager Nathan Rudge said that he "never really got going with us". He returned to Clevedon Town in November 2012. The "Seasiders" finished 15h in 2012–13 and 17th in 2013–14.

He re-joined former club Weston-super-Mare in June 2014 after manager Mickey Bell appointed him as player-coach. The "Seagulls" finished 17th in 2014–15 and 16th in 2015–16. He served as captain at the start of the 2016–17 season. Still, he was released in November 2016 after new manager Scott Bartlett announced his intention to rebuild the playing squad.

In November 2016, he returned to the Southern League Division One South & West to sign with Hereford, who were managed by former Bristol City teammate Peter Beadle. Despite the "Bulls" winning the 2016–17 title by an 18-point margin, Fortune admitted that he had struggled with injuries throughout the campaign. He was released in May 2017. He rejoined Mangotsfield United for the 2018–19 and 2019–20 seasons.

== Style of play ==
Fortune played primarily a central defender and could also play at left-back or in midfield.

== Personal life ==
His cousin is former Charlton Athletic defender Jonathan Fortune, and his uncle is Leo Fortune-West.

After leaving the professional game as a player, he worked as a football consultant for agency firm Sports Management International.

== Career statistics ==
Appearances and goals by club, season and competition
Club	Season	League			FA Cup		League Cup		Other		Total	
Club	Season	Division	Apps	Goals	Apps	Goals	Apps	Goals	Apps	Goals	Apps	Goals
Bristol City	2001–02	Second Division	1	0	0	0	0	0	1 (Note: Appearance(s) in the EFL Trophy.)	0	2	0
Bristol City	2002–03	Second Division	10	0	0	0	0	0	3	0	13	0
Bristol City	2003–04	Second Division	6	0	0	0	1	0	0	0	7	0
Bristol City	2004–05	League One	30	0	1	0	2	0	2	0	35	0
Bristol City	2005–06	League One	6	0	0	0	1	0	1	0	8	0
Bristol City	Total		53	0	1	0	4	0	7	0	65	0
Port Vale (loan)	2005–06	League One	25	2	4	0	—		0	0	29	2
Leyton Orient	2006–07	League One	9	0	0	0	1	0	0	0	10	0
Leyton Orient	2007–08	League One	1	0	0	0	0	0	0	0	1	0
Leyton Orient	Total		10	0	0	0	1	0	0	0	11	0
Port Vale (loan)	2006–07	League One	13	0	1	0	—		1	0	15	0
Darlington	2008–09	League Two	7	0	0	0	0	0	0	0	7	0
Rushden & Diamonds (loan)	2008–09	Conference National	1	0	0	0	—		1 (Note: Appearance(s) in the Northamptonshire Senior Cup.)	0	2	0
Weston-super-Mare	2009–10	Conference South	31	5	0	0	—		0	0	31	5
Aldershot Town	2010–11	League Two	7	0	1	0	1	0	2	0	11	0
Clevedon Town	2011–12	Southern League; Division One South & West	2	0	1	0	—		0	0	3	0
Mangotsfield United	2012–13	Southern League; Division One South & West	5	0	2	0	—		2	0	9	0
Chippenham Town	2012–13	Southern League; Premier Division	1	0	0	0	—		1 (Note: Appearance(s) in the Southern League Cup)	0	2	0
Clevedon Town	2012–13	Southern League; Division One South & West	22	1	0	0	—		0	0	22	1
Clevedon Town	2013–14	Southern League; Division One South & West	15	0	5	1	—		4 (Note: 3 appearances in the FA Trophy and 1 appearance in the Southern League Cup.)	0	24	1
Clevedon Town	Total		37	1	5	1	0	0	4	0	46	2
Mangotsfield United	2013–14	Southern League; Division One South & West	8	0	0	0	—		1 (Note: Appearance(s) in the Gloucestershire Senior Cup.)	0	9	0
Weston-super-Mare	2014–15	Conference South	34	1	2	0	—		0	0	36	1
Weston-super-Mare	2015–16	National League South	34	1	1	0	—		2 (Note: Appearance(s) in the FA Trophy.)	0	37	1
Weston-super-Mare	2016–17	National League South	14	0	0	0	—		0	0	14	0
Weston-super-Mare	Total		82	2	3	0	0	0	0	0	87	2
Mangotsfield United	2018–19	Southern League; Division One South	23	0	0	0	—		3	1	26	1
Mangotsfield United	2019–20	Southern League; Division One South	1	0	0	0	—		0	0	1	0
Mangotsfield United	Total		24	0	0	0	0	0	3	1	27	1
Career total (Note: Statistics for Hereford not recorded.)			306	10	18	1	6	0	24	1	354	12

== Honours ==
Hereford

- Southern League Division One South & West: 2016–17
