= Michael Husbands =

English footballer (born 1983)

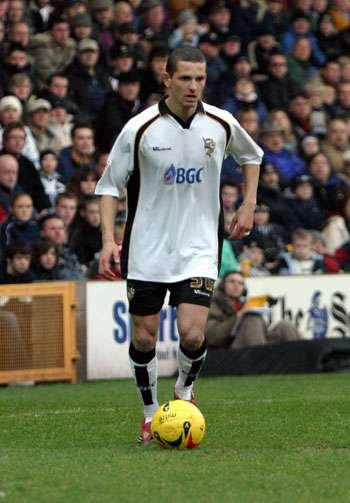
- Husbands playing for Port Vale in 2008

Personal information
- Full name: Michael Paul Husbands
- Date of birth: 13 November 1983 (age 42)
- Place of birth: Birmingham, England
- Height: 5 ft 9 in (1.75 m)
- Positions: Winger; forward

Youth career
- 1998–2002: Aston Villa

Senior career*
Years	Team	Apps	(Gls)
2002–2003	Aston Villa	0	(0)
2002–2003	→ Hereford United (loan)	5	(0)
2003–2005	Southend United	11	(0)
2005	Bristol Rovers	0	(0)
2005	Walsall	4	(0)
2005–2007	Port Vale	47	(5)
2007–2008	Macclesfield Town	2	(0)
2007–2008	→ AFC Telford United (loan)	25	(3)
2008	Oxford United	2	(0)
2012–201?	Redditch United		
- * Club domestic league appearances and goals

Michael Paul Husbands (born 13 November 1983) is an English footballer who plays as a winger and forward.

He began his professional football career with Aston Villa in 2002. He was loaned out to Hereford United before signing with Southend United in 2003. In 2005, he moved to Port Vale via Bristol Rovers and Walsall. After two seasons with Vale, he joined Macclesfield Town. There, he was loaned out to Telford United before finishing his career with Oxford United in 2008. He was an Elite Commando in the Royal Marines. He accepted a call-up from the Saint Lucia national team in September 2012. He returned to club football with Redditch United in December 2012.

== Club career ==
Husbands, a forward, began his career at Aston Villa as an associated schoolboy in 1998, and he was a member of the FA Youth Cup winning team of 2001–02. He had a trial at Macclesfield Town before he joined Hereford United on loan in December 2002, he made five substitute appearances over his two months at Edgar Street.

He was allowed to join Southend United in July 2003; he spent two years at the club but played only 16 games due to several injuries, including a pelvic problem. In August 2005 he joined Bristol Rovers for a short spell on a non-contract basis before moving on to Walsall the next month and then Port Vale – initially on trial – in October 2005. Husbands made 47 league appearances for the "Valiants". The highlight of his time at Vale Park was on 26 September 2006 against Nottingham Forest, he scored within 14 seconds – the fastest goal of that season.

He was released by Port Vale in July 2007, and joined Macclesfield Town, where he became Ian Brightwell's first signing as manager. He joined Telford United of the Conference North on a one-month loan in November, which was extended by a month after he impressed at New Bucks Head, before the loan was eventually extended until the end of the season. Husbands made 25 appearances for the Shropshire side scoring three times. He rejected the opportunity to sign permanently at the end of the campaign and so after a trial at Cheltenham Town in July, he opted to join Oxford United in the Conference National in August 2008. Manager Darren Patterson urged him to make the most of this opportunity, saying, "For whatever reason he's had lots of clubs, but you can see his sharpness. Maybe this is the last chance saloon for Michael. He needs a club where he plays regularly and scores goals." However, he was released by Oxford at the end of the month after his contract expired.

After leaving the professional game, Husbands joined the Royal Marines. He made his debut for the Marines football team against the Devon & Somerset Fire Service on 18 May 2010, scoring twice in the game.

In December 2012, he returned to English football with Southern League club Redditch United.

== International career ==
Husbands is of Saint Lucian descent, but for many years chose not to represent Saint Lucia in international competitions. He finally accepted a call-up. He was named to their squad for the 2012 Caribbean Cup qualification. He had not played professionally for over four years, though had remained fit as he was serving in the Royal Marines. He did not end up featuring at the qualification stage, and Saint Lucia did not qualify.

== Career statistics ==
Appearances and goals by club, season and competition
Club	Season	League			FA Cup		League Cup		Other		Total	
Club	Season	Division	Apps	Goals	Apps	Goals	Apps	Goals	Apps	Goals	Apps	Goals
Hereford United (loan)	2002–03	Conference National	5	0	0	0	—		0	0	5	0
Southend United	2003–04	Third Division	9	0	2	0	1	0	2 (Note: Appearance(s) in the EFL Trophy.)	0	14	0
Southend United	2004–05	League Two	2	0	0	0	0	0	0	0	2	0
Southend United	Total		11	0	2	0	1	0	2	0	16	0
Bristol Rovers	2005–06	League Two	0	0	0	0	0	0	0	0	0	0
Walsall	2005–06	League One	4	0	0	0	0	0	0	0	4	0
Port Vale	2005–06	League One	24	4	5	1	—		1	0	30	5
Port Vale	2006–07	League One	23	1	0	0	3	0	1	0	27	1
Port Vale	Total		47	5	5	1	3	0	2	0	57	6
Macclesfield Town	2007–08	League Two	2	0	0	0	1	0	0	0	3	0
AFC Telford United (loan)	2007–08	Conference North	25	3	0	0	—		0	0	25	3
Oxford United	2008–09	Conference National	2	0	0	0	—		0	0	2	0
Career total			96	8	7	1	5	0	4	0	112	9

== Honours ==
Aston Villa

- FA Youth Cup: 2002
