= 2005–06 Port Vale F.C. season =

Port Vale F.C.
2005–06 season
- Owner: Valiant 2001
- Chairman: Bill Bratt
- Manager: Martin Foyle
- Stadium: Vale Park
- Football League One: 13th (60 points)
- FA Cup: Fifth Round (eliminated by Aston Villa)
- League Cup: First Round (eliminated by Rotherham United)
- Football League Trophy: Second Round (eliminated by Hereford United)
- Player of the Year: George Pilkington
- Top goalscorer: League: Leon Constantine, Micky Cummins (10 each); All: Leon Constantine (12)
- Highest home attendance: 6,793 vs. Nottingham Forest, 18 February 2006
- Lowest home attendance: 3,452 vs. Milton Keynes Dons, 4 April 2006
- Average home league attendance: 4,666
- Biggest win: 3–0 vs. Huddersfield Town, 28 December 2005
- Biggest defeat: 0–3 (twice)
Home colours	Away colours

The 2005–06 season was Port Vale's 94th season of football in the English Football League, and second-successive season in League One. Under manager Martin Foyle, the club delivered a mid‑table campaign, finishing 13th with 60 points, after 16 wins, 12 draws and 18 defeats, and netting 49 goals while conceding 54. Foyle's recruitment of striker Leon Constantine helped bolster the attack, though the sales of Sam Collins and Billy Paynter dampened promotion ambitions.

Cup competition results were mixed. Vale made a spirited FA Cup run to the Fourth Round, where they were eliminated 3–1 by Premier League side Aston Villa, generating crucial income and fan interest. They exited the League Cup at the First Round to Rotherham United and bowed out of the Football League Trophy in the Second Round, losing to Hereford United. Off the pitch, the club made significant financial strides. Operating losses were dramatically reduced from £500,000 to just £50,000, though the club took out a £2.25 million council loan, incurring monthly repayments of around £19,000. A major record shirt‑sponsorship deal was secured with BGC Gas, and celebrity fan Robbie Williams purchased £240,000 worth of shares — helping stabilise ownership under the Valiant 2001 consortium led by chairman Bill Bratt, with George Pilkington named Player of the Year and Leon Constantine top scorer with 12 in all competitions.

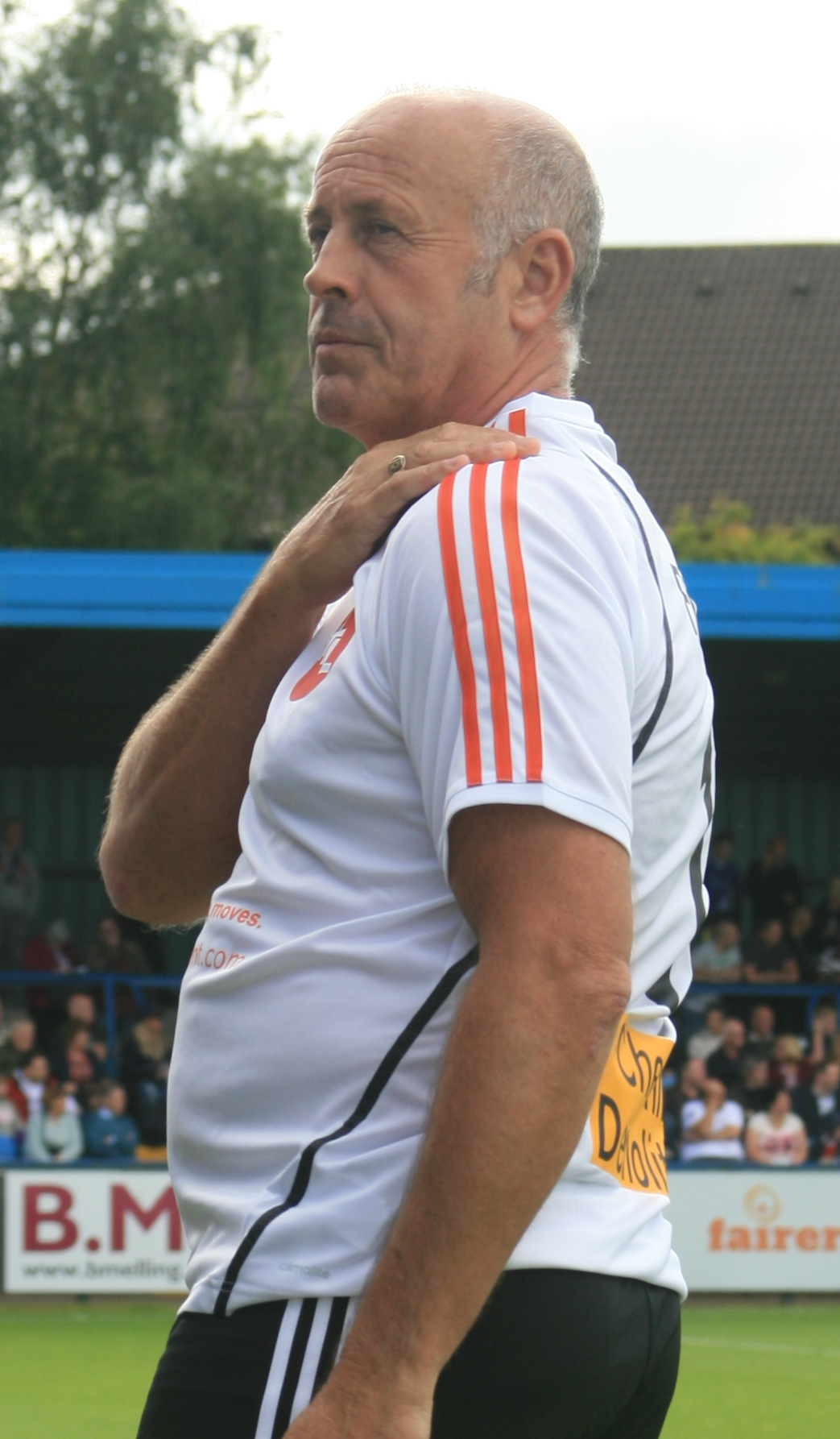
Manager Martin Foyle.

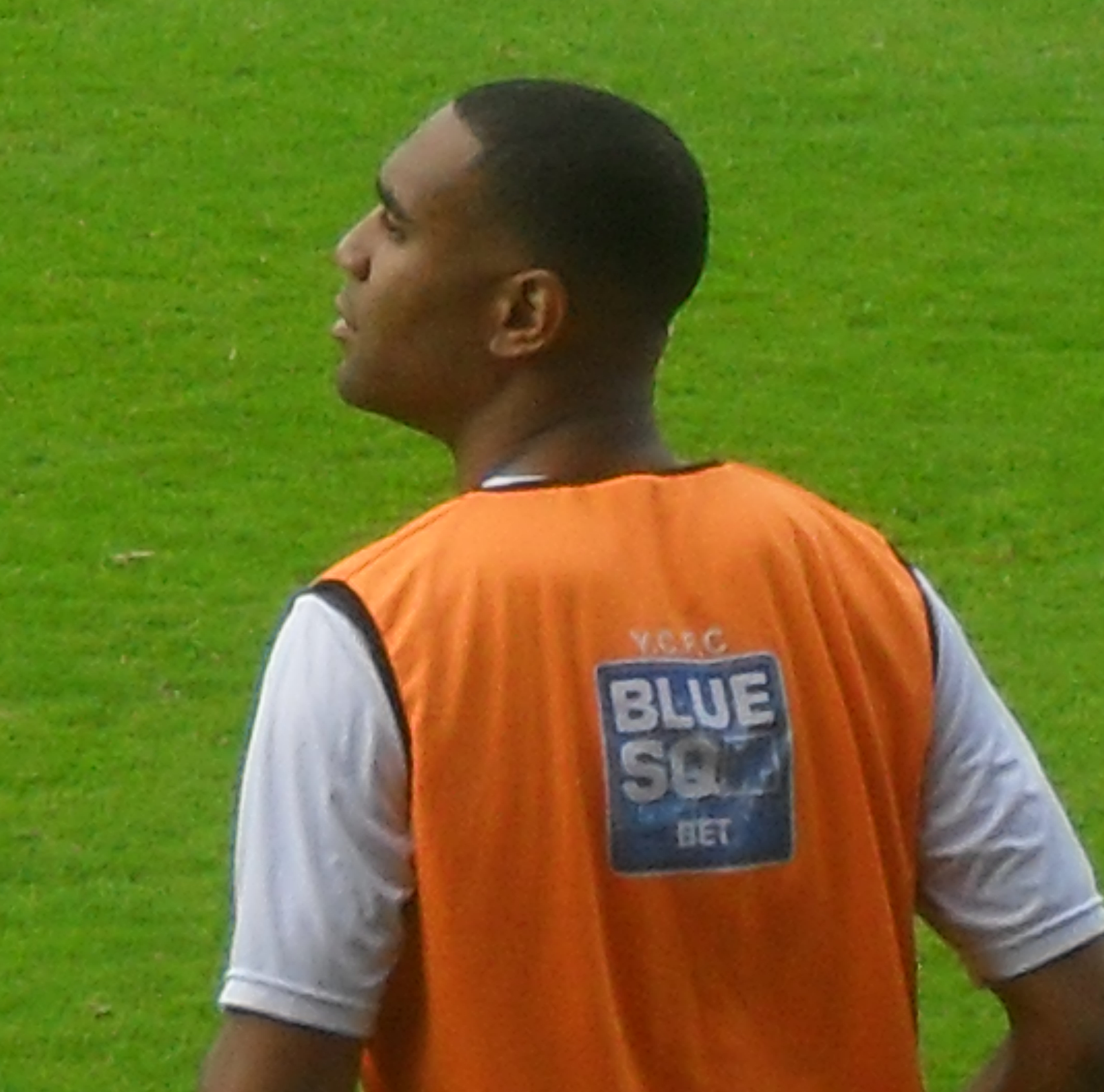
Top scorer Leon Constantine.

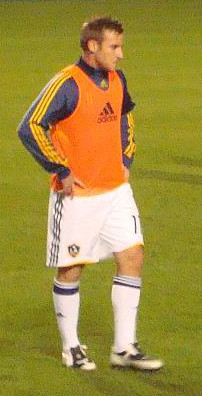
Winger Chris Birchall had another solid season.

== Overview ==
=== League One ===
The pre-season saw Martin Foyle sign Micky Bell and Hector Sam on free transfers from Bristol City and Wrexham respectively. He also took in promising young striker Chris Cornes on loan from Wolverhampton Wanderers, who would impress in a Vale shirt.

The season started with 14 points from seven games to launch the club's promotion bid. After three defeats, the Vale entered a long period of inconsistent form. In September, Darrell Clarke joined on loan from Hartlepool United, though he would play just the one game for the club. Gary Mulligan also arrived on loan from Sheffield United, and would find greater success in Burslem. The next month Foyle added to the squad by signing Michael Husbands from Walsall. Vale lost 1–0 to Yeovil Town, who had Steve Thompson in his first match in caretaker charge and suummer signing Matt Harrold scoring his first goal for the club.

In November, Sam Togwell joined on loan from Scunthorpe United in an initial six-week deal that was extended until the end of the season. Another long-term loan deal was struck with Leyton Orient for big defender Clayton Fortune, who would later turn down a permanent transfer to Vale Park after failing to agree on personal terms. Foyle also made possibly the best signing of his spell in charge at Vale, bringing striker Leon Constantine in from Torquay United for a £20,000 fee. However, Foyle lost two big players, when key defender Sam Collins and promising striker Billy Paynter were sold to Hull City for £65,000 and £150,000 respectively, the pair leaving on loan deals until the January transfer window (when they would leave permanently). The club had previously threatened to report Plymouth Argyle to the FA after an alleged illegal approach for the duo. Four straight defeats followed this, emphasising the sales' effect on the club's promotion bid.

In January, Bell moved on to Cheltenham Town, and Hector Sam joined Walsall. In came Jason Talbot on loan from Mansfield Town, who joined the club permanently at the end of the season. Foyle also signed defender Mark McGregor from Blackpool, and midfielder Sean Doherty from ADO Den Haag. Vale avenged their loss to Yeovil by winning one goal to nil at home. A sequence of two points in five games killed off the Vale's promotion hopes by April.

They finished in 13th place with sixty points, some distance from promotion and relegation. Only the four relegated teams scored fewer goals than Vale, and Constantine was the club's top-scorer with twelve goals, closely followed by Cummins with eleven.

At the end of the season nine players departed the club: Lee Matthews (Crewe Alexandra); Hector Sam (Walsall); Steve Rowland (Southport); Tony Dinning (Stockport County); Micky Cummins (Darlington); Jonny Brain (Macclesfield Town); Mark Innes (Hyde United); Sean Doherty (Accrington Stanley); and Craig James (Darlington). Andy Porter retired to concentrate on his coaching. With Dinning's departure, George Pilkington was appointed club captain. World Cup international winger Chris Birchall was also sold to Coventry City for £325,000.

=== Finances ===
On the financial side, Bill Bratt's cost-cutting measures had reduced the club's operating losses from £500,000 to £50,000. Despite this, the club took out a £2.25 million loan from the local council, with monthly repayments of around £19,000. Bratt continued to try and woo elderly North American millionaires, but Steve Stavro did not follow up his initial interest with any investment. In October 2005, the club turned down an investment group that wished to appoint Paul Gascoigne as manager. Foyle said "We need a cup run, or an investor, to give us a kick-start because we aren't doing too badly". He got his wish with an expected income of £250,000 from the Villa game. In February, lifelong fan Robbie Williams bought £240,000 of the £250,000 worth of available shares in the club. In April, the club announced a new record-breaking shirt sponsorship deal with BGC Gas. The club also announced Bill Bratt would now be a paid chief executive.

=== Cup competitions ===
In the FA Cup, Vale advanced past Wrexham to reach a second round encounter with Bristol Rovers. A late equaliser from Constantine earned Vale a replay, and a Chris Birchall strike gave the "Valiants" victory at the Memorial Stadium. They then made it to the fourth round after a 2–1 win over Doncaster Rovers thanks to a brace from loanee Sam Togwell. They faced a trip to Villa Park to face Premier League Aston Villa, where they were defeated 3–1 after a brace from Milan Baroš. A 7,500 strong contingent of Vale fans travelled to see the game and reworked the song (Is This the Way to) Amarillo into "Show me the way to Aston Villa" to mark the occasion. This was the club's largest away following in 15 years.

In the League Cup, Vale were knocked out 3–1 by Rotherham United at the Don Valley Stadium, with Hector Sam breaking his leg during the game.

In the Football League Trophy, Vale received a bye in the first round, but in the second round were embarrassed to lose 2–1 to Conference club Hereford United at Edgar Street, after a Tamika Mkandawire header in extra time.

== Results ==
=== Football League One ===
==== League table ====
Pos	Team	Pld	W	D	L	GF	GA	GD	Pts
11	Bradford City	46	14	19	13	51	49	+2	61
12	Scunthorpe United	46	15	15	16	68	73	−5	60
13	Port Vale	46	16	12	18	49	54	−5	60
14	Gillingham	46	16	12	18	50	64	−14	60
15	Yeovil Town	46	15	11	20	54	62	−8	56

Rules for classification: 1) Points; 2) Goal difference; 3) Goals scored

==== Results by matchday ====
Round	1	2	3	4	5	6	7	8	9	10	11	12	13	14	15	16	17	18	19	20	21	22	23	24	25	26	27	28	29	30	31	32	33	34	35	36	37	38	39	40	41	42	43	44	45	46
Ground	A	H	H	A	H	A	H	A	H	A	H	H	A	H	A	H	A	H	H	A	A	H	H	A	H	A	A	H	A	A	H	A	H	A	H	A	A	H	A	H	H	A	H	A	H	A
Result	W	D	W	L	W	D	W	L	L	L	D	W	W	L	W	L	L	D	W	L	L	L	L	W	L	D	D	W	L	W	W	D	L	W	L	D	L	D	L	W	W	D	D	L	W	D
Position	6	4	2	7	4	5	3	7	8	12	10	5	5	6	5	8	12	11	8	11	14	16	17	14	14	16	16	12	14	13	9	9	11	11	11	12	14	15	15	15	11	14	13	15	13	13
Points	3	4	7	7	10	11	14	14	14	14	15	18	21	21	24	24	24	25	28	28	28	28	28	31	31	32	33	36	36	39	42	43	43	46	46	47	47	48	48	51	54	55	56	56	59	60

Source: Statto
A = Away; H = Home; W = Win; D = Draw; L = Loss

==== Matches ====
6 August 2005 1	Southend United	1–2	Port Vale	Southend-on-Sea
	Gray 72'	Report	Lowndes 12', 28'	Stadium: Roots Hall; Attendance: 6,543; Referee: Carl Boyeson

9 August 2005 2	Port Vale	0–0	Gillingham	Burslem
		Report		Stadium: Vale Park; Attendance: 4,931; Referee: Graham Salisbury

15 August 2005 3	Port Vale	1–0	Brentford	Burslem
	Cummins 53'	Report		Stadium: Vale Park; Attendance: 4,275; Referee: Colin Webster

20 August 2005 4	Bristol City	4–2	Port Vale	Ashton Gate, Bristol
	Brooker 4', 28'; Stewart 7'; Murray 14'	Report	Lowndes 35'; Bell 40'	Stadium: Ashton Gate; Attendance: 11,120; Referee: Mick Fletcher

27 August 2005 5	Port Vale	2–0	Doncaster Rovers	Burslem
	Lowndes 30'; Dinning 48'	Report		Stadium: Vale Park; Attendance: 4,993; Referee: Phil Joslin

29 August 2005 6	Milton Keynes Dons	0–0	Port Vale	Milton Keynes
15:00 BST		Report		Stadium: Stadium MK; Attendance: 4,592; Referee: Keith Hill

3 September 2005 7	Port Vale	2–0	Rotherham United	Burslem
13:30 BST	Lowndes 45'; Paynter 90'	Report		Stadium: Vale Park; Attendance: 4,528; Referee: Gary Lewis

10 September 2005 8	Scunthorpe United	2–0	Port Vale	Scunthorpe
	Hinds 32'; Keogh 37'	Report		Stadium: Glanford Park; Attendance: 5,694; Referee: Brian Curson

17 September 2005 9	Port Vale	0–1	Colchester United	Burslem
		Report	Iwelumo 34'	Stadium: Vale Park; Attendance: 5,166; Referee: Colin Webster

24 September 2005 10	Yeovil Town	1–0	Port Vale	Yeovil
	Harrold 85'	Report		Stadium: Huish Park; Attendance: 5,901; Referee: Trevor Parkes

28 September 2005 11	Port Vale	2–2	Oldham Athletic	Burslem
	Cornes 71', 90'	Report	Beckett 15'; Killen 81'	Stadium: Vale Park; Attendance: 3,796; Referee: Eddie Ilderton

1 October 2005 12	Port Vale	3–2	Walsall	Burslem
	Birchall 8'; Mulligan 55'; Cornes 72'	Report	Collins 24' (og.); Demontagnac 36'	Stadium: Vale Park; Attendance: 5,314; Referee: Scott Mathieson

8 October 2005 13	Swindon Town	1–2	Port Vale	Swindon
13:00 BST	Fallon 24'	Report	Bell 44'; Cornes 53'	Stadium: County Ground; Attendance: 4,531; Referee: Paul Melin

15 October 2005 14	Port Vale	0–1	Bradford City	Burslem
		Report	Claridge 64'	Stadium: Vale Park; Attendance: 4,892; Referee: Paul Robinson

22 October 2005 15	AFC Bournemouth	1–2	Port Vale	Bournemouth
	Surman 23'	Report	Cummins 75'; Paynter 86'	Stadium: Dean Court; Attendance: 6,320; Referee: Steve Tanner

29 October 2005 16	Port Vale	1–2	Hartlepool United	Burslem
	Cummins 43'	Report	Williams 12'; Butler 64'	Stadium: Vale Park; Attendance: 4,550; Referee: Lee Probert

12 November 2005 17	Chesterfield	2–0	Port Vale	Chesterfield, Derbyshire
	Allison 31', 67'	Report		Stadium: Saltergate; Attendance: 4,714; Referee: Jon Moss

19 November 2005 18	Port Vale	1–1	Swindon Town	Burslem
	Husbands 87'	Report	Bouazza 66'	Stadium: Vale Park; Attendance: 4,108; Referee: Rob Styles

26 November 2005 19	Port Vale	2–1	Southend United	Burslem
	Constantine 18'; Husbands 55'	Report	Smith 90'	Stadium: Vale Park; Attendance: 3,961; Referee: Tony Leake

6 December 2005 20	Nottingham Forest	1–0	Port Vale	Nottingham
	Tyson 31'	Report		Stadium: City Ground; Attendance: 17,696; Referee: Neil Swarbrick

10 December 2005 21	Gillingham	3–0	Port Vale	Gillingham, Kent
	Harris 41'; Jarvis 66', 82'	Report		Stadium: Priestfield Stadium; Attendance: 6,210; Referee: Keith Stroud

17 December 2005 22	Port Vale	0–1	Bristol City	Burslem
		Report	Brooker 45'	Stadium: Vale Park; Attendance: 4,214; Referee: Darren Deadman

26 December 2005 23	Port Vale	1–2	Blackpool	Burslem
	Fortune 58'	Report	Wiles 52'; Parker 54'	Stadium: Vale Park; Attendance: 5,666; Referee: Mick Russell

28 December 2005 24	Huddersfield Town	0–3	Port Vale	Huddersfield
		Report	Constantine 48', 65'; Dinning 80' (pen.)	Stadium: Kirklees Stadium; Attendance: 10,824; Referee: Andy Woolmer

31 December 2005 25	Port Vale	0–2	Tranmere Rovers	Burslem
14:00 GMT		Report	Harrison 8'; Greenacre 90'	Stadium: Vale Park; Attendance: 4,489; Referee: Carl Boyeson

2 January 2006 26	Swansea City	0–0	Port Vale	Swansea
		Report		Stadium: Liberty Stadium; Attendance: 14,747; Referee: Paul Melin

10 January 2006 27	Rotherham United	1–1	Port Vale	Rotherham
	Hoskins 26'	Report	Husbands 7'	Stadium: Millmoor; Attendance: 3,883; Referee: Eddie Ilderton

14 January 2006 28	Port Vale	3–2	Barnsley	Burslem
	Sonner 24'; Constantine 27'; Togwell 73'	Report	Burns 56'; Carbon 67'	Stadium: Vale Park; Attendance: 4,468; Referee: Gary Sutton

21 January 2006 29	Colchester United	2–1	Port Vale	Colchester
	Garcia 74', 87'	Report	Husbands 79' (pen.)	Stadium: Layer Road; Attendance: 4,316; Referee: Phil Joslin

4 February 2006 30	Oldham Athletic	0–1	Port Vale	Oldham
		Report	Constantine 44'	Stadium: Boundary Park; Attendance: 5,555; Referee: Mike Jones

11 February 2006 31	Port Vale	1–0	Yeovil Town	Burslem
	Constantine 52'	Report		Stadium: Vale Park; Attendance: 4,732; Referee: Clive Oliver

14 February 2006 32	Barnsley	1–1	Port Vale	Barnsley
	Hayes 56'	Report	Cummins 84'	Stadium: Oakwell; Attendance: 7,709; Referee: Jarnail Singh

18 February 2006 33	Port Vale	0–2	Nottingham Forest	Burslem
		Report	Commons 40'; Tyson 90'	Stadium: Vale Park; Attendance: 6,793; Referee: Paul Taylor

25 February 2006 34	Brentford	0–1	Port Vale	Brentford, West London
		Report	Smith 36'	Stadium: Griffin Park; Attendance: 7,542; Referee: Grant Hegley

28 February 2006 35	Port Vale	1–2	Scunthorpe United	Burslem
	Cummins 18'	Report	Sparrow 11'; Taylor 59'	Stadium: Vale Park; Attendance: 3,984; Referee: Russell Booth

11 March 2006 36	Doncaster Rovers	1–1	Port Vale	Doncaster
	Fortune-West 58'	Report	Constantine 86'	Stadium: Belle Vue; Attendance: 5,511; Referee: Scott Mathieson

18 March 2006 37	Blackpool	1–0	Port Vale	Blackpool
	Williams 66'	Report		Stadium: Bloomfield Road; Attendance: 5,494; Referee: Mike Jones

25 March 2006 38	Port Vale	1–1	Huddersfield Town	Burslem
	Cummins 59'	Report	Booth 81'	Stadium: Vale Park; Attendance: 5,664; Referee: Graham Laws

31 March 2006 39	Tranmere Rovers	3–0	Port Vale	Prenton
	Zola 28'; O'Leary 58'; Davies 78'	Report		Stadium: Prenton Park; Attendance: 6,926; Referee: Nigel Miller

4 April 2006 40	Port Vale	3–1	Milton Keynes Dons	Burslem
	Constantine 13', 35' (pen.); Cummins 45'	Report	Platt 28'	Stadium: Vale Park; Attendance: 3,452; Referee: Paul Robinson

8 April 2006 41	Port Vale	3–2	Swansea City	Burslem
	Togwell 43'; Cummins 58'; Constantine 63'	Report	Akinfenwa 47'; Fallon 88'	Stadium: Vale Park; Attendance: 4,850; Referee: Brian Curson

15 April 2006 42	Walsall	1–1	Port Vale	Walsall
	Constable 50'	Report	Fortune 86'	Stadium: Bescot Stadium; Attendance: 4,876; Referee: Chris Foy

17 April 2006 43	Port Vale	0–0	AFC Bournemouth	Burslem
		Report		Stadium: Vale Park; Attendance: 4,006; Referee: Trevor Parkes

22 April 2006 44	Bradford City	1–0	Port Vale	Bradford
	Bower 44'	Report		Stadium: Valley Parade; Attendance: 7,139; Referee: Gary Lewis

29 April 2006 45	Port Vale	3–1	Chesterfield	Burslem
	Pilkington 5', 15'; Cummins 81'	Report	O'Hara 3'	Stadium: Vale Park; Attendance: 4,478; Referee: Lee Probert

5

6 May 2006 46	Hartlepool United	1–1	Port Vale	Hartlepool
	Brown 86'	Report	Cummins 77'	Stadium: Victoria Park; Attendance: 6,895; Referee: Russell Booth

=== FA Cup ===
4 November 2005 R1	Port Vale	2–1	Wrexham	Burslem
	Husbands 20'; Constantine 65'	Report	McEvilly 63'	Stadium: Vale Park; Attendance: 5,046; Referee: Darren Deadman

2 December 2005 R2	Port Vale	1–1	Bristol Rovers	Burslem
	Constantine 86'	Report	Gibb 55'	Stadium: Vale Park; Attendance: 4,483; Referee: Scott Mathieson

13 December 2005 Replay	Bristol Rovers	0–1	Port Vale	Bristol
		Report	Birchall 22'	Stadium: Memorial Stadium; Attendance: 5,623; Referee: Paul Armstrong

6 January 2006 R3	Port Vale	2–1	Doncaster Rovers	Burslem
	Togwell 55', 73'	Report	Heffernan 27'	Stadium: Vale Park; Attendance: 4,923; Referee: Clive Penton

28 January 2006 R4	Aston Villa	3–1	Port Vale	Birmingham
	Baroš 70', 74'; Davis 90'	Report	Lowndes 85'	Stadium: Villa Park; Attendance: 30,434; Referee: Steve Bennett

=== League Cup ===
23 August 2005 R1	Rotherham United	3–1	Port Vale	Rotherham
	Rowland 41' (og.); Burton 71'; Otsemobor 90'	Report	Cummins 45'	Stadium: Millmoor; Attendance: 2,809; Referee: Clive Oliver

=== Football League Trophy ===
22 November 2005 R2	Hereford United	2–1 (a.e.t.)	Port Vale	Hereford
	Carey-Bertram 14'; Mkandawire 102'	Report	Smith 45'	Stadium: Edgar Street; Attendance: 1,355; Referee: Andy Penn

== Squad statistics ==
=== Appearances and goals ===
Key to positions: GK – Goalkeeper; DF – Defender; MF – Midfielder; FW – Forward

No.	Pos	Nat	Player	Total		League One		FA Cup		League Cup		Football League Trophy	
No.	Pos	Nat	Player	Apps	Goals	Apps	Goals	Apps	Goals	Apps	Goals	Apps	Goals
1	GK	(England) ENG	Mark Goodlad	52	0	46	0	5	0	1	0	0	0
2	DF	(England) ENG	George Pilkington	53	2	46	2	5	0	1	0	1	0
3	DF	(England) ENG	Craig James	42	0	35	0	5	0	1	0	1	0
4	MF	(England) ENG	Danny Sonner	33	1	29	1	2	0	1	0	1	0
5	DF	(England) ENG	Michael Walsh	4	0	4	0	0	0	0	0	0	0
6	DF	(England) ENG	Clayton Fortune	29	2	25	2	4	0	0	0	0	0
7	FW	(England) ENG	Lee Matthews	3	0	3	0	0	0	0	0	0	0
8	MF	(Republic of Ireland) IRL	Micky Cummins	42	11	39	10	2	0	1	1	0	0
9	FW	(England) ENG	Nathan Lowndes	41	6	35	5	4	1	1	0	1	0
10	MF	(England) ENG	Sean Doherty	7	0	6	0	1	0	0	0	0	0
11	MF	(England) ENG	Jeff Smith	30	2	27	1	2	0	0	0	1	1
12	MF	(England) ENG	Tony Dinning	41	2	35	2	4	0	1	0	1	0
14	MF	(England) ENG	Robin Hulbert	1	0	1	0	0	0	0	0	0	0
15	DF	(Nigeria) NGR	George Abbey	22	0	20	0	1	0	1	0	0	0
16	DF	(Wales) WAL	Steve Rowland	24	0	18	0	4	0	1	0	1	0
17	MF	(Trinidad and Tobago) TTO	Chris Birchall	35	2	31	1	3	1	1	0	0	0
18	DF	(Scotland) SCO	Mark Innes	29	0	23	0	5	0	0	0	1	0
20	DF	(England) ENG	Jason Talbot	5	0	5	0	0	0	0	0	0	0
21	MF	(England) ENG	Joe Cardle	7	0	6	0	0	0	0	0	1	0
22	MF	(England) ENG	Daniel Holmes	0	0	0	0	0	0	0	0	0	0
23	FW	(Trinidad and Tobago) TTO	Hector Sam	5	0	4	0	0	0	1	0	0	0
24	GK	(England) ENG	Jonny Brain	1	0	0	0	0	0	0	0	1	0
25	GK	(England) ENG	Joe Anyon	0	0	0	0	0	0	0	0	0	0
26	MF	(England) ENG	Andy Porter	4	0	2	0	2	0	0	0	0	0
27	DF	(England) ENG	Mark McGregor	14	0	14	0	0	0	0	0	0	0
28	DF	(England) ENG	Luke Prosser	0	0	0	0	0	0	0	0	0	0
30	FW	(Saint Lucia) LCA	Michael Husbands	30	5	24	4	5	1	0	0	1	0
33	FW	(England) ENG	Leon Constantine	35	12	30	10	5	2	0	0	0	0
34	DF	(England) ENG	Sam Togwell	30	4	27	2	2	2	0	0	1	0
35	MF	(England) ENG	Louis Briscoe	4	0	4	0	0	0	0	0	0	0
36	MF	(England) ENG	Christian Smith	0	0	0	0	0	0	0	0	0	0
Players who featured but departed the club during the season:
6	DF	(England) ENG	Sam Collins	16	0	15	0	0	0	1	0	0	0
10	FW	(England) ENG	Billy Paynter	17	2	16	2	0	0	1	0	0	0
19	FW	(Republic of Ireland) IRL	Gary Mulligan	12	1	10	1	1	0	0	0	1	0
20	DF	(England) ENG	Micky Bell	18	2	15	2	2	0	1	0	0	0
27	FW	(England) ENG	Chris Cornes	11	4	10	4	0	0	0	0	1	0
29	MF	(England) ENG	Darrell Clarke	1	0	1	0	0	0	0	0	0	0

=== Top scorers ===
Place	Position	Nation	Number	Name	League One	FA Cup	League Cup	Football League Trophy	Total
1	FW	England	33	Leon Constantine	10	2	0	0	12
2	MF	Ireland	8	Micky Cummins	10	0	1	0	11
3	FW	England	9	Nathan Lowndes	5	1	0	0	6
4	FW	Saint Lucia	30	Michael Husbands	4	1	0	0	5
5	FW	England	27	Chris Cornes	4	0	0	0	4
–	DF	England	34	Sam Togwell	2	2	0	0	4
7	DF	England	2	George Pilkington	2	0	0	0	2
–	FW	England	10	Billy Paynter	2	0	0	0	2
–	MF	England	12	Tony Dinning	2	0	0	0	2
–	MF	Trinidad	17	Chris Birchall	1	1	0	0	2
–	MF	England	11	Jeff Smith	1	0	0	1	2
–	DF	England	20	Micky Bell	2	0	0	0	2
–	DF	England	6	Clayton Fortune	2	0	0	0	2
14	MF	England	4	Danny Sonner	1	0	0	0	1
–	FW	Ireland	19	Gary Mulligan	1	0	0	0	1
				TOTALS	49	7	1	1	58

== Transfers ==
=== Transfers in ===
Date from	Position	Nationality	Name	From	Fee	Ref.
May 2005	MF	ENG	Tony Dinning	Bristol City	Free transfer	
June 2005	FW	TRI	Hector Sam	Wrexham	Free transfer	
June 2005	MF	NIR	Danny Sonner	Peterborough United	Free transfer	
July 2005	DF	ENG	Micky Bell	Bristol City	Free transfer	
October 2005	FW	Saint Lucia	Michael Husbands	Walsall	Free transfer	
January 2006	FW	ENG	Leon Constantine	Torquay United	£20,000	
January 2006	MF	ENG	Sean Doherty	(Netherlands) ADO Den Haag	Free transfer	
January 2006	DF	ENG	Mark McGregor	Blackpool	Free transfer	

=== Transfers out ===
Date from	Position	Nationality	Name	To	Fee	Ref.
January 2006	DF	ENG	Micky Bell	Cheltenham Town	Mutual agreement	
January 2006	DF	ENG	Sam Collins	Hull City	£65,000	
January 2006	FW	ENG	Billy Paynter	Hull City	£150,000	
May 2006	MF	IRL	Micky Cummins	Darlington	Free transfer	
May 2006	MF	ENG	Tony Dinning	Stockport County	Free transfer	
May 2006	MF	ENG	Sean Doherty	Accrington Stanley	Free transfer	
May 2006	DF	SCO	Mark Innes	Hyde United	Free transfer	
June 2006	GK	ENG	Jonny Brain	Macclesfield Town	Free transfer	
July 2006	FW	TRI	Hector Sam	Walsall	Free transfer	
August 2006	MF	TRI	Chris Birchall	Coventry City	£300,000	
August 2006	DF	ENG	Craig James	Darlington	Free transfer	
August 2006	FW	ENG	Lee Matthews	Crewe Alexandra	Free transfer	
August 2006	DF	WAL	Steve Rowland	Southport	Free transfer	
Summer 2006	MF	ENG	Andy Porter	Alsager Town	Retired	

=== Loans in ===
Date from	Position	Nationality	Name	From	Date to	Ref.
29 August 2005	FW	ENG	Chris Cornes	Wolverhampton Wanderers	1 December 2005	
28 September 2005	MF	ENG	Darrell Clarke	Hartlepool United	28 October 2005	
22 September 2005	FW	IRL	Gary Mulligan	Sheffield United	22 December 2005	
4 November 2005	FW	ENG	Leon Constantine	Torquay United	1 January 2006	
9 November 2005	DF	ENG	Clayton Fortune	Bristol City	End of season	
10 November 2005	MF	ENG	Sam Togwell	Crystal Palace	End of season	
31 January 2006	DF	ENG	Jason Talbot	Mansfield Town	End of season	

=== Loans out ===
Date from	Position	Nationality	Name	To	Date to	Ref.
17 November 2005	GK	ENG	Joe Anyon	Harrogate Town	?	
4 November 2005	DF	ENG	Sam Collins	Hull City	2 January 2006	
17 November 2005	FW	ENG	Billy Paynter	Hull City	1 January 2006	
24 February 2006	GK	ENG	Joe Anyon	Harrogate Town	12 April 2006	
