= 2006–07 Port Vale F.C. season =

Port Vale F.C.
2006–07 season
- Owner: Valiant 2001
- Chairman: Bill Bratt
- Manager: Martin Foyle
- Stadium: Vale Park
- Football League One: 12th (60 points)
- FA Cup: Second Round (eliminated by Hereford United)
- League Cup: Fourth Round (eliminated by Tottenham Hotspur)
- Football League Trophy: Second Round (eliminated by Crewe Alexandra)
- Player of the Year: Akpo Sodje
- Top goalscorer: League: Leon Constantine (22); All: Leon Constantine (26)
- Highest home attendance: 7,388 vs. Nottingham Forest, 26 September 2006
- Lowest home attendance: 3,077 vs. Gillingham, 5 December 2006
- Average home league attendance: 4,726
- Biggest win: 4–0 and 5–1
- Biggest defeat: 0–4 vs. Hereford United, 2 December 2006
Home colours	Away colours

The 2006–07 season was Port Vale's 95th season of football in the English Football League, and third-successive season in League One. Under manager Martin Foyle, the club finished 12th with 60 points, maintaining mid-table stability despite periods of inconsistency. The attacking partnership of Leon Constantine and Akpo Sodje proved prolific, contributing a combined total of 42 goals, with Constantine leading the team with 26 goals in all competitions and 22 in the league, earning him the club's top scorer accolade.

In cup competitions, Vale reached the Fourth Round of the League Cup, marking their deepest run in the competition in recent years, where they were eliminated by Premier League side Tottenham Hotspur. They exited the FA Cup and the Football League Trophy in the Second Round, defeated by Hereford United and Crewe Alexandra, respectively.

Off the pitch, the club's financial situation remained challenging, with average home league attendances around 4,726 and a lowest home attendance of 3,077 recorded against Gillingham in December. Despite these challenges, Akpo Sodje was named Player of the Year for his contributions on the field. At the season's conclusion, both Constantine and senior midfielder Danny Sonner departed the club, disrupting Foyle's plans for the following season.

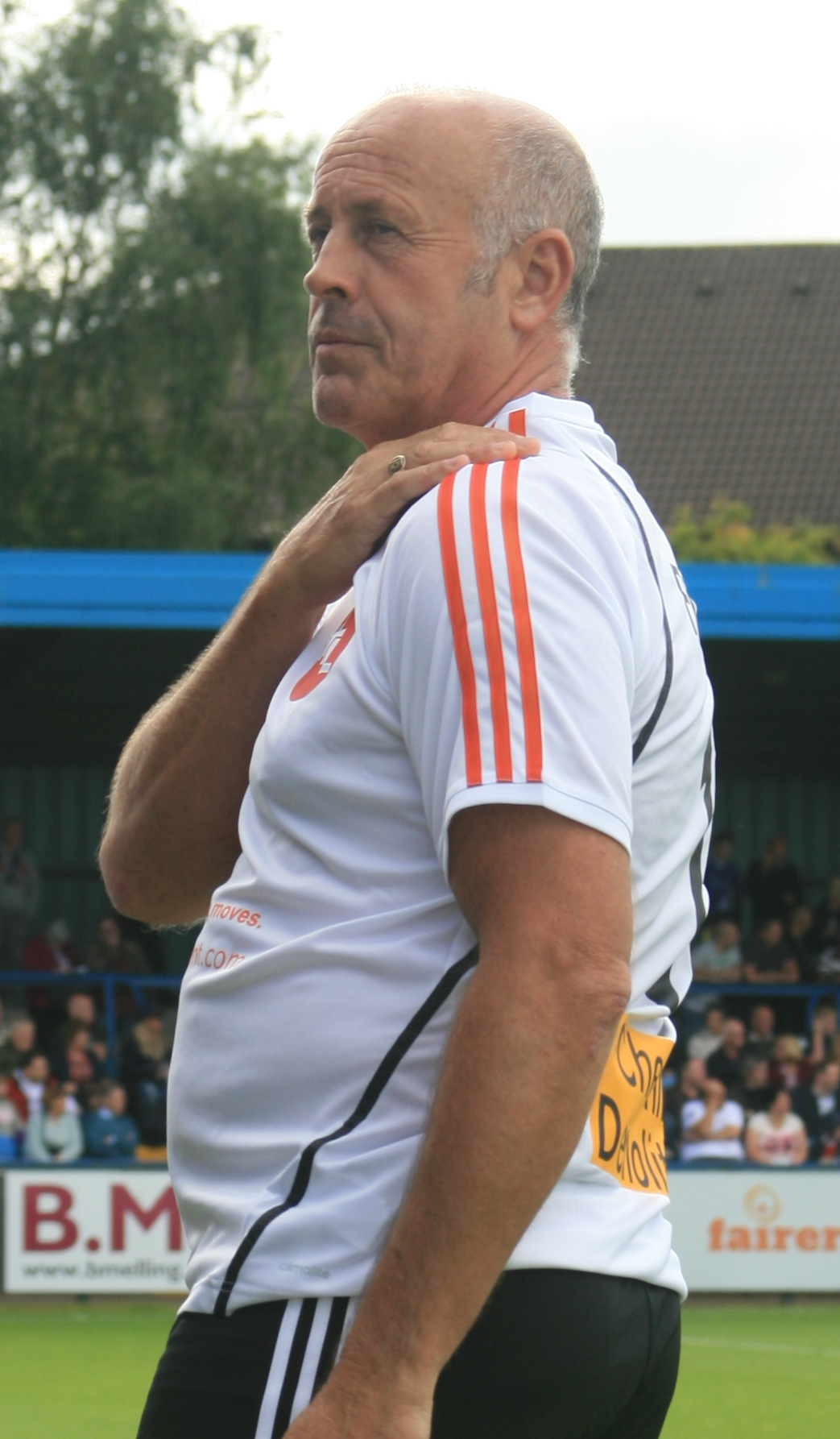
Manager Martin Foyle.

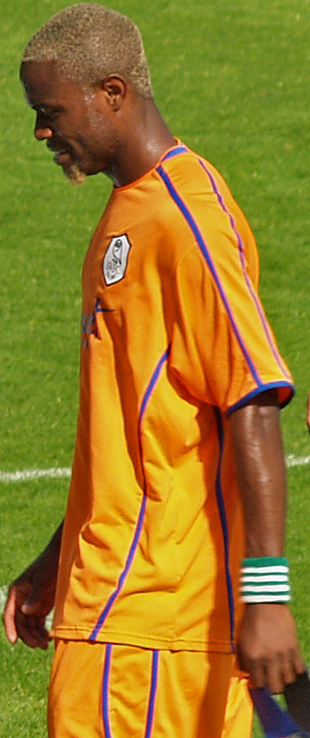
Player of the Year Akpo Sodje.

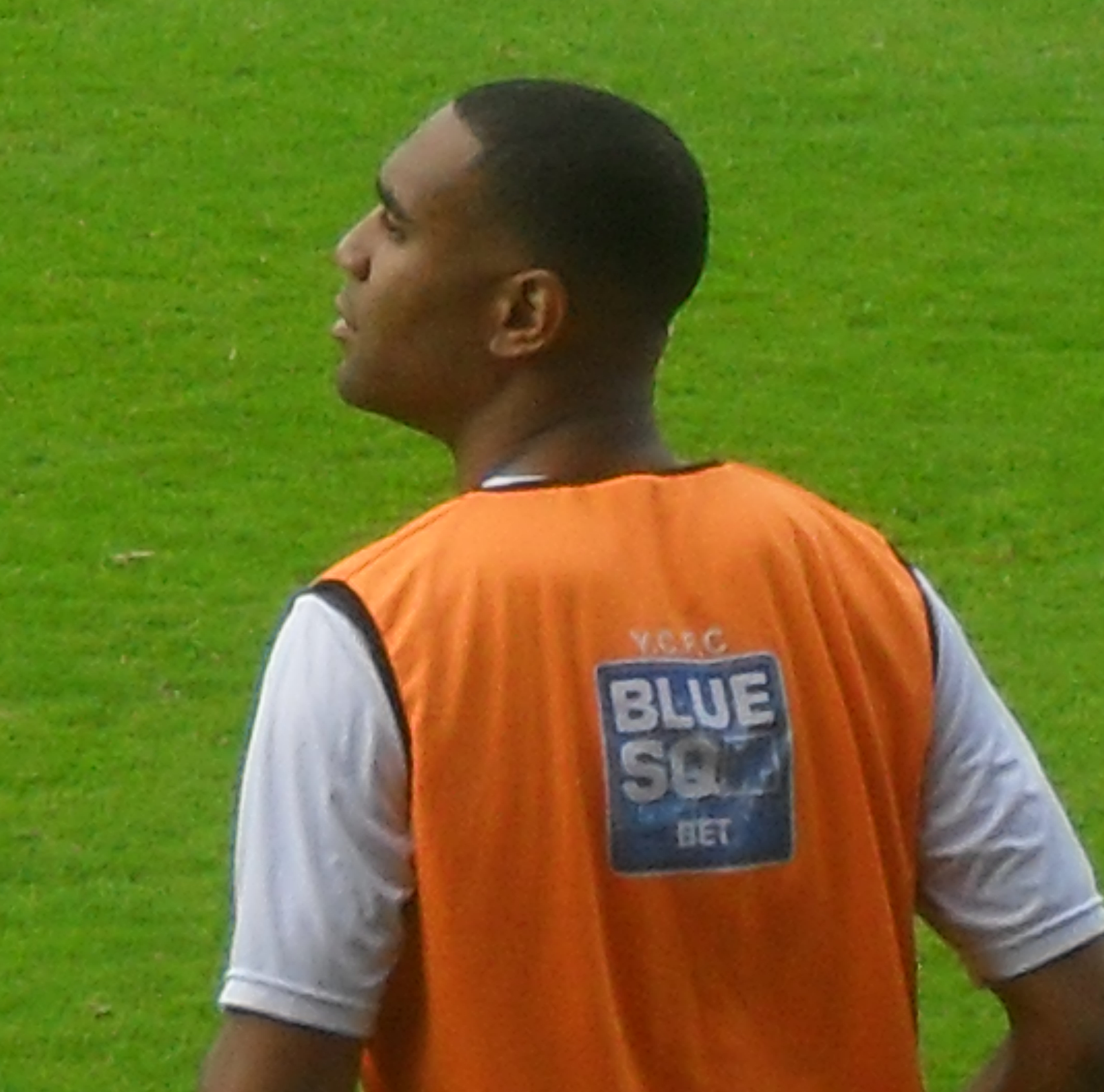
Top-scorer Leon Constantine.

== Overview ==
=== League One ===
The pre-season saw Martin Foyle make a number of signings, including: Danny Sonner (Peterborough United); Jason Talbot (Mansfield Town); Paul Harsley (Macclesfield Town); Richard Walker (Crewe Alexandra); Danny Whitaker (Macclesfield Town); Colin Miles (Yeovil Town); and Akpo Sodje (Darlington). He also took Stefan Moore on loan from Queens Park Rangers, and utility player Ritchie Humphreys from Hartlepool United. Youth team player Danny Glover, son of assistant manager Dean Glover, was also given a squad number.

The season started with Vale in fine form, winning their first four games for the first time in 77 years. His four goals meant Constantine was named the division's Player of the Month for August. This run stopped with four defeats in the next five games, with Vale scoring just three goals. Vale beat Blackpool by two goals to one, Keith Southern's last-minute goal halving Vale's lead established by Constantine and Sodje.

In November, Ross Gardner was signed on loan from Nottingham Forest and would join permanently in the January transfer window. Foyle also signed defender Clayton Fortune on a season-long loan for a second time, this time from Leyton Orient. Heading into December with just three wins in 15 league games, they won their first four games, with Constantine hitting five of Vale's nine goals. On 16 December, Vale won 1–0 at home to Brentford as Foyle recovered in hospital from an infected knee, with assistant Dean Glover taking charge in his absence.

In January, Foyle splashed out £30,000 on Crewe Alexandra striker Luke Rodgers. He also signed former teammate Paul Musselwhite as an emergency back-up goalkeeper following an injury to Mark Goodlad, as well as Cardiff City midfielder Malvin Kamara. He also turned down an offer from Barnsley of £200,000 (plus Marc Richards) for Constantine, who claimed to be happy at Vale Park. However, he did sell skilful winger Jeff Smith to Carlisle United for £60,000. Also leaving Burslem was Louis Briscoe, who was allowed to join Leek Town. On 13 January, they fell to a 2–1 defeat at Blackpool, with all three goals coming in the final 18 minutes: Andy Morrell put the Tangerines in front after 72 minutes, and David Fox followed his lead four minutes later, before Sodje halved Vale's deficit from the penalty spot in injury time. Vale's form had left them once again, as they failed to pick up a win in a sequence of seven games.

In February, defender Rhys Weston joined on a short-term contract, having left Norwegian club Viking FK. On 10 March, Vale travelled to the Don Valley Stadium, and Sodje managed to hit four goals past the Rotherham United defence to give Vale a 5–1 win. This gave Vale fans a sliver of hope of reaching the play-offs, but Vale failed to string two wins together in their final nine games, despite a 3–0 win over nearby Crewe Alexandra. They ended the season with a 2–1 home win over AFC Bournemouth as goals from Sodje and Rodgers were enough to defeat the visitors despite a late goal from Luke Summerfield.

They finished in twelfth place with sixty points, a clear distance from both the play-off and the relegation zones. They again had the lowest number of draws in the division, recording just six stalemates. Constantine was the second-highest scorer in the division after Billy Sharp of Scunthorpe United. Player of the Year, Sodje also hit 16 goals. Captain George Pilkington and midfielder Danny Whitaker missed just two games between them all season.

At the end of the season a number of players were released: Nathan Lowndes (Chester City); George Abbey (Crewe Alexandra); Rhys Weston (Walsall); Michael Husbands (Macclesfield Town); Christian Smith (Clyde); Ross Gardner (Ilkeston Town); Malvin Kamara (Huddersfield Town); Michael Walsh and Mark Soboljew. Leon Constantine also decided against signing a new contract at Vale. Instead, he joined Leeds United. Danny Sonner also rejected his contract offer, and moved on to Walsall, but not before making a parting shot at the club's leadership.

=== Finances ===
The club had to make monthly repayments of around £19,000 for a £2.25 million loan from the local council in 2005. The club's shirt sponsorship came from local company BGC Gas.

=== Cup competitions ===
In the FA Cup, Vale advanced past League Two side Lincoln City with a 2–1 victory at Sincil Bank. However, they then were on the end of a 4–0 hiding from Hereford United at Edgar Street in the second round.

In the League Cup, Vale faced Preston North End, who they defeated with goals from Sodje and Constantine. The "Valiants" then vanquished Queens Park Rangers 3–2 in the second round. This left them facing Norwich City, the third Championship club of the season to travel to Burslem in the League Cup. Vale again upset the odds by winning the penalty shoot-out 3–2 following a goalless draw against a strong "Canary" side. Premier League club Tottenham Hotspur awaited in the fourth round, who at White Hart Lane proved to be too much of a challenge for the Vale. Constantine put Vale into the lead, but a Tom Huddlestone goal took the game into extra time before both Huddlestone and Jermain Defoe scored to give Spurs a 3–1 win, thus saving Martin Jol's blushes. This represented the club's greatest achievement in the competition, as Vale had never reached the fourth round before, and would not do so again until 2023.

In the Football League Trophy, Vale advanced past Scunthorpe United after winning on penalties at Glanford Park. They then had a home tie with local rivals Crewe Alexandra. The "Railwaymen" won the game 3–2 despite a brace from Constantine.

== Results ==
=== Pre-season ===
29 July 1996 Friendly	Port Vale	5–0	Wrexham	Burslem
15:00 BST	Sodje 10'; Sonner 33'; Constantine 36'; Whitaker 78'; Husbands 89'	Report		Stadium: Vale Park; Attendance: 1,165; Referee: Tony Bates; Assistant referees: Paul Graham, Rob Merchan; Fourth official: Danny Meeson

=== Football League One ===
==== League table ====
Pos	Team	Pld	W	D	L	GF	GA	GD	Pts
10	Millwall	46	19	9	18	59	62	−3	66
11	Doncaster Rovers	46	16	15	15	52	47	+5	63
12	Port Vale	46	18	6	22	64	65	−1	60
13	Crewe Alexandra	46	17	9	20	66	72	−6	60
14	Northampton Town	46	15	14	17	48	51	−3	59

Rules for classification: In the Football League goals scored (GF) takes precedence over goal difference (GD).

==== Results by matchday ====
Round	1	2	3	4	5	6	7	8	9	10	11	12	13	14	15	16	17	18	19	20	21	22	23	24	25	26	27	28	29	30	31	32	33	34	35	36	37	38	39	40	41	42	43	44	45	46
Ground	H	A	A	H	A	H	H	A	A	H	H	A	H	A	H	A	A	H	A	H	A	H	H	A	A	H	H	A	A	A	H	A	H	A	H	H	A	H	H	A	H	A	H	A	A	H
Result	W	W	W	W	L	L	W	L	L	L	D	W	L	W	L	D	L	L	L	W	W	W	W	L	L	D	L	L	D	L	W	L	W	L	W	D	W	L	W	D	L	L	W	L	L	W
Position	1	1	1	1	2	3	3	3	4	7	9	8	10	7	9	10	13	14	17	15	12	9	9	10	11	11	11	11	13	15	12	16	14	15	13	13	12	12	11	12	12	14	12	14	15	12
Points	3	6	9	12	12	12	15	15	15	15	16	19	19	22	22	23	23	23	23	26	29	32	35	35	35	36	36	36	37	37	40	40	43	43	46	47	50	50	53	54	54	54	57	57	57	60

Source: Statto
A = Away; H = Home; W = Win; D = Draw; L = Loss

==== Matches ====
5 August 2006 1	Port Vale	3–0	Leyton Orient	Burslem
	Constantine 43', 72'; Sodje 78'	Report		Stadium: Vale Park; Attendance: 5,631; Referee: Andy Woolmer

8 August 2006 2	Oldham Athletic	0–1	Port Vale	Oldham
		Report	Sodje 66'	Stadium: Boundary Park; Attendance: 4,975; Referee: Neil Swarbrick

12 August 2006 3	Cheltenham Town	0–1	Port Vale	Cheltenham
		Report	Constantine 55'	Stadium: Whaddon Road; Attendance: 4,309; Referee: Dean Whitestone

19 August 2006 4	Port Vale	3–2	Chesterfield	Burslem
	Constantine 44', 87'; Pilkington 77'	Report	Downes 23'; Folan 85'	Stadium: Vale Park; Attendance: 5,622; Referee: Darren Deadman

26 August 2006 5	Yeovil Town	1–0	Port Vale	Yeovil
	Terry 5'	Report		Stadium: Huish Park; Attendance: 4,827; Referee: Clive Penton

3 September 2006 6	Port Vale	1–2	Doncaster Rovers	Burslem
14:00 BST	Whitaker 43'	Report	Heffernan 88' (pen.), 90'	Stadium: Vale Park; Attendance: 4,862; Referee: Paul Taylor

9 September 2006 7	Port Vale	2–1	Blackpool	Burslem
	Constantine 45'; Sodje 68'	Report	Southern 90'	Stadium: Vale Park; Attendance: 5,171; Referee: Phil Joslin

12 September 2006 8	Scunthorpe United	3–0	Port Vale	Scunthorpe
	Sharp 10', 45'; Morris 65'	Report		Stadium: Glanford Park; Attendance: 3,473; Referee: Andy D'Urso

16 September 2006 9	Bradford City	2–0	Port Vale	Bradford
19:30 BST	Bridge-Wilkinson 60'; Graham 64'	Report		Stadium: Valley Parade; Attendance: 7,829; Referee: Scott Mathieson

23 September 2006 10	Port Vale	0–2	Bristol City	Burslem
		Report	Brown 45'; Jevons 76'	Stadium: Vale Park; Attendance: 5,295; Referee: Eddie Ilderton

26 September 2006 11	Port Vale	1–1	Nottingham Forest	Burslem
	Husbands 1'	Report	Breckin 33'	Stadium: Vale Park; Attendance: 7,388; Referee: Rob Lewis

30 September 2006 12	Northampton Town	0–2	Port Vale	Northampton
		Report	Pilkington 12'; Moore 32'	Stadium: Sixfields Stadium; Attendance: 5,316; Referee: Ray Olivier

8 October 2006 13	Port Vale	1–3	Rotherham United	Burslem
14:00 BST	Constantine 74' (pen.)	Report	Cochrane 47'; Hibbert 53'; Hoskins 85'	Stadium: Vale Park; Attendance: 4,810; Referee: Darren Drysdale

13 October 2006 14	Tranmere Rovers	1–2	Port Vale	Prenton
	Greenacre 57'	Report	Smith 31'; Constantine 45'	Stadium: Prenton Park; Attendance: 7,866; Referee: Mick Russell

21 October 2006 15	Port Vale	1–2	Huddersfield Town	Burslem
	Constantine 33'	Report	Booth 77'; Collins 79'	Stadium: Vale Park; Attendance: 5,225; Referee: Nigel Miller

28 October 2006 16	Millwall	1–1	Port Vale	Bermondsey, Southwark
	Zebroski 20'	Report	Sodje 72'	Stadium: The Den; Attendance: 10,189; Referee: Keith Hill

4 November 2006 17	Crewe Alexandra	2–1	Port Vale	Crewe
	Maynard 32'; Rodgers 90' (pen.)	Report	Abbey 36'	Stadium: Gresty Road; Attendance: 7,632; Referee: Andy Woolmer

18 November 2006 18	Port Vale	0–2	Swansea City	Burslem
		Report	Trundle 89'; Butler 90'	Stadium: Vale Park; Attendance: 4,615; Referee: Fred Graham

25 November 2006 19	Carlisle United	3–2	Port Vale	Carlisle
	Holmes 66'; Hawley 77'; Murphy 81'	Report	Harsley 26'; Smith 40'	Stadium: Brunton Park; Attendance: 7,543; Referee: Jon Moss

5 December 2006 20	Port Vale	2–0	Gillingham	Burslem
	Gardner 8'; Constantine 75'	Report		Stadium: Vale Park; Attendance: 3,077; Referee: Rob Lewis

9 December 2006 21	AFC Bournemouth	0–4	Port Vale	Bournemouth
		Report	Constantine 3', 68'; Pilkington 13'; Sodje 80'	Stadium: Dean Court; Attendance: 4,538; Referee: Andy D'Urso

16 December 2006 22	Port Vale	1–0	Brentford	Burslem
	Pilkington 87'	Report		Stadium: Vale Park; Attendance: 4,166; Referee: Graham Salisbury

23 December 2006 23	Port Vale	2–1	Brighton & Hove Albion	Burslem
	Constantine 13', 23' (pen.)	Report	Fraser 84'	Stadium: Vale Park; Attendance: 4,349; Referee: Phil Crossley

26 December 2006 24	Nottingham Forest	3–0	Port Vale	Nottingham
	Tyson 13'; Holt 65', 90'	Report		Stadium: City Ground; Attendance: 22,999; Referee: Carl Boyeson

30 December 2006 25	Bristol City	2–1	Port Vale	Ashton Gate, Bristol
	Brooker 69'; Murray 76'	Report	Smith 68'	Stadium: Ashton Gate; Attendance: 12,776; Referee: Ray Lee

1 January 2007 26	Port Vale	0–0	Scunthorpe United	Burslem
		Report		Stadium: Vale Park; Attendance: 4,869; Referee: Clive Oliver

6 January 2007 27	Port Vale	0–1	Bradford City	Burslem
		Report	Schumacher 54'	Stadium: Vale Park; Attendance: 4,146; Referee: Grant Hegley

13 January 2007 28	Blackpool	2–1	Port Vale	Blackpool
	Morrell 72'; Fox 76'	Report	Sodje 90' (pen.)	Stadium: Bloomfield Road; Attendance: 6,661; Referee: Mark Haywood

27 January 2007 29	Brighton & Hove Albion	0–0	Port Vale	Brighton
		Report		Stadium: Withdean Stadium; Attendance: 5,177; Referee: Mike Thorpe

3 February 2007 30	Leyton Orient	2–1	Port Vale	Leyton, East London
	Lockwood 68'; Ibehre 86'	Report	Gardner 12'	Stadium: Brisbane Road; Attendance: 4,295; Referee: Jarnail Singh

6 February 2007 31	Port Vale	1–0	Northampton Town	Burslem
	Whitaker 47'	Report		Stadium: Vale Park; Attendance: 3,353; Referee: Anthony Taylor

17 February 2007 32	Chesterfield	3–0	Port Vale	Chesterfield, Derbyshire
	Picken 38'; Ward 79'; Allison 90'	Report		Stadium: Saltergate; Attendance: 3,752; Referee: Mike Pike

20 February 2007 33	Port Vale	3–0	Oldham Athletic	Burslem
	Whitaker 18'; Pilkington 49'; Constantine 79' (pen.)	Report		Stadium: Vale Park; Attendance: 4,061; Referee: Richard Beeby

24 February 2007 34	Doncaster Rovers	1–0	Port Vale	Doncaster
	Price 49'	Report		Stadium: Belle Vue; Attendance: 7,848; Referee: Andy Hall

3 March 2007 35	Port Vale	4–2	Yeovil Town	Burslem
	Constantine 15', 80'; Whitaker 17'; Rose 49' (og.)	Report	Gray 37'; Stewart 38'	Stadium: Vale Park; Attendance: 4,202; Referee: Steve Bratt

6 March 2007 36	Port Vale	1–1	Cheltenham Town	Burslem
	Kamara 41'	Report	Townsend 70'	Stadium: Vale Park; Attendance: 3,340; Referee: Neil Swarbrick

10 March 2007 37	Rotherham United	1–5	Port Vale	Rotherham
	Facey 67'	Report	Sodje 11', 25', 29', 78'; Pilkington 44'	Stadium: Millmoor; Attendance: 3,854; Referee: Russell Booth

17 March 2007 38	Port Vale	2–3	Tranmere Rovers	Burslem
	Sonner 36'; Constantine 73'	Report	Greenacre 3', 35' (pen.); Ellison 83'	Stadium: Vale Park; Attendance: 4,809; Referee: Danny McDermid

24 March 2007 39	Port Vale	2–0	Millwall	Burslem
	Whitaker 11'; Sodje 53'	Report		Stadium: Vale Park; Attendance: 3,973; Referee: Mark Haywood

31 March 2007 40	Huddersfield Town	2–2	Port Vale	Huddersfield
	Beckett 4'; McAliskey 46'	Report	Sodje 35', 68'	Stadium: Kirklees Stadium; Attendance: 10,313; Referee: Gary Sutton

7 April 2007 41	Port Vale	0–2	Carlisle United	Burslem
		Report	Graham 27'; Garner 90'	Stadium: Vale Park; Attendance: 4,882; Referee: Eddie Ilderton

9 April 2007 42	Swansea City	3–0	Port Vale	Swansea
	Trundle 19'; Duffy 26', 59'	Report		Stadium: Liberty Stadium; Attendance: 12,465; Referee: Lee Probert

14 April 2007 43	Port Vale	3–0	Crewe Alexandra	Burslem
	Hulbert 36'; Constantine 59'; Rodgers 63'	Report		Stadium: Vale Park; Attendance: 5,740; Referee: Andy Woolmer

21 April 2007 44	Gillingham	3–2	Port Vale	Gillingham, Kent
	Cox 37'; Flynn 49', 53'	Report	Whitaker 78'; Constantine 90' (pen.)	Stadium: Priestfield Stadium; Attendance: 5,928; Referee: Dean Whitestone

28 April 2007 45	Brentford	4–3	Port Vale	Brentford, West London
	Ide 2', 39'; Keith 68' (pen.); Charles 89'	Report	Rodgers 55'; Constantine 59', 83'	Stadium: Griffin Park; Attendance: 5,125; Referee: Gary Sutton

5 May 2007 46	Port Vale	2–1	AFC Bournemouth	Burslem
	Sodje 51'; Rodgers 57'	Report	Summerfield 80'	Stadium: Vale Park; Attendance: 5,080; Referee: Darren Deadman

=== FA Cup ===
11 November 2006 R1	Port Vale	1–2	Lincoln City	Burslem
	Whitaker 29'; Sodje 38'	Report	Frecklington 84'	Stadium: Vale Park; Attendance: 3,884; Referee: Graham Salisbury

2 December 2006 R2	Hereford United	4–0	Port Vale	Hereford
13:00 GMT	Webb 41'; Purdie 49' (pen.), 51'; Ferrell 83'	Report		Stadium: Edgar Street; Attendance: 4,076; Referee: Lee Probert

=== League Cup ===
23 August 2006 R1	Port Vale	2–1	Preston North End	Burslem
	Sodje 52'; Constantine 82'	Report	Whaley 72'	Stadium: Vale Park; Attendance: 3,522; Referee: Andy Hall

19 September 2006 R2	Port Vale	3–2	Queens Park Rangers	Burslem
	Smith 19'; Whitaker 28'; Walker 61'	Report	Nygaard 9'; Stewart 78'	Stadium: Vale Park; Attendance: 3,550; Referee: Graham Salisbury

24 October 2006 R3	Port Vale	0–0 (a.e.t.) (3–2 p)	Norwich City	Burslem
		Report		Stadium: Vale Park; Attendance: 4,518; Referee: Mark Halsey
	Penalties
	Walker (penalty missed); Constantine (penalty missed); Harsley (penalty scored); Whitaker (penalty scored); Smith (penalty scored)		Robinson (penalty missed); Thorne (penalty scored); Shackell (penalty missed); Eagle (penalty missed); Dublin (penalty scored)

8 November 2006 R4	Tottenham Hotspur	3–1 (a.e.t.)	Port Vale	Tottenham, North London
20:00 GMT	Huddlestone 80', 99'; Defoe 107'	Report	Constantine 64'	Stadium: White Hart Lane; Attendance: 34,560; Referee: Steve Bennett

=== Football League Trophy ===
30 October 2006 R1	Scunthorpe United	0–0 (3–5 p)	Port Vale	Scunthorpe
19:15 GMT		Report		Stadium: Glanford Park; Attendance: 3,421; Referee: Mark Haywood
	Penalties
	Crosby (penalty scored); Goodwin (penalty scored); Byrne (penalty missed); Ridley (penalty scored)		Harsley (penalty scored); Sodje (penalty scored); Constantine (penalty scored); Sonner (penalty scored); Smith (penalty scored)

29 November 2006 R2	Port Vale	2–3	Crewe Alexandra	Burslem
19:15 GMT	Constantine 78', 88'	Report	Lowe 38' (pen.); Jack 48'; Varney 57'	Stadium: Vale Park; Attendance: 4,694; Referee: Jarnail Singh

== Squad statistics ==
=== Appearances and goals ===
Key to positions: GK – Goalkeeper; DF – Defender; MF – Midfielder; FW – Forward

No.	Pos	Nat	Player	Total		League One		FA Cup		League Cup		Football League Trophy	
No.	Pos	Nat	Player	Apps	Goals	Apps	Goals	Apps	Goals	Apps	Goals	Apps	Goals
1	GK	(England) ENG	Mark Goodlad	32	0	25	0	2	0	4	0	1	0
2	DF	(England) ENG	George Pilkington	53	6	46	6	1	0	4	0	2	0
3	DF	(England) ENG	Jason Talbot	26	0	22	0	0	0	3	0	1	0
4	MF	(Northern Ireland) NIR	Danny Sonner	40	1	33	1	2	0	4	0	1	0
5	DF	(England) ENG	Michael Walsh	20	0	18	0	0	0	1	0	1	0
6	DF	(England) ENG	Richard Walker	22	1	16	0	1	0	4	1	1	0
7	FW	(England) ENG	Luke Rodgers	8	3	8	3	0	0	0	0	0	0
8	MF	(England) ENG	Paul Harsley	40	1	32	1	2	0	4	0	2	0
9	FW	(England) ENG	Nathan Lowndes	12	0	12	0	0	0	0	0	0	0
10	FW	(England) ENG	Leon Constantine	50	26	42	22	2	0	4	2	2	2
12	GK	(England) ENG	Joe Anyon	23	0	22	0	0	0	0	0	1	0
14	MF	(England) ENG	Danny Whitaker	53	8	45	6	2	1	4	1	2	0
15	DF	(Nigeria) NGR	George Abbey	31	1	24	1	2	0	3	0	2	0
16	DF	(England) ENG	Mark McGregor	35	0	32	0	1	0	2	0	0	0
17	FW	(Saint Lucia) LCA	Michael Husbands	27	1	23	1	0	0	3	0	1	0
18	DF	(England) ENG	Colin Miles	33	0	29	0	2	0	1	0	1	0
19	MF	(England) ENG	Joe Cardle	10	0	7	0	1	0	1	0	1	0
20	FW	(England) ENG	Akpo Sodje	50	16	43	14	1	1	4	1	2	0
21	MF	(England) ENG	Robin Hulbert	20	1	20	1	0	0	0	0	0	0
22	MF	(England) ENG	Mark Soboljew	0	0	0	0	0	0	0	0	0	0
23	DF	(England) ENG	Luke Prosser	0	0	0	0	0	0	0	0	0	0
24	DF	(Wales) WAL	Rhys Weston	15	0	15	0	0	0	0	0	0	0
25	MF	(England) ENG	Christian Smith	1	0	1	0	0	0	0	0	0	0
26	GK	(England) ENG	Chris Martin	0	0	0	0	0	0	0	0	0	0
27	MF	(England) ENG	Ross Gardner	20	2	16	2	2	0	1	0	1	0
28	FW	(England) ENG	Danny Glover	0	0	0	0	0	0	0	0	0	0
29	DF	(England) ENG	Clayton Fortune	15	0	13	0	1	0	0	0	1	0
32	MF	(Sierra Leone) SLE	Malvin Kamara	18	1	18	1	0	0	0	0	0	0
40	GK	(England) ENG	Paul Musselwhite	0	0	0	0	0	0	0	0	0	0
Players who featured but departed the club during the season:
7	FW	(England) ENG	Stefan Moore	15	1	12	1	1	0	1	0	1	0
11	MF	(England) ENG	Jeff Smith	34	4	27	3	2	0	4	1	1	0
24	MF	(England) ENG	Louis Briscoe	1	0	0	0	1	0	0	0	0	0
27	DF	(England) ENG	Ritchie Humphreys	7	0	7	0	0	0	0	0	0	0

=== Top scorers ===
Place	Position	Nation	Number	Name	EFL League One	FA Cup	EFL Cup	EFL Trophy	Total
1	FW	England	10	Leon Constantine	22	0	2	2	26
2	FW	England	20	Akpo Sodje	14	1	1	0	16
3	MF	England	14	Danny Whitaker	6	1	1	0	8
4	DF	England	2	George Pilkington	6	0	0	0	6
5	MF	England	11	Jeff Smith	3	0	1	0	4
6	FW	England	7	Luke Rodgers	3	0	0	0	3
7	MF	England	27	Ross Gardner	2	0	0	0	2
8	MF	Northern Ireland	4	Danny Sonner	1	0	0	0	1
–	FW	England	7	Stefan Moore	1	0	0	0	1
–	FW	Saint Lucia	17	Michael Husbands	1	0	0	0	1
–	DF	England	6	Richard Walker	0	0	1	0	1
–	DF	Nigeria	15	George Abbey	1	0	0	0	1
–	MF	England	8	Paul Harsley	1	0	0	0	1
–	MF	Sierra Leone	32	Malvin Kamara	1	0	0	0	1
–	MF	England	21	Robin Hulbert	1	0	0	0	1
–	–	–	–	Own goals	1	0	0	0	1
				TOTALS	64	2	6	2	74

== Transfers ==
=== Transfers in ===
Date from	Position	Nationality	Name	From	Fee	Ref.
May 2006	MF	ENG	Paul Harsley	Macclesfield Town	Free transfer	
May 2006	DF	ENG	Jason Talbot	Mansfield Town	Free transfer	
June 2006	DF	ENG	Colin Miles	Yeovil Town	Free transfer	
June 2006	DF	ENG	Richard Walker	Crewe Alexandra	Free transfer	
June 2006	MF	ENG	Danny Whitaker	Macclesfield Town	Free transfer	
August 2006	FW	ENG	Akpo Sodje	Darlington	Free transfer	
January 2007	MF	ENG	Ross Gardner	Nottingham Forest	Free transfer	
January 2007	FW	SLE	Malvin Kamara	Cardiff City	'nominal'	
January 2007	GK	ENG	Paul Musselwhite	Kettering Town	Free transfer	
January 2007	FW	ENG	Luke Rodgers	Crewe Alexandra	£30,000	
February 2007	DF	WAL	Rhys Weston	(Norway) Viking	Free transfer	

=== Transfers out ===
Date from	Position	Nationality	Name	To	Fee	Ref.
January 2007	FW	ENG	Louis Briscoe	Leek Town	Released	
January 2007	MF	ENG	Jeff Smith	Carlisle United	£60,000	
May 2007	DF	NGR	George Abbey	Crewe Alexandra	Released	
May 2007	MF	ENG	Ross Gardner	Ilkeston Town	Released	
May 2007	MF	NIR	Danny Sonner	Walsall	Rejected contract	
May 2007	DF	ENG	Michael Walsh	Retired		
June 2007	FW	SLE	Malvin Kamara	Huddersfield Town	Free transfer	
June 2007	FW	ENG	Nathan Lowndes	Chester City	Released	
June 2007	GK	ENG	Paul Musselwhite	Harrogate Town	Free transfer	
June 2007	MF	ENG	Christian Smith	(Scotland) Clyde	Free transfer	
July 2007	FW	Saint Lucia	Michael Husbands	Macclesfield Town	Released	
July 2007	DF	WAL	Rhys Weston	Walsall	Released	
August 2007	FW	ENG	Leon Constantine	Leeds United	Bosman transfer	

=== Loans in ===
Date from	Position	Nationality	Name	From	Date to	Ref.
29 August 2006	FW	ENG	Stefan Moore	Queens Park Rangers	29 December 2006	
8 September 2006	MF	ENG	Ritchie Humphreys	Hartlepool United	9 October 2006	
7 November 2006	MF	ENG	Ross Gardner	Nottingham Forest	8 January 2007	
22 November 2006	DF	ENG	Clayton Fortune	Leyton Orient	End of season	

=== Loans out ===
Date from	Position	Nationality	Name	To	Date to	Ref.
25 January 2007	MF	ENG	Christian Smith	Cambridge United	20 March 2007	
22 March 2007	MF	ENG	Christian Smith	Northwich Victoria	End of season	
22 March 2007	DF	ENG	Richard Walker	Wrexham	8 April 2007	
March 2007	GK	ENG	Chris Martin	Kidsgrove Athletic	End of season	
