= Sean Doherty (footballer) =

English footballer (born 1985)

Personal information
- Full name: Sean Anthony Doherty
- Date of birth: 10 February 1985 (age 41)
- Place of birth: Basingstoke, England
- Height: 5 ft 9 in (1.75 m)
- Position: Midfielder

Youth career
- Everton

Senior career*
Years	Team	Apps	(Gls)
2001–2005	Fulham	0	(0)
2003	→ Blackpool (loan)	1	(0)
2005–2006	ADO Den Haag	0	(0)
2006	Port Vale	6	(0)
2006–2007	Accrington Stanley	20	(1)
2006–2007	→ Southport (loan)	6	(1)
2007–2008	Royal Antwerp	7	(1)
2008–2009	Sligo Rovers	36	(4)
2009–2010	Witton Albion		
2010–2011	Marine		
2011	Colwyn Bay	4	(1)
2012	AFC Liverpool	4	(0)
2012–2013	Droyslden	5	(0)
2013–2014	Marine		

International career
- England U17
	England U21		(7)
- * Club domestic league appearances and goals

Sean Anthony Doherty (born 10 February 1985) is an English former footballer who played as a left-sided midfielder.

Spending his youth at the Everton academy, when he was signed by Fulham in 2001 (aged 16), he was considered one of the best young players in England. After a loan spell with Blackpool in 2003, he moved to the Netherlands to play for ADO Den Haag in 2005 – having never made a first-team appearance for Fulham. In 2006, he ended up at Accrington Stanley via Port Vale. He spent some time on loan at Southport before he left for the Belgian club Royal Antwerp in 2007. The next year, he signed with Irish side Sligo Rovers. In 2010, he joined Marine via Witton Albion before signing with Colwyn Bay the following year. In 2012, he played for AFC Liverpool and Droyslden, before returning to Marine in February 2013.

== Club career ==
Doherty started his career at Everton's youth academy before moving to Fulham in July 2001 for an undisclosed fee. After a loan spell with Blackpool, he signed a one-year contract with the club, which was extended until 2005. However, he failed to make the breakthrough to the Fulham first-team squad, having failed to play a single game he was released in May 2005. He went on to join Dutch Eredivisie club ADO Den Haag.

In January 2006, Doherty returned to England with Martin Foyle's Port Vale on a short-term contract, but failed to gain a first-team spot and was allowed to leave at the end of the 2005–06 season. Doherty signed for Accrington Stanley shortly thereafter, but only played twenty league games and scored once (against Grimsby Town), before he was released a year later. Although he had played for Southport on a three-month loan deal from November 2006 to January 2007, he failed to impress, only making seven appearances in three months.

In 2007, Doherty left England to sign a one-year deal at Belgian club Royal Antwerp. In January 2008, Doherty signed for Irish club Sligo Rovers. Nevertheless, after finding regular football, Doherty left Rovers on mutual agreement in July 2009. He quickly moved to Witton Albion and made one start and one substitute appearance during the 2009–10 season.

In February 2010, he signed for Marine of the Northern Premier League Premier Division. His club finished ninth in 2009–10 and eighth in 2010–11. In July 2011, he joined Conference North newcomers Colwyn Bay. He left the club three months later to work as a scout at Chelsea.

In September 2012, Doherty signed for Old Holts of the Liverpool County Premier League Division One. He later had spells with AFC Liverpool (North West Counties League) and Droyslden (Conference North) before rejoining former club Marine in February 2013. The "Mariners" finished 11th in 2012–13 and 20th in 2013–14.

== International career ==
Doherty was capped seven times by England at youth level. He represented the under 17s and under-21s. He managed to score for the under-17s in a 2002 UEFA European Under-17 Championship game against Finland.

== Career statistics ==
Appearances and goals by club, season and competition
Club	Season	League			FA Cup		Other		Total	
Club	Season	Division	Apps	Goals	Apps	Goals	Apps	Goals	Apps	Goals
Fulham	2001–02	Premier League	0	0	0	0	0	0	0	0
Blackpool (loan)	2003–04	Second Division	1	0	0	0	0	0	1	0
Port Vale	2005–06	League One	6	0	1	0	0	0	7	0
Accrington Stanley	2006–07	League Two	20	1	1	0	3	0	24	1
Southport (loan)	2006–07	Conference	6	1	0	0	2 (Note: 1 appearance in the FA Trophy and 1 appearance in the Lancashire Junior Cup.)	0	8	1
Witton Albion	2009–10	Northern Premier League; Division One South							2	0
Colwyn Bay	2011–12	Conference North	4	1	0	0	0	0	4	1
AFC Liverpool	2012–13	North West Counties; Premier Division	4	0	0	0	0	0	4	0
Droylsden	2012–13	Conference North	5	0	0	0	0	0	5	0
