= Leon Constantine =

English footballer (born 1978)

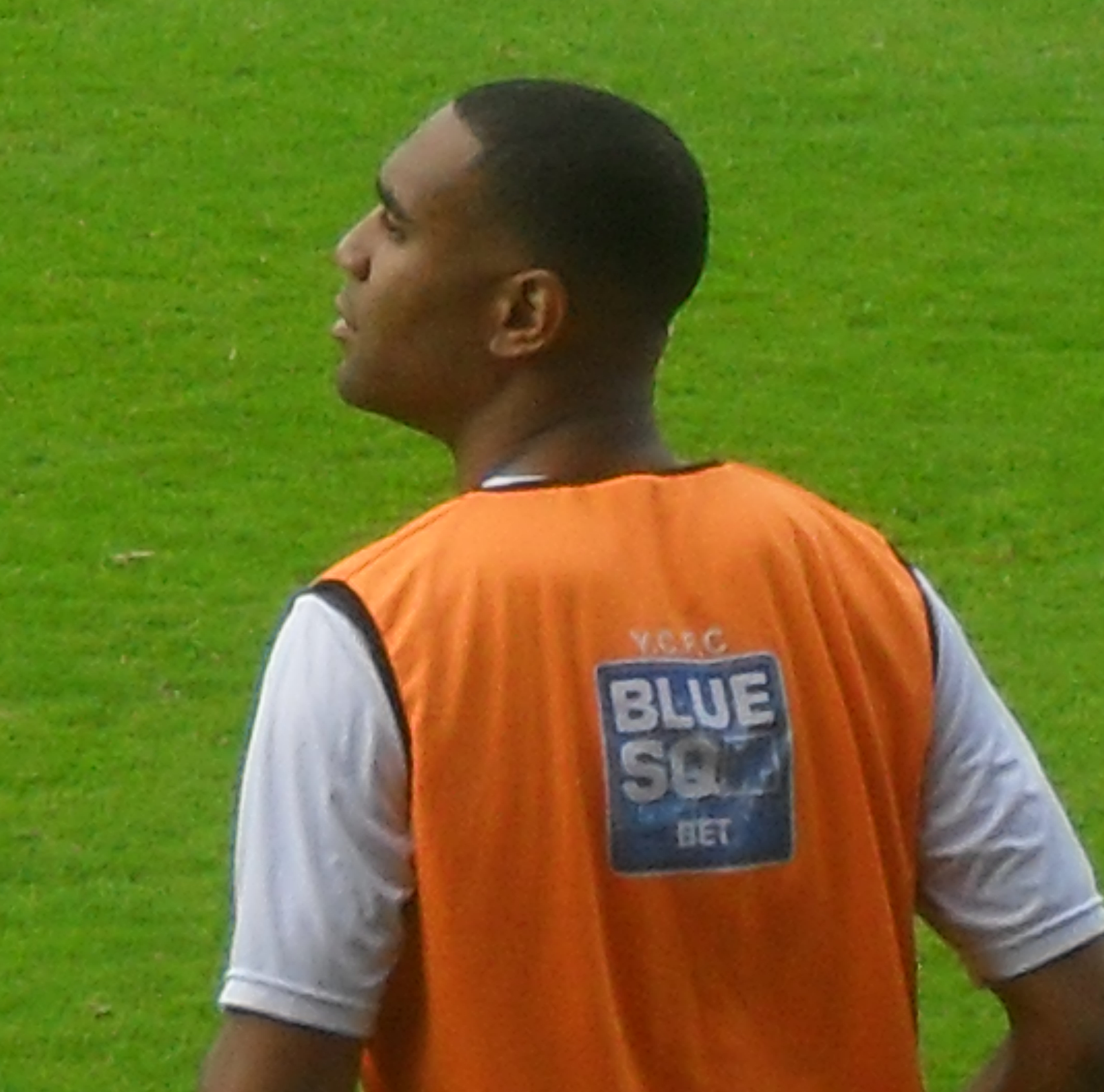
- Constantine in 2010

Personal information
- Full name: Leon Charles Constantine
- Date of birth: 24 February 1978 (age 48)
- Place of birth: Hackney, England
- Height: 6 ft 2 in (1.88 m)
- Position: Striker

Senior career*
Years	Team	Apps	(Gls)
–2000	Edgware Town	?	(?)
2000–2002	Millwall	1	(0)
2001	→ Leyton Orient (loan)	10	(3)
2002	→ Partick Thistle (loan)	2	(0)
2002–2003	Brentford	17	(0)
2003–2004	Southend United	43	(21)
2004	Peterborough United	11	(1)
2004	→ Torquay United (loan)	4	(3)
2004–2006	Torquay United	38	(7)
2005–2006	→ Port Vale (loan)	9	(3)
2006–2007	Port Vale	63	(29)
2007–2008	Leeds United	4	(1)
2008	→ Oldham Athletic (loan)	8	(2)
2008–2009	Northampton Town	32	(2)
2009	→ Cheltenham Town (loan)	6	(1)
2009–2010	Hereford United	35	(6)
2010–2011	York City	26	(8)
2011	Braintree Town	1	(0)
2011	Lewes	1	(0)
2011	Tooting & Mitcham United	1	(0)
2011–2012	Boston United	9	(0)
2012	Arlesey Town	5	(0)
2014–2016	Brimsdown	26	(4)
2016–2017	Enfield Borough	4	(0)
Total		356	(91)
- * Club domestic league appearances and goals

Leon Charles Constantine (born 24 February 1978) is an English former footballer who played as a striker. A journeyman of lower league English football, he had 21 separate spells at 19 different clubs within the space of just 12 years. A latecomer to the professional game, he found a Football League club at age 22 and was a regular first-team player for the first time at age 23.

Beginning his career as a Millwall reserve following an impressive spell at non-League Edgware Town, in 2002 he joined Brentford. He was unimpressive, however, and moved on to Southend United the following year, where he proved to be a goal-ever-other-game revelation. In 2004, he enjoyed a short spell with Peterborough United before Torquay United broke their club record in signing him. Again he disappointed, and in 2005, he moved on to Port Vale. With Vale, he was once more prolific, scoring 32 goals in 72 league games. In 2007, Leeds United were persuaded to sign him, though he fared poorly before transferring to Northampton Town the following year. He spent the 2009–10 season at Hereford United, followed by a spell with York City. He left York in 2011 for brief spells at Braintree Town, Lewes, Tooting & Mitcham United, Boston United, Arlesey Town, Brimsdown and then Enfield Borough. In addition to all of these clubs he has also had loan spells with Leyton Orient, Partick Thistle, Torquay United, Oldham Athletic, and Cheltenham Town over the years.

== Career ==
=== Early career ===
Born in Hackney, London, Constantine played for Edgware Town before joining Millwall on 31 August 2000 for a £6,000 fee. He made his debut for Millwall on 30 September, coming on as a late substitute for Paul Ifill in a 4–1 win away to Peterborough United.

He had loan spells with Leyton Orient and Partick Thistle before moving to Wally Downes's Brentford on a free transfer in August 2002. He struggled to establish himself at Griffin Park and in August 2003 joined Southend United, initially on non-contract terms, signing a permanent deal the following month. He finished as the club's top-scorer in the 2003–04 season with 25 goals in 53 appearances.

He helped Southend to reach the 2004 Football League Trophy final at the Millennium Stadium, where they were beaten 2–0 by Blackpool. He turned down the offer of a new two-year contract from Southend and joined Peterborough United on a two-year contract in May 2004, scoring his first and what turned out to be the only goal for the club against Milton Keynes Dons on 7 December. In October 2004, he joined Torquay United on loan and in December 2004 moved to Torquay for a club record fee of an initial £75,000, which depending on additional clauses could have risen to £100,000 and included a sell-on fee of 25%.

Despite scoring a hat-trick in a 3–1 win at former club Brentford on 26 December, his form was disappointing for Torquay. He scored just seven times in 38 appearances and was transfer-listed in October 2005 by Torquay manager Leroy Rosenior, along with Darren Garner, Mamadou Sow, Carl Priso, Morike Sako and Nick Skinner.

=== Port Vale ===
Constantine moved to Port Vale on loan on 4 November 2005, with the transfer becoming permanent for a fee of £20,000 in January 2006. On 8 November 2006, he opened the scoring against Tottenham Hotspur in a League Cup tie at White Hart Lane, though Spurs went on to win the game 3–1 in extra time. In the 2006–07 season he broke a record, becoming the only Port Vale player to score more than 17 goals before Christmas. This happened when he scored twice against Brighton & Hove Albion on 23 December 2006.

He was set to move to Championship club Barnsley in the January 2007 transfer window, Vale agreeing a fee of £200,000 plus Marc Richards. However, the deal fell through when neither club could agree terms. In January 2007, Brighton offered Vale £150,000 for the striker, but Constantine insisted he was happy at Vale Park. Despite finishing the season with 26 goals in all competitions for Port Vale (38 in 18 months for the club), he was never a fan favourite at Vale Park. Instead, he picked up a vocal minority of detractors who condemned his relaxed attitude on the pitch as proof of him being "lazy".

=== Leeds United ===
Constantine had been linked with several League One clubs throughout pre-season; however, he agreed a contract in principle with Leeds United when they were in administration, paying out of his own pocket to take part in the pre-season programme. Leeds later signed a two-year contract with Constantine on 7 August 2007. Constantine started his first game for Leeds in the 2–1 defeat to Bury in the Football League Trophy where he scored in the 8th minute. His career at Leeds was blighted by injury, however, leading to him only making a handful of appearances for the club.

Constantine scored his first league goal for Leeds in their 3–1 home defeat at the hands of Oldham Athletic on 1 January 2008. However, he was hit by injury again, breaking his arm in this same game after scoring, leading to a two-month lay-off. In March, Constantine was sent to Oldham on loan to help him re-gain match fitness, scoring twice in seven appearances.

=== Northampton Town ===
On 2 July, Constantine completed a free transfer move to League One side Northampton Town after falling out of favour with Gary McAllister. After only scoring three goals for Northampton and receiving boos from the club's own fans, he joined League One rivals Cheltenham Town on a one-month loan on 20 March 2009. He returned to Northampton on 20 April after scoring one goal against Huddersfield Town in six matches.

=== Hereford United ===
Having been released by Northampton, Constantine signed for Hereford United on a one-year contract on 29 June 2009, becoming the first striker signed by new coach John Trewick following his clear out of club's playing staff. He was released at the end of the season following a disappointing year.

=== York City ===
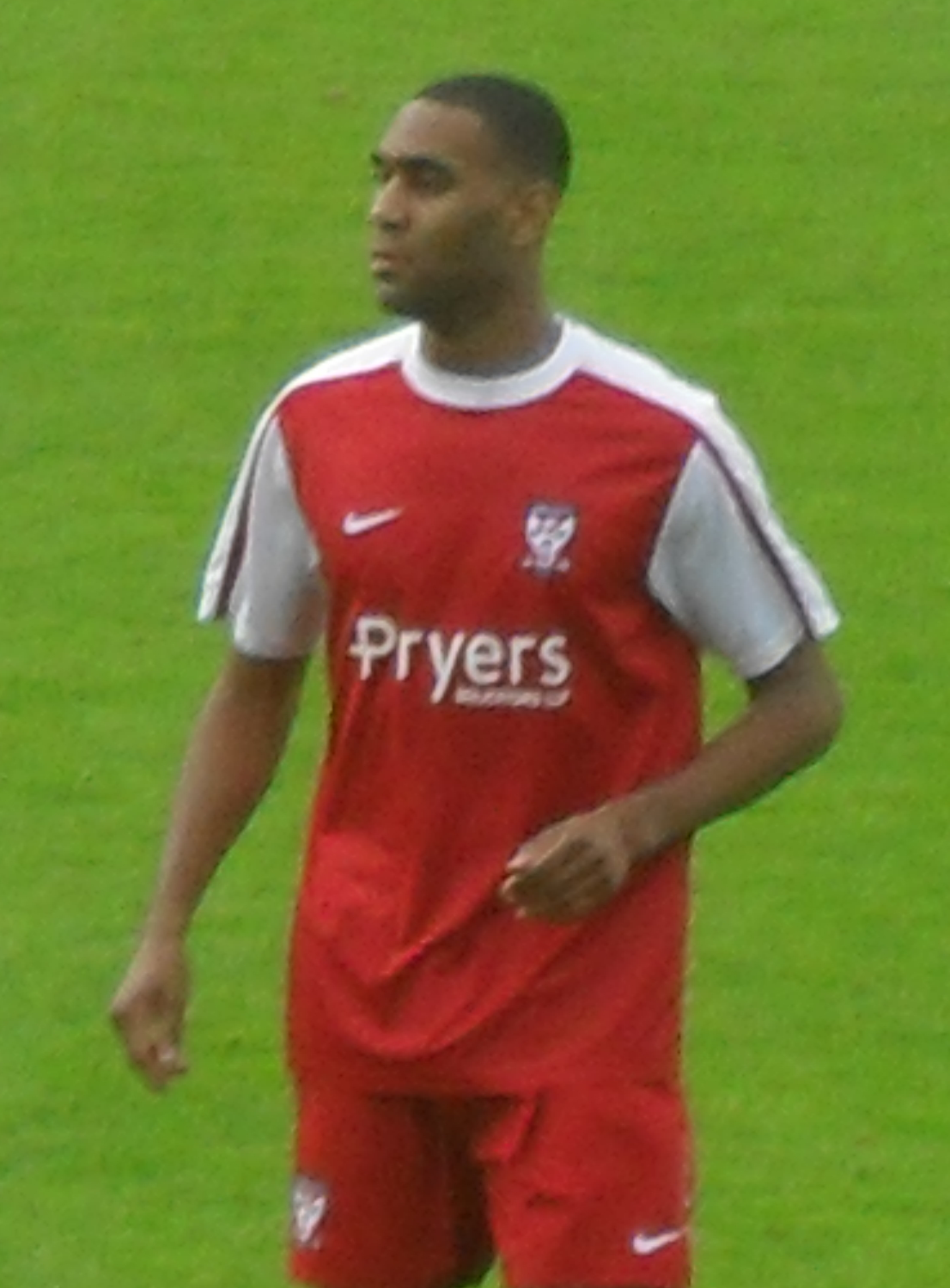
Constantine playing for York City in 2010

He joined Conference Premier side York City on a contract until the end of the 2010–11 season on 3 September 2010, teaming up with his former manager at Port Vale, Martin Foyle. The next day he made his debut, scoring the second goal in a 2–0 victory over Rushden & Diamonds. Constantine scored on his first start for York with the second goal in a 2–0 victory over Hayes & Yeading United on 18 September. Having finished the season with eight goals in 29 appearances, York released him on 23 June 2011.

=== Later career ===
Constantine had an unsuccessful trial with League Two club Barnet in July and played in a pre-season friendly against Peterborough. He then went on trial with newly-promoted Conference Premier side Braintree Town and recorded a goal and an assist in a game against Billericay Town. Constantine completed a permanent move to Braintree after training with them in pre-season and made his debut when he appeared as a second-half substitute in Braintree's 5–0 win over Grimsby Town. Constantine failed to make a further appearance for Braintree and was released in October.

He signed with Isthmian League Premier Division side Lewes, for whom he made one league appearance against Canvey Island on 8 October. This was followed by a spell with fellow Isthmian League Premier Division side Tooting & Mitcham United, playing one game against Metropolitan Police on 19 November. He then signed for Boston United of the Conference North on a contract until the end of the 2011–12 season, making his debut as a substitute in the side's 4–2 Boxing Day victory at home to Eastwood Town. He was released by the club on 11 March 2012, having scored one goal in two starts and eight substitute appearances. He later had spells in the Spartan South Midlands League playing for Arlesey Town, Brimsdown and Enfield Borough.

== Personal and later life ==
Constantine is an Arsenal supporter. After retiring as a player, he went on to work as a football consultant at a sports agency company and opened his own football academy. He represented former Port Vale youth team player Rhys Walters.

== Career statistics ==
Club	Season	League			National cup (Note: Includes FA Cup, Scottish Cup)		League cup (Note: Includes Football League Cup, Scottish League Cup)		Other		Total	
Club	Season	Division	Apps	Goals	Apps	Goals	Apps	Goals	Apps	Goals	Apps	Goals
Millwall	2000–01	Second Division	1	0	0	0	0	0	1 (Note: Appearance(s) in Football League Trophy)	0	2	0
Millwall	2001–02	First Division	0	0	0	0	0	0	—		0	0
Millwall	Total		1	0	0	0	0	0	1	0	2	0
Leyton Orient (loan)	2001–02	Third Division	10	3	0	0	0	0	1	0	11	3
Partick Thistle (loan)	2001–02	Scottish First Division	2	0	1	0	0	0	0	0	3	0
Brentford	2002–03	Second Division	17	0	0	0	2	0	0	0	19	0
Southend United	2003–04	Third Division	43	21	3	0	0	0	7	4	53	25
Peterborough United	2004–05	League One	11	1	0	0	0	0	1	0	12	1
Torquay United (loan)	2004–05	League One	4	3	1	0	0	0	0	0	5	3
Torquay United	2004–05	League One	23	6	0	0	0	0	0	0	23	6
Torquay United	2005–06	League Two	15	1	0	0	1	0	1	0	17	1
Torquay United	Total		42	10	1	0	1	0	1	0	45	10
Port Vale (loan)	2005–06	League One	9	3	3	2	—		0	0	12	5
Port Vale	2005–06	League One	21	7	2	0	0	0	0	0	23	7
Port Vale	2006–07	League One	42	22	2	0	4	2	2	2	50	26
Port Vale	Total		72	32	7	2	4	2	2	2	85	38
Leeds United	2007–08	League One	4	1	2	0	0	0	1	1	7	2
Oldham Athletic (loan)	2007–08	League One	8	2	—		—		—		8	2
Northampton Town	2008–09	League One	32	2	2	0	2	0	1	0	37	2
Cheltenham Town (loan)	2008–09	League One	6	1	—		—		—		6	1
Hereford United	2009–10	League Two	35	6	1	0	1	0	3	2	40	8
York City	2010–11	Conference Premier	26	8	2	0	—		1 (Note: Appearance in FA Trophy)	0	29	8
Braintree Town	2011–12	Conference Premier	1	0	0	0	—		0	0	1	0
Lewes	2011–12	Isthmian League; Premier Division	1	0	0	0	—		0	0	1	0
Tooting & Mitcham United	2011–12	Isthmian League; Premier Division	1	0	0	0	—		0	0	1	0
Boston United	2011–12	Conference North	9	0	0	0	—		1	1	10	1
Arlesey Town	2011–12	Southern League; Premier Division	5	0	0	0	—		0	0	5	0
Brimsdown	2014–15	Spartan South Midlands; League Division Two	23	3	0	0	—		1 (Note: Appearance in Challenge Trophy)	0	24	3
Brimsdown	2015–16	Spartan South Midlands; League Division One	3	1	0	0	—		2	0	5	1
Brimsdown	Total		26	4	0	0	0	0	3	0	29	4
Enfield Borough	2016–17	Spartan South Midlands; League Division Two	4	0	0	0	—		0	0	4	0
Career total			356	91	19	2	10	2	23	10	408	105

== Honours ==
Southend United

- Football League Trophy runner-up: 2003–04

Individual

- Football League One Player of the Month: August 2006
