= Jeff Smith (footballer, born 1980) =

English footballer

Personal information
- Full name: Jeffrey Smith
- Date of birth: 28 June 1980 (age 46)
- Place of birth: Middlesbrough, England
- Height: 5 ft 10 in (1.78 m)
- Positions: Defender; midfielder

Youth career
- Middlesbrough

Senior career*
Years	Team	Apps	(Gls)
1998–1999	Hartlepool United	3	(0)
1999	Barrow		
1999–2001	Bishop Auckland		
2001–2004	Bolton Wanderers	2	(0)
2001–2002	→ Macclesfield Town (loan)	8	(2)
2004	→ Scunthorpe United (loan)	1	(0)
2004	→ Rochdale (loan)	1	(0)
2004	Preston North End	5	(0)
2004–2007	Port Vale	88	(5)
2007–2009	Carlisle United	55	(2)
2009–2010	Darlington	24	(0)
2010–2011	Olympic Charleroi	12	(1)
2011–2012	Whitby Town	22	(2)
2012–201?	Celtic Nation		
Total		221	(12)
- * Club domestic league appearances and goals

Jeffrey Smith (born 28 June 1980) is an English former footballer who played as a midfielder.

Smith started his career with Hartlepool United in 1998, but a year later moved on to Barrow, and shortly after Bishop Auckland. After two years at Bishop Auckland, he was signed by Bolton Wanderers. Rarely used by Bolton, he was instead loaned out to Macclesfield Town, Scunthorpe United, and Rochdale, and then took a free transfer to Preston North End, before he signed permanently with Port Vale in 2004. A regular in the first team at Vale, he left after three years to sign with Carlisle United. In 2009, he joined Darlington but only spent one season at the club. In August 2010, he moved to Belgium to play for one season with Olympic Charleroi, before he returned to England with Whitby Town a year later. In July 2012, he joined Celtic Nation.

== Career ==
=== Early career ===
Smith spent part of his youth on the books at Middlesbrough, though he was not offered a YTS place. He went on to work at a sports shop after leaving school whilst playing Sunday League football. He started his professional career at Hartlepool United in 1998 and featured three times at left-back in the Third Division under Mick Tait and once in the Football League Trophy under caretaker managers Paul Baker and Brian Honour. However, he fell out of the first-team picture after Chris Turner took charge in February 1999. He left Victoria Park in the summer after an initial one-year contract offer was replaced by a three-month deal. After his release, Smith joined non-League team Barrow, but played only one game before moving on to Bishop Auckland. He worked as a postman during his time out of the Football League.

=== Bolton Wanderers ===
Smith's performances at Bishop Auckland were much improved, and he was hailed as one of the best crossers in non-league football. In March 2001, Smith joined Football League First Division club Bolton Wanderers on a short contract deal after impressing during a week-long trial. Bolton paid Bishop Auckland a £25,000 transfer fee, rising by another £5,000 following appearances clauses. Smith wanted to show Wanderers manager Sam Allardyce that he could make the grade in the Football League. Smith played in the final league match of the 2000–01 season, a 1–1 draw against Sheffield United.

He signed a new contract following Bolton's promotion to the Premier League. Still, he struggled to get into the first team, playing a few League Cup matches. Smith was loaned to Macclesfield Town for two months to gain some experience in December 2001 and scored two goals in eight league games. Macclesfield manager David Moss had the initial month-long loan extended into a second month. He still struggled to get into the first team at Bolton, playing in one Premier League match away to West Ham United, again the last game of the season.

In the two following seasons, Smith played only a handful of League Cup and FA Cup matches and was loaned out to Scunthorpe United and Rochdale. Wanderers released him in the summer. His loan at Rochdale was cut short so he could join Preston North End on a free transfer as they took on his Bolton contract until the end of the 2003–04 season.

=== Port Vale ===
In June 2004, Smith joined Port Vale on a one-year contract. He was a first-team regular during his first season at the club. Vale offered Smith a new contract, which he accepted. Smith was again in and around the first-team throughout the 2005–06 season, and signed a new one-year deal at the end of the campaign. Smith started the first half of the 2006–07 season very strongly, attracting interest from other clubs.

=== Carlisle United ===
In January 2007, Smith joined Carlisle United for a fee of £60,000 on a 2 1/2-year contract. Smith made his Carlisle début in a goalless draw at Brentford, scoring his first goal at Doncaster Rovers a week later. He was injured in a 2–1 win over Luton Town after coming on as a substitute, causing him to be replaced himself. This was his last game of the campaign. Smith was released from Carlisle at the end of 2008–09 after having played just twenty games all season, with the club narrowly avoiding relegation out of League One.

=== Darlington ===
He was signed by League Two's Darlington manager Colin Todd in June 2009. Darlington had a poor season. They were relegated from the English Football League, 18 points from safety, and lost 32 of their 46 games. He played regularly under new manager Steve Staunton, though the club cancelled his contract following a breach of club rules on 19 March 2010.

=== Later career ===
In July 2010 he went on trial at Scottish Premier League side Aberdeen, but was not offered a contract. The following month he signed a two-year contract with Olympic Charleroi of the Belgian Third Division B. After one season of football in Belgium, he returned to England and spent July 2011 on trial at Rotherham United. In November, he joined up with Whitby Town in the Northern Premier League Premier Division. Darren Williams' "Seasiders" finished the 2011–12 season in 17th place, six points above the relegation zone. In July 2012, he signed with Celtic Nation of the Northern League Division One.

== Career statistics ==
Appearances and goals by club, season and competition
Club	Season	League			National cup (Note: Includes FA Cup, Belgian Cup)		League cup (Note: Includes Football League Cup)		Other		Total	
Club	Season	Division	Apps	Goals	Apps	Goals	Apps	Goals	Apps	Goals	Apps	Goals
Hartlepool United	1998–99	Third Division	3	0	0	0	0	0	1 (Note: Appearance(s) in the Football League Trophy.)	0	4	0
Bolton Wanderers	2000–01	First Division	1	0	0	0	0	0	0	0	1	0
Bolton Wanderers	2001–02	Premier League	1	0	0	0	1	0	0	0	2	0
Bolton Wanderers	2002–03	Premier League	0	0	2	0	1	0	0	0	3	0
Bolton Wanderers	2003–04	Premier League	0	0	2	0	0	0	0	0	2	0
Bolton Wanderers	Total		2	0	4	0	2	0	0	0	8	0
Macclesfield Town (loan)	2001–02	Third Division	8	2	0	0	0	0	0	0	8	2
Scunthorpe United (loan)	2003–04	Third Division	1	0	0	0	0	0	0	0	1	0
Rochdale (loan)	2003–04	Third Division	1	0	—		—		—		1	0
Preston North End	2003–04	First Division	5	0	—		—		—		5	0
Port Vale	2004–05	League One	34	1	2	0	1	0	2	0	39	1
Port Vale	2005–06	League One	27	1	2	0	0	0	1	1	30	2
Port Vale	2006–07	League One	27	3	2	0	4	1	1	0	34	4
Port Vale	Total		88	5	6	0	5	1	4	1	103	7
Carlisle United	2006–07	League One	17	1	—		—		—		17	1
Carlisle United	2007–08	League One	22	1	2	0	2	0	2	0	28	1
Carlisle United	2008–09	League One	16	0	3	0	1	0	0	0	20	0
Carlisle United	Total		55	2	5	0	3	0	2	0	65	2
Darlington	2009–10	League Two	24	0	1	0	1	0	2	0	28	0
Olympic Charleroi	2010–11	Third Division B	12	1	0	0	—		0	0	12	1
Whitby Town	2011–12	Northern Premier League; Premier Division	22	2	0	0	—		1	0	23	2
Career total (Note: Barrow, Bishop Auckland, and Celtic Nation statistics not known.)			221	12	16	0	11	1	10	1	258	14

== Honours ==
Bishop Auckland

- Durham Challenge Cup: 2001
