= 2010–11 Northern Premier League =

The 2010–11 season was the 43rd season of the Northern Premier League Premier Division, and the fourth season of the Northern Premier League Division One North and South.

The allocations of teams following the 2009–10 season were released on 17 May 2010. The League sponsors from 2010–11 are Evo-Stik, who took over from Henkel UniBond.

== Premier Division ==
Northern Premier League Premier Division
- Season: 2010–11
- Champions: FC Halifax Town
- Promoted: FC Halifax Town; Colwyn Bay
- Relegated: Hucknall Town; Ossett Town; Retford United
- Matches: 462
- Goals: 1,486 (3.22 per match)
- Top goalscorer: Ross Hannah (35)
- Biggest home win: 7 goals: Buxton 7–0 Retford United (2 October 2010); FC Halifax Town 8–1 Ossett Town (18 December 2010)
- Biggest away win: 6 goals: Colwyn Bay 0–6 Northwich Victoria (9 October 2010); Marine 0–6 FC Halifax Town (6 November 2010); Ossett Town 0–6 Bradford Park Avenue (1 January 2011); Nantwich Town 0–6 FC Halifax Town (22 February 2011)
- Highest scoring: Mickleover Sports 6–6 Nantwich Town (27 November 2010)
- Highest attendance: 4,023; FC Halifax Town 4–1; F.C. United of Manchester (1 January 2011)
- Lowest attendance: 58; Ossett Town 1–2 Mickleover Sports (12 April 2011)

The Premier Division featured five new clubs:

- Chasetown, promoted via play-offs from NPL Division One South
- Colwyn Bay, promoted via play-offs from NPL Division One North
- FC Halifax Town, promoted as champions from NPL Division One North
- Mickleover Sports, promoted as champions from NPL Division One South
- Northwich Victoria, demoted under financial rules from the Conference North

=== League table ===
Pos	Team	Pld	W	D	L	GF	GA	GD	Pts	Promotion or relegation
1	FC Halifax Town (C, P)	42	30	8	4	108	36	+72	98	Promotion to Conference North
2	Colwyn Bay (P)	42	24	7	11	67	56	+11	79	Qualification for Playoffs
3	Bradford Park Avenue	42	23	8	11	84	55	+29	77	Qualification for Playoffs
4	F.C. United of Manchester	42	24	4	14	76	53	+23	76	Qualification for Playoffs
5	North Ferriby United	42	22	7	13	78	51	+27	73	Qualification for Playoffs
6	Buxton	42	20	10	12	71	52	+19	70	
7	Kendal Town	42	21	5	16	80	77	+3	68	
8	Marine	42	20	7	15	74	64	+10	67	
9	Worksop Town	42	21	6	15	72	54	+18	66 (Note: Worksop Town deducted three points for fielding an ineligible player.)	
10	Chasetown	42	20	6	16	76	59	+17	66	
11	Matlock Town	42	20	6	16	74	59	+15	66	
12	Northwich Victoria	42	18	9	15	66	55	+11	63	
13	Stocksbridge Park Steels	42	17	6	19	75	75	0	57	
14	Ashton United	42	16	5	21	57	62	−5	53	
15	Mickleover Sports	42	15	7	20	70	76	−6	52	
16	Whitby Town	42	14	9	19	58	77	−19	51	
17	Nantwich Town	42	13	7	22	68	90	−22	46	
18	Frickley Athletic	42	11	11	20	43	68	−25	44	
19	Burscough	42	12	7	23	56	73	−17	43 (Note: Burscough were reprieved due to Ilkeston Town folding.)	
20	Hucknall Town (R)	42	11	10	21	57	80	−23	43	Relegation to NPL Division One South
21	Ossett Town (R)	42	9	5	28	45	103	−58	32	Relegation to NPL Division One North
22	Retford United (R)	42	5	2	35	31	111	−80	17 (Note: Retford resigned from the NPL at the end of the season and so were relegated 2 levels.)	Relegation to NCEFL Premier Division

Updated to match(es) played on 29 April 2011. Source: Evo-Stik League
Rules for classification: 1) points; 2) goal difference; 3) number of goals scored.
(C) Champions; (P) Promoted; (R) Relegated

=== Results grid ===
Home \ Away	ASH	BPA	BUR	BUX	CHA	COL	HAL	FCU	FRK	HUC	KEN	MAR	MAT	MIC	NAN	NFU	NOR	OST	RET	STO	WTB	WKS
Ashton United		1–3	1–0	2–1	2–3	3–0	0–3	1–0	3–6	4–0	1–2	1–0	3–1	2–3	2–4	0–1	2–1	0–1	1–0	3–1	1–3	3–1
Bradford Park Avenue	2–0		3–1	4–1	2–1	1–4	1–3	4–1	2–3	6–0	5–2	2–1	3–1	1–0	1–0	1–2	2–2	0–1	2–0	3–0	1–1	4–0
Burscough	4–1	2–3		1–2	0–3	0–0	0–2	0–2	3–0	3–0	2–4	1–2	0–3	3–2	3–1	2–2	0–0	0–1	0–1	0–2	1–0	3–1
Buxton	1–1	1–1	1–0		2–0	0–0	2–1	2–2	7–1	4–0	3–0	2–1	1–3	1–2	2–1	0–0	2–2	2–0	7–0	0–0	2–0	0–1
Chasetown	2–1	5–0	5–0	0–1		2–2	2–1	2–0	2–0	1–0	0–1	0–1	2–1	2–3	2–2	2–2	1–0	1–0	6–0	0–2	1–1	2–6
Colwyn Bay	0–3	2–2	2–1	2–1	1–0		2–1	3–1	4–0	2–0	2–1	0–3	0–1	1–1	2–0	0–2	0–6	3–1	1–0	3–4	2–0	2–1
FC Halifax Town	1–0	1–0	3–2	2–1	3–2	1–1		4–1	3–1	4–0	3–0	1–0	2–2	1–1	3–1	0–2	1–1	8–1	3–0	5–1	5–1	0–0
F.C. United of Manchester	2–1	2–0	3–1	1–2	4–2	0–1	0–1		4–1	4–1	1–2	2–1	1–5	0–0	1–0	2–0	1–0	4–1	5–1	1–4	4–0	2–1
Frickley Athletic	0–0	2–2	0–1	2–2	2–1	0–1	0–0	0–0		1–0	0–2	2–3	0–1	1–0	3–0	0–1	2–1	0–1	1–2	1–1	0–0	1–0
Hucknall Town	0–0	2–2	2–2	0–1	2–2	0–1	1–2	1–2	2–0		4–3	0–3	2–2	1–0	3–1	3–2	0–2	3–3	5–3	2–2	1–2	1–2
Kendal Town	1–0	4–1	1–2	1–1	4–0	1–4	2–4	3–2	1–0	0–0		2–1	1–0	1–2	2–1	2–5	1–1	5–4	4–1	2–3	2–1	2–1
Marine	4–0	1–0	2–2	1–2	2–0	1–3	0–6	0–2	1–1	1–1	2–0		2–4	1–2	4–3	2–3	3–1	4–3	2–0	5–4	1–3	2–4
Matlock Town	1–1	0–1	2–1	1–3	3–4	3–0	1–2	1–2	1–0	1–2	3–1	0–1		1–2	4–2	2–1	1–1	2–0	4–2	1–0	2–2	1–0
Mickleover Sports	0–1	1–3	2–1	2–4	1–3	4–0	2–3	2–0	3–0	1–1	1–3	0–0	1–0		6–6	3–4	2–3	2–4	4–1	2–0	2–4	0–1
Nantwich Town	0–2	0–1	3–2	1–1	0–4	2–1	0–6	1–4	4–3	1–2	5–3	1–1	2–3	0–0		2–1	2–1	2–1	1–0	4–2	3–1	1–2
North Ferriby United	3–2	1–2	2–1	2–0	0–1	1–3	0–3	1–1	4–0	3–0	4–1	0–1	3–1	4–2	1–2		1–2	4–0	0–1	2–1	6–0	3–0
Northwich Victoria	1–0	2–1	3–0	4–2	1–1	0–1	0–3	1–0	0–1	4–0	1–6	4–3	2–3	1–0	1–1	1–1		0–1	4–1	0–1	2–0	3–1
Ossett Town	0–5	0–6	1–2	0–1	2–4	2–3	0–0	0–3	1–2	1–6	0–0	0–2	0–0	1–2	0–5	0–0	0–2		2–1	3–5	0–4	2–3
Retford United	1–2	0–0	0–2	1–3	0–4	3–5	0–2	0–4	1–3	2–5	2–1	0–3	0–4	0–2	3–2	1–2	0–1	0–2		0–0	0–3	0–3
Stocksbridge Park Steels	0–0	0–1	2–4	1–4	2–0	0–1	3–5	1–2	1–1	1–0	2–1	1–3	3–1	7–3	3–1	0–1	3–0	3–0	3–2		2–1	2–3
Whitby Town	2–1	1–2	2–2	1–0	0–1	2–2	1–5	0–1	2–2	1–0	2–2	1–1	1–2	3–2	3–1	0–1	2–4	3–1	2–1	2–0		0–3
Worksop Town	3–0	3–3	1–1	3–0	2–0	0–1	1–1	1–2	1–1	2–0	1–2	1–2	2–1	2–0	0–0	4–1	2–0	1–4	1–0	2–1	5–0	

Updated to match(es) played on 25 April 2011. Source: Evo-Stik League Premier Division Results
Legend: Blue = home team win; Yellow = draw; Red = away team win.

=== Play-offs ===
Semifinals
2	Colwyn Bay	2
5	North Ferriby United	0
3	Bradford Park Avenue	0
4	F.C. United of Manchester	2

Final
2	Colwyn Bay	1
4	F.C. United of Manchester	0

=== Stadia and Locations ===
Locations of the 2010–11 Northern Premier League Premier Division teams

Team	Stadium	Capacity
F.C. United of Manchester	Gigg Lane (Bury ground share)	11,840
FC Halifax Town	The Shay	10,061
Buxton	The Silverlands	5,200
Northwich Victoria	Victoria Stadium	5,098
Bradford Park Avenue	Horsfall Stadium	5,000
Hucknall Town	Watnall Road	5,000
Ashton United	Hurst Cross	4,500
Nantwich Town	The Weaver Stadium	3,500
Stocksbridge Park Steels	Look Local Stadium	3,500
Whitby Town	Turnbull Ground	3,500
Burscough	Victoria Park	3,054
Marine	The Arriva Stadium	2,800
North Ferriby United	Grange Lane	2,700
Colwyn Bay	Llanelian Road	2,500
Kendal Town	Lakeland Radio Stadium	2,400
Matlock Town	Causeway Lane	2,214
Frickley Athletic	Westfield Lane	2,087
Chasetown	The Scholars Ground	2,000
Ossett Town	Ingfield	2,000
Retford United	Cannon Park	2,000
Worksop Town	Cannon Park (Retford ground share)	2,000
Mickleover Sports	Mickleover Sports Ground	1,500

=== Top scorers ===
Pos	Player	Team	Goals
1	(England) Ross Hannah	Matlock Town	35
2	(England) Jamie Rainford	Marine	28
3=	(England) Mike Norton	F.C. United of Manchester	24
3=	(England) Jamie Vardy	FC Halifax Town	24
5=	(England) Gary Bradshaw	North Ferriby United	23
5=	(England) Ben Tomlinson	Worksop Town	23
7	(England) Aaron Burns	Ashton United	22
8	(England) Michael Lennon	Nantwich Town	20
9	(England) Mark Reed	Buxton	19
10=	(England) Alex Davidson	North Ferriby United	18
10=	(England) Tom Greaves	Bradford Park Avenue	18
10=	(England) Danny Holland	FC Halifax Town	18
10=	(England) Kieran Lugsden	Buxton	18

== Division One North ==
Northern Premier League Division One North
- Season: 2010–11
- Champions: Chester
- Promoted: Chester; Chorley
- Matches: 506
- Goals: 1,707 (3.37 per match)
- Top goalscorer: Michael Wilde (36) (29 April 2011)
- Biggest home win: Skelmersdale United 8–0 Cammell Laird (13 November 2010)
- Biggest away win: Leigh Genesis 0–8 Witton Albion (11 January 2011)
- Highest scoring: Cammell Laird 4–8 Harrogate Railway Athletic (3 January 2011)
- Highest attendance: 3,307; Chester 2–0 Bamber Bridge (23 April 2011)
- Lowest attendance: 50; Woodley Sports 2–4 Harrogate Railway Athletic (19 April 2011)

The Division One North featured four new clubs:

- Cammell Laird, transferred from the NPL Division One South
- Durham City, relegated from the NPL Premier Division
- Witton Albion, transferred from the NPL Division One South
- Chester were also admitted to Division One North, after appealing against an earlier decision to demote the club to the North West Counties League after their expulsion from the Conference Premier. Chester's participation was confirmed at the League's AGM on 19 June 2010. At the same meeting it was decided that the division would feature 23 clubs. There will, however, only be two relegation places in the league this year.

=== League table ===
Pos	Team	Pld	W	D	L	GF	GA	GD	Pts	Promotion or relegation
1	Chester (C, P)	44	29	10	5	107	36	+71	97	Promotion to NPL Premier Division
2	Skelmersdale United	44	30	7	7	117	48	+69	97	Qualification for Playoffs
3	Chorley (P)	44	25	11	8	87	43	+44	86	Qualification for Playoffs
4	Curzon Ashton	44	25	10	9	85	49	+36	85	Qualification for Playoffs
5	AFC Fylde	44	24	9	11	91	59	+32	81	Qualification for Playoffs
6	Clitheroe	44	19	13	12	82	70	+12	70	
7	Bamber Bridge	44	20	10	14	70	60	+10	70	
8	Lancaster City	44	21	5	18	80	61	+19	68	
9	Warrington Town	44	18	16	10	70	52	+18	67 (Note: Warrington Town deducted 3 points for fielding ineligible players.)	
10	Witton Albion	44	15	17	12	75	64	+11	62	
11	Woodley Sports	44	17	11	16	71	75	−4	62	
12	Salford City	44	17	11	16	68	73	−5	62	
13	Garforth Town	44	13	13	18	67	71	−4	52	
14	Trafford	44	15	7	22	73	92	−19	52	
15	Mossley	44	14	9	21	75	77	−2	51	
16	Wakefield	44	14	8	22	55	74	−19	50	
17	Durham City	44	13	10	21	75	92	−17	48 (Note: Durham City deducted 1 point for fielding an ineligible player.)	
18	Radcliffe Borough	44	12	12	20	60	89	−29	48	
19	Cammell Laird	44	13	8	23	66	94	−28	47	
20	Harrogate Railway Athletic	44	13	7	24	82	103	−21	46	
21	Prescot Cables	44	9	15	20	52	79	−27	42	
22	Ossett Albion	44	6	11	27	60	134	−74	26 (Note: Ossett Albion deducted 3 points for fielding ineligible players and reprieved due to Enfield 1893 being denied promotion to the Isthmian League)	
23	Leigh Genesis	44	5	8	31	39	112	−73	23	Club folded at end of season

Updated to match(es) played on 29 April 2011. Source: Evo-Stik League
Rules for classification: 1) points; 2) goal difference; 3) number of goals scored.
(C) Champions; (P) Promoted

=== Results grid ===
Home \ Away	FYL	BAM	CAM	CHR	CHO	CLT	CZA	DUR	GAR	HRA	LNC	LEG	MOS	OSA	PRC	RAD	SLC	SKU	TRA	WAK	WAR	WTN	WDL
AFC Fylde		0–2	1–1	1–3	3–0	0–1	3–1	4–2	1–0	5–2	4–1	4–0	0–2	2–0	2–1	5–2	3–1	2–3	3–2	4–0	3–0	1–1	3–2
Bamber Bridge	3–2		1–0	0–5	1–1	1–2	2–0	1–0	1–1	2–3	2–1	3–0	2–2	5–0	0–1	2–1	2–2	0–0	1–2	4–1	1–1	3–3	2–1
Cammell Laird	0–3	2–4		1–2	1–1	3–0	2–5	4–2	3–2	4–8	2–1	0–0	1–2	5–1	2–2	4–0	3–3	0–2	1–0	3–2	2–3	0–1	1–2
Chester	2–2	2–0	2–0		1–2	5–0	2–2	3–1	2–0	3–2	3–0	1–1	3–0	6–0	1–1	2–3	3–1	4–0	6–0	3–1	2–2	0–0	3–0
Chorley	0–0	2–0	3–0	0–1		1–1	1–0	5–0	1–2	1–2	2–1	3–1	2–1	2–1	5–2	4–1	1–0	2–0	0–1	2–1	0–3	2–2	6–0
Clitheroe	2–2	1–1	3–3	0–5	0–2		0–3	4–1	3–3	3–3	2–0	6–0	5–0	2–2	2–0	2–0	4–5	2–2	2–3	2–3	2–2	3–1	0–1
Curzon Ashton	1–1	2–2	3–0	3–1	2–6	0–0		4–1	4–1	5–2	0–1	2–0	1–0	7–0	1–1	3–0	1–0	2–3	3–2	3–2	0–2	2–0	3–1
Durham City	1–3	2–1	3–3	0–3	0–3	1–1	1–1		0–0	1–1	5–0	3–1	3–2	4–2	1–1	0–2	6–2	3–3	0–2	3–1	1–3	1–1	6–2
Garforth Town	1–1	0–1	0–1	2–1	1–1	0–1	2–0	1–1		2–6	2–4	3–1	2–1	4–0	0–0	2–2	2–1	0–3	2–1	4–0	3–0	0–0	4–3
Harrogate Railway Athletic	2–3	0–1	5–1	1–4	3–2	1–4	1–2	4–1	1–4		2–3	0–1	4–3	2–3	0–0	2–1	0–1	2–4	3–2	0–1	1–3	1–1	0–2
Lancaster City	2–0	3–1	1–0	2–1	0–2	1–2	0–2	4–0	5–2	4–1		6–0	2–0	4–1	1–2	0–1	0–0	1–0	2–2	2–1	0–4	2–0	2–0
Leigh Genesis	0–1	1–3	1–3	1–1	1–2	1–2	1–2	0–4	1–0	1–2	0–0		1–3	3–3	1–1	2–1	0–3	2–3	3–2	0–1	3–3	0–8	2–3
Mossley	2–0	0–1	1–2	0–1	1–3	3–2	1–1	0–2	2–1	3–0	2–4	0–2		4–0	1–2	1–1	1–3	1–4	6–0	3–0	1–1	3–3	0–0
Ossett Albion	2–5	2–6	3–2	0–3	2–2	1–1	2–3	2–1	1–1	2–2	0–4	2–1	1–1		1–3	3–3	6–2	2–5	2–0	1–1	1–3	1–3	2–5
Prescot Cables	0–1	0–2	1–1	0–1	0–2	1–2	2–1	3–4	1–1	1–2	0–4	4–0	1–5	2–2		2–0	1–2	1–4	2–2	0–1	3–1	1–2	2–2
Radcliffe Borough	1–1	1–0	0–2	2–2	1–2	2–3	0–0	0–3	2–5	1–0	2–2	3–2	0–4	4–1	1–1		1–1	1–4	5–3	0–0	1–0	1–2	2–3
Salford City	3–1	1–2	1–0	0–4	0–2	2–3	0–1	4–0	1–2	1–1	2–2	2–0	2–2	1–0	0–0	1–2		0–5	2–2	2–1	1–2	1–0	1–1
Skelmersdale United	1–3	6–0	8–0	0–1	1–1	1–2	1–1	2–0	1–0	1–0	2–1	4–0	4–0	7–2	3–0	2–2	2–2		5–2	2–1	1–2	6–1	1–0
Trafford	1–4	0–2	4–1	0–2	0–4	1–1	0–2	3–1	2–2	5–2	1–0	4–1	1–4	3–1	1–2	2–0	2–1	0–3		2–0	1–2	1–1	0–1
Wakefield	0–1	1–0	2–1	1–2	2–2	1–0	0–1	1–4	3–2	3–2	2–0	3–0	3–2	1–1	6–0	1–2	1–2	0–2	3–0		1–1	1–1	1–0
Warrington Town	1–1	1–1	0–1	1–1	1–0	0–2	0–1	3–1	2–2	4–0	2–1	2–1	1–1	2–0	2–2	1–2	1–2	0–1	3–1	1–1		2–0	1–1
Witton Albion	3–4	2–0	3–0	2–3	0–0	2–0	1–1	1–1	1–0	2–2	0–5	5–1	2–0	5–0	3–1	3–3	0–1	0–1	2–5	3–1	1–1		2–2
Woodley Sports	2–0	2–1	2–0	1–1	2–2	0–2	3–1	1–0	2–1	2–4	2–1	1–1	3–4	2–1	3–1	4–0	2–3	2–4	2–2	1–1	0–0	0–1	

Updated to match(es) played on 29 April 2011. Source: Evo-Stik League Premier Division Results
Legend: Blue = home team win; Yellow = draw; Red = away team win.

=== Play-offs ===
Semifinals
2	Skelmersdale United	0
5	AFC Fylde	1
3	Chorley	2
4	Curzon Ashton	1

Final
3	Chorley	2
5	AFC Fylde	0

=== Stadia and Locations ===
Locations of the 2010–11 Northern Premier League Division One North teams

Team	Stadium	Capacity
Chester	Deva Stadium	5,376
Witton Albion	Wincham Park	4,813
Chorley	The Chorley Group Victory Park Stadium	4,100
Curzon Ashton	Tameside Stadium	4,000
Mossley	Steel Park	4,000
Wakefield	College Grove	4,000
Harrogate Railway Athletic	Station View	3,500
Lancaster City	Giant Axe	3,500
Radcliffe Borough	Stainton Park	3,500
Warrington Town	Cantilever Park	3,500
Prescot Cables	Valerie Park	3,200
Durham City	The Arnott Stadium	3,000
Garforth Town	Genix Healthcare Stadium	3,000
Ossett Albion	WareHouse Systems Stadium	3,000
Skelmersdale United	Skelmersdale & Ormskirk College Stadium	2,500
Trafford	Shawe View	2,500
Bamber Bridge	QED Stadium	2,264
Clitheroe	Shawbridge	2,000
Woodley Sports	The Neil Rourke Memorial Stadium	2,000
AFC Fylde	Kellamergh Park	1,500
Cammell Laird	Kirklands Stadium	1,500
Leigh Genesis	Crilly Park	1,500
Salford City	Moor Lane	1,400

=== Top scorers ===
Pos	Player	Team	Goals
1	(England) Michael Wilde	Chester	36
2	(England) Chris McDonagh	Curzon Ashton	34
3	(England) Steve Foster	Chorley	31
4	(England) Tom Cahill	AFC Fylde	23
5=	(England) Chris Almond	Skelmersdale United	21
5=	(England) Kristian Dennis	Mossley	21
5=	(England) Andy Kinsey	Witton Albion	21
8=	(England) Nathan Neequaye	Woodley Sports	19
8=	(England) Ryan Wade	Skelmersdale United	19

== Division One South ==
Northern Premier League Division One South
- Season: 2010–11
- Champions: Barwell
- Promoted: Barwell; Rushall Olympic
- Relegated: Spalding United
- Matches: 462
- Goals: 1,571 (3.4 per match)
- Top goalscorer: Ian Holmes (32)
- Biggest home win: 6 goals: Glapwell 7–1 Grantham Town (11 September 2010); Loughborough Dynamo 6–0 Lincoln United (5 October 2010); Market Drayton Town 6–0 Shepshed Dynamo (20 November 2010); Rushall Olympic 6–0 Spalding United (29 January 2011)
- Biggest away win: 7 goals: Market Drayton Town 1–8 Newcastle Town (1 January 2011); Spalding United 0–7 Romulus (12 February 2011)
- Highest scoring: 9 goals: Carlton Town 7–2 Shepshed Dynamo (30 October 2010); Sutton Coldfield Town 7–2 Goole AFC (6 November 2010); Goole AFC 3–6 Carlton Town (13 November 2010); Market Drayton Town 1–8 Newcastle Town (1 January 2011); Belper Town 4–5 Stamford (8 January 2011); Loughborough Dynamo 5–4 Belper Town (15 January 2011); Carlton Town 4–5 Goole AFC (22 January 2011)
- Highest attendance: 467; Sheffield 1–1 Loughborough Dynamo (16 April 2011)
- Lowest attendance: 32; Spalding United 1–1 Sutton Coldfield Town (14 December 2010)

The Division One South featured five new clubs:

- Barwell, promoted as champions from the Midland Alliance
- Newcastle Town, promoted as champions from the North West Counties League Premier Division
- Rainworth Miners Welfare, promoted as runners-up from the Northern Counties East League Premier Division
- Romulus, transferred from the Southern League Division One Midlands
- Sutton Coldfield Town, transferred from the Southern League Division One Midlands

=== League table ===
Pos	Team	Pld	W	D	L	GF	GA	GD	Pts	Promotion or relegation
1	Barwell (C, P)	42	30	4	8	84	46	+38	94	Promotion to Southern League Premier Division
2	Newcastle Town	42	27	9	6	104	48	+56	90	Qualification for Playoffs
3	Rushall Olympic (P)	42	26	3	13	78	45	+33	81	Qualification for Playoffs
4	Brigg Town	42	24	8	10	74	58	+16	80	Qualification for Playoffs
5	Grantham Town	42	23	10	9	69	48	+21	79	Qualification for Playoffs
6	Sutton Coldfield Town	42	23	6	13	89	60	+29	75	
7	Kidsgrove Athletic	42	23	6	13	88	59	+29	75	
8	Carlton Town	42	21	10	11	88	50	+38	73	
9	Glapwell	42	21	6	15	82	58	+24	69	Resigned to CMFL at the end of the season
10	Romulus	42	20	7	15	71	65	+6	67	
11	Sheffield	42	15	10	17	73	86	−13	55	
12	Lincoln United	42	14	12	16	70	77	−7	54	
13	Goole	42	16	6	20	79	93	−14	54	
14	Belper Town	42	16	5	21	70	74	−4	53	
15	Quorn	42	11	14	17	57	61	−4	47	
16	Leek Town	42	14	5	23	64	74	−10	47	
17	Loughborough Dynamo	42	13	7	22	72	89	−17	46	
18	Market Drayton Town	42	13	5	24	67	91	−24	44	
19	Stamford	42	10	12	20	62	74	−12	42	
20	Rainworth Miners Welfare	42	11	7	24	53	85	−32	40	
21	Shepshed Dynamo	42	4	9	29	44	103	−59	21 (Note: Shepshed Dynamo were reprieved due to Rushden and Diamonds' expulsion from the Football Conference.)	
22	Spalding United (R)	42	3	7	32	33	127	−94	16	Relegation to UCL Premier Division

Updated to match(es) played on 29 April 2011. Source: Evo-Stik League
Rules for classification: 1) points; 2) goal difference; 3) number of goals scored.
(C) Champions; (P) Promoted; (R) Relegated

=== Results grid ===
Home \ Away	BAR	BLP	BRG	CAR	GLP	GOO	GRN	KID	LEE	LIN	LOU	MAR	NEW	QON	RAI	ROM	RSO	SHE	SPD	SPA	STM	SUT
Barwell		1–0	3–2	1–2	1–0	4–1	2–1	2–1	2–0	0–4	4–0	4–0	1–1	3–2	3–0	3–1	2–0	3–0	3–3	1–0	2–1	1–0
Belper Town	0–1		0–1	0–0	2–1	0–1	0–2	0–1	3–5	1–1	1–0	5–1	0–5	1–5	2–2	4–1	1–2	2–3	2–1	5–0	4–5	1–4
Brigg Town	0–2	1–2		1–0	2–1	3–0	1–1	2–0	1–1	0–2	1–7	4–3	0–2	4–0	1–1	2–1	4–3	0–0	2–1	2–1	3–2	1–0
Carlton Town	4–2	0–3	1–2		0–0	4–5	2–2	3–3	1–0	3–0	4–0	5–2	0–0	0–0	2–1	0–1	0–0	2–0	7–2	4–0	3–1	2–0
Glapwell	0–1	0–3	0–4	1–0		3–0	7–1	3–0	2–1	4–1	1–2	3–1	1–3	3–0	2–0	5–0	3–5	4–2	1–2	2–1	1–0	0–2
Goole	1–4	0–1	1–3	3–6	1–0		2–1	1–1	4–2	5–1	0–1	1–3	4–4	2–1	5–1	1–2	1–0	2–5	4–1	4–1	1–0	1–2
Grantham Town	5–2	2–1	2–0	1–0	0–0	1–2		2–1	2–0	1–1	2–1	1–2	3–0	1–1	1–3	1–0	1–0	3–1	2–2	0–0	4–1	0–3
Kidsgrove Athletic	0–2	4–2	1–2	2–5	4–0	5–3	1–2		3–2	1–0	2–0	3–1	1–2	2–1	4–0	5–1	2–0	2–2	0–0	3–1	4–3	1–2
Leek Town	2–3	0–2	0–1	2–1	0–2	4–1	2–1	0–1		4–3	3–3	4–0	0–1	1–0	2–3	0–2	1–2	0–2	2–0	2–2	1–0	1–2
Lincoln United	3–2	1–2	2–3	0–2	3–2	0–0	2–5	2–2	1–1		6–1	1–1	1–1	0–0	3–0	2–0	0–1	4–2	1–1	6–1	2–0	1–3
Loughborough Dynamo	0–3	5–4	2–2	1–4	1–4	4–1	1–1	0–3	2–3	6–0		0–1	3–1	2–1	1–2	1–1	2–5	1–3	5–1	5–0	2–2	1–2
Market Drayton Town	2–2	2–4	2–2	0–2	0–1	2–1	0–3	0–1	2–1	2–2	4–0		1–8	0–2	1–2	2–4	0–2	3–1	6–0	3–0	0–3	3–4
Newcastle Town	4–1	2–3	1–2	2–1	3–0	3–1	1–1	3–0	1–2	3–0	3–1	2–1		1–1	4–1	3–1	5–2	1–1	5–2	3–1	4–0	1–2
Quorn	1–2	2–0	0–3	2–1	2–3	3–3	1–2	3–3	0–1	1–2	4–1	1–1	0–0		3–1	2–3	1–0	1–3	0–0	3–0	0–1	2–1
Rainworth Miners Welfare	0–2	0–2	3–2	2–2	1–1	0–1	1–2	0–1	2–1	2–3	1–2	0–2	0–2	1–2		3–5	3–1	0–0	3–2	2–0	2–2	1–2
Romulus	2–1	2–0	0–1	0–1	2–2	0–5	0–1	1–0	2–2	5–1	2–0	2–0	0–2	3–3	3–0		0–0	0–2	4–2	3–2	0–1	2–1
Rushall Olympic	0–1	3–2	2–0	2–1	2–2	3–1	1–0	2–0	2–0	2–1	0–2	2–1	2–3	0–1	2–0	0–1		5–0	2–0	6–0	1–0	3–0
Sheffield	0–3	1–1	5–0	1–1	1–3	2–1	1–2	2–4	4–3	1–1	1–1	2–1	1–4	2–2	1–4	1–3	2–3		3–2	2–1	3–2	2–1
Shepshed Dynamo	1–1	1–0	0–2	1–3	0–5	3–3	0–1	1–4	0–2	0–2	0–1	0–2	0–2	1–1	3–1	1–2	0–2	1–2		5–1	1–4	0–4
Spalding United	1–2	0–1	0–4	0–4	0–2	1–2	0–2	1–6	0–4	2–1	2–2	2–4	3–3	1–1	0–3	0–7	0–3	3–2	2–1		0–4	1–1
Stamford	0–1	2–2	2–3	2–2	2–2	1–1	1–1	0–4	2–1	1–2	1–0	1–3	2–3	1–0	0–0	1–1	0–3	2–2	1–1	6–1		1–1
Sutton Coldfield Town	1–0	3–1	1–1	2–3	2–5	7–2	1–2	0–2	6–1	4–1	3–2	3–2	1–2	1–1	5–1	1–1	1–2	4–2	3–1	1–1	2–1	

Updated to match(es) played on 25 April 2011. Source: Evo-Stik League Premier Division Results
Legend: Blue = home team win; Yellow = draw; Red = away team win.

=== Play-offs ===
Semifinals
2	Newcastle Town	0
5	Grantham Town	3
3	Rushall Olympic	3
4	Brigg Town	0

Final
3	Rushall Olympic	2
5	Grantham Town	0

=== Stadia and Locations ===
Locations of the 2010–11 Northern Premier League Division One South teams

Team	Stadium	Capacity
Grantham Town	South Kesteven Sports Stadium	7,500
Brigg Town	The Hawthorns	4,000
Newcastle Town	Lyme Valley Stadium	4,000
Leek Town	Harrison Park	3,600
Spalding United	Sir Halley Stewart Field	3,500
Goole	Victoria Pleasure Grounds	3,000
Barwell	Kirkby Road	2,500
Shepshed Dynamo	The Dovecote	2,500
Belper Town	Christchurch Meadow	2,400
Lincoln United	Ashby Avenue	2,200
Kidsgrove Athletic	The Seddon Stadium	2,000
Rainworth Miners Welfare	Welfare Ground	2,000
Romulus	The Central Ground (Sutton Coldfield Town ground share)	2,000
Sheffield	Coach and Horses Ground	2,000
Stamford	Vic Couzens Stadium	2,000
Sutton Coldfield Town	The Central Ground	2,000
Glapwell	Hall Corner	1,500
Loughborough Dynamo	Nanpantan Sports Ground	1,500
Rushall Olympic	Dales Lane	1,400
Market Drayton Town	Greenfields Sports Ground	1,000
Carlton Town	Bill Stokeld Stadium	600
Quorn	Sutton Park	400

=== Top scorers ===
Pos	Player	Team	Goals
1	(England) Ian Holmes	Glapwell	32
2	(England) David Walker	Kidsgrove Athletic	30
3	(England) Gavin Allott	Goole AFC	24
4=	(England) Mark Bellingham	Sutton Coldfield Town	23
4=	(England) Jon Froggatt	Belper Town	23
4=	(England) Vill Powell	Goole AFC	23
7	(British Virgin Islands) Jordan Johnson	Newcastle Town	22
8=	(England) Marcus Brown	Romulus	20
8=	(England) Craig Marshall	Sutton Coldfield Town	20
10=	(England) Conor Higginson	Glapwell	18
10=	(England) Ant Lynam	Sheffield	18
10=	(England) Kris Nurse	Quorn	18

== Challenge Cup ==
2010–11 Northern Premier League Challenge Cup
Tournament details
- Country: England; Wales
- Teams: 67

Final positions
- Champions: Ashton United
- Runners-up: Northwich Victoria

Tournament statistics
- Matches played: 66
- Goals scored: 289 (4.38 per match)

The Northern Premier League Challenge Cup 2010–11 (billed as the Evo-Stik Challenge Cup 2010–11 for sponsorship reasons) was the 41st season of the Northern Premier League Challenge Cup, the cup competition of the Northern Premier League. 67 clubs took part. The competition commenced on 21 September 2010. The tournament was won by Ashton United who beat Northwich Victoria 1–0 in the final.

=== Calendar ===
Round	Matches played	Matches	Clubs
Preliminary round	21 September 2010	5	67 → 62
First round	11 October – 18 November 2010	20	62 → 42
Second round	2 November – 14 December 2010	10	42 → 32
Third round	22 November – 25 January 2010	16	32 → 16
Fourth round	1–21 February 2011	8	16 → 8
Quarterfinals	15 February – 7 March 2011	4	8 → 4
Semifinals	17 March – 4 April 2011	2	4 → 2
Final	30 April 2011	1	2 → 1

=== Preliminary round ===
In the preliminary round, the teams that were drawn to play received a bye in the President's Cup.

Tie no	Home team	Score	Away team	Attendance
1	Belper Town	1–5	Glapwell	113
2	Goole AFC	4–3	Harrogate Railway Athletic	100
3	Loughborough Dynamo	4–3	Shepshed Dynamo	125
4	Mossley	1–2	Trafford	152
5	Newcastle Town	3–3	Sutton Coldfield Town	81
Newcastle Town advance 3–2 on penalties

=== First round ===
The five clubs to have made it through the preliminary round were entered into the draw with the rest of the teams from the two Division One leagues.

Tie no	Home team	Score	Away team	Attendance
6	AFC Fylde	3–4	Skelmersdale United	106
7	Bamber Bridge	0–1	Chorley	287
8	Cammell Laird	1–0	Prescot Cables	44
9	Carlton Town	6–0	Brigg Town	56
10	Chester	3–1; AET	Rushall Olympic	966
11	Curzon Ashton	3–1	Leigh Genesis	124
12	Garforth Town	3–2	Ossett Albion	74
13	Goole AFC	3–5	Sheffield	81
14	Grantham Town	6–4	Loughborough Dynamo	62
15	Kidsgrove Athletic	2–2	Leek Town	138
Kidsgrove Athletic 4–1 on penalties

Tie no	Home team	Score	Away team	Attendance
16	Lancaster City	5–2	Clitheroe	133
17	Lincoln United	2–3	Stamford	41
18	Market Drayton Town	2–3	Newcastle Town	125
19	Quorn	3–0	Romulus	66
20	Radcliffe Borough	1–0	Trafford	86
21	Rainworth Miners Welfare	3–4	Barwell	75
22	Spalding United	2–1	Glapwell	55
23	Wakefield	2–2	Durham City	65
Durham City 4–3 on penalties
24	Warrington Town	2–4	Witton Albion	119
25	Woodley Sports	5–1	Salford City	49

=== Second round ===
The twenty clubs to have made it through the first round were entered into the second round draw.

Tie no	Home team	Score	Away team	Attendance
26	Barwell	3–0	Spalding United	101
27	Chorley	2–1; AET	Curzon Ashton	349
28	Kidsgrove Athletic	7–2	Cammell Laird	63
29	Lancaster City	0–1	Radcliffe Borough	103
30	Newcastle Town	2–0	Chester	187

Tie no	Home team	Score	Away team	Attendance
31	Quorn	0–2	Carlton Town	86
32	Sheffield	1–3^{†}	Durham City	55
33	Skelmersdale United	4–0	Witton Albion	102
34	Stamford	0–3	Grantham Town	178
35	Woodley Sports	4–3	Garforth Town	135

^{† Tie reversed after repeatedly failed attempts for match to be played at Sheffield.}

=== Third round ===
The ten clubs to have made it through the second round were entered into the third round draw along with the teams in the Premier Division.

Tie no	Home team	Score	Away team	Attendance
36	Ashton United	3–1	FC United of Manchester	332
37	Barwell	4–1	Retford United	95
38	Bradford Park Avenue	0–3^{*}	FC Halifax Town	72
39	Burscough	1–2	Marine	130
40	Chasetown	2–3	Newcastle Town	157
41	Chorley	1–0	Radcliffe Borough	286
42	Durham City	2–0	Frickley Athletic	56
43	Hucknall Town	2–0	Worksop Town	110

Tie no	Home team	Score	Away team	Attendance
44	Kidsgrove Athletic	0–2	Colwyn Bay	110
45	Matlock Town	3–0	Grantham Town	181
46	Mickleover Sports	2–3	Carlton Town	87
47	Nantwich Town	3–7	Northwich Victoria	181
48	Ossett Town	1–4	Stocksbridge Park Steels	110
49	Skelmersdale United	6–1	Buxton	113
50	Whitby Town	1–3	North Ferriby United	131
51	Woodley Sports	3–1	Kendal Town	50

^{* Bradford Park Avenue re-instated, as FC Halifax Town fielded an ineligible player in the tie between the two sides.}

=== Fourth round ===
The sixteen clubs to have made it through the third round were entered into the fourth round draw.

Tie no	Home team	Score	Away team	Attendance
52	Ashton United	3–2	Marine	75
53	Carlton Town	4–5	Hucknall Town	103
54	Colwyn Bay	2–2	Chorley	181
Colwyn Bay 7–6 on penalties
55	Durham City	1–3	Bradford Park Avenue	82

Tie no	Home team	Score	Away team	Attendance
56	Matlock Town	3–0	Barwell	171
57	Newcastle Town	1–2; AET	Northwich Victoria	109
58	Skelmersdale United	5–0	Woodley Sports	109
59	Stocksbridge Park Steels	3–2	North Ferriby United	54

=== Quarter-finals ===
The eight clubs to have made it through the fourth round were entered into the Quarter-finals draw.

28 February 2011 60	Ashton United	2–1	Colwyn Bay	Hurst Cross, Ashton-under-Lyne
19:45	Crowther 10'; Grannon 47' (o.g.)	Report	Noone 42'	Attendance: 102

7 March 2011 61	Bradford Park Avenue	4–2	Hucknall Town	Horsfall Stadium, Bradford
19:45	O'Brie 10' (pen.); James 19', 41', 88'	Report	Holmes 60' (pen.); Whitman 90'	Attendance: 106

3 March 2011 62	Skelmersdale United	0–2	Northwich Victoria	S & O College Stadium, Skelmersdale
19:45		Report	Evans 7'; Fowler 72'	Attendance: 122

15 February 2011 63	Stocksbridge Park Steels	0–5	Matlock Town	Look Local Stadium, Stocksbridge
19:45		Report	Joynes 16'; Hannah 33', 55', 61'; Yates 69'	Attendance: 87

=== Semi-finals ===
The four clubs to have made it through the Quarter-finals were entered into the Semi-finals draw.

4 April 2011 64	Ashton United	1–0	Matlock Town	Hurst Cross, Ashton-under-Lyne
19:45	Ian Bennett 73'			Attendance: 150

7 April 2011 65	Northwich Victoria	3–1	Bradford Park Avenue	Victoria Stadium, Wincham
19:45	Nathan Woolfe 22'; Wayne Riley 39'; Louis Barnes 50'		Henry McStay 31' (pen.)	Attendance: 149

=== Final ===
The two clubs to have made it through the Semi-finals play each other in the final to decide the winner of the Challenge Cup.

30 April 2011 66	Ashton United	1–0	Northwich Victoria	Wincham Park, Wincham, Northwich
15:00	Burns 84'			Attendance: 489

== President's Cup ==
2010–11 Northern Premier League President's Cup
Tournament details
- Country: England
- Teams: 45

Final positions
- Champions: Lancaster City
- Runners-up: Belper Town

Tournament statistics
- Matches played: 44
- Goals scored: 166 (3.77 per match)

The Northern Premier League President's Cup 2010–11 was the 29th season of the Northern Premier League President's Cup, the cup competition of the Northern Premier League. 45 clubs took part. The competition commenced on 21 September 2010. The tournament was won by Lancaster City who beat Belper Town (the defending champions) 3–1 in the final.

=== Calendar ===
Round	Matches played	Matches	Clubs
Preliminary round	21 September 2010	13	45 → 32
First round	25 October 2010	16	32 → 16
Second round	16 November 2010	8	16 → 8
Quarterfinals	19 January 2011	4	8 → 4
Semifinals	22 February 2011	2	4 → 2
Final	5 April 2011	1	2 → 1

=== Preliminary round ===
The ten clubs that played in the preliminary round of the Challenge Cup received a bye to the first round. Nine other Division One teams were not drawn to play in the preliminary round of either competition.

Tie no	Home team	Score	Away team	Attendance
1	Lancaster City	2–1	Chorley	166
2	Leek Town	0–2	Chester	273
3	Lincoln United	4–1	Grantham Town	58
4	Ossett Albion	0–2	Durham City	85
5	Quorn	2–1	Barwell	104
6	Radcliffe Borough	1–2; AET	Curzon Ashton	95
7	Rainworth Miners Welfare	0–3	Carlton Town	121

Tie no	Home team	Score	Away team	Attendance
8	Rushall Olympic	4–1	Romulus	81
9	Sheffield	3–5; AET	Garforth Town	99
10	Skelmersdale United	1–0	Leigh Genesis	122
11	Stamford	2–0	Spalding United	131
12	Wakefield	2–1	Brigg Town	68
13	Woodley Sports	4–1	Cammell Laird	60

=== First round ===
The thirteen clubs to have made it through the preliminary round were entered into the draw with the rest of the teams from the two Division One leagues.

Tie no	Home team	Score	Away team	Attendance
14	AFC Fylde	7–1	Warrington Town	106
15	Belper Town	2–1	Quorn	80
16	Chester	3–1	Witton Albion	1,209
17	Clitheroe	1–2	Bamber Bridge	306
18	Durham City	2–3	Harrogate Railway Athletic	58
19	Garforth Town	2–3	Goole AFC	61
20	Lancaster City	3–0	Prescot Cables	104
21	Loughborough Dynamo	0–4	Lincoln United	50
22	Mossley	0–2	Curzon Ashton	112

Tie no	Home team	Score	Away team	Attendance
23	Newcastle Town	5–0	Trafford	68
24	Rushall Olympic	3–5	Market Drayton Town	81
25	Skelmersdale United	4–3	Salford City	104
26	Shepshed Dynamo	0–1	Glapwell	81
27	Stamford	2–1; AET	Carlton Town	116
28	Sutton Coldfield Town	2–0	Kidsgrove Athletic	59
29	Woodley Sports	1–2	Wakefield	50

=== Second round ===
The sixteen clubs to have made it through the first round were entered into the second round draw.

Tie no	Home team	Score	Away team	Attendance
30	Bamber Bridge	1–3	AFC Fylde	108
31	Chester	3–0	Sutton Coldfield Town	511
32	Curzon Ashton	5–0	Goole AFC	75
33	Lancaster City	2–1	Skelmersdale United	102

Tie no	Home team	Score	Away team	Attendance
34	Lincoln United	0–6	Belper Town	28
35	Market Drayton Town	2–4	Newcastle Town	88
36	Stamford	1–2	Glapwell	88
37	Wakefield	1–3	Harrogate Railway Athletic	85

=== Quarter-finals ===
The eight clubs to have made it through the second round were entered into the Quarter-finals draw.

8 February 2011 38	AFC Fylde	0–3	Chester	Kellamergh Park, Warton
19:45		Report	Wilson 29'; Howard 40'; Ruffer 59'	Attendance: 281

25 January 2011 39	Belper Town	3–2	Harrogate Railway Athletic	Christchurch Meadow, Belper
19:45	Thomas 63', 85'; Froggatt 75' (pen.)	Report	Husband 2'; Durham 53'	Attendance: 82

17 February 2011 40	Lancaster City	3–0	Curzon Ashton	Giant Axe, Lancaster
19:45	Swarbrick 38', 47', 67'	Report		Attendance: 108

19 January 2011 41	Newcastle Town	1–0	Glapwell	Lyme Valley Stadium, Newcastle-under-Lyme
19:45	Budrys 45'; Budrys (red card) 64'	Report		Attendance: 61

=== Semi-finals ===
The four clubs to have made it through the Quarter-finals were entered into the Semi-finals draw.

8 March 2011 42	Belper Town	2–0	Newcastle Town	Christchurch Meadow, Belper
19:45	Plant 14'; Froggatt 45'	Report		Attendance: 97

22 February 2011 43	Lancaster City	2–1 (a.e.t.)	Chester	Giant Axe, Lancaster
19:45	Swarbrick 20' (pen.); Johnson 108'	Report	Taylor (red card) 16'; Beck 58'	Attendance: 314

=== Final ===
The two clubs to have made it through the Semi-finals play each other in the final to decide the winner of the President's Cup.

5 April 2011 44	Belper Town	1–3	Lancaster City	Wincham Park, Wincham
19:45	Jon Froggatt 88' (pen.)	Report	Dave Swarbrick 33', 56', 74'	Attendance: 218

== Peter Swales Shield ==
2011 Peter Swales Shield
FC Halifax Town	Ashton United
1	1
- FC Halifax Town won 5–4 on penalties
- Date: 6 August 2011
- Venue: Hurst Cross, Ashton Under Lyne
- Attendance: 204

The Peter Swales Shield has changed format several times, and this season it saw the champions of the Premier Division play against the winners of the Challenge Cup. It was won by FC Halifax Town 5–4 on penalties against Ashton United after a 1–1 draw.

6 August 2011	FC Halifax Town (2010–11 NPL Premier Division Winners)	1–1 (a.e.t.) (5–4 p)	Ashton United (2010–11 Challenge Cup Winners)	Hurst Cross, Ashton Under Lyne
15:00	Gray 27'	Match Updates; Halifax FC Report; NPL Report	Dawson 57'	Attendance: 204
	Penalties
	Holland (penalty scored); Dean (penalty scored); Toulson (penalty scored); Winter (penalty scored); Hardy (penalty scored)		Burns (penalty scored); Smith (penalty scored); Wright (penalty scored); Bathurst (penalty scored); Harrop (penalty missed)

== See also ==
- 2010–11 Isthmian League
- 2010–11 Southern League
