= 2007–08 Mansfield Town F.C. season =

Mansfield Town
2007–08 season
- Manager: Bill Dearden, Paul Holland
- Stadium: Field Mill
- Football League Two: 23rd (relegated)
- FA Cup: Fourth round
- League Cup: First round
- Football League Trophy: First round

During the 2007–08 English football season, Mansfield Town Football Club competed in Football League Two where they finished in 23rd position with 42 points and were relegated to the Conference Premier.

== Final league table ==
Pos	Team	Pld	W	D	L	GF	GA	GD	Pts	Promotion or relegation
20	Dagenham & Redbridge	46	13	10	23	49	70	−21	49	
21	Notts County	46	10	18	18	37	53	−16	48	
22	Chester City	46	12	11	23	51	68	−17	47	
23	Mansfield Town (R)	46	11	9	26	48	68	−20	42	Relegation to 2008–09 Conference National
24	Wrexham (R)	46	10	10	26	38	70	−32	40	Relegation to 2008–09 Conference National

Updated to match(es) played on 3 May 2008. Source: The Football League
Rules for classification: 1) points; 2) goal difference; 3) number of goals scored.
(R) Relegated

== Results ==
Mansfield Town's score comes first

=== Legend ===
Win	Draw	Loss

=== Football League Two ===
Match	Date	Opponent	Venue	Result	Attendance	Scorers
1	11 August 2007	Brentford	A	1–1	4,909	Boulding
2	18 August 2007	Lincoln City	H	1–3	3,357	Boulding
3	25 August 2007	Morecambe	A	1–3	2,980	Boulding
4	1 September 2007	Stockport County	H	4–2	2,747	Boulding, McAliskey, Buxton, McIntosh
5	9 September 2007	Peterborough United	A	1–2	4,721	McAliskey
6	15 September 2007	Chesterfield	H	1–3	4,514	Dawson
7	22 September 2007	Accrington Stanley	A	0–1	1,408	
8	29 September 2007	Dagenham & Redbridge	H	0–1	2,048	
9	2 October 2007	Milton Keynes Dons	H	1–2	1,984	Boulding
10	6 October 2007	Rotherham United	A	2–3	3,881	Boulding, Arnold
11	13 October 2007	Barnet	A	1–1	2,041	Brown
12	20 October 2007	Notts County	H	2–0	4,002	Boulding (2)
13	27 October 2007	Shrewsbury Town	A	0–0	5,347	
14	3 November 2007	Macclesfield Town	H	5–0	2,853	Boulding, Arnold, Brown (3)
15	6 November 2007	Hereford United	A	1–2	2,272	Boulding
16	24 November 2007	Rochdale	A	0–1	2,431	
17	5 December 2007	Bradford City	H	0–0	2,308	
18	15 December 2007	Grimsby Town	A	0–1	3,836	
19	22 December 2007	Chesterfield	A	0–2	6,300	
20	26 December 2007	Peterborough United	H	2–0	3,107	Boulding (2)
21	29 December 2007	Accrington Stanley	H	1–2	2,494	Holmes
22	1 January 2008	Milton Keynes Dons	A	0–1	9,583	
23	8 January 2008	Wycombe Wanderers	H	0–4	1,959	
24	12 January 2008	Chester City	H	1–0	2,092	Hamshaw
25	19 January 2008	Darlington	H	0–1	3,344	
26	29 January 2008	Lincoln City	A	2–1	4,280	Boulding (2)
27	2 February 2008	Brentford	H	2–3	2,511	Boulding, Louis
28	9 February 2008	Wycombe Wanderers	A	2–1	5,963	Boulding, Louis
29	12 February 2008	Morecambe	H	1–2	2,287	Bell
30	16 February 2008	Darlington	A	2–1	3,527	Louis, Dawson
31	23 February 2008	Chester City	H	1–3	2,362	Mullins
32	26 February 2008	Bury	H	1–1	1,923	Buxton
33	1 March 2008	Wrexham	A	1–1	4,865	Boulding
34	8 March 2008	Rochdale	H	0–4	2,351	
35	11 March 2008	Hereford United	H	0–1	1,606	
36	15 March 2008	Bradford City	A	2–1	13,661	Boulding, Arnold
37	22 March 2008	Grimsby Town	H	1–2	2,616	Arnold
38	24 March 2008	Bury	A	0–2	2,779	
39	29 March 2008	Notts County	A	0–0	10,027	
40	1 April 2008	Wrexham	H	2–1	3,435	Louis, Mullins
41	5 April 2008	Barnet	H	2–2	2,463	Boulding, Hamshaw
42	9 April 2008	Stockport County	A	1–2	4,982	Dicker (o.g.)
43	12 April 2008	Macclesfield Town	A	0–0	3,250	
44	19 April 2008	Shrewsbury Town	H	3–1	3,334	Boulding (3)
45	26 April 2008	Rotherham United	H	0–1	5,271	
46	3 May 2008	Dagenham & Redbridge	A	0–2	3,451	

=== FA Cup ===
Round	Date	Opponent	Venue	Result	Attendance	Scorers
R1	10 November 2007	Lewes	H	3–0	2,607	M Boulding, R Boulding, Holmes
R2	2 December 2007	Harrogate Railway Athletic	A	3–2	1,486	Boulding (2), Jelleyman
R3	5 January 2008	Brighton & Hove Albion	A	2–1	5,857	Holmes, Hamshaw
R4	26 January 2008	Middlesbrough	H	0–2	6,258	

=== League Cup ===
Round	Date	Opponent	Venue	Result	Attendance	Scorers
R1	14 August 2007	Oldham Athletic	A	1–4	3,155	Mullins

=== Football League Trophy ===
Round	Date	Opponent	Venue	Result	Attendance	Scorers
R1	4 September 2007	Rotherham United	H	0–1	1,578	

== Squad statistics ==
No.	Pos.	Name	League		FA Cup		League Cup		League Trophy		Total	
No.	Pos.	Name	Apps	Goals	Apps	Goals	Apps	Goals	Apps	Goals	Apps	Goals
1	GK	(England) Jason White	10(3)	0	0	0	0	0	0	0	10(3)	0
2	DF	(England) Johnny Mullins	42(1)	2	4	0	1	1	1	0	48(1)	3
3	DF	(Wales) Gareth Jelleyman	37(2)	0	4	1	1	0	1	0	43(2)	1
4	DF	(England) Jonathan D'Laryea	23(6)	0	3(1)	0	0	0	0	0	26(7)	0
5	DF	(Scotland) Martin McIntosh	9(2)	1	0	0	1	0	0	0	10(2)	1
6	DF	(England) Lee Bell	23(1)	1	3(1)	0	1	0	0	0	27(2)	1
7	MF	(England) Matthew Hamshaw	45	2	4	1	0	0	1	0	50	3
8	DF	(Republic of Ireland) Stephen Dawson	43	2	4	0	1	0	1	0	49	2
9	FW	(England) John McAliskey	9(7)	2	0(2)	0	1	0	1	0	11(9)	2
10	FW	(England) Simon Brown	15(14)	4	2(1)	0	0	0	0	0	17(15)	4
11	FW	(England) Michael Boulding	43	22	3	3	1	0	0	0	47	25
12	DF	(England) Jake Buxton	40	2	4	0	1	0	1	0	46	2
13	DF	(England) Alex Baptiste	25	0	1	0	0	0	0	0	26	0
14	DF	(England) Dan Martin	21(5)	0	4	0	1	0	0(1)	0	26(5)	0
15	MF	(England) Lee Bullock	5	0	0	0	0	0	0	0	5	0
15	MF	(England) Ryan Goward	0(2)	0	0	0	0	0	0	0	0(2)	0
16	FW	(England) Nathan Arnold	21(11)	4	1(1)	0	1	0	1	0	24(12)	4
17	GK	(England) Ashley Kitchen	1	0	0	0	0	0	0	0	1	0
18	MF	(England) Ian Holmes	4(12)	1	1(1)	2	0	0	1	0	6(13)	3
19	GK	(England) Carl Muggleton	36	0	4	0	1	0	1	0	42	0
20	FW	(Dominica) Jefferson Louis	14(4)	4	0	0	0	0	0	0	14(4)	4
22	MF	(England) Will Atkinson	10(2)	0	0	0	0	0	0	0	10(2)	0
22	MF	(England) Sean McAllister	5(2)	0	0	0	0	0	0	0	5(2)	0
23	MF	(England) Danny Sleath	2(5)	0	0(1)	0	0(1)	0	1	0	3(7)	0
24	DF	(England) Chris Wood	8(5)	0	0	0	0	0	1	0	9(5)	0
25	DF	(England) Neil Wainwright	1(4)	0	0	0	0	0	0	0	1(4)	0
26	MF	(England) Kevin Horlock	0(5)	0	0	0	0	0	0	0	0(5)	0
27	MF	(England) Keith Briggs	10(3)	0	0	0	0	0	0	0	10(3)	0
30	FW	(England) Rory Boulding	4(7)	0	2(1)	1	0(1)	0	0(1)	0	6(10)	1
31	MF	(England) Warren Burrell	0(1)	0	0	0	0	0	0	0	0(1)	0
31	FW	(England) Danny Reet	0(2)	0	0	0	0	0	0(1)	0	0(3)	0
32	MF	(England) Lewis Trimmer	0(2)	0	0	0	0	0	0	0	0(2)	0
–	–	Own goals	–	1	–	0	–	0	–	0	–	1
