= Lewis Trimmer =

English footballer

Personal information
- Full name: Lewis James Montgomery Trimmer
- Date of birth: 30 October 1989 (age 36)
- Place of birth: Norwich, England
- Height: 5 ft 9 in (1.75 m)
- Position: Striker

Senior career*
Years	Team	Apps	(Gls)
2006–2009	Mansfield Town	3	(0)
2009	→ Glapwell (loan)		
2009	Belper Town		
2009–?	Rainworth Miners Welfare		
2010–?	Carlton Town		
2011	Cambridge City		
2011	→ Newmarket Town (loan)	2	(0)
2011–2012	Cambridge University Press	11	(4)
- * Club domestic league appearances and goals as of 23:14, 4 May 2008 (UTC)

Lewis Trimmer (born 30 October 1989 in Norwich) is an English former professional footballer.

== Career ==
Trimmer began his footballing career as a trainee with Mansfield Town in August 2006. He made his debut as a 79th-minute substitute in the Football League Two match against Bury in May 2007, and made a second appearance against Wycombe Wanderers in January 2008. By the end of the 2007–08 season, he had made three substitute appearances for Mansfield Town. After Mansfield Town were relegated to the Football Conference at the end of the 2007–08 season, he was out of contract but signed a new one-year contract.

He spent some time on loan at Glapwell that season but his contract was not renewed by Mansfield, again, one season later.

In August 2009 he signed for Belper Town but departed from the club in October. He subsequently joined Rainworth Miners Welfare.

In June 2010 he joined Carlton Town.

He joined Cambridge City in August 2011 on non-contract terms after appearing in pre-season games and went out on loan to Newmarket Town appearing twice on loan

In November 2011 he joined Cambridge University Press.
