= 2011–12 Northern Premier League =

The 2011–12 season was the 44th season of the Northern Premier League Premier Division, and the fifth season of the Northern Premier League Division One North and South.

The League sponsors for 2011–12 were Evo-Stik. The league allocations were released on 20 May 2011.

== Premier Division ==
Northern Premier League Premier Division
- Season: 2011–12
- Champions: Chester
- Promoted: Bradford Park Avenue; Chester
- Relegated: Burscough; Chasetown; Mickleover Sports; Northwich Victoria
- Matches: 462
- Goals: 1,411 (3.05 per match)
- Top goalscorer: Steve Foster (21)
- Biggest home win: Stocksbridge Park Steels 7–0 North Ferriby United (28 January 2012)
- Biggest away win: Mickleover Sports 0–6 Kendal Town (3 September 2011)
- Highest scoring: 9 goals: F.C. United of Manchester 6–3 North Ferriby United (17 August 2011); Hednesford Town 5–4 Stafford Rangers (29 August 2011); Mickleover Sports 3–6 Frickley Athletic (28 September 2011); North Ferriby United 6–3 Ashton United (11 October 2011); Worksop Town 5–4 Mickleover Sports (30 November 2011); Whitby Town 4–5 Nantwich Town (3 December 2011)
- Highest attendance: 5,009; Chester 1–1 Northwich Victoria (9 April 2012)
- Lowest attendance: 101; Ashton United 0–1 North Ferriby United (7 March 2011)

The Premier Division featured five new teams:

- Chester, promoted as champions from NPL Division One North
- Chorley, promoted via play-offs from NPL Division One North
- Hednesford Town, transferred from Southern League Premier Division
- Rushall Olympic, promoted via play-offs from NPL Division One South
- Stafford Rangers, relegated from Conference North

=== League table ===
Pos	Team	Pld	W	D	L	GF	GA	GD	Pts	Promotion or relegation
1	Chester (C, P)	42	31	7	4	102	29	+73	100	Promotion to Conference North
2	Northwich Victoria (R)	42	26	8	8	73	43	+30	83 (Note: Northwich Victoria and Mickleover Sports deducted three points for fielding an ineligible player.)	Relegation to NPL Division One South (Note: Northwich Victoria were expelled from the Northern Premier League after being found guilty of failing to comply with League Rules relating to financial matters; on appeal this was reduced to relegation from the Premier Division.)
3	Chorley	42	24	7	11	76	48	+28	79	Qualification for Playoffs
4	Bradford Park Avenue (P)	42	24	6	12	77	49	+28	78	Qualification for Playoffs
5	Hednesford Town	42	21	10	11	67	49	+18	73	Qualification for Playoffs
6	F.C. United of Manchester	42	21	9	12	83	51	+32	72	Qualification for Playoffs
7	Marine	42	19	9	14	56	50	+6	66	
8	Rushall Olympic	42	17	10	15	52	51	+1	61	
9	North Ferriby United	42	16	10	16	56	70	−14	58	
10	Nantwich Town	42	15	13	14	65	61	+4	57 (Note: Nantwich Town and Whitby Town were deducted one point for fielding an ineligible player.)	
11	Kendal Town	42	15	8	19	78	83	−5	53	
12	Ashton United	42	15	8	19	61	67	−6	53	
13	Buxton	42	15	8	19	64	77	−13	53	
14	Matlock Town	42	12	14	16	52	54	−2	50	
15	Worksop Town	42	13	10	19	56	76	−20	49	
16	Stafford Rangers	42	12	12	18	60	65	−5	48	
17	Whitby Town	42	12	11	19	57	80	−23	46	
18	Stocksbridge Park Steels	42	10	12	20	57	75	−18	42	
19	Frickley Athletic	42	10	12	20	48	69	−21	42	
20	Chasetown (R)	42	10	11	21	50	75	−25	41	Relegation to NPL Division One South
21	Mickleover Sports (R)	42	11	10	21	67	85	−18	40	Relegation to NPL Division One South
22	Burscough (R)	42	5	11	26	54	104	−50	26	Relegation to NPL Division One North

Updated to match(es) played on 21 April 2012. Source:
Rules for classification: 1) points; 2) goal difference; 3) number of goals scored.
(C) Champions; (P) Promoted; (R) Relegated

=== Play-offs ===
Semifinals
3	Chorley	0
6	F.C. United of Manchester	2
4	Bradford Park Avenue	5
5	Hednesford Town	0

Final
6	F.C. United of Manchester	0
4	Bradford Park Avenue	1^{*}

^{*}AET

==== Semi-finals ====
28 April 2012
15:00

Chorley	0–2	F.C. United of Manchester
	Report	63' (Norton); 79' (Mulholland)

Victory Park, Chorley
Attendance: 2,754

28 April 2012
15:00

Bradford Park Avenue	5–0	Hednesford Town
	Report

Horsfall Stadium, Bradford
Attendance: 609

=== Final ===
6 May 2012
14:00

Bradford Park Avenue	1–0	F.C. United of Manchester
119' (Tom Greaves)	Report 1 Report 2

Horsfall Stadium, Bradford
Attendance: 1,897

=== Results grid ===
Home \ Away	ASH	BPA	BUR	BUX	CHA	CHR	CHO	FCU	FRK	HED	KEN	MAR	MAT	MIC	NAN	NFU	NOR	RSO	STA	STO	WTB	WKS
Ashton United		0–1	3–2	4–2	4–0	0–2	3–1	1–0	2–0	1–2	1–0	1–2	3–0	0–3	1–1	0–1	0–3	3–1	1–5	1–2	1–2	4–2
Bradford Park Avenue	4–0		3–0	3–1	2–1	2–1	1–0	2–5	3–0	0–1	4–1	0–1	2–2	3–1	3–1	1–0	1–2	0–2	3–1	2–0	3–0	1–0
Burscough	2–3	1–1		1–2	4–4	1–4	1–4	3–5	1–3	0–4	2–2	0–4	1–2	1–3	2–1	1–2	1–3	2–4	2–3	1–1	0–1	0–2
Buxton	2–1	1–3	2–2		0–0	1–1	1–3	0–4	3–0	1–3	5–3	0–4	2–1	2–0	4–3	1–3	2–3	1–2	3–1	1–4	0–1	1–3
Chasetown	1–0	0–4	4–1	1–3		1–1	1–1	0–3	2–1	1–2	2–1	0–1	1–1	0–1	4–4	2–2	0–1	0–2	0–1	1–3	1–1	1–2
Chester	1–0	3–2	4–0	4–0	1–0		3–0	2–1	2–2	1–2	4–0	4–0	4–0	2–1	1–1	6–0	1–1	1–1	2–0	5–1	2–0	2–0
Chorley	2–2	3–1	2–1	1–0	3–2	0–2		2–0	6–0	5–1	2–3	1–2	1–0	1–0	1–0	2–0	0–0	1–0	2–2	0–0	2–2	4–1
F.C. United of Manchester	2–1	5–2	1–1	1–2	1–2	2–3	0–0		2–2	2–0	1–0	1–1	2–1	4–0	1–3	6–3	4–1	0–0	1–2	3–0	3–0	3–1
Frickley Athletic	0–1	1–2	2–0	1–1	0–1	1–3	2–1	1–3		1–1	2–1	0–1	0–2	1–2	1–2	1–0	0–0	0–0	4–3	2–0	1–2	2–1
Hednesford Town	0–0	1–1	4–0	3–2	0–1	1–0	2–0	1–2	1–0		2–3	1–1	1–1	6–1	0–0	0–0	0–2	4–1	5–4	1–1	3–1	0–0
Kendal Town	1–3	1–1	3–4	0–0	1–4	0–3	1–2	3–1	1–1	2–1		3–3	2–1	3–3	4–1	2–3	4–1	1–3	0–1	4–2	2–1	3–0
Marine	1–0	0–2	0–0	1–0	2–3	1–2	2–4	1–2	2–1	1–0	1–1		2–2	2–3	0–0	0–2	0–2	0–3	0–1	1–0	1–2	4–0
Matlock Town	0–2	0–1	3–1	1–1	2–2	0–1	4–0	2–1	3–0	1–2	1–0	1–1		2–1	1–0	3–0	0–2	1–0	1–1	4–0	2–4	1–1
Mickleover Sports	1–1	4–0	1–1	1–3	2–3	1–3	3–4	0–2	3–6	1–2	0–6	0–1	3–1		3–1	4–0	0–2	2–2	1–0	1–3	5–0	1–1
Nantwich Town	1–1	0–3	3–4	0–0	0–0	4–1	1–0	1–1	0–0	2–2	3–0	1–2	2–1	1–1		2–1	3–2	4–1	2–0	1–0	2–0	0–1
North Ferriby United	6–3	2–1	0–0	1–4	1–1	0–3	1–2	0–0	1–2	1–2	4–2	2–0	1–1	3–1	3–1		2–3	1–0	3–1	2–1	1–0	0–0
Northwich Victoria	3–1	1–0	2–1	1–1	3–1	1–1	1–3	2–1	2–2	1–2	2–0	1–2	0–0	3–1	2–1	2–0		2–0	0–1	2–0	2–0	2–1
Rushall Olympic	1–0	0–0	3–0	3–1	1–0	0–4	1–0	1–0	1–2	2–1	2–3	0–1	1–0	1–1	0–1	1–1	0–3		2–1	3–0	3–2	0–0
Stafford Rangers	1–2	3–1	1–1	0–2	4–1	0–3	0–1	0–2	2–0	0–1	1–2	2–1	1–1	1–1	1–1	1–1	1–1	1–1		5–1	3–3	2–2
Stocksbridge Park Steels	1–1	2–2	0–2	0–1	2–0	1–2	0–3	2–2	1–1	4–0	1–3	1–1	1–1	1–1	1–5	7–0	3–4	2–0	1–0		0–2	3–0
Whitby Town	2–2	1–4	3–3	3–4	2–0	0–4	0–1	0–0	1–1	0–2	1–1	1–2	1–1	1–1	4–5	0–2	2–1	2–1	2–1	3–3		3–4
Worksop Town	3–3	0–2	2–3	2–1	4–1	0–3	1–5	2–3	2–1	1–0	3–5	0–3	2–0	5–4	3–0	0–0	0–1	2–1	1–1	1–1	0–1	

Updated to match(es) played on 21 April 2012. Source: NPL Premier Division results grid
Legend: Blue = home team win; Yellow = draw; Red = away team win.

=== Stadia and locations ===
Locations of the 2011–12 Northern Premier League Premier Division teams

Team	Stadium	Capacity
F.C. United of Manchester	Gigg Lane (Bury ground share)	11,840
Hednesford Town	Keys Park	6,500
Chester	Deva Stadium	5,376
Buxton	The Silverlands	5,200
Northwich Victoria	Victoria Stadium	5,098
Bradford Park Avenue	Horsfall Stadium	5,000
Ashton United	Hurst Cross	4,500
Chorley	The Chorley Group Victory Park Stadium	4,100
Nantwich Town	The Weaver Stadium	3,500
Stocksbridge Park Steels	Look Local Stadium	3,500
Whitby Town	Turnbull Ground	3,500
Worksop Town	Sandy Lane	3,200
Burscough	Victoria Park	3,054
Stafford Rangers	Marston Road	3,000
Marine	The Arriva Stadium	2,800
North Ferriby United	Grange Lane	2,700
Kendal Town	Lakeland Radio Stadium	2,400
Matlock Town	Causeway Lane	2,214
Frickley Athletic	Westfield Lane	2,087
Chasetown	The Scholars Ground	2,000
Mickleover Sports	Mickleover Sports Ground	1,500
Rushall Olympic	Dales Lane	1,400

== Division One North ==
Northern Premier League Division One North
- Season: 2011–12
- Champions: AFC Fylde
- Promoted: AFC Fylde; Witton Albion
- Relegated: Durham City; Woodley Sports
- Matches: 462
- Goals: 1,516 (3.28 per match)
- Top goalscorer: Shaun Tuck (31)
- Biggest home win: 7 goals: AFC Fylde 7–0 Harrogate Railway Athletic (14 January 2012); Bamber Bridge 7–0 Cammell Laird (28 January 2012)
- Biggest away win: Harrogate Railway Athletic 3–10 Radcliffe Borough (22 November 2011)
- Highest scoring: Harrogate Railway Athletic 3–10 Radcliffe Borough (22 November 2011)
- Highest attendance: 501 Lancaster City 4–2 AFC Fylde (29 August 2011)
- Lowest attendance: 31 Cammell Laird 1–3 Wakefield (10 March 2011)

Division One North featured two new teams:

- Farsley, promoted as champions from the Northern Counties East League Premier Division
- Ossett Town, relegated from the NPL Premier Division

=== League table ===
Pos	Team	Pld	W	D	L	GF	GA	GD	Pts	Promotion or relegation
1	AFC Fylde (C, P)	42	31	6	5	90	29	+61	99	Promotion to NPL Premier Division
2	Curzon Ashton	42	27	11	4	91	44	+47	92	Qualification for Playoffs
3	Witton Albion (P)	42	28	6	8	101	44	+57	90	Qualification for Playoffs
4	Farsley	42	25	6	11	86	48	+38	81	Qualification for Playoffs
5	Garforth Town	42	24	7	11	95	63	+32	79	Qualification for Playoffs
6	Lancaster City	42	24	5	13	80	48	+32	77	
7	Skelmersdale United	42	21	12	9	94	60	+34	75	
8	Woodley Sports (R)	42	22	5	15	71	51	+20	71	Relegation to NWCFL Premier Division. And changed name to Stockport Sports (Note: Woodley Sports relegated due to ground grading and security of tenure issues and changed name to Stockport Sports. Durham City resigned from the league on 21 April 2012.)
9	Durham City	42	20	2	20	81	80	+1	62	Resigned to Northern League Division One at the end of the season
10	Bamber Bridge	42	17	9	16	69	68	+1	60	
11	Warrington Town	42	17	9	16	69	71	−2	60	
12	Trafford	42	15	11	16	70	66	+4	56	
13	Salford City	42	14	10	18	69	73	−4	52	
14	Mossley	42	10	15	17	66	75	−9	45	
15	Radcliffe Borough	42	13	6	23	54	75	−21	45	
16	Prescot Cables	42	10	12	20	53	71	−18	42	
17	Ossett Town	42	11	9	22	41	84	−43	42	
18	Ossett Albion	42	11	6	25	59	95	−36	39	
19	Clitheroe	42	10	8	24	51	76	−25	38	
20	Wakefield	42	7	12	23	38	77	−39	33	
21	Harrogate Railway Athletic	42	8	7	27	54	115	−61	31	
22	Cammell Laird	42	8	4	30	34	103	−69	28	

Updated to match(es) played on 21 April 2012. Source:
Rules for classification: 1) points; 2) goal difference; 3) number of goals scored.
(C) Champions; (P) Promoted; (R) Relegated

=== Play-offs ===
Semifinals
2	Curzon Ashton	2(4)
5	Garforth Town	2(1)
3	Witton Albion	3
4	Farsley	0

Final
2	Curzon Ashton	0
3	Witton Albion	3

==== Semi-finals ====
23 April 2012
19:45

Curzon Ashton	2–2	Garforth Town

Tameside Stadium, Ashton-under-Lyne
Attendance: 406

Curzon Ashton win 4–1 on penalties

24 April 2012
19:45

Witton Albion	3–0	Farsley

Wincham Park, Northwich
Attendance: 574

==== Final ====
28 April 2012
15:00

Curzon Ashton	0–3	Witton Albion

Tameside Stadium, Ashton-under-Lyne
Attendance: 989

=== Results grid ===
Home \ Away	FYL	BAM	CAM	CLT	CZA	DUR	FAR	GAR	HRA	LNC	MOS	OSA	OST	PRC	RAD	SLC	SKU	TRA	WAK	WAR	WTN	WDL
AFC Fylde		2–0	4–0	2–0	2–1	3–0	2–2	3–0	7–0	1–0	2–2	3–0	5–0	1–1	3–0	1–0	2–5	2–1	3–0	0–0	3–1	2–0
Bamber Bridge	0–1		7–0	6–0	0–2	1–2	2–1	1–3	3–2	2–6	3–0	4–0	1–1	2–1	2–3	0–3	2–2	1–0	1–1	2–1	0–6	1–1
Cammell Laird	0–2	1–3		1–1	1–2	3–2	0–3	1–4	5–1	0–3	0–1	3–1	1–0	1–0	1–0	0–2	1–3	0–1	1–3	0–5	1–1	0–3
Clitheroe	2–6	1–3	5–1		0–4	1–2	2–1	3–2	3–1	2–1	1–1	2–2	1–2	1–2	4–0	1–1	1–2	1–4	0–1	2–0	0–1	1–2
Curzon Ashton	2–0	3–1	0–0	2–1		2–0	3–2	3–1	3–0	3–1	3–3	2–1	4–0	4–1	1–0	1–1	2–2	2–0	1–1	2–0	1–1	2–1
Durham City	1–2	3–0	4–1	1–0	1–3		1–0	4–5	4–1	5–3	4–2	1–1	3–2	1–3	2–1	2–4	0–3	3–4	0–1	7–1	1–3	3–0
Farsley	2–0	3–2	2–1	2–0	1–2	1–0		2–3	3–0	1–3	3–0	5–0	2–1	4–2	1–0	6–0	1–2	4–2	2–1	0–1	1–0	3–1
Garforth Town	1–2	3–1	6–0	2–1	1–2	2–1	1–1		5–1	1–2	0–1	2–3	5–1	3–0	1–2	3–2	2–1	2–1	1–0	6–0	4–3	4–1
Harrogate Railway Athletic	0–3	0–2	3–1	1–0	3–3	0–1	1–3	1–1		3–2	1–6	1–3	2–3	2–2	3–10	2–0	0–2	0–1	0–1	1–3	1–6	0–4
Lancaster City	1–1	0–1	1–0	0–2	1–1	1–2	4–1	1–2	3–2		2–0	2–0	4–1	3–0	1–0	1–0	3–1	5–1	2–0	5–1	1–2	2–1
Mossley	0–1	1–2	0–0	0–0	0–4	3–4	1–2	1–2	1–1	1–3		6–2	3–2	1–1	2–0	2–1	2–2	1–1	6–0	1–1	1–1	0–4
Ossett Albion	0–3	2–3	6–0	2–0	1–3	3–0	1–4	2–5	3–2	0–0	1–4		2–2	0–1	0–2	2–1	0–3	0–1	1–0	0–2	0–4	2–3
Ossett Town	0–0	1–0	3–0	2–0	1–1	0–1	0–2	0–2	0–0	2–1	2–1	1–1		0–4	1–1	0–2	0–6	2–0	4–0	1–0	0–1	0–4
Prescot Cables	0–2	2–2	3–1	4–1	0–1	0–1	0–2	1–1	5–2	0–1	2–3	2–1	0–0		1–1	1–1	2–1	0–1	1–1	0–1	1–3	0–1
Radcliffe Borough	1–2	1–2	2–1	1–0	1–3	3–2	3–3	2–3	2–2	0–1	2–2	3–2	1–0	1–0		0–3	2–2	0–1	0–2	0–1	0–3	0–3
Salford City	0–2	2–2	5–0	0–1	2–3	3–0	2–1	2–2	1–4	0–2	4–1	3–1	2–2	1–1	0–2		3–3	3–1	2–0	1–5	1–1	3–0
Skelmersdale United	1–3	1–2	3–1	2–2	2–2	6–3	1–1	0–0	2–0	1–1	3–1	1–2	4–0	4–1	4–1	2–1		1–0	3–1	4–1	1–3	2–2
Trafford	2–4	1–1	2–0	3–2	2–2	2–3	0–0	0–0	1–2	1–1	1–1	1–2	2–3	2–1	4–1	2–2	4–0		3–3	2–2	2–3	1–2
Wakefield	0–1	0–0	0–2	3–3	0–3	0–4	0–1	1–3	1–5	0–2	1–1	2–2	4–1	1–1	0–2	1–2	1–1	1–4		2–2	0–1	1–0
Warrington Town	0–1	3–1	2–1	1–1	0–2	0–0	2–5	4–0	0–1	4–0	1–1	3–2	2–0	5–1	3–1	4–2	1–2	3–3	2–2		0–2	1–0
Witton Albion	2–1	2–0	1–2	0–1	3–1	4–1	1–1	5–1	4–1	0–4	2–1	4–2	5–0	2–2	3–0	4–1	1–2	0–3	1–0	5–0		4–1
Woodley Sports	1–0	0–0	3–1	2–1	2–0	2–1	0–1	0–0	2–2	2–0	3–1	1–3	4–0	4–0	0–2	4–0	2–1	0–2	2–1	2–1	1–2	

Updated to match(es) played on 21 April 2012. Source: NPL Division North results grid
Legend: Blue = home team win; Yellow = draw; Red = away team win.

=== Stadia and locations ===
Locations of the 2011–12 Northern Premier League Division One North teams

Team	Stadium	Capacity
Witton Albion	Wincham Park	4,813
Curzon Ashton	Tameside Stadium	4,000
Mossley	Steel Park	4,000
Wakefield	College Grove	4,000
Farsley	Throstle Nest	3,900
Harrogate Railway Athletic	Station View	3,500
Lancaster City	Giant Axe	3,500
Radcliffe Borough	Stainton Park	3,500
Warrington Town	Cantilever Park	3,500
Prescot Cables	Valerie Park	3,200
Durham City	The Arnott Stadium	3,000
Garforth Town	Genix Healthcare Stadium	3,000
Ossett Albion	WareHouse Systems Stadium	3,000
Skelmersdale United	West Lancashire College Stadium	2,500
Trafford	Shawe View	2,500
Bamber Bridge	QED Stadium	2,264
Clitheroe	Shawbridge	2,000
Ossett Town	Ingfield	2,000
Woodley Sports	The Neil Rourke Memorial Stadium	2,000
AFC Fylde	Kellamergh Park	1,500
Cammell Laird	Kirklands Stadium	1,500
Salford City	Moor Lane	1,400

== Division One South ==
Northern Premier League Division One South
- Season: 2011–12
- Champions: Grantham Town
- Promoted: Grantham Town; Ilkeston
- Relegated: Quorn; Shepshed Dynamo
- Matches: 462
- Goals: 1,519 (3.29 per match)
- Top goalscorer: Jonathan Froggatt (27)
- Biggest home win: 6 goals: Carlton Town 7–1 Leek Town (21 January 2012); Sheffield 7–1 Shepshed Dynamo (20 March 2012); Sheffield 6–0 Stamford (27 March 2012)
- Biggest away win: Quorn 0–8 Carlton Town (28 January 2012)
- Highest scoring: Goole 5–4 Romulus (24 September 2011)
- Highest attendance: 1,315 Ilkeston 4–0 Goole (13 August 2011)
- Lowest attendance: 44 Brigg Town 5–2 Quorn (6 December 2011)

Division One South featured four new teams:

- Coalville Town, promoted as champions from the Midland Alliance
- Hucknall Town, relegated from the NPL Premier Division
- Ilkeston, new team
- New Mills, promoted as champions from the North West Counties League Premier Division

=== League table ===
Pos	Team	Pld	W	D	L	GF	GA	GD	Pts	Promotion or relegation
1	Grantham Town (C, P)	42	29	7	6	92	44	+48	93 (Note: Grantham Town deducted one point for fielding an ineligible player.)	Promotion to NPL Premier Division
2	Carlton Town	42	26	5	11	101	52	+49	83	Qualification for Playoffs
3	Ilkeston (P)	42	26	5	11	93	44	+49	83	Qualification for Playoffs
4	Sheffield	42	22	9	11	93	62	+31	75	Qualification for Playoffs
5	Leek Town	42	22	8	12	77	60	+17	74	Qualification for Playoffs
6	Belper Town	42	23	5	14	74	57	+17	74	
7	Stamford	42	20	8	14	77	75	+2	68	
8	Loughborough Dynamo	42	18	11	13	80	61	+19	65	
9	New Mills	42	17	12	13	79	76	+3	63	Transferred to the NPL Division One North
10	Goole	42	18	8	16	72	78	−6	62	Transferred to the NPL Division One North
11	Hucknall Town	42	16	9	17	54	61	−7	57	
12	Sutton Coldfield Town	42	16	7	19	72	63	+9	55	
13	Kidsgrove Athletic	42	13	16	13	62	59	+3	55	
14	Coalville Town	42	15	10	17	69	72	−3	55	
15	Newcastle Town	42	14	10	18	59	70	−11	52	
16	Market Drayton Town	41	11	14	16	61	84	−23	47	
17	Brigg Town	42	11	12	19	52	76	−24	45	
18	Lincoln United	42	10	13	19	65	85	−20	43	
19	Rainworth Miners Welfare	42	10	11	21	38	55	−17	41	
20	Romulus	42	7	15	20	56	85	−29	36	
21	Quorn (R)	42	6	9	27	48	85	−37	27	Relegation to UCL Premier Division
22	Shepshed Dynamo (R)	42	5	10	27	45	115	−70	25	Relegation to UCL Premier Division

Updated to match(es) played on 21 April 2012. Source:
Rules for classification: 1) points; 2) goal difference; 3) number of goals scored.
(C) Champions; (P) Promoted; (R) Relegated

=== Play-offs ===
Semifinals
2	Carlton Town	2(6)
5	Leek Town	2(7)
3	Ilkeston	7
4	Sheffield	0

Final
3	Ilkeston	2
5	Leek Town	0

==== Semi-finals ====
23 April 2012
19:45

Ilkeston	7–0	Sheffield

New Manor Ground, Ilkeston
Attendance: 1,068

25 April 2012
19:45

Carlton Town	2–2	Leek Town

Bill Stokeld Stadium, Carlton
Attendance: 369

Leek Town win 6–7 on penalties

==== Final ====
28 April 2012
15:00

Ilkeston	2–0	Leek Town
	Report

New Manor Ground, Ilkeston
Attendance: 1,670

=== Results grid ===
Home \ Away	BLP	BRG	CAR	COA	GOO	GRN	HUC	ILK	KID	LEE	LIN	LOU	MAR	NEW	NEM	QON	RAI	ROM	SHE	SPD	STM	SUT
Belper Town		2–2	0–2	0–2	2–0	0–3	1–5	3–1	3–1	2–1	1–0	3–1	3–2	3–1	1–1	2–1	1–0	2–1	1–3	3–1	2–3	1–2
Brigg Town	1–2		3–2	0–0	1–2	2–3	1–2	1–1	0–4	0–3	2–1	0–3	3–0	1–1	1–4	5–2	0–4	1–0	0–2	3–2	2–2	2–1
Carlton Town	3–2	2–0		4–2	3–0	2–1	3–1	2–0	2–2	7–1	1–2	2–1	5–2	2–3	1–1	2–1	0–0	4–0	3–1	1–0	4–2	0–2
Coalville Town	1–3	1–1	1–3		3–1	1–2	2–0	0–0	1–1	2–4	1–2	0–2	2–2	1–0	0–0	2–0	1–5	4–2	1–3	2–0	0–2	2–0
Goole	0–3	1–3	2–2	4–2		3–4	3–1	3–0	1–2	1–1	2–4	3–1	1–1	4–2	0–4	2–0	2–1	5–4	1–1	3–1	1–1	0–1
Grantham Town	2–0	1–1	4–2	0–0	3–0		1–1	2–1	3–0	1–3	3–3	1–0	4–2	2–3	2–0	1–0	0–1	4–0	2–0	2–0	1–0	2–1
Hucknall Town	0–3	0–1	3–2	2–2	0–1	1–1		0–2	1–0	0–0	3–0	0–3	0–1	1–0	1–0	0–1	1–0	2–0	2–3	2–2	0–2	3–1
Ilkeston	0–1	2–0	2–0	0–0	4–0	1–3	3–1		1–2	3–4	3–1	2–2	1–0	3–0	3–1	2–0	2–0	4–1	4–1	5–0	1–2	2–1
Kidsgrove Athletic	2–0	1–0	0–0	2–2	1–2	1–2	1–1	0–0		2–2	3–3	1–0	0–0	1–1	0–2	2–0	1–1	2–2	2–1	1–2	3–2	2–1
Leek Town	0–3	3–0	1–0	2–1	2–2	1–3	0–2	0–1	0–1		1–0	3–2	1–2	1–0	4–0	4–2	1–0	3–0	2–3	5–0	2–0	0–5
Lincoln United	1–1	1–1	1–4	3–2	3–4	1–1	0–1	2–5	1–1	1–2		1–1	1–4	0–2	1–2	0–0	0–0	1–1	2–2	2–3	4–5	3–1
Loughborough Dynamo	2–2	2–1	2–4	1–3	2–1	3–1	3–0	2–4	2–1	1–1	3–3		1–1	1–2	3–3	1–0	1–0	1–1	3–4	6–2	2–0	2–1
Market Drayton Town	3–0	1–1	1–0	0–2	1–3	1–5	3–0	0–6	2–1	1–1	2–3	1–7		0–2	1–4	1–1	1–1	2–1	2–4	4–1	2–2	0–3
Newcastle Town	2–0	2–1	0–2	1–5	4–4	0–0	2–4	0–2	2–2	2–3	3–0	1–5	2–1		1–1	1–0	1–1	1–1	2–1	0–1	1–2	0–1
New Mills	1–4	3–1	2–3	4–2	3–0	0–4	2–2	0–3	0–6	0–2	3–0	1–1	2–2	4–2		5–3	3–2	2–5	2–1	4–2	2–1	3–1
Quorn	1–2	1–3	0–8	2–3	1–2	0–5	0–0	3–2	3–3	0–1	1–3	1–3	0–0	2–3	2–2		3–2	1–1	1–2	5–0	1–2	1–0
Rainworth Miners Welfare	0–2	0–0	2–1	0–2	1–3	1–2	0–4	1–4	1–1	2–1	1–0	0–1	1–1	0–2	0–2	1–0		0–0	0–2	2–1	3–0	0–2
Romulus	2–1	1–1	1–3	4–1	0–2	2–3	0–1	0–4	4–1	2–2	1–3	2–0	1–2	1–0	2–1	3–3	1–1		1–1	2–2	0–0	1–1
Sheffield	0–2	1–0	2–1	2–3	4–0	2–0	1–0	1–3	3–0	4–2	2–3	0–0	4–2	1–1	2–2	0–0	2–0	4–1		7–1	6–0	3–2
Shepshed Dynamo	0–6	2–3	0–6	2–5	0–2	1–2	1–2	0–0	2–1	1–1	0–3	0–1	2–2	2–2	2–2	1–0	1–1	2–2	1–1		1–4	2–2
Stamford	1–1	2–2	0–1	4–2	1–0	1–3	1–1	2–4	3–2	1–4	4–0	2–1	0–1	3–2	1–1	3–2	2–1	4–1	4–3	3–0		3–2
Sutton Coldfield Town	2–0	6–1	1–2	2–0	1–1	2–2	5–1	2–1	0–2	1–2	2–2	2–2	1–4	0–2	1–0	0–3	0–1	3–1	3–3	4–1	3–0	

Updated to match(es) played on 21 April 2012. Source: NPL Division South results grid
Legend: Blue = home team win; Yellow = draw; Red = away team win.

=== Stadia and locations ===
Locations of the 2011–12 Northern Premier League Division One South teams

Team	Stadium	Capacity
Grantham Town	South Kesteven Sports Stadium	7,500
Hucknall Town	Watnall Road	5,000
Brigg Town	The Hawthorns	4,000
Newcastle Town	Lyme Valley Stadium	4,000
Leek Town	Harrison Park	3,600
Ilkeston	New Manor Ground	3,500
Goole	Victoria Pleasure Grounds	3,000
Shepshed Dynamo	The Dovecote	2,500
Belper Town	Christchurch Meadow	2,400
Lincoln United	Ashby Avenue	2,200
Coalville Town	Owen Street Sports Ground	2,000
Kidsgrove Athletic	The Seddon Stadium	2,000
Rainworth Miners Welfare	Welfare Ground	2,000
Romulus	The Central Ground (Sutton Coldfield Town ground share)	2,000
Sheffield	Coach and Horses Ground	2,000
Stamford	Vic Couzens Stadium	2,000
Sutton Coldfield Town	The Central Ground	2,000
Carlton Town	Bill Stokeld Stadium	1,500
Loughborough Dynamo	Nanpantan Sports Ground	1,500
New Mills	Church Lane	1,400
Quorn	Sutton Park	1,400
Market Drayton Town	Greenfields Sports Ground	1,000

== Challenge Cup ==
2011–12 Northern Premier League Challenge Cup
Tournament details
- Country: England
- Teams: 66

Final positions
- Champions: North Ferriby United
- Runners-up: Rushall Olympic

Tournament statistics
- Matches played: 65
- Goals scored: 250 (3.85 per match)

The 2011–12 Northern Premier League Challenge Cup (billed as the 2011–12 Doodson Sports Cup for sponsorship reasons) is the 42nd season of the Northern Premier League Challenge Cup, the cup competition of the Northern Premier League. The tournament was won by North Ferriby United who beat Rushall Olympic 4–1 after extra-time.

=== Calendar ===
Round	Matches played	Matches	Clubs
Preliminary round	5–20 September 2011	4	66 → 62
First round	26 September – 1 November 2011	20	62 → 42
Second round	18 October – 15 November 2011	10	42 → 32
Third round	2 November – 20 December 2011	16	32 → 16
Fourth round	9–11 January 2012	8	16 → 8
Quarterfinals	14–21 February 2012	4	8 → 4
Semifinals	20–21 March 2012	2	4 → 2
Final	28 April 2012	1	2 → 1

=== Preliminary round ===
In the preliminary round, eight teams from the lower regional divisions were drawn together.

Tie no	Home team	Score	Away team	Attendance
1	Ossett Town	0–2	Brigg Town	23
2	Rainworth Miners Welfare	1–2	Stamford	73
3	Romulus	3–5; AET	Kidsgrove Athletic	74
4	Warrington Town	4–2; AET	Cammell Laird	55

=== First round ===
The four clubs which made it through the preliminary round enter into the draw with the rest of the teams from the two Division One leagues which weren't drawn into the preliminary round.

Tie no	Home team	Score	Away team	Attendance
5	AFC Fylde	0–3	Bamber Bridge	121
6	Carlton Town	2–4; AET	Belper Town	71
7	Coalville Town	2–1	Ilkeston	213
8	Farsley	1–0	Durham City	91
9	Goole	5–0	Lincoln United	74
10	Harrogate Railway Athletic	1–5	Garforth	65
11	Kidsgrove Athletic	5–2	Market Drayton Town	108
12	Lancaster City	4–2	Skelmersdale United	123
13	Loughborough Dynamo	3–2	Hucknall Town	80
14	Mossley	2–0^{*}	Curzon Ashton	112

Tie no	Home team	Score	Away team	Attendance
15	New Mills	3–4	Salford City	105
16	Ossett Albion	1–2	Brigg Town	70
17	Prescot Cables	1–2	Warrington Town	101
18	Quorn	2–0; AET	Grantham Town	110
19	Radcliffe Borough	1–3	Woodley Sports	70
20	Sheffield	4–2	Wakefield	160
21	Shepshed Dynamo	0–3	Stamford	107
22	Sutton Coldfield Town	0–3	Newcastle Town	41
23	Trafford	1–1	Clitheroe	85
Clitheroe 4–2 on penalties
24	Witton Albion	4–0	Leek Town	133

- ^{*}Mossley were removed from the competition as they had not registered a player correctly.

=== Second round ===
The twenty clubs which made it through the first round were entered into the draw for the second round.

Tie no	Home team	Score	Away team	Attendance
25	Brigg Town	3–0	Farsley	54
26	Curzon Ashton	0–3	Woodley Sports	65
27	Goole	1–2	Garforth	74
28	Lancaster City	2–1	Clitheroe	102
29	Newcastle Town	2–0; AET	Warrington Town	69

Tie no	Home team	Score	Away team	Attendance
30	Quorn	1–2	Loughborough Dynamo	91
31	Salford City	2–1	Bamber Bridge	68
32	Sheffield	1–2	Belper Town	185
33	Stamford	5–3; AET	Coalville Town	101
34	Witton Albion	2–0	Kidsgrove Athletic	109

=== Third round ===
The ten clubs which made it through the second round were entered into the draw for the second round with the clubs from the Premier Division.

Tie no	Home team	Score	Away team	Attendance
35	Ashton United	1–4	Lancaster City	62
36	Belper Town	1–3; AET	Worksop Town	111
37	Brigg Town	0–1	Buxton	66
38	Burscough	0–2	F.C. United of Manchester	147
39	Woodley Sports	0–2	Kendal Town	53
40	Frickley Athletic	4–2	Garforth Town	98
41	Hednesford Town	3–1	Chester	251
42	Loughborough Dynamo	3–1; AET	Stamford	85

Tie no	Home team	Score	Away team	Attendance
43	Matlock Town	4–1	Mickleover Sports	191
44	Newcastle Town	2–2	Nantwich Town	108
Newcastle Town won 4–3 on penalties
45	North Ferriby United	1–0	Whitby Town	107
46	Northwich Victoria	4–0	Marine	163
47	Rushall Olympic	1–0	Chasetown	166
48	Salford City	1–2	Chorley	131
49	Stocksbridge Park Steels	1–1	Bradford Park Avenue	76
Bradford Park Avenue won 4–3 on penalties
50	Witton Albion	3–1	Stafford Rangers	96

=== Fourth round ===
The 16 clubs which made it through the third round were entered into the draw for the fourth round.

Tie no	Home team	Score	Away team	Attendance
51	Bradford Park Avenue	4–0	Loughborough Dynamo	91
52	Chorley	2–3	F.C. United of Manchester	830
53	Lancaster City	3–3; AET	Kendal Town	194
Kendal Town won 5–4 on penalties
54	Matlock Town	0–1	Frickley Athletic	169

Tie no	Home team	Score	Away team	Attendance
55	Newcastle Town	2–3	Northwich Victoria	109
56	North Ferriby United	4–2	Worksop Town	177
57	Rushall Olympic	2–1	Hednesford Town	209
58	Witton Albion	4–1	Buxton	128

=== Quarter-finals ===
The eight clubs to have made it through the fourth round were entered into the Quarter-finals draw.

14 February 2012 59	Frickley Athletic	3–1	F.C. United of Manchester	Westfield Lane, South Elmsall
19:45	Bleau 40'; Ludlam 45'; Walsh 72'	Report	Norton 7'	Attendance: 251

21 February 2012 60	Kendal Town	2–1	Witton Albion	Parkside, Kendal
19:45	Farrel 28'; Wooley 82' (og.)	Report	Titchiner 54'	Attendance: 123

15 February 2012 61	North Ferriby United	2–1	Bradford Park Avenue	Grange Lane, North Ferriby
19:45	Fry 32' (pen.), 79' (pen.)	Report	Marshall 12'	Attendance: 118

21 February 2012 62	Northwich Victoria	4–5	Rushall Olympic	The Seddon Stadium, Kidsgrove
19:45	Fitzpatrick 7'; Abbott 17'; Smythe 35'; Evans 85'	Report	Obeng 5', 45'; Melbourne 25'; Bannister 43'; Dacres 51'	Attendance: 102

=== Semi-finals ===
The four clubs to have made it through the Quarter-finals were entered into the Semi-finals draw.

20 March 2012 63	Rushall Olympic	2–1 (a.e.t.)	Frickley Athletic	Dales Lane, Rushall
19:45	Bannister 50'; Dacres 100'	Report	Grayson 4'	Attendance: 157

21 March 2012 64	North Ferriby United	3–0	Kendal Town	Grange Lane, North Ferriby
19:45	Bradshaw 62'; Clarke 68', 72'	Report		Attendance: 122

=== Final ===
The two clubs to have made it through the Semi-finals play each other in the final to decide the winner of the Challenge Cup.

28 April 2012 65	North Ferriby United	4–1 (a.e.t.)	Rushall Olympic	Coronation Park, Eastwood
15:00	Fry 76' (pen.); Taylor 92'; Anderson 97'; Bolder 108'	Report	Tolley 77' (pen.)	Attendance: 256

== President's Cup ==
2011–12 Northern Premier League President's Cup
Tournament details
- Country: England
- Teams: 44

At the 2011 league AGM, the 2011–12 Northern Premier League President's Cup, the cup competition of the Northern Premier League Division One North and South, was deferred for at least one year due to fixture congestion and clubs making losses from the games. It was decided to award the trophy to the team that tops the fair play league at the end of the season instead.

== Peter Swales Shield ==
2012 Peter Swales Shield
Chester	North Ferriby United
3	0
- Date: 4 August 2012
- Venue: Deva Stadium, Chester
- Referee: I Hussin
- Attendance: 591

The Peter Swales Shield has changed format several times, and the 2012–13 season saw the champions of the Premier Division, Chester, play against the winners of the Challenge Cup, North Ferriby United. Chester won the game 3–0.

4 August 2012	Chester (2011–12 NPL Premier Division Winners)	3–0	North Ferriby United (2011–12 Challenge Cup Winners)	Deva Stadium, Chester
15:00	Williams 56', 58', 90'	Report		Attendance: 591

== See also ==
- 2011–12 Isthmian League
- 2011–12 Southern League
