= Willis Francis =

English footballer

Personal information
- Full name: Willis David Francis
- Date of birth: 26 July 1985 (age 41)
- Place of birth: Nottingham, England
- Height: 5 ft 5 in (1.65 m)
- Position: Midfielder

Team information
- Current team: Basford United (manager)

Youth career
- 1999–2002: Notts County

Senior career*
Years	Team	Apps	(Gls)
2002–2004	Notts County	12	(0)
2004	→ Grantham Town (loan)	3	(0)
2004–2005	Grantham Town	61	(3)
2005–2007	Rugby Town	43	(3)
2007–2008	Glapwell		
2008	Rugby Town	12	(0)
2008–2009	Carlton Town		
2009	Hucknall Town		
2009–2010	Rainworth Miners Welfare		
2010–2012	Arnold Town		
2012–2015	Basford United		

Managerial career
- 2017–2018: Long Eaton United
- 2025–: Basford United
- * Club domestic league appearances and goals as of 18:48, 28 August 2011 (UTC)

Willis David Francis (born 26 July 1985) is an English former professional footballer who played as a midfielder in the Football League. He is currently manager of Basford United.

== Career ==
Francis came through the youth team of Notts County and made his debut for the club whilst he was a third year apprentice, in a 1–1 draw with Blackpool on 30 November 2002. In February 2004 he joined Grantham Town on work experience. He was released by County in March 2004 and rejoined Grantham for the remainder of the 2003–04 season, and was named Player of the Year in the following season for the club. In November 2005 he joined Southern League Premier Division side Rugby Town on a free transfer and made his debut in the same month away at Northwood. He missed part of the 2005–06 season due to a family illness. His first goal for the club came in the 2006–07 season against Aylesbury United in December. He left in September 2007 to join Northern Counties East League side Glapwell, but rejoined Rugby in January 2008 following Rod Brown's appointment. However, in March 2008 he was released from the club having failing to nail down a regular spot in the team.

After a spell as assistant manager at Basford United, in December 2017 Francis was appointed joint manager of Long Eaton United alongside Martin Clarke. They left the club the following year. In January 2025 Francis was appointed manager of Basford United, with John Ramshaw as his assistant.
