= Ashley Kitchen =

English footballer

Personal information
- Full name: Ashley James Kitchen
- Date of birth: 10 October 1988 (age 38)
- Place of birth: Mansfield, England
- Height: 5 ft 10 in (1.78 m)
- Positions: Defender; midfielder

Team information
- Current team: Rainworth Miners Welfare

Senior career*
Years	Team	Apps	(Gls)
2005–2009	Mansfield Town	4	(0)
2007–2008	→ Gainsborough Trinity (loan)	6	(0)
2009–2016	Glapwell		
- * Club domestic league appearances and goals

Ashley Kitchen (born 10 October 1988) is an English footballer who plays for Glapwell of the Northern Premier League. He previously played for Mansfield Town before being released in January 2009. Kitchen is a versatile player who can play in both midfield and defence.

== Career ==
Kitchen began his career as a trainee at Mansfield Town in August 2005 and made his first-team debut at right-back against Rochdale in April 2007. After featuring only twice for Mansfield in the 2007–08 season, Kitchen joined Gainsborough Trinity in December 2007 on a one-month loan. He left Mansfield by mutual consent in January 2009, and subsequently signed for Glapwell.

At the end of the 2010 season Kitchen moved to Carlton Town F.C.
