= Willie Gamble =

English former footballer who played a forward for Lincoln City

Personal information
- Full name: Simon William Gamble
- Date of birth: 5 March 1968 (age 58)
- Place of birth: Cottam, Nottinghamshire, England
- Height: 5 ft 9 in (1.75 m)
- Position: Forward

Youth career
- Lincoln City

Senior career*
Years	Team	Apps	(Gls)
1985–1989	Lincoln City	64	(15)
1988	→ Grantham Town (loan)	13	(9)
1989–1990	Boston United	21	(2)
–	Shepshed Albion		
–	Harworth Colliery Institute		
–	Brigg Town		
–	Armthorpe Welfare		
–	Glapwell		
–	Collingham (Notts)		
2002–20??	Retford United		
- * Club domestic league appearances and goals

Simon William Gamble (born 5 March 1968) is an English former footballer who scored 15 goals from 64 appearances in the Football League playing as a forward for Lincoln City. He also played non-league football for Grantham Town, Boston United, Shepshed Albion, Harworth Colliery Institute, Brigg Town, Armthorpe Welfare, Glapwell, Collingham (Notts) and Retford United. In 2020, he was assistant manager of Retford.
