= 2016 National League play-off final =

- The match programme cover
- Event: 2015–16 National League
Forest Green Rovers	Grimsby Town
1	3
- Date: 15 May 2016
- Venue: Wembley Stadium, London
- Referee: Robert Jones
- Attendance: 17,198

The 2016 National League play-off final, known as the 2016 Vanarama National League Promotion Final for sponsorship purposes, was an association football match between Forest Green Rovers and Grimsby Town on 15 May 2016 at Wembley Stadium in London. It was the 14th National League play-off final, the first under the name National League and the ninth to be played at Wembley. Grimsby won the match 3–1 to earn promotion into League Two, returning to the Football League after a six-year absence.

== Match ==
=== Details ===
15 May 2016
16:00 BST

Forest Green Rovers	1–3	Grimsby Town
Marsh-Brown 60'	Report	Bogle 42', 43'; Arnold 90+4'

Wembley Stadium, London
Attendance: 17,198
Referee: Robert Jones

Forest Green Rovers	Grimsby Town

GK	1	Steve Arnold
RB	6	Dale Bennett
CB	16	Aarran Racine	(c)
CB	4	Charlie Clough
LB	27	Ben Jefford	(substituted off) 71'
RM	9	Keanu Marsh-Brown
CM	24	Darren Carter	Booked
CM	2	David Pipe
LM	11	Elliott Frear
FW	17	Kurtis Guthrie	(substituted off) 77'
FW	26	Brett Williams	(substituted off) 45'
Substitutes:
GK	23	Jonny Maxted
DF	3	James Jennings	(substituted in) 71'
MF	7	Anthony Jeffrey	(substituted in) 77'
MF	12	Clovis Kamdjo
FW	20	Jon Parkin	(substituted in) 45'
Manager:
Scott Bartlett

GK	1	James McKeown
RB	2	Richard Tait
CB	22	Aristote Nsiala
CB	6	Josh Gowling
LB	3	Gregor Robertson
RM	20	Nathan Arnold	(substituted off) 90+6'
CM	8	Craig Disley
CM	16	Craig Clay
LM	31	Jon Nolan
FW	9	Omar Bogle	(substituted off) 89'
FW	10	Pádraig Amond	(substituted off) 80'
Substitutes:
DF	5	Shaun Pearson	(substituted in) 90+6'
DF	23	Danny East
MF	14	Marcus Marshall
FW	18	Jon-Paul Pittman	(substituted in) 80'
FW	35	Patrick Hoban	(substituted in) 89'
Manager:
Paul Hurst

=== Statistics ===
Statistic	Forest Green Rovers	Grimsby Town
Goals scored	1	3
Possession	35%	65%
Shots	12	14
Shots on target	4	10
Corner kicks	6	1
Fouls	18	8
Yellow cards	1	0
Red cards	0	0
