= Ryan Goward =

English footballer

Personal information
- Full name: Ryan Lee Goward
- Date of birth: 1 November 1989 (age 36)
- Place of birth: Mansfield, England
- Height: 5 ft 9 in (1.75 m)
- Position: Left-back

Youth career
- Mansfield Town

Senior career*
Years	Team	Apps	(Gls)
2007–2009	Mansfield Town	2	(0)
2009	→ Glapwell (loan)		
2009–2010	Glapwell		
2010–2012	Carlton Town	69	(4)
2012–2013	Rainworth Miners Welfare		
- * Club domestic league appearances and goals as of 23:20, 7 October 2015 (UTC)

Ryan Lee Goward (born 1 November 1989) is an English former footballer. He had spells with Mansfield Town, Glapwell, Carlton Town and Rainworth Miners Welfare.

== Career ==
=== Mansfield Town ===
Goward came through the youth scheme at Mansfield and made his debut appearance for Mansfield as a 55th-minute substitute against Barnet in October 2007. After Mansfield Town were relegated to the Football Conference at the end of the 2007–08 season, he signed a new one-year contract. Before his contract was not renewed one season later, Goward went out on loan to Glapwell in January 2009.

=== Later career ===
Since leaving Mansfield, Goward has had permanent transfers at Glapwell, Carlton Town and Rainworth Miners Welfare.
