= Nathan Arnold =

Former professional footballer turned manager

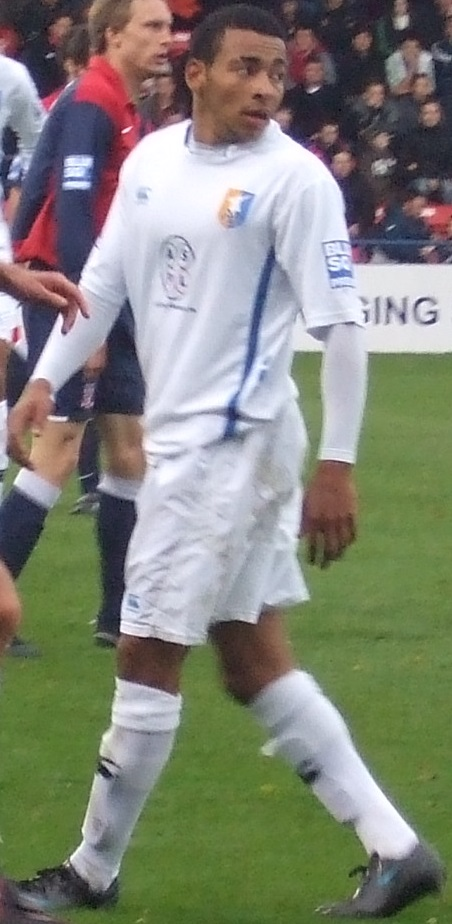
- Arnold playing for Mansfield Town in 2008

Personal information
- Full name: Nathan Anthony Arnold
- Date of birth: 26 July 1987 (age 39)
- Place of birth: Mansfield, England
- Positions: Attacking midfielder; winger; striker

Youth career
- ?–2005: Mansfield Town

Senior career*
| Years | Team | Apps | (Gls) |
| 2005–2009 | Mansfield Town | 104 | (13) |
| 2009–2010 | Hyde United | 35 | (9) |
| 2010–2013 | Alfreton Town | 109 | (23) |
| 2013–2015 | Cambridge United | 35 | (3) |
| 2014–2015 | → Grimsby Town (loan) | 35 | (6) |
| 2015–2016 | Grimsby Town | 40 | (8) |
| 2016–2018 | Lincoln City | 65 | (12) |
| 2018 | → Salford City (loan) | 3 | (0) |
| 2018 | Boston United | 8 | (3) |
| 2019 | Altrincham | 3 | (0) |
| 2020 | Bourne Town | 7 | (1) |
| Total | | 443 | (78) |

International career
| 2008 | England C | 1 | (0) |

Managerial career
- 2020–2021: Bourne Town
- 2021–2022: Newark Town
- 2022: Newark and Sherwood United
- 2022–2023: Cleethorpes Town
- 2023–2024: Sleaford Town
- 2024–2025: Grantham Town
- * Club domestic league appearances and goals

Nathan Anthony Arnold (born 26 July 1987) is an English football manager and former professional footballer. He was most recently manager of Grantham Town.

As a player he was active between 2005 and 2020 and was primarily a winger but could also play as a striker. He played for Lincolnshire sides Grimsby Town and Lincoln City; with The Mariners he scored the third goal in stoppage time to earn Grimsby promotion back to the Football League in a 3–1 victory over Forest Green Rovers at Wembley Stadium in the National League play-off final. The following season he also scored the only goal of the game for a Non-League Lincoln side in a 1–0 win over Ipswich Town in the FA Cup third round and would go on to be part of the Imps side that were eventually knocked out in the Quarter finals by Arsenal. He also played professionally for Mansfield Town and Cambridge United with spells at Non-League sides Hyde United, Alfreton Town, Salford City, Boston United and Altrincham.

== Playing career ==
=== Mansfield Town ===
Arnold came up through the youth team at Mansfield Town, and made his debut against Hereford United in October 2005. He scored his first career goal against Bristol Rovers in December 2005 in his third appearance for Mansfield. By the end of the 2006–07 season, he had made over 30 appearances for Mansfield, scoring four goals, and was offered a new contract in May 2007. By the end of the 2007–08 season, Arnold had made 70 appearances in all competitions for Mansfield.

=== Hyde ===
After a trial at Grimsby Town in July, he signed for Hyde United in the Conference North on a free transfer in August 2009, but with a sell-on clause in his contract stating that if he was sold in the future, Mansfield would gain some of the profits. His competitive debut for Hyde came with his first goal in a 1–0 win against Stafford Rangers, and then in the very next game he netted again in a 1–1 draw with Fleetwood Town. He also scored a 25-yard free kick against Salford City in the second qualifying round of the FA Cup.

At the end of his first season with Hyde he was one of the outstanding players in their team scoring 11 goals in 38 games in all competitions, making him Hyde's second-top scorer, two goals behind David McNiven.

=== Alfreton Town ===
Arnold spent only a single season at Hyde before returning to the East Midlands, signing-on for Conference North club Alfreton Town, helping them to win the league and achieve promotion to the Conference National in his first season. Arnold was one of the outstanding performers for the club, and immediately became a fans' favourite. He contributed 13 goals in all competitions over the course of the season.

The 2011–12 season started badly as Arnold missed a large proportion of the first half of the season after breaking his metatarsal which added to Alfreton Town's already lengthy injury list. After returning he scored at both ends in a bizarre game against Hayes & Yeading where there were four goals in injury time and the final score being 3–2. Arnold began to play an integral part in Alfreton Town's upturn in form from the halfway point in the season by contributing goals and assists, and was subsequently named runner-up for the supporters' player of the year for his part in sustaining the team's Conference National status. His contract came to an end at the end of the 2011–12 season and thus became a free agent, and was believed to be in discussions with his former club Mansfield Town despite Alfreton Town stating he had agreed to stay, creating confusion amongst the fans. On 5 June 2012, Alfreton Town announced that he had signed a new one-year contract with the club. He again contributed largely to the team's season by scoring nine goals and again contributing key assists helping them to achieve a comfortable midtable finish. In June 2013 Alfreton manager Nicky Law confirmed that Arnold was unlikely to remain with the club for the following season as he was keen to play League football again.

=== Cambridge United ===
He trialled at former club Mansfield Town but was not offered a contract and instead joined Cambridge United on a two-year deal. In the first half of the season he played a key part, mainly as an impact player from the bench, in the team's good form which seen them unbeaten for the first 16 games of the season, however the team's form soon dipped around Christmas and Arnold then found himself on the sidelines for periods until the end of the season. It was a compliment to the squad overall that the likes of Arnold and Delano Sam-Yorke amongst others found themselves on the sub's bench on many occasions. He did however play a key role in getting Cambridge United to the FA Trophy final by scoring the winner in the first round against Salisbury City and also against St. Albans City in the second round. He then made an appearance in every game of the cup run including a 20-minute appearance at Wembley Stadium for the final where Cambridge United beat Gosport Borough 4–0 to lift the trophy, and also contributed to them finishing the season in 2nd place and a play-off spot. At the end of the 2014–15 season the club did not offer him a new deal when his contract expired.

=== Grimsby Town ===
On 19 July 2014, Arnold joined Grimsby Town on a season long loan deal. Although he started his Grimsby Town career injured he went on to establish himself firmly as a first team starter and helped guide them to the play-offs, where he scored two wonderful goals in the 1–2 play off semi-final win over Eastleigh. The club narrowly missed out promotion by losing out in the 2015 Conference Premier play-off final at Wembley Stadium to Bristol Rovers on penalties, although Arnold set up Lenell John-Lewis's opening goal with a run from the half-way line and then went on to draw 1–1 after extra time. His efforts over the season earned him a place in the National League team of the year, alongside the league's outstanding players.

On 29 May 2015, he joined the club on a permanent one-year deal after being released by Cambridge United, citing the positivity around the club following their narrow avoidance of promotion, even despite reported interest from Football League teams. Over the course of the 2015/16 season Arnold once again played an integral part in taking Grimsby to the play-off and FA Trophy finals.

Arnold scored the third goal in Grimsby's 3–1 victory over Forest Green Rovers in the 2016 National League play-off final at Wembley, seeing Grimsby promoted to League Two after a six-year absence from the Football League.

At the end of the season, he was offered new terms, but after mulling over the contract, Arnold decided to seek a fresh challenge. "Several factors" were behind the decision.

=== Lincoln City ===
On 29 July 2016, Arnold signed for Lincoln City; he was signed using money raised from the club's crowd funding scheme. He made his debut for Lincoln in a 3–1 win over Woking.

On 17 January 2017, Arnold scored an injury time goal in a 1–0 FA Cup replay victory over Ipswich Town to enable Lincoln City to reach the Fourth Round of the FA Cup for the first time in 41 years. He was part of the team that not only won the National League that season, but also became the first non-league team for over 100 years to reach the quarterfinals of the FA Cup. On 10 February 2018, Arnold joined Salford City until the end of the season. Speaking to the Lincolnshire Echo after his arrival he made comments about the clubs ambitions not matching reality, saying the club was complacent and the professionalism wasn't what it was at Lincoln. The loan move was cancelled shortly afterwards.

=== Boston United ===
On 1 June 2018, Arnold left Lincoln City, following a mutual termination of his contract. The following day, he joined Boston United on a one-year contract, which also included a management role.

On 6 October 2018, Arnold left the club by mutual consent.

=== Altrincham ===
In June 2019, Arnold signed for Altrincham after six months away from football. He left the club on 21 August 2019.

== International career ==
On 27 August 2008, Arnold received an England C call-up by manager Paul Fairclough along with his Mansfield teammate Jonathan D'Laryea for the match against Bosnia-Herzegovina, which England lost 6–2.

== Managerial career ==
Arnold joined Bourne Town in August 2020, and was appointed joint player manager alongside Simon Dawes. The team only played nine games before the season was abandoned due to COVID-19 restrictions. He left the club in May 2021.

In June 2021, Newark Town appointed him as their First Team Manager.

Arnold resigned his position with Newark Town at the end of the 2021–22 season and was appointed manager of local rivals Newark and Sherwood United.

On 9 November 2022, Arnold was appointed manager of Cleethorpes Town. He left the club via mutual consent in March 2023.

On 1 November 2023, Arnold was appointed joint manager of Sleaford Town Football Club, working alongside Tom Ward. He left Sleaford in May the following year.

In December 2024, he was appointed manager of Grantham Town. Having been unable to win a match in charge, he resigned following relegation in April 2025.

== Personal life ==
Arnold has previously spoken about his struggles with anxiety following his mother's sudden death, even suffering an anxiety attack on the morning of Lincoln's title clinching 2–1 victory against Macclesfield Town in 2017.

"There were probably 20 games out of the 51 that I played last season when I was dealing with anxiety in my own way and just trying to battle through."

— Nathan Arnold, speaking to Lincolnshire Live in July 2017.

== Career statistics ==
=== Club ===
As of 19 August 2019

| Club | Season | League | | | FA Cup | | League Cup | | Other | | Total | |
| Club | Season | Division | Apps | Goals | Apps | Goals | Apps | Goals | Apps | Goals | Apps | Goals |
|---|---|---|---|---|---|---|---|---|---|---|---|---|
| Mansfield Town | 2005–06 | League Two | 8 | 1 | 1 | 0 | 0 | 0 | 1 (Note: Appearance in the Football League Trophy) | 0 | 10 | 1 |
| Mansfield Town | 2006–07 | League Two | 22 | 3 | 1 | 0 | 0 | 0 | 1 | 0 | 24 | 3 |
| Mansfield Town | 2007–08 | League Two | 32 | 4 | 2 | 0 | 1 | 0 | 1 | 0 | 36 | 4 |
| Mansfield Town | 2008–09 | Conference Premier | 42 | 5 | 1 | 1 | — | | 0 | 0 | 43 | 6 |
| Mansfield Town | Total | | 104 | 13 | 5 | 1 | 1 | 0 | 3 | 0 | 113 | 14 |
| Hyde United | 2009–10 | Conference North | 35 | 9 | 2 | 1 | — | | 1 (Note: Appearance in the Cheshire Senior Cup) | 1 | 38 | 11 |
| Alfreton Town | 2010–11 | Conference North | 36 | 8 | 2 | 0 | — | | 8 (Note: Six appearances and two goals in the FA Trophy, two appearances and three goals in the Derbyshire Senior Cup) | 5 | 46 | 13 |
| Alfreton Town | 2011–12 | Conference Premier | 28 | 6 | 1 | 0 | — | | 4 (Note: Three appearances and two goals in the FA Trophy, one appearance in the Derbyshire Senior Cup) | 2 | 33 | 8 |
| Alfreton Town | 2012–13 | Conference Premier | 45 | 9 | 3 | 1 | — | | 4 (Note: One appearance in the FA Trophy, three appearances and one goal in the Derbyshire Senior Cup) | 1 | 52 | 11 |
| Alfreton Town | Total | | 109 | 23 | 6 | 1 | — | | 16 | 8 | 131 | 32 |
| Cambridge United | 2013–14 | Conference Premier | 35 | 3 | 1 | 0 | — | | 8 | 2 | 44 | 5 |
| Grimsby Town (loan) | 2014–15 | Conference Premier | 34 | 6 | 1 | 0 | — | | 1 | 0 | 36 | 6 |
| Grimsby Town | 2015–16 | National League | 40 | 8 | 3 | 0 | — | | 4 (Note: One appearance in the FA Trophy, three appearances in Play-offs with One Goal) | 5 | 47 | 13 |
| Lincoln City | 2016–17 | National League | 45 | 12 | 7 | 1 | — | | 0 | 0 | 52 | 13 |
| Lincoln City | 2017–18 | League Two | 20 | 0 | 1 | 0 | 1 | 0 | 2 | 0 | 24 | 0 |
| Lincoln City | Total | | 65 | 12 | 8 | 1 | 1 | 0 | 2 | 0 | 76 | 13 |
| Salford City | 2017–18 | National League North | 3 | 0 | 0 | 0 | — | | 0 | 0 | 3 | 0 |
| Boston United | 2018–19 | National League North | 8 | 3 | 0 | 0 | — | | 0 | 0 | 8 | 3 |
| Altrincham | 2019–20 | National League North | 3 | 0 | 0 | 0 | — | | 0 | 0 | 3 | 0 |
| Career total | | | 436 | 77 | 26 | 4 | 2 | 0 | 35 | 16 | 499 | 97 |

== Honours ==
=== Club ===
Alfreton Town

- Conference North: 2010–11

Cambridge United

- Conference Premier play-offs: 2013–14
- FA Trophy: 2013–14

Grimsby Town

- National League play-off winners: 2015–16
- FA Trophy runner-up: 2015–16

Lincoln City

- National League: 2016–17

=== Individual ===
- Conference Premier Team of the Year: 2014–15
