= Ross Hannah =

English footballer (born 1986)

Personal information
- Full name: Ross Hannah
- Date of birth: 14 May 1986 (age 40)
- Place of birth: Sheffield, England
- Height: 5 ft 9 in (1.75 m)
- Position: Striker

Team information
- Current team: Rossington Main

Youth career
- Sheffield Wednesday
- Sheffield United

Senior career*
Years	Team	Apps	(Gls)
2003–2004	Worksop Town		
2004–2006	Stocksbridge Park Steels		
2006	→ Gainsborough Trinity (loan)		
2006	→ Belper Town (loan)		
2006–2007	Gainsborough Trinity	29	(7)
2007	Hednesford Town	0	(0)
2007–2008	Belper Town		
2008–2011	Matlock Town		
2011–2013	Bradford City	19	(2)
2012	→ FC Halifax Town (loan)	9	(7)
2012	→ Grimsby Town (loan)	14	(9)
2013–2015	Grimsby Town	69	(19)
2015–2016	Chester	42	(23)
2016–2017	Barrow	33	(5)
2017–2018	Chester	31	(8)
2018	→ Southport (loan)	9	(2)
2018–2020	Gainsborough Trinity	23	(5)
2020	→ Cleethorpes Town (loan)	4	(1)
2020	Cleethorpes Town	7	(1)
2020–2022	Matlock Town	27	(4)
2022–	Rossington Main	56	(47)

Managerial career
- 2019: Gainsborough Trinity (caretaker)
- 2019: Gainsborough Trinity
- * Club domestic league appearances and goals as of 20:41, 21 March 2024 (UTC)

Ross Hannah (born 14 May 1986) is an English professional footballer who plays as a striker for Rossington Main.

Hannah played youth football for Sheffield Wednesday and Sheffield United before spending the first eight years of his career playing semi-professionally. He turned professional in 2011 notably playing for Bradford City and Grimsby Town. He has also played at non-league level for Worksop Town, Stocksbridge Park Steels, Gainsborough Trinity, Hednesford Town, Belper Town, Matlock Town, Chester, Barrow, Southport and Cleethorpes Town. Whilst in his third stint with Gainsborough, Hannah spent a period as the clubs joint-manager along with Liam King, although the pair only remained in the job for seven months.

== Career ==
=== Early career ===
Hannah was born in Sheffield, South Yorkshire. After playing youth football with both Sheffield Wednesday and Sheffield United, Hannah spent his early senior career in non-League football, playing for Worksop Town, Stocksbridge Park Steels, Gainsborough Trinity, Belper Town, Hednesford Town, and Matlock Town.

=== Matlock Town ===
At Matlock, Hannah won the Northern Premier League Golden Boot award during the 2009–10 season, scoring 37 goals in all competitions. Hannah signed a new one-year contract with Matlock in May 2010. He won both the Evo-Stik League Golden Boot and the Non-League Golden Boot awards for the 2010–11 season, having scored 52 goals in all competitions, in a season which saw him beat Matlock's club goal-scoring record. Hannah won Matlock's Player of the Year award in all three seasons he spent with the club, and was also top scorer in all three seasons. Between 2009 and 2011, Hannah scored 90 goals for Matlock.

=== Bradford City ===
Hannah moved to Bradford City in May 2011, on a free transfer, two days before his 25th birthday. It was Hannah's first professional contract. Hannah made his debut for Bradford as an 84th-minute substitute for Chris Mitchell in a League Cup match against Leeds United. His first goal for the club came in the following match in a 1–1 draw against Oxford United. His third goal for Bradford came in a 3–1 win against AFC Wimbledon in the FA Cup, earning Bradford a place in the third round for the first time in seven years. He signed a one-year contract extension on 9 March 2012, exercising a clause in his original one-year contract, which was due to expire at the end of the season. Manager Phil Parkinson said that Hannah had "earned" the contract and that "there is more to come from Ross in the future". He joined Conference Premier club FC Halifax Town on loan in March 2012.

=== Grimsby Town ===
Hannah joined Conference Premier club Grimsby Town on 20 September 2012 on a three-month loan, and scored on his debut in a 4–1 victory against Luton Town. Hannah went on to score nine goals in 14 league appearances before his loan came to an end in December 2012. On 29 December 2012, Grimsby boss Rob Scott announced that Bradford were mulling over a bid from Grimsby to sign Hannah permanently. On 1 January 2013, Grimsby announced that a deal was close to being finalised but an injury crisis at Bradford had stalled the move with Hannah currently being used by Bradford. On 7 January 2013, Grimsby boss Rob Scott admitted that there was a sticking point on the financial side of the Ross Hannah deal, despite Grimsby and Bradford agreeing fees, as Hannah had stalled on personal terms. Hannah completed his move to Grimsby on 10 January 2013, signing a two-and-a-half-year contract for an undisclosed fee.

=== Later career ===
Following two seasons with Grimsby, Hannah signed for National League club Chester on a one-year contract.

He signed for Chester's National League rivals Barrow on 16 May 2016 on a two-year contract.

On 31 May 2017, Hannah re-signed for Chester on a two-year contract, turning down offers from Wrexham and Halifax in the process. He moved on loan to Southport in March 2018.

Hannah completed a move back to Gainsborough Trinity on 10 July 2018. In March 2019 he began working as caretaker manager, alongside Liam King. Their appointment was made permanent at the end of the season. He stepped down in October 2019 after Curtis Woodhouse became manager; Hannah remained at the club as a player.

On 4 February 2020, Hannah joined Cleethorpes Town on loan. He moved to the club on a permanent basis in July 2020.

On 28 November 2020, Hannah rejoined Matlock Town. He moved to Rossington Main in July 2022.

== Career statistics ==
As of match played 28 April 2018

Appearances and goals by club, season and competition
Club	Season	League			FA Cup		League Cup		Other		Total	
Club	Season	Division	Apps	Goals	Apps	Goals	Apps	Goals	Apps	Goals	Apps	Goals
Gainsborough Trinity	2006–07	Conference North	29	7	—		—		—		29	7
Bradford City	2011–12	League Two	18	2	3	1	1	0	4 (Note: Appearances in Football League Trophy)	0	26	3
Bradford City	2012–13	League Two	1	0	—		0	0	—		1	0
Bradford City	Total		19	2	3	1	1	0	4	0	27	3
FC Halifax Town (loan)	2011–12	Conference Premier	9	7	—		—		2 (Note: Appearances in Conference Premier play-offs)	0	11	7
Grimsby Town	2012–13	Conference Premier	28	10	—		—		8 (Note: Seven appearances in FA Trophy, one in Conference Premier play-offs)	0	36	10
Grimsby Town	2013–14	Conference Premier	33	13	5	2	—		3 (Note: One appearance in the FA Trophy, two in Conference Premier play-offs)	0	41	15
Grimsby Town	2014–15	Conference Premier	22	5	2	0	—		3 (Note: Two appearances in FA Trophy, one in Conference Premier play-offs)	0	27	5
Grimsby Town	Total		83	28	7	2	—		14	0	104	30
Chester	2015–16	National League	42	23	1	0	—		3 (Note: Appearances in FA Trophy)	3	46	25
Barrow	2016–17	National League	33	5	2	0	—		4	1	39	6
Chester	2017–18	National League	31	8	0	0	—		2	1	33	9
Southport (loan)	2017–18	National League North	9	2	—		—		—		9	2
Career total			266	81	13	3	1	0	29	5	298	89

== Honours ==
Grimsby Town

- FA Trophy runner-up: 2012–13
