= Ian Holmes (footballer, born 1985) =

English footballer

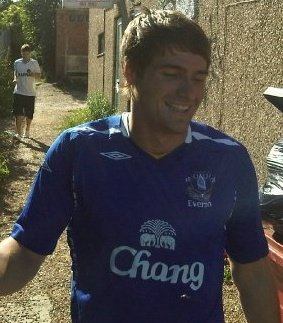

Personal information
- Full name: Ian David Holmes
- Date of birth: 27 June 1985 (age 41)
- Place of birth: Ellesmere Port, England
- Position: Striker

Senior career*
Years	Team	Apps	(Gls)
2003-2004	Vicar's Cross Dynamos	42	(75)
2006–2007	Matlock Town		(25)
2007–2008	Mansfield Town	16	(1)
2008	→ AFC Telford United (loan)	7	
2008–2009	Eastwood Town	40	(22)
2010–2011	Glapwell	52	(36)
2011–2012	Matlock Town	?	(14)
2023–2024	Great Missenden	6	(1)
- * Club domestic league appearances and goals as of 15:41, 30 March 2008 (UTC)

Ian David Holmes (born 27 June 1985) is a former footballer who played as a striker. He most notably played for Mansfield Town.

== Career ==
Holmes began his footballing career at vicar's cross dynamos before playing university football in Sheffield and joined Northern Premier League Premier Division side Matlock Town in summer 2006. He was the top goalscorer in the Premier Division with 34 goals in all league and cup competitions in his debut season in 2006–07, helping Matlock to the play-offs, and joined Football League Two side Mansfield Town in August 2007 on a one-year contract. After scoring three goals in 19 appearances, most as substitute, in the 2007–08 season, Holmes fell out of favour and joined AFC Telford United in March 2008, on loan with a 28-day recall option. After Mansfield Town were relegated to the Conference National at the end of the 2007–08 season, he was released by the club.

On 16 July 2008, Holmes signed for Northern Premier League Premier Division club Eastwood Town on a one-year contract. He signed for Glapwell in August 2010 and made his competitive debut against Market Drayton Town on 21 August 2010, scoring two goals. He made a blistering start to his Glapwell career by scoring three hat-tricks in September 2010, against Grantham Town, Belper Town and Sutton Coldfield Town.

He re-joined former club Matlock for the 2011–12 season but left the club in May 2012 having not been offered a new contract for the 2012–13 season, despite being the club's top scorer.

Holmes works as the Head of Media Studies and Head of Sixth Form at Tring School in Tring.
