= Glapwell F.C. =

Association football club in Glapwell, England

Glapwell FC
- Full name: Glapwell Football Club
- Nickname: Glappy
- Founded: 1989; 37 years ago
- Ground: Hall Corner, Glapwell, Derbyshire
- Capacity: 1250 (150 Seated)
- Chairman: Liam Wajs
- Manager: Jamie Durham
- League: Central Midlands Alliance Premier Division North
- 2025–26: Central Midlands Alliance Premier Division North, 14th of 16
- Website: https://www.glapwellfc.co.uk
| Home colours | Away colours | Third colours |

Glapwell Football Club are a football club based in Glapwell in Derbyshire, England. They are currently members of the Central Midlands Alliance Premier Division North and play at Hall Corner.

== History ==
After originally playing as the Young Vanish FC in the mid-to-late 1980s, the club played for the first time as Glapwell FC in 1989 when they joined the National League System for the first time playing in the Central Midlands Football League Division One. in 1992–93 under manager Roy Overton, and helped by the goalscoring form of former Chesterfield player Dave Waller, the club won the Supreme Division as well as the Wakefield Cup at Field Mill against bitter rivals Oakham United F.C. With Waller in the dugout two seasons later the club finished as runners-up and were finally suitably placed for promotion to the Northern Counties East Football League. The club's first season at their new level was a success, finishing fifth in Division One as well as reaching the second round of the FA Vase for the first time.

In 2002, former England international Chris Waddle played briefly for the club and in late 2008-early 2009, the club also had Dean Gordon, ex-Middlesbrough, play a handful of league games for them in the Northern Premier League Division One South.

There was gradual improvement, the first season ended in disappointment by missing out on the play-offs by just a single goal after a 3–1 defeat at Stamford A.F.C. on the final day of the season. A change in manager saw John Gaunt replace Les McJannet in the Hall Corner dug-out and the following season Glapwell were just inches away from promotion after an agonising 1–0 defeat at Chasetown F.C. in the play-off final in front of 1300 people. At the start of the 2010–11 season, the club entered an agreement with Mansfield Town F.C. to play their home games at their Field Mill ground. But when the Stags were locked out by their landlord at Christmas, Glapwell returned to play the second half of the season at Hall Corner. After a ninth-place finish and despite striker Ian Holmes's best efforts finishing top goalscorer of the league with 32 goals, poor results at the end of the season had cost them another shot at the play-offs, the club were forced to resign from the Northern Premier League at the end of the season due to ground licensing issues after a dispute with the local parish council.

So 2011–12 saw a return to the Central Midlands Football League with a brand new committee, management team and playing squad. However, the season on a whole was a disaster, finishing second bottom after winning only three games all season and registering 15 points. The 2012–13 season started much better under the guidance of former Mansfield Town F.C. physio Jason Truscott but the momentum was greatly disturbed when he left just before Christmas to join Northern Premier League side Hucknall Town F.C. along with his assistant Alex Weston and several of the first team squad. Former Heanor boss Jamie Bennett came in for the second half of the season and restored some momentum as the club finished in eighth place. Big things were expected ahead of the 2013–14 season but it started disastrously and after only one point from the opening four league games Bennett resigned after a 6–1 defeat at Sherwood Colliery. Two days later with Craig Humphreys in charge, Glapwell upset all the odds by recording a 3–1 victory at Clay Cross Town F.C. to start a bit of momentum. Humphreys eventually took the job on permanently at the end of the following month, appointing Carl Vickers as his assistant and results generally improved. The club did, however, suffer their heaviest league defeat at the end of September after a 10–0 thrashing at A.F.C. Mansfield who would go on to win the league at the end of the season. But a mid-table finish marked a great achievement for the club, and Humphreys, considering where the club had been when he took over. However, Humphreys and Vickers immediately resigned after the final game of the season and Glapwell were again looking for a new manager.

In 2014, in came former Alfreton player Jordan Hall who brought Neil Grayson back to the club as his assistant. The club finished sixth at the end of that season, breaking the record for most league goals scored in a season for the club with 88. Following Grayson's retirement from football in the summer of 2015, John Styring was promoted to assistant manager. After installing a squad he thought capable of winning the league, Hall's side stormed to the top of the league, breaking many records along the way. The club went on a 17-game unbeaten league run, breaking the 16 from 2009 to 2010 season, as well as recording the club's largest home and away league victories, both of which came against Dinnington Town F.C. They broke the club record for most league goals scored in a season, with still seven league games remaining, after smashing in 94 goals in only 21 league games, helped by nearly 60 from Josh Parfitt, Daniel Russell and Jake Ballinger.

The club has hosted the Jamie Walker Charity Match on a few occasions, most recently in 2013, where all proceeds go to local cancer charities where former Glapwell player Walker was successfully treated after his own diagnosis.

On 22 June 2016 Glapwell confirmed that the club had folded.

In July 2020, the newly reformed club with a new chairman, committee, management team, playing squad was accepted in to the Central Midlands League, Division One North. Dave Turner was appointed manager. The most notable player in the squad is ex-Accrington Stanley and Doncaster goalkeeper Ross Etheridge. A development team will also compete in the Midlands Regional Alliance; the youth team compete in the North Derbyshire Youth Football League and the club also run a KickStarts Sunday morning club for children between 4 and 7 years old on the pitch at Hall Corner.

In the Summer of 2023 Dave Turner announced that he would be moving to take the reins at South Normanton Athletic FC in the Central Midlands League South Division. Dave left with a promotion and 2x top 5 finishes along with a Derbyshire Divisional North Cup Final to his name. The same day Dave notified the club that he would be taking every single player across with him. This left Glapwell with no management or players for the upcoming season. With many applicants interested in the Glapwell job it was Jamie Durham that was selected to rebuild the squad from scratch. Jamie was joined by assistant Paul Macfarland who has a wealth of experience at Central Midlands standard and above along with experienced Coach Neal Chatterton.

== Notable former players ==
Players that have played in the Football League either before or after playing for Glapwell Football Club –

- Chris Waddle
- Dean Gordon
- Neil Grayson
- Lee Gregory
- Ben Starosta
- Ian Holmes
- Alan O'Hare
- Dave Waller
- Gary Castledine
- Ross Etheridge
- Martin Smith
- Mark Reynolds
- Ryan Goward
- Ashley Kitchen
- Willie Gamble
- Gary Mills
- Craig Mitchell
- Paul Smith
- Darren Roberts
- Chris Timons
- James Lindley
- Lee Wilson
- Willis Francis
- Patrick McGuire

== Honours ==
- Derbyshire Senior Cup
  - Winners: 1997–98
  - Runners-up: 2000–01
- Derbyshire Divisional North Cup
  - Runners-up: 2022–23
- Northern Counties East Football League Division One
  - Runners-up: 1999–00
- Central Midlands Football League Supreme Division
  - Winners: 1993–94
- Central Midlands Football League Premier Division
  - Winners: 1987–88, 2015–16
- Central Midlands Football League Division One
  - Winners: 1989–90
- Central Midlands Football League Floodlight Cup
  - Winners: 1993–94
- Central Midlands Football League Reserves Division
  - Winners: 1992–93

== Records ==
- FA Cup
  - Third qualifying round 2007–08
- FA Trophy
  - Third qualifying round 2008–09
- FA Vase
  - Second round 1996–97, 1998–99, 1999–00, 2000–01, 2001–02, 2002–03, 2003–04, 2004–05, 2005-06 & 2007-08
