= Belper Town F.C. =

Association football club in England

Coordinates: 53°1′38″N 1°29′14″W

Belper Town
- Full name: Belper Town Football Club
- Nickname: The Nailers
- Founded: 1883; reformed 1951
- Ground: Christchurch Meadow, Belper
- Capacity: 2,650 (500 seated)
- Chairman: Ian Woodward
- Manager: Lee Attenborough
- League: Northern Premier League Division One Midlands
- 2025–26: Northern Premier League Division One Midlands, 4th of 22
Home colours	Away colours

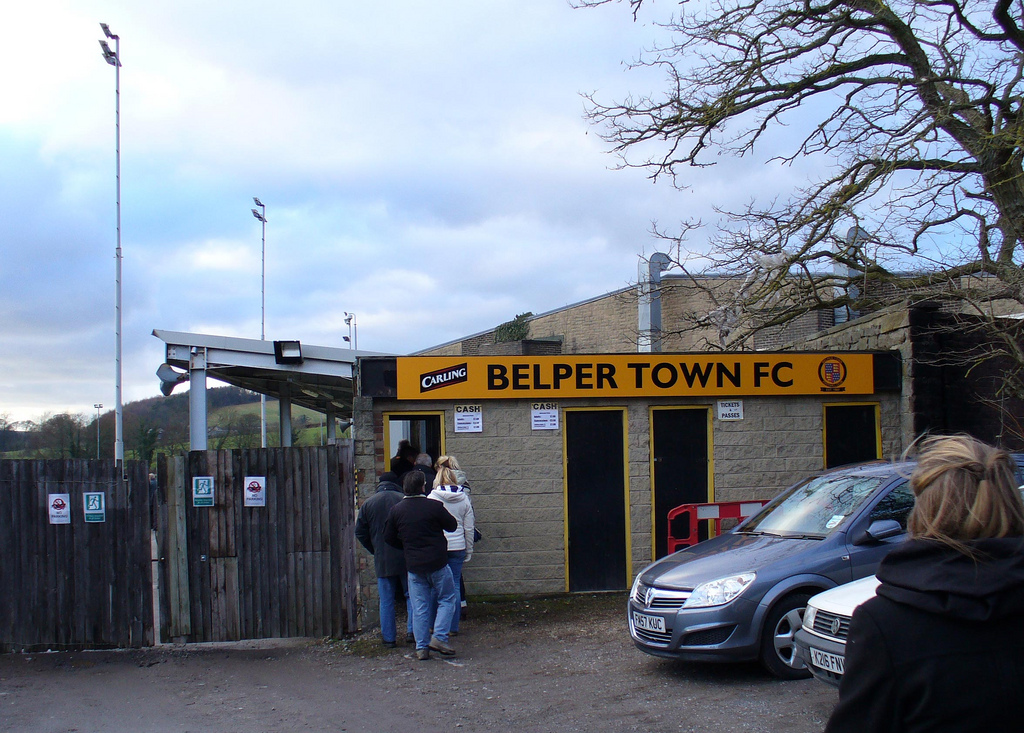
Entrance to Christchurch Meadow

Main Stand in August 2026

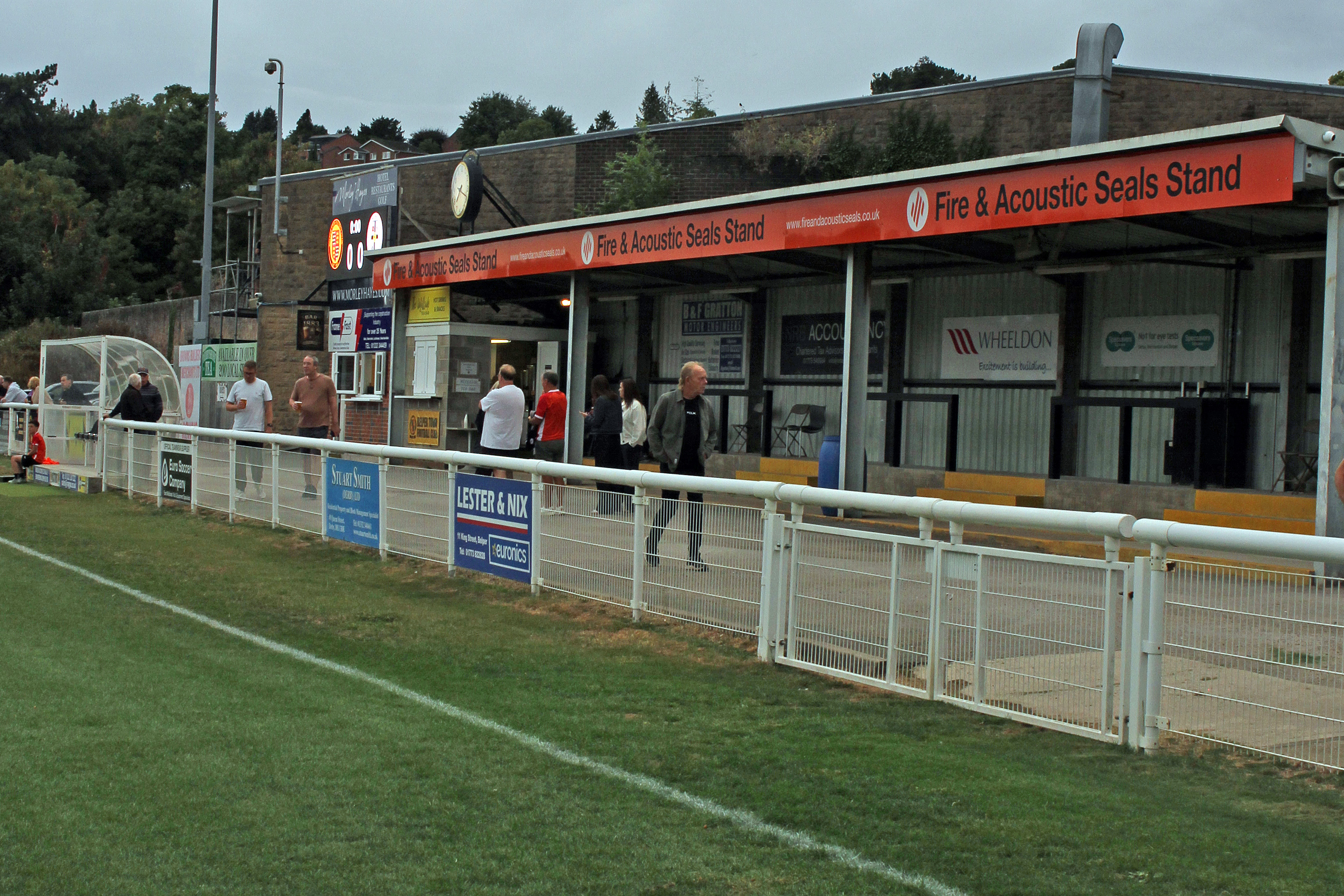
Church End stand in August 2026

Belper Town Football Club is a football club based in Belper, Derbyshire, England. They are currently members of the Northern Premier League Division One Midlands and play at Christchurch Meadow. The club are nicknamed the "Nailers" due to the town's nail-making industry.

== History ==
The club were originally formed in 1883 and reached the first round of the FA Cup in 1887–88, losing 3–2 to The Wednesday. They were founder members of the Derbyshire Senior League in 1890, and finished as runners-up in 1895–96. By the mid-1900s the club were playing in the Mid-Derbyshire League and were league champions in 1904–05. In 1906–07 they were runners-up, The league was rebranded as the Derbyshire Alliance in 1907 and merged with the Notts & District League in 1908 to form the Notts & Derbyshire League, with Belper as founder members. However, they left the league midway through the 1911–12 season and folded due to financial difficulties.

The club reformed in 1951 and joined Division One of the Central Alliance, taking over the fixtures of Mansfield Town 'A', who had withdrawn from the league. In 1956 the league was restructured, with Belper placed in Division One North. They finished as runners-up in 1956–57 and were champions in 1958–59, a season in which they also won the Derbyshire Senior Cup for the first time. When the Midland League was re-established in 1961, Belper joined the league. They finished bottom of the league in 1969–70. After it was split into two divisions, Belper were placed in the Premier Division, of which they finished bottom in 1978–79. However, they were not relegated, and went on to win the Premier Division and the Derbyshire Senior Cup the following season.

In 1982 the league merged with the Yorkshire League to form the Northern Counties East League, with Belper placed in the Premier Division. They won the Premier Division in 1984–85 and the President's Cup in 1995–96. The following season they finished as runners-up in the Premier Division and were promoted to Division One of the Northern Premier League. When Division One was split in 2007, the club were placed in Division One South. After finishing as runners-up in 2008–09 (missing out on the title on goal difference) they qualified for the promotion play-offs. Although they beat Rushall Olympic 1–0 in the semi-finals, they lost the final 1–0 to Stocksbridge Park Steels. A third-place finish in 2012–13 led to another play-off campaign, which resulted in them losing 4–2 to Stamford in the semi-finals. However, after finishing fourth the following season, they defeated Leek Town 2–0 in the semi-finals and Mickleover Sports 1–0 in the final to earn promotion to the Premier Division.

Belper's first season in the Premier Division saw them finish bottom of the table, resulting in relegation back to Division One South. In 2021–22 they finished fifth in Division One Midlands, qualifying for the promotion play-offs position. After beating Stamford 2–1 in the semi-finals, they defeated Chasetown 1–0 in the final to earn promotion back to the Premier Division. However, they finished bottom of the Premier Division the following season and were relegated to Division One East. The club finished fourth in Division One East in 2024–25, going on to lose 2–1 to Stocksbridge Park Steels in the play-off semi-finals. Following the end of the season, they were transferred to Division One Midlands. They finished fourth in Division One Midlands the following season, going on to beat Basford United on penalties in the play-off semi-finals, before losing on penalties to Racing Club Warwick in the final.

== Ground ==
The club originally played at the Acorn Ground, before moving to Christchurch Meadow in 1951, taking over from a junior team, Field Head. The ground initially had a single stand on the northern side of the pitch, but it was demolished in the early 1960s to allow the adjacent West Mill to be extended. Parts of it were reused to build a new stand on the opposite side, although the stand ran from the halfway line to one corner rather than being positioned centrally.

The club bought the freehold to the ground in 1986 for £6,000. New dressing rooms were built in 1999 and new 500-seat stand opened in 2003. The ground also has a covered stand with a capacity of 300, a covered terrace at the Church End of the ground (built in 2021) and another covered area at the River End.

The record attendance of 3,200 was set for a match against Ilkeston Town in 1955.

== Honours ==
- Northern Premier League
  - President's Cup winners 2009–10
- Northern Counties East League
  - Premier Division champions 1984–85
  - President's Cup winners 1995–96
- Midland League
  - Premier Division champions 1979–80
- Central Alliance
  - Division One North champions 1958–59
- Mid-Derbyshire League
  - Champions 1904–05
- Derbyshire Senior Cup
  - Winners 1958–59, 1961–62, 1963–64, 1979–80, 2007–08

== Records ==
- Best FA Cup performance: First round, 1887–88
- Best FA Trophy performance: Second round, 2000–01 (replay)
- Best FA Vase performance: Semi-finals, 1994–95
- Record attendance: 3,200 vs Ilkeston Town, 1955
- Biggest win: 15–2 vs Nottingham Forest 'A', 1956
- Worst defeat: 12–0 vs Goole Town, 1965
- Most appearances: Craig Smithurst, 678
- Most goals: Mick Lakin, 231
- Record transfer fee received: £2,000 from Hinckley United for Craig Smith
- Record transfer fee paid: £2,000 to Ilkeston Town for Jamie Eaton, 2001

== See also ==
- Belper Town F.C. players
- Belper Town F.C. managers
