= Rainworth Miners Welfare F.C. =

Association football club in England

Coordinates: 53°07′12.04″N 1°06′54.57″W

Rainworth Miners Welfare
- Full name: Rainworth Miners Welfare Football Club
- Nickname: The Wrens
- Founded: 1922
- Ground: Welfare Ground, Kirklington Road, Rainworth, Mansfield
- Capacity: 2,201 (221 seats)
- Chairman: Tom Ward
- Manager: Damon Parkinson
- League: Nottinghamshire Senior League Premier Division
- 2025–26: United Counties League Division One, 23rd of 23 (relegated)
Home colours	Away colours

Rainworth Miners Welfare F.C. is a football club formed in 1922, based in Rainworth, near Mansfield, Nottinghamshire, England.

== History ==
The club (also sometimes styled as Rufford Colliery F.C.) spent the greater part of their existence in the Notts Alliance, winning that league 10 times, including a record six in succession between 1977 and 1983. They also recorded league cup and county cup success in that spell, and had some lengthy runs in the FA Vase, including reaching the final in 1981–82, when they lost the final 3–0 to Forest Green Rovers at Wembley Stadium.

After a period of less success, the club won two more Alliance titles in the mid-1990s, and then began to build for a rise up the football pyramid. Floodlights had been erected at their Kirklington Road ground in 1991, with covered accommodation following, which has since been extended, and seating installed. This enabled the club to be accepted for the Central Midlands League in 2003. They finished third in the lower ("Premier") division in their first season, earning promotion to the Supreme Division where they played until they were promoted to the Northern Counties East League Division One in 2007.

On 18 April 2009, they earned promotion to the Premier Division as runners-up, after a 3–0 away win against Worsbrough Bridge Athletic.

In May 2010, Bridlington Town formally notified the FA that they would not accept promotion to the Northern Premier League. Consequently, Rainworth MW were promoted to the NPL Division One South ready for the 2010–11 season.

In July 2012, Rainworth MW hosted a pre-season friendly away against newly formed local side A.F.C. Mansfield, as AFC's first fixture.

On 13 April 2015, it was announced that the club had resigned from the NPL.

== Records ==
- Best FA Cup performance: Third qualifying round, 2007–08
- Best FA Trophy performance: First qualifying round, 2012–13
- Best FA Vase performance: Runners-up, 1981–82

== Club honours ==
- Notts Alliance champions – 1971–72, 1977–78, 1978–79, 1979–80, 1980–81, 1981–82, 1982–83, 1990–91, 1995–96, 1996–97
- Notts Alliance Senior Cup winners – 1970–71, 1977–78, 1981–82, 1982–83, 1994–95
- Nottinghamshire Senior Cup winners – 1980–81, 1981–82
- F.A. Vase runners-up – 1981–82
- Record attendance – 5071 v Barton Rovers, 1982 F.A. Vase semi-final second leg.
