= 2003–04 Mansfield Town F.C. season =

Mansfield Town
2003–04 season
- Manager: Keith Curle
- Stadium: Field Mill
- Football League Third Division: 5th
- FA Cup: Third round
- League Cup: First round
- Football League Trophy: First round
Home colours

During the 2003–04 English football season, Mansfield Town Football Club competed in the Football League Third Division where they finished in 5th position with 75 points, reaching the 2004 Football League Third Division play-off final where they lost on penalties to Huddersfield Town.

== Final league table ==
| Pos | Team | Pld | W | D | L | GF | GA | GD | Pts | Promotion or relegation |
|---|---|---|---|---|---|---|---|---|---|---|
| 3 | Torquay United (P) | 46 | 23 | 12 | 11 | 68 | 44 | +24 | 81 | Promotion to Football League One |
| 4 | Huddersfield Town (O, P) | 46 | 23 | 12 | 11 | 68 | 52 | +16 | 81 | Qualification for the Third Division play-offs |
| 5 | Mansfield Town | 46 | 22 | 9 | 15 | 76 | 62 | +14 | 75 | Qualification for the Third Division play-offs |
| 6 | Northampton Town | 46 | 22 | 9 | 15 | 58 | 51 | +7 | 75 | Qualification for the Third Division play-offs |
| 7 | Lincoln City | 46 | 19 | 17 | 10 | 68 | 47 | +21 | 74 | Qualification for the Third Division play-offs |

Rules for classification: In the Football League goals scored (GF) takes precedence over goal difference (GD).
(O) Play-off winners; (P) Promoted

== Results ==
Mansfield Town's score comes first

=== Legend ===
| Win | Draw | Loss |

=== Football League Third Division ===
| Match | Date | Opponent | Venue | Result | Attendance | Scorers |
|---|---|---|---|---|---|---|
| 1 | 9 August 2003 | Kidderminster Harriers | A | 1–2 | 3,180 | Corden |
| 2 | 16 August 2003 | Leyton Orient | H | 1–1 | 3,920 | Dimech |
| 3 | 23 August 2003 | Southend United | A | 3–0 | 3,837 | Christie (3) |
| 4 | 26 August 2003 | Scunthorpe United | H | 5–0 | 5,142 | Christie, Day, Mendes, Lawrence (2) |
| 5 | 30 August 2003 | Swansea City | A | 1–4 | 6,991 | Vaughan |
| 6 | 6 September 2003 | Macclesfield Town | H | 3–2 | 4,206 | Artell, Mendes, Lawrence |
| 7 | 13 September 2003 | Oxford United | A | 1–1 | 5,625 | MacKenzie |
| 8 | 16 September 2003 | Bury | H | 5–3 | 4,145 | Lawrence (2), Corden (2), Mendes |
| 9 | 20 September 2003 | Yeovil Town | H | 0–1 | 5,270 | |
| 10 | 27 September 2003 | Cambridge United | A | 2–1 | 4,068 | Lawrence, Disley |
| 11 | 30 September 2003 | Bristol Rovers | A | 3–1 | 8,451 | Disley (2), Mendes |
| 12 | 4 October 2003 | Darlington | H | 3–1 | 4,621 | Corden, Christie, Tony Vaughan |
| 13 | 11 October 2003 | York City | H | 2–0 | 4,914 | Artell, Beardsley |
| 14 | 18 October 2003 | Doncaster Rovers | A | 2–4 | 8,500 | Lawrence, Corden |
| 15 | 21 October 2003 | Torquay United | A | 0–1 | 2,773 | |
| 16 | 25 October 2003 | Cheltenham Town | H | 4–0 | 4,095 | Lawrence (2), Larkin (2) |
| 17 | 1 November 2003 | Boston United | H | 2–1 | 5,161 | Mendes (2) |
| 18 | 15 November 2003 | Carlisle United | A | 2–0 | 4,154 | Mendes, Corden |
| 19 | 22 November 2003 | Huddersfield Town | H | 3–3 | 5,823 | Day, Artell, Disley |
| 20 | 29 November 2003 | Northampton Town | A | 3–0 | 5,019 | Disley, Lawrence, Christie |
| 21 | 13 December 2003 | Lincoln City | H | 1–2 | 5,797 | Lawrence |
| 22 | 20 December 2003 | Hull City | A | 1–0 | 15,005 | MacKenzie |
| 23 | 26 December 2003 | Rochdale | H | 1–0 | 6,963 | Larkin |
| 24 | 28 December 2003 | Macclesfield Town | A | 1–1 | 6,963 | Christie |
| 25 | 10 January 2004 | Kidderminster Harriers | H | 1–0 | 4,574 | Day |
| 26 | 17 January 2004 | Leyton Orient | A | 1–3 | 4,072 | Buxton |
| 27 | 24 January 2004 | Southend United | H | 1–0 | 4,292 | Corden |
| 28 | 27 January 2004 | Scunthorpe United | A | 0–0 | 3,113 | Corden |
| 29 | 7 February 2004 | Rochdale | A | 0–3 | 3,157 | |
| 30 | 14 February 2004 | York City | A | 2–1 | 4,068 | Lawrence, Pacquette |
| 31 | 21 February 2004 | Doncaster Rovers | H | 1–2 | 7,724 | Lawrence |
| 32 | 28 February 2004 | Cheltenham Town | A | 2–4 | 3,818 | Corden, Christie |
| 33 | 6 March 2004 | Hull City | H | 1–0 | 6,859 | D'Jaffo |
| 34 | 13 March 2004 | Lincoln City | A | 1–4 | 6,034 | Lawrence |
| 35 | 16 March 2004 | Bury | A | 0–3 | 2,119 | |
| 36 | 16 March 2004 | Swansea City | H | 1–1 | 2,119 | Lawrence |
| 37 | 27 March 2004 | Yeovil Town | A | 1–1 | 6,002 | Day |
| 38 | 30 March 2004 | Torquay United | H | 2–1 | 4,552 | Larkin, Mendes |
| 39 | 3 April 2004 | Cambridge United | H | 1–1 | 4,325 | Mendes |
| 40 | 3 April 2004 | Oxford United | H | 3–1 | 5,132 | Mendes, Larkin, Day |
| 41 | 10 April 2004 | Darlington | A | 0–1 | 4,946 | |
| 42 | 12 April 2004 | Bristol Rovers | H | 0–0 | 4,735 | |
| 43 | 17 April 2004 | Boston United | A | 2–1 | 3,826 | Larkin, Lawrence |
| 44 | 24 April 2004 | Carlisle United | H | 2–3 | 5,361 | Lawrence (2) |
| 45 | 1 May 2004 | Huddersfield Town | A | 3–1 | 18,663 | Lawrence, Day, Mendes |
| 46 | 8 May 2004 | Northampton Town | H | 1–2 | 8,065 | Larkin |

=== Football League Third Division play-offs ===
| Round | Date | Opponent | Venue | Result | Attendance | Scorers |
|---|---|---|---|---|---|---|
| Semi-final 1st leg | 16 May 2004 | Northampton Town | A | 2–0 | 6,960 | Day, Mendes |
| Semi-final 2nd leg | 20 May 2004 | Northampton Town | H | 1–3 (5–4 pens) | 9,243 | Curtis |
| Final | 31 May 2004 | Huddersfield Town | N | 0–0 (1–4 pens) | 37,298 | |

=== FA Cup ===
| Round | Date | Opponent | Venue | Result | Attendance | Scorers |
|---|---|---|---|---|---|---|
| R1 | 8 November 2003 | Bishop's Stortford | H | 6–0 | 4,679 | MacKenzie (3), Mendes, Larkin, Curtis |
| R2 | 5 December 2003 | Wycombe Wanderers | A | 1–1 | 3,212 | Christie |
| R2 Replay | 16 December 2003 | Wycombe Wanderers | H | 3–2 | 5,512 | Lawrence (3) |
| R3 | 3 January 2004 | Burnley | H | 0–2 | 8,290 | |

=== League Cup ===
| Round | Date | Opponent | Venue | Result | Attendance | Scorers |
|---|---|---|---|---|---|---|
| R1 | 13 August 2003 | Sunderland | H | 1–2 | 5,665 | Kyle (o.g.) |

=== Football League Trophy ===
| Round | Date | Opponent | Venue | Result | Attendance | Scorers |
|---|---|---|---|---|---|---|
| R1 | 14 October 2003 | Stockport County | H | 1–2 | 3,718 | Day |

== Squad statistics ==
| No. | Pos. | Name | League | | FA Cup | | League Cup | | League Trophy | | Play-offs | | Total | |
| No. | Pos. | Name | Apps | Goals | Apps | Goals | Apps | Goals | Apps | Goals | Apps | Goals | Apps | Goals |
|---|---|---|---|---|---|---|---|---|---|---|---|---|---|---|
| 1 | GK | (England) Kevin Pilkington | 46 | 0 | 4 | 0 | 1 | 0 | 1 | 0 | 3 | 0 | 55 | 0 |
| 2 | DF | (England) Jamie Clarke | 11(1) | 0 | 1(1) | 0 | 1 | 0 | 1 | 0 | 0 | 0 | 14(2) | 0 |
| 3 | DF | (England) Adam Eaton | 3 | 0 | 0 | 0 | 0 | 0 | 0 | 0 | 3 | 0 | 6 | 0 |
| 4 | DF | (England) Tom Curtis | 34(4) | 0 | 3 | 1 | 1 | 0 | 0 | 0 | 3 | 1 | 41(4) | 2 |
| 5 | DF | (Wales) Rhys Day | 40(1) | 6 | 4 | 0 | 0(1) | 0 | 1 | 1 | 3 | 1 | 48(2) | 9 |
| 6 | DF | (England) Tony Vaughan | 32 | 2 | 3 | 0 | 0 | 0 | 0 | 0 | 0 | 0 | 35 | 2 |
| 7 | MF | (Republic of Ireland) Liam Lawrence | 41 | 18 | 4 | 3 | 1 | 0 | 0 | 0 | 3 | 0 | 49 | 21 |
| 8 | MF | (England) Craig Disley | 18(16) | 5 | 3(1) | 0 | 0 | 0 | 1 | 0 | 3 | 0 | 25(17) | 5 |
| 9 | FW | (Republic of Ireland) Colin Larkin | 19(18) | 7 | 1(1) | 1 | 0 | 0 | 1 | 0 | 0(3) | 0 | 21(22) | 8 |
| 10 | FW | (Dominica) Richard Pacquette | 3(2) | 1 | 0 | 0 | 0 | 0 | 0 | 0 | 0 | 0 | 3(2) | 1 |
| 11 | MF | (England) Wayne Corden | 40(4) | 8 | 2(1) | 0 | 1 | 0 | 1 | 0 | 3 | 0 | 47(5) | 8 |
| 12 | DF | (England) Bobby Hassell | 33(1) | 0 | 4 | 0 | 1 | 0 | 0 | 0 | 3 | 0 | 41(1) | 0 |
| 13 | GK | (England) Jason White | 0 | 0 | 0 | 0 | 0 | 0 | 0 | 0 | 0 | 0 | 0 | 0 |
| 14 | MF | (England) Neil MacKenzie | 25(7) | 2 | 2 | 3 | 0(1) | 0 | 1 | 0 | 0(3) | 0 | 28(11) | 5 |
| 15 | DF | (England) Alex John-Baptiste | 14(3) | 0 | 0 | 0 | 0 | 0 | 1 | 0 | 3 | 0 | 18(3) | 0 |
| 16 | DF | (England) Jake Buxton | 9 | 1 | 0(1) | 0 | 0 | 0 | 1 | 0 | 0 | 0 | 10(1) | 1 |
| 17 | FW | (England) Chris Beardsley | 2(13) | 1 | 0(1) | 0 | 0 | 0 | 1 | 0 | 0 | 0 | 3(14) | 1 |
| 18 | FW | (England) Craig Mitchell | 0(1) | 0 | 0 | 0 | 0 | 0 | 0 | 0 | 0 | 0 | 0(1) | 0 |
| 19 | FW | (England) Andy White | 2(12) | 0 | 0 | 0 | 0(1) | 0 | 0(1) | 0 | 0 | 0 | 2(14) | 0 |
| 20 | FW | (Montserrat) Junior Mendes | 36(3) | 11 | 4 | 1 | 1 | 0 | 0 | 0 | 3 | 1 | 44(3) | 13 |
| 21 | DF | (Malta) Luke Dimech | 17(3) | 1 | 1(1) | 0 | 1 | 0 | 0 | 0 | 0 | 0 | 19(4) | 1 |
| 22 | FW | (England) Iyseden Christie | 24(3) | 8 | 2(1) | 1 | 1 | 0 | 0 | 0 | 0 | 0 | 27(3) | 9 |
| 24 | MF | (England) Lee Williamson | 29(6) | 0 | 3 | 0 | 1 | 0 | 1 | 0 | 3 | 0 | 37(7) | 0 |
| 25 | DF | (England) David Artell | 24(2) | 3 | 3(1) | 0 | 1 | 0 | 0(1) | 0 | 0 | 0 | 28(4) | 3 |
| 26 | FW | (England) Lance Mulligan | 0(1) | 0 | 0 | 0 | 0 | 0 | 0 | 0 | 0 | 0 | 0(1) | 0 |
| 27 | DF | (England) Mark Hurst | 0 | 0 | 0 | 0 | 0 | 0 | 0 | 0 | 0 | 0 | 0 | 0 |
| 28 | MF | (England) Dean Hankey | 0 | 0 | 0 | 0 | 0 | 0 | 0 | 0 | 0 | 0 | 0 | 0 |
| 29 | MF | (England) Tom Curle | 0(1) | 0 | 0 | 0 | 0 | 0 | 0 | 0 | 0 | 0 | 0(1) | 0 |
| 30 | FW | (Benin) Laurent D'Jaffo | 4(4) | 1 | 0 | 0 | 0 | 0 | 0 | 0 | 0(3) | 0 | 4(7) | 1 |
| – | – | Own goals | – | 0 | – | 0 | – | 1 | – | 0 | – | 0 | – | 1 |
