= 2002–03 Mansfield Town F.C. season =

Mansfield Town
2002–03 season
- Manager: Stuart Watkiss; Keith Curle
- Stadium: Field Mill
- Second Division: 23rd (relegated)
- FA Cup: Second round
- League Cup: First round
- Football League Trophy: First round
Home colours

During the 2002–03 English football season, Mansfield Town Football Club competed in the Football League Second Division where they finished in 23rd position with 44 points, suffering an intimidate return to the fourth tier. Mansfield's downfall was their leaky defence as despite scoring 66 goals they conceded 97, the most of any team in 2002–03.

== Final league table ==
Pos	Team	Pld	W	D	L	GF	GA	GD	Pts	Promotion or relegation
20	Chesterfield	46	14	8	24	43	73	−30	50	
21	Cheltenham Town (R)	46	10	18	18	53	68	−15	48	Relegation to Football League Third Division
22	Huddersfield Town (R)	46	11	12	23	39	61	−22	45	Relegation to Football League Third Division
23	Mansfield Town (R)	46	12	8	26	66	97	−31	44	Relegation to Football League Third Division
24	Northampton Town (R)	46	10	9	27	40	79	−39	39	Relegation to Football League Third Division

Rules for classification: In the Football League goals scored (GF) takes precedence over goal difference (GD).
(R) Relegated

== Results ==
Mansfield Town's score comes first

=== Legend ===
Win	Draw	Loss

=== Football League Second Division ===
Match	Date	Opponent	Venue	Result	Attendance	Scorers
1	10 August 2002	Plymouth Argyle	H	4–2	5,309	White (2), Disley, Larkin
2	13 August 2002	Wigan Athletic	A	2–3	5,837	Larkin (2)
3	17 August 2002	Wycombe Wanderers	A	3–3	5,057	Corden (2), Christie
4	24 August 2002	Chesterfield	H	0–2	7,258	
5	26 August 2002	Stockport County	A	0–2	5,190	
6	31 August 2002	Crewe Alexandra	H	0–5	4,183	
7	7 September 2002	Queens Park Rangers	H	0–4	4,581	
8	14 September 2002	Oldham Athletic	A	1–6	5,490	Corden
9	17 September 2002	Luton Town	A	3–2	6,004	Lawrence, Christie, Sellars
10	21 September 2002	Cheltenham Town	H	0–2	4,116	
11	28 September 2002	Northampton Town	A	0–2	5,594	
12	5 October 2002	Tranmere Rovers	H	6–1	3,668	Lawrence, Sellars, Larkin, MacKenzie, Christie (2)
13	12 October 2002	Peterborough United	A	0–0	5,067	
14	19 October 2002	Huddersfield Town	H	0–2	4,998	
15	26 October 2002	Swindon Town	A	1–2	4,136	Lawrence
16	29 October 2002	Cardiff City	H	0–1	3,441	
17	1 November 2002	Colchester United	H	4–2	3,414	Christie (4)
18	9 November 2002	Notts County	A	2–2	10,302	Christie, Lawrence
19	23 November 2002	Bristol City	H	4–5	4,801	Christie (2), Corden (2)
20	30 November 2002	Port Vale	A	2–4	3,880	Christie, Corden
21	14 December 2002	Blackpool	H	4–0	4,001	Christie, Lawrence, Corden (2)
22	21 December 2002	Barnsley	A	1–0	10,495	White
23	26 December 2002	Stockport County	H	4–2	6,434	Christie, Corden (2), Disley
24	28 December 2002	Brentford	A	0–1	5,844	
25	1 January 2003	Crewe Alexandra	A	0–2	6,931	
26	11 January 2003	Wycombe Wanderers	H	0–0	4,811	
27	18 January 2003	Chesterfield	A	2–1	6,813	Lawrence, Disley
28	28 January 2003	Wigan Athletic	H	1–2	5,524	Christie
29	1 February 2003	Plymouth Argyle	A	1–3	8,030	Lawrence
30	4 February 2003	Brentford	H	0–0	3,735	
31	8 February 2003	Notts County	H	3–2	8,134	White, Corden, Mitchell
32	14 February 2003	Colchester United	A	0–1	3,247	
33	22 February 2003	Queens Park Rangers	A	2–2	11,942	Christie (2)
34	1 March 2003	Oldham Athletic	H	0–1	5,712	
35	4 March 2003	Luton Town	H	3–2	4,829	Christie, Corden, Day
36	8 March 2003	Cheltenham Town	A	1–3	3,881	Lawrence
37	15 March 2003	Swindon Town	H	2–1	4,471	Corden, Mendes
38	18 March 2003	Huddersfield Town	A	1–1	8,756	Corden
39	22 March 2003	Cardiff City	A	0–1	13,009	
40	29 March 2003	Peterborough United	H	1–5	5,653	Corden
41	5 April 2003	Port Vale	H	0–1	4,538	
42	12 April 2003	Bristol City	A	2–5	12,013	Disley, Butler (o.g.)
43	19 April 2003	Barnsley	H	0–1	4,873	
44	21 April 2003	Blackpool	A	3–3	6,173	White, Larkin, Clarke
45	29 April 2003	Tranmere Rovers	A	1–3	10,418	Lawrence
46	3 May 2003	Northampton Town	H	2–1	3,928	Lawrence, White

=== FA Cup ===
Round	Date	Opponent	Venue	Result	Attendance	Scorers
R1	16 November 2002	Team Bath	A	4–2	5,496	Lawrence (2), Christie, Tisdale (o.g.)
R2	7 December 2002	Crewe Alexandra	A	0–3	4,563	

=== League Cup ===
Round	Date	Opponent	Venue	Result	Attendance	Scorers
R1	10 September 2002	Derby County	H	1–3	5,788	Moore

=== Football League Trophy ===
Round	Date	Opponent	Venue	Result	Attendance	Scorers
R1	22 October 2002	Crewe Alexandra	H	0–4	1,874	

== Squad statistics ==
No.	Pos.	Name	League		FA Cup		League Cup		League Trophy		Total	
No.	Pos.	Name	Apps	Goals	Apps	Goals	Apps	Goals	Apps	Goals	Apps	Goals
1	GK	(England) Kevin Pilkington	32	0	2	0	1	0	1	0	36	0
2	DF	(England) Bobby Hassell	19(1)	0	0	0	0	0	0	0	19(1)	0
4	DF	(England) Neil MacKenzie	16(8)	1	2	0	1	0	1	0	20(8)	1
5	DF	(England) Tom Curtis	23	0	0	0	0	0	0	0	23	0
5	DF	(England) Neil Moore	18	0	1(1)	0	1	1	1	0	21(1)	1
6	DF	(England) Stuart Reddington	5(2)	0	0	0	1	0	0	0	6(2)	0
6	DF	(England) Matt Gadsby	13(7)	0	2	0	0	0	0	0	15(7)	0
7	MF	(Republic of Ireland) Liam Lawrence	40(3)	10	1	2	1	0	1	0	43(3)	12
8	MF	(England) Lee Williamson	28(12)	0	1	0	1	0	1	0	31(12)	0
9	FW	(England) Colin Little	5	0	0	0	0	0	0	0	5	0
10	MF	(England) Craig Disley	39(3)	4	2	0	1	0	0	0	42(3)	4
11	MF	(England) Wayne Corden	37(7)	13	2	0	1	0	1	0	41(7)	13
12	MF	(England) Jamie Clarke	15(5)	1	2	0	1	0	1	0	19(5)	1
14	MF	(England) David Jervis	4(1)	0	0(1)	0	0	0	0	0	4(2)	0
14	DF	(England) Ben Doane	11	0	0	0	0	0	0	0	11	0
15	FW	(England) Andy White	19(9)	6	0	0	0(1)	0	0(1)	0	19(11)	6
16	FW	(England) Danny Bacon	0(6)	0	1(1)	0	0(1)	0	0(1)	0	1(8)	0
17	DF	(England) Adam Eaton	20	0	0	0	0	0	0	0	20	0
18	FW	(Montserrat) Junior Mendes	18	1	0	0	0	0	0	0	18	1
19	DF	(Wales) Rhys Day	23	1	1	0	0	0	0	0	24	1
19	DF	(England) Tony Vaughan	4	0	0	0	0	0	0	0	4	0
20	DF	(England) Scott Sellars	12(2)	2	0	0	0	0	0	0	12(2)	2
21	FW	(Republic of Ireland) Colin Larkin	13(9)	7	2	0	0	0	1	0	16(9)	7
22	FW	(England) Iyseden Christie	29(8)	18	2	1	1	0	1	0	33(8)	19
23	DF	(England) Mark Hurst	1	0	0	0	0(1)	0	1	0	2(1)	0
24	MF	(England) Danny Holyoak	0(2)	0	0	0	0	0	1	0	1(2)	0
25	FW	(England) Craig Mitchell	3(12)	1	0	0	0	0	0	0	3(12)	1
25	DF	(England) Mark Lever	15	0	1	0	0	0	0	0	16	0
26	DF	(England) Lee Glover	0(2)	0	0	0	0	0	0	0	0(2)	0
26	DF	(England) Jake Buxton	3	0	0	0	0	0	0(1)	0	3(1)	0
27	DF	(England) Alex John-Baptiste	4	0	0	0	0	0	0	0	4	0
27	DF	(Republic of Ireland) Damien Delaney	7	0	0	0	0	0	0	0	7	0
28	MF	(England) Chris Beardsley	1(4)	0	0	0	0	0	0	0	1(4)	0
28	DF	(England) Peter Clark	4	0	0	0	1	0	0	0	5	0
29	DF	(England) Keith Curle	11(3)	0	0	0	0	0	0	0	11(3)	0
29	GK	(Netherlands) Arjan van Heusden	5	0	0	0	0	0	0	0	5	0
30	GK	(England) Jason White	0(1)	0	0	0	0	0	0	0	0(1)	0
31	MF	(England) Andy Jones	0(1)	0	0	0	0	0	0	0	0(1)	0
32	GK	(England) Keith Welch	9	0	0	0	0	0	0	0	9	0
32	FW	(England) Dean Hankey	0(1)	0	0	0	0	0	0	0	0(1)	0
–	–	Own goals	–	1	–	1	–	0	–	0	–	2
