= 2004 Football League Third Division play-off final =

Association football match

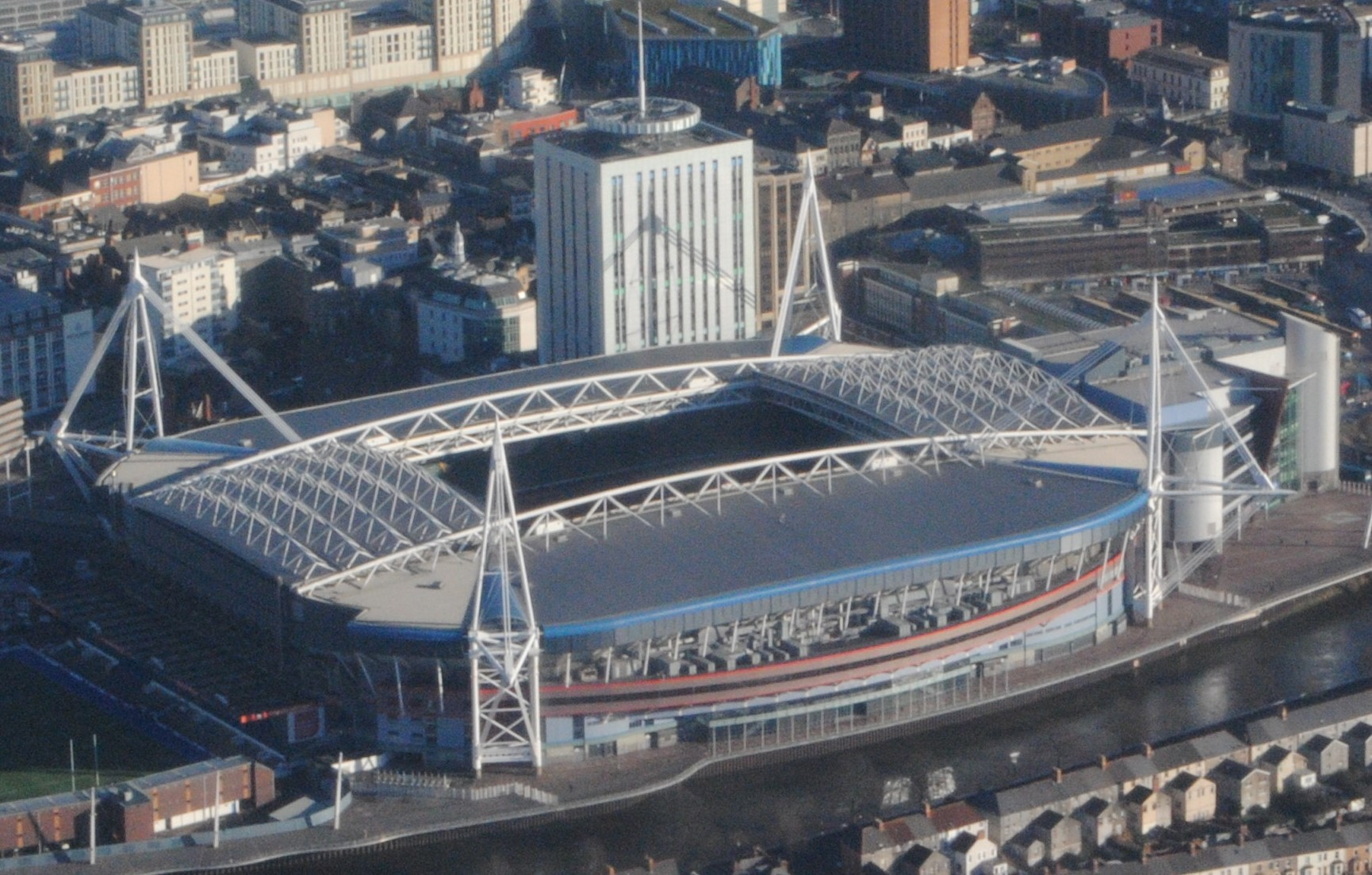
- The match was played at the Millennium Stadium.
Huddersfield Town	Mansfield Town
0	0
- Huddersfield Town won 4–1 on penalties
- Date: 31 May 2004
- Venue: Millennium Stadium, Cardiff
- Referee: Mark Clattenburg (Durham)
- Attendance: 37,298

The 2004 Football League Third Division play-off final was an association football match which was played on 31 May 2004 at the Millennium Stadium, Cardiff, between Huddersfield Town and Mansfield Town to determine the fourth and final team to gain promotion from the Football League Third Division to Football League One (the renamed Second Division). The top three teams of the 2003–04 Third Division season, Doncaster Rovers, Hull City and Torquay United, gained automatic promotion to League One, while those placed from fourth to seventh place in the table took part in play-offs. The winners of the semi-finals competed for the final place for the 2004–05 season in Football League One. Huddersfield and Mansfield defeated Lincoln City and Northampton Town, respectively, in the semi-finals.

The final kicked off around 3 p.m. in front of a crowd of 37,298 and was refereed by Mark Clattenburg. Both sides had chances to score in regular time and in the final minute of the match, Colin Larkin put the ball into the Huddersfield net but the goal was disallowed as the ball had gone out of play during the build-up. The match was goalless after 90 minutes, sending it into extra time. Tony Carss went close for Huddersfield in the first period of additional time while Laurent D'Jaffo and Wayne Corden missed chances for Mansfield, but with no score after 120 minutes, a penalty shootout was required to decide the outcome of the match. Huddersfield scored their first three penalties while Mansfield converted one, and Lee Fowler scored Huddersfield's fourth penalty to secure a 4–1 victory for his side and promotion to the 2nd Division or League 1 after the change.

Huddersfield's next season saw them finish in ninth place in Football League One, three positions and one point below the play-offs. Mansfield ended their following season in thirteenth position in Football League Two (the renamed Third Division).

== Route to the final ==
Football League Third Division final table, leading positions
Pos	Team	Pld	W	D	L	GF	GA	GD	Pts
1	Doncaster Rovers	46	27	11	8	79	45	+34	92
2	Hull City	46	25	13	8	82	44	+38	88
3	Torquay United	46	23	12	11	68	44	+24	81
4	Huddersfield Town	46	23	12	11	68	52	+16	81
5	Mansfield Town	45	22	14	9	76	62	+14	80
6	Northampton Town	46	22	9	15	58	51	+7	75
7	Lincoln City	46	19	17	10	68	47	+21	74

Huddersfield Town finished the regular 2003–04 season in fourth place in the Football League Third Division, the fourth tier of the English football league system, one position ahead of Mansfield Town. Both therefore missed out on the three automatic places for promotion to the Second Division and instead took part in the play-offs to determine the fourth promoted team. Huddersfield Town finished level on points with Torquay United (who were promoted in third place with superior goal difference), seven behind Hull City (who were promoted in second) and eleven behind league winners Doncaster Rovers. Huddersfield missed out on automatic promotion on the final day of the regular season when they drew with Cheltenham Town, allowing Torquay to secure third place, after they beat Southend United.

Mansfield Town faced Northampton Town in their play-off semi-final with the first match of the two-legged tie taking place at Sixfields in Northampton on 16 May 2004. The home side dominated the first half but Mansfield took the lead five minutes before half-time when Rhys Day scored with a header from a Liam Lawrence cross. Midway through the second half, Junior Mendes doubled the lead from close range after the Northampton goalkeeper Lee Harper failed to keep hold of Tom Curtis' shot. In the final minute of the match, Northampton were reduced to ten men when Ashley Westwood was sent off for a foul on Colin Larkin, and the match ended 2–0. The second leg took place four days later at Field Mill in Mansfield. Ten minutes before half-time, Mansfield went ahead after Marc Richards scored with a volley from a Paul Trollope pass. Chris Hargreaves then scored with a header from a Martin Smith free kick to make it 2–0 at half time, levelling the tie on aggregate. Thirty seconds into the second half, Smith made it 3–0 after Trollope capitalised on a misplaced pass from Wayne Corden. Northampton levelled the tie on aggregate when Curtis scored from a rebound. Regular time finished with the aggregate score 3–3 and the game went into extra time, but with no change to the scoreline, a penalty shootout was required to decide the tie. Both sides scored their first three penalties before Northampton's Éric Sabin saw his spotkick saved by Kevin Pilkington, the Mansfield goalkeeper. All the remaining penalties were scored so Mansfield won 5–4 to progress to the final.

Huddersfield Town's opposition for their semi-final were Lincoln City and the first leg was held at Sincil Bank in Lincoln on 15 May 2004. Iffy Onuora put the visiting side ahead after five minutes with a close-range header from a Rob Edwards corner. In the 51st minute, Lincoln equalised: a long throw-in from Kevin Ellison eventually found Simon Yeo whose volley was saved by Paul Rachubka but the rebound was scored by Gary Fletcher. Huddersfield regained the lead through David Mirfin: Andy Holdsworth's corner was headed goalward by Andy Booth and saved by Alan Marriott but the ball fell to Mirfin who scored from a tight angle, ending the match 2–1 to Huddersfield. The second leg was played four days later at the McAlpine Stadium in Huddersfield. Richard Butcher scored in the 38th minute after a defensive mix-up between Rachubka and Efe Sodje to give Lincoln a 1–0 lead before Mark Bailey doubled the lead with a shot from the edge of the Huddersfield penalty area. In the 60th minute, Lincoln's Jamie McCombe fouled Booth to concede a penalty which Danny Schofield converted. Late in the match, Edwards scored from the edge of the Lincoln box to make it 2–2 and give Huddersfield a 4–3 aggregate victory.

== Match ==
=== Background ===
This was Huddersfield's fourth appearance in the play-offs and their second final, having won the 1995 Football League Second Division play-off final 2–1 against Bristol Rovers at Wembley Stadium. They had been relegated to the Third Division the previous season and were aiming for an immediate return. Mansfield were playing in their first play-off final, having been knocked out in the semi-finals on one prior occasion, in 1995. They had also been relegated to the Third Division the preceding season. In the two matches between the sides during the regular season, the first ended in a 3–3 at Field Mill in November 2003 while the return game saw Mansfield win 3–1 at Sixfields the following May. Lawrence was Mansfield's top scorer with 22 goals in the regular season (19 in the league and 3 in the FA Cup) followed by Mendes on 12 (11 in the League and 1 in the FA Cup). Jon Stead, who had joined Blackburn Rovers in January 2004, led the scoring for Huddersfield with 18 goals (16 in the league and 2 in the League Cup) followed by Booth on 14 (13 in the league and 1 in the League Cup).

The referee for the match was Mark Clattenburg. Huddersfield were considered favourites to win the match according to the Racing Post. Mansfield adopted a 4–4–2 formation while Huddersfield played as a 3–5–2.

=== Summary ===
The match kicked off around 3 p.m. on 31 May 2004 at the Millennium Stadium in Cardiff in front of a crowd of 37,298. Six minutes into the game, Booth headed a cross from Anthony Lloyd narrowly wide of the Mansfield goal before Lawrence shot wide. Mansfield's Bobby Hassell also struck the ball wide of the Huddersfield goal. Midway through the first half, the Mansfield goalkeeper Pilkington saved from Schofield. A strike from Lawrence then went high over the Mansfield crossbar before Pawel Abbott's shot from close range was caught by Pilkington. Just before half time, Adam Eaton's shot was wide of the Huddersfield goal.

Neither side made any changes to their personnel during the interval and nine minutes into the second half, Schofield had a chance to score after a jinking run but was tackled by Eaton. As the half progressed, fouls crept into the game with both Eaton and Sodje booked for poor challenges. Booth's header was then saved before Lloyd's mis-hit shot found Schofield whose strike was blocked by Curtis. In the 76th minute Corden's cross from the left wing found substitute Larkin who missed the ball with an attempted header. Booth then sent a chip wide of Mansfield's goal after making a break. Corden's last-minute shot from long range was saved by Rachubka before Larkin's goal was disallowed after Laurent D'Jaffo's cross to him was adjudged to have gone out, and regular time ended goalless, sending the match into extra time.

In the 94th minute, Tony Carss sent a curling shot from around 25 yards (23 m) just wide of the Mansfield goal before both D'Jaffo and Corden missed opportunities to score at the other end of the pitch. With the game still without a goal at the conclusion of the additional period of play, a penalty shootout was required to determine the result. Huddersfield's Edwards took the first penalty and scored before Corden's shot was saved. Schofield then made it 2–0 and Lawrence missed Mansfield's second penalty. Carss converted Huddersfield's third spot kick before Neil MacKenzie scored for Mansfield to make it 3–1. Lee Fowler scored Huddersfield's fourth penalty to secure a 4–1 victory for his side and promotion to the Second Division.

=== Details ===
31 May 2004
15:00 BST

Huddersfield Town	0–0 (a.e.t.)	Mansfield Town
	(Report)
Penalties
Edwards (penalty scored); Schofield (penalty scored); Carss (penalty scored); Fowler (penalty scored)	4–1	(penalty missed) Corden; (penalty missed) Lawrence; (penalty scored) MacKenzie

Millennium Stadium, Cardiff
Attendance: 37,298
Referee: Mark Clattenburg (Durham)

Huddersfield Town	Mansfield Town

GK	29	Paul Rachubka
DF	27	David Mirfin
DF	16	Efe Sodje	(yellow card) 65'
DF	5	Steve Yates
MF	24	Anthony Lloyd	(substituted off) 112'
MF	8	Tony Carss
MF	18	Jon Worthington	(substituted off) 85'
MF	11	Danny Schofield
MF	21	Andy Holdsworth
FW	23	Andy Booth
FW	9	Pawel Abbott	(substituted off) 91'
Substitutes:
GK	13	Phil Senior
DF	3	Rob Edwards	(substituted on) 112'
DF	20	Nat Brown
MF	4	Lee Fowler	(substituted on) 85'
FW	31	John McAliskey	(substituted on) 91'
Manager:
Peter Jackson

GK	1	Kevin Pilkington
DF	12	Bobby Hassell	(yellow card) 90'
DF	5	Rhys Day
DF	15	Alex Baptiste
DF	3	Adam Eaton	(yellow card) 63'
MF	7	Liam Lawrence
MF	4	Tom Curtis
MF	24	Lee Williamson	(substituted off) 98'
MF	11	Wayne Corden
FW	8	Craig Disley	(substituted off) 60'
FW	20	Junior Mendes	(substituted off) 69'
Substitutes:
GK	40	James Coates
DF	25	David Artell
MF	14	Neil MacKenzie	(substituted on) 98'
FW	30	Laurent D'Jaffo	(substituted on) 69'
FW	9	Colin Larkin	(substituted on) 60'
Manager:
Keith Curle

== Post-match ==
Peter Jackson, the Huddersfield manager, reflected on his side's success despite recent financial struggles as a year prior the club had gone into administration: "I'm absolutely thrilled to bits with what we've achieved this year ... Nine months ago, when only eight players turn up, you think you've got a difficult job." He paid tribute to his counterpart, Keith Curle, saying "We are all delighted but we have to feel sorry for Keith Curle and his team because it is a terrible way to lose." Curle was downbeat: "More than cruel. That hurts."

Huddersfield's next season saw them finish in ninth place in Football League One (the renamed Second Division), three positions and one point below the play-offs. Mansfield ended their following season in thirteenth position in Football League Two (the renamed Third Division).
