= 2004–05 Mansfield Town F.C. season =

Mansfield Town
2004–05 season
- Manager: Keith Curle, Carlton Palmer
- Stadium: Field Mill
- Football League Two: 13th
- FA Cup: First round
- League Cup: First round
- Football League Trophy: Second round

During the 2004–05 English football season, Mansfield Town Football Club competed in Football League Two where they finished in 13th position with 60 points.

== Final league table ==
Pos	Team	Pld	W	D	L	GF	GA	GD	Pts
11	Leyton Orient	46	16	15	15	65	67	−2	63
12	Bristol Rovers	46	13	21	12	60	57	+3	60
13	Mansfield Town	46	15	15	16	56	56	0	60
14	Cheltenham Town	46	16	12	18	51	54	−3	60
15	Oxford United	46	16	11	19	50	63	−13	59

Updated to match(es) played on 15 September 2009. Source: 2004–05 League Two
Rules for classification: 1) points; 2) goal difference; 3) number of goals scored.

== Results ==
Mansfield Town's score comes first

=== Legend ===
Win	Draw	Loss

=== Football League Two ===
Match	Date	Opponent	Venue	Result	Attendance	Scorers
1	7 August 2004	Bristol Rovers	H	0–2	5,709	
2	11 August 2004	Oxford United	A	0–1	5,029	
3	14 August 2004	Chester City	A	3–0	2,648	Asamoah, Buxton, Larkin
4	21 August 2004	Kidderminster Harriers	H	2–1	3,859	Larkin (2)
5	28 August 2004	Grimsby Town	A	0–2	5,693	
6	30 August 2004	Yeovil Town	H	4–1	3,826	Asamoah, Larkin, Corden, Artell
7	5 September 2004	Northampton Town	H	4–1	5,173	Asamoah, Larkin, Corden (2)
8	11 September 2004	Cambridge United	A	2–2	3,549	Larkin, MacKenzie
9	18 September 2004	Rochdale	H	1–0	4,266	Larkin
10	25 September 2004	Scunthorpe United	A	1–1	5,463	Artell
11	2 October 2004	Lincoln City	H	2–2	5,349	Murray, Baptiste
12	8 October 2004	Swansea City	A	0–1	8,868	
13	16 October 2004	Notts County	H	3–1	7,682	Day, Larkin, Woodman
14	19 October 2004	Cheltenham Town	A	0–2	2,706	
15	26 October 2004	Wycombe Wanderers	A	1–1	4,215	Asamoah
16	30 October 2004	Bury	H	0–0	4,147	
17	6 November 2004	Macclesfield Town	H	0–1	3,816	
18	20 November 2004	Boston United	A	0–0	3,354	
19	27 November 2004	Leyton Orient	H	0–1	3,803	
20	7 December 2004	Darlington	A	1–2	3,686	Barker
21	11 December 2004	Rushden & Diamonds	H	0–0	3,776	
22	18 December 2004	Shrewsbury Town	H	2–0	3,469	Murray, Asamoah
23	28 December 2004	Southend United	A	1–0	7,082	Warne
24	1 January 2005	Northampton Town	A	1–2	6,112	Rowson (o.g.)
25	3 January 2005	Scunthorpe United	H	1–0	5,315	Murray
26	11 January 2005	Cambridge United	H	0–0	3,557	
27	15 January 2005	Rochdale	A	1–1	2,576	Barker
28	22 January 2005	Southend United	H	1–1	3,894	Murray
29	29 January 2005	Lincoln City	A	0–2	5,511	
30	5 February 2005	Notts County	H	1–0	10,005	Barker
31	8 February 2005	Swansea City	H	1–0	3,829	Barker
32	12 February 2005	Cheltenham Town	A	1–2	3,665	Larkin
33	19 February 2005	Bury	A	2–0	2,595	Murray, Rundle
34	22 February 2005	Wycombe Wanderers	H	1–4	2,497	Barker
35	26 February 2005	Rushden & Diamonds	A	0–0	3,096	
36	5 March 2005	Shrewsbury Town	H	1–1	3,278	Neil
37	12 March 2005	Oxford United	H	1–3	3,030	Larkin
38	19 March 2005	Bristol Rovers	A	4–4	5,294	Larkin, Barker (2), Lloyd
39	25 March 2005	Chester City	H	0–0	3,437	
40	28 March 2005	Kidderminster Harriers	A	3–1	3,237	Barker, Brown
41	2 April 2005	Grimsby Town	H	2–0	3,424	Rundle, Brown
42	9 April 2005	Yeovil Town	A	2–5	6,471	Rundle, Day
43	16 April 2005	Darlington	H	1–1	3,569	Day
44	23 April 2005	Macclesfield Town	A	1–3	2,459	Lloyd
45	30 April 2005	Boston United	H	3–2	3,223	Lloyd, Barker, Rundle
46	7 May 2005	Leyton Orient	A	1–2	3,882	Lloyd

=== FA Cup ===
Round	Date	Opponent	Venue	Result	Attendance	Scorers
R1	13 November 2004	Colchester United	H	1–1	3,202	Baptiste
R1 Replay	23 November 2004	Colchester United	A	1–4	2,492	Neil

=== League Cup ===
Round	Date	Opponent	Venue	Result	Attendance	Scorers
R1	21 September 2004	Preston North End	H	0–4	3,208	

=== Football League Trophy ===
Round	Date	Opponent	Venue	Result	Attendance	Scorers
R1	28 September 2004	Darlington	H	0–0 (4–3 pens)	1,651	
R2	2 November 2004	Macclesfield Town	A	0–4	1,027	

== Squad statistics ==
No.	Pos.	Name	League		FA Cup		League Cup		League Trophy		Total	
No.	Pos.	Name	Apps	Goals	Apps	Goals	Apps	Goals	Apps	Goals	Apps	Goals
1	GK	(England) Kevin Pilkington	42	0	2	0	1	0	1	0	46	0
2	DF	(Scotland) Scott McNiven	24(1)	0	0	0	0	0	1	0	25(1)	0
3	DF	(England) Adam Eaton	2	0	0	0	0	0	0	0	2	0
4	DF	(England) Tom Curtis	26(6)	0	2	0	1	0	0	0	29(6)	0
5	DF	(Wales) Rhys Day	11(7)	3	0(1)	0	1	0	1	0	13(8)	3
6	MF	(England) Adam Rundle	18	4	0	0	0	0	0	0	18	4
6	DF	(England) Craig Woodman	8	1	0	0	0	0	1	0	9	1
6	DF	(England) Jason Talbot	2	0	0	0	0	0	0	0	2	0
7	MF	(Scotland) Alex Neil	40(1)	1	1	1	1	0	0	0	42(1)	2
8	MF	(England) Adam Murray	27(5)	5	1(1)	0	1	0	2	0	31(6)	5
9	FW	(Republic of Ireland) Colin Larkin	29(4)	11	1	0	0	0	2	0	32(4)	11
10	FW	(Ghana) Derek Asamoah	24(6)	5	2	0	1	0	0(1)	0	27(7)	5
11	MF	(England) Giles Coke	7(2)	0	0	0	0	0	0	0	7(2)	0
11	MF	(England) Wayne Corden	19(5)	3	1	0	1	0	1	0	22(5)	3
12	MF	(England) Simon Brown	16(5)	2	0	0	0	0	0	0	16(5)	2
13	GK	(England) Jason White	4	0	0	0	0	0	1	0	5	0
14	MF	(England) Neil MacKenzie	9(6)	1	2	0	1	0	2	0	14(6)	1
14	FW	(Scotland) Andrew Barrowman	1(2)	0	0	0	0	0	0	0	1(2)	0
15	DF	(England) Alex John-Baptiste	41	1	2	1	1	0	1(1)	0	44(1)	2
16	DF	(England) Jake Buxton	29(1)	1	2	0	0	0	1	0	32(1)	1
17	DF	(England) Chris Wood	0(1)	0	0(1)	0	0	0	0	0	0(2)	0
17	FW	(England) Chris Tate	0(4)	0	0	0	0(1)	0	0	0	0(5)	0
18	FW	(England) Joe O'Neill	3(12)	0	0	0	0	0	2	0	5(12)	0
18	FW	(England) Paul Warne	7	1	0	0	0	0	0	0	7	1
18	FW	(England) Goma Lambu	1	0	0	0	0	0	0	0	1	0
19	DF	(England) Austin McIntosh	1	0	0(1)	0	0	0	0	0	1(1)	0
20	MF	(England) Tom Curle	0	0	0	0	0	0	2	0	2	0
21	DF	(Malta) Luke Dimech	19(6)	0	2	0	1	0	2	0	24(6)	0
22	MF	(England) Callum Lloyd	7(3)	4	1	0	0	0	2	0	10(3)	4
23	MF	(England) Dean Hankey	0	0	0	0	0	0	0	0	0	0
23	FW	(Wales) Leyton Maxwell	1	0	0	0	0	0	0	0	1	0
24	MF	(England) Danny Heron	1(2)	0	0(1)	0	0(1)	0	0	0	1(4)	0
24	MF	(England) Lee Williamson	3(1)	0	0	0	0	0	0	0	3(1)	0
25	DF	(England) David Artell	19	2	2	0	1	0	1	0	23	2
26	MF	(England) Fraser McLachlan	16(5)	0	1	0	0	0	0	0	17(5)	0
26	FW	(Cameroon) Guy Ipoua	4(1)	0	0	0	0	0	0	0	4(1)	0
27	MF	(England) Richard Lonsdale	0	0	0	0	0	0	0(1)	0	0(1)	0
29	FW	(England) Richie Barker	28	10	0	0	0	0	0	0	28	10
31	MF	(Wales) Gareth Jelleyman	14	0	0	0	0	0	0	0	14	0
31	FW	(England) Joel Kitamirike	2	0	0	0	0	0	0	0	2	0
32	FW	(New Zealand) Shane Smeltz	1(4)	0	0	0	0	0	0	0	1(4)	0
–	–	Own goals	–	1	–	0	–	0	–	0	–	1
