= 2005–06 Chester City F.C. season =

Chester City
2005–06 season
- Manager: Keith Curle; Mark Wright
- Stadium: Deva Stadium
- Football League Two: 15th
- FA Cup: Round 3
- Football League Cup: Round 1
- Football League Trophy: Round 1
- Top goalscorer: League: Ryan Lowe (10); All: Ryan Lowe (13)
- Highest home attendance: 4,801 vs Wrexham (12 April)
- Lowest home attendance: 1,806 vs Torquay United (7 March)
- Average home league attendance: 2,964; 18th in division

The 2005–06 season was the 64th season of competitive association football in the Football League played by Chester City, an English club based in Chester, Cheshire.

Also, it was the second season spent in the Football League Two, after the promotion from the Football Conference in 2004. Alongside competing in the Football League the club also participated in the FA Cup, the Football League Cup and the Football League Trophy.

== Football League ==
Pos	Team	Pld	W	D	L	GF	GA	GD	Pts
13	Wrexham	46	15	14	17	61	54	+7	59
14	Rochdale	46	14	14	18	66	69	−3	56
15	Chester City	46	14	12	20	53	59	−6	54
16	Mansfield Town	46	13	15	18	59	66	−7	54
17	Macclesfield Town	46	12	18	16	60	71	−11	54

Rules for classification: In the Football League goals scored (GF) takes precedence over goal difference (GD).

=== Results summary ===
Overall								Home						Away					
Pld	W	D	L	GF	GA	GD	Pts	W	D	L	GF	GA	GD	W	D	L	GF	GA	GD
46	14	12	20	53	59	−6	54	7	6	10	30	29	+1	7	6	10	23	30	−7

Source: rsssf.com

=== Results by matchday ===
Round	1	2	3	4	5	6	7	8	9	10	11	12	13	14	15	16	17	18	19	20	21	22	23	24	25	26	27	28	29	30	31	32	33	34	35	36	37	38	39	40	41	42	43	44	45	46
Result	W	D	D	D	W	W	L	D	W	D	W	D	L	W	D	L	D	D	W	W	L	L	L	L	L	L	L	W	L	L	L	L	L	D	L	L	L	W	W	W	W	W	D	D	L	L
Position	4	5	10	11	9	2	4	5	4	4	3	4	5	5	5	5	6	6	5	2	5	6	8	8	12	17	17	14	15	17	17	19	19	19	21	24	24	22	20	18	15	15	14	14	16	15

Source: 11v11.com
W = Win; D = Draw; L = Loss

=== Matches ===
Date	Opponents	Venue	Result	Score	Scorers	Attendance
6 August	Peterborough United	A	W	1–0	Drummond	4,980
9 August	Lincoln City	H	D	2–2	Davies, Branch (pen)	2,637
20 August	Rushden & Diamonds	A	D	1–1	Lowe	2,682
27 August	Darlington	H	D	4–4	Richardson (2), Blundell (2)	2,469
29 August	Torquay United	A	W	1–0	Lowe	2,245
2 September	Mansfield Town	H	W	3–1	Blundell (2), Lowe	3,079
6 September	Grimsby Town	H	L	1–2	Lowe	3,095
10 September	Notts County	A	D	1–1	Davies	5,404
17 September	Bristol Rovers	H	W	4–0	Lowe, Artell, Richardson, Blundell	2,874
24 September	Stockport County	A	D	0–0		4,873
27 September	Carlisle United	H	W	2–0	Artell, Blundell	3,394
1 October	Wycombe Wanderers	A	D	3–3	Drummond, Branch (2)	5,145
7 October	Rochdale	H	L	2–3	Drummond, Davies	4,327
15 October	Barnet	A	W	3–1	Branch, Lowe, Curtis	2,206
22 October	Bury	H	D	1–1	Lowe (pen)	3,471
29 October	Shrewsbury Town	A	L	1–3	Lowe	5,430
12 November	Northampton Town	H	D	0–0		3,295
19 November	Rochdale	A	D	2–2	Bolland, Davies	3,618
26 November	Peterborough United	H	W	3–1	Branch (pen), Drummond, Lowe	2,701
6 December	Leyton Orient	A	W	1–0	Drummond	3,463
10 December	Lincoln City	A	L	1–3	Richardson	3,563
17 December	Rushden & Diamonds	H	L	1–2	Davies (pen)	2,265
26 December	Cheltenham Town	A	L	0–1		3,819
31 December	Macclesfield Town	A	L	0–1		2,910
2 January	Oxford United	H	L	0–1		2,624
14 January	Boston United	H	L	0–1		2,956
21 January	Bristol Rovers	A	L	1–2	Davies	6,310
24 January	Mansfield Town	A	W	2–1	McNiven, Asamoah	3,219
28 January	Notts County	H	L	0–2		2,599
4 February	Carlisle United	A	L	0–5		6,561
11 February	Stockport County	H	L	1–2	Lowe	3,446
18 February	Leyton Orient	H	L	0–2		2,210
25 February	Grimsby Town	A	L	0–1		4,058
7 March	Torquay United	H	D	1–1	Blundell	1,806
11 March	Darlington	A	L	0–1		3,593
18 March	Cheltenham Town	H	L	0–1		2,281
26 March	Wrexham	A	L	1–2	Edwards	7,240
29 March	Boston United	A	W	3–1	Asamoah (3)	1,651
1 April	Macclesfield Town	H	W	2–1	Asamoah (2)	2,939
8 April	Oxford United	A	W	1–0	Asamoah	5,754
12 April	Wrexham	H	W	2–1	Davies (pen), Asamoah	4,801
15 April	Wycombe Wanderers	H	W	1–0	Drummond	2,797
17 April	Bury	A	D	0–0		3,421
22 April	Barnet	H	D	0–0		2,367
29 April	Northampton Town	A	L	0–1		7,114
6 May	Shrewsbury Town	H	L	0–1		3,744

== FA Cup ==
Round	Date	Opponents	Venue	Result	Score	Scorers	Attendance
First round	5 November	Folkestone Invicta (7)	H	W	2–1	Branch (pen), Lowe	2,503
Second round	3 December	Nottingham Forest (3)	H	W	3–0	Lowe (2, 1 pen), Richardson	4,732
Third round	7 January	Cheltenham Town (4)	A	D	2–2	Richardson, Drummond	4,741
Third round replay	17 January	Cheltenham Town (4)	H	L	0–1		5,096

== League Cup ==
Round	Date	Opponents	Venue	Result	Score	Scorers	Attendance
First round	23 August	Wolverhampton Wanderers (2)	A	L	1–5	Davies	9,518

== Football League Trophy ==
Round	Date	Opponents	Venue	Result	Score	Scorers	Attendance
First round	18 October	Cambridge United (5)	A	L	0–3		1,224

== Season statistics ==
Nat	Player	Total		League		FA Cup		League Cup		FL Trophy	
Nat	Player	A	G	A	G	A	G	A	G	A	G
Goalkeepers
(England)	Ryan Brookfield	0+1	–	0+1	–	–	–	–	–	–	–
(Luxembourg)	Stéphane Gillet	10	–	8	–	2	–	–	–	–	–
(England)	Paul Harrison	4	–	4	–	–	–	–	–	–	–
(England)	Chris Mackenzie	34	–	30	–	2	–	1	–	1	–
(England)	John Ruddy	4	–	4	–	–	–	–	–	–	–
Field players
(England)	Mark Albrighton	9	–	9	–	–	–	–	–	–	–
(England)	David Artell	38+3	2	34+3	2	4	–	–	–	–	–
(Ghana)	Derek Asamoah	14+3	8	14+3	8	–	–	–	–	–	–
(New Zealand)	Leo Bertos	3+4	–	2+3	–	–	–	0+1	–	1	–
(England)	Gregg Blundell	25+8	7	23+7	7	2	–	0+1	–	–	–
(England)	Phil Bolland	14+5	1	12+4	1	0+1	–	1	–	1	–
(England)	Michael Branch	26+4	6	23+4	5	2	1	1	–	–	–
(England)	Wayne Corden	2	–	2	–	–	–	–	–	–	–
(England)	Tom Curle	1+2	–	0+2	–	–	–	–	–	1	–
(England)	Tom Curtis	39+6	1	34+6	1	4	–	1	–	–	–
(England)	Ben Davies	47+4	8	42+3	7	4	–	1	1	0+1	–
(Malta)	Luke Dimech	32+3	–	27+3	–	4	–	1	–	–	–
(England)	Craig Dove	3+4	–	2+3	–	–	–	0+1	–	1	–
(England)	Stewart Drummond	46+1	7	41+1	6	4	1	1	–	–	–
(England)	Jake Edwards	10	1	10	1	–	–	–	–	–	–
(France)	Abdou El-Kholti	8+19	–	7+15	–	0+4	–	–	–	1	–
(England)	Paul Ellender	5	–	5	–	–	–	–	–	–	–
(England)	Sean Hessey	19+2	–	17+2	–	–	–	1	–	1	–
(England)	Evan Horwood	1	–	1	–	–	–	–	–	–	–
(England)	Ryan Lowe	30+4	13	28+4	10	2	3	–	–	–	–
(Scotland)	Scott McNiven	46+1	1	41	1	4	–	1	–	0+1	–
(England)	Carl Regan	44+2	–	39+2	–	4	–	1	–	–	–
(England)	Marcus Richardson	26+13	6	22+12	4	3+1	2	–	–	1	–
(England)	Mark Roberts	1	–	1	–	–	–	–	–	–	–
(Scotland)	Chris Robertson	0+1	–	0+1	–	–	–	–	–	–	–
(England)	Paul Rutherford	2+5	–	1+5	–	–	–	–	–	1	–
(England)	Paul Tait	3+6	–	3+6	–	–	–	–	–	–	–
(England)	Stephen Vaughan	8+14	–	7+10	–	0+3	–	0+1	–	1	–
(England)	Justin Walker	18+8	–	13+8	–	3	–	1	–	1	–
	Total	52	61	46	53	4	7	1	1	1	–
