= Craig Mitchell =

Craig Mitchell may refer to:

- Craig Mitchell (baseball) (born 1954), former Major League Baseball pitcher
- Craig Mitchell (rugby player) (born 1986), Wales international rugby union player
- Craig Mitchell (footballer) (born 1985), English footballer
