= Neil MacKenzie =

English footballer

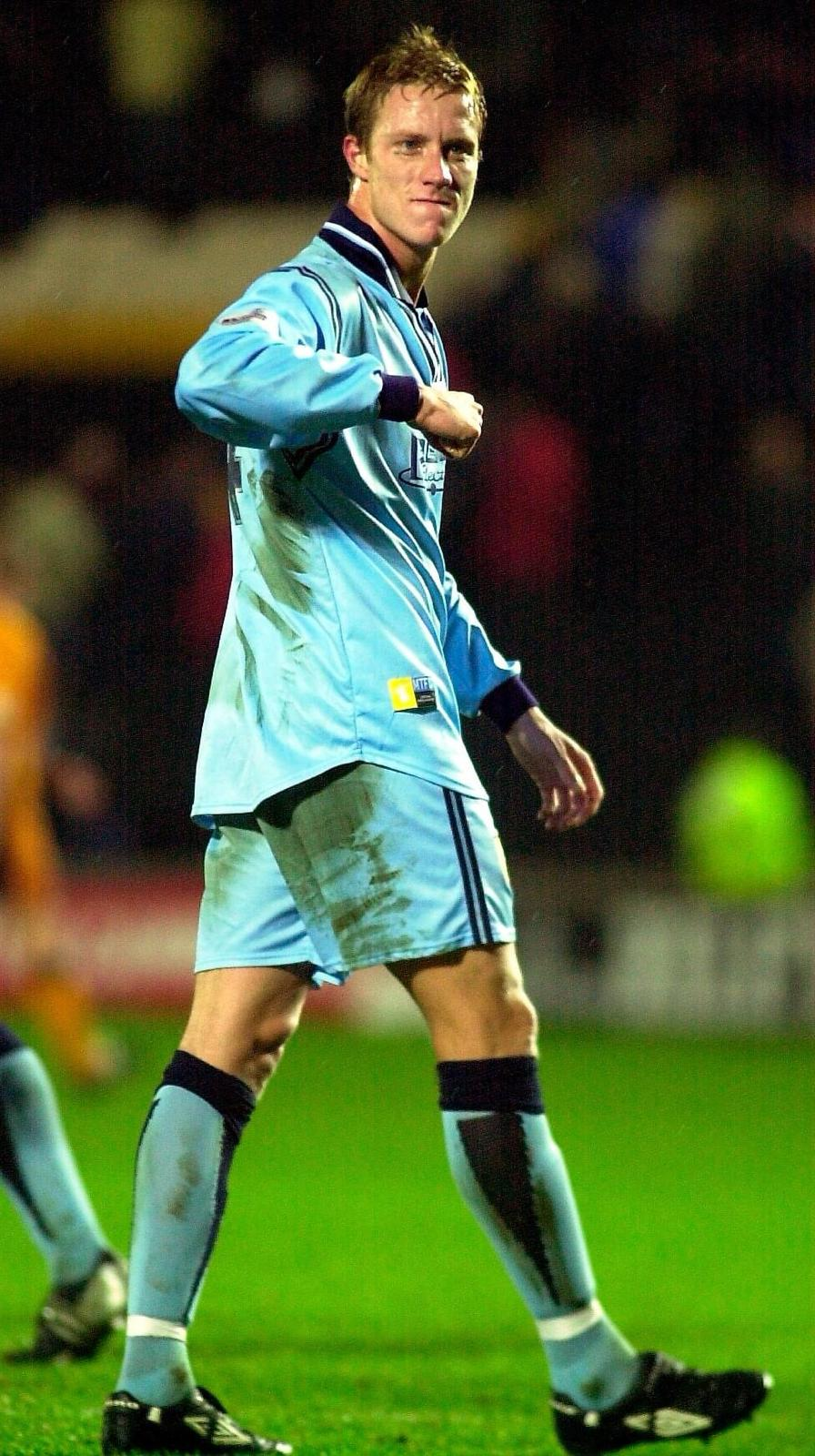
- Neil Mackenzie scoring a goal during a match

Personal information
- Full name: Neil David MacKenzie
- Date of birth: 15 April 1976 (age 50)
- Place of birth: Birmingham, England
- Height: 1.88 m (6 ft 2 in)
- Position: Midfielder

Youth career
- Stoke City

Senior career*
Years	Team	Apps	(Gls)
1996–1999	Stoke City	42	(1)
1999	→ Cambridge United (loan)	4	(1)
1999–2000	Cambridge United	28	(0)
2000–2001	Kidderminster Harriers	23	(3)
2001–2002	Blackpool	14	(1)
2002–2004	Mansfield Town	74	(4)
2004–2005	Macclesfield Town	24	(1)
2005–2007	Scunthorpe United	38	(4)
2006	→ Hereford United (loan)	7	(0)
2007–2009	Notts County	30	(6)
2008	→ Kidderminster Harriers (loan)	4	(1)
2008–2009	→ Port Vale (loan)	2	(0)
2009	Mansfield Town	7	(0)
2009–2011	Tamworth	53	(1)
2011	St Neots Town	12	(0)
2011–2013	Evesham United	19	(1)
2013–2015	Halesowen Town	46	(6)
2015	Hinckley AFC	0	(0)
Total		427	(30)
- * Club domestic league appearances and goals

Neil David MacKenzie (born 15 April 1976) is an English former footballer who played as a midfielder. He scored 36 goals in 480 league and cup appearances across a 19-year career.

Starting his career at Stoke City in 1996, after three years, he moved on to Cambridge United, following a short loan period. After this, he spent a season with Kidderminster Harriers, then another season with Blackpool, before signing with Mansfield Town in 2002. After two years, he transferred to Scunthorpe United, where he was loaned out to Hereford United, before signing with Notts County in 2007. County loaned him back to both former club Kidderminster and Port Vale in 2008 before he joined Tamworth in 2009 via another old club, Mansfield Town. In 2011, he switched to Evesham United via St Neots Town. He joined Halesowen Town in 2013 and helped the club to the Northern Premier League Division One South title in 2013–14, then moved on to Hinckley AFC in July 2015.

== Career ==
=== Stoke City ===
MacKenzie began his career at Stoke City, signing as a trainee in 1996. He made his senior debut in a First Division clash with Portsmouth on 26 October 1996, replacing Kevin Keen in stoppage time. He won his first senior start on 29 January 1997, playing in a 2–1 home defeat to Bolton Wanderers. Ten days later, he scored his first competitive goal, bagging the opening goal of a 2–1 win over Oxford United at the Victoria Ground. In all he played 23 games in his maiden season for the club. He played 14 games in the 1997–98 relegation season, including a heavy 7–0 defeat at home to Birmingham City on 10 January. He played just six Second Division games in 1998–99.

=== Cambridge United ===
Neil was loaned out in March of that year to Cambridge. Playing in four games and scoring one goal, he played a small part in the club's Third Division promotion campaign. He had impressed so much on his loan spell that Cambridge purchased him from the "Potters" for a £40,000 fee at the beginning of the 1999–2000 campaign. He made 27 appearances for the "U's" that season.

=== Kidderminster Harriers ===
Cambridge sacked him due to "persistent misconduct" in November 2000; this followed an incident at the club's sporting dinner which left him facing a public order offence in court. Following this he dropped back into the basement division to sign for Kidderminster Harriers. He played 23 league games in what was the "Harriers" first season of the league football.

=== Blackpool ===
In summer 2001, he was snapped up by Blackpool. Playing back in the third tier, he made twenty appearances throughout the 2001–02 campaign.

=== Mansfield Town ===
In August 2002, he transferred to Mansfield Town, and made 27 appearances in 2002–03. The following season he hit 38 games, also scoring five goals. This included a hat-trick against Bishop's Stortford in the FA Cup on 8 November. In February 2004, he went underwent surgery on his knee to repair cartilage damage. He returned to action in time to be an extra time substitute for Lee Williamson in the club's play-off final defeat to Huddersfield Town. Huddersfield were promoted following their 4–1 penalty shoot-out success, as MacKenzie was the only "Stags" player to score his penalty. He was offered a new one-year contract at the end of the season.

=== Macclesfield Town ===
Brian Horton brought MacKenzie to Macclesfield Town on loan in November 2004, before signing him for a nominal sum in January 2005. He played 18 games for both Macclesfield and Macclesfield in 2004–05.

=== Scunthorpe United ===
In November 2005, MacKenzie signed for Brian Laws' Scunthorpe United, after impressing whilst on loan from Macclesfield. This came a month after being placed on the transfer-list at Macclesfield. Initially struggling to make his mark on the first-team, he was then struck down with ankle ligament damage in April. During the 2006–07 campaign he found first-team opportunities limited, and was loaned to Hereford United in October. After impressing, he was due to stay with the "Bulls" until the New Year but was recalled to Glanford Park in mid-December following an injury crisis at the club.

=== Notts County ===
He was released by Scunthorpe at the end of the club's League One winning season, and subsequently signed a two-year contract with League Two side Notts County in May 2007. He impressed manager Steve Thompson on his debut three months later. In November that year he was taken to Munich to have a hernia operation. His recovery enabled him to play 32 games in 2007–08.

On 26 September 2008, he joined former club Kidderminster Harriers on a one-month loan. During his stay he scored one goal in four appearances. He joined Port Vale on a one-month loan on 27 November, hopeful of a permanent move later on. However, in January 2009 he was recalled by County, having played just two games with the "Valiants". His contract was terminated by County on 19 January, after he failed to hold down a first-team spot.

=== Non-League ===
Facing a possible move to Burton Albion, he instead rejoined former club Mansfield Town on non-contract terms. He went on to play seven games before departing before the end of the season.

In June 2009, he moved on to Conference National club Tamworth, where he established himself as one of the fittest players at the club, despite his age. He made 27 league appearances in 2009–10, helping the "Lambs" to secure their status in the top-flight of English non-League football. Playing 25 games of the 2010–11 campaign, he left Tamworth in March 2011, only to return to the club the following month, to help out caretaker manager Dale Belford. He made an appearance for the club as a second-half substitute in a 4–2 defeat at Wrexham. Five days later he played a cameo role in the club's vital 2–1 win over Forest Green Rovers in the last game of the season. The match was a relegation dogfight and could have sent either club down; however, the result meant that both clubs survived, with Southport instead facing the drop (Southport were later reprieved following the expulsion of Rushden & Diamonds).

In July 2011, he signed with St Neots Town of the Southern League's Division One Central. However, in December 2011, he decided to take a short break from football, before deciding on his future. He then joined Evesham United of the Southern League. The club suffered relegation from the Premier Division in 2011–12. The "Robins" posted a 14th-place finish in the Division One South & West in the 2012–13 campaign. He joined Halesowen Town of the Northern Premier League Division One South in the 2013–14 season. He helped the "Yeltz" to win promotion as the divisional champions. He made 17 appearances in the 2014–15 season. In July 2015, Mackenzie signed for Hinckley AFC.

== Personal life ==
Mackenzie made history by becoming the first professional footballer to be a contestant on the Channel 4 show Countdown. His debut was broadcast on 30 June 2008, which he won by 71–61 on a crucial Conundrum. He won four further matches, and appeared on course to become an 'Octochamp' (winning the maximum of eight heats) before losing on his sixth appearance. He appeared in the series quarter-finals on 8 December but lost to the eventual winner Junaid Mubeen and was therefore eliminated. He won a crystal vase for his efforts.

Tamworth teammate Bradley Pritchard described veteran MacKenzie as acting the "youngest out of all of us" and as being "by far the funniest person I've been out with".

== Career statistics ==
Appearances and goals by club, season and competition
Club	Season	League			FA Cup		League Cup		Other		Total	
Club	Season	Division	Apps	Goals	Apps	Goals	Apps	Goals	Apps	Goals	Apps	Goals
Stoke City	1996–97	First Division	22	1	1	0	0	0	—		23	1
Stoke City	1997–98	First Division	12	0	0	0	2	0	—		14	0
Stoke City	1998–99	Second Division	6	0	0	0	0	0	1	0	7	0
Stoke City	1999–00	Second Division	2	0	0	0	0	0	0	0	2	0
Stoke City	Total		42	1	1	0	2	0	1	0	46	1
Cambridge United	1998–99	Third Division	4	1	—		—		—		4	1
Cambridge United	1999–00	Second Division	22	0	5	0	0	0	0	0	27	0
Cambridge United	2000–01	Second Division	6	0	1	0	2	0	0	0	9	0
Cambridge United	Total		32	1	6	0	2	0	0	0	40	1
Kidderminster Harriers	2000–01	Third Division	23	3	1	0	0	0	0	0	24	3
Blackpool	2001–02	Second Division	14	1	4	1	2	0	0	0	20	4
Mansfield Town	2002–03	Third Division	24	1	2	0	1	0	0	0	27	1
Mansfield Town	2003–04	Third Division	35	2	2	3	1	0	0	0	38	5
Mansfield Town	2004–05	League Two	15	1	2	0	1	0	0	0	18	1
Mansfield Town	Total		74	4	6	3	3	0	0	0	83	7
Macclesfield Town	2004–05	League Two	18	0	0	0	0	0	0	0	18	0
Macclesfield Town	2005–06	League Two	6	1	0	0	1	1	0	0	7	2
Macclesfield Town	Total		24	1	0	0	1	1	0	0	25	2
Scunthorpe United	2005–06	League One	14	2	2	0	0	0	0	0	16	2
Scunthorpe United	2006–07	League One	24	2	0	0	0	0	0	0	24	2
Scunthorpe United	Total		38	4	2	0	0	0	0	0	40	4
Hereford United (loan)	2006–07	League Two	7	0	0	0	—		—		7	0
Notts County	2007–08	League Two	29	6	2	0	1	0	0	0	32	6
Notts County	2008–09	League Two	1	0	0	0	2	0	0	0	3	0
Notts County	Total		30	6	2	0	3	0	0	0	35	6
Kidderminster Harriers (loan)	2008–09	Conference National	4	1	0	0	—		0	0	4	1
Port Vale (loan)	2008–09	League Two	2	0	1	0	—		—		3	0
Mansfield Town	2008–09	Conference National	7	0	0	0	—		0	0	7	0
Tamworth	2009–10	Conference National	27	0	0	0	—		0	0	27	0
Tamworth	2010–11	Conference National	26	1	1	0	—		0	0	27	1
Tamworth	Total		53	1	1	0	0	0	0	0	54	1
St Neots Town	2011–12	Southern Div. 1 Central	12	0	1	0	—		3	0	16	0
Evesham United	2011–12	Southern Premier	8	1	0	0	—		0	0	8	1
Evesham United	2012–13	Southern Div. 1 South & West	11	0	0	0	—		2	0	13	0
Evesham United	Total		19	1	0	0	0	0	2	0	21	1
Halesowen Town	2013–14	Northern Div. 1 South	33	4	3	1	—		2	0	38	5
Halesowen Town	2014–15	Northern Premier League	13	2	1	0	—		3	0	17	2
Halesowen Town	Total		46	6	4	1	0	0	5	0	55	7
Career total			427	30	29	5	13	1	11	0	480	36

== Honours ==
Cambridge United

- Football League Third Division second-place promotion: 1998–99

Scunthorpe United

- Football League One: 2006–07

Halesowen Town

- Northern Premier League Division One South: 2013–14
