= Kevin Pilkington =

English footballer and coach (born 1974)

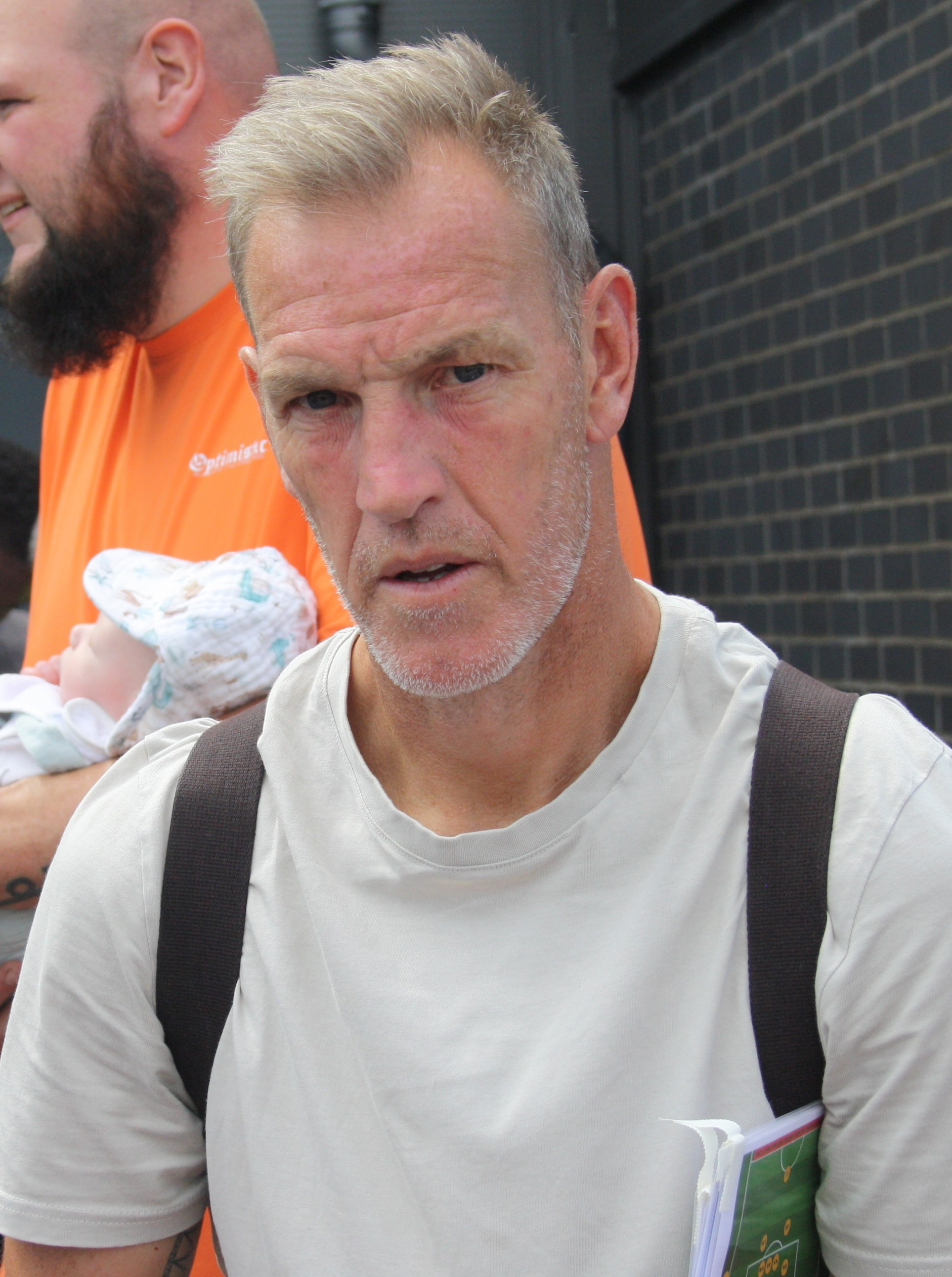
- Pilkington in 2026

Personal information
- Full name: Kevin William Pilkington
- Date of birth: 8 March 1974 (age 52)
- Place of birth: Hitchin, England
- Height: 6 ft 1 in (1.85 m)
- Position: Goalkeeper

Team information
- Current team: Luton Town (goalkeeping coach)

Youth career
- Harrowby United
- 1990–1992: Manchester United

Senior career*
Years	Team	Apps	(Gls)
1992–1998	Manchester United	6	(0)
1996	→ Rochdale (loan)	6	(0)
1997	→ Rotherham United (loan)	17	(0)
1998	→ Celtic (loan)	0	(0)
1998–2000	Port Vale	23	(0)
2000	Aberystwyth Town	1	(0)
2000	Wigan Athletic	0	(0)
2000–2005	Mansfield Town	170	(0)
2005–2010	Notts County	141	(0)
2009–2010	→ Luton Town (loan)	8	(0)
2010–2012	Luton Town	15	(0)
2010–2011	→ Mansfield Town (loan)	10	(0)
2012–2017	Notts County	3	(0)
2018–2019	Cambridge United	0	(0)
Total		400	(0)
- * Club domestic league appearances and goals

Kevin William Pilkington (born 8 March 1974) is an English football coach and former professional footballer who is the goalkeeping coach at EFL League One club Luton Town.

As a player, he had a 25-year career as a goalkeeper, playing 439 league and cup games. Noted for his shot stopping abilities, Pilkington notably played in the Premier League for Manchester United before dropping down to the English Football League, where he played in nearly 350 games in his time at Mansfield Town and Notts County, helping Mansfield win promotion out of the Third Division in 2001–02. He spent five years with Mansfield and then another ten years over two spells with Notts County; at both clubs, he was usually the first-choice keeper rather than a backup keeper as he was at most other clubs. He has also represented Rochdale, Rotherham United, Celtic, Port Vale, Aberystwyth Town, Wigan Athletic and Luton Town.

Following his retirement, Pilkington moved into coaching and has worked as a goalkeeping coach for Ilkeston, Notts County, Luton Town, and Cambridge United. During the 2018–19 season, he briefly came out of retirement to act as a backup keeper for Cambridge.

== Playing career ==
=== Manchester United ===
Pilkington started his footballing career at Manchester United, signing after he was scouted playing non-League football for Harrowby United. He featured in their FA Youth Cup triumph in 1992, after which he signed a professional contract. He found himself to be the third choice behind Peter Schmeichel and one of Gary Walsh, Tony Coton or Raimond van der Gouw. Although he was selected as an unused substitute in their two goalless draws with Russian side Torpedo Moscow in the 1992–93 UEFA Cup, he did not play a first-team game until 16 November 1994, when he appeared as a substitute for the injured Peter Schmeichel in a 3–0 win over Crystal Palace in the Premier League on 16 November 1994. However, manager Alex Ferguson decided to select Walsh as goalkeeper for the 10 league games in which Schmeichel was absent, meaning that Pilkington was on the substitutes bench in each of these games, and back in the reserve team once Schmeichel returned to fitness and Walsh returned to the bench. Pilkington won the Denzil Haroun Reserve Team Player of the Year award for the 1994–95 season.

Walsh was sold to Middlesbrough just before the start of the 1995–96 season, enabling Pilkington to become United's second-choice goalkeeper. Pilkington made the first competitive start of his career in one of the most embarrassing games of United's modern history on 20 September 1995, when as the Premier League's second-placed team, they were beaten 3–0 at home by Second Division strugglers York City. His first league start came on 2 December 1995, when United drew 1–1 with Chelsea, Dennis Wise getting the better of Pilkington in the game at Old Trafford. He played two more league games that season.

In February 1996, he joined Division Three side Rochdale on a six-week loan, as the arrival of Coton had reduced him to third-choice goalkeeper after six months as second-choice. Coton left for Sunderland just before the start of the 1996–97 season. Still, Pilkington's hopes of becoming second-choice goalkeeper again were ended by the arrival of 33-year-old Dutchman Van der Gouw. He played no part in United's 1996–97 season, instead joining Rotherham United on a three-month loan in January 1997. He played 17 games for the Second Division club, keeping just two clean sheets in a sub-par team that finished the season 17 points adrift of safety from relegation. Pilkington played two games of United's disappointing 1997–98 campaign. On Boxing Day, he kept goal in a 2–0 defeat of Everton at Old Trafford, though two days later he conceded three at Highfield Road – Coventry City winning 3–2. He spent two months on loan with Scottish Premier League giants Celtic in the run-up to their 1998 title triumph, but he failed to make the field.

=== Port Vale ===
He signed with Port Vale on a free transfer in June 1998. Unable to dislodge the veteran Paul Musselwhite in the 1998–99 season, a young Pilkington played nine Division One games in mid-season, Vale losing all but two of them. Again forced to play second fiddle in 1999–2000, he played in 16 games, keeping three clean sheets. He was at Vale Park for the end of an era – following John Rudge's dismissal, he was first-choice keeper under Brian Horton from March onwards but was released at the end of the season.

=== Mansfield Town ===
Following a brief spell with Welsh Premier League side Aberystwyth Town, Pilkington joined Second Division side Wigan Athletic in early September 2000. After six days, he dropped to Mansfield Town in the fourth tier. He played just three games for the "Stags" that season, before summer signing Michael Bingham from Blackburn Rovers was recruited as competition for the number 1 jersey. Promoted to first choice keeper in 2001–02, he played almost fifty games as the club achieved promotion in third place. Early in the season, Pilkington conceded a goal in bizarre circumstances during a League Cup first round defeat to Notts County. Opposition keeper Steve Mildenhall put a free kick into Pilkington's net from inside of his own half of the field. In a first half to forget, County's Danny Allsopp also scored a 31st-minute hat-trick.

After recovering from a broken wrist in September, he played 36 games the next season, as Mansfield came straight back down. Pilkington played 55 competitive games in 2003–04. He kept a clean sheet in the 2004 play-off final, though Huddersfield Town won 4–1 on penalties. In 2004–05, Pilkington was busy once again, keeping goal on 46 occasions. At the end of the campaign, he was out of contract. Offered a one-year deal, manager Carlton Palmer was confident of his signature. However, with the new deal paying less than his previous contract, he rejected the offer, despite Palmer being "95% sure" Pilkington would sign. Pilkington instead signed with League Two rivals Notts County in June 2005.

=== Notts County ===
In his first season at Meadow Lane, he played 48 games. In a difficult season, the experienced keeper helped the "Magpies" defence to compensate for their woeful scoring record. A clean sheet kept against Oxford United on 18 March proved vital as Oxford finished 23rd, three points behind County. Had Pilkington conceded a goal that day, it would have eventually been Notts County, which would have lost its Football League status for the first time in the league's history. He dislocated a shoulder in April, which caused him to miss the season's last games.

Notts County were a lot more comfortable the following season, Pilkington making 40 appearances, all but one of them in the league. Boss Steve Thompson had some explaining to do when he dropped Pilkington in favour of Saul Deeney for a brief period in December. In 2007–08 the club again narrowly avoided relegation into the Conference, as County finished six points ahead of Pilkington's former club Mansfield Town in 23rd place. He played 35 games and said he was in the best form of his life, when in mid-February he suffered a fractured leg. At the end of the season he signed a new two-year contract, and was voted both the Fans' Player of the Year and Players' Player of the Year.

He started the 2008–09 season as second-choice keeper behind Russell Hoult. Following an injury to Hoult, Pilkington made 26 appearances as his club struggled yet again. The ten points that Notts County finished above 23rd-place Chester City concealed the fact that, without point deductions for other teams, the "Magpies" would once again have finished six points above the relegation zone. After a takeover at County in the summer of 2009, Pilkington found himself out in the cold as third-choice goalkeeper behind new signing Kasper Schmeichel and, once again, Russell Hoult. On 12 November 2009, he signed on a one-month loan for Conference Premier side Luton Town, later extended for a further month on 17 December, acting as cover for the injured Mark Tyler. He returned to Notts County after suffering an injury of his own in a 3–2 loss to Ebbsfleet United on 30 January 2010. On 10 May 2010, it was announced that he had been released by Notts County along with seven other players.

=== Luton Town ===
Ten days later, Pilkington signed a permanent one-year contract for his previous loan club, Luton Town. He made two starts at the beginning of the 2010–11 season, before losing his place in the team to Mark Tyler. Pilkington joined former club Mansfield Town on a three-month loan on 28 October 2010. He returned to Luton on 28 January 2011 having made 11 appearances in all competitions for Mansfield. At the end of the season, Pilkington signed a one-year contract extension to stay at Luton until June 2012.

== Coaching career ==
On 16 September 2011, Pilkington was appointed goalkeeper coach of Northern Premier League Division One South side Ilkeston. He carried out the role in addition to his playing duties with Luton. On 20 February 2012, Pilkington was appointed goalkeeping coach of Notts County. He was released from his playing contract at Luton to take up the role and subsequently retired from playing. On 29 March 2013, he took to the field as a half-time substitute after Bartosz Białkowski was taken ill, and conceded one of the goals in a 2–1 defeat to Brentford at Griffin Park. On 1 February 2014 he again took to the field, conceding two goals, but making some key saves, in a 2–0 defeat to Preston North End at Deepdale. He left the club in January 2017.

In January 2017, he joined the coaching staff at Cambridge United. He registered as a player at the Abbey Stadium for the 2018–19 season and was named on the substitutes bench in a 3–2 win over his former club Notts County on 11 August. He joined Barnsley's coaching staff in July 2019, leaving him at a club two division higher and closer to his Lincolnshire home.

In November 2021, he returned to Luton Town as their goalkeeper coach, working alongside Kevin Dearden. He assisted Alex Lawless when Lawless became caretaker manager in October 2025.

== Career statistics ==
Appearances and goals by club, season and competition
Club	Season	League			National cup (Note: Includes FA Cup, Scottish Cup, Welsh Cup)		League cup (Note: Includes Football League Cup, Scottish League Cup, Welsh League Cup)		Other		Total	
Club	Season	Division	Apps	Goals	Apps	Goals	Apps	Goals	Apps	Goals	Apps	Goals
Manchester United	1992–93	Premier League	0	0	0	0	0	0	0	0	0	0
Manchester United	1993–94	Premier League	0	0	0	0	0	0	0	0	0	0
Manchester United	1994–95	Premier League	1	0	0	0	0	0	0	0	1	0
Manchester United	1995–96	Premier League	3	0	1	0	1	0	0	0	5	0
Manchester United	1996–97	Premier League	0	0	0	0	0	0	0	0	0	0
Manchester United	1997–98	Premier League	2	0	0	0	0	0	0	0	2	0
Manchester United	Total		6	0	1	0	1	0	0	0	8	0
Rochdale (loan)	1995–96	Third Division	6	0	0	0	0	0	0	0	6	0
Rotherham United (loan)	1996–97	Second Division	17	0	0	0	0	0	0	0	17	0
Celtic (loan)	1997–98	SPL	0	0	0	0	0	0	0	0	0	0
Port Vale	1998–99	First Division	8	0	1	0	0	0	—		9	0
Port Vale	1999–2000	First Division	15	0	0	0	1	0	—		16	0
Port Vale	Total		23	0	1	0	1	0	0	0	25	0
Aberystwyth Town	2000–01	League of Wales	1	0	0	0	0	0	0	0	1	0
Wigan Athletic	2000–01	Second Division	0	0	0	0	0	0	0	0	0	0
Mansfield Town	2000–01	Third Division	2	0	0	0	0	0	1 (Note: Appearance in the EFL Trophy.)	0	3	0
Mansfield Town	2001–02	Third Division	45	0	3	0	1	0	0	0	49	0
Mansfield Town	2002–03	Second Division	32	0	2	0	1	0	1	0	36	0
Mansfield Town	2003–04	Third Division	49	0	4	0	1	0	1	0	55	0
Mansfield Town	2004–05	League Two	42	0	2	0	1	0	1	0	46	0
Mansfield Town	Total		170	0	11	0	4	0	4	0	189	0
Notts County	2005–06	League Two	45	0	2	0	1	0	0	0	48	0
Notts County	2006–07	League Two	39	0	1	0	0	0	0	0	40	0
Notts County	2007–08	League Two	32	0	2	0	1	0	0	0	35	0
Notts County	2008–09	League Two	25	0	0	0	1	0	0	0	26	0
Notts County	Total		141	0	5	0	3	0	0	0	149	0
Luton Town	2009–10	Conference Premier	8	0	3	0	—		0	0	11	0
Luton Town	2010–11	Conference Premier	3	0	0	0	—		0	0	3	0
Luton Town	2011–12	Conference Premier	12	0	3	0	—		0	0	15	0
Luton Town	Total		23	0	6	0	0	0	0	0	29	0
Mansfield Town (loan)	2010–11	Conference Premier	10	0	1	0	—		0	0	11	0
Notts County	2012–13	League One	1	0	0	0	0	0	0	0	1	0
Notts County	2013–14	League One	1	0	0	0	0	0	0	0	1	0
Notts County	2014–15	League One	1	0	0	0	0	0	0	0	1	0
Notts County	2015–16	League One	0	0	0	0	0	0	0	0	0	0
Notts County	2016–17	EFL League Two	0	0	0	0	0	0	0	0	0	0
Notts County	Total		3	0	0	0	0	0	0	0	3	0
Cambridge United	2018–19	EFL League Two	0	0	0	0	0	0	0	0	0	0
Career total			400	0	25	0	9	0	4	0	438	0

== Honours ==
Individual

- Denzil Haroun Reserve Team Player of the Year: 1994–95
