= Wayne Corden =

English footballer

Personal information
- Full name: Simon Wayne Corden
- Date of birth: 1 November 1975 (age 50)
- Place of birth: Leek, Staffordshire, England
- Height: 5 ft 10 in (1.78 m)
- Position: Midfielder

Youth career
- 1986–1994: Port Vale

Senior career*
| Years | Team | Apps | (Gls) |
| 1994–2000 | Port Vale | 66 | (1) |
| 2000–2005 | Mansfield Town | 192 | (35) |
| 2005–2006 | Scunthorpe United | 17 | (0) |
| 2006 | → Chester City (loan) | 2 | (0) |
| 2006 | → Leyton Orient (loan) | 8 | (2) |
| 2006–2008 | Leyton Orient | 68 | (3) |
| 2008 | → Notts County (loan) | 9 | (0) |
| 2008 | Colwyn Bay | | |
| 2008–2012 | Leek Town | 100 | (7) |
| 2011 | → Eccleshall (loan) | | |
| 2013–2014 | Kidsgrove Athletic | | |
| 2014–2015 | Rocester | | |
| 2015 | Leek Town | 1 | (0) |
| Total | | 463+ | (48+) |
- * Club domestic league appearances and goals

Simon Wayne Corden (1 November 1975) is an English former footballer who played as a midfielder. He had a 14-year career in the Football League, as well as four years in the Northern Premier League.

He began his career with Port Vale in 1994, making 68 league appearances in a six-year stay. He then spent five years at Mansfield Town, playing 218 games in all competitions and helping the club to win promotion out of the Third Division in 2001–02. He then spent a year at Scunthorpe United, helping the club to promotion out of League Two in 2004–05. He also played on loan at Chester City and Leyton Orient, helping Orient to win promotion out of League Two in 2005–06, before he joined the club permanently in summer 2006. He spent two years at the club before his release in 2008 following a loan spell with Notts County. He joined Leek Town via Colwyn Bay, played on loan at Eccleshall, and retired in January 2012. He made a return to amateur football with Kidsgrove Athletic in July 2013 and later turned out for Rocester.

== Career ==
=== Port Vale ===
Corden came through the ranks at local side Port Vale after being spotted by Mike Pejic. He signed professional forms in July 1994 and made his debut as a substitute against Notts County on 7 May 1995. He played twelve First Division games in 1996–97. He scored a memorable goal in a 1998 FA Cup third round replay against Arsenal, taking the giants to penalties after Dennis Bergkamp had given Arsenal the lead in extra time. After disposing of Vale 4–3 on penalties, the "Gunners" went on to win the competition. This was his first senior goal; his second came in a 2–1 defeat to Sheffield United at Bramall Lane. Overall, Corden played 35 games under John Rudge in 1997–98. He was limited to 16 appearances in 1998–99, as Rudge was sacked and replaced by Brian Horton in January. Corden remained at Vale Park until the end of the 1999–2000 season, when he was given a free transfer, having been given just two games throughout the campaign due to a back problem.

=== Mansfield Town ===
Corden signed for Bill Dearden's Mansfield Town in 2000 and scored five goals in 40 games in 2000–01. He then helped the team achieve promotion to the Second Division in 2001–02, scoring nine goals in 51 games. The club were relegated back into the Third Division under Keith Curle's management at the end of the 2002–03 campaign. However, Corden managed to hit 13 goals in his 48 appearances. He then scored eight goals in 52 games in 2003–04. He played in the play-off final, which Mansfield lost on penalties to Huddersfield Town; Corden's spot-kick was saved by Paul Rachubka in the shootout. He scored three goals in 27 games in 2004–05, to take his total tally in his five years with the club to 218 games and 38 goals in league and cup.

=== Scunthorpe United ===
In February 2005, he moved on to Brian Laws' Scunthorpe United, following a row with Mansfield manager Carlton Palmer. He played eight games as "Scunny" secured promotion out of League Two by finishing as the division's runners-up. He then played 16 games in 2005–06, before in a move that reunited him with former manager Keith Curle he joined Chester City on loan in January 2006. However, he appeared just twice for Chester, before he joined Leyton Orient on loan in March. He scored twice in eight games as Orient won automatic promotion out of League Two; his two goals won the team three points that kept them above fourth-placed Grimsby Town.

=== Leyton Orient ===
Scunthorpe released him in May 2006, and Leyton Orient manager Martin Ling quickly signed him to a two-year deal. He scored five goals in 46 games in 2006–07, as Orient avoided relegation by a four-point margin. He played 28 League One games in 2007–08, before in March, he joined Ian McParland's Notts County on loan until the end of the season. He played nine games for County as the club avoided losing their Football League status after finishing just six points ahead of Mansfield Town. At the end of the season he was released by the O's.

=== Later career ===
In August 2008, Corden joined Grimsby Town for training in an attempt to build up his fitness and played in a friendly with Brigg Town. The next month he signed for his home town club Leek Town of the Northern Premier League on a pay-as-you-play contract, after a brief spell with Colwyn Bay. He was loaned out to Eccleshall of the North West Counties Football League in the 2011–12 season. He retired in January 2012, having scored seven goals in 109 games for Leek. However, he came out of retirement in July 2013 to play for Northern Premier League side Kidsgrove Athletic. The "Grove" finished bottom of the Division One South in 2013–14 and were relegated. He went on to play for Rocester in the Midland Football Alliance.

== Post-retirement ==
After retiring from club football, Corden began playing pub football in the Staffordshire Potteries League Veterans' Division. He works at a specialist school for children with special education needs.

== Career statistics ==
Appearances and goals by club, season and competition
| Club | Season | League | | | FA Cup | | Other | | Total | |
| Club | Season | Division | Apps | Goals | Apps | Goals | Apps | Goals | Apps | Goals |
|---|---|---|---|---|---|---|---|---|---|---|
| Port Vale | 1994–95 | First Division | 1 | 0 | 0 | 0 | 0 | 0 | 1 | 0 |
| Port Vale | 1995–96 | First Division | 2 | 0 | 0 | 0 | 0 | 0 | 2 | 0 |
| Port Vale | 1996–97 | First Division | 12 | 0 | 0 | 0 | 1 | 0 | 13 | 0 |
| Port Vale | 1997–98 | First Division | 33 | 1 | 2 | 1 | 2 | 0 | 37 | 2 |
| Port Vale | 1998–99 | First Division | 16 | 0 | 1 | 0 | 1 | 0 | 18 | 0 |
| Port Vale | 1999–2000 | First Division | 2 | 0 | 0 | 0 | 0 | 0 | 2 | 0 |
| Port Vale | Total | | 66 | 1 | 3 | 1 | 4 | 0 | 73 | 2 |
| Mansfield Town | 2000–01 | Third Division | 34 | 3 | 1 | 0 | 5 | 2 | 40 | 5 |
| Mansfield Town | 2001–02 | Third Division | 46 | 8 | 3 | 1 | 2 | 0 | 51 | 9 |
| Mansfield Town | 2002–03 | Second Division | 44 | 13 | 2 | 0 | 2 | 0 | 48 | 13 |
| Mansfield Town | 2003–04 | Third Division | 44 | 8 | 3 | 0 | 8 | 0 | 52 | 8 |
| Mansfield Town | 2004–05 | League Two | 24 | 3 | 1 | 0 | 2 | 0 | 27 | 3 |
| Mansfield Town | Total | | 192 | 35 | 10 | 1 | 19 | 2 | 221 | 38 |
| Scunthorpe United | 2004–05 | League Two | 8 | 0 | 0 | 0 | 0 | 0 | 8 | 0 |
| Scunthorpe United | 2005–06 | League One | 9 | 0 | 2 | 0 | 5 | 0 | 16 | 0 |
| Scunthorpe United | Total | | 17 | 0 | 2 | 0 | 5 | 0 | 24 | 0 |
| Chester City (loan) | 2005–06 | League Two | 2 | 0 | 0 | 0 | 0 | 0 | 2 | 0 |
| Leyton Orient | 2005–06 | League Two | 8 | 2 | 0 | 0 | 0 | 0 | 8 | 2 |
| Leyton Orient | 2006–07 | League One | 42 | 3 | 3 | 2 | 1 | 0 | 46 | 5 |
| Leyton Orient | 2007–08 | League One | 26 | 0 | 2 | 0 | 2 | 0 | 30 | 0 |
| Leyton Orient | Total | | 76 | 5 | 5 | 2 | 3 | 0 | 84 | 7 |
| Notts County (loan) | 2007–08 | League Two | 9 | 0 | 0 | 0 | 0 | 0 | 9 | 0 |
| Leek Town | 2008–09 | Northern Premier League; Division One South | 30 | 2 | 0 | 0 | 2 | 0 | 32 | 2 |
| Leek Town | 2009–10 | Northern Premier League; Division One South | 35 | 3 | 0 | 0 | 3 | 0 | 38 | 3 |
| Leek Town | 2010–11 | Northern Premier League; Division One South | 32 | 2 | 1 | 0 | 4 | 0 | 37 | 2 |
| Leek Town | 2011–12 | Northern Premier League; Division One South | 3 | 0 | 1 | 0 | 0 | 0 | 4 | 0 |
| Leek Town | 2014–15 | Northern Premier League; Division One South | 1 | 0 | 0 | 0 | 0 | 0 | 1 | 0 |
| Leek Town | Total | | 101 | 7 | 2 | 0 | 9 | 0 | 112 | 7 |
| Career total | | | 463 | 48 | 22 | 4 | 40 | 2 | 525 | 54 |

== Honours ==
Mansfield Town

- Football League Third Division third-place promotion: 2001–02

Scunthorpe United

- League Two second-place promotion: 2004–05

Leyton Orient

- League Two third-place promotion: 2005–06
