= Liam Lawrence =

English-born Irish footballer (born 1981)

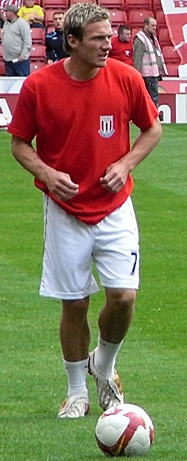
- Lawrence warming up for Stoke City

Personal information
- Full name: Liam Lawrence
- Date of birth: 14 December 1981 (age 44)
- Place of birth: Retford, England
- Height: 1.80 m (5 ft 11 in)
- Position: Right winger

Team information
- Current team: Stoke City (U21 assistant lead coach)

Youth career
- 1988–1991: Retford United
- 1991–1996: Nottingham Forest
- 1996–1999: Mansfield Town

Senior career*
Years	Team	Apps	(Gls)
1999–2004	Mansfield Town	136	(35)
2004–2007	Sunderland	73	(10)
2006–2007	→ Stoke City (loan)	8	(2)
2007–2011	Stoke City	105	(21)
2010–2011	→ Portsmouth (loan)	17	(7)
2011–2012	Portsmouth	37	(0)
2012	→ Cardiff City (loan)	13	(1)
2012–2014	PAOK	29	(3)
2014	Barnsley	14	(1)
2014–2016	Shrewsbury Town	51	(5)
2016–2017	Bristol Rovers	16	(1)
2017	Rushall Olympic		
Total		499	(86)

International career
2009–2011	Republic of Ireland	15	(2)
- * Club domestic league appearances and goals

Liam Lawrence (born 14 December 1981) is a former professional footballer who played as a right winger. He is currently U21 assistant lead coach at Stoke City.

Lawrence started his career at his local club Mansfield Town, after impressing at the Field Mill he signed for Sunderland in June 2005. He joined Stoke City, on loan in 2006, and made his move permanent in January 2007. He became a key player for Stoke, and helped the club to promotion to the Premier League in 2008, earning himself Player of the Year award. In September 2010, he signed for Portsmouth on loan, and signed permanently in the January transfer window. With Portsmouth in financial difficulties he spent time out on loan at Cardiff City and joined Greek side PAOK in the summer of 2012. He then returned to England for a brief spell at Barnsley in 2014 before joining Shrewsbury Town, captaining the side to promotion to League One in his only full season before a free transfer to Bristol Rovers.

Born in England, Lawrence made his international debut for the Republic of Ireland in 2009, and earned 15 caps in a two-year spell.

== Club career ==
=== Mansfield Town ===
Lawrence was born in Retford, Nottinghamshire, and joined Mansfield Town's youth team in 1996. He progressed the through to the first team making his professional debut against Blackpool in the Football League Trophy in the 1999–2000 season. He played 18 matches in 2000–01 scoring four goals as Mansfield finished in 13th position. In 2001–02 he made 37 appearances as the Stags gained promotion to the third tier however relegation was suffered in the following 2002–03 season with Lawrence playing in 46 matches scoring 12 goals. In 2003–04 Lawrence played in 52 games and scored 21 goals for the club helping then to reach the play-offs. After over coming Northampton Town on penalties Mansfield faced Huddersfield Town in the final. After a 0–0 draw they faced another penalty shootout but Mansfield lost 4–1 with Lawrence missing his penalty.

=== Sunderland ===
Lawrence joined Sunderland in June 2004 for a fee of £175,000. Lawrence had a promising first season at Sunderland, scoring 6 goals in 32 appearances, including two superb strikes against Wolverhampton Wanderers at the Stadium of Light on 2 November 2004. He also helped create one of the most important goals in Sunderland's season, scored by Marcus Stewart, against Wigan Athletic at the JJB Stadium. Sunderland won the Championship in 2004–05 and gained promotion to the Premier League.

Following Sunderland's promotion to the top flight Lawrence found himself in and out of the first team squad for the first few months of the 2005–06 season. Despite this, Lawrence still made 23 starts and 10 substitute appearances for the club, scoring against Fulham, Chelsea, and Sunderland's bitter rivals Newcastle United at St James' Park. Although the season ended in disaster for Sunderland, who were relegated with a then record low of 15 points, Lawrence ended the season as runner up to teammate Dean Whitehead for the annual Player of the Year award, and was seen as one of Sunderland's better performers. Lawrence and Whitehead both signed new contracts in August 2006.

=== Stoke City ===
Lawrence joined Stoke City initially on loan in November 2006 after falling out of favour with Roy Keane with the deal becoming permanent in January 2007. He made a fine start to his Stoke career scoring against Cardiff City and Ipswich Town. In 2006–07 Stoke narrowly missed out on the play-offs finishing in 8th position. In 2007–08 Lawrence played in 44 matches scoring 15 goals as Stoke gained promotion to the Premier League in 2nd position. Lawrence struck a great partnership with Ricardo Fuller and the pair scored a combined total of 30 goals with Lawrence winning the player of the year award.

Lawrence scored Stoke's first home goal in the Premier League in 2008 when he scored a penalty against Aston Villa. However Lawrence injured himself when he tripped over his pet Labrador damaging his ankle. He had to undergo ankle surgery to repair a tear in the ligament. He returned from injury towards the end of the season and scored winning goals in games against Blackburn Rovers and Hull City, with the latter securing Stoke's survival. Lawrence signed a new contract at Stoke in July 2009 keeping him at the Britannia Stadium until 2013. Lawrence found himself in and out of the side in 2009–10 making 25 league appearances of which 11 were as a substitute and he scored once against Hull City in April. After the season ended Lawrence stated that he expected to leave Stoke during the summer of 2010.

=== Portsmouth ===
On 31 August, the summer transfer window deadline day, Lawrence and Stoke teammate Dave Kitson were a part of an exchange deal, which sent Portsmouth defender Marc Wilson to the Potters, with the pair moved in the opposite direction. The deal was supposedly completed and the two Stoke players arrived at Fratton Park, but paperwork was not submitted in time for the transfer to go through. He eventually made an emergency-loan move to Pompey on 9 September Lawrence made his Portsmouth debut on 11 September in a 0–0 draw with Ipswich at Fratton Park. He scored his first goal for the club against Leicester City in the Football League Cup on 21 September. On 24 September, he scored his first league goals, a penalty and a deflected free kick in their 6–1 league win over Leicester City. On 2 October, Lawrence scored a late equaliser as Portsmouth drew 2–2 with Middlesbrough at the Riverside to notch up his fourth Portsmouth goal in just seven matches. On 30 October, he netted the winner from inside the box as Pompey beat Nottingham Forest 2–1 at Fratton Park.

On 1 January 2011, Lawrence completed his permanent move to Portsmouth, signing until the summer of 2014. Following Portsmouth's plunge into administration, Lawrence insisted that he would not walk out on the club, but manager Michael Appleton said that Portsmouth could not afford to scan the injured calf of Lawrence as the Rudimentary payments for injury assessments could also not be completed. He left Portsmouth on 10 August 2012 after agreeing to a compromise deal to terminate his contract.

=== Cardiff City ===
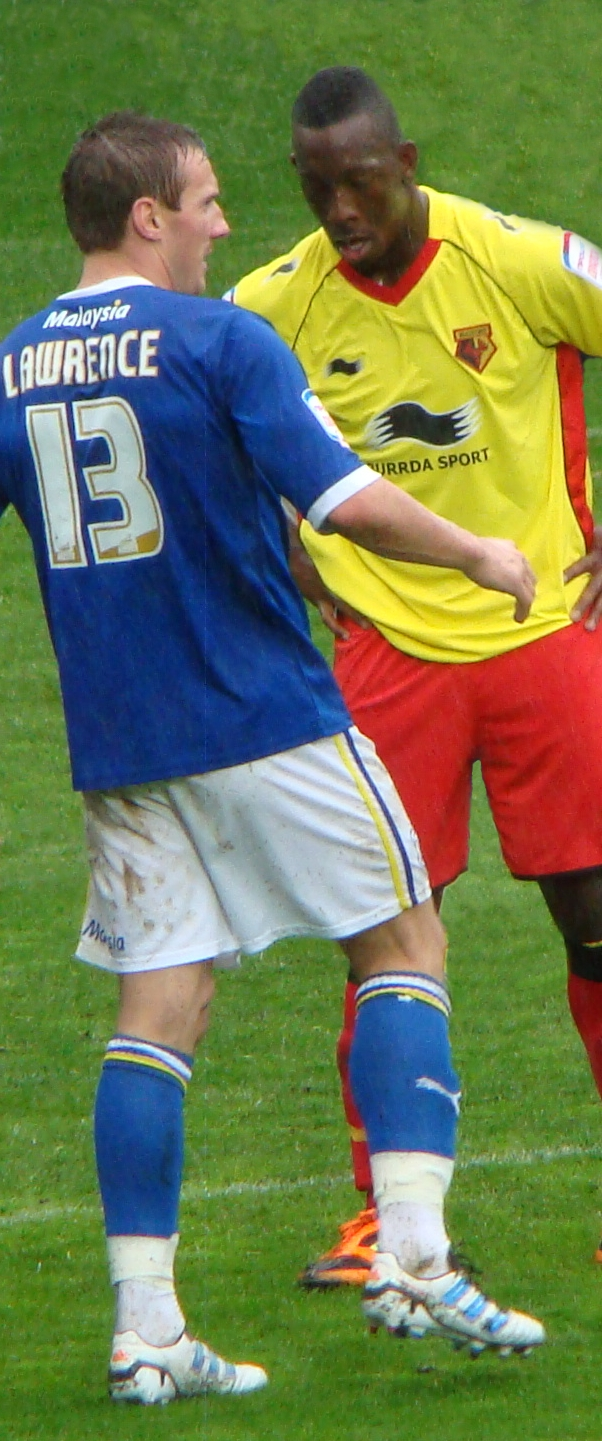
Lawrence and Watford's Lloyd Doyley in April 2012

Lawrence joined Championship rivals Cardiff City on loan till the end of the season as Portsmouth's dire financial situation meant they needed to take cost-cutting measures. He went on to make his debut on 7 March against Brighton & Hove Albion, where he set up the second goal for Cardiff. He scored his first goal for the club on 14 April in a 1–0 win over Barnsley.

Lawrence was interested in making the move permanent but manager Malky Mackay stated that he was interested but signing him wasn't priority. On 8 August 2012, Cardiff had opened talks with Lawrence over a possible permanent transfer as Portsmouth needed to clear the wage bill by 10 August or be liquidated. After leaving Portsmouth, Lawrence revealed he was offered a new contract with his wages reduced (60 or 70 per cent cut) but he was told by administrator Trevor Birch the negotiations was withdrawn as the club couldn't afford an offer from Balram Chainrai as he attempted to purchase the club Previously, Lawrence was keen to stay at the club, insisting he doesn't want to be responsible for liquidating the club

=== PAOK ===
After leaving Portsmouth on 13 August Lawrence agreed to join Greek side PAOK on a two-year contract. Lawrence would wear number 20 on his jersey. He made his official debut for the club on 23 August 2012 in a 2–1 home win against Rapid Wien. On 16 September 2012 he scored his first goal for the club against Asteras Tripolis. He scored a magnificent volley against fierce rivals Aris in a 4–1 home win. In his first season in the club he got sent-off twice, in matches against Aris and AEK Athens.

=== Barnsley ===
Lawrence joined Championship side Barnsley on 16 January 2014, signing a contract until the end of the 2013–14 season. He played 14 times for the Tykes scoring once as the side suffered relegation and at the end of the campaign he was not offered a new contract at Oakwell.

=== Shrewsbury Town ===
On 4 July 2014, Lawrence signed a two-year contract with League Two side Shrewsbury Town. He made his competitive debut on the first day of the league season on 9 August, as the captain, and set up James Collins in the 9th minute to open a 2–2 draw away to AFC Wimbledon.

Having been sent off in a match against Northampton Town two weeks later, and subsequently serving a three-match suspension, Lawrence did not immediately regain his place in the side, having to wait until he was recalled for a League Cup third round tie at home against Norwich City on 23 September 2014. Lawrence had a hand in the winning goal, as his second-half free kick was headed on by Jermaine Grandison, for James Collins to loop over Norwich goalkeeper Declan Rudd.

He scored his first goal for Shrewsbury on 1 November 2014, converting an injury time penalty away from home against Dagenham and Redbridge to seal a 2–1 win, extending the club's winning sequence in League Two to five matches, following this with the only goal of the game as Shrewsbury defeated Walsall in an FA Cup first round replay at the New Meadow.

Lawrence scored both goals as Shrewsbury defeated Oxford United 2–0 on 21 March 2015, a 2nd-minute penalty and a 20-yard late free kick, taking his season tally to six in all competitions. A regular in the side during the season run-in, promotion to League One was secured in April 2015 after a 1–0 away win at Cheltenham Town, with the club ending the season as runners-up to Burton Albion.

=== Bristol Rovers ===
Lawrence did not regularly start for Shrewsbury following their promotion and, as one of the club's higher earners, was allowed to join League Two side Bristol Rovers on a free transfer on 7 January 2016. Lawrence was picked in the Starting XI a number of times and he scored his first goal for the club as his perfectly placed Free-kick saw his side win 3–0 against Crawley Town. Lawrence helped Rovers achieve automatic promotion seeing his side reach 85 points and overtaking Accrington Stanley on the last day of the season.

He made four appearances in the 2016–17 season before being told along with five others to find a new club on 19 January 2017 and on 31 January 2017 he left the club by mutual consent.

== International career ==
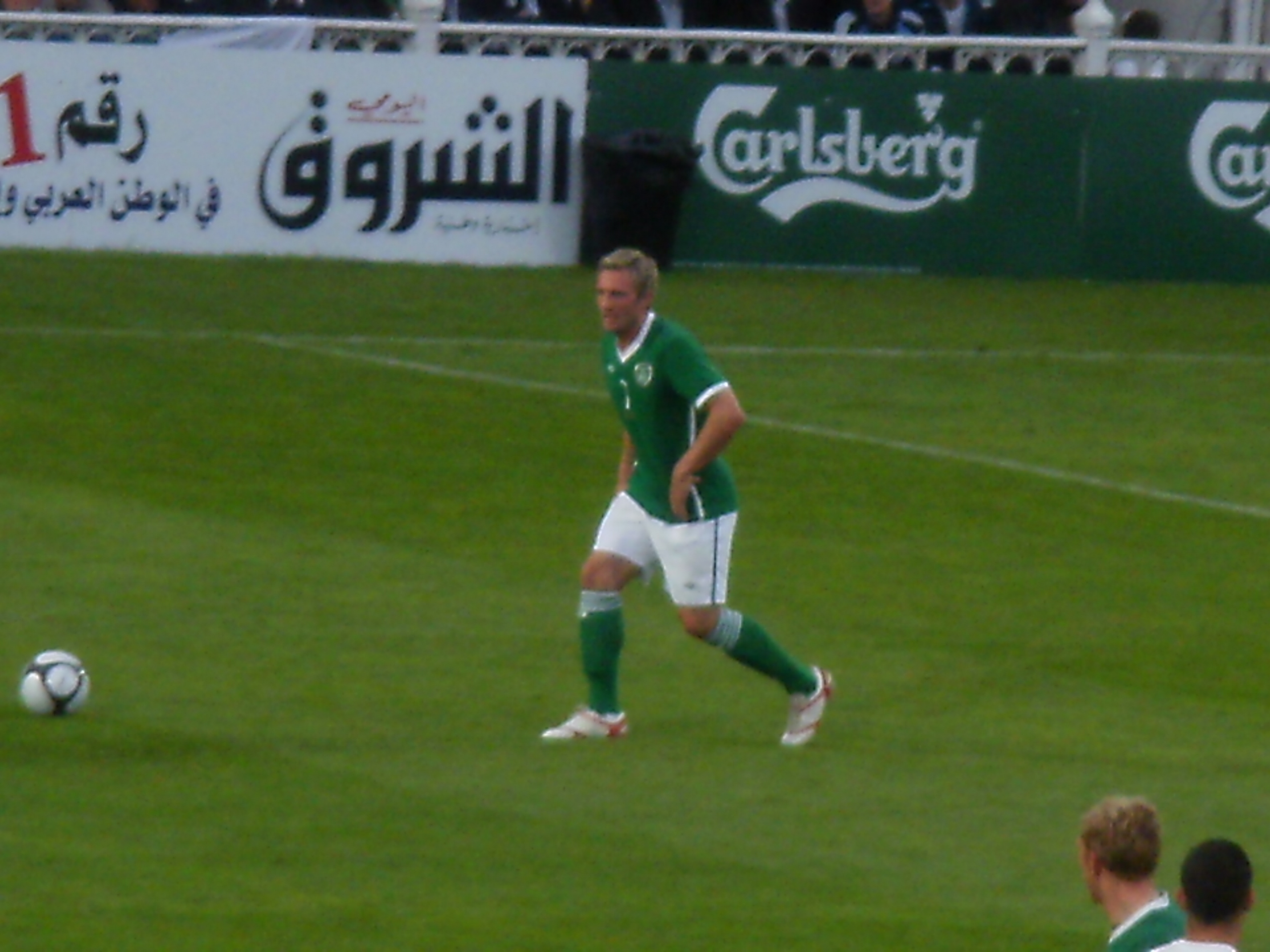
Lawrence playing for Republic of Ireland against Algeria in a 2010 friendly

Lawrence is an Irish citizen through his County Kerry-born grandfather. On 16 February 2006, Lawrence received his first international call-up, for the Republic of Ireland in their friendly game against Sweden on 3 March, but spent the entire match as an unused substitute. On 18 May 2009, Lawrence was named in the Irish squad for a friendly with Nigeria and subsequently made his debut in that match ten days later. Following this, Lawrence was named in the starting eleven for Ireland's friendly against South Africa on 8 September and scored the only goal of the game, a free kick in the 37th minute for his first international goal. Lawrence made his competitive international debut in Ireland's penultimate 2010 FIFA World Cup qualifier against Italy in Croke Park on 10 October, and provided an assist for his Stoke City teammate Glenn Whelan to open the scoring in the match, which ended 2–2. He also made a start against France in the first-leg of Ireland's crucial 2010 FIFA World Cup play-off on 14 November, which France won 1–0, with Nicolas Anelka netting the only goal.

== Coaching career ==
In August 2020, Lawrence began coaching at the Stoke City Academy, taking charge of the under-15 team. He moved up to the under-21 side in July 2024, working alongside Ryan Shawcross. In November 2025, following the departure of head coach David Hibbert, he was appointed interim head coach of the under-21 side. He moved back to his assistant role in June 2026, working alongside Sam Stockley.

== Career statistics ==
=== Club ===
Appearances and goals by club, season and competition
Club	Season	League			Cup		League Cup		Other		Total	
Club	Season	Division	Apps	Goals	Apps	Goals	Apps	Goals	Apps	Goals	Apps	Goals
Mansfield Town	1999–2000	Third Division	2	0	0	0	0	0	1 (Note: Appearance in Football League Trophy)	0	3	0
Mansfield Town	2000–01	Third Division	18	4	0	0	0	0	0	0	18	4
Mansfield Town	2001–02	Third Division	32	2	3	0	1	0	1	0	37	2
Mansfield Town	2002–03	Second Division	43	10	1	2	1	0	1	0	46	12
Mansfield Town	2003–04	Third Division	41	19	4	3	1	0	3 (Note: Appearances in Third Division play-offs)	0	52	21
Mansfield Town	Total		136	35	8	5	3	0	6	0	153	40
Sunderland	2004–05	Championship	32	6	0	0	2	0	—		34	6
Sunderland	2005–06	Premier League	29	3	2	0	2	0	—		33	3
Sunderland	2006–07	Championship	12	0	0	0	1	0	—		13	0
Sunderland	Total		73	9	2	0	5	0	0	0	80	9
Stoke City	2006–07	Championship	27	5	1	0	0	0	—		28	5
Stoke City	2007–08	Championship	41	14	2	1	1	0	—		44	15
Stoke City	2008–09	Premier League	20	3	1	0	1	0	—		22	3
Stoke City	2009–10	Premier League	25	1	4	0	2	0	—		31	1
Stoke City	Total		113	23	8	1	4	0	0	0	125	24
Portsmouth	2010–11	Championship	31	7	1	0	1	1	—		33	8
Portsmouth	2011–12	Championship	23	0	1	0	1	0	—		25	0
Portsmouth	Total		54	7	2	0	2	1	0	0	58	8
Cardiff City (loan)	2011–12	Championship	13	1	0	0	0	0	2 (Note: Appearances in Championship play-offs)	0	15	1
PAOK	2012–13	Super League Greece	27	3	1	1	—		2 (Note: Appearances in UEFA Europa League)	0	30	4
PAOK	2013–14	Super League Greece	2	0	2	0	—		4	0	8	0
PAOK	Total		29	3	3	1	—		6	0	38	4
Barnsley	2013–14	Championship	14	1	0	0	0	0	—		14	1
Shrewsbury Town	2014–15	League Two	33	5	3	1	3	0	0	0	39	6
Shrewsbury Town	2015–16	League One	18	0	2	0	2	0	1	0	23	0
Shrewsbury Town	Total		51	5	5	1	5	0	1	0	62	6
Bristol Rovers	2015–16	League Two	12	1	0	0	0	0	0	0	12	1
Bristol Rovers	2016–17	League One	4	0	0	0	0	0	1	0	5	0
Bristol Rovers	Total		16	1	0	0	0	0	1	0	17	1
Career Total			499	86	28	7	19	1	16	0	561	95

=== International ===
National team	Year	Apps	Goals
Republic of Ireland
Republic of Ireland	2009	5	1
Republic of Ireland	2010	7	1
Republic of Ireland	2011	3	0
Total		15	2

=== International goals ===
No.	Date	Venue	Opponent	Score	Result	Competition
1	8 September 2009	Thomond Park, Limerick, Ireland	South Africa	1–0	1–0	Friendly
2	25 May 2010	RDS Arena, Dublin, Ireland	Paraguay	2–0	2–1	Friendly

== Honours ==
Mansfield Town

- Football League Third Division third-place promotion: 2001–02

Sunderland

- Football League Championship: 2004–05, 2006–07

Stoke City

- Football League Championship second-place promotion: 2007–08

Shrewsbury Town

- Football League Two second-place promotion: 2014–15

Bristol Rovers

- Football League Two third-place promotion: 2015–16

Republic of Ireland

- Nations Cup: 2011

Individual

- PFA Team of the Year: 2003–04 Third Division, 2007–08 Championship
- Football League Championship Player of the Season: 2007–08
- Stoke City Player of the Year: 2007–08
