= Danny Holyoak =

English footballer

Personal information
- Full name: Daniel Holyoak
- Date of birth: 27 November 1983 (age 42)
- Place of birth: Waltham Forest, England
- Position: Midfielder

Senior career*
Years	Team	Apps	(Gls)
2002	Mansfield Town	2	(0)
2002	Kettering Town		
2002	King's Lynn		
2003	Ilkeston Town		
2004	Stamford		
2005	Spalding United		
2006	Stamford		
Total		2	(0)
- * Club domestic league appearances and goals

Daniel Holyoak (born 27 November 1983) is an English former professional footballer who played in the Football League for Mansfield Town.
