= Chris Wood (footballer, born 1987) =

English footballer

Personal information
- Full name: Christopher Hayden Wood
- Date of birth: 24 January 1987 (age 39)
- Place of birth: Worksop, England
- Height: 5 ft 11 in (1.80 m)
- Position: Defender

Team information
- Current team: Worksop Town

Youth career
- Mansfield Town

Senior career*
Years	Team	Apps	(Gls)
2004–2009	Mansfield Town	18	(0)
2007	→ Ilkeston Town (loan)	7	(0)
2009–2010	Boston United	47	(0)
2010–	Worksop Town	116	(2)
- * Club domestic league appearances and goals as of 15:56, 18 April 2010 (UTC)

Christopher Hayden Wood (born 24 January 1987) is an English professional footballer who plays for Worksop Town in the Northern Premier League. He can play either as a central defender or defensive midfielder.

== Career ==
=== Mansfield Town ===
Born in Worksop, Wood came up through the Mansfield Town youth team where he was captain, before making his first-team debut aged 17 in an FA Cup tie against Colchester United in November 2004. He made his league debut in May 2005, when he came on as a substitute against Rochdale. In late March 2007, Wood was loaned to Ilkeston Town of the Northern Premier League to get first-team experience but was recalled in April to cover for injuries. After Mansfield Town were relegated to the Football Conference at the end of the 2007–08 season, he was out of contract but was offered new terms by the club.

=== Boston United ===
On 1 July 2009, Wood headed south and signed for Boston United. After being a regular in defence, he was released in May 2010 when the club achieved promotion to the Conference North. He made 47 appearances for the Pilgrims but failed to score a goal.

=== Worksop Town ===
In the summer of 2010, he joined his home town club Worksop Town on a free transfer. He made his debut in the away win at Nantwich Town and has been a key member of the first team ever since, regularly playing in the left back position.

== Honours ==
=== Club ===
==== Boston United ====
- Unibond Northern Premier League Premier Division Play-Off Champions: 2009–2010
- Unibond League Challenge Cup Champions, 2009–2010
- Lincolnshire FA County Senior Shield Winners, 2009–2010
