= Mark Hurst (footballer, born 1985) =

English footballer

Personal information
- Full name: Mark Patrick Hurst
- Date of birth: 18 February 1985 (age 41)
- Place of birth: Mansfield, England
- Position: Defender

Senior career*
Years	Team	Apps	(Gls)
2002–2003	Mansfield Town	3	(0)
2003	Ilkeston Town		
2004	Sutton Town		
Total		3	(0)
- * Club domestic league appearances and goals

Mark Patrick Hurst (born 18 February 1985) is an English former professional footballer who played in the Football League for Mansfield Town.
