= Iyseden Christie =

English footballer

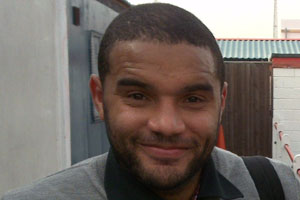

Personal information
- Full name: Iyseden Christie
- Date of birth: 14 November 1976 (age 49)
- Place of birth: Coventry, England
- Position: Striker

Team information
- Current team: Coventry Sphinx

Senior career*
Years	Team	Apps	(Gls)
1995–1997	Coventry City	1	(0)
1996	→ AFC Bournemouth (loan)	4	(0)
1997	→ Mansfield Town (loan)	8	(0)
1997–1999	Mansfield Town	81	(18)
1999–2002	Leyton Orient	58	(12)
2002–2004	Mansfield Town	64	(26)
2004–2006	Kidderminster Harriers	32	(10)
2006–2007	Rochdale	19	(2)
2006	→ Kidderminster Harriers (loan)	19	(8)
2007–2008	Kidderminster Harriers	52	(18)
2008–2009	Stevenage Borough	3	(0)
2008–2009	→ Kettering Town (loan)	13	(5)
2009	Torquay United	6	(1)
2009	King's Lynn	1	(0)
2009	AFC Telford United	2	(0)
2009	Coventry Sphinx	1	(1)
2009	Farnborough	3	(0)
2009–2010	Tamworth	25	(6)
2010–2011	Kettering Town	19	(6)
2011	Nuneaton Town	3	(0)
2011–2012	Tamworth	32	(10)
2012	Alfreton Town	1	(0)
2013–2015	Halesowen Town		
2015	Barwell		
2015–2016	Sutton Coldfield Town		
2016–2019	Bedworth United		
2019–	Coventry Sphinx		
- * Club domestic league appearances and goals as of 18:26, 28 March 2017 (UTC)

Iyseden Christie (born 14 November 1976 in Coventry) is an English former footballer who played for Coventry Sphinx as a striker.

== Playing career ==
=== Coventry City ===
Born in Coventry, West Midlands, Christie began his career as a trainee at Coventry City in 1995. He made his FA Premier League debut on 23 September 1995, appearing as a second-half substitute for Paul Cook in Coventry's 5–1 defeat away to Blackburn Rovers. He made one further appearance, in the League Cup before joining AFC Bournemouth on loan in November 1996, followed by a loan spell with Mansfield Town from February 1997.

=== Mansfield Town ===
He joined Mansfield Town on a free transfer in August 1997 and made over 90 league and cup appearances for Mansfield in two seasons. He joined Leyton Orient for a fee of £40,000 in July 1999, and made over 60 league and cup appearances for Orient in three seasons, before returning to Mansfield Town in August 2002. He made over 70 appearances in his second spell at Mansfield but was released by the club after defeat in the Third Division play-off Final in May 2004.

In 1997, he scored a four-minute hat-trick against Stockport County in a League Cup first-round tie. This remains the record for the fastest League Cup hat-trick.

=== Kidderminster Harriers ===
Christie signed for Kidderminster Harriers at the start of the 2004–05 season, but injury restricted him to just one start and a handful of substitute appearances that season.

=== Rochdale ===
In January 2006, after having scored 10 goals in 23 league games, he was sold to Rochdale along with teammate Mark Jackson for a joint £35,000 transfer fee. In August 2006, Christie returned to Kidderminster on loan until December.

=== Kidderminster Harriers ===
Following the completion of this loan spell Christie re-signed for Kidderminster on an 18-month contract in January 2007.

=== Stevenage Borough ===
He joined Stevenage Borough when his contract with Kidderminster expired at the end of June 2008. He made just three appearances for Stevenage, before joining fellow Conference National side Kettering Town on loan on 2 September 2008 until 17 January 2009. During this period he scored 6 goals in 15 games, including playing against Premier League side Fulham in the FA Cup. It was believed this loan spell was to be ended early for a loan move to York City to go ahead, but this deal fell through.

=== Torquay United ===
On 31 December 2008 it was announced that Christie was to make his loan deal at Kettering permanent on 1 January 2009, in a five-figure deal. However, on 2 February 2009 he left Stevenage to join Torquay United.

=== King's Lynn ===
He signed for non-League King's Lynn in August 2009 after a short period on trial with Hibernians in Malta, following termination of the loan agreement with Torquay at the end of the 2008–09 season.

=== A.F.C. Telford United ===
On 11 September 2009, Christie signed for Conference North side AFC Telford United, but left after two games.

=== Farnborough ===
He played one game for his local team Coventry Sphinx, before making his debut for Farnborough as an 80th-minute substitute on 21 October.

=== Tamworth ===
On 13 November 2009, it was announced that Christie had joined Conference National side Tamworth on non-contract terms. On the same day he was joined by his former Kidderminster teammate Simon Brown, who joined the club on a one-month loan deal from Wrexham.

=== Kettering Town ===
After playing for Tamworth till the end of the 2009–10 season, he rejoined Kettering Town for their 2010–11 campaign.

=== Nuneaton Town ===
On 30 March 2011, Christie joined promotion chasing Conference North side Nuneaton Town until the end of the season. Christie's first game for the club was a 3–0 away win at Gloucester City. Justin Marsden's goal came from a superb bit of individual guile and skill to beat two defenders by Christie before squaring the ball to Marsden to slot home.

=== Tamworth ===
Following a successful trial, Christie returned to The Lambs.

=== Halesowen ===
In the second qualifying round of the 2014–15 FA Cup on 27 September 2014, Christie scored six times against Ellistown & Ibstock United as Halesowen Town advanced to the third qualifying round of the FA Cup with a 7–1 win.

=== Later career ===
Following at stint at Sutton Coldfield Town, Christie signed for Southern Football League side Bedworth United in January 2016.

On 19 August 2019, 44-year old Christie returned to Coventry Sphinx.
