= Lee Williamson =

Association footballer (born 1982)

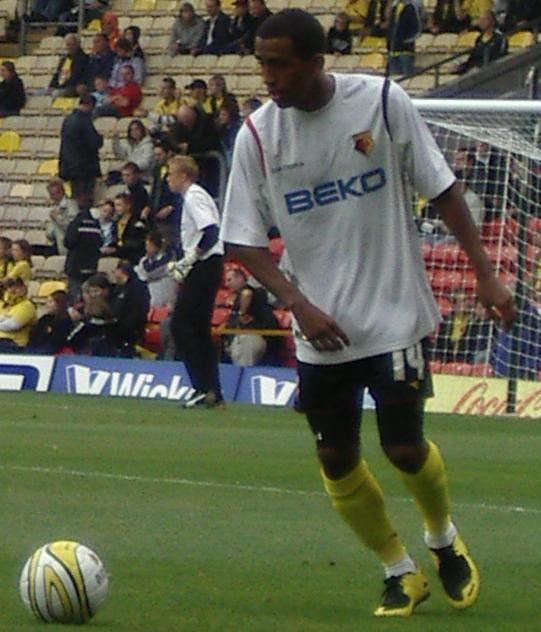
- Williamson warming up for Watford in 2008

Personal information
- Full name: Lee Trevor Williamson
- Date of birth: 7 June 1982 (age 44)
- Place of birth: Derby, England
- Height: 1.78 m (5 ft 10 in)
- Position: Midfielder

Team information
- Current team: Burton Albion (academy coach)

Youth career
- ?–1999: Mansfield Town

Senior career*
Years	Team	Apps	(Gls)
1999–2004	Mansfield Town	144	(3)
2004–2005	Northampton Town	37	(0)
2005–2007	Rotherham United	56	(9)
2007–2009	Watford	71	(4)
2009	→ Preston North End (loan)	5	(1)
2009–2012	Sheffield United	76	(19)
2012–2013	Portsmouth	22	(0)
2013–2016	Blackburn Rovers	79	(0)
2016–2017	Burton Albion	14	(0)
2018–2019	Kimberley Miners Welfare (dual reg)	8	(2)
2018–2020	Kidsgrove Athletic (dual reg)	52	(11)
2020–2021	Congleton Town	5	(0)
Total		569	(49)

International career
2015–2016	Jamaica	9	(0)
- * Club domestic league appearances and goals

Lee Trevor Williamson (born 7 June 1982) is a former professional footballer who is currently an academy coach at Burton Albion

Born in Derby, Williamson started his career at Mansfield Town and went on to play for clubs including Northampton Town, Rotherham United, Watford, Preston North End, Sheffield United, Portsmouth, Blackburn Rovers and Burton Albion. He played internationally for Jamaica, including at Copa América Centenario and during 2018 FIFA World Cup qualification.

== Club career ==
=== Early career ===
Williamson started his career at Mansfield Town, making 165 appearances in his stay at Field Mill. He then moved to Northampton Town early in the 2004–05 season where he quickly established himself as an automatic choice in the first team where he scored two goals.

Williamson then joined Rotherham United in the summer of 2005, and once again established himself in first team.

=== Watford ===
He completed a move to Watford along with teammate Will Hoskins for a combined fee of £1.2 million on 5 January 2007. On 31 January 2007 he played his first Premier League match for Watford against Manchester United.

Williamson scored three times in his first season at Vicarage Road but was then loaned to Preston North End at the end of March until the end of the 2008–09 season. He scored his only Preston goal on 18 April 2009 against Cardiff City which rounded off a 6–0 win at Deepdale.

=== Sheffield United ===
Williamson signed with Sheffield United for an undisclosed fee, believed to be around £500,000, during the 2009 close season. Having suffered a back injury in pre-season Williamson found himself sidelined until the end of October and had to wait until December to score his début goal for the club against Crystal Palace.

He continued to be dogged by injuries during his first season with the Blades and eventually returned for a second operation on his back in the close season. This time, however, Williamson almost died after suffering complications during the operation. He was placed on a life support machine for two days after contracting an infection. Sheffield United's manager at the time Kevin Blackwell commented: "He was placed on life support. He's a very lucky lad to be alive."

On 26 July 2012, on Sheffield United's pre-season tour of Malta, manager, Danny Wilson confirmed Williamson would not sign a new deal with the club and had subsequently been told to stay away from training with the squad. Despite this Wilson refused to rule out Williamson signing a new deal.

=== Portsmouth ===
On 16 August 2012, Williamson signed a one-month deal with Portsmouth. In January 2013 he was released by Portsmouth along with 5 other players due to financial reasons.

=== Blackburn Rovers ===
Williamson signed for Championship side Blackburn Rovers in an 18-month deal on 8 February 2013. He made his debut away at Arsenal in the fifth round of the FA Cup, playing the whole match in gloves alongside Jason Lowe as his new team produced a surprise 1–0 win, courtesy of a late Colin Kazim-Richards goal. On 14 September 2013, Williamson was red-carded in the East Lancashire derby against Burnley after fouling striker Danny Ings in a last man situation during injury time with the scores level at 1–1.

=== Burton Albion ===
On 25 July 2016 Williamson signed for Burton Albion on a one-year deal. He was released at the end of the 2016–17 season.

== International career ==
On 23 May 2008, Williamson was included in a 28-man squad to play for Jamaica. He was again called up in 2015 by Winfried Schäfer, to feature as part of Jamaica's first 2018 FIFA World Cup qualifying squad. He made his international debut on 8 September 2015, playing the full 90 minutes for Jamaica as they beat Nicaragua 4–3 on aggregate to advance to the Fourth CONCACAF Round of qualifying.

== Coaching career ==
In May 2023, Williamson joined Northern Premier League Premier Division club Ilkeston Town as a first-team coach. Williamson is now an academy coach at Burton Albion on the Professional Player to Coach Scheme, a joint programme from The PFA, the Premier League and the EFL designed to increase the number of Black, South Asian and mixed heritage players who transition into full-time coaching roles in the professional game.

== Career statistics ==
Appearances and goals by club, season and competition
Club	Season	League			FA Cup		League Cup		Other		Total	
Club	Season	Division	Apps	Goals	Apps	Goals	Apps	Goals	Apps	Goals	Apps	Goals
Mansfield Town	1999–2000	Division Three	4	0	0	0	0	0	0	0	4	0
Mansfield Town	2000–01	Division Three	15	0	2	0	3	0	1 (Note: Appearance(s) in Football League Trophy)	0	21	0
Mansfield Town	2001–02	Division Three	46	3	3	0	1	0	1	0	51	3
Mansfield Town	2002–03	Division Two	40	0	1	0	1	0	1	0	43	0
Mansfield Town	2003–04	Division Three	35	0	3	0	1	0	4 (Note: One appearance in Football League Trophy; three appearances in Division Three play-offs)	0	43	0
Mansfield Town	2004–05	League Two	4	0	0	0	0	0	0	0	4	0
Mansfield Town	Total		144	3	9	0	6	0	7	0	166	3
Northampton Town	2004–05	League Two	37	0	2	1	1	0	3 (Note: Two appearances one goal in Football League Trophy; one appearance in League Two play-offs)	1	43	2
Rotherham United	2005–06	League One	37	4	1	0	2	0	0	0	40	4
Rotherham United	2006–07	League One	19	5	1	0	1	1	1	0	22	6
Rotherham United	Total		56	9	2	0	3	1	1	0	62	10
Watford	2006–07	Premier League	5	0	0	0	0	0	—		5	0
Watford	2007–08	Championship	32	2	1	0	0	0	2 (Note: Appearance(s) in Championship play-offs)	0	35	2
Watford	2008–09	Championship	34	2	1	0	3	1	—		38	3
Watford	Total		71	4	2	0	3	1	2	0	78	5
Preston North End (loan)	2008–09	Championship	5	1	0	0	0	0	0	0	5	1
Sheffield United	2009–10	Championship	20	3	3	1	0	0	—		23	4
Sheffield United	2010–11	Championship	16	3	1	0	0	0	—		17	3
Sheffield United	2011–12	League One	40	13	4	0	2	0	3 (Note: Appearance(s) in League One play-offs)	0	49	13
Sheffield United	Total		76	19	8	1	2	0	3	0	89	20
Portsmouth	2012–13	League One	22	0	0	0	0	0	2	0	24	0
Blackburn Rovers	2012–13	Championship	9	0	1	0	0	0	—		10	0
Blackburn Rovers	2013–14	Championship	32	0	2	0	0	0	—		34	0
Blackburn Rovers	2014–15	Championship	28	0	5	0	1	0	—		34	0
Blackburn Rovers	2015–16	Championship	10	0	0	0	1	0	—		11	0
Blackburn Rovers	Total		79	0	8	0	2	0	—		89	0
Burton Albion	2016–17	Championship	14	0	1	0	1	0	—		16	0
Kimberley Miners Welfare (dual reg)	2018–19	East Midlands Counties League	8	2	0	0	—		3 (Note: One appearance one goal in FA Vase; two appearances two goals in Nottinghamshire Senior Cup)	3	11	5
Kidsgrove Athletic (dual reg)	2018–19	Northern Premier League D1W	32	5	5	1	—		6 (Note: Two appearances in FA Trophy; one appearance in Northern Premier League Challenge Cup; three appearances in Staffordshire Senior Cup)	0	43	6
Kidsgrove Athletic (dual reg)	2019–20	Northern Premier League D1SE	20	6	3	0	—		6 (Note: Four appearances one goal in FA Trophy; one appearance one goal in Northern Premier League Challenge Cup; one appearance in Staffordshire Senior Cup)	2	29	8
Kidsgrove Athletic (dual reg)	Total		52	11	8	1	—		12	2	72	14
Congleton Town	2020–21	NWCFL Premier Division	5	0	2	1	—		2 (Note: Appearance(s) in FA Vase)	1	9	2
Career total			569	49	42	4	18	2	35	7	664	62

== Honours ==
Individual

- PFA Team of the Year: 2001–02 Third Division
