= Junior Mendes =

English-born Montserratian footballer

Personal information
- Full name: Albert Junior Hillyard Andrew Mendes
- Date of birth: 15 September 1976 (age 50)
- Place of birth: Balham, England
- Position: Striker

Team information
- Current team: Heart of Midlothian (fitness coach)

Youth career
- 1993–1995: Chelsea

Senior career*
Years	Team	Apps	(Gls)
1995–1996	Chelsea	0	(0)
1996–2000	St Mirren	120	(21)
1998	→ Carlisle United (loan)	6	(1)
2000–2002	Dunfermline Athletic	13	(0)
2002–2003	St Mirren	17	(6)
2003–2004	Mansfield Town	57	(12)
2004–2006	Huddersfield Town	30	(5)
2005–2006	→ Northampton Town (loan)	12	(2)
2006	→ Grimsby Town (loan)	15	(0)
2006–2007	Notts County	37	(5)
2007	→ Lincoln City (loan)	9	(0)
2008–2009	Aldershot Town	12	(1)
2009	→ Stevenage Borough (loan)	6	(1)
2009	Ilkeston Town	1	(0)
2009–2010	Ayr United	21	(0)
2012–2013	Nairn County		
2014–2015	Clydebank		
Total		356	(53)

International career
2004–2012	Montserrat	7	(1)
- * Club domestic league appearances and goals

Albert Junior Hillyard Andrew Mendes (born 15 September 1976) is an English-born Montserratian former professional footballer and sports scientist who as of 2024, works as Head of Performance for NIFL Premiership side Coleraine.

As a player he was a striker from 1995 to 2015. Mendes began his career with Premier League side Chelsea in 1995, but was released at the 95–96 season. He went on to play in the Football League for Carlisle United, Mansfield Town, Huddersfield Town, Northampton Town, Grimsby Town, Notts County, Lincoln City and Aldershot Town, in Scotland with St Mirren, Dunfermline Athletic and Ayr United, and in English Non-league football with Stevenage Borough and Ilkeston Town. He has represented Montserrat seven times, scoring one goal.

== Club career ==
He signed for Stevenage Borough in March 2009 on loan until the end of the 2008–09 season. He had a trial with Conference team York City in October 2009, before signing as stand in for one game on non-contract terms for Conference North club Ilkeston Town, to play against Cambridge United in the FA Cup First Round. Mendes signed for Scottish Football League First Division club Ayr United in November 2009, until mid-January.

Mendes signed for Clydebank in November 2014.

== Personal life ==
Mendes studied at University of the West of Scotland completing a MRes in Sport and exercise Science in 2018. Mendes works as a sports scientist and was employed as a fitness coach by a number of Scottish clubs, starting with Scottish League One club Partick Thistle in 2015.
