= Craig Mitchell (footballer) =

English footballer

Personal information
- Full name: Craig Richard Mitchell
- Date of birth: 6 May 1985 (age 41)
- Place of birth: Mansfield, England
- Position: Forward

Senior career*
| Years | Team | Apps | (Gls) |
| 2002–2004 | Mansfield Town | 16 | (1) |
| 2003 | Northwich Victoria | | |
| 2004 | Leigh RMI | | |
| 2004 | Sutton Town | | |
| 2004 | Worksop Town | | |
| 2005 | Sutton Town | | |
| 2006 | Alfreton Town | | |
| 2006 | Sutton Town | | |
| 2007 | Glapwell | | |
| Total | | 16 | (1) |
- * Club domestic league appearances and goals

Craig Richard Mitchell (born 6 May 1985) is an English former professional footballer who played in the English Football League for Mansfield Town.
