= Tom Curle =

English footballer

Personal information
- Full name: Thomas Keith Curle
- Date of birth: 3 March 1986 (age 40)
- Place of birth: Bristol, England
- Position: Midfielder

Senior career*
| Years | Team | Apps | (Gls) |
| 2003–2005 | Mansfield Town | 1 | (0) |
| 2005 | Bradford Park Avenue | | |
| 2005–2006 | Chester City | 2 | (0) |
- * Club domestic league appearances and goals

Tom Curle (born 3 March 1986, in Bristol) is an English former professional footballer. He made appearances in the Football League for Mansfield Town and Chester City, where his father Keith Curle had spells as manager.

Curle made his professional debut as a late substitute in Mansfield's 1–0 home defeat to Yeovil Town on 20 September 2003. This was to be his only league appearance for the Stags, but he did feature in two Football League Trophy matches the following season. The same season saw him have a spell on trial with Chelsea.

The trial did not lead to a permanent contract and Curle played for Bradford Park Avenue until he followed Keith to Chester in time for the 2005-06 season. Once again Curle's appearances were limited and just two substitute league appearances and another Football League Trophy outing followed. He remained at the club after Keith left in February 2006, but the following month he was released.
