= Rhys Day =

Welsh footballer

Personal information
- Full name: Rhys Day
- Date of birth: 31 August 1982 (age 44)
- Place of birth: Bridgend, Wales
- Height: 6 ft 2 in (1.88 m)
- Position: Defender

Youth career
- 1998–2000: Manchester City

Senior career*
| Years | Team | Apps | (Gls) |
| 2000–2003 | Manchester City | 0 | (0) |
| 2001–2002 | → Blackpool (loan) | 9 | (0) |
| 2002–2003 | → Mansfield Town (loan) | 8 | (0) |
| 2003–2006 | Mansfield Town | 95 | (12) |
| 2006–2009 | Aldershot Town | 90 | (6) |
| 2009–2011 | Oxford United | 18 | (0) |
| 2010–2011 | → Mansfield Town (loan) | 8 | (0) |
| 2011–2012 | Mansfield Town | 1 | (0) |
| 2013 | Radcliffe Borough | 3 | (0) |
| 2013–2015 | Hyde | 25 | (0) |
| Total | | 254 | (18) |

International career
| 2000 | Wales U19 | 2 | (0) |
| 2000–2003 | Wales U21 | 11 | (0) |
- * Club domestic league appearances and goals

Rhys Day (born 31 August 1982) is a Welsh former professional footballer who last played as a central defender for Conference North side Hyde.

He was capped several times for the Wales under-21 team and played for Blackpool, Mansfield Town, Aldershot Town and Oxford United.

== Club career ==
Born in Bridgend, Mid Glamorgan, Day began his career at Manchester City, but never broke through to City's first team. He joined Mansfield Town in November 2002, initially on loan, and the move was made permanent in January 2003.

A knee injury kept Day out of action for more than four months in the 2004–05 season, and he also missed large portions of the 2005–06 season with various injuries. Mansfield did not offer Day a new contract at the end of the season, making him a free agent. He signed for Aldershot Town on a two-year contract in July 2006 and was named as captain by new manager Gary Waddock for the 2007–08 campaign.

Day signed a new one-year contract following Aldershot's promotion to the Football League, but in April 2009 it was announced that he would be released at the end of the season. He signed a two-year contract with Oxford United on 23 July.

He was transferred to Mansfield Town from Oxford in January 2011 after gaining promotion to the Football League with them.

Rhys Day retired from the game at the end of the 2011–12 season at the age of 29 because of series of knee injuries that kept him out of the team for a 16-month period. At the time of his retirement he expressed his intention to stay in the game in a coaching capacity.

On 10 September 2013 Day came out of retirement to sign for Hyde after coming through a special training regime with the club. He made his league debut on 28 December when he started against Wrexham.

== International career ==
Day was called up to the senior Wales squad in May 2003 to play United States but was unused and ultimately never capped at that level.

== Personal life ==
Day is the younger brother of professional snooker player Ryan Day.

== Honours ==
=== Club ===
Aldershot

- Conference National (V): 2008

Oxford United

- Conference National (promoted): 2010
