= Tom Curtis (footballer) =

English footballer (born 1974)

Personal information
- Full name: Thomas David Curtis
- Date of birth: 1 March 1974 (age 52)
- Place of birth: Exeter, England
- Height: 5 ft 10 in (1.78 m)
- Position: Midfielder

Senior career*
Years	Team	Apps	(Gls)
1991–1993	Derby County	0	(0)
1993–2000	Chesterfield	255	(16)
2000–2002	Portsmouth	13	(0)
2001	→ Walsall (loan)	4	(0)
2002	→ Tranmere Rovers (loan)	8	(0)
2002–2005	Mansfield Town	93	(4)
2005–2006	Chester City	40	(1)
2006–2007	Notts County	2	(0)
2007–2008	Nuneaton Borough	54	(3)
2008–2009	Alfreton Town	41	(4)
2009–2011	Loughborough University		

Managerial career
- 2011–2012: Antigua Barracuda
- 2011–2012: Antigua and Barbuda
- 2012–2014: Bristol Rovers (Academy Manager)
- 2021–2022: England U17s
- 2024–: England U15s
- * Club domestic league appearances and goals

Thomas David Curtis (born 1 March 1973) is an English retired professional footballer who is England's youth development phase lead at The Football Association. Prior to that he was a Senior Youth Coach Developer at the Football Association, previously he was Academy Manager at Bristol Rovers and Technical Director at the Antigua and Barbuda Football Association.

== Playing career ==
Curtis was born in Exeter, England. He played for several Football League clubs, and is perhaps best remembered for his seven-year spell at Chesterfield, where he played more than 250 games and was part of the Spireites' memorable cup run of 1996–97, where they reached the semi-finals, with Curtis scoring the winner from the penalty spot in Chesterfield's upset victory against Nottingham Forest. Curtis was signed by Chesterfield manager John Duncan at a time when the young footballer was undertaking a university course. Between the player and his manager, a situation was settled upon whereby Tom could continue his education whilst training with the Spireites part-time. His other clubs include Mansfield Town, Chester City (both in a Player/Coach role), Notts County and Portsmouth.

While playing at Mansfield Town, Chester City, Nuneaton Borough and Alfreton Town, he was given the captaincy. At Mansfield, Curtis helped them to the 2004 Third Division Play-off Final. In the semi-finals, Curtis' goal in the second leg against Northampton took the game to a penalty shootout, which Mansfield went on to win. The final against Huddersfield also went to penalties, however this time Mansfield lost and were thus denied promotion. Curtis' only other goal for Mansfield came in the FA Cup against Bishop's Stortford. Whilst at Chester, Curtis scored once in a 3–1 win over Barnet in October 2005.

== Managerial career ==
Curtis was appointed head coach of Loughborough University Football Team in 2007, leading the team to various trophies in his four years in the role.

During his tenure Loughborough University entered the National Football Pyramid at step 6 and were quickly promoted to step 5, part of his role included the design and acquisition of the Loughborough University football stadium, which provides a home for the scholars today.

In April 2008, he was appointed assistant coach to the English Universities squad for the 2008–09 season.

In March 2011, Curtis took up the role of technical director and head coach of the Antigua and Barbuda Football Association. With the job, comes the task of managing Antigua's sole professional team, Antigua Barracuda, in their first season in the United Soccer Leagues Professional Division (the third tier of United States Soccer).

Antigua and Barbuda rose to 79 in the world and reached the semi-final stages of CONCACAF world cup qualification during his stay, by far and away the most successful period in the nations footballing history. Narrow losses to USA and Jamaica meant that they were unable to make the final hexagonal stages.

On 23 October 2012, he resigned from his position as Antigua and Barbuda national team coach and from Antigua Barracuda.

In November 2012 Curtis returned to the UK to take up the role of academy manager at Bristol Rovers, his under-18 team remained unbeaten all season, winning both Youth Alliance League and Cup.

In December 2014 he was appointed a Senior Youth coach Developer for the Football Association. On 26 August 2021, Curtis was confirmed as head coach of the England U17s. On 16 August 2022, Curtis was appointed as the youth development phase lead for England men's teams.

On 23 August 2024, Curtis was confirmed as England U15s head coach.

== Managerial statistics ==
As of 2 May 2011.

Team	Nation	From	To	Matches	Won	Drawn	Lost	Win %
Antigua Barracuda FC	Antigua and Barbuda	25 March 2011	23 October 2012	24	9	2	13	37.5

== Honours ==
Chesterfield

- Football League Third Division play-offs: 1995
