= 2000–01 Mansfield Town F.C. season =

Mansfield Town
2000–01 season
- Manager: Bill Dearden
- Stadium: Field Mill
- Football League Third Division: 13th
- FA Cup: First round
- League Cup: Second round
- Football League Trophy: First round
Home colours

During the 2000–01 English football season, Mansfield Town Football Club competed in the Football League Third Division where they finished in 13th position on 58 points.

== Final league table ==
Pos	Team	Pld	W	D	L	GF	GA	GD	Pts
11	Southend United	46	15	18	13	55	53	+2	63
12	Plymouth Argyle	46	15	13	18	54	61	−7	58
13	Mansfield Town	46	15	13	18	64	72	−8	58
14	Macclesfield Town	46	14	14	18	51	62	−11	56
15	Shrewsbury Town	46	15	10	21	49	65	−16	55

Rules for classification: 1) Points; 2) Goal difference; 3) Goals scored

== Results ==
Mansfield Town's score comes first

=== Legend ===
Win	Draw	Loss

=== Football League Third Division ===
Match	Date	Opponent	Venue	Result	Attendance	Scorers
1	12 August 2000	Cheltenham Town	A	2–2	4,051	Blake, Greenacre
2	19 August 2000	Barnet	A	3–3	1,732	Blake, Greenacre, Clarke
3	26 August 2000	Plymouth Argyle	A	0–2	4,069	
4	28 August 2000	Macclesfield Town	H	4–4	3,360	Blake, Clarke (2), Bradley
5	2 September 2000	Exeter City	A	0–0	2,737	
6	9 September 2000	Halifax Town	H	5–1	2,939	Blake, Greenacre (3), Williams
7	12 September 2000	Hull City	H	1–1	2,629	Clarke
8	16 September 2000	Chesterfield	A	0–4	6,793	
9	23 September 2000	Hartlepool United	H	4–3	2,135	Greenacre (2), Corden, Boulding
10	30 September 2000	Lincoln City	A	2–0	3,494	Boulding, Clarke
11	6 October 2000	York City	A	1–2	2,681	Boulding
12	14 October 2000	Shrewsbury Town	H	1–0	2,206	Boulding
13	17 October 2000	Blackpool	H	0–1	2,328	
14	21 October 2000	Cardiff City	A	0–2	4,625	
15	24 October 2000	Torquay United	A	2–2	1,880	Greenacre, Bacon
16	28 October 2000	Southend United	H	1–1	2,200	Greenacre
17	4 November 2000	Leyton Orient	A	1–2	4,165	Clarke
18	11 November 2000	Rochdale	H	1–0	2,543	Greenacre
19	25 November 2000	Scunthorpe United	A	0–6	3,258	
20	2 December 2000	Darlington	A	1–2	3,087	Pemberton
21	16 December 2000	Brighton & Hove Albion	H	2–0	2,668	Greenacre (2)
22	22 December 2000	Carlisle United	H	1–1	2,247	Barrett
23	26 December 2000	Kidderminster Harriers	H	0–1	3,842	
24	6 January 2001	Plymouth Argyle	A	0–0	2,321	
25	14 January 2001	Macclesfield Town	A	1–0	1,893	Blake
26	23 January 2001	Kidderminster Harriers	H	2–1	1,712	Greenacre, Boulding
27	27 January 2001	Carlisle United	A	1–2	3,375	Bradley
28	2 February 2001	Exeter City	H	1–1	3,830	Corden
29	10 February 2001	Halifax Town	A	4–3	1,857	Williams, Greenacre (2), Clarke (o.g.)
30	13 February 2001	Cheltenham Town	H	2–1	1,940	Blake, Bradley
31	17 February 2001	Chesterfield	H	0–1	7,899	
32	20 February 2001	Hull City	A	1–2	7,248	Corden
33	24 February 2001	Hartlepool United	A	1–1	3,699	Blake
34	27 February 2001	Barnet	H	4–1	1,623	Bradley, Williams, Greenacre (2)
35	3 March 2001	Lincoln City	H	2–3	3,201	Blake, Bradley
36	6 March 2001	Shrewsbury Town	A	1–2	2,219	Williams
37	10 March 2001	York City	H	1–3	2,405	Lawrence
38	17 March 2001	Blackpool	A	2–2	5,241	Greenacre (2)
39	31 March 2001	Brighton & Hove Albion	A	0–2	6,703	
40	14 April 2001	Torquay United	H	0–0	2,225	
41	21 April 2001	Leyton Orient	H	2–0	3,356	Lawrence, Bradley
42	24 April 2001	Cardiff City	H	2–1	2,204	Bradley, Greenacre
43	28 April 2001	Rochdale	A	0–1	3,114	
44	1 May 2001	Darlington	H	3–2	1,878	Brightwell (o.g.), Lawrence, Hassell
45	5 May 2001	Scunthorpe United	H	1–0	2,938	Boulding
46	8 May 2001	Southend United	A	1–3	3,345	Lawrence

=== FA Cup ===
Round	Date	Opponent	Venue	Result	Attendance	Scorers
R1	18 November 2000	Peterborough United	H	1–1	3,257	Greenacre
R1 Replay	28 November 2000	Peterborough United	A	0–4	4,540	

=== League Cup ===
Round	Date	Opponent	Venue	Result	Attendance	Scorers
R1 1st Leg	22 August 2000	Wrexham	H	0–1	1,052	
R1 2nd Leg	5 September 2000	Wrexham	A	3–0	1,447	Greenacre, Corden (2)
R2 1st Leg	20 September 2000	Southampton	A	0–2	8,802	
R2 2nd Leg	26 September 2000	Southampton	H	1–3	3,528	Clarke

=== Football League Trophy ===
Round	Date	Opponent	Venue	Result	Attendance	Scorers
R1	9 December 2000	Bury	A	1–2	1,117	Bacon

== Squad statistics ==
No.	Pos.	Name	League		FA Cup		League Cup		League Trophy		Total	
No.	Pos.	Name	Apps	Goals	Apps	Goals	Apps	Goals	Apps	Goals	Apps	Goals
1	GK	(England) Bobby Mimms	40	0	2	0	3	0	0	0	45	0
2	DF	(England) Alistair Asher	23(5)	0	1	0	2(2)	0	1	0	27(7)	0
3	DF	(England) Martin Pemberton	16(2)	1	1	0	1	0	1	0	19(2)	1
4	DF	(England) Les Robinson	44	0	2	0	4	0	1	0	51	0
5	DF	(England) Stuart Hicks	25	0	1	0	4	0	0	0	30	0
6	DF	(England) Adam Barrett	8	1	0	0	0	0	1	0	9	1
7	MF	(England) Lee Williams	36(3)	4	1(1)	0	4	0	0	0	41(4)	4
8	MF	(England) Darrell Clarke	30(2)	6	0	0	4	1	0	0	34(2)	7
9	FW	(England) Shayne Bradley	21(5)	8	0(2)	0	0(1)	0	1	0	22(8)	8
10	FW	(England) Chris Greenacre	46	19	2	1	4	1	0(1)	0	52(1)	21
11	MF	(England) Wayne Corden	31(3)	3	1	0	4	2	1	0	37(3)	5
12	DF	(England) Bobby Hassell	39(1)	1	1	0	2(1)	0	0	0	42(2)	1
14	MF	(England) Mark Blake	38(3)	8	2	0	3	0	1	0	44(3)	8
15	GK	(England) Ian Bowling	4	0	0	0	1	0	0	0	5	0
15	DF	(England) Stuart Reddington	9	0	0	0	0	0	0	0	9	0
16	MF	(England) Michael Sisson	2(2)	0	0	0	1	0	0	0	3(2)	0
17	FW	(England) Danny Bacon	7(15)	1	0(1)	0	1(2)	0	1	1	9(18)	2
18	FW	(England) Michael Boulding	12(21)	6	2	0	1(1)	0	0(1)	0	15(23)	6
19	DF	(Republic of Ireland) John Andrews	5(3)	0	2	0	4	0	0	0	11(3)	0
20	MF	(England) Craig Disley	16(8)	0	1	0	0	0	1	0	18(8)	0
22	FW	(England) Andy White	0(4)	0	0	0	0	0	0	0	0(4)	0
23	FW	(England) David Jervis	17(5)	0	2	0	0	0	0	0	19(5)	0
24	MF	(England) Lee Williamson	10(5)	0	1(1)	0	0(3)	0	1	0	12(9)	0
25	MF	(Republic of Ireland) Liam Lawrence	7(11)	4	0	0	0	0	0	0	7(11)	4
26	MF	(England) Jamie Lomas	4(2)	0	0	0	1	0	0	0	5(2)	0
27	DF	(England) Jonathan Fortune	14	0	0	0	0	0	0	0	14	0
28	GK	(England) Kevin Pilkington	2	0	0	0	0	0	1	0	3	0
–	–	Own goals	–	2	–	0	–	0	–	0	–	2
