= 2001–02 Mansfield Town F.C. season =

Mansfield Town
2001–02 season
- Manager: Bill Dearden; Stuart Watkiss
- Stadium: Field Mill
- Football League Third Division: 3rd (promoted)
- FA Cup: Third round
- League Cup: First round
- Football League Trophy: First round
Home colours

During the 2001–02 English football season, Mansfield Town Football Club competed in the Football League Third Division where they finished in 3rd position with 79 points, gaining promotion to the Football League Second Division.

== Final league table ==
Pos	Team	Pld	W	D	L	GF	GA	GD	Pts	Qualification or relegation
1	Plymouth Argyle (C, P)	46	31	9	6	71	28	+43	102	Promotion to Football League Second Division
2	Luton Town (P)	46	30	7	9	96	48	+48	97	Promotion to Football League Second Division
3	Mansfield Town (P)	46	24	7	15	72	60	+12	79	Promotion to Football League Second Division
4	Cheltenham Town (O, P)	46	21	15	10	66	49	+17	78	Qualification for the Third Division play-offs
5	Rochdale	46	21	15	10	65	52	+13	78	Qualification for the Third Division play-offs

Rules for classification: 1) Points; 2) Goal difference; 3) Goals scored
(C) Champions; (O) Play-off winners; (P) Promoted

== Results ==
Mansfield Town's score comes first

=== Legend ===
Win	Draw	Loss

=== Football League Third Division ===
Match	Date	Opponent	Venue	Result	Attendance	Scorers
1	11 August 2001	Hartlepool United	A	1–1	3,534	Greenacre
2	18 August 2001	Southend United	H	0–0	2,774	
3	25 August 2001	Cheltenham Town	A	3–2	3,105	Disley (2), Corden
4	27 August 2001	Macclesfield Town	H	4–0	2,681	Disley (2), White, Greenacre
5	1 September 2001	Kidderminster Harriers	A	1–1	2,387	Greenacre
6	8 September 2001	Lincoln City	H	2–1	3,878	Greenacre, Corden
7	14 September 2001	Shrewsbury Town	H	2–1	4,759	Greenacre, Bacon
8	18 September 2001	Halifax Town	A	0–1	1,880	
9	22 September 2001	Scunthorpe United	A	0–0	3,857	
10	25 September 2001	Hull City	H	4–2	5,702	Disley, Hassell, Reddington, Greenacre
11	29 September 2001	Rochdale	A	1–3	3,963	Greenacre
12	5 October 2001	Leyton Orient	H	3–2	5,168	Williamson, Greenacre, Disley
13	13 October 2001	Darlington	A	1–0	4,021	Tankard
14	20 October 2001	Plymouth Argyle	H	0–3	4,621	
15	23 October 2001	Torquay United	H	2–0	4,059	Greenacre, Corden
16	27 October 2001	Rushden & Diamonds	A	1–3	4,937	Bradley
17	3 November 2001	Luton Town	H	4–1	5,973	Bradley, Greenacre (2), Pemberton
18	10 November 2001	Carlisle United	A	1–0	2,546	Greenacre
19	20 November 2001	Bristol Rovers	A	1–0	5,043	Lawrence
20	23 November 2001	York City	H	1–1	4,877	Disley
21	4 December 2001	Swansea City	H	3–0	3,240	Greenacre (2), Piper
22	15 December 2001	Oxford United	A	2–3	5,437	Hatswell (o.g.), Corden
23	21 December 2001	Exeter City	H	0–1	3,958	
24	29 December 2001	Macclesfield Town	H	1–0	2,550	Tankard
25	12 January 2002	Southend United	A	0–1	3,300	
26	19 January 2002	Hartlepool United	H	3–0	4,349	Lee (o.g.), Corden, Greenacre
27	22 January 2002	Exeter City	A	1–0	3,106	Lawrence
28	29 January 2002	Kidderminster Harriers	H	1–1	4,321	Pemberton
29	2 February 2002	Rochdale	H	3–1	4,876	Pemberton, Greenacre (2)
30	9 February 2002	Plymouth Argyle	A	0–1	14,716	
31	12 February 2002	Lincoln City	A	4–1	4,072	Pemberton, Williamson (2), Corden
32	16 February 2002	Darlington	H	4–2	5,107	Corden, Greenacre, Kelly (2)
33	23 February 2002	Shrewsbury Town	A	0–3	4,120	
34	26 February 2002	Halifax Town	H	2–1	4,513	Kelly, Greenacre
35	2 March 2002	Scunthorpe United	H	2–1	6,292	Murray (2)
36	5 March 2002	Hull City	A	1–4	9,158	Bradley
37	9 March 2002	Oxford United	H	2–1	4,916	Murray, Kelly
38	16 March 2002	Swansea City	A	0–2	3,527	
39	19 March 2002	Leyton Orient	A	0–2	3,316	
40	23 March 2002	Torquay United	A	0–0	2,676	
41	30 March 2002	Rushden & Diamonds	H	1–4	5,807	Murray
42	1 April 2002	Luton Town	A	3–5	8,231	Murray, Greenacre, Sellars
43	6 April 2002	Bristol Rovers	H	2–0	3,996	Murray, White
44	9 April 2002	Cheltenham Town	H	2–1	8,633	Greenacre, White
45	13 April 2002	York City	A	1–3	5,460	Murray
46	20 April 2002	Carlisle United	H	2–0	8,638	Corden, White

=== FA Cup ===
Round	Date	Opponent	Venue	Result	Attendance	Scorers
R1	17 November 2001	Oxford United	H	1–0	4,201	Greenacre
R2	8 December 2001	Huddersfield Town	H	4–0	6,836	Greenacre (3), Corden
R3	5 January 2002	Leicester City	A	1–2	14,466	Greenacre

=== League Cup ===
Round	Date	Opponent	Venue	Result	Attendance	Scorers
R1	21 August 2001	Notts County	H	3–4	4,553	Greenacre (2), White

=== Football League Trophy ===
Round	Date	Opponent	Venue	Result	Attendance	Scorers
R1	30 October 2001	Blackpool	H	0–4	3,601	

== Squad statistics ==
No.	Pos.	Name	League		FA Cup		League Cup		League Trophy		Total	
No.	Pos.	Name	Apps	Goals	Apps	Goals	Apps	Goals	Apps	Goals	Apps	Goals
1	GK	(England) Kevin Pilkington	45	0	3	0	1	0	0	0	49	0
2	DF	(England) Alistair Asher	1(9)	0	0(2)	0	0	0	1	0	2(11)	0
3	DF	(England) Martin Pemberton	33(5)	4	1(1)	0	0	0	1	0	35(6)	4
4	DF	(England) Les Robinson	36	0	3	0	1	0	0	0	40	0
5	DF	(England) Stuart Hicks	0	0	0	0	0	0	0	0	0	0
6	DF	(England) Adam Barrett	26(3)	0	3	0	0	0	1	0	30(3)	0
7	MF	(England) Scott Sellars	5(1)	1	0	0	0	0	0	0	5(1)	1
8	FW	(Republic of Ireland) David Kelly	11(6)	4	0	0	0	0	0	0	11(6)	4
9	FW	(England) Shayne Bradley	7(9)	3	2	0	0	0	1	0	10(9)	3
10	FW	(England) Chris Greenacre	43(1)	21	3	5	1	2	0	0	47(1)	28
11	MF	(England) Wayne Corden	46	8	3	1	1	0	1	0	51	9
12	MF	(England) Bobby Hassell	43	1	3	0	1	0	1	0	48	1
13	GK	(England) Michael Bingham	1(1)	0	0	0	0	0	1	0	2(1)	0
14	DF	(England) Allen Tankard	22(8)	2	3	0	1	0	1	0	27(8)	2
15	DF	(England) Stuart Reddington	34(4)	1	0	0	1	0	1	0	36(4)	1
16	MF	(England) Michael Sisson	0	0	0	0	0	0	0	0	0	0
17	FW	(England) Danny Bacon	1(7)	1	1	0	0(1)	0	0	0	2(8)	1
18	MF	(England) Adam Murray	13	7	0	0	0	0	0	0	13	7
18	FW	(England) Michael Boulding	0	0	0	0	0	0	0	0	0	0
19	DF	(Republic of Ireland) John Andrews	0	0	0	0	0	0	0	0	0	0
19	FW	(England) Paul Wheatcroft	1(1)	0	0	0	0	0	0	0	1(1)	0
20	MF	(England) Craig Disley	31(5)	7	2	0	1	0	0	0	34(5)	7
21	MF	(England) Jamie Clarke	1	0	0	0	0	0	0	0	1	0
21	MF	(England) Jamie Lomas	0	0	0	0	0	0	0	0	0	0
22	FW	(England) Andy White	16(6)	4	0(3)	0	1	1	0	0	17(9)	5
23	FW	(England) David Jervis	0(3)	0	0	0	0	0	0(1)	0	0(4)	0
24	MF	(England) Lee Williamson	44(2)	3	3	0	1	0	1	0	49(2)	3
25	MF	(Republic of Ireland) Liam Lawrence	32	2	3	0	1	0	0(1)	0	36(1)	2
26	GK	(England) Jason White	6(1)	0	0	0	0	0	1	0	7(1)	0
27	FW	(England) Richard Harris	0(6)	0	0	0	0	0	0	0	0(6)	0
27	MF	(England) Matt Piper	8	1	0	0	0	0	0	0	8	1
–	–	Own goals	–	2	–	0	–	0	–	0	–	2
