= 1999–2000 Mansfield Town F.C. season =

Mansfield Town
1999–2000 season
- Manager: Bill Dearden
- Stadium: Field Mill
- Football League Third Division: 17th
- FA Cup: First round
- League Cup: First round
- Football League Trophy: Second round
Home colours

During the 1999–2000 English football season, Mansfield Town Football Club competed in the Football League Third Division where they finished in 17th position with 56 points.

== Final league table ==
Pos	Team	Pld	W	D	L	GF	GA	GD	Pts
15	Lincoln City	46	15	14	17	67	69	−2	59
16	Southend United	46	15	11	20	53	61	−8	56
17	Mansfield Town	46	16	8	22	50	65	−15	56
18	Halifax Town	46	15	9	22	44	58	−14	54
19	Leyton Orient	46	13	13	20	47	52	−5	52

Rules for classification: 1) Points; 2) Goal difference; 3) Goals scored

== Results ==
Mansfield Town's score comes first

=== Legend ===
Win	Draw	Loss

=== Football League Third Division ===
Match	Date	Opponent	Venue	Result	Attendance	Scorers
1	7 August 1999	Brighton & Hove Albion	A	0–6	5,882	
2	14 August 1999	Cheltenham Town	H	0–1	2,348	
3	21 August 1999	Southend United	A	0–1	3,533	
4	28 August 1999	Carlisle United	H	1–1	3,533	Roscoe
5	30 August 1999	Exeter City	A	0–1	3,109	
6	3 September 1999	Peterborough United	H	3–1	3,338	Peacock (3)
7	11 September 1999	Leyton Orient	H	1–1	2,491	Peacock (3)
8	18 September 1999	Darlington	A	0–0	5,027	
9	24 September 1999	Shrewsbury Town	H	4–0	2,808	Peacock, Lormor, Sisson
10	2 October 1999	Swansea City	A	1–0	4,263	Lormor
11	9 October 1999	Plymouth Argyle	A	1–2	3,809	Peacock
12	16 October 1999	Hartlepool United	H	2–3	2,612	Lormor, Hassell
13	19 October 1999	Northampton Town	H	0–0	2,940	
14	23 October 1999	Shrewsbury Town	A	2–1	1,785	Lormor, Boulding
15	2 November 1999	Macclesfield Town	A	2–5	1,541	Blake, Clarke
16	6 November 1999	Lincoln City	H	5–2	2,952	Bacon, Clarke (2), Greenacre (2)
17	14 November 1999	Rochdale	A	1–2	2,709	Greenacre
18	23 November 1999	Rotherham United	H	1–2	2,937	Lormor
19	27 November 1999	Halifax Town	A	1–0	2,322	Greenacre
20	18 December 1999	Barnet	A	0–0	1,997	
21	26 December 1999	Chester City	H	2–1	3,234	Richardson (o.g.), Boulding
22	28 December 1999	Hull City	A	0–2	7,215	
23	3 January 2000	Torquay United	H	4–3	2,876	Boulding (2), Greenacre, Clarke
24	8 January 2000	York City	A	1–0	2,458	Sisson
25	15 January 2000	Cheltenham Town	A	0–1	3,315	
26	22 January 2000	Southend United	H	3–1	2,215	Bromby, Lormor, Greenacre
27	29 January 2000	Carlisle United	A	2–0	2,501	Lormor, Clarke
28	1 February 2000	Brighton & Hove Albion	H	1–0	2,541	Lormor
29	4 February 2000	Exeter City	H	1–1	3,092	Lormor
30	8 February 2000	York City	H	1–0	2,571	Roscoe
31	12 February 2000	Peterborough United	A	0–1	5,472	
32	19 February 2000	Halifax Town	H	0–2	2,476	
33	26 February 2000	Darlington	H	1–2	3,114	Boulding
34	4 March 2000	Leyton Orient	A	3–1	4,281	Clarke, Greenacre, Walschaerts (o.g.)
35	7 March 2000	Lincoln City	A	0–3	3,445	
36	11 March 2000	Macclesfield Town	H	1–0	2,327	Greenacre
37	14 March 2000	Rotherham United	A	3–2	5,186	Greenacre, Clarke, Boulding
38	25 March 2000	Chester City	A	0–5	1,953	
39	28 March 2000	Rochdale	H	0–0	2,275	
40	1 April 2000	Barnet	H	0–1	1,960	
41	8 April 2000	Torquay United	A	0–4	1,756	
42	15 April 2000	Hull City	H	0–1	2,213	
43	22 April 2000	Hartlepool United	A	0–1	3,473	
44	24 April 2000	Swansea City	H	0–1	2,162	
45	29 April 2000	Northampton Town	A	0–1	6,901	
46	6 May 2000	Plymouth Argyle	H	2–2	2,031	Bacon, Andrews

=== FA Cup ===
Round	Date	Opponent	Venue	Result	Attendance	Scorers
R1	30 October 1999	Bristol City	A	2–3	5,411	Lormor, Blake

=== League Cup ===
Round	Date	Opponent	Venue	Result	Attendance	Scorers
R1 1st leg	11 August 1999	Nottingham Forest	A	0–3	8,300	
R1 2nd leg	24 August 1999	Nottingham Forest	H	1–0	3,072	Peacock

=== Football League Trophy ===
Round	Date	Opponent	Venue	Result	Attendance	Scorers
R1	7 December 1999	Bury	H	2–1	1,205	Lormor, Roscoe
R2	11 January 2000	Blackpool	H	0–1	1,844	

== Squad statistics ==
No.	Pos.	Name	League		FA Cup		League Cup		League Trophy		Total	
No.	Pos.	Name	Apps	Goals	Apps	Goals	Apps	Goals	Apps	Goals	Apps	Goals
1	GK	(England) Ian Bowling	10(1)	0	1	0	0	0	2	0	13(1)	0
2	DF	(England) Alistair Asher	29(6)	0	0(1)	0	0	0	1(1)	0	30(8)	0
3	DF	(England) Lee Cowling	3(5)	0	0	0	0	0	0	0	3(5)	0
4	MF	(Scotland) David Kerr	10(7)	0	0	0	1	0	0(1)	0	11(8)	0
5	DF	(England) Neil Richardson	31	0	1	0	2	0	1	0	35	0
6	DF	(England) David Linighan	28	0	1	0	2	0	1	0	32	0
7	MF	(England) Lee Williams	46	0	1	0	2	0	2	0	51	0
8	MF	(England) Darrell Clarke	39	7	1	0	0	0	2	0	42	7
9	FW	(England) Tony Lormor	33	9	1	1	2	0	2	1	38	11
10	FW	(Scotland) Lee Peacock	12	7	0	0	2	1	0	0	14	8
11	MF	(Republic of Ireland) Gary Tallon	11(2)	0	0	0	1	0	1	0	13(2)	0
12	DF	(England) Bobby Hassell	8(3)	1	1	0	2	0	0	0	11(3)	1
14	DF	(England) Craig Allardyce	1(3)	0	0	0	0(2)	0	0	0	1(5)	0
15	MF	(England) Craig Disley	2(3)	0	1	0	0	0	0	0	3(3)	0
16	MF	(England) Michael Sisson	24(1)	2	0	0	2	0	2	0	28(1)	2
18	FW	(England) Michael Boulding	16(16)	6	0(1)	0	1(1)	0	1	0	18(18)	6
19	DF	(Republic of Ireland) John Andrews	29(1)	1	0	0	0	0	2	0	31(1)	1
19	MF	(England) Wayne Thomas	4(1)	0	0	0	0	0	0	0	4(1)	0
19	MF	(Belgium) Carlo Camilieri-Gioia	0(2)	0	0	0	0	0	0	0	0(2)	0
20	DF	(England) Andy Roscoe	29(10)	2	1	0	2	0	0(1)	1	32(11)	3
21	GK	(England) Barry Richardson	6	0	0	0	2	0	0	0	8	0
21	GK	(England) Carl Muggleton	9	0	0	0	0	0	0	0	9	0
21	GK	(England) Glyn Thompson	16	0	0	0	0	0	0	0	16	0
22	MF	(England) Mark Blake	40(3)	1	1	1	1	0	2	0	44(3)	2
23	FW	(England) Danny Bacon	6(2)	2	0(1)	0	0	0	0	0	6(3)	2
24	MF	(England) Lee Williamson	0(4)	0	0	0	0	0	0	0	0(4)	0
25	MF	(England) Martin Garratt	4(2)	0	0	0	0	0	0	0	4(2)	0
25	MF	(England) Andy Porter	5	0	1	0	0	0	0	0	6	0
25	DF	(England) Leigh Bromby	10	1	0	0	0	0	1	0	11	1
27	FW	(England) Chris Greenacre	31	9	0	0	0	0	2	0	33	9
28	MF	(Republic of Ireland) Liam Lawrence	0(2)	0	0	0	0	0	0(1)	0	0(3)	0
30	DF	(England) Jonathan Fortune	4	0	0	0	0	0	0	0	4	0
30	FW	(Wales) Andy Evans	4(2)	0	0	0	0	0	0	0	4(2)	0
31	DF	(England) Gavin Bassinder	1(3)	0	0	0	0	0	0	0	1(3)	0
32	GK	(England) Bobby Mimms	5	0	0	0	0	0	0	0	5	0
–	–	Own goals	–	2	–	0	–	0	–	0	–	2
