= 2002–03 Northampton Town F.C. season =

Northampton Town
2002–03 season
- Chairman: Andrew Ellis
- Manager: Kevan Broadhurst (until January 2003); Terry Fenwick (January); Martin Wilkinson (from 24 February)
- Stadium: Sixfields Stadium
- Division Two: 24th
- FA Cup: Second round
- League Cup: First round
- League Trophy: Second round
- Top goalscorer: League: Marco Gabbiadini (12); All: Marco Gabbiadini (14)
- Highest home attendance: 5,906 vs Peterborough United
- Lowest home attendance: 2,336 vs Wigan Athletic

The 2002–03 season was Northampton Town's 106th season in their history and the third successive season in the Second Division. Alongside competing in Division Two, the club also participated in the FA Cup, League Cup and Football League Trophy.

== Players ==
As of match played 3 May 2003.

No.	Name	Position	Nat.	Place of birth	Date of birth (age)	Apps	Goals	Previous club	Date signed	Fee
Goalkeepers
1	Lee Harper	GK	(England)	Chelsea	30 October 1971 (aged 31)	34	0	Walsall	15 July 2002	Free
13	Nathan Abbey	GK	(England)	Islington	11 July 1978 (aged 24)	8	0	Chesterfield	2 August 2002	Free
24	Mark Bunn	GK	(England)	Kettering	16 November 1984 (aged 18)	0	0	Apprentice	21 August 2001	N/A
27	Glyn Thompson	GK	(England)	Telford	24 February 1981 (aged 22)	12	0	Fulham	27 March 2003	Free
Defenders
2	Chris Marsh	RB	(England)	Dudley	14 January 1970 (aged 33)	43	0	Wycombe Wanderers	6 September 2001	£10,000
3	Duncan Spedding	LB	(England)	Camberley	7 September 1977 (aged 25)	143	1	Southampton	14 July 1998	Free
4	Ian Sampson	CB	(England)	Wakefield	14 November 1968 (aged 34)	401	29	Sunderland	5 August 1994	£30,000
5	Richard Hope	CB	(England)	Stockton-on-Tees	22 June 1978 (aged 24)	153	7	Darlington	18 December 1998	Undisclosed
6	John Frain	LB	(England)	Birmingham	8 October 1968 (aged 34)	243	7	Birmingham City	Summer 1997	Free
16	Daryl Burgess	FB	(England)	Birmingham	24 January 1971 (aged 32)	69	2	West Bromwich Albion	27 June 2001	Free
21	Jerry Gill	RB	(England)	Clevedon	8 September 1970 (aged 32)	46	0	Birmingham City	11 November 2002	Free
25	Luke Chambers	RB	(England)	Kettering	28 September 1985 (aged 17)	1	0	Apprentice	26 April 2003	N/A
28	Paul Reid	CB	(England)	Carlisle	18 February 1982 (aged 21)	19	0	Rangers	30 December 2002	Loan
Midfielders
7	Paul McGregor	RW	(England)	Liverpool	17 December 1974 (aged 28)	71	7	Plymouth Argyle	8 June 2001	Free
8	Paul Harsley	CM	(England)	Scunthorpe	29 May 1978 (aged 24)	51	3	Halifax Town	13 June 2002	Free
11	Chris Carruthers	LM	(England)	Kettering	19 August 1983 (aged 19)	55	1	Apprentice	1 August 2000	N/A
14	Paul Rickers	RM	(England)	Pontefract	9 May 1975 (aged 27)	15	1	Oldham Athletic	3 July 2002	Free
15	Paul Trollope	CM	(Wales)	Swindon (ENG)	3 June 1972 (aged 30)	48	2	Coventry City	23 July 2002	Free
17	Greg Lincoln	CM	(England)	Cheshunt	23 March 1980 (aged 23)	12	0	Margate	6 June 2002	Free
20	Chris Hargreaves	CM	(England)	Cleethorpes	12 May 1972 (aged 30)	122	5	Plymouth Argyle	27 June 2000	Free
Forwards
9	Darryn Stamp	FW	(England)	Beverley	21 September 1978 (aged 24)	24	5	Scarborough	29 May 2002	£45,000
10	Marco Gabbiadini	FW	(England)	Nottingham	20 January 1968 (aged 35)	136	30	Darlington	27 June 2000	Free
19	Derek Asamoah	FW	(Ghana)	Accra	1 May 1981 (aged 22)	92	9	Slough Town	25 July 2001	Free
22	Steve Morison	FW	(England)	Enfield	29 August 1983 (aged 19)	16	1	Apprentice	27 August 2001	N/A
30	Lawrie Dudfield	FW	(England)	Southwark	7 May 1980 (aged 22)	10	1	Hull City	15 March 2003	Loan
31	Tom Youngs	FW	(England)	Bury St Edmunds	31 August 1979 (aged 23)	5	0	Cambridge United	15 March 2003	£50,000

== Competitions ==
=== Football League Division Two ===
==== League table ====
Pos	Team	Pld	W	D	L	GF	GA	GD	Pts	Promotion or relegation
20	Chesterfield	46	14	8	24	43	73	−30	50	
21	Cheltenham Town (R)	46	10	18	18	53	68	−15	48	Relegation to Football League Third Division
22	Huddersfield Town (R)	46	11	12	23	39	61	−22	45	Relegation to Football League Third Division
23	Mansfield Town (R)	46	12	8	26	66	97	−31	44	Relegation to Football League Third Division
24	Northampton Town (R)	46	10	9	27	40	79	−39	39	Relegation to Football League Third Division

Rules for classification: In the Football League goals scored (GF) takes precedence over goal difference (GD).
(R) Relegated

==== Results summary ====
Overall								Home						Away					
Pld	W	D	L	GF	GA	GD	Pts	W	D	L	GF	GA	GD	W	D	L	GF	GA	GD
46	10	9	27	40	79	−39	39	7	4	12	23	31	−8	3	5	15	17	48	−31

Last updated: 22 April 2020.
Source: 11v11.com

==== League position by match ====
Round	1	2	3	4	5	6	7	8	9	10	11	12	13	14	15	16	17	18	19	20	21	22	23	24	25	26	27	28	29	30	31	32	33	34	35	36	37	38	39	40	41	42	43	44	45	46
Ground	H	A	A	H	A	H	A	H	H	A	H	A	H	A	H	A	H	A	H	A	H	A	H	A	A	H	A	H	A	H	H	A	H	A	A	H	A	H	H	A	H	A	H	A	H	A
Result	D	D	W	L	L	W	L	D	W	L	W	D	L	L	L	L	W	W	W	L	L	L	L	D	W	L	L	L	D	L	D	L	L	L	L	W	D	W	L	L	L	L	L	L	D	L
Position	12	15	8	9	18	16	16	18	14	15	12	11	14	16	18	20	16	14	12	14	16	17	19	20	14	15	16	19	19	19	21	22	23	23	23	23	24	22	23	23	23	24	24	24	24	24

Source: 11v11.com
A = Away; H = Home; W = Win; D = Draw; L = Loss

==== Matches ====
Win Draw Loss

10 August 2002 1	Northampton Town	1–1	Crewe Alexandra	Northampton
15:00 BST	M.Gabbiadini 87'	Report	N.Sorvel 30'	Stadium: Sixfields Stadium; Attendance: 5,694; Referee: Trevor Parkes

13 August 2002 2	Wycombe Wanderers	1–1	Northampton Town	High Wycombe
19:45 BST	D.Currie 48'	Report	J.Forrester 69'	Stadium: Adams Park; Attendance: 5,993; Referee: Clive Wilkes

17 August 2002 3	Cardiff City	1–2	Northampton Town	Cardiff, Wales
15:00 BST	G.Kavanagh 15'	Report	M.Gabbiadini 10', 50'	Stadium: Ninian Park; Attendance: 13,321; Referee: Lee Cable

23 August 2002 4	Northampton Town	0–1	Blackpool	Northampton
19:45 BST		Report	J.Murphy 90'	Stadium: Sixfields Stadium; Attendance: 5,556; Referee: Phil Joslin

27 August 2002 5	Chesterfield	4–0	Northampton Town	Chesterfield
19:45 BST	G.Hurst 22', 90'; M.Hudson 28'; C.Brandon 42'	Report		Stadium: Saltergate; Attendance: 3,585; Referee: Scott Mathieson

31 August 2002 6	Northampton Town	1–0	Barnsley	Northampton
15:00 BST	I.Sampson (red card) 42'; P.McGregor 74'	Report		Stadium: Sixfields Stadium; Attendance: 5,004; Referee: Andy Hall

6 September 2002 7	Bristol City	3–0	Northampton Town	Bristol
19:45 BST	L.Peacock 7', 76'; S.Clist 87'	Report		Stadium: Ashton Gate Stadium; Attendance: 11,104; Referee: Paul Rejer

14 September 2002 8	Northampton Town	0–0	Huddersfield Town	Northampton
15:00 BST		Report		Stadium: Sixfields Stadium; Attendance: 4,679; Referee: Mark Warren

17 September 2002 9	Northampton Town	4–1	Colchester United	Northampton
19:45 BST	M.Gabbiadini 15', 45', 60'; A.One 23'	Report	I.Sampson 36' (o.g.)	Stadium: Sixfields Stadium; Attendance: 3,663; Referee: George Cain

21 September 2002 10	Swindon Town	2–0	Northampton Town	Swindon
15:00 BST	J.Jackson 31'; S.Parkin 79' (pen.)	Report	L.Harper (red card) 77'	Stadium: County Ground; Attendance: 4,719; Referee: Phil Prosser

28 September 2002 11	Northampton Town	2–0	Mansfield Town	Northampton
15:00 BST	M.Gabbiadini 3' (pen.); P.Trollope 80'	Report		Stadium: Sixfields Stadium; Attendance: 5,594; Referee: Mick Fletcher

5 October 2002 12	Plymouth Argyle	0–0	Northampton Town	Plymouth
15:00 BST		Report		Stadium: Home Park; Attendance: 8,530; Referee: Tony Bates

12 October 2002 13	Northampton Town	1–2	Brentford	Northampton
15:00 BST	D.Asamoah 90'	Report	I.Sonko 7'; R.Vine 25'	Stadium: Sixfields Stadium; Attendance: 5,739; Referee: Mark Cowburn

19 October 2002 14	Notts County	2–1	Northampton Town	Nottingham
15:00 BST	M.Stallard 50'; P.Heffernan 83'	Report	D.Asamoah 79'	Stadium: Meadow Lane; Attendance: 6,009; Referee: Eddie Ilderton

26 October 2002 15	Northampton Town	1–2	Cheltenham Town	Northampton
15:00 BST	J.Forrester 24'	Report	J.Alsop 31'; R.Forsyth 62'	Stadium: Sixfields Stadium; Attendance: 5,354; Referee: Matt Messias

29 October 2002 16	Oldham Athletic	4–0	Northampton Town	Oldham
19:45 GMT	W.Andrews 28'; C.Corazzin 61'; D.Eyres 71' (pen.); J.Eyre 84'	Report		Stadium: Boundary Park; Attendance: 5,512; Referee: Roy Pearson

2 November 2002 17	Northampton Town	3–0	Luton Town	Northampton
15:00 GMT	J.Forrester 9', 19'; M.Gabbiadini 50'	Report		Stadium: Sixfields Stadium; Attendance: 5,750; Referee: Paul Durkin

9 November 2002 18	Queens Park Rangers	0–1	Northampton Town	White City, London
15:00 GMT		Report	P.Trollope 61'	Stadium: Loftus Road; Attendance: 11,947; Referee: Mike Thorpe

23 November 2002 19	Northampton Town	3–0	Port Vale	Northampton
15:00 GMT	M.Gabbiadini 38', 56'; J.Forrester 89'	Report		Stadium: Sixfields Stadium; Attendance: 4,357; Referee: George Cain

30 November 2002 20	Wigan Athletic	1–0	Northampton Town	Wigan
15:00 GMT	N.Roberts 37'	Report	M.Gabbiadini (red card) 74'	Stadium: JJB Stadium; Attendance: 6,032; Referee: Alan Kaye

14 December 2002 21	Northampton Town	0–4	Tranmere Rovers	Northampton
15:00 GMT		Report	S.Haworth 10', 66'; R.Taylor 71'; A.Hay 76'	Stadium: Sixfields Stadium; Attendance: 4,268; Referee: Phil Crossley

20 December 2002 22	Stockport County	4–0	Northampton Town	Stockport
15:00 GMT	L.Beckett 23', 46', 60'; B.Burgess 77'	Report		Stadium: Edgeley Park; Attendance: 4,516; Referee: Brian Curson

26 December 2002 23	Northampton Town	0–1	Chesterfield	Northampton
15:00 GMT		Report	S.Bradley 88'	Stadium: Sixfields Stadium; Attendance: 5,282; Referee: Grant Hegley

28 December 2002 24	Peterborough United	0–0	Northampton Town	Peterborough
12:00 GMT		Report		Stadium: London Road; Attendance: 7,767; Referee: Michael Jones

1 January 2003 25	Barnsley	1–2	Northampton Town	Barnsley
15:00 GMT	C.Lumsdon 24'	Report	C.Lumsdon 45' (o.g.); D.Stamp 70'	Stadium: Oakwell; Attendance: 9,531; Referee: Lee Mason

4 January 2003 26	Northampton Town	0–5	Wycombe Wanderers	Northampton
15:00 GMT		Report	J.Dixon 8'; M.Simpson 45'; S.Roberts 46', 78', 82'	Stadium: Sixfields Stadium; Attendance: 4,679; Referee: Mike Ryan

18 January 2003 27	Blackpool	2–1	Northampton Town	Blackpool
15:00 GMT	R.Walker 77' (pen.); J.Murphy 90'	Report	D.Stamp 70'	Stadium: Bloomfield Road; Attendance: 5,646; Referee: Howard Webb

25 January 2003 28	Northampton Town	0–1	Peterborough United	Northampton
12:00 GMT	D.Stamp (red card) 69'	Report	A.Clarke 55'	Stadium: Sixfields Stadium; Attendance: 5,906; Referee: Paul Robinson

1 February 2003 29	Crewe Alexandra	3–3	Northampton Town	Crewe
15:00 GMT	S.Jones 39', 70'; D.Vaughan 41'	Report	M.Gabbiadini 45' (pen.); R.Hope 63'; D.Asamoah 81'	Stadium: Gresty Road; Attendance: 6,164; Referee: Paul Taylor

4 February 2003 30	Northampton Town	0–1	Cardiff City	Northampton
19:45 GMT		Report	R.Earnshaw 58'	Stadium: Sixfields Stadium; Attendance: 4,553; Referee: Ray Olivier
Note: Fixture was previously postponed on January 11, 2003 due to a frozen pitch.

8 February 2003 31	Northampton Town	1–1	Queens Park Rangers	Northampton
15:00 GMT	B.Rahim 16'	Report	P.Furlong 60'	Stadium: Sixfields Stadium; Attendance: 5,859; Referee: Ray Olivier

15 February 2003 32	Luton Town	3–2	Northampton Town	Luton
15:00 GMT	P.Hughes 26', 84'; K.Nicholls 58'	Report	D.Burgess 23'; R.Johnson 71' (pen.)	Stadium: Kenilworth Road; Attendance: 7,048; Referee: Keith Hill

22 February 2003 33	Northampton Town	1–2	Bristol City	Northampton
15:00 GMT	P.McGregor 45'	Report	M.Robins 12'; B.Tinnion 35'	Stadium: Sixfields Stadium; Attendance: 4,688; Referee: Alan Butler

1 March 2003 34	Huddersfield Town	2–0	Northampton Town	Huddersfield
15:00 GMT	S.Baldry 44'; M.Smith 45'	Report		Stadium: McAlpine Stadium; Attendance: 9,651; Referee: Michael Jones

4 March 2003 35	Colchester United	2–0	Northampton Town	Colchester
19:45 GMT	G.Williams 28'; S.McGleish 76'	Report		Stadium: Layer Road; Attendance: 3,408; Referee: David Crick

8 March 2003 36	Northampton Town	1–0	Swindon Town	Northampton
15:00 GMT	P.Harsley 61'	Report		Stadium: Sixfields Stadium; Attendance: 5,566; Referee: Tony Leake

15 March 2003 37	Cheltenham Town	1–1	Northampton Town	Cheltenham
15:00 GMT	M.Yates 60'	Report	P.Harsley 75'	Stadium: Whaddon Road; Attendance: 4,917; Referee: George Cain

18 March 2003 38	Northampton Town	2–0	Notts County	Northampton
19:45 GMT	D.Asamoah 24'; I.Sampson 82'	Report		Stadium: Sixfields Stadium; Attendance: 5,254; Referee: Phil Crossley

22 March 2003 39	Northampton Town	0–2	Oldham Athletic	Northampton
15:00 GMT		Report	W.Andrews 67', 89'	Stadium: Sixfields Stadium; Attendance: 5,646; Referee: Steve Tomlin

29 March 2003 40	Brentford	3–0	Northampton Town	Brentford, London
15:00 GMT	M.Somner 52'; M.Rowlands 77'; S.Hunt 90'	Report		Stadium: Griffin Park; Attendance: 5,354; Referee: Grant Hegley

4 April 2003 41	Northampton Town	0–2	Wigan Athletic	Northampton
19:45 BST		Report	N.Ellington 9'; A.Liddell 43' (pen.)	Stadium: Sixfields Stadium; Attendance: 5,822; Referee: Eddie Ilderton

12 April 2003 42	Port Vale	3–2	Northampton Town	Burslem
15:00 BST	M.Walsh 11'; P.Clarke 90'; A.Littlejohn 90'	Report	M.Gabbiadini 62'; L.Dudfield 89'	Stadium: Vale Park; Attendance: 4,209; Referee: Trevor Parkes

18 April 2003 43	Northampton Town	0–3	Stockport County	Northampton
19:45 BST		Report	A.Wilbraham 7', 24'; J.Goodwin 14'	Stadium: Sixfields Stadium; Attendance: 5,873; Referee: Alan Kaye

21 April 2003 44	Tranmere Rovers	4–0	Northampton Town	Birkenhead
15:00 BST	S.Nicholson 59' (pen.); S.Haworth 60'; I.Anderson 89'; A.Hay 90'	Report		Stadium: Prenton Park; Attendance: 7,348; Referee: Mark Clattenburg

26 April 2003 45	Northampton Town	2–2	Plymouth Argyle	Northampton
15:00 BST	D.Stamp 66'; S.Morison 72'	Report	D.Norris 19'; I.Stonebridge 55'	Stadium: Sixfields Stadium; Attendance: 5,063; Referee: Eddie Evans

3 May 2003 46	Mansfield Town	2–1	Northampton Town	Mansfield
15:00 BST	A.White 62'; L.Lawrence 77' (pem.)	Report	D.Stamp 66'	Stadium: Field Mill; Attendance: 3,928; Referee: Phil Prosser

=== FA Cup ===
16 November 2002 First round	Northampton Town	3–2	Boston United	Northampton
15:00 GMT	P.Harsley 10'; M.Gabbiadini 35'; D.Asamoah 68'	Report	T.Battersby 56' (pen.); A.Higgins 82'	Stadium: Sixfields Stadium; Attendance: 4,373; Referee: Steve Baines

7 December 2002 Second round	Cambridge United	2–2	Northampton Town	Cambridge
15:00 GMT	A.Tann 5', 45'	Report	D.Stamp 55'; C.Hargreaves 83'	Stadium: Abbey Stadium; Attendance: 5,076; Referee: Paul Rejer

17 December 2002 Second round (r)	Northampton Town	0–1	Cambridge United	Northampton
19:45 GMT		Report	O.Riza 79'	Stadium: Sixfields Stadium; Attendance: 4,591; Referee: Paul Rejer

=== League Cup ===
10 September 2002 First round	Northampton Town	0–1	Wigan Athletic	Northampton
19:45 BST		Report	J.Jarrett 31'	Stadium: Sixfields Stadium; Attendance: 2,336; Referee: Steve Baines

=== League Trophy ===
22 October 2002 First round (s)	Hereford United	3–4 (a.e.t.)	Northampton Town	Hereford
19:45 BST	C.Eribenne 6', 32'; P.Parry 82'	Report	J.Forrester 1' 96' (pen.); P.Rickers 11'; D.Asamoah 89'	Stadium: Edgar Street; Attendance: 1,087; Referee: Scott Mathieson
Note: Northampton Town won on the Golden Goal rule.

12 November 2002 Second round (s)	Northampton Town	2–4	Cambridge United	Northampton
19:45 GMT	C.Hargreaves 17'; M.Gabbiadini 27'	Report	D.Burgess 37' (o.g.); O.Riza 45', 50'; T.Youngs 72'	Stadium: Sixfields Stadium; Attendance: 2,497; Referee: Mark Cooper

=== Appearances, goals and cards ===
No.	Pos	Player	Division Two			FA Cup			League Cup			League Trophy			Total			Discipline	
No.	Pos	Player	Starts	Sub	Goals	Starts	Sub	Goals	Starts	Sub	Goals	Starts	Sub	Goals	Starts	Sub	Goals	Booked	Sent off (straight red)
1	GK	Lee Harper	31	–	–	2	–	–	–	–	–	–	1	–	33	1	–	–	1
2	RB	Chris Marsh	15	–	–	–	–	–	–	–	–	–	–	–	15	–	–	2	–
3	LB	Duncan Spedding	9	2	–	–	1	–	1	–	–	–	–	–	10	3	–	2	–
4	CB	Ian Sampson	31	2	1	3	–	–	–	–	–	2	–	–	36	2	1	9	1
5	CB	Richard Hope	17	6	1	1	2	–	–	–	–	1	1	–	19	9	1	5	–
6	LB	John Frain	13	1	–	–	–	–	–	–	–	1	–	–	14	1	–	–	–
7	RM	Paul McGregor	17	6	2	–	2	–	1	–	–	–	–	–	18	8	2	1	–
8	CM	Paul Harsley	41	4	2	3	–	1	1	–	–	1	1	–	46	5	3	1	–
9	ST	Darryn Stamp	12	10	4	1	1	1	–	–	–	–	–	–	13	11	5	2	1
10	ST	Marco Gabbiadini	33	8	12	3	–	1	1	–	–	2	–	1	39	8	14	7	1
11	LM	Chris Carruthers	26	7	–	3	–	–	1	–	–	–	1	–	30	8	–	1	–
13	GK	Nathan Abbey	4	1	–	–	–	–	1	–	–	2	–	–	7	1	–	–	1
14	RM	Paul Rickers	8	3	–	1	–	–	–	1	–	2	–	1	11	4	1	1	–
15	CM	Paul Trollope	41	–	2	3	–	–	1	–	–	2	–	–	47	–	2	7	–
16	RB	Daryl Burgess	24	1	1	2	–	–	1	–	–	1	–	–	28	1	1	6	1
17	CM	Greg Lincoln	5	7	–	–	–	–	–	–	–	–	–	–	5	7	–	–	–
19	ST	Derek Asamoah	20	22	4	2	1	1	–	1	–	2	–	1	24	24	6	2	–
20	CM	Chris Hargreaves	36	3	–	3	–	1	1	–	–	2	–	1	42	3	2	8	–
21	RB	Jerry Gill	41	–	–	2	–	–	1	–	–	2	–	–	46	–	–	5	–
22	ST	Steve Morison	4	9	1	–	–	–	–	–	–	–	2	–	4	11	1	–	–
23	MF	Danny Lowe	–	–	–	–	–	–	–	–	–	–	–	–	–	–	–	–	–
24	GK	Mark Bunn	–	–	–	–	–	–	–	–	–	–	–	–	–	–	–	–	–
25	RB	Luke Chambers	–	1	–	–	–	–	–	–	–	–	–	–	–	1	–	–	–
26	CM	Aaran Cavill	–	–	–	–	–	–	–	–	–	–	–	–	–	–	–	–	–
27	GK	Glyn Thompson	11	–	–	1	–	–	–	–	–	–	–	–	12	–	–	–	–
28	CB	Paul Reid	19	–	–	–	–	–	–	–	–	–	–	–	19	–	–	3	–
29	DF	Adam Barradell	–	–	–	–	–	–	–	–	–	–	–	–	–	–	–	–	–
30	ST	Lawrie Dudfield	8	2	1	–	–	–	–	–	–	–	–	–	8	2	1	–	–
31	ST	Tom Youngs	5	–	–	–	–	–	–	–	–	–	–	–	5	–	–	–	–
Players no longer at the club:
18	ST	Jamie Forrester	18	7	5	3	–	–	1	–	–	2	–	2	24	7	7	–	–
18	CM	Brent Rahim	6	–	1	–	–	–	–	–	–	–	–	–	6	–	1	1	–
23	ST	Armand One	6	–	1	–	–	–	–	1	–	–	–	–	6	1	1	–	–
29	LM	Andy Turner	–	3	–	–	–	–	–	–	–	–	–	–	–	3	–	–	–
30	CM	Richard Johnson	5	1	1	–	–	–	–	–	–	–	–	–	5	1	1	2	–
