= 1992–93 Aston Villa F.C. season =

English football club season

Aston Villa
1992–93 season
- Chairman: Doug Ellis
- Manager: Ron Atkinson
- Stadium: Villa Park
- Premier League: 2nd
- FA Cup: Fourth round
- League Cup: Fourth round
- Top goalscorer: League: Dean Saunders (13); All: Dean Saunders (17)
- Highest home attendance: 39,063 vs. Manchester United; 7 Nov 1992, Premier League
- Lowest home attendance: 17,120 vs. Chelsea; 5 Sep 1992, Premier League
- Average home league attendance: 29,594
Home colours	Away colours	Third colours

The 1992–93 English football season was Aston Villa's founding season in the Premier League. It was Villa's 118th professional season, their 82nd season in top flight and their 6th consecutive season in the top tier. Villa scored the Goal of the Month four times.

Aston Villa spent most of the season challenging for the title in the newly formed league and were top of the league with six games left to play, but were eventually overhauled by manager Ron Atkinson's old club Manchester United.

There were debut appearances for Dean Saunders (112), Ray Houghton (95), Dave Farrell (6), and Frank McAvennie (3). In January 1993, backup Goalkeeper Les Sealey was allowed a free transfer and would return to old club Manchester United.

Kit Supplier	Sponsor
Umbro	Mita Copiers

== Premier League ==
Pos	Team	Pld	W	D	L	GF	GA	GD	Pts	Qualification or relegation
1	Manchester United (C)	42	24	12	6	67	31	+36	84	Qualification for the Champions League first round
2	Aston Villa	42	21	11	10	57	40	+17	74	Qualification for the UEFA Cup first round (Note: Since League Cup winners Arsenal had qualified for the UEFA Cup Winners Cup by also winning the FA Cup, the UEFA Cup berth for the League Cup reverted to the league and was awarded to Norwich City. England was considered for an extra slot for the UEFA Cup after the 1993 Polish football scandal, but another one was given to Scotland, and it was thought excessive to give both two slots to Great Britain, and the extra place was awarded to Hungary.)
3	Norwich City	42	21	9	12	61	65	−4	72	Qualification for the UEFA Cup first round
4	Blackburn Rovers	42	20	11	11	68	46	+22	71	
5	Queens Park Rangers	42	17	12	13	63	55	+8	63	

Source: Premier League
Rules for classification: 1) points; 2) goal difference; 3) number of goals scored.
(C) Champions
Notes:

Matches

15 August 1992 1	Ipswich Town	1–1	Aston Villa	Ipswich
15:00	Johnson 31'	Report	Atkinson 84'	Stadium: Portman Road; Attendance: 16,818; Referee: Alf Buksh
Note: Villa began their season against the last champions of the old 2nd Division, Ipswich Town in front of a packed crowd at Portman Road and came away with a point after a late goal by Dalian Atkinson cancelled out Gavin Johnson's first half opener.

19 August 1992 2	Aston Villa	1–1	Leeds United	Birmingham
20:00	Atkinson 77'	Report	Speed 84'	Stadium: Villa Park; Attendance: 29,151; Referee: Keith Hackett
Note: On a Wednesday nigh, Villa were back in front of a home crowd at Villa Park to face the reigning Division 1 champions Leeds United and picked up another point with another Atkinson goal.

22 August 1992 3	Aston Villa	1–1	Southampton	Birmingham
15:00	Atkinson 64'	Report	Adams 79'	Stadium: Villa Park; Attendance: 17,894; Referee: Kelvin Morton
Note: Villa faced Ian Branfoot's Southampton and it was three from three for Atkinson, and three draws from three for Villa.

25 August 1992 4	Everton	1–0	Aston Villa	Liverpool
19:30	Johnston 88'	Report		Stadium: Goodison Park; Attendance: 22,372; Referee: Martin Bodenham
Note: Another mid-week game, this time at Goodison Park brought Villa's first loss of the season, as a late Mo Johnston strike gave Everton all three points.

29 August 1992 5	Sheffield United	0–2	Aston Villa	Sheffield
15:00		Report	Parker 2' 86'	Stadium: Bramall Lane; Attendance: 18,733; Referee: Roger Milford
Note: On to Bramall Lane and Villa's first win of the season as two goals from Garry Parker and a first clean sheet of the season for Nigel Spink lifted Villa to 15th at the end of the month.

2 September 1992 6	Aston Villa	1–3	Chelsea	Birmingham
19:45	Richardson 30'	Report	Fleck 40'; Newton 42'; Wise 57'	Stadium: Villa Park; Attendance: 19,125; Referee: Peter Foakes

5 September 1992 7	Aston Villa	3–0	Crystal Palace	Birmingham
15:00	Yorke 18'; Staunton 42'; Froggatt 72'	Report		Stadium: Villa Park; Attendance: 17,120; Referee: Ken Redfern
Note: A poor performance and a home loss to Chelsea was quickly forgotten after Villa hit three with no reply against Crystal Palace.

13 September 1992 8	Leeds United	1–1	Aston Villa	Leeds
16:00	Hodge 85'	Report	Parker 19'	Stadium: Elland Road; Attendance: 27,817; Referee: Joe Worrall
Note: There were comings and goings, Frank McAcvennie's short stay at the club ended and he departed on a free. To replace him, Villa spent a club record £2.3m to sign Liverpool's star striker Dean Saunders. Saunders would not be in place in time as Villa faced Leeds for the second time in a month, with the outcome the same, a 1–1 draw.

19 September 1992 9	Aston Villa	4–2	Liverpool	Birmingham
15:00	Saunders 44' 66'; Atkinson 54'; Parker 78'	Report	Walters 43'; Rosenthal 84'	Stadium: Villa Park; Attendance: 37,863; Referee: Philip Don
Note: Dean Saunders would make his debut at home to old club Liverpool, and couldn't have hoped for a better debut, hitting a brace as Villa ran out 4–2 winners.

26 September 1992 10	Middlesbrough	2–3	Aston Villa	Middlesbrough
15:00	Slaven 62'; McGrath 86' (o.g.)	Report	Saunders 22' 74'; Atkinson 71'	Stadium: Ayresome Park; Attendance: 20,905; Referee: David Elleray
Note: Next, Villa were in the north east taking on new boys Middlesbrough at Ayresome Park. Saunders made it four in two league games as Villa ran out 3–2 victors.

3 October 1992 11	Wimbledon	2–3	Aston Villa	London
15:00	Newhouse 34'; Clarke 90'	Report	Saunders 5' 29'; Atkinson 77'	Stadium: Selhurst Park; Attendance: 6,849; Referee: Stephen Lodge
Note: Dean Saunders fine start to life at Villa continued with a third consecutive league brace away at Wimbledon, but the game would be remembered for the brilliant solo run and chipped finish that would see Dalian Atkinson scoop the Goal of the Season, Villa taking the spoils in a 3–2 win.

19 October 1992 12	Aston Villa	0–0	Blackburn Rovers	Birmingham
19:45		Report		Stadium: Villa Park; Attendance: 30,398; Referee: Howard King
Note: A dour goalless draw at home to Blackburn Rovers saw Villa fourth in the table, 6 points off shock early runners Norwich City.

24 October 1992 13	Oldham Athletic	1–1	Aston Villa	Oldham
15:00	Olney 19'	Report	Atkinson 81'	Stadium: Boundary Park; Attendance: 13,457; Referee: Rodger Gifford
Note: There was another single point taken at Boundary Park, Dalian Atkinson's goal sharing the spoils with Oldham Athletic after an early goal by Villa old boy Ian Olney.

1 November 1992 14	Aston Villa	2–0	Queens Park Rangers	Birmingham
15:00	Saunders 43'; Atkinson 79'	Report		Stadium: Villa Park; Attendance: 20,140; Referee: Mike Peck
Note: Villa started November against Queens Park Rangers at home, winning 2–0 thanks to a goal a piece for Villa's two forwards, Atkinson and Saunders. 7 league goals each, Villa remained Fourth, 3 points off new leaders Blackburn.

7 November 1992 15	Aston Villa	1–0	Manchester United	Birmingham
15:00	Atkinson 12'	Report		Stadium: Villa Park; Attendance: 39,063; Referee: David Elleray
Note: Having met in the League Cup, Villa faced Manchester United at home again, this time in the league, with the outcome the same, a 1–0 victory for Villa.

21 November 1992 16	Tottenham Hotspur	0–0	Aston Villa	London
15:00		Report		Stadium: White Hart Lane; Attendance: 32,852; Referee: Jim Borrett
Note: A third straight clean sheet for Nigel Spink at White Hart Lane but his opposite number Erik Thorstvedt had an equally good day at the office, 0–0 against Spurs.

28 November 1992 17	Aston Villa	2–3	Norwich City	Birmingham
15:00	Houghton 45'; Parker 46'	Report	Phillips 17'; Beckford 30'; Sutch 49'	Stadium: Villa Park; Attendance: 28,837; Referee: Alf Buksh
Note: Next was the visit of high flying Norwich City, and goals from Ray Houghton and Garry Parker could not stop Villa falling to a first home loss since Chelsea at the start of September, goals for Phillips, Beckford and Sutch winning the points to the Canaries.

5 December 1992 18	Sheffield Wednesday	1–2	Aston Villa	Sheffield
15:00	Bright 26'	Report	Atkinson 19' 67'	Stadium: Hillsborough; Attendance: 29,964; Referee: Robbie Hart
Note: Two goals from Dalian Atkinson at Hillsborough saw Villa back to winning ways at Sheffield Wednesday.

12 December 1992 19	Aston Villa	2–1	Nottingham Forest	Birmingham
15:00	Regis 33'; McGrath 47'	Report	Keane 9'	Stadium: Villa Park; Attendance: 29,015; Referee: Joe Worrall
Note: And another 2–1 win at home to Brian Clough's strugglers Nottingham Forest saw Villa up to Second.

19 December 1992 20	Manchester City	1–1	Aston Villa	Manchester
15:00	Flitcroft 58'	Report	Parker 34'	Stadium: Maine Road; Attendance: 23,525; Referee: Ray Bigger
Note: Having been knocked out of the Coca-cola Cup, back in the league, Villa faltered with a 1–1 draw at Maine Road against Manchester City.

26 December 1992 21	Coventry City	3–0	Aston Villa	Coventry
12:00	Quinn 52' 55'; Rosario 59'	Report		Stadium: Highfield Road; Attendance: 24,245; Referee: Roger Dilkes
Note: A 3–0 humbling against Coventry City on Boxing Day, Micky Quinn terrorising Villa's normally resilient defence.

28 December 1992 22	Aston Villa	1–0	Arsenal	Birmingham
19:30	Saunders 45' (pen.)	Report		Stadium: Villa Park; Attendance: 35,170; Referee: Martin Bodenham
Note: Villa ended the year in winning ways, a Dean Saunders penalty enough to see them take the points at home to Arsenal.

9 January 1993 23	Liverpool	1–2	Aston Villa	Liverpool
15:00	Barnes 42'	Report	Parker 54'; Saunders 64'	Stadium: Anfield; Attendance: 40,826; Referee: Keith Hackett
Note: Villa headed to Anfield next and Dean Saunders made it 3 in 2 against his former employers as Liverpool were beat 2–1.

17 January 1993 24	Aston Villa	5–1	Middlesbrough	Birmingham
16:00	Parker 26'; McGrath 32'; Yorke 44'; Saunders 58'; Teale 68'	Report	Hignett 82'	Stadium: Villa Park; Attendance: 19,997; Referee: Keith Cooper
Note: Villa turned on the style in a thrilling Sunday afternoon encounter against Middlesbrough, goals from Parker, McGrath, Yorke, Saunders and Teale as Villa won 5–1.

27 January 1993 25	Aston Villa	3–1	Sheffield United	Birmingham
19:45	McGrath 54'; Saunders 58'; Richardson 89'	Report	Deane 74'	Stadium: Villa Park; Attendance: 20,266; Referee: Keith Burge
Note: Villa made it four league wins on the bounce, sweeping Dave Bassett's Sheffield United aside with a convincing 3–1 win.

30 January 1993 26	Southampton	2–0	Aston Villa	Southampton
15:00	Banger 39'; Dowie 63'	Report		Stadium: The Dell; Attendance: 19,087; Referee: Kevin Wright
Note: Villa ended the month with a poor performance at the Dell, as Southampton ran out 2–0 victors.

6 February 1993 27	Aston Villa	2–0	Ipswich Town	Birmingham
15:00	Yorke 32'; Saunders 42'	Report		Stadium: Villa Park; Attendance: 25,395; Referee: Paul Durkin
Note: Having been knocked out of the FA Cup, it was back to Villa Park in the league and a 2–0 win against Ipswich Town saw Villa keeping pace with leaders Manchester United, just a point separating the two.

10 February 1993 28	Crystal Palace	1–0	Aston Villa	London
20:00	Bowry 9'	Report		Stadium: Selhurst Park; Attendance: 12,270; Referee: Ken Redfern
Note: A Bobby Bowry goal made it three losses out of four on the road in the league however, Crystal Palace 1–0 winners.

13 February 1993 29	Chelsea	0–1	Aston Villa	London
15:00		Report	Houghton 22'	Stadium: Stamford Bridge; Attendance: 20,081; Referee: Mike Peck
Note: Villa would be back in London three days later. A 1–0 win at Chelsea, Houghton with the lone goal.

20 February 1993 30	Aston Villa	2–1	Everton	Birmingham
15:00	Cox 12'; Barrett 18'	Report	Beardsley 24' (pen.)	Stadium: Villa Park; Attendance: 32,931; Referee: Paul Ward
Note: Everton at home next and goals for two of Villa's right backs, Neil Cox, and Earl Barrett, a makeshift central midfielder for the day, Villa the victors 2–1.

27 February 1993 31	Aston Villa	1–0	Wimbledon	Birmingham
15:00	Yorke 79'	Report		Stadium: Villa Park; Attendance: 34,496; Referee: Stephen Lodge
Note: Dwight Yorke was struggling to replicate his top scoring form from last season but did get his 5th of the campaign against Wimbledon in a 1–0 win.

10 March 1993 32	Aston Villa	0–0	Tottenham Hotspur	Birmingham
19:45		Report		Stadium: Villa Park; Attendance: 37,727; Referee: Keith Hackett
Note: Villa would open March with back-to-back draws. First, Tottenham Hotspur came to Villa Park but the game was ultimately a tame goalless tie.

14 March 1993 33	Manchester United	1–1	Aston Villa	Greater Manchester
13:00	Hughes 57'	Report	Staunton 63'	Stadium: Old Trafford; Attendance: 36,163; Referee: Allan Gunn
Note: Next, Villa headed to Ron Atkinson's old stomping ground Old Trafford, and a thrilling encounter between the Premier League's top two sides. United's Welsh powerhouse Mark Hughes equalised - but that was only after a wonderful long range strike from Villa's Irish left-back Steve Staunton, who opened with the goal three minutes before. Nothing to separate the two sides.

20 March 1993 34	Aston Villa	2–0	Sheffield Wednesday	Birmingham
15:00	Yorke 2' 56'	Report		Stadium: Villa Park; Attendance: 38,024; Referee: Roger Milford
Note: Back to Villa Park, and a brace for Dwight Yorke gave Villa the points at home to Trevor Francis's Sheffield Wednesday.

24 March 1993 35	Norwich City	1–0	Aston Villa	Norwich
19:45	Polston 81'	Report		Stadium: Carrow Road; Attendance: 19,528; Referee: Robbie Hart
Note: Villa would end the month with a loss on the road to Norwich City, defender John Polston with the only goal of the game.

4 April 1993 36	Nottingham Forest	0–1	Aston Villa	West Bridgford
15:00		Report	McGrath 63'	Stadium: City Ground; Attendance: 26,742; Referee: Keith Burge
Note: A goal from Paul McGrath gave Villa the points at the City Ground in a well-fought 1–0 win.

10 April 1993 37	Aston Villa	0–0	Coventry City	Birmingham
15:00		Report		Stadium: Villa Park; Attendance: 38,543; Referee: Allan Gunn
Note: Villa failed to find a way through Coventry at Villa Park, drawing the tie 0–0.

12 April 1993 38	Arsenal	0–1	Aston Villa	London
15:00		Report	Daley 68'	Stadium: Highbury; Attendance: 27,123; Referee: Gerald Ashby
Note: Tony Daley hit the winner at Highbury against Arsenal, and Villa headed into the final four games of the season still just a point off Manchester United.

18 April 1993 39	Aston Villa	3–1	Manchester City	Birmingham
14:30	Saunders 47'; Parker 67' (pen.); Houghton 89'	Report	Quinn 34'	Stadium: Villa Park; Attendance: 33,108; Referee: Philip Don
Note: A 3–1 win at home to Manchester City kept United looking over their shoulder.

21 April 1993 40	Blackburn Rovers	3–0	Aston Villa	Blackburn
19:45	Newell 9' 40'; Gallacher 15'	Report		Stadium: Ewood Park; Attendance: 15,127; Referee: Joe Worrall
Note: Villa headed to Ewood Park in high spirits. However, Blackburn hit Villa for three, and United beat Palace, leaving a 4-point gap, with 6 to play for.

2 May 1993 41	Aston Villa	0–1	Oldham Athletic	Birmingham
16:00		Report	Henry 30'	Stadium: Villa Park; Attendance: 37,427; Referee: David Allison
Note: Relegation placed Oldham came to Villa Park at the start of May, and Villa were expected to win extending the challenge back to Manchester United, who were to face Blackburn on the Monday night. However, Oldham were in a fight of their own, and a goal from midfielder Nick Henry gave Oldham the 1–0 win, taking their survival battle to the final day and crowning United the inaugural Premier League Champions.

9 May 1993 42	Queens Park Rangers	2–1	Aston Villa	London
14:00	Ferdinand 67'; Allen 78'	Report	Daley 38'	Stadium: Loftus Road; Attendance: 18,904; Referee: Paul Durkin
Note: Villa would round off the season at Loftus Road, losing 2–1 to Queens Park Rangers. Aston Villa would finish the season in 2nd place, 10 points off United, but qualification for next seasons UEFA Cup assured.

Round	1	2	3	4	5	6	7	8	9	10	11	12	13	14	15	16	17	18	19	20	21	22	23	24	25	26	27	28	29	30	31	32	33	34	35	36	37	38	39	40	41	42
Venue	A	H	H	A	A	H	H	A	H	A	A	H	A	H	H	A	H	A	H	A	A	H	A	H	H	A	H	A	H	H	H	H	A	H	A	A	H	A	H	A	H	A
Result	D	D	D	L	W	L	W	D	W	W	W	D	D	W	W	D	L	W	W	D	L	W	W	W	W	L	W	L	W	W	W	D	D	W	L	W	D	W	W	L	L	L
Position	8	14	14	18	15	15	10	10	7	6	5	4	6	4	4	4	4	3	2	2	4	3	1	1	2	3	2	2	1	1	1	1	2	2	1	1	2	2	2	2	2	2

Source: Premier League
A = Away; H = Home; W = Win; D = Draw; L = Loss; P = Postponed

== FA Cup ==
2 January 1993 R3	Aston Villa	1–1	Bristol Rovers	Birmingham
15:00	N. Cox 38'	Report	M. Browning 72'	Stadium: Villa Park; Attendance: 27,040; Referee: Bob Nixon
Note: The third round of this seasons FA Cup drew Villa at home to Malcolm Allison's Bristol Rovers. Young full back Neil Cox gave Villa a first half lead, but Rovers equalled the tie through Marcus Browning. A replay at Twerton Park to decide Villa's fate.

20 January 1993 R3R	Bristol Rovers	0–3	Aston Villa	Bristol
20:00		Report	D. Saunders 25' 75'; R. Houghton 83'	Stadium: Twerton Park; Attendance: 8,880; Referee: Martin Bodenham
Note: Back to the FA Cup and Villa hit three against Bristol Rovers to advance to the next round. They wouldn't have to wait long for that match.

23 January 1993 R4	Aston Villa	1–1	Wimbledon	Birmingham
15:00	D. Yorke 3'	Report	G. Elkins 35'	Stadium: Villa Park; Attendance: 21,088; Referee: Ken Redfern
Note: Three days later, Villa faced Wimbledon at home in Round 4. Dwight Yorke's strike after 3 minutes cancelled out by Gary Elkins meant a replay at Selhurst Park.

3 February 1993 R4R	Wimbledon	0–0 (6–5 p)	Aston Villa	London
20:00		Report		Stadium: Selhurst Park; Attendance: 8,048; Referee: Ken Redfern
	Penalties
	A cold night in South London and a 0–0 draw in Villa's replay at Wimbledon. After 120 minutes and nothing to separate the sides, a shootout was needed. A penalty masterclass from all but one. Villa captain Kevin Richardson missing the decisive kick and Villa were out.: J. Fashanu (penalty scored); N. Ardley (penalty scored); B. McAllister (penalty scored); V. Jones (penalty scored); G. Dobbs (penalty scored); R. Joseph (penalty scored)		(penalty scored) G. Parker; (penalty scored) D. Saunders; (penalty scored) S. Staunton; (penalty scored) D. Yorke; (penalty scored) S. Teale; (penalty missed) K. Richardson

== League Cup ==
23 September 1992 R2 L1	Oxford United	1–2	Aston Villa	Oxford
19:45	J. Beauchamp 89'	Report	P. McGrath 52'; S. Teale 72'	Stadium: Manor Ground; Attendance: 8,837; Referee: Roger Wiseman
Note: The Manor Ground next in the Coca-Cola Cup 2nd round, 1st leg against second tier Oxford United. Centre-backs Paul McGrath and Shaun Teale grabbed a goal each. Joey Beauchamp pulled one back for Oxford to make it a less straightforward tie at Villa Park a fortnight later.

7 October 1992 R2 L2	Aston Villa	2–1	Oxford United	Birmingham
19:45	D. Atkinson 11'; K. Richardson 90'	Report	N. Cusack 88'	Stadium: Villa Park; Attendance: 19,808; Referee: Bob Nixon
Note: Oxford United came to Villa Park for the second leg in the Coca-Cola Cup and goals from Dalian Atkinson and skipper Kevin Richardson were enough to see Villa progress, 2–1 on the night, 4–2 on aggregate.

28 October 1992 R3	Aston Villa	1–0	Manchester United	Birmingham
19:45	D. Saunders 75'	Report		Stadium: Villa Park; Attendance: 35,964; Referee: Philip Don
Note: The third round of the League Cup next and Villa playing host to Alex Ferguson's Manchester United. Dean Saunders goal was the difference as Villa progressed to Round 4.

2 December 1992 R4	Aston Villa	2–2	Ipswich Town	Birmingham
19:45	D. Saunders 65'; D. Atkinson 77'	Report	C. Kiwomya 74' 83'	Stadium: Villa Park; Attendance: 21,545; Referee: John Martin
Note: Ipswich Town at home in Round 4 of the League Cup and Atkinson and Saunders each getting a goal and an assist. A brace from Ipswich forward Chris Kiwomya left the tie at 2–2. A Replay at Portman Road would be needed.

15 December 1992 R4R	Ipswich Town	1–0	Aston Villa	Ipswich
19:45	C. Kiwomya 57'	Report		Stadium: Portman Road; Attendance: 19,196; Referee: Mike James
Note: The Replay at Portman Road and a solitary Chris Kiwomya strike saw Ipswich through 1–0 and Villa out at the last 16.

== Squad ==
#	Pos	Name	Nat	Place of birth	Date of birth (age)	Signed from	Date signed	Fee	Apps	Gls
Goalkeepers
-	GK	Nigel Spink	(England)	Chelmsford	8 August 1958 (aged 33)	Chelmsford City	4 January 1977	£4,000	381	0
-	GK	Mark Bosnich	(Australia)	(Australia) Liverpool, Sydney	13 January 1972 (aged 20)	(Australia) Sydney Croatia	28 February 1992	Free transfer	1	0
-	GK	Les Sealey	(England)	Bethnal Green	29 September 1957 (aged 34)	Manchester United	19 July 1991	Free transfer	22	0
-	GK	Michael Oakes	(England)	Northwich	30 October 1973 (aged 18)	Academy	1 July 1991	—N/a	0	0
Defenders
-	RB	Earl Barrett	(England)	Rochdale	28 April 1967 (aged 25)	Oldham Athletic	25 February 1992	£1,700,000	13	0
-	LB	Steve Staunton	(Republic of Ireland)	Dundalk	19 January 1969 (aged 23)	Liverpool	7 August 1991	£1,100,000	43	4
-	CB	Paul McGrath	(Republic of Ireland)	(England) Greenford	4 December 1959 (aged 32)	Manchester United	3 August 1989	£400,000	125	2
-	CB	Shaun Teale	(England)	Southport	10 March 1964 (aged 28)	Bournemouth	25 July 1991	£300,000	49	1
-	CB	Neil Cox	(England)	Scunthorpe	8 October 1971 (aged 20)	Scunthorpe United	12 February 1991	£400,000	7	0
-	LB	Bryan Small	(England)	Birmingham	15 November 1971 (aged 20)	Academy	1 July 1990	—N/a	11	0
-	CB	Ugo Ehiogu	(England)	Hackney	3 November 1972 (aged 19)	West Bromwich Albion	12 July 1991	£40,000	9	0
-	RB	Dariusz Kubicki	(Poland)	Kożuchów	6 June 1963 (aged 29)	(Poland) Legia Warsaw	28 August 1991	£200,000	29	0
Midfielders
-	CM	Kevin Richardson (c)	(England)	Newcastle upon Tyne	4 December 1962 (aged 29)	(Spain) Real Sociedad	6 August 1991	£450,000	49	0
-	CM	Ray Houghton	(Republic of Ireland)	(Scotland) Glasgow	9 January 1962 (aged 30)	Liverpool	28 July 1992	£900,000	-	-
-	CM	Garry Parker	(England)	Oxford	7 September 1965 (aged 26)	Nottingham Forest	29 November 1991	£650,000	30	2
-	AM	Stefan Beinlich	(Germany)	East Berlin	13 January 1972 (aged 20)	(Germany) Bergmann-Borsig	1 October 1991	£100,000	2	0
-	AM	Matthias Breitkreutz	(Germany)	Crivitz	12 May 1971 (aged 21)	(Germany) Bergmann-Borsig	1 October 1991	£100,000	8	0
-	CM	David Farrell	(England)	Birmingham	11 November 1971 (aged 20)	Redditch United	6 January 1992	£45,000	0	0
-	CM	Mark Blake	(England)	Birmingham	16 September 1970 (aged 21)	Academy	1 July 1989	—N/a	30	3
-	AM	Henrik Larsen	(Denmark)	Kongens Lyngby	7 May 1966 (aged 26)	(Italy) Pisa	1 January 1993	Loan	-	-
Forwards
-	CF	Dean Saunders	(Wales)	Swansea	21 June 1964 (aged 28)	Liverpool	10 September 1992	£2,300,000	-	-
-	CF	Dwight Yorke	(Trinidad and Tobago)	Canaan	3 November 1971 (aged 20)	(Trinidad and Tobago) Signal Hill	19 December 1989	£120,000	54	19
-	CF	Dalian Atkinson	(England)	Shrewsbury	21 March 1968 (aged 24)	(Spain) Real Sociedad	11 July 1991	£1,600,000	16	1
-	LW	Steve Froggatt	(England)	Lincoln	5 March 1973 (aged 19)	Academy	1 July 1991	—N/a	16	1
-	CF	Cyrille Regis	(England)	(French Guiana) Maripasoula	9 February 1958 (aged 34)	Coventry City	2 July 1991	Free transfer	46	11
-	RW	Tony Daley	(England)	Birmingham	18 October 1967 (aged 24)	Academy	1 January 1986	—N/a	224	32
-	CF	Frank McAvennie	(Scotland)	Glasgow	22 November 1959 (aged 32)	West Ham United	1 July 1992	Free transfer	-	-
-	CF	Martin Carruthers	(England)	Nottingham	7 August 1972 (aged 19)	Academy	1 July 1990	—N/a	0	0

Note: Stats and ages are correct as of July 1, 1992.

=== Transfers ===
Transferred in

Date	Pos	Player	From	Fee
1 July 1992	CF	(Scotland) Frank McAvennie	West Ham United	Free transfer
28 July 1992	RM	(Republic of Ireland) Ray Houghton	Liverpool	£900,000
10 September 1992	CF	(Wales) Dean Saunders	Liverpool	£2,300,000
21 September 1992	LM	(Republic of Ireland) Gareth Farrelly	(Republic of Ireland) Home Farm	£30,000
				£3,230,000

Record

Loaned in

Date	Pos	Player	From	Loan End
1 January 1993	CM	(Denmark) Henrik Larsen	Pisa	31 May 1993

Transferred out

Date	Pos	Player	To	Fee
1 July 1992	RW	Nigel Callaghan	Retired	—N/a
1 July 1992	CB	(Denmark) Kent Nielsen	(Denmark) AGF	Free transfer
7 July 1992	CF	Ian Olney	Oldham Athletic	£700,000
9 September 1992	CF	(Scotland) Frank McAvennie	(Northern Ireland) Cliftonville	Free transfer
6 January 1993	GK	Les Sealey	Manchester United	Free transfer
				£700,000

Loaned out

Date	Pos	Player	To	Loan End
2 October 1992	GK	Les Sealey	Birmingham City	5 January 1993
31 October 1992	CF	Martin Carruthers	Hull City	31 January 1993
8 November 1992	CM	Lee Williams	Shrewsbury Town	31 May 1993
25 January 1993	CM	David Farrell	Scunthorpe United	25 February 1993

Overall transfer activity

Expenditure
▼£3,230,000

Income
▲£700,000

Balance
▼£2,530,000

=== Statistics ===
Total

#	Pos	Nat	Player	Sqd	App	FXI	Sub	Unu	Gls	Ast	O.G.	C.S.	Yellow card	(yellow card) (yellow-red card)	Red card	Substituted on	Substituted off	
-	GK	(Australia)	Mark Bosnich	31	18	18	-	13	-	-	-	11	-	-	-	-	-	1650'
-	GK	(England)	Michael Oakes	5	-	-	-	5	-	-	-	-	-	-	-	-	-	-
-	GK	(England)	Les Sealey	11	-	-	-	11	-	-	-	-	-	-	-	-	-	-
-	GK	(England)	Nigel Spink	48	33	33	-	15	-	1	-	10	-	-	-	-	-	2970'
-	RB	(England)	Earl Barrett	51	51	51	-	-	1	2	-	-	3	-	-	-	-	4620'
-	CB	(England)	Neil Cox	29	20	9	11	9	2	2	-	-	1	-	-	11	-	1019'
-	CB	(England)	Ugo Ehiogu	11	5	2	3	6	-	1	-	-	-	-	-	3	1	220'
-	RB	(Poland)	Dariusz Kubicki	3	1	1	-	2	-	-	-	-	-	-	-	-	-	90'
-	CB	(Republic of Ireland)	Paul McGrath	50	50	50	-	-	5	2	1	-	2	-	-	-	1	4522'
-	LB	(England)	Bryan Small	22	15	11	4	7	-	1	-	-	-	-	-	4	2	1043'
-	LB	(Republic of Ireland)	Steve Staunton	51	51	51	-	-	2	9	-	-	2	-	-	-	2	4536'
-	CB	(England)	Shaun Teale	47	47	47	-	-	2	-	-	-	7	-	-	-	1	4241'
-	AM	(Germany)	Stefan Beinlich	11	7	1	8	2	-	-	-	-	-	-	-	6	-	178'
-	CM	(England)	Mark Blake	2	1	-	1	1	-	-	-	-	-	-	-	1	-	2'
-	AM	(Germany)	Matthias Breitkreutz	6	4	2	2	2	-	-	-	-	-	-	-	2	2	196'
-	CM	(England)	David Farrell	3	2	1	1	1	-	-	-	-	-	-	-	1	1	74'
-	CM	(Republic of Ireland)	Ray Houghton	48	48	48	-	-	4	8	-	-	1	-	-	-	2	4334'
-	AM	(Denmark)	Henrik Larsen	-	-	-	-	-	-	-	-	-	-	-	-	-	-	-
-	CM	(England)	Garry Parker	46	46	46	-	-	9	1	-	-	-	-	-	-	13	4023'
-	CM	(England)	Kevin Richardson	51	51	51	-	-	3	3	-	-	4	-	-	-	1	4584'
-	CF	(England)	Dalian Atkinson	32	32	32	-	-	13	3	-	-	1	-	-	-	5	2770'
-	CF	(England)	Martin Carruthers	1	1	-	1	-	-	-	-	-	-	-	-	1	-	11'
-	RW	(England)	Tony Daley	13	13	8	5	-	2	-	-	-	-	-	-	5	2	783'
-	LW	(England)	Steve Froggatt	21	21	19	2	-	1	5	-	-	1	-	-	2	8	1590'
-	CF	(Scotland)	Frank McAvennie	4	3	-	3	1	-	1	-	-	-	-	-	3	-	84'
-	CF	(England)	Cyrille Regis	21	17	8	9	4	1	3	-	-	-	-	-	9	4	734'
-	CF	(Wales)	Dean Saunders	44	44	44	-	-	16	3	-	-	2	-	-	-	-	3990'
-	CF	(Trinidad and Tobago)	Dwight Yorke	42	35	28	7	7	7	5	-	-	-	-	-	7	10	2556'

Premier League

#	Pos	Nat	Player	Sqd	App	FXI	Sub	Unu	Gls	Ast	O.G.	C.S.	Yellow card	(yellow card) (yellow-red card)	Red card	Substituted on	Substituted off	
-	GK	(Australia)	Mark Bosnich	29	17	17	-	12	-	-	-	8	-	-	-	-	-	1530'
-	GK	(England)	Michael Oakes	5	-	-	-	5	-	-	-	-	-	-	-	-	-	-
-	GK	(England)	Les Sealey	10	-	-	-	10	-	-	-	-	-	-	-	-	-	-
-	GK	(England)	Nigel Spink	40	25	25	-	15	-	1	-	7	-	-	-	-	-	2250'
-	RB	(England)	Earl Barrett	42	42	42	-	-	1	2	-	-	3	-	-	-	-	3780'
-	CB	(England)	Neil Cox	23	15	6	9	8	1	1	-	-	1	-	-	9	-	633'
-	CB	(England)	Ugo Ehiogu	10	4	1	3	6	-	1	-	-	-	-	-	3	1	130'
-	RB	(Poland)	Dariusz Kubicki	2	-	-	-	2	-	-	-	-	-	-	-	-	-	-
-	CB	(Republic of Ireland)	Paul McGrath	42	42	42	-	-	4	2	1	-	1	-	-	-	1	3772'
-	LB	(England)	Bryan Small	20	14	10	4	6	-	1	-	-	-	-	-	4	2	953'
-	LB	(Republic of Ireland)	Steve Staunton	42	42	42	-	-	2	8	-	-	2	-	-	-	1	3769'
-	CB	(England)	Shaun Teale	39	39	39	-	-	1	-	-	-	7	-	-	-	1	3491'
-	AM	(Germany)	Stefan Beinlich	9	7	1	6	2	-	-	-	-	-	-	-	6	-	178'
-	CM	(England)	Mark Blake	1	1	-	1	-	-	-	-	-	-	-	-	1	-	2'
-	AM	(Germany)	Matthias Breitkreutz	5	3	2	1	2	-	-	-	-	-	-	-	1	2	177'
-	CM	(England)	David Farrell	2	2	1	1	-	-	-	-	-	-	-	-	1	1	74'
-	CM	(Republic of Ireland)	Ray Houghton	39	39	39	-	-	3	7	-	-	1	-	-	-	1	3500'
-	AM	(Denmark)	Henrik Larsen	-	-	-	-	-	-	-	-	-	-	-	-	-	-	-
-	CM	(England)	Garry Parker	37	37	37	-	-	9	1	-	-	-	-	-	-	10	3221'
-	CM	(England)	Kevin Richardson	42	42	42	-	-	2	1	-	-	4	-	-	-	1	3744'
-	CF	(England)	Dalian Atkinson	28	28	28	-	-	11	4	-	-	1	-	-	-	4	2417'
-	CF	(England)	Martin Carruthers	1	1	-	1	-	-	-	-	-	-	-	-	1	-	11'
-	RW	(England)	Tony Daley	13	13	8	5	-	2	-	-	-	-	-	-	5	2	783'
-	LW	(England)	Steve Froggatt	17	17	16	1	-	1	5	-	-	1	-	-	1	8	1314'
-	CF	(Scotland)	Frank McAvennie	4	3	-	3	1	-	1	-	-	-	-	-	3	-	84'
-	CF	(England)	Cyrille Regis	16	13	7	6	3	1	3	-	-	-	-	-	6	3	696'
-	CF	(Wales)	Dean Saunders	35	35	35	-	-	13	2	-	-	2	-	-	-	-	3150'
-	CF	(Trinidad and Tobago)	Dwight Yorke	34	27	22	5	7	6	3	-	-	-	-	-	5	8	1921'

F.A. Cup

#	Pos	Nat	Player	Sqd	App	FXI	Sub	Unu	Gls	Ast	O.G.	C.S.	Yellow card	(yellow card) (yellow-red card)	Red card	Substituted on	Substituted off	
-	GK	(Australia)	Mark Bosnich	1	1	1	-	-	-	-	-	1	-	-	-	-	-	120'
-	GK	(England)	Michael Oakes	-	-	-	-	-	-	-	-	-	-	-	-	-	-	-
-	GK	(England)	Les Sealey	-	-	-	-	-	-	-	-	-	-	-	-	-	-	-
-	GK	(England)	Nigel Spink	3	3	3	-	-	-	-	-	1	-	-	-	-	-	270'
-	RB	(England)	Earl Barrett	4	4	4	-	-	-	-	-	-	-	-	-	-	-	390'
-	CB	(England)	Neil Cox	4	3	2	1	1	1	1	-	-	-	-	-	1	-	283'
-	CB	(England)	Ugo Ehiogu	-	-	-	-	-	-	-	-	-	-	-	-	-	-	-
-	RB	(Poland)	Dariusz Kubicki	-	-	-	-	-	-	-	-	-	-	-	-	-	-	-
-	CB	(Republic of Ireland)	Paul McGrath	4	4	4	-	-	-	-	-	-	-	-	-	-	-	390'
-	LB	(England)	Bryan Small	-	-	-	-	-	-	-	-	-	-	-	-	-	-	-
-	LB	(Republic of Ireland)	Steve Staunton	4	4	4	-	-	-	1	-	-	-	-	-	-	1	317'
-	CB	(England)	Shaun Teale	4	4	4	-	-	-	-	-	-	-	-	-	-	-	390'
-	AM	(Germany)	Stefan Beinlich	2	-	-	-	2	-	-	-	-	-	-	-	-	-	-
-	CM	(England)	Mark Blake	-	-	-	-	-	-	-	-	-	-	-	-	-	-	-
-	AM	(Germany)	Matthias Breitkreutz	-	-	-	-	-	-	-	-	-	-	-	-	-	-	-
-	CM	(England)	David Farrell	-	-	-	-	-	-	-	-	-	-	-	-	-	-	-
-	CM	(Republic of Ireland)	Ray Houghton	4	4	4	-	-	1	1	-	-	-	-	-	-	-	390'
-	AM	(Denmark)	Henrik Larsen	-	-	-	-	-	-	-	-	-	-	-	-	-	-	-
-	CM	(England)	Garry Parker	4	4	4	-	-	-	-	-	-	-	-	-	-	1	384'
-	CM	(England)	Kevin Richardson	4	4	4	-	-	-	-	-	-	-	-	-	-	-	390'
-	CF	(England)	Dalian Atkinson	-	-	-	-	-	-	-	-	-	-	-	-	-	-	-
-	CF	(England)	Martin Carruthers	-	-	-	-	-	-	-	-	-	-	-	-	-	-	-
-	RW	(England)	Tony Daley	-	-	-	-	-	-	-	-	-	-	-	-	-	-	-
-	LW	(England)	Steve Froggatt	3	3	2	1	-	-	-	-	-	-	-	-	1	-	186'
-	CF	(Scotland)	Frank McAvennie	-	-	-	-	-	-	-	-	-	-	-	-	-	-	-
-	CF	(England)	Cyrille Regis	3	2	-	2	1	-	-	-	-	-	-	-	2	-	17'
-	CF	(Wales)	Dean Saunders	4	4	4	-	-	2	-	-	-	-	-	-	-	-	390'
-	CF	(Trinidad and Tobago)	Dwight Yorke	4	4	4	-	-	1	2	-	-	-	-	-	-	2	373'

League Cup

#	Pos	Nat	Player	Sqd	App	FXI	Sub	Unu	Gls	Ast	O.G.	C.S.	Yellow card	(yellow card) (yellow-red card)	Red card	Substituted on	Substituted off	
-	GK	(Australia)	Mark Bosnich	1	-	-	-	1	-	-	-	-	-	-	-	-	-	-
-	GK	(England)	Michael Oakes	-	-	-	-	-	-	-	-	-	-	-	-	-	-	-
-	GK	(England)	Les Sealey	1	-	-	-	1	-	-	-	-	-	-	-	-	-	-
-	GK	(England)	Nigel Spink	5	5	5	-	-	-	-	-	1	-	-	-	-	-	450'
-	RB	(England)	Earl Barrett	5	5	5	-	-	-	-	-	-	-	-	-	-	-	450'
-	CB	(England)	Neil Cox	2	2	1	1	-	-	-	-	-	-	-	-	1	-	103'
-	CB	(England)	Ugo Ehiogu	1	1	1	-	-	-	-	-	-	-	-	-	-	-	90'
-	RB	(Poland)	Dariusz Kubicki	1	1	1	-	-	-	-	-	-	-	-	-	-	-	90'
-	CB	(Republic of Ireland)	Paul McGrath	4	4	4	-	-	1	-	-	-	1	-	-	-	-	360'
-	LB	(England)	Bryan Small	2	1	1	-	1	-	-	-	-	-	-	-	-	-	90'
-	LB	(Republic of Ireland)	Steve Staunton	5	5	5	-	-	-	-	-	-	-	-	-	-	-	450'
-	CB	(England)	Shaun Teale	4	4	4	-	-	1	-	-	-	-	-	-	-	-	360'
-	AM	(Germany)	Stefan Beinlich	-	-	-	-	-	-	-	-	-	-	-	-	-	-	-
-	CM	(England)	Mark Blake	1	-	-	-	1	-	-	-	-	-	-	-	-	-	-
-	AM	(Germany)	Matthias Breitkreutz	1	1	-	1	-	-	-	-	-	-	-	-	1	-	19'
-	CM	(England)	David Farrell	1	-	-	-	1	-	-	-	-	-	-	-	-	-	-
-	CM	(Republic of Ireland)	Ray Houghton	5	5	5	-	-	-	-	-	-	-	-	-	-	1	444'
-	AM	(Denmark)	Henrik Larsen	-	-	-	-	-	-	-	-	-	-	-	-	-	-	-
-	CM	(England)	Garry Parker	5	5	5	-	-	-	-	-	-	-	-	-	-	2	418'
-	CM	(England)	Kevin Richardson	5	5	5	-	-	1	2	-	-	-	-	-	-	-	450'
-	CF	(England)	Dalian Atkinson	4	4	4	-	-	2	1	-	-	-	-	-	-	1	353'
-	CF	(England)	Martin Carruthers	-	-	-	-	-	-	-	-	-	-	-	-	-	-	-
-	RW	(England)	Tony Daley	-	-	-	-	-	-	-	-	-	-	-	-	-	-	-
-	LW	(England)	Steve Froggatt	1	1	1	-	-	-	-	-	-	-	-	-	-	-	90'
-	CF	(Scotland)	Frank McAvennie	-	-	-	-	-	-	-	-	-	-	-	-	-	-	-
-	CF	(England)	Cyrille Regis	2	2	1	1	-	-	-	-	-	-	-	-	1	1	21'
-	CF	(Wales)	Dean Saunders	5	5	5	-	-	1	1	-	-	-	-	-	-	-	450'
-	CF	(Trinidad and Tobago)	Dwight Yorke	4	4	2	2	-	-	-	-	-	-	-	-	2	-	262'

Goals Involvements

Rank	#	Nat	Player	Pos	Apps	Goal Inv.	Premier League		FA Cup		League Cup		Total	
Rank	#	Nat	Player	Pos	Apps	Goal Inv.	Goals	Assists	Goals	Assists	Goals	Assists	Goals	Assists
1	-	(Wales)	Dean Saunders	CF	44	18	13	0	2	0	2	1	17	1
2	-	(England)	Dalian Atkinson	CF	32	15	11	1	0	0	2	1	13	2
3	-	(England)	Garry Parker	CM	46	10	9	1	0	0	0	0	9	1
4	-	(Trinidad and Tobago)	Dwight Yorke	CF	35	9	6	0	1	2	0	0	7	2
5	-	(Republic of Ireland)	Ray Houghton	CM	48	7	3	2	1	1	0	0	4	3
6	-	(Republic of Ireland)	Paul McGrath	CB	50	5	4	0	0	0	1	0	5	0
7	-	(England)	Kevin Richardson	CM	51	5	2	0	0	0	1	2	3	2
8	-	(England)	Cyrille Regis	CF	17	4	1	3	0	0	0	0	1	3
9	-	(Republic of Ireland)	Steve Staunton	LB	51	3	2	0	0	1	0	0	2	1
10	-	(England)	Neil Cox	RB	20	3	1	0	1	1	0	0	2	1
11	-	(England)	Tony Daley	RW	13	2	2	0	0	0	0	0	2	0
12	-	(England)	Shaun Teale	CB	47	2	1	0	0	0	1	0	2	0
13	-	(England)	Steve Froggatt	LW	21	2	1	1	0	0	0	0	1	1
14	-	(England)	Earl Barrett	RB	51	1	1	0	0	0	0	0	1	0
15	-	(England)	Bryan Small	LB	15	1	0	1	0	0	0	0	0	1
16	-	(Scotland)	Frank McAvennie	CF	3	1	0	1	0	0	0	0	0	1

Clean Sheets

Rank	#	Nat	Player	Apps	Conceded	Clean Sheets	Premier League		FA Cup		League Cup	
Rank	#	Nat	Player	Apps	Conceded	Clean Sheets	Con	CS	Con	CS	Con	CS
1	-	(Australia)	Mark Bosnich	18	10	10	10	10	0	1	0	0
2	-	(England)	Nigel Spink	33	34	9	27	8	2	1	5	1
