= Mark Camm =

English footballer (born 1980)

Personal information
- Full name: Mark Liam Camm
- Date of birth: 1 October 1980 (age 46)
- Place of birth: Mansfield, England
- Height: 5 ft 8 in (1.73 m)
- Position: Midfielder

Youth career
- ?–1999: Sheffield United

Senior career*
Years	Team	Apps	(Gls)
1999–2000	Sheffield United	0	(0)
2000–2004	Lincoln City	32	(0)
2002–2003	→ Gainsborough Trinity (loan)	10	(1)
2003	→ King's Lynn (loan)	14	(2)
2004–2009	King's Lynn	209	(4)
2009–2010	Boston United	19	(1)
2010	Worksop Town		
2010–2011	Frickley Athletic		
2010	→ Rainworth Miners Welfare (loan)		
2011	Belper Town	0	(0)
2011–2013	Rainworth Miners Welfare		

Managerial career
- 2014: Shirebrook Town
- * Club domestic league appearances and goals

Mark Liam Camm (born 1 October 1980) is an English football manager and former player. Camm featured as a professional in the Football League for Lincoln City, having also been contracted to Sheffield United without featuring. He has since forged a career in non-league football by turning out for Gainsborough Trinity, King's Lynn, Boston United, Worksop Town, Frickley Athletic, Belper Town and Rainworth Miners Welfare. He later had a spell as manager of Shirebrook Town.

== Playing career ==
Camm began his career with Sheffield United after being promoted to the club's first team squad for the start of the 1997-1998 campaign.

On 4 August 2000, he signed for Lincoln City agreeing a three-month deal with the club. On 15 January 2001, he agreed to a deal to remain with them until the end of season.

While at Sincil Bank he was mainly used as a covering midfielder, and played just under 40 times for the club in four seasons. On 7 February 2003, he joined Gainsborough Trinity on loan debuting in the following days' 1–0 home defeat to Gateshead. He remained on loan with the club until April, making ten Northern Premier League appearances and scoring one goal, his final appearance being the 1–0 victory at Worksop Town on 21 April 2003.

Camm joined Southern League side King's Lynn on a three-month loan in October 2003, making his debut against Ashford Town. On 12 January 2004, he agreed a deal to cancel his contract with Lincoln City by mutual consent enabling him to join King's Lynn on a permanent basis, agreeing an 18-month contract with the club.

Camm remained with the club until the end of the 2008–09 season. During his time at King's Lynn he was an integral part of the side which won the Southern League Eastern Division title in 2004, the Southern League Cup in 2005 and the Southern Premier League title in 2008. Whilst he was mainly utilised as a holding midfielder, he also played at full back and centre back when the need arose.

On 2 January 2006, in a league match at Banbury United; Camm played in goal for almost 80 minutes. King's Lynn were already trailing 2-0 when goalkeeper John Higgs dislocated his shoulder. With no substitute keeper on the bench Camm volunteered to don the gloves and put in an inspired performance despite the Linnets eventually losing the game 4–2.

A change in management at King's Lynn following their demotion from Conference North for ground grading issues at the end of the 2008–09 season saw Camm released from the club he had served for over five years. He made a total of 269 appearances for the West Norfolk club and scored six goals. He is still held in high regard by many King's Lynn supporters and in April 2016 he was named 47th in the club's "50 players from the past".

Finding himself without a club, Camm became the first new signing for Boston United for the 2009–10 season. He was released in May 2010.

He signed for Worksop Town in May 2010. He joined Frickley Athletic, debuting in the 3–0 defeat Northern Premier League Premier Division at Burscough on 20 November 2010. In a bid to try to obtain regular football to improve his fitness on 13 December 2010 he joined Rainworth Miners Welfare on loan. In July 2011 he signed for Belper Town. debuting in the Northern Premier League First Division South 2–1 home defeat to Grantham Town on 14 December 2010. He left the club in May 2013.

== Coaching career ==
Following his departure at Rainworth he subsequently joined Shirebrook Town's coaching staff, before being appointed joint manager alongside Danny Bacon in February 2014. However, he resigned in August 2014.
