= Craig Disley =

English association football player

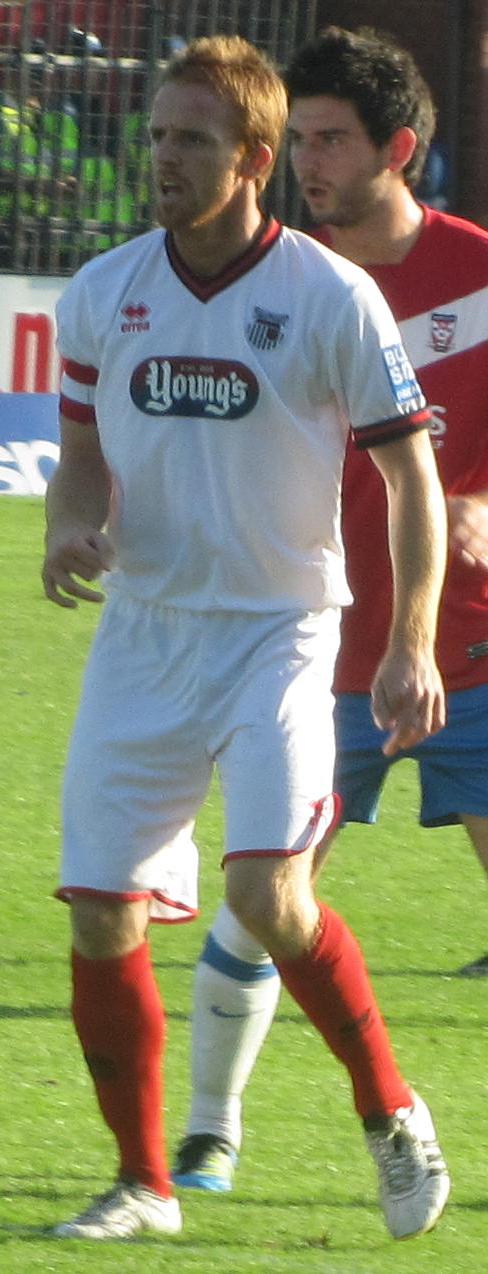
- Disley playing for Grimsby Town in 2011

Personal information
- Full name: Craig Edward Disley
- Date of birth: 24 August 1981 (age 45)
- Place of birth: Worksop, England
- Height: 5 ft 10 in (1.78 m)
- Position: Midfielder

Youth career
- –1999: Mansfield Town

Senior career*
Years	Team	Apps	(Gls)
1999–2004	Mansfield Town	141	(16)
2004–2009	Bristol Rovers	203	(25)
2009–2011	Shrewsbury Town	42	(3)
2011–2017	Grimsby Town	234	(34)
2017–2019	Alfreton Town	34	(0)
2018–2019	→ Cleethorpes Town (loan)	36	(1)
2019–2021	Barton Town	27	(0)
2022	Cleethorpes Town	0	(0)
Total		717	(79)
- * Club domestic league appearances and goals as of 13:10, 3 August 2018 (UTC)

Craig Edward Disley (born 24 August 1981) is an English football coach and former professional footballer.

Primarily a box-to-box central midfielder, he began his professional career at Mansfield Town in 1999 where he started as a youngster, and established himself in the "Stags" first team in the 2001–02 season, helping them gain promotion into the Second Division. He then decided to join Bristol Rovers in July 2004, and helped the "Gas" to win promotion out of League Two in the 2007 Football League Two play-off final. Deemed surplus to requirements, he joined Shrewsbury Town in May 2009, but injury problems meant he didn't hold a regular place in the team. He joined Grimsby Town in June 2011, and became a linchpin in their midfield over the next 5 years, helping Grimsby to win promotion out of the National League in the 2016 National League play-off final at Wembley Stadium. Having been released by Grimsby after a successful 6 years with the club, he joined Alfreton Town in the National League North for the next two years.

== Playing career ==
=== Mansfield Town ===
Born in Worksop, Nottinghamshire, Disley came through the youth ranks at Mansfield Town, and was promoted to the club's first team in the summer of 1999 under the management of Bill Dearden. He made his debut on 23 September, 1999, in a 4–0 victory over Shrewsbury Town, coming on as a 67th-minute substitute for Michael Sissons, also picking up his 1st yellow card within 3 minutes. He went on to make a further five appearances in his first season at Field Mill.

During the 2001–02 season Disley scored his first and second career goals in a 2–3 away win over Cheltenham Town on 25 August, 2001, Liam Lawrence providing both corners as Disley opened the scoring for the Stags in the 29th minute with a header, before adding a second in the 47th minute with another header. Disley earned promotion into the Second Division with Mansfield in 2001–02 under the stewardship of Stuart Watkiss. By the end of the 2002–03 season Mansfield had been relegated back down to the fourth tier of English football.

=== Bristol Rovers ===
Disley signed with Bristol Rovers in July 2004, on a two-year contract. The midfielder became a major part of the promotion campaign during the 2006–07 season and his good form continued into the 2007–08 season, when he scored nine times, including last-minute winners against Oldham Athletic and at Millwall.

=== Shrewsbury Town ===
On 5 May, 2009, Disley was told that he was free to talk to other clubs as Bristol Rovers deemed him surplus to requirements. On 4 June he signed for Shrewsbury Town on a two-year contract. On 22 February, 2010, Disley broke his ankle, which ruled him out for the rest of the 2009–10 season.

He was released on 23 May, 2011, after two years with Shrewsbury.

=== Grimsby Town ===
On 23 June, 2011, Conference Premier side Grimsby Town announced they had offered Disley a contract. On 24 June, he completed move to Grimsby a two-year contract. On 15 October, 2011, Disley scored his first goal for Grimsby in the 2–1 defeat at York City, a cross from Rob Duffy for Disley to loop a firm header over keeper Michael Ingham on four minutes, he also acquired his 4th yellow card of the season after a poor challenge on Jason Walker.

On 11 August, 2012, Disley scored the opening goal of the season for Grimsby in the 1–1 draw against Southport on 74 minutes, an Aswad Thomas cross from the left by-line was parried by goalkeeper McMillan straight into the path of Disley, scoring from close range.

Disley's goal tally reached double figures in the 2013–14 season and he was Grimsby's second top scorer, with 11 league goals, and a goal in the 3–2 FA Cup defeat to Huddersfield Town. He also scored against Gateshead in both legs of the play-off semi finals, however this was not enough to prevent Gateshead progressing to the final.

He missed just two league games of the 2014–15 season and he was Grimsby's third top scorer, with nine league goals as Paul Hurst's Grimsby came third in the Conference Premier, and secured a play-off spot.

On 26 May 2015, Disley was the first player commit his future to Grimsby for the 2015–16 season, signing a new one-year deal. Disley played in Grimsby's 3–1 victory over Forest Green Rovers in the 2016 National League play-off final at Wembley Stadium, seeing Grimsby promoted into League Two after a six-year absence from the Football League.

On 27 May, 2016, Disley agreed to a new one-year contract with the newly promoted club.

After making 32 appearances and scoring three goals for Grimsby in the 2016–17 season he was released by the club on 9 May, 2017. Grimsby Town director John Fenty released a statement following Disley's release; he said: "The club will be arranging a special benefit (testimonial) game for Craig in due course, an opportunity for good many like-minded fans to have the opportunity express their respect for a true Town legend."

On 1 November, 2017, Disley and his All Star team were defeated 7–2 by the current Grimsby Town team in his testimonial game. Disley's team included former Town players such as Shaun Pearson, Lenell John-Lewis, Liam Hearn, Aristote Nsiala, Nathan Arnold, and Michael Boulding. With goals coming from Disley himself and Ross Hannah.

=== Alfreton Town ===
Disley signed for National League North side Alfreton Town on a two-year deal on 1 June 2017. Manager John McDermott said: "It was a fantastic signing for us and we fought off stiff competition from higher clubs to land his signature."

On 7 August, 2018, Disley signed for Cleethorpes Town on season-long loan.

=== Barton Town ===
Disley signed for Barton Town at the start of the 2019–20 season.

On 12 June, 2021, Disley announced his retirement from football.

== Coaching career ==
In the summer of 2018, as well as his playing duties Disley began coaching the U16 team at former club Grimsby Town.

On 19 November. 2022, Disley returned to Cleethorpes Town as assistant manager to his former Grimsby teammate Nathan Arnold. On 22 November, 2022, due to a shortage of players for a match against North Shields, Disley came out of retirement and was named as a substitute.

Arnold and Disley left the club in March 2023, via mutual consent.

== Style of play ==
A box-to-box central midfielder who can score goals and play in a wide midfield position.

== Career statistics ==
As of match played 16 December 2017

Appearances and goals by club, season and competition
Club	Season	League			FA Cup		League Cup		Other		Total	
Club	Season	Division	Apps	Goals	Apps	Goals	Apps	Goals	Apps	Goals	Apps	Goals
Mansfield Town	1999–2000	Third Division	5	0	1	0	0	0	0	0	6	0
Mansfield Town	2000–01	Third Division	24	0	1	0	0	0	1 (Note: Appearance(s) in Football League Trophy)	0	26	0
Mansfield Town	2001–02	Third Division	36	7	2	0	1	0	0	0	39	7
Mansfield Town	2002–03	Second Division	42	4	2	0	1	0	0	0	45	4
Mansfield Town	2003–04	Third Division	34	5	4	0	0	0	4 (Note: One appearance in the Football League Trophy, three in Third Division play-offs)	0	42	5
Mansfield Town	Total		141	16	10	0	2	0	5	0	158	16
Bristol Rovers	2004–05	League Two	28	4	1	0	1	0	5	1	35	5
Bristol Rovers	2005–06	League Two	42	8	3	0	1	0	1	0	47	8
Bristol Rovers	2006–07	League Two	45	4	5	1	1	0	10 (Note: Seven appearances in Football League Trophy, three appearances and one goal in League Two play-offs)	1	61	6
Bristol Rovers	2007–08	League One	44	6	6	2	2	1	0	0	52	9
Bristol Rovers	2008–09	League One	44	3	1	0	1	0	1	0	47	3
Bristol Rovers	Total		203	25	16	3	6	1	17	2	242	31
Shrewsbury Town	2009–10	League Two	18	1	0	0	1	0	0	0	19	1
Shrewsbury Town	2010–11	League Two	24	2	1	0	2	0	2	0	29	2
Shrewsbury Town	Total		42	3	1	0	3	0	2	0	48	3
Grimsby Town	2011–12	Conference Premier	44	1	5	0	—		3 (Note: Appearances in FA Trophy)	0	52	1
Grimsby Town	2012–13	Conference Premier	40	7	1	0	—		10 (Note: Eight appearances and two goals in FA Trophy, two appearances in Conference Premier play-offs)	2	51	9
Grimsby Town	2013–14	Conference Premier	39	9	5	1	—		6 (Note: Four appearances in FA Trophy, two appearances and two goals in Conference Premier play-offs)	2	50	12
Grimsby Town	2014–15	Conference Premier	40	9	2	0	—		6 (Note: Three appearances in FA Trophy, three in Conference Premier play-offs)	0	48	9
Grimsby Town	2015–16	National League	43	6	3	0	—		7 (Note: Four appearances in FA Trophy, three in National League play-offs)	0	53	6
Grimsby Town	2016–17	League Two	28	2	1	0	0	0	3	1	32	3
Grimsby Town	Total		234	34	17	1	0	0	35	5	286	40
Alfreton Town	2017–18	National League North	16	0	0	0	—		0	0	16	0
Barton Town	2019–20	NCEFL Premier	19	0	2	0	—		3 (Note: 2 appearances in FA Vase and one appearance in League Cup)	2	24	2
Barton Town	2020–21	NCEFL Premier	8	0	1	0	—		1 (Note: Appearance(s) in FA Vase)	0	10	0
Barton Town	Total		27	0	3	0	—		4	2	34	2
Career total			663	78	47	4	11	1	63	9	784	92

== Honours ==
Mansfield Town

- Football League Third Division third-place promotion: 2001–02

Bristol Rovers

- Football League Two play-offs: 2007
- Football League Trophy runner-up: 2006–07

Grimsby Town

- National League play-offs: 2016
- FA Trophy runner-up: 2015–16
- Lincolnshire Senior Cup: 2011–12, 2012–13, 2014–15

Individual

- Conference Premier Team of the Year: 2012–13, 2013–14, 2014–15
- National League Player of the Month: March 2016
