= Darryn Stamp =

English football player and coach

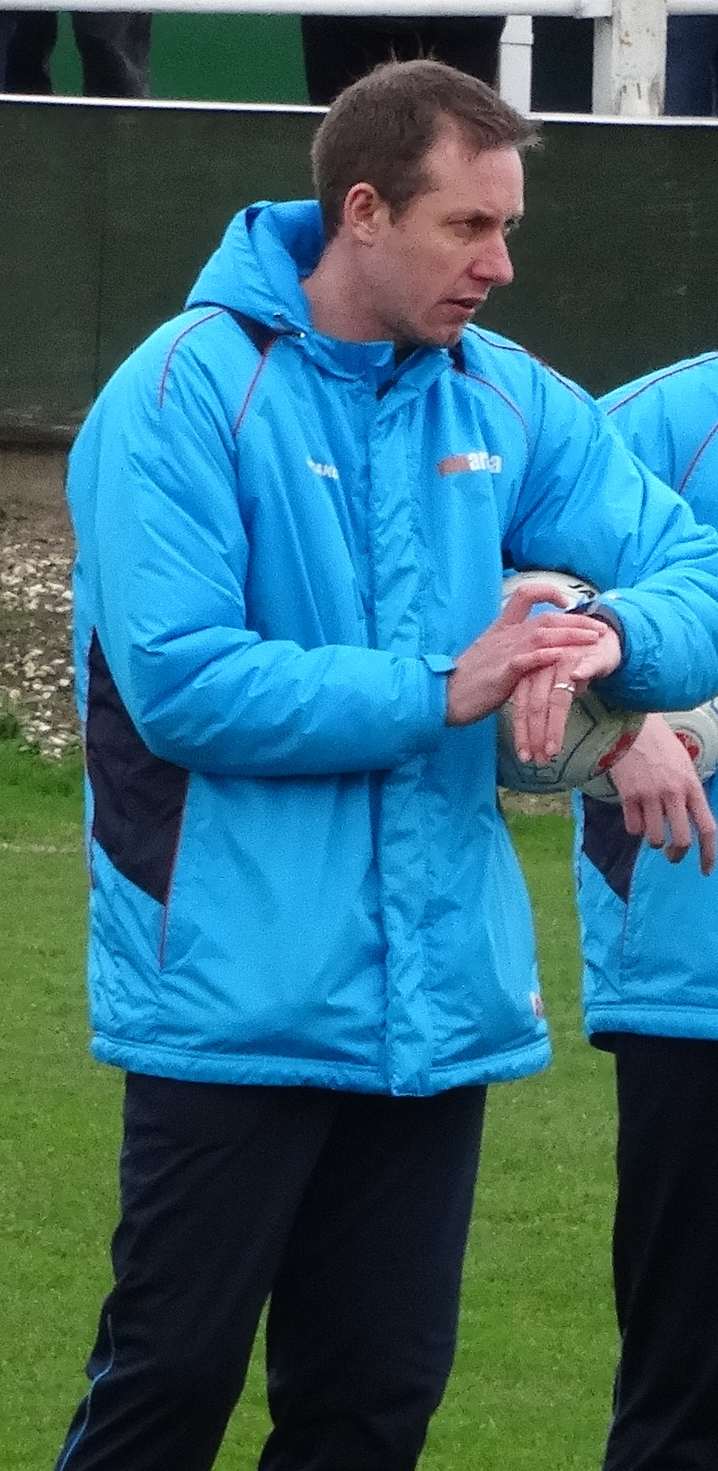
- Stamp with North Ferriby United in 2017

Personal information
- Full name: Darryn Michael Stamp
- Date of birth: 21 September 1978 (age 48)
- Place of birth: Beverley, England
- Height: 6 ft 1 in (1.85 m)
- Position: Striker

Team information
- Current team: Gainsborough Trinity (Assistant Manager)

Senior career*
Years	Team	Apps	(Gls)
1997–2001	Scunthorpe United	58	(6)
2000	→ Halifax Town (loan)	5	(0)
2001	→ Scarborough (loan)	1	(0)
2001–2002	Scarborough	31	(12)
2002–2003	Northampton Town	22	(4)
2003–2005	Chester City	40	(19)
2004	→ Kidderminster Harriers (loan)	4	(1)
2005–2007	Stevenage Borough	52	(20)
2006–2007	→ York City (loan)	9	(0)
2007–2008	Halifax Town	41	(7)
2008	→ Northwich Victoria (loan)	6	(3)
2008–2009	Northwich Victoria	26	(6)
2009	→ Gateshead (loan)	7	(2)
2009–2010	Gainsborough Trinity		
2010–2011	Guiseley	29	(7)
2011–2016	Gainsborough Trinity	127	(32)
2016–2017	North Ferriby United	4	(0)

Managerial career
- 2023: Gainsborough Trinity (interim)
- * Club domestic league appearances and goals as of 22:22, 9 February 2017 (UTC)

Darryn Michael Stamp (born 21 September 1978) is an English football coach and former professional footballer, he is the assistant manager of Gainsborough Trinity.

As a player he was a striker notably playing in the Football League for Scunthorpe United, Halifax Town, Scarborough, Northampton Town, Chester City and Kidderminster Harriers. He has also played in the Non-League game for Stevenage Borough, York City, Northwich Victoria, Gateshead, Gainsborough Trinity, Guiseley. North Ferriby United

== Playing career ==
=== Early career ===
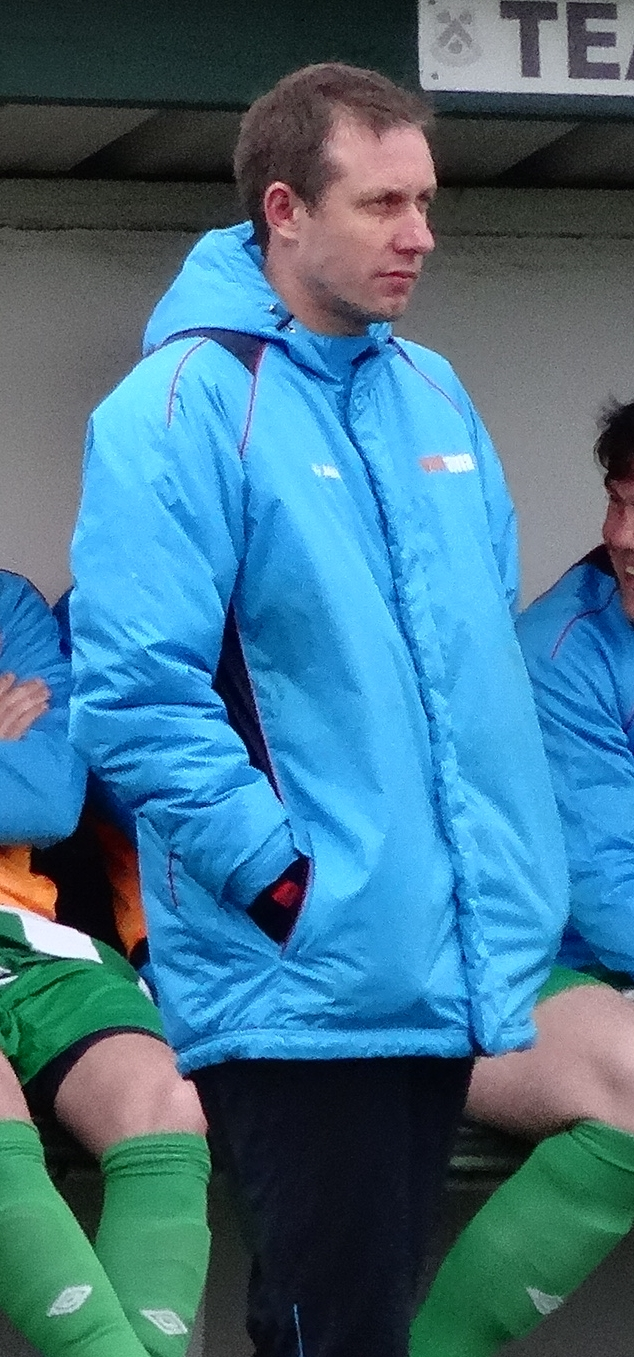
Stamp with North Ferriby United in 2017

Born in Beverley, Humberside, Stamp grew up in Hessle, playing football from an early age for his local side Hessle Rangers. It was while playing for this club that Stamp was spotted by the manager of Pontefract Collieries. He signed for the West Yorkshire side and played only a handful of games before departing to play as a professional.

=== Scunthorpe United ===
Stamp joined Scunthorpe United. Stamp signed a professional contract with the club at 17 years of age. Although he was keen to pursue his dream to be a professional footballer, he also continued his studies and stayed on at Hessle College to do A Levels in English Literature, Geography and P.E. He took part in the 1999 play-off final, when Scunthorpe United beat Leyton Orient 1–0. After four seasons at Scunthorpe, playing regularly in the reserve team and also making thirty starts for the first team, Stamp was transferred to Scarborough. Scarborough reported Northampton Town to the Football Association, after they made an alleged illegal approach for Stamp. Towards the end of his time with Scunthorpe United, Stamp had a short trail at Carlisle United, scoring in a mid-season friendly away to Workington which finished 2:2.

=== Northampton Town ===
He spent a year at the club and scored 14 goals before joining Northampton Town for £50,000. During his time at Northampton there was a lot of upheaval at the club. In the space of just over a season there were three different managers and three different chairmen, with players being transferred at an alarming rate.

=== Chester City ===
Stamp too was soon on the transfer list and was sold to Chester City for £15,000 in August 2003. He scored 20 goals during the 2003–04 season and helping to secure promotion for the club back into the Football League. He struck up a prolific partnership with Daryl Clare, with the pair scoring nearly 50 goals between them during that season. Chester sealed their promotion during the last home game of the season when they were playing Scarborough. Stamp scored the winner against his former club, securing Chester's status as Football Conference champions.

He rejected a loan move to Forest Green Rovers in October 2004. After struggling to regain his place in the Chester side following the arrival of new manager Ian Rush, playing just five games under him and failing to score.

=== Stevenage Borough ===
Stamp was transferred to Stevenage Borough during the 2004–05 season. He played in the 2005 Conference National play-off final where Stevenage missed out on promotion to Carlisle United.

Despite scoring 14 goals in the 2005–06 season, Stamp felt he had fallen out of favour at the club due to the appointment of new manager, Mark Stimson. He signed a new contract with Stevenage in May 2006.

=== York City and Halifax Town ===
He joined York City on a three-month loan deal in the 2006–07 season.

He joined Halifax Town in January 2007, in a deal which runs until June 2008. He joined Northwich Victoria on loan until the end of the 2007–08 season in March 2008. He made his debut in a 3–1 victory against Droylsden. He was recalled back to Halifax in April to help the club's battle with relegation. His return had an immediate effect after scoring after coming on as a substitute in the game against Forest Green on 5 April 2008. He was transfer-listed by the club after their demotion from the Conference Premier.

=== Later career ===
Stamp re-signed for Victoria on a permanent deal, but would depart the club after playing 26 games, scoring 6 goals. On 26 March 2009, Stamp joined Conference North side Gateshead on loan until the end of the season. He made his debut two days later against Hinckley United, scoring the fourth goal in a 5–0 victory.

Stamp signed for Gainsborough Trinity on 9 June 2009. After one season with Trinity he was released.

Stamp joined Guiseley in July 2010, and went on to be a part of the side that eventually lost in the Conference North play-offs.

Stamp re-joined Trinity in June 2011. He notably scored the equaliser in Trinity's televised 3–1 FA Trophy semi-final first leg defeat away against Wrexham.

He was released at the end of the 2015–16 season.

== Coaching career ==
Stamp was appointed Steve Housham's assistant at Gainsborough, a role he later took to North Ferriby United before leaving in 2017.

Stamp returned to Gainsborough Trinity for a third time on 7 October 2022, as a short term temporary assistant to manager Neal Bishop in the absence of Damon Parkinson. Stamp took over in the interim following the resignation of Bishop in September 2023.

== Personal life ==
Stamp is a programme leader in sport, exercise and coaching science at the University Campus North Lincolnshire, in Scunthorpe, and has completed a PhD.

== Honours ==
Scunthorpe United

- Football League Third Division play-offs: 1999

Chester City

- Football Conference: 2003–04

Gateshead

- Conference North play-offs: 2009
