= Gavin Bassinder =

English footballer

Personal information
- Full name: Gavin David Bassinder
- Date of birth: 24 November 1979 (age 46)
- Place of birth: Mexborough, England
- Position: Defender

Senior career*
| Years | Team | Apps | (Gls) |
| 1998–1999 | Barnsley | 0 | (0) |
| 1999–2000 | Mansfield Town | 4 | (0) |
| 2000 | Gainsborough Trinity | | |
| 2001 | Farsley Celtic | | |
| 2002 | Parkgate | | |
| 2003 | AFC Barnsley | | |
| 2004 | Brigg Town | | |
| Total | | 4 | (0) |
- * Club domestic league appearances and goals

Gavin David Bassinder (born 24 September 1979) is an English former professional footballer who played in the Football League for Mansfield Town.
