= Alex Hay (footballer) =

English footballer

Personal information
- Full name: Alexander Neil Hay
- Date of birth: 14 October 1981 (age 45)
- Place of birth: Birkenhead, England
- Position: Forward

Senior career*
Years	Team	Apps	(Gls)
2001–2004	Tranmere Rovers	54	(3)
2002	→ Morecambe (loan)	5	(4)
2004–2005	Rushden & Diamonds	48	(4)
2005–2006	Bangor City	18	(9)
2006–2007	Rhyl	31	(12)
2007–2009	Cammell Laird	68	(48)

Managerial career
- 2009–2010: Cammell Laird
- * Club domestic league appearances and goals

Alex Hay is an ex-footballer who played as a forward in the Football League for Tranmere Rovers, Rushden & Diamond and Morecambe. After leaving Rushden in 2005 he moved to play non-league football for Bangor City, Rhyl and Cammell Laird. Hay was a childhood Tranmere Rovers fan and grew up locally in Rock Ferry, realising his childhood dream when scoring in front of the Kop at Prenton Park v Northampton Town In 2003.

After his playing career Hay went on to be player-manager of Cammell Laird; he remained at the club for a year after resigning in November 2010. He then became chief scout for Chester before leaving in 2014 for a similar role at Tranmere Rovers. Hay joined as Head Scout but after Rob Edwards was sacked and Mickey Adams took over, Hay decided to resign after some restructuring at the club. Hay joined up with former Chester manager Neil Young at Stockport County, again being a part of the scouting team. Hay then joined up with Dave Challinor as Chief Scout at AFC Fylde where he helped guide them to the championship in the National League North and gain promotion to the National League. They got a place in the play-offs in their first season 2017/18. In 2018/19 AFC Fylde continued their good form and reached the National League Play-off Final at Wembley but lost the game 3–0 to Salford City. They returned to Wembley the following week in FA Trophy final and won the match 1–0 against Leyton Orient..
