= Carlo Camilieri-Gioia =

Belgian footballer

Personal information
- Full name: Carlo Camilieri-Gioia
- Date of birth: 14 May 1975 (age 51)
- Place of birth: Brussels, Belgium
- Position: Midfielder

Senior career*
Years	Team	Apps	(Gls)
1998–1999	Charleroi		
1999–2000	Mansfield Town	2	(0)
2000	Standard Liège		
Total		2	(0)
- * Club domestic league appearances and goals

Carlo Camilieri-Gioia (born 14 May 1975) is a Belgian former professional footballer who played in the Football League for Mansfield Town.
