= Michael Bingham (footballer) =

English footballer

Personal information
- Full name: Michael James Bingham
- Date of birth: 21 May 1981 (age 45)
- Place of birth: Leyland, England
- Position: Goalkeeper

Senior career*
Years	Team	Apps	(Gls)
1999–2001	Blackburn Rovers	0	(0)
2001–2002	Mansfield Town	2	(0)
2003	Hednesford Town		
Total		2	(0)
- * Club domestic league appearances and goals

Michael James Bingham (born 21 May 1981) is an English former professional footballer who played in the Football League for Mansfield Town.
