= David Jervis =

English footballer

Personal information
- Full name: David John Jervis
- Date of birth: 18 January 1982 (age 44)
- Place of birth: Retford, England
- Position: Defender

Senior career*
Years	Team	Apps	(Gls)
2000–2003	Mansfield Town	30	(0)
2003	Gainsborough Trinity		
2003	Kettering Town		
Total		30	(0)
- * Club domestic league appearances and goals

David John Jervis (born 18 January 1982) is an English former professional footballer who played in the Football League for Mansfield Town.
