= Martin Pemberton =

English footballer

Personal information
- Date of birth: 1 February 1976 (age 50)
- Place of birth: Bradford, England
- Position: Defender

Senior career*
Years	Team	Apps	(Gls)
1994–1997	Oldham Athletic	5	(0)
1997–1998	Doncaster Rovers	36	(2)
1998	Scunthorpe United	7	(0)
1998	Hartlepool United	4	(0)
1999–2000	Bradford Park Avenue		
2000–2002	Mansfield Town	56	(5)
2002–2005	Stockport County	26	(0)
2004	Rochdale	1	(0)
2005–2007	Farsley Celtic		
- * Club domestic league appearances and goals

Martin Pemberton (born 1 February 1976) is an English football central defender who has played for many different professional clubs before moving to non-league side Farsley Celtic in spring 2005.
