= Lee Williams (footballer, born 1973) =

English footballer

Personal information
- Date of birth: 3 February 1973 (age 53)
- Place of birth: Birmingham, England
- Position: Midfielder

Senior career*
Years	Team	Apps	(Gls)
1991–1994	Aston Villa	0	(0)
1992–1993	→ Shrewsbury Town (loan)	3	(0)
1993–1996	Peterborough United	91	(1)
1996–1997	Shamrock Rovers	14	(0)
1997–2002	Mansfield Town	177	(9)
2002–2003	Cheltenham Town	51	(3)
- Telford United
Total		336	(13)
- * Club domestic league appearances and goals

Lee Williams (born 3 February 1973) is an English former footballer who played in the Football League for Aston Villa, Shrewsbury Town, Peterborough United, Mansfield Town and Cheltenham Town.

== Honours ==
Cheltenham Town

- Football League Third Division play-offs: 2002
