= Mark Blake (footballer, born 1970) =

English footballer

Personal information
- Full name: Mark Anthony Blake
- Date of birth: 16 December 1970 (age 55)
- Place of birth: Nottingham, England
- Height: 5 ft 11 in (1.80 m)
- Position: Midfielder

Youth career
- Aston Villa

Senior career*
Years	Team	Apps	(Gls)
1989–1993	Aston Villa	31	(2)
1991	→ Wolverhampton Wanderers (loan)	2	(0)
1993–1994	Portsmouth	15	(0)
1994–1996	Leicester City	47	(4)
1996–1998	Walsall	61	(5)
1999–2001	Mansfield Town	83	(9)
2001–2002	Kidderminster Harriers	24	(4)
Total		263	(24)

International career
1990–1991	England U21	9	(1)
- * Club domestic league appearances and goals

Mark Anthony Blake (born 16 December 1970) is an English former professional footballer who played as a midfielder.

He notably played in the Premier League for both Aston Villa and Leicester City, as well as in the Football League for Wolverhampton Wanderers, Portsmouth, Walsall, Mansfield Town and Kidderminster Harriers.

== Career ==
Blake started out as a trainee at Aston Villa, where he played a total of 31 games, scoring two goals. He had a brief loan spell at Wolverhampton Wanderers during early 1991, before leaving Villa for Portsmouth in August 1993 for £400,000.

He played just 15 games for Portsmouth before he returned to the Midlands less than eight months later when Leicester City paid £360,000 for him in March 1994 on transfer deadline day, two months before they won promotion to the Premier League.

He made 47 appearances for Leicester in two years before he dropped through the leagues to join Walsall. He spent two seasons at Walsall before his contract expired and he signed for Mansfield Town in August 1999. After two seasons and 83 league games he made his final move to Kidderminster Harriers.

== Honours ==
Leicester City

- Football League First Division play-offs: 1994
