= Shayne Bradley =

English footballer (born 1979)

Personal information
- Date of birth: 8 December 1979 (age 46)
- Place of birth: Gloucester, England
- Height: 6 ft 0 in (1.83 m)
- Position: Striker

Youth career
- Robinswood Youth

Senior career*
Years	Team	Apps	(Gls)
1998–2000	Southampton	4	(0)
1999	→ Swindon Town (loan)	7	(0)
1999	→ Exeter City (loan)	8	(1)
2000–2002	Mansfield Town	47	(11)
2002–2003	Eastwood Town		
2002–2003	→ Chesterfield (loan)	9	(2)
2003	→ Lincoln City (loan)	3	(1)

International career
- England schoolboys

Managerial career
- 2008–2011: Tuffley Rovers (player-manager)
- * Club domestic league appearances and goals

Shayne Bradley (born 8 December 1979) is an English former professional footballer; during his football career, he played as a striker.

He retired after suffering an ankle ligament injury in 2003, and in 2021 was sent to prison for two and a half years for stalking a former girlfriend.

== England schoolboys ==
During 1994 and 1995, Bradley was successful in a number of trials and was selected to play for the England schoolboys squad for the Victory Shield matches against Northern Ireland, Scotland and Wales, as well as friendlies against Brazil and Germany. Bradley was selected in the starting eleven for the first game against Wales, played at Spytty Park, Newport. He played centre-forward, partnering current Manchester United striker Michael Owen; the team was captained by United defender Wes Brown.

== Professional career ==
When he turned 16, Bradley was offered a YTS contract at Southampton and, at the expiry of this, his first professional contract. Between 1998 and 2001, Bradley was a regular scorer for the reserve team, but played only four games for the first team (all as substitute). He also played a number of first team games on loan at Exeter City and Swindon Town. After a meeting with Southampton manager Glenn Hoddle, Bradley decided to move to Mansfield Town to get more first team games. It was reported that the transfer fee of £100,000 was Mansfield's club record.

== Mansfield Town ==
Bradley started his Mansfield career well, scoring nine goals in his first half season and striking an effective partnership with Chris Greenacre. In the 2001–02 season, Mansfield manager Billy Dearden left the club and was replaced by Stuart Watkiss. At the time, Mansfield were chasing promotion from Division 3. The Stags suffered a dip in form under Watkiss, but were still able to gain promotion at the end of the season. Bradley was a regular scorer when he played, but he was beginning to have problems with a series of injuries.

Bradley began the 2002–2003 season by injuring his ankle in a pre-season friendly against Nottingham Forest on 27 July 2002 and then, in his bid to return to fitness, damaged the ligaments in his other ankle in a reserve team game against Hull City on 28 August 2002. The injury required surgery. In October Bradley's contract was paid up by the club, with manager Stuart Watkiss stating that, as the club's record signing and one of its highest earners, "this was the deal of a lifetime". To try to obtain fitness, Bradley signed for non-league side Eastwood Town.

== Chesterfield and Lincoln City ==
In December 2002, Bradley signed for Mansfield's local rivals Chesterfield, agreeing a contract until the end of the 2002–03 season. He made his Chesterfield debut in the 1–0 home defeat to Oldham Athletic on 21 December 2002 before scoring in his next two games. On 18 January 2003, Chesterfield entertained Bradley's previous club Mansfield Town, whom he had left under something of a cloud. In the build-up, he expressed the opinion that he did not think that Watkiss rated him as a player and that the club had treated him badly by playing him when he was not fully fit. The game, however, proved to be a disaster for Bradley when, just three minutes after coming on as a substitute, he was sent off for spitting at Mansfield defender Rhys Day; Bradley later sent a personal letter of apology to Day.

Following the resulting suspension, Bradley struggled to make the first-team and, in March 2003, joined Lincoln City on a month's loan, debuting in the 3–0 home victory over Hartlepool United on 4 March 2003. A calf injury saw him limp off after 35 minutes of his second game against Southend United at Roots Hall and miss the following three games before making a goalscoring return in the 1–0 home victory over Kidderminster Harriers on 25 March 2003. However, he sustained an ankle injury in the pre-match warm-up for the following game with Bristol Rovers and returned to Chesterfield, having been fit for just three of the seven games Lincoln played in the month.

== After football ==
Bradley retired at the end of the 2002–03 season after a double reconstruction of his right ankle and returned to his home town of Gloucester. After a few years away from football, he was offered a coaching role with Gloucester City's youth set-up where he is in charge of the U13s. In July 2008, he was appointed manager of Tuffley Rovers in the Gloucestershire County League, although continuing his work with Gloucester. Outside of football, Bradley resides in Abbeymead and works for E-on.

Following an appearance at Gloucester Crown Court in April 2021, he was imprisoned for two and a half years for stalking a former girlfriend. He was also sentenced to a five-year restraining order to prevent him contacting the victim.
