= Alistair Asher =

English footballer

Personal information
- Full name: Alistair Asher
- Date of birth: 14 October 1980 (age 46)
- Place of birth: Leicester, England
- Position: Defender

Senior career*
Years	Team	Apps	(Gls)
1999–2002	Mansfield Town	73	(0)
2002–2003	Halifax Town	35	(0)
- Hucknall Town
Total		108	(0)
- * Club domestic league appearances and goals

Alistair Asher (born 14 October 1980) is an English former footballer who played in the Football League for Mansfield Town.
