= Danny Bacon =

English footballer (born 1980)

Personal information
- Full name: Daniel Stephen Bacon
- Date of birth: 20 September 1980 (age 46)
- Place of birth: Mansfield, England
- Height: 5 ft 10 in (1.78 m)
- Position: Striker

Youth career
- 1998–2000: Mansfield Town

Senior career*
Years	Team	Apps	(Gls)
1998–2003	Mansfield Town	44	(4)
2003–2005	Hucknall Town	83	(30)
2005–2007	Lincoln City	2	(0)
2005–2006	→ Burton Albion (loan)	5	(0)
2006–2007	→ Worksop Town (loan)	10	(2)
2007	Hednesford Town	13	(0)
2007–2009	Hucknall Town	28	(8)
2009–2011	Worksop Town		
2011–2013	Rainworth Miners Welfare		
2013–2014	Shirebrook Town		
2016–2018	Teversal		

International career
2004	England C	1	(0)
- * Club domestic league appearances and goals as of 18:27, 29 February 2008 (UTC)

Daniel Stephen Bacon (born 20 September 1980) is an English former footballer and coach who played as a striker.

He notably played in the Football League for Mansfield Town and Lincoln City. He also played at non-league level for Hucknall Town, Burton Albion, Worksop Town, Hednesford Town, Hucknall Town, Rainworth Miners Welfare, Shirebrook Town and Teversal.

== Playing career ==
=== Early career ===
He began his career with his home town club Mansfield Town. He then had a two-year spell with nearby Hucknall Town. While at Hucknall he scored in the 2005 FA Trophy final penalty defeat against Grays Athletic.

=== Lincoln City ===
On 30 May 2005, Bacon secured a move back to the professional ranks, agreeing a one-year deal with Lincoln City. He struggled to break into the first team, making just two substitute appearances (the Football League Two defeat at Notts County on 13 August 2005 and the League Cup victory over Crewe Alexandra ten days later), and on 9 September 2005 was allowed to join Burton Albion on loan. However, injury struck in his fifth game when he fractured his fibia in a game against Aldershot; it was the second time he had broken his leg, the first being whilst playing for Mansfield Town's youth team. The injury kept him out of the squad for six months but, in light of his injury, he was given a new contract by Keith Alexander in April 2006.

Given the number 10 shirt at Sincil Bank for the 2006–07 season, he made his first start in the opening fixture at Notts County but his injury jinx hit again as he first suffered a nasty facial cut, requiring nine stitches, following a clash with Jason Lee and then injured his ankle. Upon his recovery to fitness, he found it hard to break into the Lincoln team which was riding high in the upper echelons of the league table and in September 2006 he was loaned out to Worksop Town where he spent three months. On 3 January 2007, Bacon along with Gary Birch, Luke Foster and Jamie Sherlock was told by the club that they were free to find another club and on 25 January 2007 he had his contract with the Imps cancelled by mutual consent, leaving him free to join Northern Premier League side Hednesford Town.

=== Non-League ===
In summer 2007, Andy Legg, bought him back to Hucknall Town. He was expected to leave Watnall Road in summer 2009 having turned down a move to Alfreton Town. On Tuesday 23 June, Bacon signed for Worksop Town, one of his former clubs. He made a goalscoring debut for the club, scoring the club's goal in the 4–1 Northern Premier League defeat at Kendal Town on 15 August 2009.

In May 2013, both he and Mark Camm departed Rainworth Miners Welfare to join Shirebrook Town as player/assistants to the newly appointed manager Julian Watts. Following six games without a victory, Watts was sacked in October 2013 but Bacon and Camm agreed to continue their roles under the new manager Kevin Gee. However, Gee was last just over three months into the role before being sacked with Bacon and Camm appointed joint-manager in his place on contracts lasting until the end of the 2015–16 season. However, Camm resigned from his role at the end of August 2014 and Julian Watts returned to take sole managerial charge of the club.

== Coaching career ==
In July 2016, he was appointed player-coach at Teversal.
