= Andy White (footballer, born 1981) =

English footballer

Personal information
- Date of birth: 6 November 1981 (age 44)
- Place of birth: Derby, England
- Position: Forward

Youth career
- 1999–2000: Hucknall Town

Senior career*
Years	Team	Apps	(Gls)
1997–2004	Mansfield Town	68	(7)
2002	→ Crewe Alexandra (loan)	3	(0)
2003	→ Boston United (loan)	3	(0)
2003–2004	→ Kidderminster Harriers (loan)	7	(1)
2004	→ Burton Albion (loan)	3	(1)
2004–2005	Crewe Alexandra	22	(4)
2005–2006	Notts County	26	(2)
2006–2007	Kidderminster Harriers	27	(3)
2007	→ Stafford Rangers (loan)	6	(0)
2007	Alfreton Town		
2007–2010	Worksop Town		
- * Club domestic league appearances and goals

Andy White (born 6 November 1981) is an English footballer. He is 6 foot 4 inches and weighs 14 stone.

He played his first football at Hucknall Town, before being signed by Stuart Watkiss at Mansfield Town. In July 2002, he signed a new two-year contract with Mansfield. He was loaned out to various clubs including Boston United, Crewe Alexandra, Kidderminster Harriers and Burton Albion. He was released, by the then manager, Keith Curle and then joined Championship side Crewe Alexandra. When he was released by Crewe, Gudjon Thordarson signed him for Notts County.

In June 2006 White re-joined Kidderminster Harriers on a one-year contract. In March 2007 he joined Stafford Rangers on a short-term loan deal. White was then released by Kidderminster at the end of the 2006-07 season. White joined Alfreton Town F.C. at the start of the 2007-2008 season, linking up with ex-Chesterfield and Bradford City manager Nicky Law. He soon moved on to Worksop Town. In May 2009 he signed a new contract for Worksop Town which was expected to run for two seasons, but was released in 2010

After leaving Worksop, White went onto play amateur football in the, step seven, Central Midlands Football League with Sutton Town A.F.C. and Swanwick Pentrich Road FC.
