= Michael Sisson =

English footballer

Personal information
- Full name: Michael Anthony Sisson
- Date of birth: 24 November 1978 (age 47)
- Place of birth: Mansfield, England
- Position: Midfielder

Senior career*
Years	Team	Apps	(Gls)
1997–2001	Mansfield Town	31	(2)
2001	Ilkeston Town		
Total		31	(2)
- * Club domestic league appearances and goals

Michael Anthony Sisson (born 24 November 1978) is an English former professional footballer who played in the Football League for Mansfield Town.
