= 2006–07 Mansfield Town F.C. season =

Mansfield Town
2006–07 season
- Manager: Peter Shirtliff, Paul Holland, Bill Dearden
- Stadium: Field Mill
- Football League Two: 17th
- FA Cup: Second round
- League Cup: Second round
- Football League Trophy: Second round

During the 2006–07 English football season, Mansfield Town Football Club competed in Football League Two where they finished in 17th position with 54 points.

== Final league table ==
Pos	Team	Pld	W	D	L	GF	GA	GD	Pts
15	Grimsby Town	46	17	8	21	57	73	−16	59
16	Hereford United	46	14	13	19	45	53	−8	55
17	Mansfield Town	46	14	12	20	58	63	−5	54
18	Chester City	46	13	14	19	40	48	−8	53
19	Wrexham	46	13	12	21	43	65	−22	51

Rules for classification: In the Football League goals scored (GF) takes precedence over goal difference (GD).

== Results ==
Mansfield Town's score comes first

=== Legend ===
Win	Draw	Loss

=== Football League Two ===
Match	Date	Opponent	Venue	Result	Attendance	Scorers
1	5 August 2006	Shrewsbury Town	A	2–2	5,066	Hamshaw, Brown
2	8 August 2006	Milton Keynes Dons	H	2–1	4,033	Barker, Boulding
3	12 August 2006	Stockport County	H	1–1	3,856	Hamshaw
4	18 August 2006	Grimsby Town	A	1–1	4,604	Hamshaw
5	26 August 2006	Lincoln City	H	2–4	4,596	Barker, Reet
6	1 September 2006	Wycombe Wanderers	A	0–1	4,754	
7	9 September 2006	Hereford United	H	4–1	3,242	Mkandawire (o.g.), Barker (2), Reet
8	12 September 2006	Hartlepool United	A	0–2	3,899	
9	16 September 2006	Torquay United	A	0–1	2,660	
10	23 September 2006	Accrington Stanley	H	2–2	3,088	Hamshaw, Boulding
11	26 September 2006	Darlington	H	1–0	2,794	Reet
12	30 September 2006	Walsall	A	0–4	5,420	
13	7 October 2006	Notts County	H	2–2	6,182	Reet (2)
14	14 October 2006	Boston United	A	1–1	2,314	Barker
15	21 October 2006	Wrexham	H	3–0	2,971	Barker (2), Reet
16	28 October 2006	Macclesfield Town	A	3–2	2,599	Barker (2), Coke
17	4 November 2006	Bristol Rovers	A	0–1	5,044	
18	18 November 2006	Peterborough United	H	0–2	3,550	
19	25 November 2006	Rochdale	A	0–2	2,378	
20	5 December 2006	Swindon Town	H	2–0	2,274	Barker, Brown
21	9 December 2006	Bury	H	0–2	2,197	
22	16 December 2006	Barnet	A	1–2	1,790	Barker
23	26 December 2006	Darlington	A	2–0	3,808	Barker, Arnold
24	1 January 2007	Hartlepool United	H	0–1	3,531	
25	13 January 2007	Hereford United	A	3–1	3,048	Boulding, Conlon, Gritton
26	16 January 2007	Accrington Stanley	A	2–3	1,234	Conlon, Dawson
27	20 January 2007	Walsall	H	2–1	3,737	Conlon, Gritton
28	27 January 2007	Chester City	A	1–1	2,129	Buxton
29	30 January 2007	Torquay United	H	5–0	2,573	Gritton (3), Baptiste, Boulding
30	3 February 2007	Shrewsbury Town	H	1–1	3,250	Brown
31	10 February 2007	Stockport County	A	0–1	5,656	
32	17 February 2007	Grimsby Town	H	1–2	4,033	Boulding
33	20 February 2007	Milton Keynes Dons	A	1–1	5,070	Arnold
34	24 February 2007	Wycombe Wanderers	H	3–2	2,711	Gritton, Mullins, D'Laryea
35	3 March 2007	Lincoln City	A	2–1	5,316	Arnold, Conlon
36	6 March 2007	Chester City	H	2–1	2,366	Brown, Baptiste
37	10 March 2007	Notts County	A	0–0	10,344	
38	17 March 2007	Boston United	H	1–2	2,790	Conlon
39	23 March 2007	Macclesfield Town	H	1–2	2,414	Mullins
40	31 March 2007	Wrexham	A	0–0	7,752	
41	7 April 2007	Bristol Rovers	H	0–1	2,392	
42	9 April 2007	Peterborough United	A	0–2	4,276	
43	14 April 2007	Rochdale	H	1–2	2,023	Hjelde
44	21 April 2007	Swindon Town	A	0–2	10,472	
45	28 April 2007	Barnet	H	2–1	2,446	Conlon, Brown
46	5 May 2007	Bury	A	1–1	3,532	Baptiste

=== FA Cup ===
Round	Date	Opponent	Venue	Result	Attendance	Scorers
R1	11 November 2006	Accrington Stanley	H	1–0	3,909	Barker
R2	2 December 2006	Doncaster Rovers	H	1–1	4,837	Barker
R2 Replay	12 December 2006	Doncaster Rovers	A	0–2	5,338	

=== League Cup ===
Round	Date	Opponent	Venue	Result	Attendance	Scorers
R1	22 August 2006	Huddersfield Town	A	2–0	5,111	Boulding, Barker
R2	19 September 2006	Portsmouth	H	1–2	6,646	Reet

=== Football League Trophy ===
Round	Date	Opponent	Venue	Result	Attendance	Scorers
R1	31 October 2006	Grimsby Town	H	3–0	1,761	Beardsley (2), Butler (o.g.)
R2	28 November 2006	Darlington	A	0–1	2,059	

== Squad statistics ==
No.	Pos.	Name	League		FA Cup		League Cup		League Trophy		Total	
No.	Pos.	Name	Apps	Goals	Apps	Goals	Apps	Goals	Apps	Goals	Apps	Goals
1	GK	(England) Jason White	30	0	0	0	2	0	1	0	33	0
2	DF	(England) Johnny Mullins	39(4)	2	1(1)	0	2	0	1	0	43(5)	2
3	DF	(Wales) Gareth Jelleyman	39(1)	0	3	0	2	0	0	0	44(1)	0
4	DF	(England) Jonathan D'Laryea	37	1	3	0	2	0	2	0	44	1
5	DF	(Norway) Jon Olav Hjelde	25(3)	1	3	0	0	0	1	0	29(3)	1
6	DF	(England) Alex Baptiste	46	3	3	0	2	0	2	0	53	3
7	MF	(England) Matthew Hamshaw	38(2)	4	3	0	2	0	1	0	44(2)	4
8	DF	(Republic of Ireland) Stephen Dawson	32(2)	1	0(1)	0	2	0	0	0	34(3)	1
9	FW	(Republic of Ireland) Barry Conlon	16(1)	6	0	0	0	0	0	0	16(1)	6
9	FW	(England) Richie Barker	24	12	3	2	2	1	0	0	29	15
10	FW	(England) Simon Brown	30(4)	5	2(1)	0	1	0	1(1)	0	34(6)	5
11	FW	(England) Michael Boulding	25(14)	5	2(1)	0	1(1)	1	2	0	30(16)	6
12	DF	(England) Jake Buxton	27(3)	1	2	0	2	0	2	0	33(3)	1
14	MF	(England) Jamie McGhee	0(2)	0	0	0	0	0	0	0	0(2)	0
14	MF	(England) Chris Beardsley	3(7)	0	1(1)	0	1(1)	0	2	2	7(9)	2
14	MF	(Scotland) Bryan Hodge	9	0	0	0	0	0	0	0	9	0
15	MF	(England) Giles Coke	15(6)	1	3	0	1	0	1	0	20(6)	1
16	FW	(England) Nathan Arnold	6(16)	3	1	0	0	0	1	0	8(16)	3
19	GK	(England) Carl Muggleton	16(1)	0	3	0	0	0	1	0	20(1)	0
20	FW	(Scotland) Martin Gritton	14(5)	6	0	0	0	0	0	0	14(5)	6
20	MF	(Republic of Ireland) Alan Sheehan	9(1)	0	0	0	0	0	1	0	10(1)	0
21	DF	(England) Asa Charlton	3(1)	0	0	0	0	0	1	0	4(1)	0
22	MF	(England) Callum Lloyd	6(13)	0	0	0	0(1)	0	2	0	8(14)	0
23	MF	(England) Danny Sleath	3(4)	0	0	0	0	0	0	0	3(4)	0
24	DF	(England) Chris Wood	1	0	0	0	0	0	0(2)	0	1(2)	0
25	DF	(England) Ashley Kitchen	3	0	0	0	0	0	0	0	3	0
25	FW	(England) Austin McIntosh	1	0	0	0	0	0	0	0	1	0
26	MF	(Wales) Adam Birchall	1(4)	0	0	0	0	0	0	0	1(4)	0
30	FW	(England) Rory Boulding	0(9)	0	0	0	0	0	0(2)	0	0(11)	0
31	FW	(England) Danny Reet	8(12)	6	0(2)	0	0(1)	1	0(1)	0	9(16)	7
32	MF	(England) Lewis Trimmer	0(1)	0	0	0	0	0	0	0	0(1)	0
–	–	Own goals	–	1	–	0	–	0	–	1	–	2
