= 2005–06 Mansfield Town F.C. season =

Mansfield Town
2005–06 season
- Manager: Carlton Palmer, Peter Shirtliff
- Stadium: Field Mill
- Football League Two: 16th
- FA Cup: Third round
- League Cup: Third round
- Football League Trophy: First round

During the 2005–06 English football season, Mansfield Town Football Club competed in Football League Two where they finished in 16th position with 54 points.

== Final league table ==
Pos	Team	Pld	W	D	L	GF	GA	GD	Pts
14	Rochdale	46	14	14	18	66	69	−3	56
15	Chester City	46	14	12	20	53	59	−6	54
16	Mansfield Town	46	13	15	18	59	66	−7	54
17	Macclesfield Town	46	12	18	16	60	71	−11	54
18	Barnet	46	12	18	16	44	57	−13	54

Rules for classification: In the Football League goals scored (GF) takes precedence over goal difference (GD).

== Results ==
Mansfield Town's score comes first

=== Legend ===
Win	Draw	Loss

=== Football League Two ===
Match	Date	Opponent	Venue	Result	Attendance	Scorers
1	6 August 2005	Stockport County	A	2–2	4,970	Dawson, Birchall
2	9 August 2005	Rushden & Diamonds	H	0–1	3,402	
3	13 August 2005	Torquay United	H	3–0	2,632	Rundle, Peers, Brown
4	20 August 2005	Peterborough United	A	0–2	4,056	
5	27 August 2005	Boston United	A	2–2	2,848	Barker, Brown
6	29 August 2005	Notts County	H	2–3	6,444	Barker, Jelleyman
7	2 September 2005	Chester City	A	1–3	3,079	Baptiste
8	10 September 2005	Darlington	H	2–2	2,803	Brown (2)
9	17 September 2005	Rochdale	A	0–2	2,965	
10	24 September 2005	Wycombe Wanderers	H	2–3	3,237	Brown, Barker
11	27 September 2005	Macclesfield Town	H	1–1	1,576	Birchall
12	1 October 2005	Leyton Orient	A	1–3	4,164	Coke
13	7 October 2005	Shrewsbury Town	H	4–0	3,334	Coke, Barker, Rundle, Uhlenbeek
14	15 October 2005	Carlisle United	A	0–1	5,293	
15	22 October 2005	Barnet	H	4–0	2,809	Barker (2), Brown, Rundle
16	29 October 2005	Cheltenham Town	A	2–0	3,033	Barker, Brown
17	11 November 2005	Bury	H	0–3	4,147	
18	26 November 2005	Stockport County	H	2–1	2,994	Barker, Peers
19	6 December 2005	Wrexham	A	1–4	3,421	Barker
20	10 December 2005	Rushden & Diamonds	A	2–1	2,477	Brown, Coke
21	17 December 2005	Peterborough United	H	0–0	3,891	
22	26 December 2005	Northampton Town	A	0–1	6,112	
23	28 December 2005	Bristol Rovers	H	3–3	2,357	Russell, Rundle, Arnold
24	31 December 2005	Oxford United	A	2–1	4,005	Day (2)
25	2 January 2006	Lincoln City	H	0–0	4,946	
26	14 January 2006	Grimsby Town	A	1–2	4,506	Barker
27	17 January 2006	Shrewsbury Town	A	0–0	3,747	
28	21 January 2006	Rochdale	H	1–0	3,018	Reet
29	24 January 2006	Chester City	H	1–2	3,219	Reet
30	28 January 2006	Darlington	A	0–4	4,282	
31	4 February 2006	Macclesfield Town	H	1–1	2,901	Rundle
32	11 February 2006	Wycombe Wanderers	A	2–2	5,041	Barker, Hjelde
33	14 February 2006	Grimsby Town	H	2–1	3,053	Barker, Coke
34	18 February 2006	Wrexham	H	2–2	3,129	Barker (2)
35	25 February 2006	Torquay United	A	2–0	2,494	Reet, Brown
36	4 March 2006	Notts County	A	2–2	9,779	Barker, Wilson
37	11 March 2006	Boston United	H	5–0	3,121	Barker, Brown, Uhlenbeek, Reet, Greaves (o.g.)
38	18 March 2006	Northampton Town	H	1–0	3,121	Barker
39	25 March 2006	Bristol Rovers	A	0–2	5,253	
40	1 April 2006	Oxford United	H	1–0	3,480	Reet
41	8 April 2006	Lincoln City	A	1–1	6,062	Russell
42	15 April 2006	Leyton Orient	H	0–1	4,793	
43	17 April 2006	Barnet	A	0–1	2,784	
44	22 April 2006	Carlisle United	H	1–1	4,488	Barker
45	29 April 2006	Bury	A	0–0	3,105	
46	6 May 2006	Cheltenham Town	H	0–5	3,728	

=== FA Cup ===
Round	Date	Opponent	Venue	Result	Attendance	Scorers
R1	5 November 2005	Rotherham United	A	4–3	4,089	Barker (2), Brown, Coke
R2	2 December 2005	Grays Athletic	H	3–0	2,992	Barker (2), Birchall
R3	7 January 2006	Newcastle United	A	0–1	41,459	

=== League Cup ===
Round	Date	Opponent	Venue	Result	Attendance	Scorers
R1	23 August 2005	Stoke City	H	1–1 (3–0 pens)	2,799	Jelleyman
R2	20 September 2005	Southampton	H	1–0	3,739	Coke
R3	25 October 2005	Millwall	H	2–3	4,133	Barker, Brown

=== Football League Trophy ===
Round	Date	Opponent	Venue	Result	Attendance	Scorers
R1	18 October 2005	Hereford United	H	0–1	1,393	

== Squad statistics ==
No.	Pos.	Name	League		FA Cup		League Cup		League Trophy		Total	
No.	Pos.	Name	Apps	Goals	Apps	Goals	Apps	Goals	Apps	Goals	Apps	Goals
1	GK	(England) Kevin Pressman	41	0	3	0	2	0	0	0	46	0
2	DF	(Republic of Ireland) Gavin Peers	12(1)	2	0	0	2	0	0	0	14(1)	2
3	DF	(Wales) Gareth Jelleyman	33(1)	1	2	0	3	1	0(1)	0	38(2)	2
4	DF	(England) Jonathan D'Laryea	29	0	0	0	1	0	0	0	30	0
4	DF	(England) Carlton Palmer	1	0	0	0	0	0	0	0	1	0
5	DF	(Wales) Rhys Day	21	2	1(1)	0	2	0	1	0	25(1)	2
6	DF	(England) Alex Baptiste	40(1)	1	3	0	3	0	1	0	47(1)	1
7	DF	(Republic of Ireland) Stephen Dawson	31(1)	1	3	0	1	0	1	0	36(1)	1
8	DF	(Suriname) Gus Uhlenbeek	28(12)	2	2	0	2	0	0	0	32(12)	2
9	FW	(England) Richie Barker	41(2)	18	3	4	3	1	0	0	47(2)	23
10	FW	(Wales) Matthew Tipton	4	0	0	0	0	0	0	0	4	0
11	FW	(Wales) Adam Birchall	15(16)	2	1(2)	1	1(1)	0	1	0	18(19)	3
12	DF	(England) Jake Buxton	36(3)	0	3	0	2	0	0	0	41(3)	0
13	GK	(England) Jason White	5	0	0	0	1	0	1	0	7	0
14	MF	(England) Jason Talbot	6	0	1	0	2	0	1	0	10	0
15	MF	(England) Giles Coke	33(7)	4	3	1	3	1	0(1)	0	39(8)	6
16	MF	(England) Fraser McLachlan	7(1)	0	0	0	1	0	1	0	9(1)	0
17	MF	(England) Callum Lloyd	3(9)	0	0	0	0	0	1	0	4(9)	0
18	FW	(England) Adam Rundle	27(8)	5	3	0	1	0	0	0	31(8)	5
19	MF	(England) Chris Beardsley	2(1)	0	0	0	1	0	0	0	3(1)	0
20	MF	(England) Simon Brown	15(14)	10	1	1	2(1)	1	0	0	18(15)	12
21	MF	(England) Kyle Jacobs	4(1)	0	0	0	0	0	1	0	5(1)	0
22	MF	(Norway) Jon Olav Hjelde	30(1)	1	2	0	0	0	0	0	32(1)	1
23	MF	(Scotland) Allan Russell	7(11)	2	2	0	0	0	0	0	9(11)	2
24	MF	(England) Nathan Arnold	5(3)	1	0(1)	0	0	0	1	0	6(4)	1
25	MF	(England) Adrian Littlejohn	0(7)	0	0	0	0	0	1	0	1(7)	0
27	MF	(England) Laurence Wilson	14(1)	1	0	0	0	0	0	0	14(1)	1
31	FW	(England) Danny Reet	16(2)	5	0	0	0	0	0	0	16(2)	5
48	DF	(England) R Clarke	0 (1)	0	0	0	0	0	0	0	0	0
