= Chris Beardsley =

English association football player (born 1984)

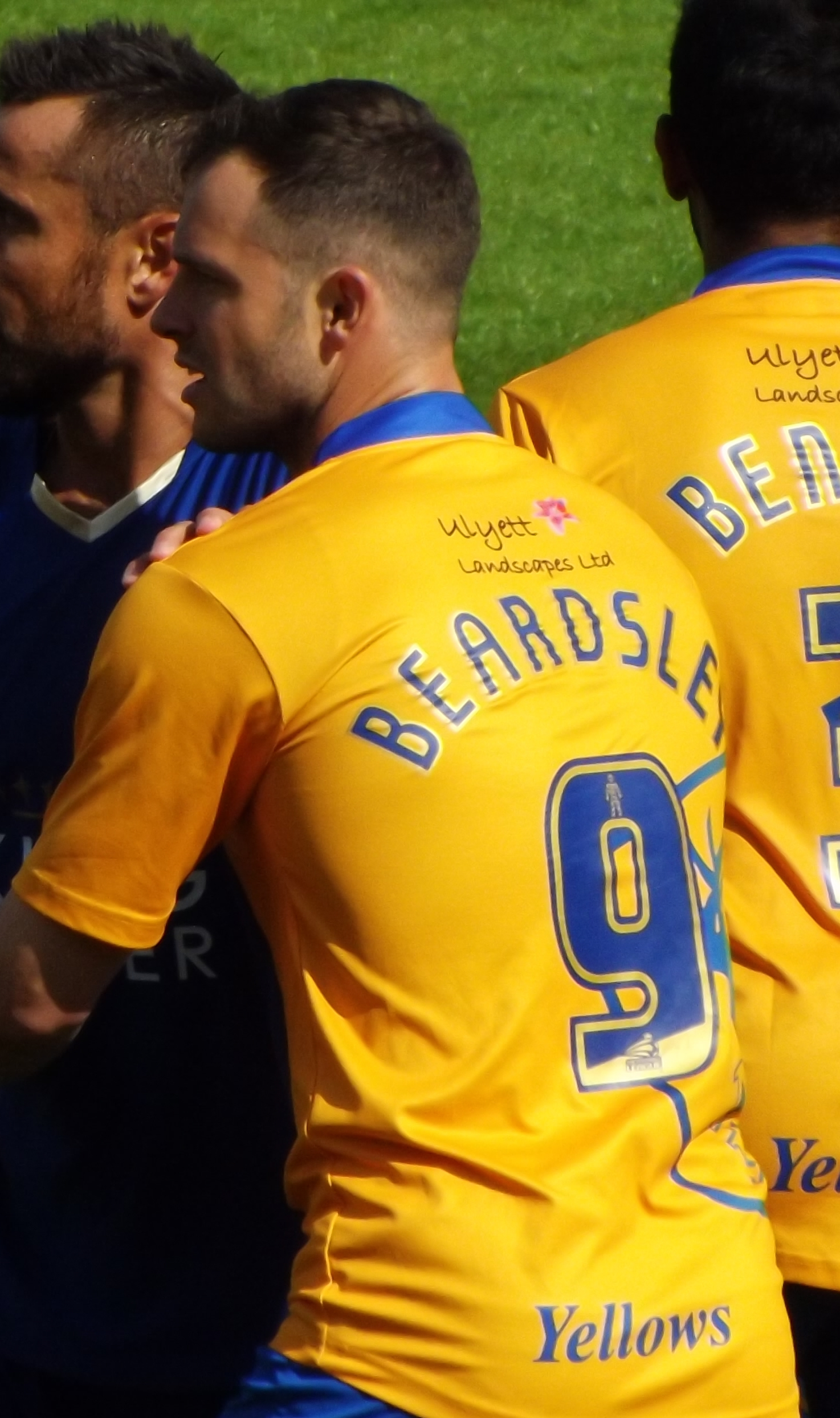
- Beardsley playing for Mansfield Town in 2015

Personal information
- Full name: Christopher Kellan Beardsley
- Date of birth: 28 February 1984 (age 42)
- Place of birth: Derby, England
- Height: 6 ft 0 in (1.83 m)
- Position: Striker

Youth career
- Mickleover Sports
- 1995–2000: Derby County
- 2000–2002: Mansfield Town

Senior career*
| Years | Team | Apps | (Gls) |
| 2002–2004 | Mansfield Town | 20 | (1) |
| 2004 | → Worksop Town (loan) | 3 | (1) |
| 2004 | Doncaster Rovers | 4 | (0) |
| 2004–2005 | Kidderminster Harriers | 25 | (5) |
| 2005–2007 | Mansfield Town | 13 | (0) |
| 2007 | → Rushden & Diamonds (loan) | 3 | (2) |
| 2007 | Rushden & Diamonds | 9 | (0) |
| 2007–2008 | York City | 8 | (0) |
| 2007–2008 | → Kettering Town (loan) | 5 | (5) |
| 2008–2009 | Kettering Town | 54 | (10) |
| 2008–2009 | → Kidderminster Harriers (loan) | 3 | (0) |
| 2009–2012 | Stevenage | 92 | (14) |
| 2012–2014 | Preston North End | 19 | (2) |
| 2013–2014 | → Bristol Rovers (loan) | 24 | (1) |
| 2014–2015 | Stevenage | 29 | (4) |
| 2015–2016 | Mansfield Town | 14 | (1) |
| 2018–2020 | Burton Albion | 1 | (0) |
| Total | | 326 | (46) |

Managerial career
- 2021: Burton Albion (caretaker)
- * Club domestic league appearances and goals

Christopher Kellan Beardsley (born 28 February 1984) is an English former professional footballer who played as a striker. He is a talent coach for FIFA.

Beardsley played youth football with Mickleover Sports and Derby County before starting his senior career with Mansfield Town, breaking into the first team in December 2002. After a loan spell at Worksop Town, he joined Doncaster Rovers in July 2004, then moved to Kidderminster Harriers later that year. Beardsley rejoined Mansfield in July 2005 but struggled for first-team opportunities and was loaned, then permanently transferred, to Conference National club Rushden & Diamonds in January 2007. Later that year, he joined York City but failed to establish himself in the team. He joined Kettering Town in December 2007, initially on loan, helping them secure promotion to the Conference Premier, and had a brief loan spell back at Kidderminster in November 2008.

He signed for Stevenage Borough in May 2009 and scored 22 goals in 117 appearances as the club earned back-to-back promotions from the Conference Premier to League One during his three years there. He left Stevenage to rejoin manager Graham Westley at Preston North End in August 2012. He struggled for appearances after a change in management, and spent much of the 2013–14 season on loan at Bristol Rovers. Beardsley returned to Stevenage in July 2014 and helped them to the 2014–15 League Two play-offs, before spending the following season at Mansfield. He retired in 2016, becoming a fitness coach at Burton Albion and briefly serving as caretaker manager in January 2021. He departed Burton in September 2023 to take up a role as a talent scout for FIFA in the Caribbean.

== Early life ==
He was born in Derby, Derbyshire, and attended Allestree Woodlands School from 1995 to 2000, followed by The Manor Academy from 2000 to 2003.

== Career ==
=== Early career ===
Beardsley played junior football for Mickleover Sports before joining the youth system of Derby County at age 11, where he remained for five years. Upon leaving school, he began a three-year scholarship at Mansfield Town in June 2000. Despite missing his second scholarship year due to a double stress fracture in his back, he returned to full training within six months and made his first-team debut aged 18 as a 57th-minute substitute in a 1–0 away defeat to Brentford on 28 December 2002. Beardsley made five appearances during the 2002–03 season, which ended with Mansfield's relegation to the Third Division. He signed a one-year professional contract on 4 July 2003, and scored his first career goal with a header in a 2–0 victory over York City on 11 October 2003.

In January 2004, Beardsley joined Northern Premier League Premier Division club Worksop Town on a one-month loan, having previously been a transfer target earlier in the season. He scored once in four appearances, with his goal coming in a 1–0 home victory against Blyth Spartans on 7 February 2004. Beardsley made 17 appearances and scored once for Mansfield during the 2003–04 season, which ended with a fifth-place finish in the Third Division, before being released in June 2004.

=== Doncaster Rovers and Kidderminster Harriers ===
Beardsley joined newly promoted League One club Doncaster Rovers on 19 July 2004 following a successful trial. He made his debut as a late substitute in a 4–3 away defeat to Brentford on 10 August 2004. His only goal for Doncaster came in a 1–0 Football League Trophy win against Lincoln City on 28 September 2004. After struggling to secure a regular first-team place, Beardsley signed for League Two club Kidderminster Harriers on 9 December 2004 until the end of the 2004–05 season. He debuted two days later and scored his first goal for the club in a 3–1 home defeat to Southend United on 3 January 2005. Beardsley made 25 appearances and scored 5 goals, as Kidderminster were relegated to the Conference National after finishing 23rd in League Two. He was offered a one-year contract extension in May 2005.

=== Return to Mansfield and Rushden & Diamonds ===
Beardsley held discussions with former club Mansfield Town about a return in May 2005, officially joining on 5 August 2005 for a £5,000 nominal fee, half of which was allocated to his former club Doncaster. He debuted as an 82nd-minute substitute in their 3–0 home win over Torquay United on 13 August 2005. His 2005–06 season was curtailed after four appearances when he sustained a broken leg in a collision with goalkeeper Kevin Pilkington during a 3–2 home defeat to Notts County on 29 August. Beardsley returned to the first team nearly a year later, coming on as an 88th-minute substitute in a 1–1 home draw with Stockport County on 12 August 2006. He scored his first goals of the 2006–07 season on 31 October 2006, scoring twice in a 3–0 Football League Trophy victory over Grimsby Town.

With appearances limited at Mansfield, Beardsley joined Conference National club Rushden & Diamonds on 19 January 2007 on a one-month loan. He debuted the following day in a 2–1 home victory against Stafford Rangers and scored his first goal in the subsequent match, with a 75th-minute header in a 3–1 home win over Cambridge United. After scoring twice in three matches, he signed permanently for Rushden on 31 January 2007 on a free transfer, agreeing a one-and-a-half-year contract. He made 13 appearances and scored 2 goals during the remainder of the 2006–07 season, as the club finished 12th in the Conference National. Beardsley was released in May 2007 following a change in management.

=== York City and Kettering Town ===
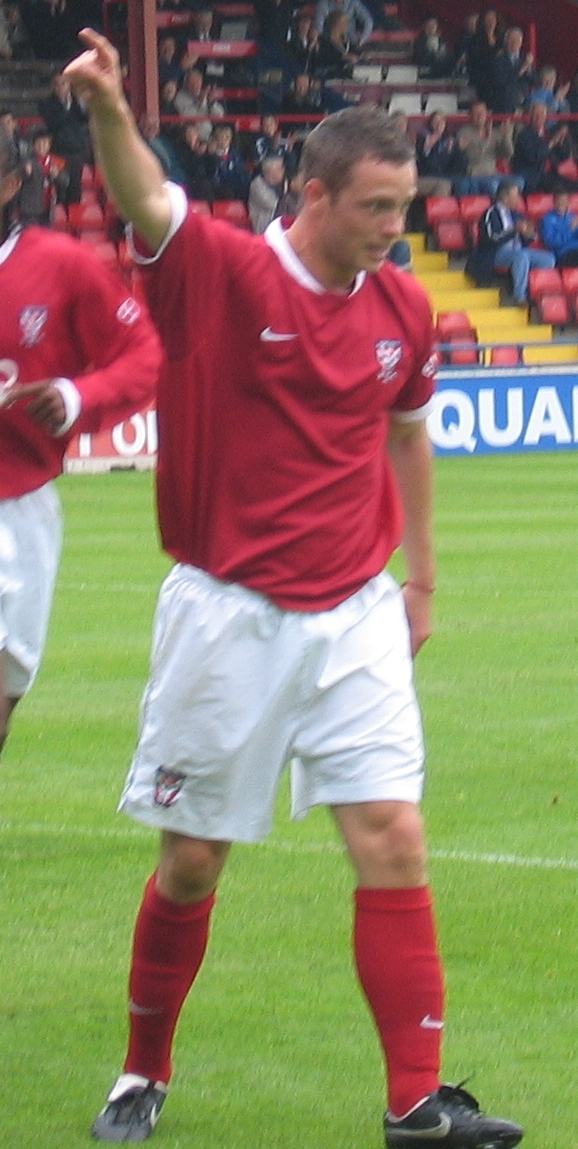
Beardsley playing for York City in 2007

Beardsley was signed by Conference Premier club York City on 19 June 2007, to provide competition for Richard Brodie, Craig Farrell and Onome Sodje. He made his debut as a starter in their 2–1 home defeat to Cambridge United on 11 August 2007, in which he was substituted on 62 minutes. Despite limited playing opportunities, Beardsley declined a loan move to Conference North club Tamworth in September 2007 in order to prove his worth at York. He sustained a double fracture of the jaw during York's 2–0 away win over Grays Athletic on 22 September 2007, after being elbowed by Jamie Stuart in an off-the-ball incident, which was likely to rule Beardsley out for at least three months. Essex Police confirmed they were making enquiries following the incident. He finished his York career with nine appearances.

To aid his return from injury, Beardsley joined Conference North club Kettering Town on 31 December 2007 on a one-month loan. He scored twice on his debut in a 6–1 home victory over Solihull Moors the following day, after which he was praised in the Northamptonshire Evening Telegraph for a "magnificent debut performance". Having scored 5 goals in as many appearances, he signed for Kettering permanently on 28 January 2008 on a free transfer, agreeing a one-and-a-half-year contract. He played in all of Kettering's remaining fixtures in the 2007–08 season, scoring 11 goals from 22 appearances, as the club won the Conference North title and secured promotion to the Conference Premier.

Having scored four goals in the first two months of the 2008–09 season, Beardsley rejoined former club Kidderminster on 27 November 2008 on a one-month loan, with a view to a permanent move. He made three appearances during the loan before being recalled by Kettering in January 2009. He primarily featured as a substitute for the remainder of the season, finishing with 44 appearances and 5 goals as Kettering placed eighth in the Conference Premier. Beardsley was released by the club in May 2009.

=== Stevenage ===
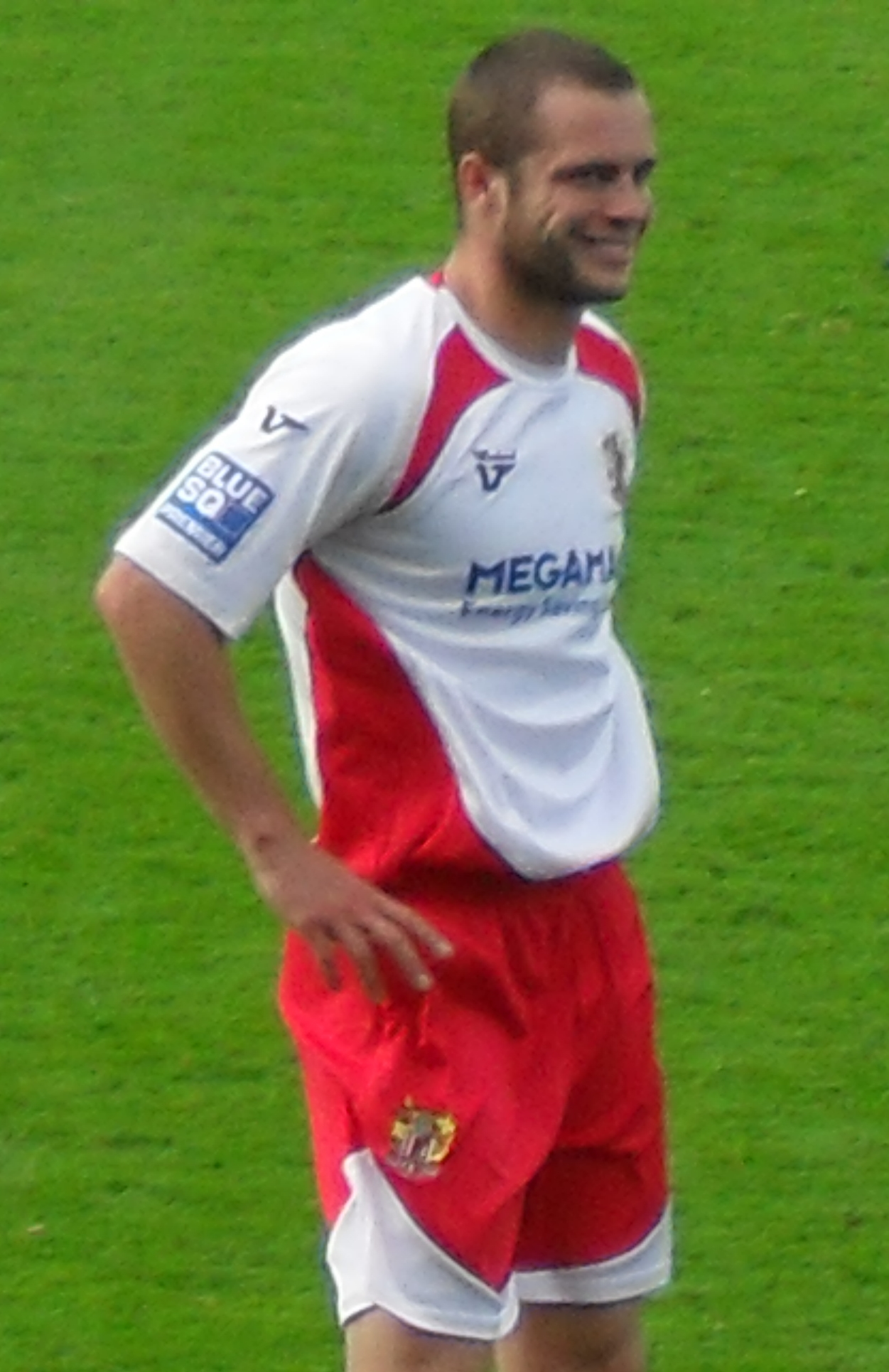
Beardsley playing for Stevenage Borough in 2009

Beardsley signed for Conference Premier club Stevenage Borough on 27 May 2009 on a one-year contract, reuniting with manager Graham Westley, who had previously signed him for Rushden. He scored on his debut in a 3–0 home victory over Ebbsfleet United on 18 August 2009. Beardsley scored 10 goals in 45 appearances during his debut season as Stevenage won the Conference Premier title, securing promotion to the Football League for the first time in their history. He also started the 2010 FA Trophy Final at Wembley Stadium on 8 May 2010, playing 66 minutes in a 2–1 extra-time defeat to Barrow.

He made his first appearance of the 2010–11 season in Stevenage's inaugural Football League match, coming on as a 60th-minute substitute in a 2–2 home draw with Macclesfield Town on 7 August 2010. Beardsley dislocated his shoulder in a 1–0 Football League Trophy defeat to Brentford on 31 August 2010, sidelining him for six weeks. Stevenage qualified for the play-offs with a sixth-place finish in League Two, and won the play-off semi-final against Accrington Stanley 3–0 on aggregate, with Beardsley scoring in the 90th minute of the second leg on 20 May 2011. He appeared as an 85th-minute substitute in the final at Old Trafford, where Stevenage beat Torquay United 1–0 to earn promotion to League One. Beardsley finished the season with 32 appearances, scoring 2 goals.

Beardsley made his first appearance of the 2011–12 season as a 95th-minute substitute in a League Cup tie against Peterborough United, scoring in extra time during a 4–3 defeat. He scored nine goals during the first half of the season, but his involvement thereafter was restricted by recurring hamstring injuries. Stevenage finished sixth in League One and were defeated 1–0 on aggregate by Sheffield United in the play-off semi-finals, with Beardsley appearing as a 63rd-minute substitute in the second leg. He finished the season as the club's top scorer with 10 goals in 40 appearances, and left in June 2012 after failing to agree terms on a new contract.

=== Preston North End ===
Beardsley joined League One club Preston North End on 12 August 2012 on a free transfer, reuniting with manager Graham Westley for the third time. Having trained with the team during pre-season, the move was delayed pending Football League clearance under new financial fair play regulations. He debuted two days later in a 2–0 League Cup win over Huddersfield Town, and scored his first goal on 4 September 2012 in a 1–1 draw with Carlisle United in the Football League Trophy, which Preston won on penalties. He scored his first goal in five months in a 3–1 away defeat to Yeovil on 12 February 2013, Westley's final match before being dismissed as manager. Beardsley made only two appearances under new manager Simon Grayson and was informed he could leave at the end of the season if a suitable offer was received. He finished the season with 3 goals from 22 appearances, as Preston placed 14th in League One.

Having failed to make an appearance for Preston in the opening months of the 2013–14 season, Beardsley joined League Two club Bristol Rovers on a one-month loan on 31 October 2013. He scored his first goal for the club in his second appearance, with a header in a 3–3 home draw with York in the FA Cup on 8 November 2013. Having scored two goals in four appearances, Beardsley's loan was extended on 22 November 2013, with the new agreement running until 5 January 2014. He received a red card for a late tackle in a 1–0 away defeat to Burton Albion, resulting in a one-match suspension. His loan was extended again on 6 January 2014, until the end of the 2013–14 season, with manager John Ward citing Beardsley's added value upfront. He finished the loan with 28 appearances and 3 goals, as Bristol Rovers were relegated to the Conference Premier after finishing 23rd in League Two. Beardsley was released by Preston upon the expiry of his contract in May 2014.

=== Return to Stevenage and third spell with Mansfield ===
Beardsley rejoined Westley for a fourth time when returning to Stevenage on 12 July 2014. After missing the start of the 2014–15 season due to injury, he made his first appearance since rejoining Stevenage on 16 September 2014, starting in a 2–1 away defeat to Bury. Beardsley's first goal came in a 3–2 away defeat to Portsmouth on 21 October 2014, capitalising on a defensive mistake to score in the 74th minute. He scored twice in Stevenage's 5–1 home win over Cheltenham Town on 15 November 2014 but then went five months without a goal, ending the goalless run in a 2–2 draw away to Accrington on 18 April 2015. Stevenage qualified for the play-offs with a sixth-place finish in League Two, with Southend their opponents in the semi-final. Beardsley started both matches, but Stevenage were eliminated 4–2 on aggregate, ending his season with 32 appearances and 4 goals. He was released in May 2015, with chairman Phil Wallace praising him for playing a key role in helping Stevenage establish itself as a Football League club under Westley.

Following his release, Beardsley rejoined Mansfield on 5 June 2015 for a third spell. He played regularly at the start of the 2015–16 season, but had a spell out of the team with a stress fracture in his shin. He suffered a broken nose on his return as an 89th-minute substitute in a 3–1 away win over Barnet on 28 November 2015, and continued to manage shin issues. Beardsley's first Mansfield goal in over nine years came on 30 January 2016 with a header from Mal Benning's corner on 60 minutes in a 1–0 away victory over Crawley. He concluded the 2015–16 season with 16 appearances and 1 goal as Mansfield finished 12th in League Two. He was released by the club in May 2016.

Having joined Burton Albion as a fitness coach, Beardsley was registered as a player in August 2018. He made a single appearance for the club as an 89th-minute substitute in a 2–2 draw away to Portsmouth on 23 October 2018.

== Style of play ==
Beardsley played as a striker and was praised by Stevenage teammate Mark Roberts as the "perfect man to lead the line" due to his strong work ethic.

== Coaching career ==
Beardsley earned his UEFA B Licence in 2009, UEFA A Licence in 2017, and UEFA Pro Licence in 2023. He began his coaching career when he was appointed fitness coach at Championship club Burton Albion on 7 July 2016. Alongside Nick Fenton, he served as joint caretaker manager for Burton's 5–1 home defeat to Oxford United on 2 January 2021. He left Burton in September 2023 after accepting a two-year appointment as a FIFA talent coach in the Caribbean, based in Aruba.

== Personal life ==
Beardsley studied sports journalism at Staffordshire University between 2008 and 2010, graduating with first-class honours. He also regularly contributed to a local newspaper in Stevenage. He is a supporter of his hometown club, Derby County.

== Career statistics ==
Appearances and goals by club, season and competition
| Club | Season | League | | | FA Cup | | League Cup | | Other | | Total | |
| Club | Season | Division | Apps | Goals | Apps | Goals | Apps | Goals | Apps | Goals | Apps | Goals |
|---|---|---|---|---|---|---|---|---|---|---|---|---|
| Mansfield Town | 2002–03 | Second Division | 5 | 0 | 0 | 0 | 0 | 0 | 0 | 0 | 5 | 0 |
| Mansfield Town | 2003–04 | Third Division | 15 | 1 | 1 | 0 | 0 | 0 | 1 (Note: Appearance(s) in Football League Trophy) | 0 | 17 | 1 |
| Mansfield Town | Total | | 20 | 1 | 1 | 0 | 0 | 0 | 1 | 0 | 22 | 1 |
| Worksop Town (loan) | 2003–04 | NPL Premier Division | 3 | 1 | — | | — | | 1 (Note: Appearance(s) in FA Trophy) | 0 | 4 | 1 |
| Doncaster Rovers | 2004–05 | League One | 4 | 0 | 1 | 0 | 1 | 0 | 2 | 1 | 8 | 1 |
| Kidderminster Harriers | 2004–05 | League Two | 25 | 5 | — | | — | | — | | 25 | 5 |
| Mansfield Town | 2005–06 | League Two | 3 | 0 | 0 | 0 | 1 | 0 | 0 | 0 | 4 | 0 |
| Mansfield Town | 2006–07 | League Two | 10 | 0 | 2 | 0 | 2 | 0 | 2 | 2 | 16 | 2 |
| Mansfield Town | Total | | 13 | 0 | 2 | 0 | 3 | 0 | 2 | 2 | 20 | 2 |
| Rushden & Diamonds | 2006–07 | Conference National | 12 | 2 | — | | — | | 1 | 0 | 13 | 2 |
| York City | 2007–08 | Conference Premier | 8 | 0 | 0 | 0 | — | | 1 | 0 | 9 | 0 |
| Kettering Town | 2007–08 | Conference North | 22 | 11 | — | | — | | — | | 22 | 11 |
| Kettering Town | 2008–09 | Conference Premier | 37 | 4 | 3 | 0 | — | | 4 (Note: Two appearances and one goal in Conference League Cup; two appearances in FA Trophy) | 1 | 44 | 5 |
| Kettering Town | Total | | 59 | 15 | 3 | 0 | 0 | 0 | 4 | 1 | 66 | 16 |
| Kidderminster Harriers (loan) | 2008–09 | Conference Premier | 3 | 0 | — | | — | | — | | 3 | 0 |
| Stevenage | 2009–10 | Conference Premier | 38 | 6 | 0 | 0 | — | | 7 | 4 | 45 | 10 |
| Stevenage | 2010–11 | League Two | 23 | 1 | 4 | 0 | 1 | 0 | 4 (Note: One appearance in Football League Trophy; three appearances and one goal in 2011 League Two play-offs) | 1 | 32 | 2 |
| Stevenage | 2011–12 | League One | 31 | 7 | 6 | 2 | 1 | 1 | 2 (Note: One appearance in Football League Trophy; one appearance in 2012 League One play-offs) | 0 | 40 | 10 |
| Stevenage | Total | | 92 | 14 | 10 | 2 | 2 | 1 | 13 | 5 | 117 | 22 |
| Preston North End | 2012–13 | League One | 19 | 2 | 0 | 0 | 2 | 0 | 1 | 1 | 22 | 3 |
| Preston North End | 2013–14 | League One | 0 | 0 | — | | 0 | 0 | 0 | 0 | 0 | 0 |
| Preston North End | Total | | 19 | 2 | 0 | 0 | 2 | 0 | 1 | 1 | 22 | 3 |
| Bristol Rovers (loan) | 2013–14 | League Two | 24 | 1 | 4 | 2 | — | | — | | 28 | 3 |
| Stevenage | 2014–15 | League Two | 29 | 4 | 1 | 0 | 0 | 0 | 2 (Note: Appearances in 2015 League Two play-offs) | 0 | 32 | 4 |
| Mansfield Town | 2015–16 | League Two | 14 | 1 | 0 | 0 | 1 | 0 | 1 | 0 | 16 | 1 |
| Burton Albion | 2018–19 | League One | 1 | 0 | 0 | 0 | 0 | 0 | 0 | 0 | 1 | 0 |
| Burton Albion | 2019–20 | League One | 0 | 0 | 0 | 0 | 0 | 0 | 1 (Note: Appearance in EFL Trophy) | 0 | 1 | 0 |
| Burton Albion | Total | | 1 | 0 | 0 | 0 | 0 | 0 | 1 | 0 | 2 | 0 |
| Career total | | | 326 | 46 | 22 | 4 | 9 | 1 | 30 | 10 | 387 | 61 |

== Managerial statistics ==
As of 2 January 2021

Managerial record by team and tenure
| Team | From | To | Record | | | | |
| Team | From | To | P | W | D | L | Win % |
|---|---|---|---|---|---|---|---|
| Burton Albion | 2 January 2021 | 2 January 2021 | 1 | 0 | 0 | 1 | 0.0 |
| Total | | | 1 | 0 | 0 | 1 | 0.0 |

== Honours ==
Kettering Town

- Conference North: 2007–08

Stevenage

- Conference Premier: 2009–10
- FA Trophy runner-up: 2009–10
- Football League Two play-offs: 2011
