= Alex Baptiste =

English footballer

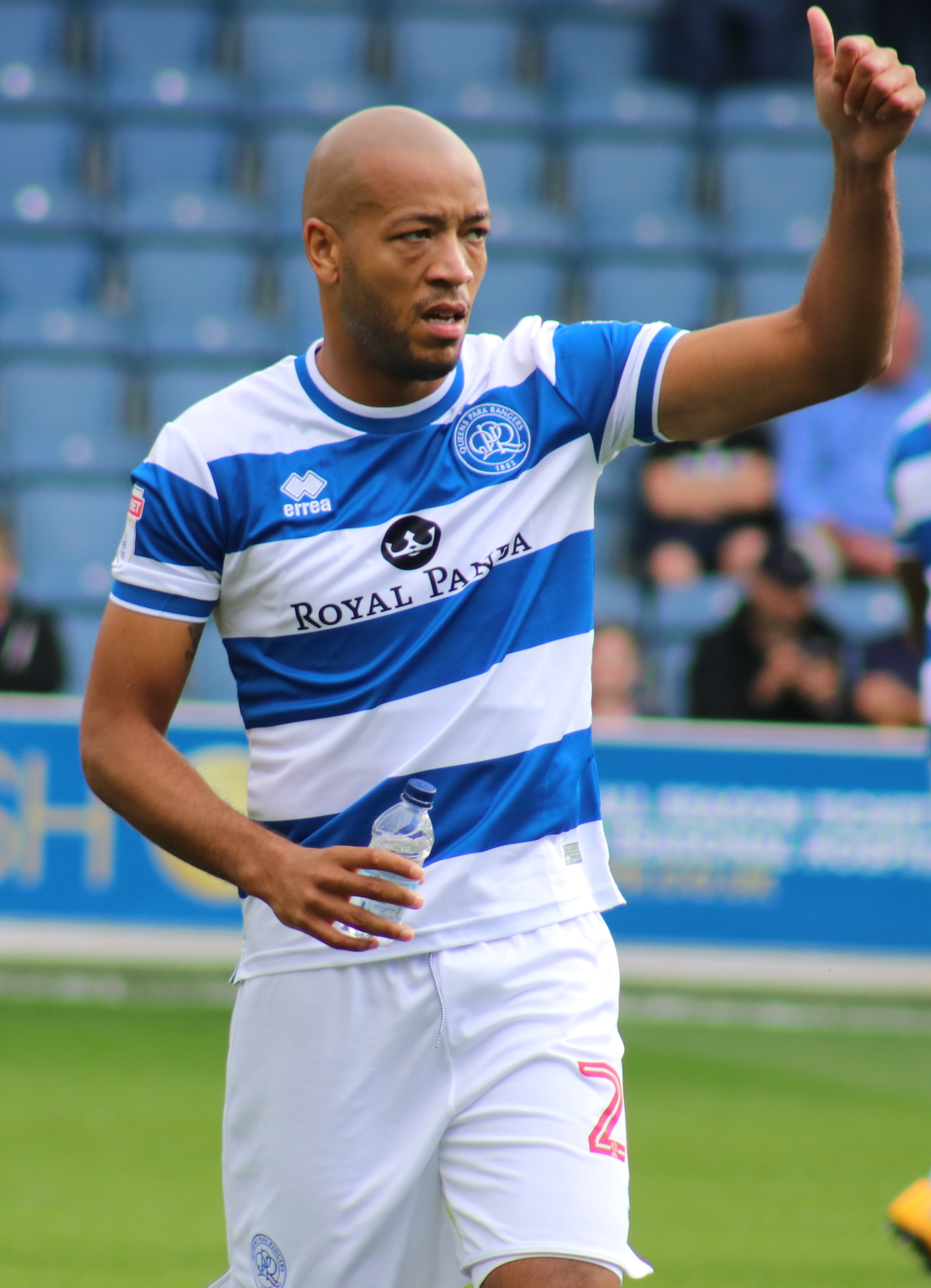
- Baptiste playing for Queens Park Rangers in 2017

Personal information
- Full name: Alexander Aaron John Baptiste
- Date of birth: 31 January 1986 (age 40)
- Place of birth: Sutton-in-Ashfield, England
- Height: 1.80 m (5 ft 11 in)
- Position: Defender

Youth career
- –2002: Mansfield Town

Senior career*
Years	Team	Apps	(Gls)
2002–2008	Mansfield Town	174	(5)
2003–2004	→ Tamworth (loan)	4	(0)
2004	→ Burton Albion (loan)	3	(0)
2008–2013	Blackpool	170	(8)
2013–2015	Bolton Wanderers	39	(4)
2014–2015	→ Blackburn Rovers (loan)	32	(3)
2015–2017	Middlesbrough	0	(0)
2016	→ Sheffield United (loan)	11	(1)
2016–2017	→ Preston North End (loan)	24	(3)
2017–2019	Queens Park Rangers	30	(0)
2019	→ Luton Town (loan)	2	(0)
2019–2020	Doncaster Rovers	2	(0)
2020–2022	Bolton Wanderers	52	(1)
2022	Waterford	5	(0)
Total		548	(25)
- * Club domestic league appearances and goals

Alexander Aaron John Baptiste (born 31 January 1986) is an English former professional footballer who played as a centre-back.

== Club career ==
=== Mansfield Town ===
Born in Sutton-in-Ashfield, Nottinghamshire, Baptiste came up through the youth team at Mansfield Town. He was originally a central midfielder before gradually dropping back into defence and made his first-team debut aged 17 against Barnsley in April 2003.

On 12 December 2003, he joined newly promoted Conference National side Tamworth on a one-month loan deal, making four league appearances, before returning to Mansfield on 12 January 2004. On 7 February he was sent out again on loan for a month, this time to Burton Albion, for whom he made four appearances.

Baptiste established himself as first-choice central defender for Mansfield Town towards the end of the 2003–04 season. He was ever-present during the 2006–07 season, and by the end of the campaign had made over 150 appearances for Mansfield. Baptiste signed a new three-year contract despite interest from Crewe Alexandra in the summer of 2007. However, he missed three months of the 2007–08 season with a back injury. After Mansfield Town were relegated to the Conference National at the end of the 2007–08 season, he requested a transfer, which was granted. He made a total of 198 appearances for the club in all competitions, scoring six goals.

=== Blackpool ===
On 1 July 2008, Baptiste agreed a deal to join Championship club Blackpool. Speaking about the move, he described it as a "great opportunity and challenge". He started the season as a regular in the Seasiders' reserve team, and for the first few months of the season he was not named in the first-team squad. He made his first-team debut on 22 November 2008 against Wolverhampton Wanderers at Molineux at right-back. He scored his first goal for the Seasiders in a 1–1 draw with Ipswich Town at Portman Road on 14 February 2009. Three days later he was named in the Football League's "Championship Team of the Week".

Baptiste cemented his place in the starting line up in the latter stages of the 2008–09 season, playing either centre back or right back. On 20 January 2010, after 27 appearances and two goals in the 2009–10 season, Baptiste signed a new two-and-a-half-year contract until June 2013. He said of the new contract: "I am very pleased. I had a good chat with the gaffer and Thommo and the direction of the club is upwards and I want to be a part of it." Blackpool manager Ian Holloway expressed his belief that Baptiste could play in the Premier League: "Baps has played at left-back, right-back and centre-back and he has been different class. I believe he can play in the Premiership and I have told him that. I am working on the areas that he needs working on, but as a defender I don't think I have had a better one and I am delighted he has signed."

On 14 August 2010, he scored as Blackpool marked their Premier League debut on the opening day of the 2010–11 season with a 4–0 win over Wigan Athletic at the DW Stadium. Baptiste scored the final goal of the game. He was subsequently named in the Premier League "Team of the Week", alongside teammate Marlon Harewood.

Baptiste played in the Championship play-off final against West Ham United in May 2012, which was won by West Ham 2–1. After the match Baptiste was vocal in his criticism of West Ham's style of football saying "They just hoof it, and hope for the best".

=== Bolton Wanderers ===
In May 2013, Baptiste signed a three-year deal with fellow Championship side Bolton Wanderers on a free transfer that took effect once his Blackpool contract expired on 30 June 2013. He made his debut for Bolton in their 1–1 draw with Lancashire rivals Burnley on 3 August 2013, operating in the right-back position. He recorded his first goal for Wanderers in the same month by scoring a consolation in the 4–1 away defeat at Blackburn Rovers. His first goal at the Reebok Stadium was Bolton's opener in their 2–2 draw against Derby County in an end to end game which saw Wanderers claim a share of the spoils.

Baptiste joined Blackburn on loan. He scored his first goal against Nottingham Forest. He scored his second goal for the club against Sheffield Wednesday.

=== Middlesbrough ===
On 6 July 2015, Baptiste joined Middlesbrough. On 11 July, he suffered a suspected double leg fracture, 20 minutes into a pre-season match against York City.

On 1 March 2016, Baptiste signed for Sheffield United on loan.

On 31 August 2016, he signed for Preston North End on a season-long loan. He scored his first goal for the club in a 2–2 draw with Birmingham City on 27 September 2016.

=== Queens Park Rangers ===
On 7 August 2017, Baptiste joined Queens Park Rangers on a free transfer.

On 31 January 2019, Baptiste joined Luton Town on a loan deal until the end of the 2018–19 season.

=== Doncaster Rovers ===
On 2 August 2019, Baptiste signed for Doncaster Rovers on a one-year contract. After only two matches he suffered an Achilles injury. He proceeded to miss the rest of the season through injury.

=== Return to Bolton Wanderers ===
On 7 August 2020, Baptiste re-signed for Bolton Wanderers, after five years away from the club, on a one-year deal. His second debut came on 5 September in Bolton's first match of the season, a 2–1 home defeat against Bradford in the first round of the EFL Cup. On 28 May 2021, he signed a new one-year contract. Baptiste passed 600 career appearances on 2 November 2021 in Bolton's 3–0 EFL Trophy win at Rochdale. On 3 May 2022, the club confirmed that he would be released at the end of his contract. He had been offered a player-coach role in Bolton's reserve team, though turned it down as he wanted to continue his career as a first team player.

=== Waterford ===
On 31 August 2022, Baptiste signed for League of Ireland First Division club Waterford until the end of their season in November. He played 11 times, though was unable to help them get promoted as they lost in the play-offs to UCD.

=== Retirement ===
Some time after leaving Waterford, Baptiste retired and became an agent.

== Career statistics ==
As of match played on 11 November 2022

Appearances and goals by club, season and competition
Club	Season	League			National Cup		League Cup		Other		Total	
Club	Season	Division	Apps	Goals	Apps	Goals	Apps	Goals	Apps	Goals	Apps	Goals
Mansfield Town	2002–03	Second Division	4	0	0	0	0	0	0	0	4	0
Mansfield Town	2003–04	Third Division	17	0	0	0	0	0	4 (Note: Appearances in the Football League Trophy and Third Division play-offs)	0	21	0
Mansfield Town	2004–05	League Two	41	1	2	1	1	0	2 (Note: Appearances in the Football League Trophy)	0	46	2
Mansfield Town	2005–06	League Two	41	1	3	0	3	0	1	0	48	1
Mansfield Town	2006–07	League Two	46	3	3	0	2	0	2	0	53	3
Mansfield Town	2007–08	League Two	25	0	1	0	0	0	0	0	26	0
Mansfield Town	Total		174	5	9	1	6	0	9	0	198	6
Tamworth (loan)	2003–04	Conference Premier	4	0	0	0	—		0	0	4	0
Burton Albion (loan)	2003–04	Conference Premier	3	0	0	0	—		1 (Note: Appearances in the FA Trophy)	0	4	0
Blackpool	2008–09	Championship	21	1	0	0	0	0	—		21	1
Blackpool	2009–10	Championship	42	3	1	0	3	0	3 (Note: Appearances in the Championship play-offs)	0	49	3
Blackpool	2010–11	Premier League	21	2	1	0	0	0	—		22	2
Blackpool	2011–12	Championship	43	1	3	0	0	0	3	0	49	1
Blackpool	2012–13	Championship	43	1	2	0	1	1	—		46	2
Blackpool	Total		170	8	7	0	4	1	6	0	187	9
Bolton Wanderers	2013–14	Championship	39	4	2	0	2	0	0	0	43	4
Blackburn Rovers (loan)	2014–15	Championship	32	3	2	0	0	0	0	0	34	3
Middlesbrough	2015–16	Championship	0	0	0	0	0	0	0	0	0	0
Middlesbrough	2016–17	Premier League	0	0	0	0	1	0	0	0	1	0
Middlesbrough	Total		0	0	0	0	1	0	0	0	1	0
Sheffield United (loan)	2015–16	League One	11	1	0	0	0	0	0	0	11	1
Preston North End (loan)	2016–17	Championship	24	3	0	0	0	0	0	0	24	3
Queens Park Rangers	2017–18	Championship	26	0	1	0	1	0	0	0	28	0
Queens Park Rangers	2018–19	Championship	4	0	0	0	3	0	0	0	7	0
Queens Park Rangers	Total		30	0	1	0	4	0	0	0	35	0
Luton Town (loan)	2018–19	League One	2	0	0	0	0	0	0	0	2	0
Doncaster Rovers	2019–20	League One	2	0	0	0	0	0	0	0	2	0
Bolton Wanderers	2020–21	League Two	40	0	1	0	1	0	0	0	42	0
Bolton Wanderers	2021–22	League One	12	1	1	0	1	0	4	0	18	1
Bolton Wanderers	Total		52	1	2	0	2	0	4	0	60	1
Waterford	2022	League of Ireland First Division	5	0	2	0	—		4 (Note: Appearances in League of Ireland promotion/relegation playoffs)	0	11	0
Career total			548	25	25	1	19	1	24	0	616	27

== Honours ==
Blackpool

- Football League Championship play-offs: 2010

Bolton Wanderers

- EFL League Two third-place promotion: 2020–21

Individual

- Blackpool Player of the Season: 2011–12
