= Giles Coke =

English footballer (born 1986)

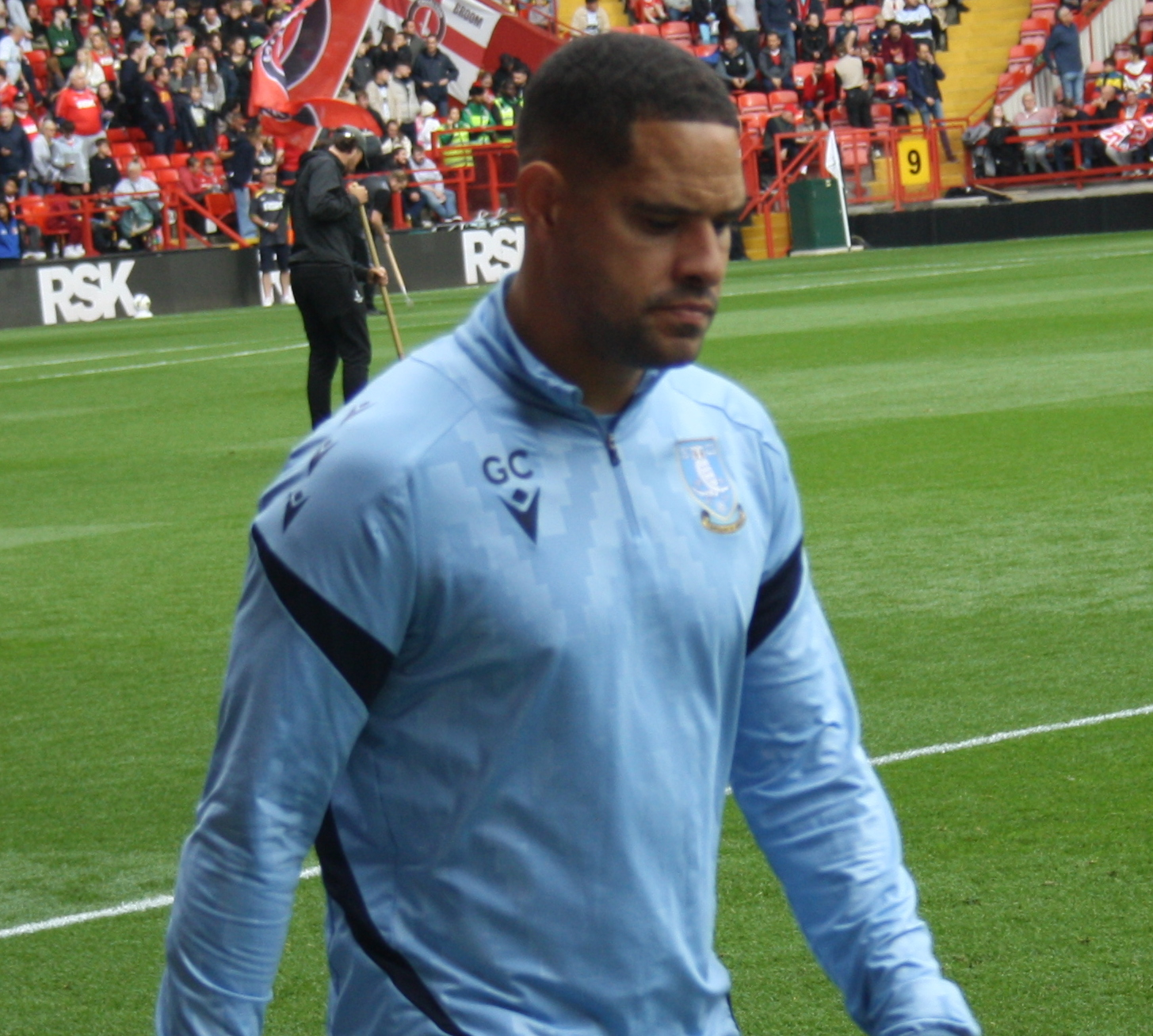
- Giles Coke in 2025.

Personal information
- Full name: Giles Christopher Coke
- Date of birth: 3 June 1986 (age 40)
- Place of birth: Westminster, England
- Height: 6 ft 0 in (1.83 m)
- Position: Midfielder

Team information
- Current team: Sheffield Wednesday (U21 coach)

Youth career
- 2002–2004: Queens Park Rangers

Senior career*
Years	Team	Apps	(Gls)
2004–2005	Kingstonian	28	(5)
2005–2007	Mansfield Town	70	(5)
2007–2009	Northampton Town	52	(7)
2009–2010	Motherwell	32	(2)
2010–2015	Sheffield Wednesday	84	(6)
2011–2012	→ Bury (loan)	30	(6)
2012–2013	→ Swindon Town (loan)	4	(0)
2015	→ Bolton Wanderers (loan)	4	(0)
2015–2017	Ipswich Town	10	(0)
2018	Chesterfield	2	(0)
2018–2020	Oldham Athletic	4	(0)
2020–2021	Hereford	9	(0)
2021–2022	Grimsby Town	40	(1)
Total		369	(26)
- * Club domestic league appearances and goals

Giles Christopher Coke (born 3 June 1986) is an English professional football coach and former player who is currently a U-21 coach at EFL League One club Sheffield Wednesday.

As a player, he was a midfielder who most notably featured at EFL Championship level for Sheffield Wednesday, Bolton Wanderers and Ipswich Town and in the Scottish Premier League for Motherwell. He has also appeared professionally for Mansfield Town, Northampton Town, Bury, Swindon Town, Chesterfield, Oldham Athletic and Grimsby Town, as well as non-league sides Kingstonian and Hereford.

Following retirement in 2022 he became a youth team development coach at Grimsby Town, before leaving at the end of the 2022–23 season. He joined his old club Sheffield Wednesday as U18 assistant coach in January 2024.

== Playing career ==
=== Early career ===
Coke began his career as a youth player at Queens Park Rangers in 2003, before teaming up with his older brother Jon at non-league side Kingstonian a year later.

=== Mansfield Town ===
Coke was soon snapped up by Mansfield Town and signed his first professional contract on 31 March 2005. He scored his first goal for the club in the second round of the League Cup in the 1–0 win against Southampton, which still heralds fond memories for Coke. He then went on to score two goals in two appearances against Leyton Orient and Shrewsbury Town respectively, before being linked with several Championship League clubs, including: Southampton, Reading, Norwich City and Wolverhampton Wanderers.

In April 2006, Coke turned down a new two-year contract with Mansfield, but was persuaded by manager Peter Shirtliff to sign a one-year contract to remain at Field Mill for another year. However, during the 2006/7 season, Coke suffered an injury that sidelined him for most of the season. His misfortune continued the following season, which resulted in limited appearances for the club. Despite this, Coke had still impressed enough to entice other clubs; most notably Wycombe Wanderers, to want to sign him.

=== Northampton Town ===
He signed for Northampton Town on 2 July 2007 on a two-year contract after rejecting a new contract from Mansfield Town. A Football League tribunal on 24 September 2007 ruled that Northampton must pay Mansfield a maximum fee of £70,000 (depending on appearances) for the transfer, as well as a sell on clause of 20%.

Coke remained on the sideline at the start of the season after having a further operation. In early October, Coke was showing signs of recovery and of being fully fit to make a return to training. To gain match fitness, Coke played his first for Northampton Town in reserve for 56 minutes, as they beat Southend United, which met the delight of the club's reserve coach Ian Sampson, who believed "his confidence will be sky high at the moment." Despite potential debut after playing in the reserves, his league debut was delayed once again when he sustained a groin injury and would be out for three weeks following an operation. After being on the sideline, Coke made his debut for the club, coming on for Andy Kirk in the 58th minute and was booked, as Northampton Town lost 3–2 to Leeds United on 5 January 2008. Since his debut, Coke quickly made an impact and insists he was not a "next Bradley Johnson." Coke scored his first goal for the club, in a 2–0 win over Leyton Orient on 25 January 2008. Coke scored four more goals later in the 2007–08 season against Gillingham, Hartlepool United, Cheltenham Town and Oldham Athletic.

Coke kick-started the 2008-09 scoring in a 2–1 win over Swindon Town on 21 October 2008. After doubling his goalscoring tally in a 4–4 draw against Scunthorpe United on 13 December 2008, Coke sustained a calf injury that sidelined him for the remainder of the season.

Due to Coke's good performance for Northampton, he was offered a new contract by the club and signed a contract with the club on 16 June 2009. However, Coke reportedly turned down a new contract for 'The Cobblers', announcing he would leave the club on a free transfer.

=== Motherwell ===
Coke's contract with Northampton expired in the summer of 2009. On 21 July, he signed a one-year contract with Scottish Premier League club Motherwell, becoming new manager Jim Gannon's third signing.

Coke made his European debut for the club against Steaua București but they proved to be too strong for The Steelmen after their lost 5–1 on aggregate. Coke made his league debut for the club in the opening game of the season, where he set up one of Ross Forbes's goals in a 2–2 draw against St Johnstone on 15 August 2009.

He opened his scoring account for Motherwell, after netting twice a thrilling 6–6 draw against Hibernian on 5 May 2010. Coke was a regular fixture for The Steelmen, and enjoyed his time at Fir Park. He was offered a new contract with the club, but moved back to England to sign for Sheffield Wednesday in July 2010.

=== Sheffield Wednesday ===
Coke signed for Sheffield Wednesday under freedom of contract in July 2010. Coke made his debut for Sheffield Wednesday in a 2–0 victory over Dagenham & Redbridge on 7 August 2010. Three days later, he scored his first goal for the club in a 1–0 win over Bury in the first round of League Cup. Coke went to make 27 appearances for the club and scoring 4 including against Brighton & Hove Albion, Hartlepool United, Rochdale and Plymouth Argyle.

Following loan spells at Bury and Swindon Town, Coke returned to the Wednesday first team in January 2013, marking his first league appearance for the Owls since April 2011 with a 3–1 win over Hull City. His performances in the second half of the 2012–13 season earned Coke a new contract, signing a two-year contract extension with the Owls in June 2013.

Coke scored the first goal of the 2014–15 season, after The Owls beat Brighton & Hove Albion 1–0. As a result of his performance, Coke was named in the Football League Team of the Week. Coke's goal was later named as Sheffield Wednesday's Goal of 2014. He was released by Sheffield Wednesday at the end of the 2014–15 season.

After one season at Hillsborough, Coke went on loan to Bury until January 2012. That was later extended until the end of the 2011–12 season. Coke made his debut for Bury in a 4–0 loss against Sheffield United on 3 September 2011. On 1 October 2011, Coke scored his first goal for Bury in a 3–1 victory over Yeovil Town. On 21 January 2012, Coke was in a row with captain Steven Schumacher over who should take a penalty. Shortly after, both players were booked. Eventually, Schumacher took the penalty and scored to make it 3–0. The match ended 3–2 victory over Yeovil Town. 3 days later after Bury match, Coke apologised privately to the team, the captain, and the manager. Following that incident, Coke went on to become a fan's favourite at Gigg Lane due to the superb performances he put in for the Shakers in their fight for League 1 survival. However, he was unable to return to Bury for a second time once his loan spell with the club ended.

On 31 August 2012, Coke signed for Swindon on loan from Sheffield Wednesday until January 2013. He made his debut for the club, coming on for Simon Ferry in the 70th minute, in a 2–2 draw against Carlisle United on 15 September 2012. After making four appearances, Coke returned to his parent club on 5 October 2012.

On 5 March 2015, Coke joined Bolton Wanderers on an emergency loan deal until the end of the 2014–15 season. He made his Bolton Wanderers debut on 11 March 2015, in a 1–0 loss against Blackburn Rovers. In total, he made four appearances for the club before returning to his parent club.

=== Ipswich Town ===
On 3 August 2015, Coke joined Ipswich Town on a two-year deal. He made his Blues' debut against Manchester United at Old Trafford in the Carling Cup. He was released by the club in the summer 2017.

=== Chesterfield ===
Coke joined Chesterfield on 1 February 2018 on a deal until the end of the season. His contract was not renewed by Chesterfield at the end of the 2017–18 season.

=== Oldham Athletic ===
During the close-season, Coke joined Oldham Athletic on trial and featured in two friendly matches. On 16 July 2018, he signed a two-year contract with the club. Playing only four times in two seasons, Coke later attributed his lack of appearances at Oldham as problems with the club's owner, although not elaborating on the details he says his absence was not down to injury.

=== Hereford ===
After a successful trial, Coke joined National League North club Hereford on 17 September 2020, dropping into Non-League for the first time in his career. During January 2021, Coke began training with Grimsby Town with a view of returning to the Football League and professional football. On 29 January, Hereford announced that they had waived the seven day notice period effectively releasing him to allow him to sign for Grimsby. Having not signed for Grimsby on the Transfer Deadline day on 1 February, manager Paul Hurst announced that he had yet to make a final decision and that Coke was still training with The Mariners.

On 4 February 2021, Paul Hurst announced a registration issue that saw Coke still registered to the League would prevent him from signing for Grimsby. The player was under the impression he had been released but his League registration meant a deal would have had to have been done prior to the transfer window.

=== Grimsby Town ===
On 12 February 2021, Coke joined Grimsby Town on a deal until the end of the 2020–21 season, having been allowed to join the club after speaking to the National League in order to terminate his registration with them.

After impressing over his 17 games in the 2020–21 season, Coke was offered and duly signed a one-year contract extension on 9 June 2021.

Coke was named as Grimsby's club captain for the 2021–22 season, saying "I am really happy about it - it shows the manager believes in me. Even if I don't play every game, I will always try to help everyone in the team as much as I can, so we can all be successful. Even though I am captain, I also see some of the others as captains as well in a way. There are others who can add similar things to the team and just because I am wearing the armband doesn't mean they haven't got an input."

Grimsby secured promotion with victory in the play-off final, though Coke was not in the matchday squad at London Stadium.

On 11 June 2022, following promotion back to the Football League the club announced their retained list ahead of the 2022–23 season and confirmed that Coke would be among those released when his contract expires on 30 June.

== Coaching career ==
Following the end of his playing contract, Coke made an immediate return to Grimsby Town as a development coach.

Grimsby chairman Jason Stockwood hailed Coke on his appointment saying "I've been working with Giles on a couple of projects outside his playing. I'm trying to think of how you help players transition post their football careers. What he did for us last year in the locker room was pretty clear and Paul couldn't speak highly [enough] of him as a character, as a professional. So that was the first thing. And then we've had some interactions around just trying to think about how we help people transition with all the skills that they've got that are transferable. We haven't got an answer for that yet. But Giles showed great capacity and intellect for taking stuff on beyond the playing side of the game. Neil Woods and the staff at the academy are doing an amazing job at developing players. But we thought: 'how do we bridge that gap between the development players and the first team? So Paul came to us with that recommendation. It was an easy yes with the sort of character he is, the way that Paul thinks he can play a positive influence on the first team squad as well, it seemed like an easy yes for us."

On 12 July 2022, Coke played for Grimsby in a 6-1 behind the closed doors friendly victory over Hull City U23s.

It was announced that Coke would depart his coaching role at Grimsby at the end of the 2022–23 season.

He rejoined Sheffield Wednesday as an assistant coach to the U18 side in 2024, later becoming the U21 manager. In July 2025, with first-team manager Danny Röhl not returning for pre-season training, Coke was asked to take training for the first-team alongside fellow academy coach Andy Holdsworth. Following the appointment of Henrik Pedersen as first team manager, he would take on a full time coaching role with the first team as well as manager of the club’s Under-21s. After Pedersen left the club and Dave Challinor was appointed new manager, Coke returned to his role of coaching the U21 side.

== Career statistics ==
Appearances and goals by club, season and competition
Club	Season	League			National Cup		League Cup		Other		Total	
Club	Season	Division	Apps	Goals	Apps	Goals	Apps	Goals	Apps	Goals	Apps	Goals
Kingstonian	2004–05	IL Premier Division	28	5	1	0	—		3 (Note: One appearance and one goal in FA Trophy; two appearances in Surrey Senior Cup)	1	32	6
Mansfield Town	2004–05	League Two	9	0	0	0	0	0	0	0	9	0
Mansfield Town	2005–06	League Two	40	4	3	1	3	1	1 (Note: Appearance(s) in Football League Trophy)	0	47	6
Mansfield Town	2006–07	League Two	21	1	3	0	1	0	1	0	26	1
Mansfield Town	Total		70	5	6	1	4	1	2	0	82	7
Northampton Town	2007–08	League One	20	5	0	0	0	0	0	0	20	5
Northampton Town	2008–09	League One	32	2	1	0	3	0	1	0	37	2
Northampton Town	Total		52	7	1	0	3	0	1	0	57	7
Motherwell	2009–10	Scottish Premiership	32	2	1	0	2	0	0	0	35	2
Sheffield Wednesday	2010–11	League One	27	4	3	0	1	1	3	0	34	5
Sheffield Wednesday	2011–12	League One	0	0	0	0	2	0	1	0	3	0
Sheffield Wednesday	2012–13	Championship	16	0	0	0	2	0	—		18	0
Sheffield Wednesday	2013–14	Championship	28	1	2	0	0	0	—		30	1
Sheffield Wednesday	2014–15	Championship	13	1	0	0	3	0	—		16	1
Sheffield Wednesday	Total		84	6	5	0	8	1	4	0	101	7
Bury (loan)	2011–12	League One	30	6	0	0	0	0	0	0	30	6
Swindon Town (loan)	2012–13	League One	4	0	0	0	0	0	1	0	5	0
Bolton Wanderers (loan)	2014–15	Championship	4	0	0	0	0	0	—		4	0
Ipswich Town	2015–16	Championship	10	0	1	0	3	0	—		14	0
Ipswich Town	2016–17	Championship	0	0	0	0	0	0	—		0	0
Ipswich Town	Total		10	0	1	0	3	0	0	0	14	0
Chesterfield	2017–18	League Two	2	0	0	0	0	0	0	0	2	0
Oldham Athletic	2018–19	League Two	4	0	0	0	1	0	0	0	5	0
Oldham Athletic	2019–20	League Two	0	0	0	0	0	0	0	0	0	0
Oldham Athletic	Total		4	0	0	0	1	0	0	0	5	0
Hereford	2020–21	National League North	9	0	0	0	—		2 (Note: Appearances in FA Trophy)	0	11	0
Grimsby Town	2020–21	League Two	17	0	0	0	0	0	0	0	17	0
Grimsby Town	2021–22	National League	23	1	1	0	0	0	1	0	25	1
Grimsby Town	Total		40	1	1	0	0	0	1	0	42	1
Career total			369	32	16	1	21	2	14	1	420	36

== Honours ==
Sheffield Wednesday

- Football League One runner-up: 2011–12

Grimsby Town

- National League play-offs: 2022

Individual

- Football League One Player of the Month: August 2010
