= Stephen Dawson =

Irish footballer (born 1985)

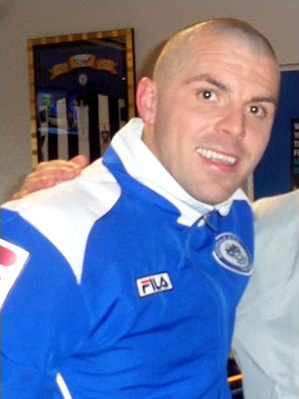
- Dawson in 2015

Personal information
- Full name: Stephen John Dawson
- Date of birth: 4 December 1985 (age 40)
- Place of birth: Dublin, Ireland
- Position: Midfielder

Youth career
- ?–2003: Leicester City

Senior career*
Years	Team	Apps	(Gls)
2003–2005	Leicester City	0	(0)
2005–2008	Mansfield Town	117	(4)
2008–2010	Bury	88	(6)
2010–2012	Leyton Orient	60	(3)
2012–2014	Barnsley	81	(5)
2014–2015	Rochdale	30	(0)
2015–2017	Scunthorpe United	66	(1)
2017–2019	Bury	18	(0)
2019–2020	Hereford	12	(0)
2020	Radcliffe	3	(0)
Total		475	(19)

International career
2005–2006	Republic of Ireland U21	2	(0)
- * Club domestic league appearances and goals

Stephen John Dawson (born 4 December 1985) is an Irish former professional footballer. He primarily played as a central midfielder, although he was also deployed in defensive midfield. He was noted for his aggressive and highly competitive style of play. At international level, Dawson represented the Republic of Ireland national football team at Under-21 level on two occasions.

Dawson began his career with Leicester City before moving to Mansfield Town in 2005, where he made 131 appearances in all competitions. He later played for Bury, Leyton Orient, Barnsley, Rochdale and Scunthorpe United before returning to Bury in May 2017. After an injury hit second spell with the club, he finished his career in non-league football with Hereford and Radcliffe.

== Early career ==
Dawson was born on 4 December 1985 in Dublin. He started his career as a trainee at Leicester City, having joined from the Dublin schoolboy team Portmarnock AFC. Before that, he spent 7 years with St Malachys FC and although he became a regular in the reserve side, he did not graduate to the first-team. He subsequently rejected an offer for a new contract on reduced terms in May 2005.

== Club career ==
=== Mansfield Town ===
Dawson joined Mansfield Town in the summer of 2005, signing a two–year contract.

After suffering a sore thigh and shortly recovered in the pre–season, Dawson scored on his debut against Stockport County in the opening game of the season on 6 August 2005. Since making his debut, he established himself in the first team regular at Mansfield Town, playing in midfield positions. Despite suffering from a groin strain, he finished his first season at Mansfield Town, making the total of 45 appearances and scoring once.

In the 2006–07 season, Dawson continued to remain in the first team regular for the side and was very fortunate to avoid a red card in a 2–1 win over MK Dons on 8 August 2006 after he "was first booked just before the break for a foul and then appeared to be shown a second a minute from time after lengthy protests over referee Kevin Wright's decision not to award him a penalty. But Dawson was not automatically red-carded and was substituted a minute later." After suffering injuries on three occasions throughout 2006, After returning to the first team in January, Dawson then scored his first goal of the season on 16 January 2007, in a 3–2 loss against Accrington Stanley. Despite suffering another injury later in the season, Dawson, nevertheless, made the total of 37 appearances and scoring once in all competitions.

Ahead of the 2007–08 season, Dawson signed a new one-year contract on 10 August 2007 and his handful of first team appearances resulted him being praised for his work rate by Manager Bill Dearden. Under Dearden, Dawson played in the 4–3–3 formation, where he was in the midfield position. He then scored his first Mansfield Town goal of the season, in a 3–1 loss against Chesterfield on 15 September 2007. His second goal of the season came on 16 February 2008, in a 2–1 win over Darlington. Despite suffering the setbacks during the season, At the end of the 2007–08 season, which saw them relegated from Dawson made the total of 49 appearances and scoring two times in all competitions.

After Mansfield Town were relegated to the Football Conference at the end of the 2007–08 season, he was out of contract, but rejected it. By the time Dawson's Mansfield Town career came to an end, he had made over 125 appearances in all competitions for Mansfield Town. While at the club, Dawson was considered "tough tackling midfielder" and "a constant performer for Stags in the centre of the park."

=== Bury ===
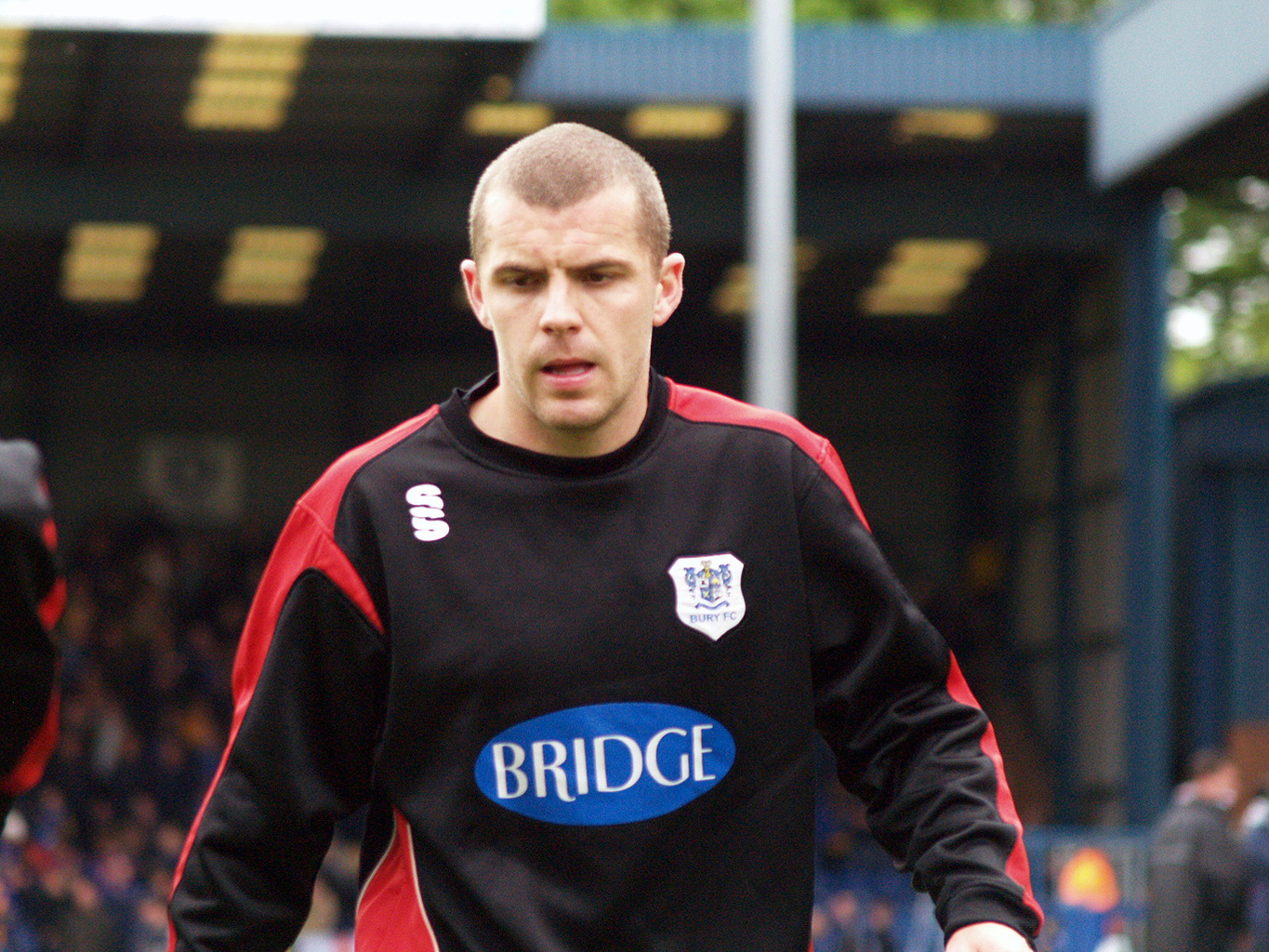
Dawson playing for Bury

Shortly after rejecting a new contract at Mansfield Town, Dawson joined Bury on a two-year contract on 30 June 2008. Upon joining Bury, Dawson said he would improve as a player and hope to score more goals on a regular basis.

Dawson made his Bury debut on 9 August 2008 on the opening day of the season with a 1–0 win over Brentford at Gigg Lane. Since making his debut for the side, Dawson quickly established himself in the first team, partnering with Brian Barry-Murphy in central midfield. He then scored his first goal for Bury on 18 October 2008 in a 3–1 win at Dagenham & Redbridge. After being suspended against Darlington in the Football League Trophy campaign for picking up his fifth yellow card this season, Dawson returned to the first team and it wasn't until on 6 December 2008 when he scored again, in a 1–1 draw against Macclesfield Town. However, in a 1–0 defeat against Brentford on 28 February 2009, Dawson was sent–off for a second bookable offence. Up until his sending off, Dawson started every match for the side since the start of the season. Despite being suspended for the second time this season, the club was unsuccessful to reach promotion to League One. Nevertheless, Dawson was awarded 4 awards: Bury Times Player of the Year, Disabled Supporters Player of the Season, Billy Ayre Memorial Official Website Player of the Season, and Forever Bury Player of the Season. Manager Knill praised Dawson's role this season at Bury. In his first season at Bury, Dawson made the total of 47 appearances and scoring 2 times in all competitions.

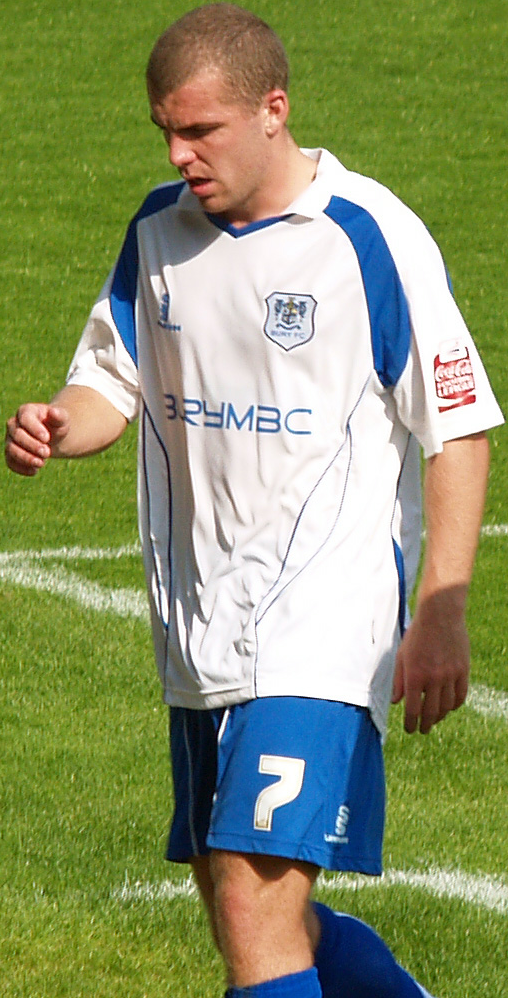
Dawson representing Bury in the club's away game in July 2008

In the 2009–10 season, Manager Knill expected Dawson to emulate and improve on his second season at Bury. However, in a 1–0 loss against Cheltenham Town on 12 September 2009, Dawson was at fault when he gave away the ball, leading opposition player Barry Hayles, who scored the winning and only goal for the side. After the match, Dawson made an apology to Bury's supporters for his role. Despite this, Dawson managed to fend off his mistake and scored his first goal of the season on 29 September 2009, in a 3–2 win over Crewe Alexandra. Three weeks later, on 17 October 2009, he scored again, in a 3–2 win over Aldershot Town. His third goal then came on 14 November 2009, in a 3–3 draw against Notts County. Dawson continuously formed a central midfield partnership with Barry-Murphy. By December, he was offered a new contract by the club. However, he turned down a new contract, citing his ambitions to play in the higher division. Despite this, Manager Knill said Dawson remained the key player for the side. It wasn't until on 17 January 2010 when Dawson scored again, in a 2–1 win over Bournemouth. At some point to the season, he was appointed captain at Bury, succeeding Paul Scott and previously captained the side the previous season. Since the start of the season, Dawson played in every match until he was sidelined over personal reason in March 2010, missing one league match against Macclesfield Town. Despite this, Dawson went on to finish his second season, making the total of 47 appearances and scoring 4 times in all competitions. At the end of the 2009–10 season, Dawson was again awarded the club's Player of the Year and was voted into the PFA League Two Team of The Year for the 2009–10 season at the PFA awards.

With his contract coming to an end in the summer of 2010, Dawson was offered a new contract by the club. However, Knill conceded defeat in attempt to keep Dawson, as it was made clear that he wanted to leave Bury to play at the higher level. By the time he departed Bury, Dawson went on to make the total of 97 appearances and scoring 6 times during his two years stay. Reflecting on his time at Bury, Dawson said he had to leave the club, saying: "I felt I had to move from Bury because, like in any job, I am not happy just to pick up a wage. I want to do well in my career and keep progressing to play at a higher level."

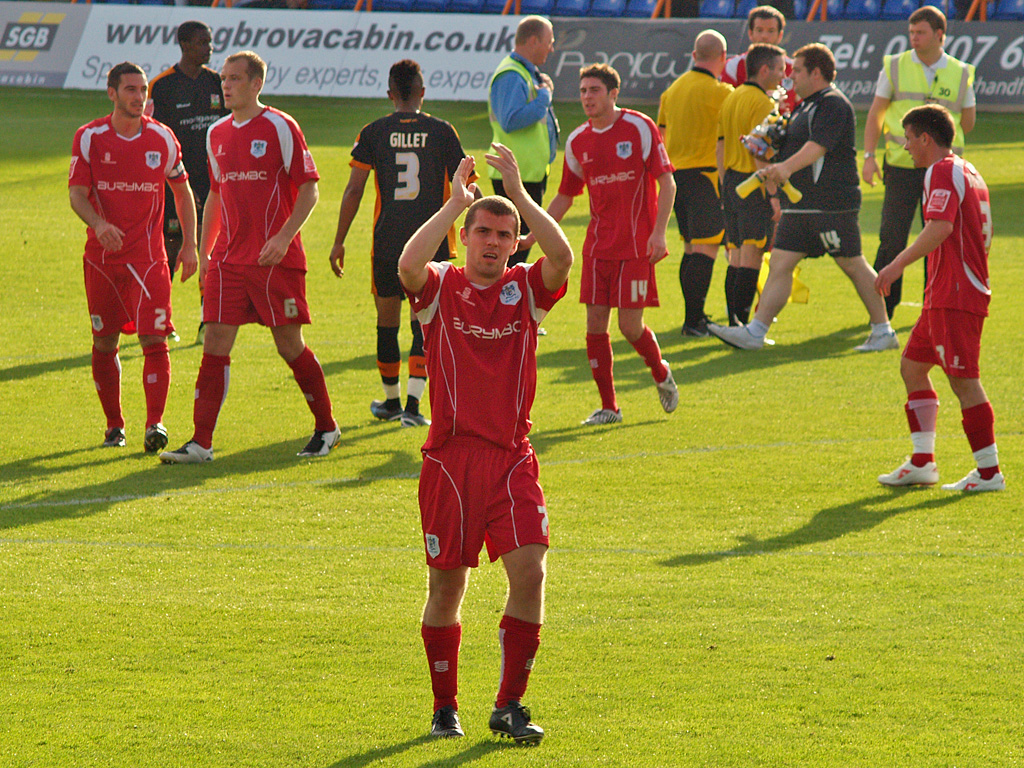
Dawson representing Bury in the club's away game in September 2008

=== Leyton Orient ===
On 4 June 2010 he signed for League One side Leyton Orient, signing a two–year contract for the side. Upon joining the club, he was given a number 8 shirt ahead of the new season and also became Leyton Orient's Captain, succeeding Stephen Purches.

Dawson made his Leyton Orient debut, starting the whole game, in a 2–1 defeat to Yeovil Town in the opening game of the season. Since making his debut, he established himself in the starting eleven and played in every match from the beginning until he suffered a groin injury, resulting him being on the substitute bench to heal his injury and eventually his illness. However, during 3–0 win over Bristol Rovers, in which he set up one of the goals, Dawson received a horror tackle from Carl Regan, resulted him being substituted, which he described it as "a leg-breaker." Dawson scored his first goal for the O's on his return in their 2–1 win against Tranmere Rovers on 11 December 2010. For his performance, Dawson was named League One's Team of the Week. It wasn't until on 8 February 2011 when he scored his second goal, in a 3–0 win over Swindon Town. Weeks later on 20 February 2011, Dawson played a vital role throughout a 1–1 draw against Arsenal in the 5th round of the FA Cup, naming him Man of the Match; but lost 5–0 in the FA replay. Despite suffering from another injury, Dawson finished his first season at Leyton Orient, making the total of 50 appearances and scoring 2 times in all competitions. He was named as the club's player of the season for the 2010–11 season.

In the 2011–12 season, Dawson missed the opening game of the season, due to suffering from ankle injury, which he sustained in the club's pre-season tour. After returning, he made his first appearance of the season on 13 August 2011, in a 1–0 loss against Tranmere Rovers. However, after suffering another injury, Dawson continued to feature in the first team and wasn't until on 17 December 2011 when he scored, in a 2–1 win over Notts County. After the match, Dawson, along with teammate Scott Cuthbert, was named League One's Team of the Week for his display. In a 2–1 loss against Carlisle United on 7 January 2012, Dawson was substituted in the first half after a challenge from Jon-Paul McGovern, in what turned out to be his last appearance for Leyton Orient. After the match, it was announced that Dawson was sidelined for six weeks. By the time Dawson departed Leyton Orient, he made 24 appearances and scoring 2 times in all competitions.

=== Barnsley ===
His performance at Leyton Orient attracted interest from clubs keen on signing Dawson. On 31 January 2012, the club accepted a bid from Championship side Barnsley and later joined the club for an undisclosed fee.

Despite suffering with injuries during his time at Oakwell, Dawson made his Barnsley debut on 25 February 2012, where he made his first start for the side, in a 1–0 loss against Coventry City. Since returning from injury, Dawson established himself as a regular part of the first team and finished the rest of the season, making 12 appearances.

In the 2012–13 season, Dawson continued to establish himself as a first team regular in the midfield position and then scored his first Barnsley goal on 29 September 2012, in a 1–1 draw against Ipswich Town. Throughout December 2012, Dawson scored three times in six appearances during the month against Leicester City, Millwall and Blackburn Rovers. However, he suffered an ankle ligament damage after just playing 12 minutes and was substituted as a result, in a 1–1 draw against Ipswich Town on 19 January 2013. After the match, it was announced that Dawson was out for six weeks. After returning to the first team in March, Dawson remained on the substitute bench for three matches until making his return to the first team, in a 2–0 win over Leicester City on 1 April 2013. His return was soon short–lived when he was sent–off for a foul on Yann Kermorgant, in a 6–0 defeat to Charlton Athletic on 13 April 2013. After serving a three match suspension, Dawson returned to the side in the last game of the season, in a 2–2 draw against Huddersfield Town, a draw that saw Barnsley's safety in the Championship. In his first full season at Barnsley, Dawson made the total of 34 appearances and scoring 4 times in all competitions.

In the 2013–14 season, Dawson continued to established himself in the midfield position and then scored his first goal of the season, in a 5–1 loss to Southampton in the second round of the League Cup. Two weeks later, on 14 September 2014, Dawson captained Barnsley for the first time in absence of Luke Steele, in a 3–2 loss against Nottingham Forest. However, Dawson found himself on the substitute bench since around late–September, due to injury inflicted and competitions. But he managed to regain his first team place following a new management of Danny Wilson. He was involved in an angry confrontation with Barnsley supporters after the team's 5–0 defeat at Huddersfield Town on 1 March 2014, for which he apologised and made a small financial donation to Barnsley Hospice. After the match, it was announced that Dawson would not face a charge by the club.

Dawson scored his first league goal of the season, in a 3–1 win over Reading on 25 March 2014. Just a month later, Dawson was named as one of seven footballers arrested in connection with alleged spot-fixing of football matches. When asked, Dawson said: "They came at 6.30 a.m. Ten officers. They searched our house from top to bottom and seized some of our belongings – my mobile phones, my laptop, my girlfriend's phone, documents. Then they said I had to go down to the station. We didn't know what was going on. It nearly broke me." Dawson's statement came three days after the National Crime Agency ended his nine-month ordeal by confirming that the case against him has been dropped. Despite the controversy, Dawson continued to remain in the first team for the rest of the season, which saw Barnsley relegated from the Championship.

At the end of the 2013–14 season, Dawson was offered a new contract by the club following their relegation. However, he turned down a new contract from the club, making him a free agent.

=== Rochdale ===
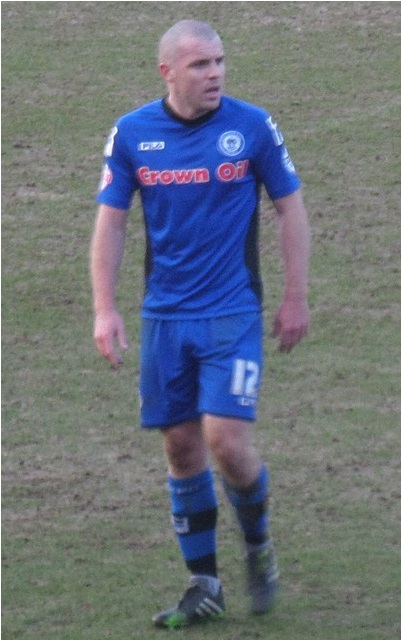
Dawson playing for Rochdale in March 2015

On 13 August 2014, Dawson signed for Rochdale on a one-year contract. Upon joining the club, Manager Keith Hill said of the move: "Stephen Dawson has got a lot of aggression and he's pedigree. He's played a lot of Championship and League One football and it was great to get the deal done."

Dawson made his Rochdale debut on 16 August 2014, in a 2–1 defeat against Chesterfield. He made his home debut on 23 August, in a 1–1 draw against Bristol City. Since making his debut for Rochdale, Dawson quickly established himself in the first team in the midfield position. In a 4–0 win over Crawley Town on 6 September 2014, he set up two goals for Matt Done and Calvin Andrew. He played his last game for the club in a 0–3 defeat against Oldham Athletic on 24 March 2015. Despite suffering setback that saw out of the first team, He played 30 times for Rochdale in the league that season, as they finished a very credible 8th place, their highest-ever league placing.

At the end of the 2014–15 season, Dawson was offered a new contract by the club. However, he turned down a contract from Rochdale in favour of joining Scunthorpe United.

=== Scunthorpe United ===
It was announced on 20 May 2015 that he will join Scunthorpe United on 1 July on a two-year deal with an option of a further year on a free transfer. Upon joining the club, Dawson was given a number 15 shirt ahead of the new season.

At the start of the 2015–16 season, Dawson was appointed as the club's captain. He made his Scunthorpe United debut, as well as, captain, starting the whole game, in a 2–1 loss against Burton Albion in the opening game of the season. After being sidelined from the first team over a knock, Dawson suffered a knee injury that resulted him being sidelined for three months. After returning to the substitute bench from injury for a match against Sheffield United on 19 December 2015, he returned to the first team from injury, where he played 62 minutes before being substituted, in a 1–0 win over Doncaster Rovers on 26 December 2015. Despite being out of the first team on two occasions in the first team, Dawson regained his first team place and played a vital role for the side as captain throughout the season. In his first season at Scunthorpe United, Dawson went on make the total of 25 appearances in all competitions. Nevertheless, at the end of the season, he was awarded the Dave Hardy Special Award.

In the 2016–17 season, Dawson was given a number 8 shirt for the new season. At the start of the season, he continued to be in the first team, having to kept himself fit in the club's pre–season tour and was featured in every match until he suffered an injury in late–November. After returning to the first team from injury, He then scored his first goal for Scunthorpe in a 3–2 win over future club Bury on 7 January 2017. His second goal came in a play-off semi final defeat to Millwall on 7 May 2017. Despite the club's failure to reach the play–offs final, Dawson won both the Players' Player of the Year and the Disabled Away Travel accolade. At the end of the 2016–17 season, he made the total of 49 appearances and scoring 2 times in all competitions. During his time at Scunthorpe United, Dawson was the club's fan favourite.

=== Bury ===
Despite Scunthorpe United offered a new contract to him, Dawson announced on 16 May 2017 that he was returning to Bury on a free transfer, signing a three–year contract. Bury gave him back his old number 8 shirt.

At the start of the 2017–18 season, Dawson was given the captaincy and led the team in the opening game of the season, a 1–0 win over Walsall. In a 1–0 loss against Sunderland in the first round of the League Cup, he tore a knee cartilage and was afterwards declared unfit to play for five months. Dawson continued to suffer with injury problems and only played in seven of Bury's matches during the 2018–19 season.

=== Hereford ===
He signed for National League North side Hereford in 2019.

=== Radcliffe ===
In February 2020 he joined Radcliffe.

== International career ==
Dawson represented the Republic of Ireland at Under-21 level twice. He also represented the country at under-17, 18 and 19 levels.

== Personal life ==
His younger brother Kevin plays for National League North side Gloucester City A.F.C. In May 2013, Stephen became a father when his girlfriend gave to birth to a baby daughter, Alexis.

During his time at Leyton Orient, Dawson began to write his own column in The Local Guardian Series. Growing up in Dublin, Ireland, Dawson said he supports Manchester United.

== Career statistics ==
Appearances and goals by club, season and competition
Club	Season	League			FA Cup		League Cup		Other		Total	
Club	Season	Division	Apps	Goals	Apps	Goals	Apps	Goals	Apps	Goals	Apps	Goals
Mansfield Town	2005–06	League Two	40	1	3	0	1	0	1 (Note: Appearances in Football League Trophy)	0	45	1
Mansfield Town	2006–07	League Two	34	1	1	0	2	0	0	0	37	1
Mansfield Town	2007–08	League Two	43	2	4	0	1	0	1	0	49	2
Mansfield Town	Total		117	4	8	0	4	0	2	0	131	4
Bury	2008–09	League Two	43	2	1	0	1	0	2 (Note: Appearances in League Two play-offs)	0	47	2
Bury	2009–10	League Two	45	4	1	0	1	0	3	0	50	4
Bury	Total		88	6	2	0	2	0	5	0	97	6
Leyton Orient	2010–11	League One	40	2	7	0	2	0	2	0	51	2
Leyton Orient	2011–12	League One	20	1	2	0	1	1	1	0	24	2
Leyton Orient	Total		60	3	9	0	3	1	3	0	75	4
Barnsley	2011–12	Championship	12	0	0	0	0	0	—		12	0
Barnsley	2012–13	Championship	32	4	1	0	1	0	—		34	4
Barnsley	2013–14	Championship	37	1	1	0	2	1	—		40	2
Barnsley	Total		81	5	2	0	3	1	—		86	6
Rochdale	2014–15	League One	30	0	5	0	0	0	1	0	36	0
Scunthorpe United	2015–16	League One	23	0	1	0	1	0	0	0	25	0
Scunthorpe United	2016–17	League One	43	1	1	0	2	0	3 (Note: One appearance in EFL Trophy; two appearances one goal in League One play-offs)	1	49	2
Scunthorpe United	Total		66	1	2	0	3	0	3	1	74	2
Bury	2017–18	League One	13	0	0	0	1	0	0	0	14	0
Bury	2018–19	League Two	5	0	0	0	1	0	1	0	7	0
Bury	Total		18	0	0	0	2	0	1	0	21	0
Hereford	2019–20	National League North	12	0	0	0	—		0	0	12	0
Radcliffe	2019–20	Northern Premier League Premier Division	3	0	0	0	—		0	0	3	0
Career total			475	19	28	0	17	2	15	1	535	22

== Honours ==
Individual

- PFA Team of the Year: 2009–10 Football League Two
- Bury Player of the Season: 2008–09, 2009–10
- Leyton Orient Player of the Season: 2010–11
