= Adam Birchall =

English footballer

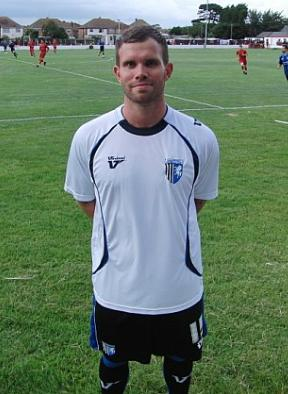
- Birchall with Gillingham in 2011

Personal information
- Full name: Adam Stephen Birchall
- Date of birth: 2 December 1984 (age 41)
- Place of birth: Maidstone, England
- Height: 5 ft 7 in (1.70 m)
- Positions: Striker; attacking midfielder

Team information
- Current team: Arsenal (U18 Head Coach)

Youth career
- 1994–2003: Arsenal

Senior career*
Years	Team	Apps	(Gls)
2003–2005	Arsenal	0	(0)
2004	→ Wycombe Wanderers (loan)	12	(4)
2005–2007	Mansfield Town	36	(2)
2006–2007	→ Barnet (loan)	7	(2)
2007–2009	Barnet	97	(17)
2009–2011	Dover Athletic	76	(49)
2011–2014	Gillingham	17	(0)
2012	→ Dartford (loan)	6	(1)
2013	→ Dartford (loan)	23	(2)
2014–2016	Bromley	25	(1)
2015–2016	→ Maidstone United (loan)	16	(1)
Total		315	(79)

International career
2002–2006	Wales U21	12	(3)

Managerial career
- 2022–2024: Arsenal U17
- 2024–: Arsenal U18
- * Club domestic league appearances and goals

Adam Stephen Birchall (born 2 December 1984) is a retired footballer who played as a forward and is the current head coach of the Arsenal Under-18s.

Despite being born in England he has several caps for the Welsh under-21 team, scoring on his debut against the Finland under 21s.

== Career ==
Born in Maidstone, Kent, Birchall began his career at Arsenal, but never made it to the first-team. In the 2004–05 season, Birchall had a successful loan spell at Wycombe Wanderers, scoring four goals in twelve league games. He was released by Arsenal at the end of that season, and joined Mansfield Town in June 2005 on a two-year contract.

The move to Mansfield was something of a disappointment for Birchall. Big things were expected from the youngster, but despite occasional flashes of brilliance, he failed to live up to expectations, scoring only three goals and spending most of his time at Mansfield playing on the right of midfield. He did, however, score in Mansfield's nationally televised FA Cup victory against Grays Athletic on his 21st birthday.

On 23 November 2006, Birchall was loaned to divisional rivals Barnet, where he was a hit, scoring the first goal in their 4–1 thrashing of Northampton Town in the FA Cup. A move was made permanent on 4 January 2007. During his time at Barnet, Birchall is credited with the idea for a now widely used scheme whereby only the team captain can question referees' decisions, to reduce dissent and the yellow cards that follow. Since the beginning of the 2007–08 season, when the rule was introduced, the club's disciplinary record has significantly improved, and the club has earned praise throughout the game. After finishing as the top goalscorer for Barnet in the 2007–08 season with 15 goals, Birchall struggled for form in 2009 and was released in May after scoring only two league goals in the 2008–09 season.

Birchall signed for Conference South side Dover Athletic in July 2009. Birchall made his league debut for Dover in the first game of the season against Maidenhead United, before scoring his first league goal for the club in the following fixture against Bishop's Stortford. Birchall scored both goals against Aldershot Town to take Dover to the FA Cup 3rd Round for the first time in their history. Birchall became the club's goalscoring record holder, and the Conference South record holder, at the end of the 2010–11 season with a total of 45 goals in 49 appearances. He also was the top goal scorer in the FA Cup that year and went on to receive the award at Wembley. Birchall again attracted interest from clubs higher up the football pyramid and in July 2011 Dover Athletic received substantial undisclosed bids from League Two sides Swindon Town, newcomers AFC Wimbledon, and local rivals Gillingham, for whom he signed a three-year deal on 12 July 2011. He was seriously injured during a pre-season friendly, however, and missed the entire 2011–12 season.

Birchall finally made his competitive debut for Gillingham on 14 August 2012, coming on as a substitute in a 2–1 away win against Bristol City in the League Cup. He scored his first goal for the Gills in their 4–0 FA Cup win over Scunthorpe United on 3 November, but after playing only 21 games in 2 seasons he was released by the club at the end of the 2013–14 season.

Soon after, Birchall signed for Bromley. He scored his first competitive goal for the club in a 5–1 win over Uxbridge in the FA Cup. His first league goal for the club was a 90th-minute winner against Bishop's Stortford on 9 December.

== Coaching career ==
In July 2016 Birchall returned to his former club Arsenal as a youth coach. He became under-17s head coach in 2022 having previously been with the age-group below, as well as becoming assistant head coach for the under-18s to newly appointed Jack Wilshere. Two years later, he was appointed under-18s head coach after the departure of Wilshere.

== Personal life ==
In July 2011 Birchall became engaged to Lianne, and the couple's first child was due to be born in October that same year.

== Career statistics ==
As of match played 25 April 2015.

Club statistics
Club	Season	League			FA Cup		League Cup		Other		Total	
Club	Season	Division	Apps	Goals	Apps	Goals	Apps	Goals	Apps	Goals	Apps	Goals
Wycombe Wanderers (loan)	2004–05	League Two	12	4	0	0	1	0	2 (Note: Appearance(s) in Football League Trophy)	1	15	5
Mansfield Town	2005–06	League Two	31	2	3	1	2	0	1	0	37	3
Mansfield Town	2006–07	League Two	5	0	0	0	0	0	0	0	5	0
Mansfield Town	Total		36	2	3	1	2	0	1	0	42	3
Barnet	2006–07	League Two	23	6	3	1	—		—		26	7
Barnet	2007–08	League Two	42	11	6	2	1	1	1	1	50	15
Barnet	2008–09	League Two	39	2	2	0	1	0	1	2	43	4
Barnet	Total		104	19	11	3	2	1	2	3	119	26
Dover Athletic	2009–10	Conference South	34	15	3	1	—		6 (Note: Four appearances and two goals in FA Trophy, two appearances in Conference South play-offs)	2	43	18
Dover Athletic	2010–11	Conference South	42	34	7	11	—		1 (Note: Appearance(s) in FA Trophy)	0	50	45
Dover Athletic	Total		76	49	10	12	—		7	2	93	63
Gillingham	2011–12	League Two	0	0	0	0	0	0	0	0	0	0
Gillingham	2012–13	League Two	15	0	2	1	1	0	1	0	19	1
Gillingham	2013–14	League One	2	0	0	0	0	0	0	0	2	0
Gillingham	Total		17	0	2	1	1	0	1	0	21	1
Dartford (loan)	2012–13	Conference Premier	6	1	—		—		—		6	1
Dartford (loan)	2013–14	Conference Premier	23	2	—		—		2	0	25	2
Dartford (loan)	Total		29	3	—		—		2	0	31	3
Bromley	2014–15	Conference South	25	1	0	0	—		2	0	27	1
Career total			299	78	26	17	6	1	17	6	348	102

== Honours ==
Gillingham

- Football League Two: 2012–13
