= Simon Brown (footballer, born 1983) =

English footballer

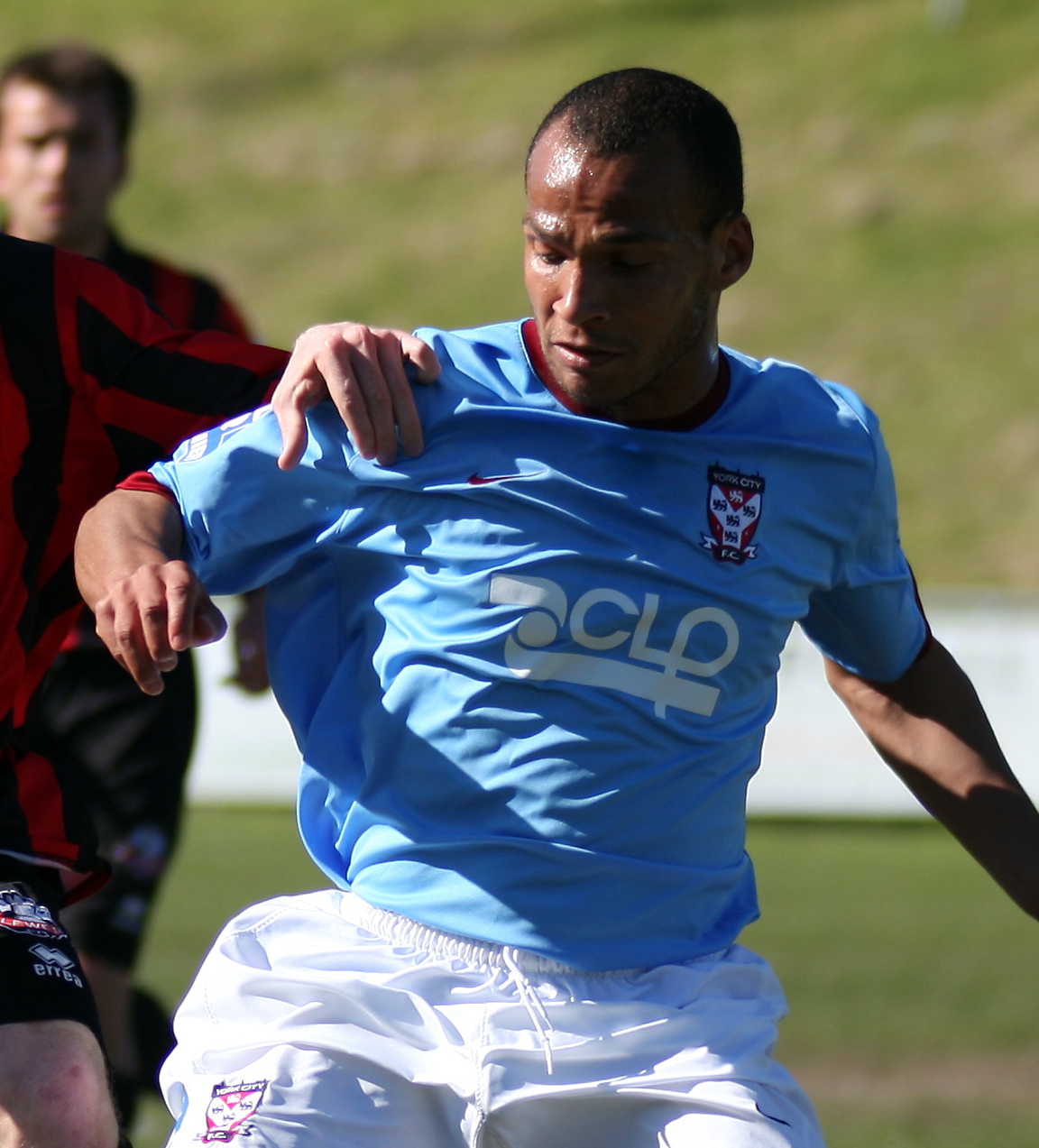
- Brown playing for York City in 2009

Personal information
- Full name: Simon Alexander Brown
- Date of birth: 18 September 1983 (age 43)
- Place of birth: Wednesbury, England
- Positions: Midfielder; striker

Team information
- Current team: Chasetown

Youth career
- ?–2003: West Bromwich Albion

Senior career*
| Years | Team | Apps | (Gls) |
| 2003–2004 | West Bromwich Albion | 0 | (0) |
| 2004 | → Kidderminster Harriers (loan) | 8 | (2) |
| 2004 | → Kidderminster Harriers (loan) | 13 | (0) |
| 2004–2008 | Mansfield Town | 113 | (21) |
| 2008–2010 | Wrexham | 13 | (2) |
| 2008–2009 | → Rushden & Diamonds (loan) | 3 | (0) |
| 2009 | → York City (loan) | 17 | (0) |
| 2009–2010 | → Tamworth (loan) | 8 | (1) |
| 2010–2012 | Eastwood Town | ? | (?) |
| 2012– | Chasetown | ? | (?) |
- * Club domestic league appearances and goals

Simon Alexander Brown (born 18 September 1983) is an English footballer who plays for Chasetown as a midfielder.

He started his career with West Bromwich Albion and was loaned out to Kidderminster Harriers twice in League Two, before joining Mansfield Town. Here, he scored a hat-trick in 14 minutes, which was the fastest in the history of the club. He was released by Mansfield following their relegation to the Conference Premier and he signed for Wrexham in 2008.

== Career ==
Born in Wednesbury, West Midlands, Brown grew up as an Aston Villa supporter. He was educated at Wood Green High School and while playing football for their school side, he was spotted by West Bromwich Albion and was signed on by the club at the age of 11. He signed professional terms with the club in July 2003. He joined League Two side Kidderminster Harriers on loan in March 2004, where he impressed on his debut in a 1–1 draw against Lincoln City. He returned to West Brom in May 2004, having scored twice in eight appearances at Kidderminster. He went to Kidderminster on loan for a second time in July 2004 and made 14 appearances before breaking a bone in his leg in October 2004. He made one more appearance for Kidderminster in the following month and then joined Mansfield Town in December 2004 on an 18-month contract for an initial fee of £50,000 and made 21 appearances in the remainder of the 2004–05 season for Mansfield, scoring two goals.

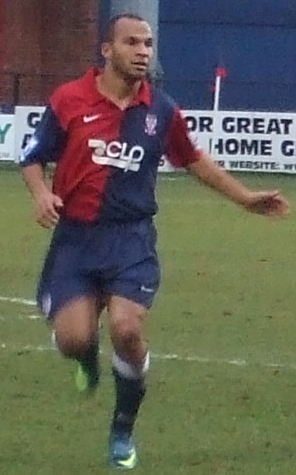
Brown playing for York City in 2009

Brown had a fine 2005–06 season and was Mansfield's second leading scorer behind Richie Barker with 12 goals before his season was ended by a hernia operation in April 2006. He was offered a new contract in July 2006 and made 40 appearances in the 2006–07 season, scoring five goals. He was offered a further contract in May 2007 and in November scored a hat-trick in 14 minutes, the fastest in the club's history, as Mansfield beat Macclesfield Town 5–0, which earned him a place in the League Two team of the week. After Mansfield Town were relegated to the Conference Premier at the end of the 2007–08 season, he was released by the club. Brown had made over 120 appearances in all competitions for Mansfield. He joined newly relegated Conference Premier side Wrexham in June 2008 on a two-year contract. In November 2008 he joined Rushden & Diamonds on loan until January 2009. He made his debut in a 4–0 victory over Altrincham and returned to Wrexham following the expiry of the loan on 5 January, making three appearances for Rushden.

He was involved in a controversy when he wrote a message on the Facebook profile of Wrexham teammate Christian Smith, which regarded Wes Baynes's contract situation at the club, and caused an angry reaction by the fans. Following the completion of his loan spell at Rushden, he was set to join York City on loan. The move was completed on 15 January, when he signed for the rest of the 2008–09 season. He made his debut in a 3–0 victory against Lewes on 17 January as a right midfielder. He featured as a striker as part of a 4-3-3 formation in a 1–1 draw with Altrincham on 27 January. He joined Tamworth on a month's loan on 13 November, making nine appearances before returning to Wrexham in January 2010. On 11 March 2010, he was released from his contract at Wrexham by mutual consent after failing to make a first team appearance for the club all season. He later joined Eastwood Town and made his debut in a 2–1 defeat to Workington.

== Career statistics ==
Updated 1 April 2009.

Club Performance
| Club | Season | League^{[A]} | | FA Cup | | League Cup | | Other^{[B]} | | Total |
| Club | Season | App | Goals | App | Goals | App | Goals | App | Goals | App | Goals |
|---|---|---|---|---|---|---|---|---|---|---|---|
| West Bromwich Albion | 2003–04 | 0 | 0 | 0 | 0 | 0 | 0 | 0 | 0 | 0 | 0 |
| West Bromwich Albion | 2004–05 | 0 | 0 | 0 | 0 | 0 | 0 | 0 | 0 | 0 | 0 |
| West Bromwich Albion | Subtotal | 0 | 0 | 0 | 0 | 0 | 0 | 0 | 0 | 0 | 0 |
| Kidderminster Harriers (loan) | 2003–04 | 8 | 2 | 0 | 0 | 0 | 0 | 0 | 0 | 8 | 2 |
| Kidderminster Harriers (loan) | 2004–05 | 13 | 0 | 0 | 0 | 1 | 1 | 0 | 0 | 14 | 1 |
| Mansfield Town | 2004–05 | 21 | 2 | 0 | 0 | 0 | 0 | 0 | 0 | 21 | 2 |
| Mansfield Town | 2005–06 | 29 | 10 | 1 | 1 | 3 | 1 | 0 | 0 | 33 | 12 |
| Mansfield Town | 2006–07 | 34 | 5 | 3 | 0 | 1 | 0 | 2 | 0 | 40 | 5 |
| Mansfield Town | 2007–08 | 29 | 4 | 3 | 0 | 0 | 0 | 0 | 0 | 32 | 4 |
| Mansfield Town | Subtotal | 113 | 21 | 7 | 1 | 4 | 1 | 2 | 0 | 126 | 23 |
| Wrexham | 2008–09 | 13 | 2 | 0 | 0 | 0 | 0 | 0 | 0 | 13 | 2 |
| Rushden & Diamonds (loan) | 2008–09 | 3 | 0 | 0 | 0 | 0 | 0 | 0 | 0 | 3 | 0 |
| York City (loan) | 2008–09 | 17 | 0 | 0 | 0 | 0 | 0 | 0 | 0 | 17 | 0 |
| Total | | 169 | 26 | 7 | 1 | 5 | 2 | 2 | 0 | 183 | 29 |

A. The "League" column constitutes appearances and goals (including those as a substitute) in the Football League and Football Conference.
B. The "Other" column constitutes appearances and goals (including those as a substitute) in the Football League Trophy.
