= Austin McIntosh =

English footballer (born 1987)

Personal information
- Full name: Austin James McIntosh
- Date of birth: 5 November 1987 (age 38)
- Place of birth: Sheffield, England
- Height: 6 ft 1 in (1.85 m)
- Position: Defender

Team information
- Current team: Stocksbridge Park Steels

Youth career
- Mansfield Town

Senior career*
Years	Team	Apps	(Gls)
2004–2007	Mansfield Town^{[A]}	1	(0)
2007	Ilkeston Town		
2008–2011	Montevallo Falcons		
2011–2012	Eastwood Town		
2012	Sheffield	2	(0)
2012	Reynir Sandgerði	8	(0)
2012	Njarðvík	4	(0)
2012–	Stocksbridge Park Steels	0	(0)
- * Club domestic league appearances and goals as of 21:42, 17 December 2012 (UTC)

Austin James McIntosh (born 5 November 1987) is an English footballer who plays as a defender for Stocksbridge Park Steels. He made one appearance in the Football League for Mansfield Town, and has also had spells in American and Icelandic football.

== Early life ==
Austin McIntosh was born in Sheffield, South Yorkshire on 5 November 1987, the son of Clifford and Angela McIntosh, and has a twin sister named Chloe. He attended the All Saints Catholic High School and while there he represented the school football team as they won the Sheffield Schools championship in 2004.

== Career ==
McIntosh, a right back who has also played in central defence, began his career at Mansfield Town, and made his Football League debut for the Stags in the closing stages of the 2004–05 season, on 7 May 2005 in the starting eleven away to Leyton Orient in a League Two game which Mansfield lost 2–1. However, that turned out to be his last first-team appearance for the club.^{[A]} He missed most of 2005–06 with an eye injury and was released during the 2006–07 season. McIntosh joined Ilkeston Town of the Northern Premier League in April 2007, but played only once for the club.

McIntosh then headed to the United States of America, first studying at Bellevue before moving to University of Montevallo where he played for the college's soccer team, Montevallo Falcons, while studying for a degree in accounting.

On his return to England, McIntosh joined Eastwood Town. Towards the end of the 2011–12 season, he joined Northern Premier League First Division South club Sheffield, where he made two league appearances. He then had a trial with Notts County before joining Icelandic side Reynir Sandgerði on 15 May 2012. McIntosh made his Reynir debut in the 2–0 away win over Njarðvík the following weekend and went on to make a total of nine appearances for the club, eight of them in the league. On 31 July 2012 he moved to Njarðvík on a free transfer, and played four league matches during the remainder of the season.

Following the end of the Icelandic season, McIntosh returned to England and on 17 December 2012 he signed for Northern Premier League side Stocksbridge Park Steels.

== Notes ==
A. ^{a} ^{b} Soccerbase and ESPNSoccernet attribute an appearance on 28 April 2007 against Barnet, but the Playfair annual has no appearances for McIntosh in the 2006–07 season, his Mansfield Town profile, archived in July 2007, mentions no appearance that season, and Neil Brown gives him just the one league appearance.
