= Kyle Jacobs (footballer, born 1986) =

English footballer

Personal information
- Full name: Kyle Keith Jacobs
- Date of birth: 18 October 1986 (age 40)
- Place of birth: Manchester, England
- Position: Midfielder

Senior career*
Years	Team	Apps	(Gls)
2004–2005	Oldham Athletic	0	(0)
2005–2006	Mansfield Town	5	(0)
2006	Macclesfield Town	0	(0)
2006	Bangor City		
2007	Welshpool Town		
Total		5	(0)
- * Club domestic league appearances and goals

Kyle Keith Jacobs (born 18 October 1986) is an English former professional footballer who played in the Football League for Mansfield Town.
