= Danny Reet =

English footballer

Personal information
- Full name: Daniel Steven Reet
- Date of birth: 31 January 1987 (age 39)
- Place of birth: Sheffield, England
- Position: Striker

Team information
- Current team: Redmires

Youth career
- 2003–2004: Sheffield United
- 2004–2005: Sheffield Wednesday

Senior career*
Years	Team	Apps	(Gls)
2005–2006	Sheffield Wednesday	0	(0)
2005	→ Bury (loan)	6	(4)
2006–2008	Mansfield Town	40	(11)
2007	→ Rochdale (loan)	6	(0)
2007	→ Alfreton Town (loan)	17	(7)
2008	Dinnington Town		
2008–2009	Buxton	32	(3)
- * Club domestic league appearances and goals

Danny Reet (born 31 January 1987) is an English retired footballer.

== Career ==
Reet was a striker, and a graduate of Sheffield Wednesday's youth academy after a yearlong spell at Sheffield Wednesday's local rivals Sheffield United. In November 2005, he was loaned to Bury, where he scored four times in six games – including two goals against Mansfield, whom he later joined. Reet scored five goals in 18 appearances for the Stags in 2005–06. Reet went on loan to Rochdale on 24 March 2007 and made a handful of substitute appearances before returning to Mansfield Town. Reet went on loan to Alfreton Town on 14 September 2007. His Mansfield Town contract was cancelled on the free transfer deadline, 27 March 2008, enabling him to find a new club. He signed for Dinnington Town for the 2008–09 season. Danny later signed for Buxton F.C..
