= Jason White (footballer, born 1984) =

English footballer

Personal information
- Full name: Jason Lee White
- Date of birth: 28 January 1984 (age 42)
- Place of birth: Sutton-in-Ashfield, England
- Height: 6 ft 2 in (1.88 m)
- Position: Goalkeeper

Team information
- Current team: Scarborough Athletic

Youth career
- –2000: Nottingham Forest

Senior career*
Years	Team	Apps	(Gls)
2002–2009	Mansfield Town	57	(0)
2009	King's Lynn	?	(?)
2009–2012	Shirebrook Town	?	(?)
2012–2013	Gainsborough Trinity	?	(?)
2013–	Scarborough Athletic	1	(0)
- * Club domestic league appearances and goals as of 04:35, 19 August 2013 (UTC)

Jason Lee White (born 28 January 1984) is an English professional footballer who plays as a goalkeeper for Northern Premier League Division One South side Scarborough Athletic. He has previously played in the Football League for Mansfield Town.

== Career ==
=== Mansfield Town ===
White joined Third Division side Mansfield Town after being released by First Division side Nottingham Forest at the age of 16 and made his debut in September 2002 against Cheltenham Town when he came on as a substitute to replace the injured Kevin Pilkington. He made only 13 appearances during the 2005–06 season, as he was usually understudy to Pilkington and later Kevin Pressman. A highlight of this season was helping Mansfield defeat Championship side Stoke City on penalties in the League Cup; White saved one of Stoke's penalty attempts from Carl Hoefkens. But he was still offered a new contract in April 2006 and began the 2006–07 season in goal. He went on to make 33 appearances that season. By the end of the 2007–08 season, White had made over 50 appearances for Mansfield, despite this he was transfer listed in January 2009 and left the club at the end of the season when his contract expired.

=== Non-league ===
Following his release from Mansfield, White moved to Northern Premier League Premier Division side King's Lynn but was released when the club were wound up. He then moved to Northern Counties East Football League Division One side Shirebrook Town where he remained until March 2012 when he moved to Conference North side Gainsborough Trinity. White played out the remainder of the 2011–12 campaign as Trinity's first choice keeper replacing the injured Phil Barnes. The following season, he was limited to making only a small number of appearances as Trinity chose to bring in Jan Budtz as first choice keeper. Following the re-signing of Barnes in May 2013 from Alfreton Town, both Budtz and White were released.

On 31 May 2013, White signed for newly promoted Northern Premier League Division One South side Scarborough Athletic. He made his debut for Scarborough Athletic when he started the first game of the season, a 1–1 draw at Kidsgrove Athletic on 17 August 2013.
