= Richie Barker (footballer, born 1975) =

English footballer & manager (born 1975)

Personal information
- Full name: Richard Ian Barker
- Date of birth: 30 May 1975 (age 51)
- Place of birth: Sheffield, England
- Position: Striker

Team information
- Current team: Milton Keynes Dons (assistant)

Senior career*
Years	Team	Apps	(Gls)
1993–1997	Sheffield Wednesday	0	(0)
1995	→ Doncaster Rovers (loan)	6	(0)
1996	→ Ards (loan)	7	(3)
1997–1998	Linfield	?	(?)
1997	→ Brighton & Hove Albion (loan)	53	(11)
1998–1999	Brighton & Hove Albion	43	(10)
1999–2001	Macclesfield Town	58	(23)
2001–2004	Rotherham United	140	(12)
2004–2007	Mansfield Town	95	(40)
2007–2009	Hartlepool United	62	(23)
2008	→ Rotherham United (loan)	12	(1)
2009	Rotherham United	1	(0)
Total		477	(123)

Managerial career
- 2011–2012: Bury
- 2012–2013: Crawley Town
- 2013–2014: Portsmouth
- * Club domestic league appearances and goals

Richard "Richie" Ian Barker (born 30 May 1975) is an English former professional footballer who is currently the assistant manager of Milton Keynes Dons.

He has previously managed Portsmouth, Bury and Crawley Town.

== Playing career ==
Born in Sheffield, Barker began his career at Sheffield Wednesday, but only played in the Intertoto Cup for the first team. He was sold by the Owls in 1997 to Northern Irish side Linfield after loan spells at Doncaster and Ards, before returning home to play for Brighton & Hove Albion. He played two seasons at Brighton, scoring 12 goals, before moving to Macclesfield on a free transfer in 1999.

At Macclesfield, Barker scored 23 goals in 58 league games. He was signed by Rotherham United in January 2001, and helped the Millers gain promotion to the Championship. He was mostly used as a substitute by Rotherham, and was allowed to move to Mansfield Town on a free transfer in November 2004.

Barker soon became a fan favourite at Field Mill, scoring 10 goals in his first season at the club. In the summer of 2005, he was named team captain, and he led by example with his professionalism and work-rate. Barker was the Stags' top scorer in 2005–06 with a career-best 23 goals, including two goals against his old club Rotherham in the FA Cup first round.

In the summer of 2006, Barker signed a contract extension with Mansfield which tied him with the club until the end of the 2008–09 season. However, in January 2007 he was reluctantly forced to transfer to Hartlepool United during the January transfer window, much to the anger of the Stags fans.

He re-joined Rotherham United on 3 October 2008, on an emergency loan in January 2009. He scored on his second Millers debut in the 4–1 over Grimsby Town after coming off the bench. He made his move permanent on 1 January 2009. Due to a knee injury in January 2009, he decided to hang up his boots on 29 May 2009.

== Managerial career ==
=== Bury ===
After joining Sheffield United, being part of the academy, Barker was named the manager of Bury's youth team from July 2010. Barker became caretaker manager of Bury in April 2011 after Alan Knill left for Scunthorpe United with eight games left in the season. Barker led Bury to six consecutive victories and promotion to League One. He was named Football League Two Manager of the Month for April 2011. This successful spell led to him being appointed as Bury's permanent manager on 1 June 2011.

=== Crawley Town ===
Barker was appointed manager of Crawley Town on 7 August 2012.

On 27 November 2013, Crawley Town terminated Barker's contract with immediate effect. At the time of his dismissal Crawley had not won any of their last seven games, scoring just once in those games.

=== Portsmouth ===
On 9 December 2013, Portsmouth announced Barker as their new manager with Steve Coppell being appointed as director of football. Barker was sacked on 27 March 2014 after 20 games in charge. At the time of his dismissal Portsmouth had not won any of their last six games, scoring just once in those games.

=== Milton Keynes Dons ===
On 1 April 2014 Barker was appointed Assistant Manager at Milton Keynes Dons. This has initially been confirmed as being until the end of the 13/14 season. This has since been extended to a position as head of coaching for the forthcoming 2014/15 season.

On 23 October 2016, following the mutual-termination of the contract of manager Karl Robinson, Barker was announced as caretaker manager of the club whilst a replacement was sought.

On 20 December 2016, following the appointment of new manager Robbie Neilson early in the month, Milton Keynes Dons announced that Barker had left the club by mutual consent.

=== Charlton Athletic ===
On 21 December 2016, Barker joined League One side Charlton Athletic as a first-team coach, re-joining manager Karl Robinson having previously worked alongside him at Milton Keynes Dons. On 28 April 2017 the club announced he would be leaving at the end of the season.

=== Rotherham United ===
On 4 May 2017, Barker was appointed assistant manager of Rotherham United, following their relegation from the EFL Championship. Barker left this role in September 2022.

=== Derby County ===
On 22 September 2022, Barker was appointed assistant manager of League One Derby County, after Paul Warne's appointment as Derby's head coach who also made the same move. The club finished 7th for the season, missing out on the playoffs and equaling the club record for the lowest finish on the league pyramid. He was then part of the coaching staff that achieved promotion to the Championship the following season, achieving a club record 92 points as they finished runners-up to Portsmouth.

Barker was relieved from his position, alongside head coach Paul Warne, on 7 February 2025 with the club in the Championship relegation zone and on a run of seven consecutive league defeats.

== Personal life ==
He is the father of current Crawley Town and former Charlton Athletic player Charlie Barker.

== Managerial statistics ==
As of 3 December 2016

Managerial record by team and tenure
Team	From	To	Record				
Team	From	To	P	W	D	L	Win %
Bury	31 March 2011	7 August 2012	58	22	13	23	37.9
Crawley Town	7 August 2012	27 November 2013	75	28	22	25	37.3
Portsmouth	9 December 2013	27 March 2014	20	4	8	8	20.0
Milton Keynes Dons (caretaker)	23 October 2016	3 December 2016	8	2	3	3	25.0
Total			161	56	46	59	34.8

== Honours ==
=== Player ===
Hartlepool United

- League Two runner-up: 2006–07

Individual

- PFA Team of the Year: 1999–2000 Third Division

=== Manager ===
Bury

- League Two runner-up: 2010–11

Individual

- League Two Manager of the Month: April 2011
