= 1994–95 Huddersfield Town A.F.C. season =

Huddersfield Town
1994–95 season
- Chairman: Terry Fisher; Geoffrey Headey
- Manager: Neil Warnock
- Stadium: Kirklees Stadium
- Second Division: 5th (promoted via play-offs)
- Play-offs: Winners
- FA Cup: Second round (eliminated by Lincoln City)
- League Cup: Second round (eliminated by Southampton)
- League Trophy: Area quarter-final (eliminated by Bury)
- Top goalscorer: League: Andy Booth (26); All: Andy Booth (30)
- Highest home attendance: 17,959 vs Birmingham City (6 May 1995)
- Lowest home attendance: 4,183 vs York City (17 October 1994)
- Biggest win: 5–1 vs Cardiff City (18 February 1995); 5–1 vs Chester City (11 March 1995)
- Biggest defeat: 0–4 vs Southampton (5 October 1994)

Huddersfield Town's 1994–95 campaign was Town's first season in their new stadium, the Alfred McAlpine Stadium, in Huddersfield, West Yorkshire, England. After playing at Leeds Road for 86 years, Town moved to the new stadium with a then capacity of around 20,000. Under the leadership of Neil Warnock, Town finished in 5th place, but after qualifying for the play-offs, Town beat 2nd placed Brentford, they beat 4th placed Bristol Rovers at Wembley Stadium.

== Squad at the start of the season ==
Note: Flags indicate national team as defined under FIFA eligibility rules; some limited exceptions apply. Players may hold more than one non-FIFA nationality.

No.	Pos.	Nation	Player
--	GK	ENG	Kevin Blackwell
--	GK	ENG	Steve Francis
--	DF	SCO	Tom Cowan
--	DF	ENG	Jon Dyson
--	DF	ENG	Kevin Gray
--	DF	ENG	Graham Mitchell
--	DF	IRL	Pat Scully
--	DF	ENG	Simon Trevitt
--	MF	ENG	Simon Baldry
--	MF	ENG	Chris Billy

No.	Pos.	Nation	Player
--	MF	ENG	Darren Bullock
--	MF	ENG	Gary Clayton
--	MF	ENG	Richard Logan
--	MF	ENG	Paul Reid
--	FW	ENG	Andy Booth
--	FW	ENG	Iain Dunn
--	FW	ENG	Ronnie Jepson
--	FW	ENG	Phil Starbuck
--	FW	ENG	Craig Whitington

== Review ==
Following a mediocre season the previous year, many were hoping the move to the Alfred McAlpine Stadium, many were hoping a charge up the Division 2 ladder.

In the summer of 1994, popular full-back Tom Cowan made his loan move from Sheffield United a permanent one, centre-back Kevin Gray arrived from Mansfield Town in a part exchange with Iffy Onuora, and midfielder Paul Reid made the switch from local rivals Bradford City. Phil Starbuck, despite speculation about a move to Notts County, signed a new deal that stipulated he was made new club captain. In addition to these signings, veteran striker Ronnie Jepson was revitalised and formed a potent strikeforce with the precocious Booth. A first-day 4–1 drubbing of Blackpool at Bloomfield Road, Reid and Jepson scoring twice, signalled that Town meant business.

A brilliant start to the season saw Town beat Blackpool 4–1 at Bloomfield Road, a 1–0 defeat to Wycombe Wanderers in their home league game followed, but they then went on a run of 13 league games without defeat, which was brought to an abrupt halt by a 3–0 defeat at York City. During Town's second round match in the Auto Windscreens Shield, Iain Dunn became the first person in England to score a golden goal in first-class professional football.

In August 1994, the Terriers opened their new home with a 0–1 defeat to Martin O'Neill's recently promoted Wycombe Wanderers. However, things were soon to get much better for Warnock's team, Jepson and Booth amassing 53 goals between them in League and cup. Town soon reached the top of the league, where they would battle with Birmingham City and Brentford for the one automatic spot that season. But with Starbuck unable to find his form, the festive period saw a downturn in their fortunes. Starbuck had played his last game for the club and would move on loan to Sheffield United, later making his move permanent. Despite a substantial outlay on the Bradford City Lees (Sinnott and Duxbury) with Graham Mitchell going in the other direction, the first warning signs came with some poor results over the festive season, including defeats at Wycombe and Hull City. The Terriers challenge started to fade around Easter with solitary points gained in Yorkshire derbies against Hull City and Rotherham United and a defeat in a match played in farcical conditions at Shrewsbury Town signalled the end of Town's automatic hopes. Warnock's men limped over the finish line in 5th place (one of their lowest positions in months) and signed off with a home defeat by newly crowned champions Birmingham.

A two-legged play-off against 2nd placed Brentford then followed. After a 1–1 draw at the McAlpine, many thought Town blew it again, but a 1–1 draw at Griffin Park led to a penalty shoot-out. After Pat Scully missed, Steve Francis saved the penalties of both Denny Mundee and Jamie Bates, it was left to Darren Bullock to score the winner to send Town to Wembley for a match against 4th placed Bristol Rovers.

At Wembley, Town took the lead in the play-off final with a goal from Andy Booth one minute from half-time, but within a minute of the goal, future Town player Marcus Stewart levelled proceedings, but with less than 10 minutes remaining Huddersfield-born Chris Billy scored the winning goal which gained Town's promotion. Within a few days of winning promotion, Neil Warnock left to become manager of Plymouth Argyle.

== Squad at the end of the season ==
Note: Flags indicate national team as defined under FIFA eligibility rules; some limited exceptions apply. Players may hold more than one non-FIFA nationality.

No.	Pos.	Nation	Player
--	GK	ENG	Kevin Blackwell
--	GK	ENG	Steve Francis
--	DF	SCO	Tom Cowan
--	DF	ENG	Jon Dyson
--	DF	ENG	Kevin Gray
--	DF	IRL	Pat Scully
--	DF	ENG	Lee Sinnott
--	DF	ENG	Simon Trevitt
--	MF	ENG	Simon Baldry
--	MF	ENG	Chris Billy
--	MF	ENG	Darren Bullock

No.	Pos.	Nation	Player
--	MF	ENG	Gary Clayton
--	MF	ENG	Simon Collins
--	MF	ENG	Gary Crosby
--	MF	ENG	Lee Duxbury
--	MF	ENG	Richard Logan
--	MF	ENG	Paul Reid
--	FW	ENG	Andy Booth
--	FW	ENG	Iain Dunn
--	FW	ENG	Ronnie Jepson
--	FW	ENG	Paul Moulden
--	FW	ENG	Craig Whitington

== Results ==
=== Second Division ===
Date	Opponents	Home/ Away	Result F – A	Scorers	Attendance	Position
13 August 1994	Blackpool	A	4–1	Reid (2), Jepson (2)	8,343	4th
20 August 1994	Wycombe Wanderers	H	0–1		13,334	12th
27 August 1994	Chester City	A	2–1	Booth, Dunn	2,895	8th
30 August 1994	Leyton Orient	H	2–1	Booth, Reid	8,552	6th
3 September 1994	Oxford United	H	3–3	Booth, Starbuck (pen), Bullock	10,122	5th
10 September 1994	Plymouth Argyle	A	3–0	Booth (3)	5,464	4th
13 September 1994	Peterborough United	A	2–2	Dunn (2)	5,316	4th
17 September 1994	Stockport County	H	2–1	Booth (2)	9,526	2nd
24 September 1994	Bradford City	A	4–3	Booth (2), Jepson, Reid	11,300	2nd
1 October 1994	Brighton & Hove Albion	H	3–0	Booth, Reid, Logan	10,321	1st
8 October 1994	Birmingham City	A	1–1	Bullock	15,265	1st
15 October 1994	Cambridge United	H	3–1	Jepson (2, 1 pen), Dunn	10,742	1st
22 October 1994	Crewe Alexandra	A	3–3	Jepson, Billy, Booth	5,352	1st
29 October 1994	Bournemouth	H	3–1	Booth, Jepson, Scully	11,251	1st
1 November 1994	Wrexham	H	2–1	Bullock, Billy	9,639	1st
5 November 1994	York City	A	0–3		6,345	1st
19 November 1994	Brentford	H	1–0	Jepson	10,889	1st
26 November 1994	Bristol Rovers	A	1–1	Jepson (pen)	5,679	2nd
10 December 1994	Wycombe Wanderers	A	1–2	Jepson	6,790	4th
17 December 1994	Blackpool	H	1–1	Booth	11,536	4th
26 December 1994	Hull City	A	0–1		10,220	4th
27 December 1994	Rotherham United	H	1–0	Booth	15,557	4th
31 December 1994	Swansea City	A	1–1	Booth	5,438	4th
2 January 1995	Shrewsbury Town	H	2–1	Jepson, Duxbury	12,748	2nd
7 January 1995	Crewe Alexandra	H	1–2	Booth	11,466	2nd
14 January 1995	Cardiff City	A	0–0		3,808	2nd
28 January 1995	Bournemouth	A	2–0	Jepson, Duxbury	4,427	2nd
4 February 1995	Bristol Rovers	H	1–1	Booth	10,389	3rd
11 February 1995	Wrexham	A	2–1	Booth, Jepson	5,894	2nd
18 February 1995	Cardiff City	H	5–1	Booth, Cowan, Jepson, Reid, Crosby	10,035	2nd
21 February 1995	Brentford	A	0–0		9,562	2nd
25 February 1995	Brighton & Hove Albion	A	0–0		7,751	3rd
28 February 1995	York City	H	3–0	Jepson, Bullock, Crosby	10,468	1st
4 March 1995	Bradford City	H	0–0		17,404	1st
7 March 1995	Oxford United	A	1–3	Dyson	7,160	2nd
11 March 1995	Chester City	H	5–1	Cowan, Jepson, Booth (3)	9,606	2nd
18 March 1995	Leyton Orient	A	2–0	Dunn, Jepson (pen)	3,177	2nd
21 March 1995	Plymouth Argyle	H	2–0	Dyson, Booth	12,099	1st
25 March 1995	Stockport County	H	2–1	Jepson (pen), Gannon (og)	5,383	1st
1 April 1995	Peterborough United	H	1–2	Bullock	11,324	2nd
8 April 1995	Swansea City	H	2–0	Crosby (2)	10,105	1st
15 April 1995	Rotherham United	A	1–1	Booth	6,687	1st
17 April 1995	Hull City	H	1–1	Sinnott	12,402	2nd
22 April 1995	Shrewsbury Town	A	1–2	Jepson (pen)	4,758	3rd
29 April 1995	Cambridge United	A	1–1	Booth	5,188	3rd
6 May 1995	Birmingham City	H	1–2	Moulden	17,959	5th

=== Promotion play-offs ===
Date	Round	Opponents	Home/ Away	Result F – A	Scorers	Attendance
14 May 1995	Semi-final first Leg	Brentford	H	1–1	Billy	14,160
17 May 1995	Semi-final second Leg	Brentford	A	1–1	Booth	11,161: 2–2 on aggregate.

	Penalties
Grainger (penalty scored); Taylor (penalty scored); Mundee: Francis saved (penalty missed); Ratcliffe (penalty scored); Bates: Francis saved (penalty missed)	3–4	(penalty scored) Jepson; (penalty missed) Scully: Dearden saved (penalty scored) Duxbury; (penalty scored) Sinnott; (penalty scored) Bullock

=== Play-off final ===
Date	Opponents	Home/ Away	Result F – A	Scorers	Attendance
28 May 1995	Bristol Rovers	N	2–1	Booth, Billy	59,175

=== FA Cup ===
Date	Round	Opponents	Home/ Away	Result F – A	Scorers	Attendance
12 November 1994	First round	Doncaster Rovers	A	4–1	Bullock, Booth, Jepson, Dunn	6,626
3 December 1994	Second round	Lincoln City	A	0–1		4,143

=== League Cup ===
Date	Round	Opponents	Home/ Away	Result F – A	Scorers	Attendance
16 August 1994	First round first leg	Scunthorpe United	A	1–2	Scully	2,841
23 August 1994	First round second leg	Scunthorpe United	H	3–0	Jepson (2), Reid	6,445: Huddersfield won 4–2 on aggregate
20 September 1994	Second round first leg	Southampton	H	0–1		13,765
5 October 1994	Second round second leg	Southampton	A	0–4		12,032: Huddersfield lost 5–0 on aggregate

=== League Trophy ===
Date	Round	Opponents	Home/ Away	Result F – A	Scorers	Attendance
11 October 1994	First round Group 7	Bradford City	A	2–1	Baldry, Booth	3,772
18 October 1994	First round Group 7	York City	H	3–0	Mitchell, Clayton, Starbuck (pen)	4,183
30 November 1994	Second round	Lincoln City	H	3–2 (aet: 90 mins: 2–2)	Crosby, Jepson (pen), Dunn (gg)	5,738
24 January 1995	Area quarter-final	Bury	A	1–2	Clayton	3,311

== Appearances and goals ==
Name	Nationality	Position	League		FA Cup		League Cup		Football League Trophy		Play-offs		Total	
Name	Nationality	Position	Apps	Goals	Apps	Goals	Apps	Goals	Apps	Goals	Apps	Goals	Apps	Goals
Simon Baldry	England	MF	8 (3)	0	0	0	2	0	0 (2)	1	0	0	10 (5)	1
Chris Billy	England	MF	30 (7)	2	2	0	3 (1)	0	3 (1)	0	3	2	41 (9)	4
Kevin Blackwell	England	GK	3 (1)	0	1	0	0 (1)	0	3	0	0	0	7 (2)	0
Andy Booth	England	FW	45 (1)	26	2	1	4	0	2 (1)	1	3	2	56 (2)	30
Darren Bullock	England	MF	39	6	2	1	3	0	0	0	3	0	47	7
Gary Clayton	England	MF	0 (2)	0	0 (1)	0	0	0	4	2	0	0	4 (3)	2
Simon Collins	England	DF	2 (2)	0	0	0	0	0	1 (1)	0	0	0	3 (3)	0
Tom Cowan	Scotland	DF	37	2	2	0	4	0	2	0	3	0	48	2
Gary Crosby	England	MF	16 (3)	4	1	0	1	0	2 (2)	1	3	0	23 (5)	5
Iain Dunn	England	FW	13 (26)	5	0 (2)	1	1 (2)	0	3	1	0 (3)	0	17 (33)	7
Lee Duxbury	England	MF	26	2	0	0	0	0	0	0	3	0	29	2
Jon Dyson	England	DF	23 (5)	2	0	0	4	0	1 (1)	0	0 (1)	0	28 (7)	2
Steve Francis	England	GK	43	0	1	0	4	0	1	0	3	0	52	0
Kevin Gray	England	DF	5	0	0	0	0	0	3	0	0	0	8	0
Ronnie Jepson	England	FW	36 (5)	19	2	1	3 (1)	2	4	1	3	0	48 (6)	23
Richard Logan	England	MF	24 (3)	1	1	0	3	0	3	0	0	0	31 (3)	1
Graham Mitchell	England	DF	11 (1)	0	2	0	0	0	3	1	0	0	16 (1)	1
Paul Moulden	England	FW	0 (2)	0	0	0	0	0	0	0	0	0	0 (2)	0
Paul Reid	England	MF	42	6	2	0	3	1	1	0	0	0	48	7
Pat Scully	Republic of Ireland	DF	38	1	2	0	4	1	2	1	3	0	49	3
Chris Short	England	DF	6	0	0	0	0	0	1	0	0	0	7	0
Lee Sinnott	England	DF	25	1	0	0	0	0	0	0	3	0	28	1
Phil Starbuck	England	FW	4 (5)	1	0	0	3	0	2	1	0	0	9 (5)	2
Simon Trevitt	England	DF	20 (1)	0	2	0	2	0	2	0	3	0	29 (1)	0
Craig Whitington	England	FW	1	0	0	0	0	0	0	0	0	0	1	0
Paul Williams (1st Spell)	England	DF	2	0	0	0	0	0	1	0	0	0	3	0
Paul Williams (2nd Spell)	England	DF	7	0	0	0	0	0	0	0	0	0	7	0
