= 1995 Football League Second Division play-off final =

Association football match

- The match took place at Wembley Stadium.
Huddersfield Town	Bristol Rovers
2	1
- Date: 28 May 1995
- Venue: Wembley Stadium, London
- Referee: Clive Wilkes (Gloucester)
- Attendance: 59,175

The 1995 Football League Second Division play-off final was an association football match which was played on 28 May 1995 at Wembley Stadium, London, between Huddersfield Town and Bristol Rovers. It was to determine the second team to gain promotion from the Football League Second Division to the First Division. Only Birmingham City, the champions of the 1994–95 Football League Second Division league, gained automatic promotion to the First Division due to the reduction of the Premier League from 22 to 20 teams. The sides placed from second to fifth place in the table took part in play-offs. The winners of the play-off semi-finals competed for the final place for the 1995–96 season in the First Division. The losing semi-finalists were Brentford and Crewe Alexandra who had been defeated by Huddersfield and Bristol Rovers respectively.

The referee for the match, played in front of a Second Division play-off final record attendance of 59,175, was Clive Wilkes. In injury time in the first half, an overhead kick from Ronnie Jepson was eventually headed in by Andy Booth for his 30th goal of the season to give Huddersfield the lead. Just over a minute later, Marcus Stewart scored the equaliser for Bristol Rovers with a volley after Justin Channing headed on Worrell Sterling's throw-in. It was Stewart's 24th goal of the season. In the 80th minute, Iain Dunn came on as a substitute and his first touch of the match a minute later was to deliver a cross which Booth headed back across the goalmouth for Chris Billy to score to make it 2–1. In the final minute of the match, Stewart's shot from around 25 yards (23 m) hit the frame of the Huddersfield goal with the goalkeeper Steve Francis beaten. The match ended 2–1 and Huddersfield were promoted to the First Division.

Huddersfield's manager, Neil Warnock, left his newly promoted club days after the win at Wembley and soon after took up the managerial position at Plymouth Argyle who had been relegated to the Third Division after finishing in 21st position in the league. Huddersfield Town's next season saw them finish in eighth position in the First Division, two places below the play-offs. Bristol Rovers ended their following season in tenth place in the Second Division league table, four positions outside the play-offs.

== Route to the final ==
Football League Second Division final table, leading positions
Pos	Team	Pld	W	D	L	GF	GA	GD	Pts
1	Birmingham City	46	25	14	7	84	37	+47	89
2	Brentford	46	25	10	11	81	39	+42	85
3	Crewe Alexandra	46	25	8	13	80	68	+12	83
4	Bristol Rovers	46	22	16	8	70	40	+30	82
5	Huddersfield Town	46	22	15	9	79	49	+30	81

Bristol Rovers finished the regular 1994–95 season in fourth place in the Second Division, the third tier of the English football league system, one position ahead of Huddersfield Town. The reduction of the Premier League from 22 to 20 teams meant that both missed out on the single automatic place for promotion to the First Division and instead took part in the play-offs to determine the second promoted club. Bristol Rovers finished seven points behind league winners Birmingham City. Huddersfield Town ended the season one point behind Bristol Rovers.

Huddersfield Town's opponents for their play-off semi-final were Brentford with the first match of the two-legged tie taking place at the McAlpine Stadium in Huddersfield on 14 May 1995. In the 9th minute, Huddersfield took the lead after Andy Booth's low cross found Chris Billy who controlled the ball before striking it into the Brentford goal. Nicky Forster levelled the game four minutes before half-time with a volley from a Paul Smith pass. The second half was goalless and the match ended 1–1. The return leg of the play-off semi-final was held three days later at Griffin Park in Brentwood. In the 19th minute, Brentford's Paul Stephenson was brought down in the penalty area and the referee awarded a penalty, which was scored by Martin Grainger. The Brentford goalkeeper Kevin Dearden then fumbled the ball under pressure from Darren Bullock which allowed Booth to equalise, and the first half ended level. No goals were scored in the second half so the game went to extra time which also remained goalless with Grainger's last-minute free-kick being blocked. The match then went to a penalty shootout and although Pat Scully missed the second spot-kick for Huddersfield, their goalkeeper Steve Francis saved strikes from both Denny Mundee and Jamie Bates. Bullock then scored to send Huddersfield to the final with a 4–3 aggregate victory.

Bristol Rovers faced Crewe Alexandra in the other play-off semi-final and the first leg was held on 14 May 1995 at Twerton Park in Bath, a ground which Rovers shared with non-League club Bath City. Bristol Rovers dominated the match but with two goal-line clearances being made by Crewe, first by Worrell Sterling and then Danny Murphy ensured the game ended goalless. The second leg took place three days later at Gresty Road in Crewe. Regular time ended without a goal being scored so the match went into extra time in which Darran Rowbotham put Crewe ahead mid-way through the first period. Paul Miller equalised for the visitors. The match ended 1–1 and Bristol Rovers progressed to the final on the away goals rule.

== Match ==
=== Background ===
Bristol Rovers had made one previous appearance in the play-offs when they lost 2–1 on aggregate to Port Vale in the 1989 Football League Third Division play-off final. They had played in the third tier of English football since being relegated from the Second Division in the 1992–93 season. Huddersfield Town were also appearing in the play-offs for a second occasion, having lost 4–3 on aggregate to Peterborough United in the 1992 semi-finals. They had been relegated to the third tier in the 1987–88 season and had played there ever since. In the two league matches between the sides during the regular season, both ended in 1–1 draws. Huddersfield manager Neil Warnock had led a team out at a Wembley final three times in the previous four seasons, including two play-off final wins with Notts County in 1990 and 1991.

The referee for the match was Clive Wilkes. Huddersfield Town adopted a 4–4–2 formation while Bristol Rovers played as a 4–2–4.

=== Summary ===
The match kicked off around 3 p.m. on 28 May 1995 in front of a crowd of 59,175, a record attendance for a Second Division play-off final. In injury time in the first half, an overhead kick from Ronnie Jepson was eventually headed in by Booth for his 30th goal of the season to give Huddersfield the lead. Just over a minute later, Stewart scored the equaliser for Bristol Rovers with a volley after Justin Channing headed on Sterling's throw-in. It was Stewart's 24th goal of the season. Eight minutes into the second half, the ball rebounded from the Huddersfield crossbar but Taylor missed from 3 yards (2.7 m). Two minutes later, Jon Dyson came on to replace Simon Trevitt in Huddersfield's first substitution of the match.

In the 80th minute, Iain Dunn was then brought on for Gary Crosby while Bristol Rovers made their first change at the same time with Marcus Browning replacing Taylor. Dunn's first touch of the match a minute later was to deliver a cross which Booth headed back across the goalmouth for Billy to score. Lee Archer then came on for Channing for Bristol Rovers in the 84th minute. Two minutes later, a 25 yards (23 m) strike from Browning was tipped over by Francis. In the final minute of the match, Stewart's shot from around 25 yards (23 m) hit the frame of the Huddersfield goal with Francis beaten. The match ended 2–1 and Huddersfield were promoted to the First Division.

=== Details ===
28 May 1995
15:00 BST

Huddersfield Town	2–1	Bristol Rovers
Booth 45'; Billy 81'	Report	45+1' Stewart

Wembley Stadium, London
Attendance: 59,175
Referee: Clive Wilkes (Gloucester)

Huddersfield Town	Bristol Rovers

GK	1	Steve Francis
DF	2	Simon Trevitt	(substituted off) 56'
DF	3	Tom Cowan
MF	4	Darren Bullock
DF	5	Lee Sinnott (c)
DF	6	Pat Scully
MF	7	Chris Billy
MF	8	Lee Duxbury
FW	9	Andy Booth
FW	10	Ronnie Jepson
MF	11	Gary Crosby	(substituted off) 80'
Substitutes:
FW	12	Iain Dunn	(substituted in) 80'
GK	13	Kevin Blackwell
DF	14	Jon Dyson	(substituted in) 56'
Manager:
Neil Warnock

GK	1	Brian Parkin
DF	2	David Pritchard
DF	3	Andy Gurney
FW	4	Marcus Stewart
DF	5	Billy Clark
DF	6	Andy Tillson (c)
MF	7	Worrell Sterling
MF	8	Paul Miller
FW	9	Gareth Taylor	(substituted off) 80'
MF	10	Justin Skinner
MF	11	Justin Channing	(substituted off) 84'
Substitutes:
MF	12	Marcus Browning	(substituted in) 80'
GK	13	Andy Collett
MF	14	Lee Archer	(substituted in) 84'
Manager:
John Ward

== Post-match ==
The victory was Huddersfield Town's first win at the national stadium in five finals over a 67-year period. Warnock had been working without a contract and suggested that Huddersfield "had to think big and be big ... Whether it's with me or not, the club will go forwards." He stated that he and Huddersfield chairman, David Fisher, would be meeting and they had "got to speak a lot." He went on to note that he was "not the sort of manager who goes anywhere lightly." Warnock left his newly promoted club eight days after the win at Wembley and soon after took up the managerial position at Plymouth Argyle who had been relegated to the Third Division after finishing in 21st position in the league. In a 2020 interview, Warnock confirmed that "getting promotion was the stand-out memory. It was a fabulous time" but that he "fell-out with the chairman after he told me a porky pie [a lie] and left a few days later".

Huddersfield Town's next season saw them finish in eighth position in the First Division, two places below the play-offs. Bristol Rovers ended their following season in tenth position in the Second Division league table, four places outside the play-offs.
