= 1995–96 Huddersfield Town A.F.C. season =

Huddersfield Town
1995–96 season
- Chairman: Geoffrey Headey
- Manager: Brian Horton
- Stadium: Kirklees Stadium
- Division One: 8th
- FA Cup: Fifth round (eliminated by Wimbledon)
- League Cup: Second round (eliminated by Barnsley)
- Top goalscorer: League: Andy Booth (16); All: Andy Booth (21)
- Highest home attendance: 17,878 vs Derby County (26 December 1995)
- Lowest home attendance: 5,094 vs Port Vale (15 August 1995)
- Average home league attendance: 13,151
- Biggest win: 3–0 vs Barnsley (12 September 1995); 4–1 vs West Bromwich Albion (16 December 1995); 3–0 vs Crystal Palace (24 February 1996)
- Biggest defeat: 0–4 vs Barnsley (3 October 1995)

Huddersfield Town's 1995–96 campaign was Town's first season in the second tier since the 1987–88 season. They finished in 8th place, just 8 points and 2 places below the play-offs.

The closed season saw the departure of the hugely successful strike partnership of Andy Booth and Ronnie Jepson, whose goals had been vital to Huddersfield's success in the previous two seasons. Booth left for Premier League club Sheffield Wednesday in a club record £2.7 million deal while Jepson left to 2nd Division Bury on a free transfer. Horton invested the money in the prolific Bristol Rovers striker Marcus Stewart (for a club record £1.2 million), Barnsley's Andy Payton (£350,000) and Blackpool defender Andy Morrison (£500,000).

== Squad at the start of the season ==
Note: Flags indicate national team as defined under FIFA eligibility rules; some limited exceptions apply. Players may hold more than one non-FIFA nationality.

No.	Pos.	Nation	Player
--	GK	ENG	Steve Francis
--	GK	WAL	Tony Norman
--	DF	SCO	Tom Cowan
--	DF	ENG	Jon Dyson
--	DF	ENG	Kevin Gray
--	DF	WAL	Steve Jenkins
--	DF	IRL	Robbie Ryan
--	DF	IRL	Pat Scully
--	DF	ENG	Lee Sinnott
--	DF	ENG	Simon Trevitt
--	MF	ENG	Simon Baldry

No.	Pos.	Nation	Player
--	MF	ENG	Darren Bullock
--	MF	ENG	Simon Collins
--	MF	ENG	Gary Crosby
--	MF	ENG	Paul Dalton
--	MF	ENG	Lee Duxbury
--	MF	ENG	Richard Logan
--	MF	ENG	Paul Reid
--	FW	ENG	Andy Booth
--	FW	ENG	Iain Dunn
--	FW	ENG	Ronnie Jepson

== Review ==
Following Town's promotion the previous season, many were surprised that manager Neil Warnock resigned to become manager of Plymouth Argyle. A few days later, the ex-Manchester City and Oxford United manager Brian Horton was hired as his replacement. They had a bad start to the season, losing 3–0 to local rivals Oldham Athletic at Boundary Park, but they managed to recover with convincing wins against Watford, Birmingham City, Charlton Athletic and Ipswich Town soon set Town players and fans alight.

Town did have a good middle part of the season, going on a run of only 2 losses in 19 league games losing only to Port Vale and eventual champions Derby County. They also put on a good run in the FA Cup, which saw them reach the last 16 for the first time since the 1971–72 season. They eventually lost in a replay to Premier League side Wimbledon, having been seconds away from knocking them out in the original tie, only for Efan Ekoku to score a 93rd-minute equaliser for the Dons.

Town seemed to be on course for a play-off spot, but the end of the season saw Town lose 8 of their last 13 games, winning only 3 of them. They finished in 8th place, but a better end to the season might have seen Town get nearer to the play-offs for the Premier League.

== Squad at the end of the season ==
Note: Flags indicate national team as defined under FIFA eligibility rules; some limited exceptions apply. Players may hold more than one non-FIFA nationality.

No.	Pos.	Nation	Player
--	GK	ENG	Steve Francis
--	GK	WAL	Tony Norman
--	DF	SCO	Tom Cowan
--	DF	ENG	Jon Dyson
--	DF	ENG	Kevin Gray
--	DF	WAL	Steve Jenkins
--	DF	IRL	Robbie Ryan
--	DF	IRL	Pat Scully
--	DF	ENG	Lee Sinnott
--	MF	ENG	Simon Baldry
--	MF	ENG	Darren Bullock
--	MF	ENG	Simon Collins

No.	Pos.	Nation	Player
--	MF	ENG	Gary Crosby
--	MF	ENG	Paul Dalton
--	MF	ENG	Rob Edwards
--	MF	ENG	Lee Makel
--	MF	ENG	Paul Reid
--	MF	ENG	Ben Thornley (on loan from Manchester United)
--	MF	ENG	Mark Ward
--	FW	ENG	Andy Booth
--	FW	ENG	Iain Dunn
--	FW	ENG	Ronnie Jepson
--	FW	ENG	Rodney Rowe

== Results ==
=== Division One ===
Date	Opponents	Home/ Away	Result F – A	Scorers	Attendance	Position
12 August 1995	Oldham Athletic	A	0–3		10,259	24th
19 August 1995	Watford	H	1–0	Jepson	10,556	18th
26 August 1995	Tranmere Rovers	A	1–3	Cowan	9,072	19th
30 August 1995	Birmingham City	H	4–2	Dalton (2), Jepson, Bullock	12,305	11th
2 September 1995	Charlton Athletic	A	1–2	Booth	9,570	12th
9 September 1995	Ipswich Town	H	2–1	Collins, Sedgley (og)	12,057	10th
12 September 1995	Barnsley	H	3–0	Jepson, Collins, Booth	14,635	3rd
16 September 1995	Crystal Palace	A	0–0		15,645	5th
24 September 1995	Sheffield United	H	1–2	Jepson	12,840	10th
30 September 1995	West Bromwich Albion	A	2–1	Cowan, Booth	15,945	5th
7 October 1995	Port Vale	H	0–2		11,559	9th
14 October 1995	Reading	A	1–3	Booth	8,534	14th
21 October 1995	Sunderland	H	1–1	Booth	16,054	11th
28 October 1995	Southend United	A	0–0		5,128	13th
4 November 1995	Norwich City	H	3–2	Jepson, Jenkins, Dalton	13,747	9th
11 November 1995	Portsmouth	A	1–1	Scully	6,876	11th
18 November 1995	Millwall	A	0–0		9,402	12th
21 November 1995	Leicester City	H	3–1	Bullock (2), Dalton	14,300	10th
25 November 1995	Wolverhampton Wanderers	H	2–1	Booth, Dalton	16,423	8th
2 December 1995	Port Vale	A	0–1		7,701	11th
9 December 1995	Sheffield United	A	2–0	Booth, Bullock	12,126	10th
16 December 1995	West Bromwich Albion	H	4–1	Turner, Jepson (2), Booth	12,664	4th
23 December 1995	Luton Town	A	2–2	Booth, Makel	7,076	5th
26 December 1995	Derby County	H	0–1		17,878	7th
30 December 1995	Stoke City	H	1–1	Prudhoe (og)	15,071	6th
1 January 1996	Grimsby Town	A	1–1	Jepson (pen)	7,524	4th
13 January 1996	Watford	A	1–0	Bullock	7,568	2nd
20 January 1996	Oldham Athletic	H	0–0		13,013	3rd
3 February 1996	Tranmere Rovers	H	1–0	Collins	12,041	3rd
20 February 1996	Charlton Athletic	H	2–2	Booth, Rowe	10,951	4th
24 February 1996	Crystal Palace	H	3–0	Booth, Jepson (pen), Makel	13,041	4th
2 March 1996	Derby County	A	2–3	Booth, Thornley	17,097	5th
9 March 1996	Luton Town	H	1–0	Edwards	11,950	6th
12 March 1996	Birmingham City	A	0–2		15,296	6th
16 March 1996	Stoke City	A	1–1	Edwards	13,157	6th
19 March 1996	Barnsley	A	0–3		10,660	7th
24 March 1996	Grimsby Town	H	1–3	Jepson	12,090	7th
30 March 1996	Sunderland	A	2–3	Edwards, Booth	20,130	8th
2 April 1996	Reading	H	3–1	Edwards (2), Booth	11,828	6th
6 April 1996	Southend United	H	3–1	Jepson, Edwards, Booth	11,558	6th
8 April 1996	Norwich City	A	0–2		13,021	6th
13 April 1996	Millwall	H	3–0	Jepson (pen), Edwards, Booth	11,206	6th
20 April 1996	Leicester City	A	1–2	Bullock	17,619	8th
27 April 1996	Wolverhampton Wanderers	A	0–0		25,290	8th
1 May 1996	Ipswich Town	A	1–2	Thornley	17,473	8th
5 May 1996	Portsmouth	H	0–1		14,091	8th

=== FA Cup ===
Date	Round	Opponents	Home/ Away	Result F – A	Scorers	Attendance
6 January 1996	Round 3	Blackpool	H	2–1	Jepson (2, 1 pen)	12,424
6 February 1996	Round 4	Peterborough United	H	2–0	Bullock, Booth	11,629
17 February 1996	Round 5	Wimbledon	H	2–2	Rowe, Cowan	17,167
28 February 1996	Round 5 Replay	Wimbledon	A	1–3	Booth	7,015

=== League Cup ===
Date	Round	Opponents	Home/ Away	Result F – A	Scorers	Attendance
15 August 1995	Round 1 1st Leg	Port Vale	H	1–2	Dalton	5,363
22 August 1995	Round 1 2nd Leg	Port Vale	A	3–1	Bullock, Booth (2)	4,380: Huddersfield won 4–3 on aggregate
19 September 1995	Round 2 1st Leg	Barnsley	H	2–0	Collins, Booth	8,264
3 October 1995	Round 2 2nd Leg	Barnsley	A	0–4		8,192: Huddersfield lost 4–2 on aggregate

== Appearances and goals ==
Name	Nationality	Position	League		FA Cup		League Cup		Total	
Name	Nationality	Position	Apps	Goals	Apps	Goals	Apps	Goals	Apps	Goals
Simon Baldry	England	MF	3 (11)	0	0	0	0 (1)	0	3 (12)	0
Andy Booth	England	FW	43	16	4	2	4	3	51	21
Kenny Brown	England	DF	5	0	0	0	0	0	5	0
Darren Bullock	England	MF	42	6	4	1	4	1	50	8
Simon Collins	England	DF	18 (12)	3	1 (2)	0	4	1	23 (14)	4
Tom Cowan	Scotland	DF	43	2	4	1	4	0	51	3
Gary Crosby	England	MF	0 (1)	0	0	0	1	0	1 (1)	0
Paul Dalton	England	MF	29	5	3 (1)	0	4	1	36 (1)	6
Iain Dunn	England	FW	3 (11)	0	1 (1)	0	1 (2)	0	5 (14)	0
Lee Duxbury	England	MF	3	0	0	0	1	0	4	0
Jon Dyson	England	DF	15 (2)	0	0	0	2	0	17 (2)	0
Rob Edwards	England	MF	13	7	0	0	0	0	13	7
Steve Francis	England	GK	43	0	4	0	3	0	50	0
Kevin Gray	England	DF	38	0	4	0	1	0	43	0
Steve Jenkins	Wales	DF	31	1	4	0	0	0	35	1
Ronnie Jepson	England	FW	40 (3)	12	2	2	3	0	45 (3)	14
Richard Logan	England	MF	2	0	0	0	0	0	2	0
Lee Makel	England	MF	33	2	4	0	0	0	37	2
Tony Norman	Wales	GK	3	0	0	0	1	0	4	0
Paul Reid	England	MF	8 (5)	0	2	0	2	0	12 (5)	0
Rodney Rowe	England	FW	6 (8)	1	3 (1)	1	0 (1)	0	9 (10)	2
Pat Scully	Republic of Ireland	DF	25	1	0	0	3	0	28	1
Lee Sinnott	England	DF	32	0	4	0	4	0	40	0
Ben Thornley	England	MF	12	2	0	0	0	0	12	2
Simon Trevitt	England	DF	4	0	0	0	2	0	6	0
Andy Turner	England	MF	2 (3)	1	0	0	0	0	2 (3)	1
Mark Ward	England	FW	7 (1)	0	0	0	0	0	7 (1)	0
Jon Whitney	England	DF	3 (1)	0	0	0	0 (1)	0	3 (2)	0
