= Simon Baldry =

English footballer

Simon Jonathon Baldry
Personal information
- Full name: Simon Jonathon Baldry
- Date of birth: 14 February 1976 (age 50)
- Place of birth: Huddersfield, West Yorkshire, England
- Position: Winger

Youth career
- Huddersfield Town

Senior career*
Years	Team	Apps	(Gls)
1992–2012	Huddersfield Town	210	(30)
1998	→ Bury (loan)	5	(5)
2003–2004	Notts County	16	(5)
2008–2009	Ossett Town	51	(12)
2009–2010	Bradford Park Avenue	57	(12)
2010–2012	Guiseley AFC	55	(12)
2012	Bradford Park Avenue	3	(5)
2012 –	Ossett Town		
- * Club domestic league appearances and goals as of 20:02, 24 November 2009 (UTC)

Simon Jonathon Baldry (14 February 1976) is an English retired professional footballer who played in the Football League for Huddersfield Town, Bury and Notts County.

== Career ==
=== Huddersfield Town ===
Simon Baldry was a youth player who came through the Huddersfield Town Centre of Excellence system. He was also a well known player at amateur clubs Stile Common and Deighton, before signing a professional contract with Huddersfield Town in 1994 at the age of 17. He would spend the next 9 years at the club before leaving in May 2003.

While playing for Huddersfield he won numerous footballing awards including the Player of the Year Award and the Pontins Holidays League Player of the Year Award. He also scored one of the most valuable goals in the club's history and became well known for his physical strength, pace and skills on the football field.

The same year that he signed his first professional contract with Huddersfield, Baldry became the youngest footballer in the club's history to have played in a cup final at Wembley Stadium. The player also had double features in football magazines FourFourTwo and Match, which described Baldry as "a confident, young Keith Gillespie with a keen eye for goal". He was also hailed as "a teenage wizkid" and referred to as "Huddersfield Town's most naturally talented apprentice". In May 1995, Baldry was named Young Player of the Year by Shoot magazine.

On 30 April 1994 Baldry scored the first goal in Huddersfield's 2–1 win against Blackpool. This goal is very well remembered as it was scored in the club's final game at their former Leeds Road ground before moving to the then Alfred McAlpine Stadium.

On 18 April 1998 in the 1997–98 season, Baldry scored the goal that saved Huddersfield Town from relegation of the old First Division. Huddersfield played West Bromwich Albion in a game which resulted in a 1–0 victory for the home side.

Throughout his time at Huddersfield and his career in general, Baldry has often been hampered by injuries. This has sometimes resulted in him missing some of the biggest games of his career, most notably against Liverpool in the FA Cup quarter finals in December 1999.

The player's injuries also deterred other clubs from offering him a contract. In the Autumn of 2000 Middlesbrough, a then Premier League club, offered Huddersfield £1 million for the player after previously noticing Baldry in a friendly. The move was a complete deal until Baldry became injured while involved in a medical at the club.

Other clubs such as Barnsley, Nottingham Forest and Sheffield United all showed a strong interest in Baldry, but each deal fell through due to the player either failing a medical or undergoing some other form of personal sickness. It always seemed like once the player was set for a move to a higher club his fitness would be suffering or begin to suffer with some type of injury.

Despite the players' health issues, in late 2000 Huddersfield offered Baldry a 3-year contract extension, a deal that would make Baldry a Huddersfield Town player up to the year of 2003.

On 2 July 2010, Baldry was named one of eight footballers selected to take part in Huddersfield Town's squad for the 2010 Yorkshire Masters tournament. The event took place on 25 July 2010 at the Sheffield Arena and was televised by Sky Sports.

As well as Huddersfield Town the competition featured other football clubs from the Yorkshire region, such as Barnsley, Hull City, Sheffield United, Sheffield Wednesday and Doncaster Rovers.

Huddersfield made it to the second round of the competition before been knocked out by Sheffield Wednesday. Baldry received a bottle of champagne for winning the Golden Boot Award and was also said to be the most skilful, entertaining player in the tournament.

On 19 July 2010, Baldry was named one of a number of former Huddersfield players selected to take part in a Huddersfield Town charity game. The match was played against a David Brown 11 and took place at Warrenside, the home of Huddersfield-based amateur club Yorkshire Lions FC.

The charity involved was the Hollybank Trust, which is a company dedicated to helping people with learning difficulties and donating money to orphaned children. The charity also supports specialist schools, residential homes and provides medical treatment to patients alongside the National Health Service.

The Huddersfield Examiner provided coverage of the game and there were appearances from former Town favourites Kevin Gray, Rodney Rowe, Martin Smith, Rob Edwards, Jon Dyson, Chris Billy and Club Ambassador Andy Booth amongst others.

=== Bury (loan) ===
Baldry spent a month on loan at Bury in the early stages of the 1998–99 season. While at the club the player made 5 first team appearances and 5 reserve team appearances, scoring one goal for the reserves and claiming various goal assists in both teams.

As a result of the loan deal Bury made Huddersfield an offer of £200,000 for the midfielder. The move looked a done deal until Huddersfield recalled Baldry back to the club and marked the player as "not for sale" upon his return. It is thought that Bury were asking for a price-cut on Baldry, under-valuing the player and causing the move to be permanently halted through a disagreement. Baldry then became largely involved in Huddersfield Town's "Great Escape" campaign and would later go on to score the goal that saved the club from relegation.

Bury were then managed by former Huddersfield boss Neil Warnock, the man that signed Baldry to his first professional football contract in 1994. Despite being unsuccessful in again signing the player in 1998, Warnock always maintained a strong interest in Baldry and would again attempt to sign the player after becoming the manager of Sheffield United a year later. He would also try again in late 2000, offering the player guaranteed first team football and the number 11 shirt, before Baldry then signed extended terms to his contract with Huddersfield.

=== Notts County ===
After leaving Huddersfield Town in the summer of 2003, Baldry started training with Boston United before signing for Notts County following a strong interest from the club. In his debut season he produced some of the best football of his career and instantly became a fan favourite. He was named club captain for a short period and was involved in every game the club played up until becoming injured mid-season.

On 23 September 2003 Baldry scored his first goal for the club in Notts County's 2–1 League Cup win over Ipswich Town. Baldry was credited with a man of the match performance and was also named in the Football League's team of the week for the old Division Two.

When Baldry first signed for Notts County the club were financially unstable as they were just coming out of administration. This meant that Baldry was signed on a month-to-month basis until the club were in a better position to offer the player a stable contract.

On 16 February 2004 Baldry signed a deal with the club that would make him a County player until the end of the season. However, despite the player securing a permanent contract with the club, Baldry became injured during a training session and was out of action for almost 5 weeks. He did not return until 18 March 2004 when Notts County took on Wycombe Wanderers in the old Division Two.

Baldry made a total of 41 appearances in all competitions for Notts County. His last game for the club came when they played Oldham Athletic in the final match of the 2003–04 season, a 1–1 draw on 8 May 2004.

Baldry was then released by the club and took part in unsuccessful trials at Blackpool and Telford United, before undergoing a number of operations for a hernia problem. The player would not return to the football field for more than three years.

=== Ossett Town ===
On 5 January 2008 Baldry joined Northern Premier League club Ossett Town, then managed by former Huddersfield Town player Simon Collins.

=== Bradford Park Avenue ===
On 24 July 2009 Baldry joined Northern Premier League club Bradford Park Avenue. He enjoyed a very successful time with the club becoming first team captain in his first season, as well as first team coach. He won the Player of the Year Award in his first season and also guided the club to the play-off finals, in which Park Avenue missed out on promotion after losing to Boston United.

=== Guiseley ===
Baldry joined Conference North club Guiseley in a permanent deal in December 2010. He left the club in May 2012.

== Personal life ==
Baldry was born in Huddersfield, West Yorkshire and raised on the old Brackenhall estate in Huddersfield.

The player is also a former pupil of the old Deighton High School, which was based in Huddersfield and has now closed.

== Honours ==
Huddersfield Town

- Football League Trophy runner-up: 1993–94
