= Lee Sinnott =

English footballer and manager

Personal information
- Full name: Lee Sinnott
- Date of birth: 12 July 1965 (age 61)
- Place of birth: Pelsall, England
- Height: 6 ft 1 in (1.85 m)
- Position: Defender

Youth career
- 19??–1982: Walsall

Senior career*
Years	Team	Apps	(Gls)
1982–1983	Walsall	40	(2)
1983–1987	Watford	78	(2)
1987–1991	Bradford City	173	(6)
1991–1993	Crystal Palace	55	(0)
1993–1994	Bradford City	34	(1)
1994–1997	Huddersfield Town	87	(1)
1997–1999	Oldham Athletic	31	(0)
1998	→ Bradford City (loan)	7	(0)
1999–2000	Scarborough	22	(0)
Total		527	(12)

International career
1983	England Youth	4	(1)
1985	England U21	1	(0)

Managerial career
- 2003–2007: Farsley Celtic
- 2007–2008: Port Vale
- 2009: Bradford Park Avenue
- 2011–2016: Altrincham
- 2018–2019: Gainsborough Trinity
- * Club domestic league appearances and goals

Lee Sinnott (born 12 July 1965) is an English former professional football player and manager.

As a player, he was a defender for Walsall, Watford, Bradford City, Crystal Palace, Huddersfield Town, Oldham Athletic and Scarborough. His biggest impact was at Bradford City, where he stayed for five years over two spells, making over 200 appearances. He made 505 appearances in the English Football League and 653 in all competitions. He played in the 1984 FA Cup final for Watford, taking home a runners-up medal.

As manager of Farsley Celtic between 2003 and 2007, he won promotion three times in four seasons to take the club from the Northern Premier League to the Conference. This was followed by a short spell at Port Vale in the 2007–08 season. He managed Bradford Park Avenue for ten months in 2009 before returning to the game with Altrincham in May 2011. He led Altrincham to promotion from the Conference North via the play-offs in 2014 but then left in March 2016. He returned to management with Gainsborough Trinity in February 2018, lasting 12 months.

== Playing career ==
Born in Aldridge, Staffordshire, he began his career at Walsall as an apprentice, signing professional in 1982. He was capped four times at England Youth level in 1983. He made 40 first-team appearances in his first season at Fellows Park before he was sold to First Division runners-up Watford for a £130,000 fee in September 1983. His final appearance for the "Saddlers" came in an 8–1 defeat at Bolton Wanderers. There he was coached by Steve Harrison, John Ward and Graham Taylor, whilst playing alongside veteran centre-back Steve Terry. He established himself in the first-team following Ian Bolton's departure and an injuries to Steve Sims and Paul Franklin. At the end of his first season, when still only 18 years old, he played in the 1984 FA Cup final against Everton at Wembley Stadium, collecting a runners-up medal. However, he went on to lose his place to new signing John McClelland and had to fit into the team as a full-back and at left midfield during the 1984–85 season. He helped Watford reach the semifinals of the FA Cup in the 1986–87 campaign and played at left-back across from Chris Waddle in the defeat to Tottenham Hotspur.

In 1987, Sinnott moved down a division to Bradford City. In his first season, he helped the "Bantams" qualify for the Second Division playoffs, but their promotion bid failed, and two years later they were relegated. Sinnott spent one season in the Third Division before moving to First Division side Crystal Palace for a £300,000 fee on 8 August 1991. He could not establish a regular place in the first team, and after two years, he returned to Bradford on 9 December 1993.

When Sinnott returned to Valley Parade, Bradford were still in the third tier of the English league. He played in most of their first-team games that season, but the "Bantams" missed out on the play-offs and manager Frank Stapleton was sacked. Sinnott followed his manager out of the exit door and signed for local rivals Huddersfield Town. He was made captain of Neil Warnock's team. He guided them to the Second Division play-off victory in his first season. He spent two more seasons in West Yorkshire before crossing the Pennines and signing for local rivals Oldham Athletic, who had just been relegated to the Second Division.

Sinnott played 31 games over two seasons at Boundary Park, but Oldham struggled in a division from which they had been expected to win promotion. In Sinnott's second season, they narrowly avoided relegation to the Third Division. A year earlier, he had been loaned back to Bradford, but the move was not made permanent.

The 1998–99 campaign proved to be Sinnott's final season as a Football League player. Upon its conclusion, he moved to Scarborough, who had just been relegated to the Conference and played 22 games in one season for a side that finished fourth in the country's highest non-League division. He then retired from playing after a career spanning almost 20 years.

== Style of play ==
Sinnott was a quick, athletic and versatile defender who boasted excellent long ball throwing ability.

== Managerial career ==
=== Farsley Celtic ===
Sinnott was not out of football for long and moved into management with non-League Farsley Celtic in June 2003. His first success with the club was a third-place finish in the Northern Premier League First Division in 2003–04, which earned the club promotion to the Northern Premier League.

Sinnott would have achieved another promotion in his second season at Throstle Nest as Farsley topped the Northern Premier League at the end of the season. However, this was only on the FA's decision that Spennymoor United's records were expunged after they folded. The other clubs in the promotion mix appealed and the FA reversed their decision to expunge the results, leaving Farsley in third place and having to compete in the play-offs. Despite a 1–0 semi-final win over Whitby Town, they lost in the final to Workington on penalties.

"I know the players aren't feeling that way at this moment in time – they are hurting – but they should be proud of themselves. Once the dust settles they can look back and realise they could have got promoted this season – twice. I couldn't have asked for any more from them. They have shown they have got what it takes to win this league and operate at a higher level. It's a long drive home but at least I can make it knowing we will move on from here without a shadow of a doubt."

— Sinnott remained full of positive energy despite the play-off defeat.

Another promotion was achieved in 2005–06, as Sinnott and Farsley returned from their play-off set-back. This time, Farsley finished fourth in the regulation season before defeating Marine 1–0 and then North Ferriby United 2–1 in the final. Sinnott also added the West Riding County Cup to Farsley's trophy cabinet for the tenth time in the club's history, as they made it a double-winning campaign in 2005–06.

The 2006–07 season saw Sinnott steer Farsley to a third promotion in four seasons. Despite finishing fifth in the Conference North, Lee lead the club to victory in the playoffs, ensuring Farsley Celtic's first-ever appearance in the top flight of Non-League. In the play off campaign, Farsley beat favourites Kettering Town in the semi-final before going on to beat Hinckley United in the final played at Burton Albion's Pirelli Stadium. In the final Farsley Celtic had been 3–2 down with just over ten minutes remaining before two late goals saw a remarkable comeback and a 4–3 victory.

Farsley's three promotions under Sinnott and the declines of Bradford City and their local rivals Leeds United meant that just one and two divisions separated Farsley from its neighbours when seven years earlier six divisions had separated them.

=== Port Vale ===
In October 2007, Sinnott was linked with the vacant job at League One team Port Vale, and on 1 November 2007, Farsley Celtic's chairman Andrew Firbank told fans that Sinnott would soon be leaving the club. However, hours later, confusion arose when Sinnott denied resigning. Five days later he was named the new Port Vale manager, ending the speculation about his future. Prominent backroom staff member Dean Glover had hoped to gain the management spot himself, and so pondered resigning from the club, but eventually chose to remain as Sinnott's assistant. The only significant staff member Sinnott was allowed to bring in was scout Steve Joesbury. In his first league game in charge Vale lost to local rivals Crewe Alexandra. Sinnott achieved his first win in charge of the club at Morecambe in the FA Cup first round, with Port Vale winning 2–0. However, the second round held embarrassment for both Sinnott and the club, as Southern League side Chasetown (an eighth tier team 101 league places below the Vale) picked up a 1–1 draw at Vale Park, before making a giant-killing with a late goal on their home ground, after Luke Rodgers missed two penalties. Sinnott warned of big changes at the club. He signed Chasetown duo Chris Slater and Kyle Perry, and heavily exploited the loan market. He ultimately proved unable to save the club from relegation, and they were relegated on 12 April 2008. With only 38 points from 46 games, they finished ahead of bottom-placed Luton Town only thanks to a ten-point deduction inflicted upon Luton. In the summer, ten players left or were offloaded by Sinnott, as he attempted to make room for new signings.

To make a success of the 2008–09 season, Sinnott brought in former Hereford United defender John McCombe, and former Middlesbrough midfielder Steve Thompson. Both players cited Sinnott as their reason for joining the club. He also added experienced defender Sam Stockley (Wycombe Wanderers); attacker Rob Taylor (Nuneaton Borough); midfielder Anthony Griffith (Doncaster Rovers); and attacking midfielder Louis Dodds (Leicester City) to the squad. Lee Collins also joined on an extended loan from Wolverhampton Wanderers, and would sign a permanent contract with the club in January. He appointed Stockley as his captain. The team continued to struggle, and on 18 September Sinnott admitted that "we are looking to improve, without a shadow of a doubt". However, a 4–1 home defeat to Macclesfield Town two days later would prove to be Sinnott's last game in charge. He was sacked two days later, with the "Valiants" in 16th place. Three months on from his sacking, the club were yet to reach a compensation settlement with Sinnott, before an agreement was reached in February 2009. The club went on to finish the season in 18th place under Dean Glover. Despite the poor results Vale picked up during his reign, many of Sinnott's signings would become key players for the club over the next few seasons.

=== Bradford Park Avenue ===
Sinnott was linked with a vacant position at newly-promoted Northern Premier League side Bradford Park Avenue at the end of 2008. The club were unwilling to pursue the interest because of Sinnott's unresolved contract with Port Vale, and instead appointed his former Farsley assistant and successor John Deacey. However, despite Sinnott still taking legal action against Port Vale, Park Avenue appointed Sinnott as their new manager just one month later; Avenue were 11th in the Northern Premier League Premier Division at the time of his appointment, with Deacey standing aside to become Sinnott's assistant once again. Sinnott's first game ended in a 2–0 defeat to Eastwood Town. By the end of the season Avenue were in seventh place, two points and two places outside the play-off zone. He admitted that "the quality of the UniBond Premier is higher than I remember it to be three or four years ago. You don't get any freebies, without a shadow of a doubt."

He left by mutual consent in October 2009, after a summer spending spree failed to produce results on the pitch for the 2009–10 season. Avenue recovered to finish the season in second place under Deacey, though lost to Boston United in the play-off final.

=== Altrincham ===
In May 2011, Sinnott was announced as the new manager of Altrincham, a club that had just been relegated from the Conference National into the Conference North. The club finished eighth in the Conference North in 2011–12, before securing a play-off position with a fourth-place finish in 2012–13. In the play-off semi-finals, they were beaten 4–2 by Brackley Town. The "Robins" again qualified for the play-offs in the 2013–14 campaign and went on to secure promotion with a 2–1 extra time victory over Guiseley in the play-off final. Altrincham finished 17th in the 2014–15 season, comfortably away from the relegation zone. He left Altrincham on 9 March 2016, following a run of seven league games without a victory that left the club 21st in the table, one point adrift of safety. His assistant, Neil Tolson, was appointed as his successor but could not save the club from relegation.

=== Gainsborough Trinity ===
On 13 February 2018, Sinnott was appointed as manager of Gainsborough Trinity, who were then just inside the National League North relegation zone. The "Holy Blues" ended the 2017–18 season in 20th position and were relegated to the Northern Premier League Premier Division. He remained at The Northolme for the start of the 2018–19 campaign but was sacked exactly one year into his appointment following a 5–0 defeat by league leaders Farsley Celtic which left Trinity four points outside the play-offs.

== Personal life ==
His son, Jordan, was also a professional footballer. Sinnott signed his son for Altrincham in February 2015, following a previous loan spell. Jordan died at the age of 25 after being attacked during a night out on 25 January 2020. Sinnott also has a younger son, Tom. Melanie Tait, the mother of his two children, was a police detective and died from cancer in November 2023.

== Career statistics ==
=== Playing statistics ===
Appearances and goals by club, season and competition
Club	Season	League			FA Cup		Other^{[A]}		Total	
Club	Season	Division	Apps	Goals	Apps	Goals	Apps	Goals	Apps	Goals
Walsall	1981–82	Third Division	4	0	0	0	0	0	4	0
Walsall	1982–83	Third Division	32	2	4	0	2	0	38	2
Walsall	1983–84	Third Division	4	0	0	0	1	0	5	0
Walsall	Total		40	2	4	0	3	0	47	2
Watford	1983–84	First Division	20	0	2	0	0	0	22	0
Watford	1984–85	First Division	30	0	5	0	4	0	39	0
Watford	1985–86	First Division	18	2	2	0	1	0	21	2
Watford	1986–87	First Division	10	0	2	0	1	0	13	0
Watford	Total		78	2	11	0	6	0	95	2
Bradford City	1987–88	Second Division	42	1	3	0	11	0	56	1
Bradford City	1988–89	Second Division	42	2	2	0	8	0	52	2
Bradford City	1989–90	Second Division	45	2	2	0	3	0	50	2
Bradford City	1990–91	Third Division	44	1	2	0	9	1	55	2
Bradford City	Total		173	6	9	0	31	1	213	7
Crystal Palace	1991–92	First Division	36	0	1	0	6	0	43	0
Crystal Palace	1992–93	Premier League	19	0	0	0	5	0	24	0
Crystal Palace	1993–94	First Division	0	0	0	0	1	0	1	0
Crystal Palace	Total		55	0	1	0	12	0	68	0
Bradford City	1993–94	Second Division	18	0	0	0	0	0	18	0
Bradford City	1994–95	Second Division	16	1	2	0	4	0	22	1
Bradford City	Total		34	1	2	0	4	0	40	1
Huddersfield Town	1994–95	Second Division	25	1	0	0	3	0	28	1
Huddersfield Town	1995–96	First Division	32	0	4	0	4	0	40	0
Huddersfield Town	1996–97	First Division	30	0	0	0	2	0	32	0
Huddersfield Town	Total		87	1	4	0	9	0	100	1
Oldham Athletic	1997–98	Second Division	13	0	0	0	1	0	14	0
Oldham Athletic	1998–99	Second Division	18	0	1	0	2	0	21	0
Oldham Athletic	Total		31	0	1	0	3	0	35	0
Bradford City (loan)	1997–98	First Division	7	0	0	0	0	0	7	0
Scarborough	1999–2000	Conference	22	0	0	0	2	0	24	0
Career total			527	12	32	0	70	1	629	13

A. The "Other" column constitutes appearances and goals in the League Cup, Football League Trophy, Football League play-offs and Full Members Cup.

=== Managerial statistics ===
As of 13 February 2019

Managerial record by team and tenure
Team	From	To	Record				
Team	From	To	G	W	D	L	Win %
Farsley Celtic	20 June 2003	5 November 2007	187	91	48	48	48.66
Port Vale	5 November 2007	22 September 2008	44	9	11	24	20.45
Bradford Park Avenue	17 January 2009	15 October 2009	33	15	10	8	45.45
Altrincham	25 May 2011	9 March 2016	232	102	49	81	43.97
Gainsborough Trinity	13 February 2018	13 February 2019	46	19	8	19	41.30
Total			542	236	126	180	43.54

== Honours ==
=== As a player ===
Watford

- FA Cup runner-up: 1983–84

Huddersfield Town

- Football League Second Division play-offs: 1995

Individual

- PFA Team of the Year: 1990–91 Third Division

=== As a Manager ===
Farsley Celtic

- Northern Premier League First Division third-place promotion: 2003–04
- Northern Premier League play-offs: 2005–06
- West Riding County Cup: 2006
- Conference North play-offs: 2007

Altrincham

- Conference North play-offs: 2014
