= Ronnie Jepson =

English footballer & manager (born 1963)

- Jepson as Gillingham's manager in 2006.

Personal information
- Full name: Ronald Francis Jepson
- Date of birth: 12 May 1963 (age 63)
- Place of birth: Audley, Staffordshire, England
- Height: 6 ft 0 in (1.83 m)
- Position: Striker

Senior career*
Years	Team	Apps	(Gls)
1989–1991	Port Vale	25	(0)
1990	→ Peterborough United (loan)	18	(5)
1991–1992	Preston North End	38	(8)
1992–1993	Exeter City	54	(21)
1993–1996	Huddersfield Town	107	(36)
1996–1998	Bury	47	(9)
1998	Oldham Athletic	9	(4)
1998–2000	Burnley	59	(3)
Total		357	(86)

Managerial career
- 2005–2007: Gillingham
- 2013: Bury
- * Club domestic league appearances and goals

Ronald Francis Jepson (born 12 May 1963) is an English football manager, coach and former player.

A striker, he scored 86 goals in 354 league games in an eleven-year professional career. He moved from Nantwich Town to Port Vale in 1989, turning professional at the age of 25. Loaned out to Peterborough United in 1990, he was sold to Preston North End for £80,000 in February 1991. He transferred to Exeter City a year later, before he moved on to Huddersfield Town in December 1993 for £70,000. He stayed with the "Terriers" for three years, helping the club to win promotion out of the Second Division in 1995. He moved to Bury for £40,000 in 1996 and helped the "Shakers" to the Second Division title in the 1996–97 campaign. He played for Oldham Athletic following a £40,000 move in January 1998, before arriving at his final club Burnley later in the year. He helped Burnley to win promotion out of the Second Division in 1999–2000 before he retired in 2000.

After a spell coaching at Burnley, he was appointed as Gillingham manager in November 2005. He was in charge for two years before tendering his resignation. He then returned to the back-room as a coach at Huddersfield Town, Crystal Palace, Queens Park Rangers, Leeds United, Bury, Cardiff City, Middlesbrough and Aberdeen. He took charge of Bury in October 2013 following a period as caretaker manager.

== Playing career ==
A relative latecomer to the professional game at 25, Jepson had first appeared for North West Counties League side Nantwich Town as a teenager in August 1982. He then signed for Congleton Town. He had stints at Alsager Town, Kidsgrove Athletic and Newcastle Town before re-joining Nantwich from Hanley Town in the 1988 close season. He made a big impact, becoming club captain and earning the NWCL Division Two Player of the Month award for January 1989. Jepson then started his league career under John Rudge at Port Vale in March 1989. The reason for this delay was that he had to spend four years fighting manslaughter charges in Belgium for his alleged involvement in the Heysel Stadium disaster; he was finally found not guilty when his trial concluded in April 1989. He worked as a coal miner for six years before becoming a professional footballer.

He appeared just twice for the "Valiants" in 1988–89 as they won promotion out of the Third Division, and was an unused substitute in the play-off final victory over Bristol Rovers. He then played eight Second Division games in 1989–90, and seeing as he was unable to nail down a first-team place at Vale Park he was loaned out to Peterborough United in January 1990 for a three-month spell. He played 18 Fourth Division games for Mark Lawrenson's "Posh", scoring five goals, as they missed out on the play-offs by just three points. Back in Burslem, he played 19 matches without scoring in 1990–91, before being sold to Preston North End for £80,000 in February 1991.

Les Chapman's "Lilywhites" finished 17th in the Third Division in 1990–91 and 1991–92. Jepson played 43 matches for the club in league and cup competitions, scoring 12 goals. He signed with Exeter City after Alan Ball paid out a £60,000 fee in July 1992. He helped the "Grecians" to maintain their third tier status in 1992–93; they finished three points ahead of his former club Preston North End, who occupied the final relegation place. They did drop into the basement division in 1993–94, but Jepson left St James Park before this eventuality. He played 67 games for Exeter, scoring 25 goals, including four in one match against Wrexham.

In December 1993, Huddersfield Town manager Neil Warnock paid Exeter £70,000 to secure Jepson's services. He formed a successful strike partnership with Andy Booth at Leeds Road. He scored five goals in 23 games throughout the remainder of the season, including a hat-trick past York City on 22 January. The pair helped the "Terriers" to gain promotion in 1994–95, beating Bristol Rovers 2–1 in the play-off final at Wembley, with Jepson crossing the ball to Booth for the opening goal of the game. He also scored twice in the final of the 1995 Yorkshire Electricity Cup, as Huddersfield beat Hull City 4–2. Throughout the season, he made 54 appearances, scoring 23 goals, whilst Booth hit 30 goals. Jepson was voted the club's Player of the Year for his efforts. He scored 14 goals in 48 appearances under new manager Brian Horton in 1995–96, after which Booth was sold to Sheffield Wednesday for £2.7 million. "Rocket Ronnie", as the Huddersfield fans called Jepson, also left the McAlpine Stadium, having played a total of 125 games for the club in all competitions, scoring 42 goals.

He signed with Bury on a £40,000 transfer in August 1996, as he helped Stan Ternent's "Shakers" to top the Second Division table in 1996–97, finishing ahead of Stockport County by a two-point margin; Jepson had scored nine goals in 36 appearances throughout the campaign. However, he hit the target just once in the first half of the 1997–98 campaign and was sold to Oldham Athletic for £40,000 in January 1998. He featured just nine times at Boundary Park, scoring four goals, before departing at the end of the season after Neil Warnock was replaced by Andy Ritchie.

He signed with Burnley in time for the start of the 1998–99 campaign, rejoining former manager Stan Ternent, and scored once in 17 appearances for "Clarets". He helped the club to win promotion into the First Division in 1999–2000, scoring twice in 36 appearances in both encounters with former club Bury, as Burnley finished second in the Second Division. He made 15 appearances in 2000–01, all as a substitute before an Achilles problem ended his playing days. He had made 68 appearances for the club over all competitions.

== Coaching and management career ==
Upon retiring as a player, Stan Ternent, who had signed Jepson at both Bury and Burnley, then appointed him to his first coaching role as reserve team coach at the "Clarets". In June 2002 he was linked to the vacant management position at Huddersfield Town, though Jepson opted to stay at Turf Moor.

In May 2004, the club did not renew Ternent's contract at Burnley, and Jepson was let go along with him. In December of the same year, Ternent became manager at Gillingham, and Jepson joined him, again as assistant manager. Although the "Gills" fortunes improved, they narrowly failed to escape relegation from the Championship. Ternent left the club during the summer, but Jepson remained as assistant to new manager Neale Cooper.

The 2005–06 season did not start well for Gillingham. Following a run of bad results and an FA Cup defeat to non-League Burscough, Cooper resigned. Jepson was appointed manager on 15 November 2005, initially on a caretaker basis. Still, he signed a two-year contract within the first two months, although this was not made public until several months later. Jepson turned the season around, and the "Gills", having flirted with relegation danger, finally finished in 14th place with 60 points. He was nominated for the League One Manager of the Month award in April. However, the award went to Bristol City manager Gary Johnson. During the close season Jepson's assistant Mick Docherty, who had been on a short-term contract, signed a new two-year contract for the role. Jepson was able to make long-term adjustments to the playing squad.

At the end of the 2006–07 season Jepson was once again linked with the newly vacant management position at Huddersfield, despite claiming to be happy at the Priestfield Stadium. Jepson was relieved to keep Gillingham in League One at the end of the season, however, following a poor start to the 2007–08 campaign, with five defeats from the first six matches, Jepson resigned as manager.

On 24 April 2008, it was confirmed that Jepson would return to Huddersfield Town. Previously, he had been approached to become the manager. However, this appointment saw him reunited with Stan Ternent, who was the newly appointed manager at the club, Jepson would once again become his assistant. The next month, the pair were joined by Mick Docherty, who joined as first-team coach, having previously worked with Jepson and Ternent at Burnley. After just six months at the club, all three men left the club in November 2008 after a difference of opinion with the board of directors.

Jepson spent a year out of football before joining his former manager at Huddersfield, Neil Warnock, then at Crystal Palace, as reserve team coach in July 2009. He spent a year there before moving to Queens Park Rangers to link up with Warnock once again as reserve team coach in July 2010. After Warnock was sacked by the club and appointed manager at Leeds United, Jepson followed him to Elland Road in February 2012, where he remained until Warnock's resignation in April 2013.

He was appointed as Kevin Blackwell's assistant manager at League Two side Bury in June 2013. Blackwell was sacked on 14 October, and Jepson was appointed as caretaker manager. It was later confirmed that he would remain as manager until at least January. However, the club announced David Flitcroft as their new manager on 9 December 2013, and Jepson was released from his contract.

He returned to the game in October 2016, when newly appointed Cardiff City manager Neil Warnock named Jepson his first-team coach. Warnock and his staff, including Jepson, were sacked in November 2019. He and Blackwell rejoined Warnock in his new role at Middlesbrough in June 2020. The trio were removed from their positions in November 2021.

On 13 February 2023, Jepson again followed Warnock as his assistant manager to Huddersfield Town, the club where Jepson had won promotion as a player under Warnock and also worked as Stan Ternent's assistant manager briefly in 2008. Warnock described Jepson as a "colossus" as the duo guided Huddersfield to safety at the end of the Championship season. Warnock and Jepson signed new one-year contracts in June 2023, only to depart three months later. In February 2024, Warnock was appointed interim manager of Aberdeen and again appointed Jepson as his assistant. Warnock and Jepson left the club the following month. When Warnock took over as caretaker manager of Torquay United in March 2026, Jepson joined him in the dugout as assistant. The pair lasted just 18 days in the job before a permanent manager was appointed.

== Personal life ==
His son, Oliver, also played non-League football.

== Career statistics ==
=== Playing statistics ===
Appearances and goals by club, season and competition
Club	Season	League			FA Cup		Other		Total	
Club	Season	Division	Apps	Goals	Apps	Goals	Apps	Goals	Apps	Goals
Port Vale	1988–89	Third Division	2	0	0	0	0	0	2	0
Port Vale	1989–90	Second Division	8	0	0	0	0	0	8	0
Port Vale	1990–91	Second Division	15	0	2	0	2	0	19	0
Port Vale	Total		25	0	2	0	2	0	29	0
Peterborough United (loan)	1989–90	Fourth Division	18	5	0	0	0	0	18	5
Preston North End	1990–91	Third Division	14	3	0	0	3	4	17	7
Preston North End	1991–92	Third Division	24	5	0	0	2	0	26	5
Preston North End	Total		38	8	0	0	5	4	43	12
Exeter City	1992–93	Second Division	38	8	1	0	6	1	45	9
Exeter City	1993–94	Second Division	16	13	2	1	4	2	22	16
Exeter City	Total		54	21	3	1	10	3	67	25
Huddersfield Town	1993–94	Second Division	23	5	0	0	0	0	23	5
Huddersfield Town	1994–95	Second Division	41	19	2	1	10	3	53	23
Huddersfield Town	1995–96	First Division	43	12	2	2	3	0	48	14
Huddersfield Town	Total		107	36	4	3	13	3	124	42
Bury	1996–97	Second Division	31	9	1	0	5	2	37	11
Bury	1997–98	First Division	16	0	2	0	4	1	22	1
Bury	Total		47	9	3	0	9	3	59	12
Oldham Athletic	1997–98	Second Division	9	4	0	0	0	0	9	4
Burnley	1998–99	Second Division	15	1	0	0	2	0	17	1
Burnley	1999–2000	Second Division	31	2	3	0	2	0	36	2
Burnley	2000–01	First Division	13	0	0	0	2	0	15	0
Burnley	Total		59	3	3	0	6	0	68	3
Career total			357	86	15	4	45	13	417	103

=== Managerial statistics ===
Managerial record by team and tenure
Team	From	To	Record				
Team	From	To	P	W	D	L	Win %
Gillingham	15 November 2005	9 September 2007	86	31	16	39	36.0
Bury	16 October 2013	9 December 2013	10	2	5	3	20.0
Total			96	33	21	42	34.4

== Honours ==
Port Vale

- Football League Third Division play-offs: 1989

Huddersfield Town

- Football League Second Division play-offs: 1995

Bury

- Football League Second Division: 1996–97

Burnley

- Football League Second Division second-place promotion: 1999–2000

Individual

- Huddersfield Town Player of the Year: 1994–95
