= 1983–84 Watford F.C. season =

English football team season

Watford
1983–84 season
- Chairman: Elton John
- Manager: Graham Taylor
- Stadium: Vicarage Road
- First Division: 11th
- FA Cup: Runners-up
- League Cup: Second round

The 1983–84 season was Watford's 103rd season in existence, and their second season in the First Division, following promotion in the 1981–82 season. Along with the First Division, in which Watford finished 11th, they competed in the FA Cup and Football League Cup. Watford were eliminated in the second round of the League Cup, the first round in which they took part, whilst they were runners-up in the FA Cup after losing 2–0 to Everton in the 1984 FA Cup final.

== Competitions ==
=== First Division ===
==== League table ====
Pos	Team	Pld	W	D	L	GF	GA	GD	Pts
9	West Ham United	42	17	9	16	60	55	+5	60
10	Aston Villa	42	17	9	16	59	61	−2	60
11	Watford	42	16	9	17	68	77	−9	57
12	Ipswich Town	42	15	8	19	55	57	−2	53
13	Sunderland	42	13	13	16	42	53	−11	52

Source: World Football
Rules for classification: 1) Points; 2) Goal difference; 3) Goals scored

==== Matches ====
First Division match results
Date	Opponent	Venue	Result F–A	Scorers	Attendance
27 August 1983	Coventry City	H	2-3	Barnes, Jobson	15,533
30 August 1983	Ipswich Town	H	2–2	Lohman, Callaghan	15,388
3 September 1983	Birmingham City	A	0–2		11,931
6 September 1983	Queens Park Rangers	A	1–1	Barnes	17,111
10 September 1983	Notts County	H	3–1	Reilly, Palmer, Barnes	12,763
17 September 1983	Stoke City	A	4–0	Lohman, Barnes (2), Jobson	12,691
24 September 1983	Tottenham Hotspur	H	2–3	Rostron, Callaghan (pen.)	21,056
1 October 1983	West Bromwich Albion	A	0–2		14,456
15 October 1983	Norwich City	H	1–3	Terry	12,745
22 October 1983	Everton	A	0–1		13,571
28 October 1983	West Ham United	H	0–0		14,559
5 November 1983	Leicester City	H	3–3	Callaghan, Richardson (2)	15,807
12 November 1983	Sunderland	A	0–3		15,407
19 November 1983	Manchester United	A	1–4	Callaghan	43,111
26 November 1983	Luton Town	H	1–2	Callaghan	17,791
3 December 1983	Wolverhampton Wanderers	A	5–0	Johnston (3), Reilly (2)	11,905
10 December 1983	Nottingham Forest	H	3–2	Johnston, Reilly, Callaghan	14,047
17 December 1983	Arsenal	A	1–3	Johnston	25,104
26 December 1983	Aston Villa	H	3–2	Gilligan (2), Barnes	18,226
27 December 1983	Southampton	A	0–1		20,659
31 December 1983	Birmingham City	H	1–0	Johnston	14,359
2 January 1984	Tottenham Hotspur	A	3–2	Johnston (2), Barnes	32,495
14 January 1984	Coventry City	A	2–1	Sherwood, Reilly	13,307
21 January 1984	Stoke City	H	2–0	Reilly, Johnston	14,076
1 February 1984	Liverpool	A	0–3		20,746
4 February 1984	West Bromwich Albion	H	3–1	Johnston, Gilligan (2)	14,240
11 February 1984	Notts County	A	5–3	Jackett, Callaghan (2), Reilly, Johnston	8,078
21 February 1984	West Ham United	A	4–2	Johnston, Barnes (2), Callaghan	19,241
25 February 1984	Everton	H	4–4	Barnes (2), Johnston, Rostron	16,982
3 March 1984	Leicester City	A	1–4	Rostron	13,295
17 March 1984	Queens Park Rangers	H	1–0	Rostron	18,645
20 March 1984	Sunderland	H	2–1	Johnston (2)	16,231
24 March 1984	Ipswich Town	A	0–0		14,956
31 March 1984	Liverpool	H	0–2		21,293
7 April 1984	Norwich City	A	1–6	Johnston	14,451
17 April 1984	Manchester United	H	0–0		20,764
21 April 1984	Aston Villa	A	1–2	Sterling	16,110
24 April 1984	Southampton	H	1–1	Johnston	16,744
28 April 1984	Luton Town	A	2–1	Callaghan, Johnston	12,594
5 May 1984	Wolverhampton Wanderers	H	0–0		13,534
7 May 1984	Nottingham Forest	A	1–5	Johnston	13,732
12 May 1984	Arsenal	H	2–1	Johnston, Reilly	22,007

=== FA Cup ===
FA Cup match results
Round	Date	Opponent	Venue	Result F–A	Scorers	Attendance
Third round	7 January 1984	Luton Town	A	2–2	Barnes, Johnston (pen.)	15,007
Third round replay	19 January 1984	Luton Town	H	4–2 (a.e.t.)	Callaghan, Reilly, Barnes, Johnston	20,586
Fourth round	28 January 1984	Charlton Athletic	A	2–0	Johnston, Reilly	22,392
Fifth round	18 February 1984	Brighton & Hove Albion	H	3–1	Reilly, Johnston, Jackett	28,000
Sixth round	10 March 1984	Birmingham City	A	3–1	Barnes (2), Taylor	40,220
Semi-final	14 April 1984	Plymouth Argyle	N	1–0	Reilly	43,858
Final	19 May 1984	Everton	N	0–2		100,000

=== League Cup ===
League Cup match results
Round	Date	Opponent	Venue	Result F–A	Scorers	Attendance
Second round, first leg	4 October 1983	Huddersfield Town	A	1–2	Barnes	10,631
Second round, second leg	25 October 1983	Huddersfield Town	H	2–2	Gilligan, Sims	13,006
