= Justin Channing =

English footballer

Personal information
- Full name: Justin Andrew Channing
- Date of birth: 19 November 1968 (age 57)
- Place of birth: Reading, England
- Height: 5 ft 11 in (1.80 m)
- Positions: Defender; midfielder

Youth career
- Queens Park Rangers

Senior career*
Years	Team	Apps	(Gls)
1986–1993	Queens Park Rangers	55	(5)
1993–1996	Bristol Rovers	130	(10)
1996–1998	Leyton Orient	74	(5)
- Slough Town

International career
1986	England Youth	2	(0)
- * Club domestic league appearances and goals

Justin Andrew Channing (born 19 November 1968) is an English former footballer who played as a defender or midfielder in the Football League for Queens Park Rangers, Bristol Rovers and Leyton Orient.

Channing signed professional forms with QPR in August 1986 and made his debut in November that year against Luton Town. He played 55 league games for QPR scoring 5 goals before transferring to Bristol Rovers in 1993 for a fee of £275,000, and later spent two seasons at Leyton Orient before moving into non-league football with Slough Town.
