= Paul Reid (footballer, born 1968) =

English footballer

Personal information
- Full name: Paul Robert Reid
- Date of birth: 19 January 1968 (age 58)
- Place of birth: Oldbury, England
- Height: 5 ft 8 in (1.73 m)
- Position: Midfielder

Youth career
- Leicester City

Senior career*
Years	Team	Apps	(Gls)
1986–1992	Leicester City	162	(21)
1992	→ Bradford City (loan)	7	(0)
1992–1994	Bradford City	82	(15)
1994–1997	Huddersfield Town	77	(6)
1997–1999	Oldham Athletic	93	(6)
1999–2002	Bury	110	(9)
2002–2003	Swansea City	20	(1)
2003–2004	Carmarthen Town	23	(1)
2004–2005	Afan Lido	20	(0)
Total		594	(59)

Managerial career
- 2007: Port Talbot Town (caretaker)
- 2012–2013: Afan Lido
- 2013-2019: Swansea City Academy
- 2019-2020: Forest Green Rovers Academy
- * Club domestic league appearances and goals

Paul Robert Reid (born 19 January 1968) is an English football coach and former professional player.

As a player his career as a midfielder saw him feature in the Football League for Leicester City, Bradford City, Huddersfield Town, Oldham Athletic, Bury and Swansea City.

== Playing career ==
Reid was first scouted at age 14 while playing for a local team in Birmingham. He was turned away from teams such as West Brom and Coventry as he was told he was "too small" to play as a centre forward.

He joined Leicester City as an apprentice at age 16 before signing his first professional contract at age 17 in 1986. In the 1987/88 season, he won the club's Goal of the Season for his goal against Blackburn.

In 1992 Reid joined Bradford City on loan before signing a 3-year permanent contract.

In 1994, Reid joined Huddersfield Town. The main major success of his career came in 1995 when he helped Huddersfield Town to gain promotion to the Division One via the Division Two play-offs. He started in the first leg of the semi-final but had to be substituted off at 20 minutes when he ruptured his knee ligaments after catching his studs on the ball. Reid had made 48 appearances for Huddersfield that season across all competitions, and scored 7 goals.

Reid next signed for Oldham Athletic in March 1997 before moving to Bury in 1999 on a free transfer.

Reid signed a one-year contract at Swansea City during the summer transfer window in 2002. His only goal for Swansea came on his debut against Rushden & Diamonds. He then played in the Welsh Premier League for Carmarthen Town and Afan Lido.

== Managerial career ==
After retiring as a player, Reid earned his coaching licence. He had a spell coaching Swansea City's junior teams before becoming coach of Welsh Premier club Port Talbot Town. After Tony Pennock's resignation in 2007 he acted as caretaker manager for two matches, both won, before staying on as coach under new manager Nicky Tucker. He left the club at the end of the 2007–08 season, but returned in December 2008 after yet another change of management.

In May 2012 he joined Afan Lido as a manager.

After a spell at Afan Lido, Paul joined the Swansea City academy where he stayed in the ranks until 2019. Paul then joined Forest Green Rovers Academy.
