= Terry Palmer (footballer) =

Irish footballer

Personal information
- Full name: Terence Palmer
- Date of birth: 26 November 1972 (age 53)
- Place of birth: Dublin, Ireland
- Position: Defender

Youth career
- Stella Maris

Senior career*
Years	Team	Apps	(Gls)
1991–1998	UCD AFC	155	(8)
1998–2004	Shamrock Rovers	204	(17)
2005	Bohemians	14	(0)
Total		373	(25)
- * Club domestic league appearances and goals

Terry Palmer (born 26 November 1972) is an Irish retired soccer player who played in the League of Ireland during the 1990s and 2000s.

== Career ==
He made his League of Ireland debut for UCD on 27 January 1991and played for the club for seven seasons. He scored a dream goal in the final of the Leinster Senior Cup (association football) in February 1995.

He then transferred to Shamrock Rovers in 1998. He was the clubs Player of the Year in the 1999–2000 season. He made a total of 4 appearances in Europe for the Hoops in the 2003 UEFA Intertoto Cup, before being released in 2004. For the 2000-01 League of Ireland and 2001-02 League of Ireland seasons Palmer was ever present.

He spent his final season in League of Ireland football at Bohemians making his debut at the Waterford Regional Sports Centre on 8 April. He retired at the end of the 2005 League of Ireland season.
