= Neil Warnock =

English football manager and former player (born 1948)

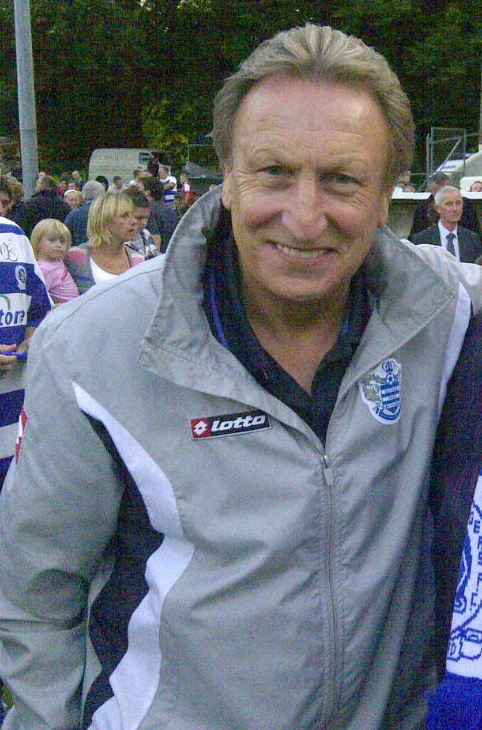
- Warnock during the pre-season training of Queens Park Rangers in 2011

Personal information
- Full name: Neil Warnock
- Date of birth: 1 December 1948 (age 77)
- Place of birth: Sheffield, West Riding of Yorkshire, England
- Height: 5 ft 9 in (1.75 m)
- Position: Winger

Team information
- Current team: Torquay United (football advisor)

Senior career*
Years	Team	Apps	(Gls)
1967–1969	Chesterfield	24	(2)
1969–1971	Rotherham United	52	(5)
1971–1973	Hartlepool	60	(5)
1973–1975	Scunthorpe United	72	(7)
1975–1976	Aldershot	37	(6)
1976–1978	Barnsley	57	(10)
1978	York City	4	(0)
1978–1979	Crewe Alexandra	21	(1)
1979	Burton Albion	9	(6)
1980–1981	Gainsborough Trinity		
1981–1982	Burton Albion	29	(3)
Total		327	(36)

Managerial career
- 1980–1981: Gainsborough Trinity
- 1981–1986: Burton Albion
- 1986–1989: Scarborough
- 1989–1993: Notts County
- 1993: Torquay United
- 1993–1995: Huddersfield Town
- 1995–1997: Plymouth Argyle
- 1997–1998: Oldham Athletic
- 1998–1999: Bury
- 1999–2007: Sheffield United
- 2007–2010: Crystal Palace
- 2010–2012: Queens Park Rangers
- 2012–2013: Leeds United
- 2014: Crystal Palace
- 2015: Queens Park Rangers (caretaker)
- 2016: Rotherham United
- 2016–2019: Cardiff City
- 2020–2021: Middlesbrough
- 2023: Huddersfield Town
- 2024: Aberdeen
- 2026: Torquay United (caretaker)
- * Club domestic league appearances and goals

Neil Warnock (born 1 December 1948) is an English football manager and former player who is currently football advisor of National League South club Torquay United. In a managerial career spanning five decades, Warnock has managed sixteen different clubs from the Premier League to non-league. Within English football, he holds the record for the most promotions, with eight, and the most games as a professional manager, with 1,626, beating the previous record of 1,601 set by Dario Gradi.

Warnock played as a winger for Chesterfield, Rotherham United, Hartlepool, Scunthorpe United, Aldershot, Barnsley, York City and Crewe Alexandra, scoring 36 goals in 327 career league appearances. He retired from league football in 1979, aged 30. His playing career continued in the 1979–80 season with non-league Burton Albion making nine appearances and scoring six goals until an injury cut his season short. He finished his playing career when returning to Burton Albion as player manager in the 1981–82 season, playing in 29 games and scoring three goals, before concentrating on management for the rest of his time at Burton.

Warnock's first managerial job was with non-League Gainsborough Trinity, he would subsequently manage Burton Albion and Scarborough, winning promotion to the Football League with the latter in 1987. He then managed Notts County, leading them from the Third Division to the First Division in successive seasons, though he was dismissed after the club were relegated in 1992. After a brief spell at Torquay United, he moved to Huddersfield Town, with whom he won promotion to the new First Division. He then resigned and joined Plymouth Argyle, leading them to the Second Division. After being dismissed, he spent spells with Oldham Athletic and Bury.

In 1999, Warnock joined boyhood club Sheffield United, leading them to the semi-finals of the League Cup and FA Cup in 2003 and promotion to the Premier League in 2006. However, he resigned in 2007 after the club were relegated. He then took over at Crystal Palace, saving the club from relegation to League One. When the club went into administration, he left to join Queens Park Rangers, winning promotion to the Premier League with the club in 2011. He was dismissed with the club in a precarious position and having spent short spells at Leeds United, Crystal Palace, Queens Park Rangers, and Rotherham United, he led Cardiff City to the Premier League in 2018. After a short spell with Middlesbrough, Warnock announced his retirement from management in April 2022. He returned to guide Huddersfield Town to Championship safety in February 2023, was interim manager of Aberdeen in the Scottish Premiership in 2024, and was caretaker manager of Torquay United in March 2026.

== Playing career ==
Warnock started his professional playing career with Chesterfield in 1967, before moving on to Rotherham United, Hartlepool, Scunthorpe United, Aldershot, Barnsley, York City and Crewe Alexandra, making a total of 327 league appearances in an 11-year playing career. At Hartlepool, he won the club's Player of the Season award in 1972. Whilst at Hartlepool, at the age of 24, Warnock was inspired to enter football management following his playing days, after a dressing down from manager Len Ashurst after an FA Cup defeat to Boston United. He finished his Football League career at Crewe Alexandra in 1979, aged only 30. His playing career continued at Burton Albion in 1979 which was cut short with an injury and continued when he re-joined Burton as player-manager in 1981–1982, before concentrating on management for the rest of his time at Burton.

== Managerial career ==
=== Early spells ===
After being involved in Sunday League coaching, his first full managerial job was with Northern Premier League side Gainsborough Trinity in 1980. During his time at Gainsborough, Warnock also played for the club. Warnock's Gainsborough side went unbeaten for the first home 13 games of the 1980–81 Northern Premier League season, a streak that was not equalled by the club until 2022. Under Warnock's management, Gainsborough finished fifth in the Northern Premier League.

Following this he managed Burton Albion and Scarborough. At Scarborough he and Paul Evans, his assistant, won the Football Conference title in 1987, making them the first team to win automatic promotion to the Football League following the abolition of the re-election system.

Warnock had earlier spent time as a coach at Peterborough United, where he met Posh assistant boss Mick Jones. In late 1988, Warnock became manager of Notts County – then in the Third Division – with Jones as his assistant. Also joining the backroom staff were Warnock's assistant at Scarborough, Paul Evans, and ex-Scarborough physio Dave Wilson. The four helped County achieve successive promotions to reach the First Division for the 1991–92 season, with Warnock turning down lucrative offers to manage Chelsea and Sunderland during this time. Warnock, however, was dismissed in January 1993 after County's relegation had cost them a place in the new Premier League.

On 1 February 1993, Warnock arrived at Torquay United as "consultant", where he was brought in to assist the team manager, Paul Compton. On 24 March 1993, Warnock officially took over as manager following the resignation of Compton, who reverted to his previous role of youth coach.

After saving the club from relegation from the Football League, Warnock left the club in May 1993 and was replaced by Don O'Riordan. Soon afterwards Warnock turned down the job at Lincoln City.

=== Huddersfield Town ===
Warnock resumed his partnership with Jones, Evans and Wilson at Huddersfield Town, his appointment coming in July 1993 where he replaced Ian Ross, who had departed Leeds Road one day previously. His arrival at the club coincided with Huddersfield's final season at Leeds Road, which had been their home since their formation in 1908.

Warnock quickly injected new blood into the side, signing goalkeeper Steve Francis, Darren Bullock, Ronnie Jepson, Tom Cowan and Pat Scully during his first season, all of whom would go on to become mainstays in the 1994–95 promotion season. He also showed faith in Centre of Excellence products such as Chris Billy, Simon Baldry and Andy Booth – a player then struggling to make the breakthrough who would go on to become a club legend in modern times.

Despite these acquisitions, Town struggled for most of the 1993–94 season and Warnock was quick to offload fan favourites Iwan Roberts, Iffy Onoura and Chris Marsden while introducing a more direct style of play. He was deeply unpopular during those early months of his reign and it wasn't until the run to the 1994 Football League Trophy Final (lost on penalties to Swansea City) that opinions began to change. This run coincided with an upturn in league form and a mass optimism further bolstered by the move to the new Alfred McAlpine Stadium for the 1994–95 season.

Warnock's side won the Yorkshire Electricity Cup in late 1994 and were genuine contenders for automatic promotion until falling away in the final few games to finish 5th (the final play-off spot that season owing to league re-structuring). They triumphed on penalties over second-placed Brentford after two thrilling ties and went on to beat Bristol Rovers at Wembley Stadium. He quit Huddersfield just days after their promotion, but made a swift and surprising return to management at Plymouth Argyle, who had just been relegated to Division Three.

=== Plymouth Argyle ===
In his first season as manager of Plymouth Argyle, Warnock took the club to Division Three play-off glory after finishing fourth in the league. The play-off semi-final was a memorable affair – Argyle played Colchester United and were 1–0 down from the first leg, but won 3–1 at Home Park in the second leg. During this game, Warnock was sent off from the dug-out. Warnock responded to this by jumping into the crowd to watch the remainder of the match with the Argyle supporters.

The final was the first match that the club had played at Wembley. A header from Ronnie Mauge on 65 minutes gave Argyle a 1–0 win over Darlington and promotion to Division Two. In February 1997, Warnock was surprisingly sacked as Argyle manager despite his popularity with the supporters.

=== Oldham Athletic ===
On 21 February 1997 Warnock joined Oldham Athletic, replacing Graeme Sharp, with the club sitting bottom of Division One. Despite notable wins against QPR, Wolves and Swindon he was unable to help the club avoid relegation to the third tier for the first time in 23 years. The following season started well with the club spending most of the time in the top 6 until early March and unbeaten at home until February, however due to strict cost-cutting measures and a lack of financial backing from the board he was forced to sell top scorer Stuart Barlow and fellow forward Sean McCarthy and the club finished the season in 13th. Warnock left the club by mutual consent at the seasons conclusion.

He then took over the following season at Bury and taking several players from Latics with him..

=== Sheffield United ===
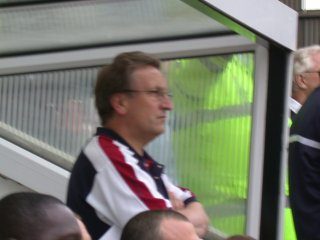
Warnock coaching Sheffield United in 2003

Warnock was appointed as manager of his boyhood club Sheffield United on 2 December 1999. In 2002–03, Warnock led Sheffield United to the semi-finals of the League Cup and FA Cup, only to lose to Liverpool and Arsenal respectively, as well as the First Division play-off final, with the Blades beaten 3–0 by Wolverhampton Wanderers. This was the first time in his management career that he had lost a play-off contest, as he had achieved four promotions via the playoffs in the 1990s.

In 2005, Jones resumed the partnership by taking up the assistant's post at Bramall Lane, and at the end of the 2005–06 season, the club were promoted to the Premier League as runners-up in The Championship.

The Blades performed well in their expected relegation battle, and for a long time looked to be heading for survival. However, a turning point in the season occurred with victories for both West Ham United against Manchester United and Wigan Athletic on the final day of the season, condemning Warnock's side to relegation. Warnock wrote in his autobiography that minutes after the final game of the season, actor and Blades fan Sean Bean burst into his office, blaming Warnock for the team's relegation in a "foul-mouthed tirade" while Warnock's wife and daughter were present. Bean denied this, calling Warnock "bitter" and "hypocritical", and arguing that he would never use such language in front of another man's wife and children. Warnock resigned from the club following relegation to take some time out of football.

A major factor that caused Sheffield United's relegation was that West Ham beat Manchester United on the final day of the season 1–0, with the goal scored by Carlos Tevez, whose contract was in question over third party ownership and who then signed for the champions the very next season. While all of this was happening, the Blades played Wigan at Bramall Lane and needed only one point to stay up; however, with the score at 1–1, a penalty was awarded to Wigan in injury time at the end of the first half – David Unsworth converted. The scoreline remained the same till the final whistle, sending the Blades back to the Championship after only one season.

=== Crystal Palace ===
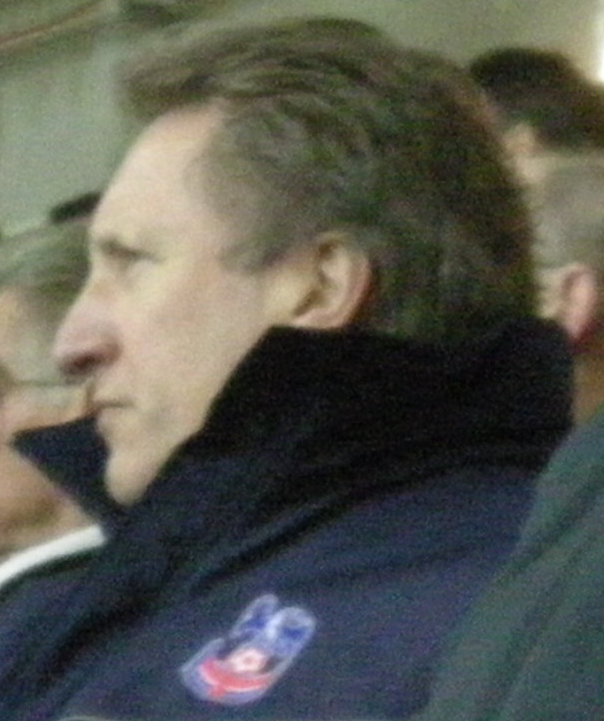
Warnock with Palace

Warnock spoke to Milan Mandarić about the vacant managerial role at Leicester City in the summer, but was never handed the job. Simon Jordan spoke to Warnock about taking over at Crystal Palace following the sacking of Peter Taylor and, after initially not being keen on the job, he returned to football management with Palace on 11 October 2007. Mick Jones returned from his own sabbatical to join Warnock's team as assistant. Under Warnock and Jones, Palace made a massive turn-around, moving from relegation battlers to promotion contenders in the space of six months, with Warnock's use of youngsters a major factor in the improved performances and results. Palace made the play-offs in the end, but were beaten at the semi-final stage by Bristol City, who went on to lose to Hull City in the final.

Warnock stayed on for the 2008–09 season, but on taking the job a year earlier he had made it clear that the Crystal Palace job would be his last managerial role in football, with the club's finances beginning to take a turn for the worse. The 2009–10 season saw Palace perform well despite being heavily restricted by the club's poor financial position, which resulted in the club being placed in administration late in January. A ten-point deduction was imposed by the Football League for this. Crystal Palace's administrator commented that Warnock was "let go" after telling the administrator he did not have the stomach for the fight to save the club.

=== Queens Park Rangers ===
On 1 March 2010, Warnock joined Queens Park Rangers as manager on a three-and-a-half-year deal after agreeing compensation with Crystal Palace. His first match in charge was an emphatic 3–1 home win against West Bromwich Albion.

He helped QPR comfortably avoid relegation in 2009–10 – including a 2–0 win against former club Crystal Palace at Selhurst Park. Warnock was awarded Manager of the Month for August 2010. Using a new 4–2–3–1 formation built around playmaker Adel Taarabt (who went on to win the Football League Championship Player of the Year 2011), QPR topped the table for the majority of the 2010–11 season and on 30 April 2011 were promoted as Championship champions after a 2–0 win over Watford.

Despite leading the club to the Premier League for the first time in 15 years, he was sacked on 8 January 2012 after the 1–2 home defeat to Norwich City on 2 January 2012. The owner of QPR, Tony Fernandes, said that the club slipped down to a dangerous league position (17th) after recent results. Warnock said, "Obviously I'm very disappointed but, having achieved so much, I leave the club with a great sense of pride. I have enjoyed my time here more than anywhere else and the QPR fans have been brilliant with me – they deserve success. My biggest regret is that the takeover didn't happen earlier, because that would have given me the opportunity to bring in the targets I'd pinpointed all last summer and probably given us a better chance to succeed in the Premier League. The board at QPR are hugely ambitious and I wish them every success for the future. I've been involved in the game a long time and I will be spending the immediate future with my family and friends before deciding my next career move."

=== Leeds United ===
On 18 February 2012, Warnock joined Leeds as manager on a one-and-a-half-year deal taking him up to the end of the 2012–13 season. Before officially taking charge from caretaker manager Neil Redfearn he oversaw Leeds win 3–2 against Doncaster Rovers from the stands on 18 February with Warnock revealing he spoke to the players before the game and at half-time. On 28 February 2012, Warnock made his first signing as Leeds manager by bringing in Danny Webber, whom he managed while at Sheffield United.

Leeds would go on to finish 14th in the Championship, and during the summer of 2012, Warnock revamped the entire Leeds team with several new signings. Warnock started the 2012–13 season with a home win in the League Cup beating Shrewsbury Town 4–0. Leeds would then go on to beat Wolves 1–0 at Elland Road on the opening day of the Championship.

After a string of defeats and Leeds sitting five points off the relegation zone, Warnock parted company with the club on 1 April 2013.

=== Return to Crystal Palace ===
On 27 August 2014, it was announced that Warnock would be appointed for a second spell in charge at Crystal Palace following the departure of Tony Pulis. However, after a poor run of form, and Crystal Palace ending up in the bottom three, Warnock was sacked by the club on 27 December 2014. He was succeeded by Alan Pardew on 2 January 2015.

In 2015, Warnock returned to Queens Park Rangers as first team advisor. On 4 November, he was placed in temporary charge of QPR following the departure of Chris Ramsey from the club.

=== Rotherham United ===
On 11 February 2016, Neil Warnock was confirmed as the new Rotherham United manager for the remainder of the 2015–16 season, replacing Neil Redfearn. Warnock drew his first game in charge with a 0–0 draw against Birmingham City in a match which saw both Richard Wood and Joe Mattock sent off. He then lost his next two games, against Reading and Burnley, 2–0. Rotherham then went on an unbeaten run of 11 matches, including wins against Brentford (2–1), Sheffield Wednesday (1–0), Middlesbrough (1–0), drawing against Derby County 3–3 after being 3–0 down with eight minutes to go, and winning 1–0 at Portman Road against Ipswich Town. Warnock was awarded the Championship Manager of the Month for March. The final win of the run was at Milton Keynes Dons, where a 4–0 thrashing all but sealed Rotherham's survival in the Championship at the expense of their opponents. The season closed with Warnock stating he wanted one last season managing in the Championship and Rotherham hoping to secure his services for 2016–17.

Despite not staying on as Rotherham manager beyond the end of the season, Warnock later said that keeping Rotherham in the division was the biggest achievement in his managerial career.

=== Cardiff City ===
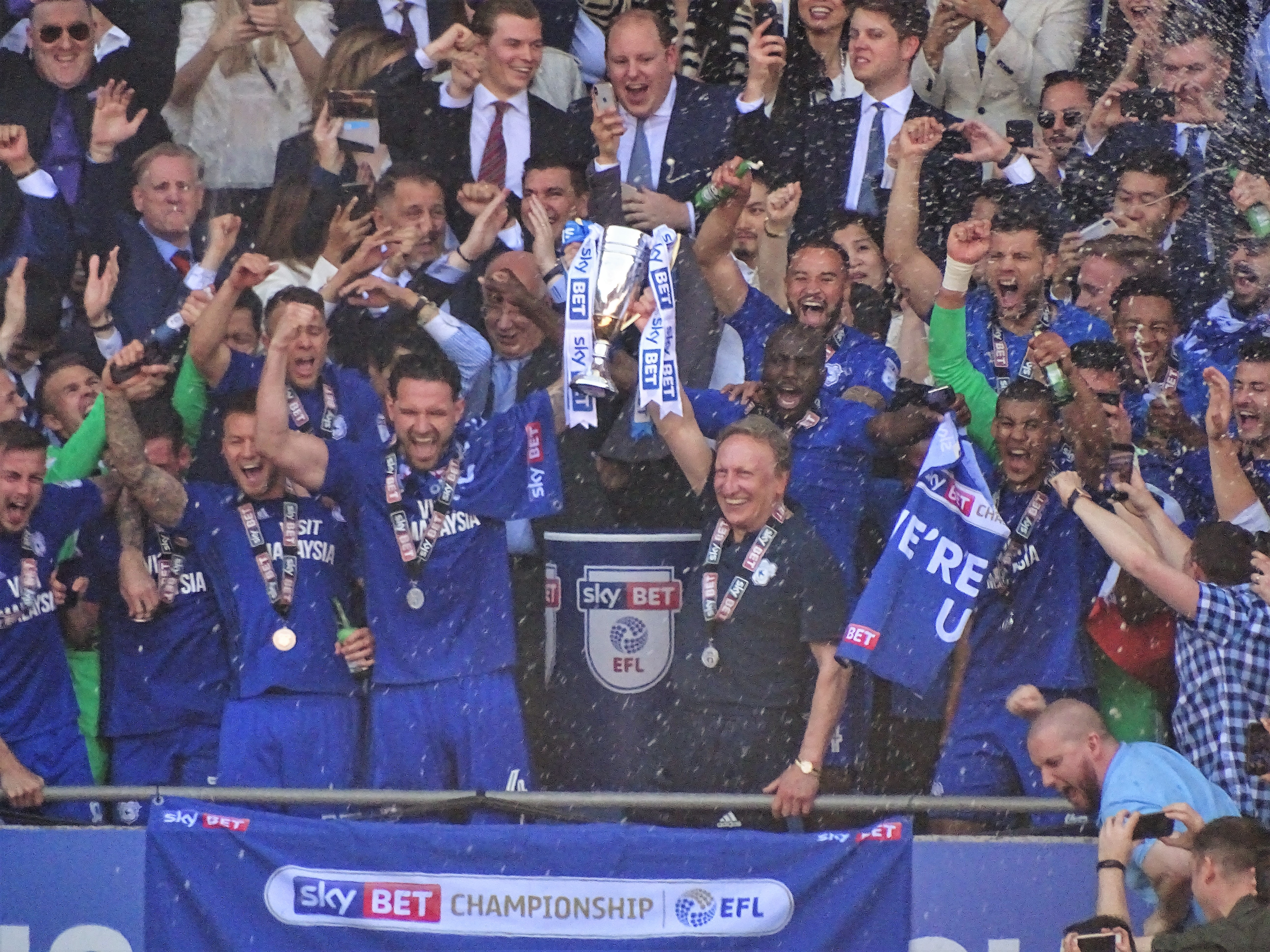
Warnock (holding trophy right) lifts the 2017–18 EFL Championship runner-up trophy with Sean Morrison

On 5 October 2016, Warnock was appointed first team manager of Cardiff City. They finished in 12th place in the Championship in Warnock's first season in charge. On 6 May 2018, Warnock guided Cardiff to promotion to the Premier League after a 0–0 draw against Reading. With this promotion Warnock became the first manager to win eight promotions in the professional leagues.

In January 2019, Warnock said that he considered retirement following the disappearance and eventual death of Emiliano Sala, who he had signed for a club record £15m from FC Nantes that month. However, he was unable to keep the team up and Cardiff were relegated back to the Championship at the end of the season. Warnock left Cardiff on 11 November after just over three years as manager; his final match was a home loss to Bristol City. He described his time at Cardiff as some of the best days in his career.

=== Middlesbrough ===
On 23 June 2020, Warnock was appointed manager of Championship club Middlesbrough, with the club only outside the Championship relegation zone on goal difference after 38 games. He replaced Jonathan Woodgate who was sacked from his first job in management after less than a year in charge. In his first game in charge, on 27 June, Middlesbrough beat Stoke City 2–0 to climb to 19th in the league. Having been 21st in the table when Warnock took over, they finished 17th in the league. Although initially on a short-term contract, Warnock confirmed that he would continue as manager for the 2020–21 season. On 17 September 2020, Middlesbrough confirmed he had tested positive for COVID-19.

On 30 October 2021, he equalled Dario Gradi's record for the most games managed in English professional football at 1,601 with a 2–0 loss to Birmingham City. Three days later he broke the record in the next match, a 3–1 loss away to Luton Town. On 6 November 2021, Warnock left Middlesbrough by mutual consent with the club having already identified his replacement. His assistants Kevin Blackwell and Ronnie Jepson also left the club.

On 9 April 2022, Warnock announced his retirement from management after 42 years in the dugout.

=== Return to Huddersfield Town ===
Ten months later, 74-year-old Warnock came out of retirement on 13 February 2023 after he was appointed manager of Huddersfield Town until the end of the 2022–23 season, returning as manager of the club almost 30 years after his initial appointment.

He officially took charge of the club three days later, cutting short a holiday in the USA to return to management, when he replaced the previous head coach Mark Fotheringham. He joined the club with 15 games remaining of the 2022-23 season. His first game in charge was a 2–1 win over Birmingham City. On 4 May, Warnock guided Huddersfield to another season in the Championship by beating Sheffield United 1–0, despite having been seven points adrift of safety in March.

On 14 June 2023, Warnock signed a new one-year contract extension with the club. On 18 September 2023, the club confirmed in a statement that the home fixture with Stoke City two days later would be his final match in charge of the club. The change came after just eight matches. Huddersfield played out a 2–2 draw with Stoke City on 20 September with fans staying behind to applaud Warnock on his final game as manager.

=== Aberdeen ===
On 5 February 2024, it was announced that Warnock would take charge of Scottish Premiership club Aberdeen until the end of the 2023–24 season, replacing manager Barry Robson. His first game in charge of Aberdeen, on 6 February resulted in a 2–1 defeat by Rangers away at Ibrox Stadium. His first home game as Aberdeen manager was on 10 February against Bonnyrigg Rose with Aberdeen winning 2–0 in the fifth round of the Scottish Cup. Warnock left Aberdeen on 9 March, following a 3–1 win against Kilmarnock in the quarter-final of the Scottish Cup. Those two cup ties were his only victories in eight matches as Aberdeen manager. Following Warnock's departure, Aberdeen chairman Dave Cormack said that the club were at an "advanced stage" of finding a longer-term appointment.

=== Return to Torquay United ===
On 14 May 2024, Warnock was appointed football advisor of National League South club Torquay United, assisting the new board following the takeover by the Bryn Consortium. On 1 March 2026, following the sacking of Paul Wotton, Warnock was named as Torquay caretaker manager.

== Personal life ==
Warnock was born in Sheffield, West Riding of Yorkshire (now South Yorkshire). He has been a lifelong supporter of Sheffield United. He is married to Sharon and has four children, James, Natalie, Amy and William. In 2010 he lived in Richmond, London, and as of April 2020 he had a home near Stoke Climsland, Cornwall, and another in Dunoon, Argyll and Bute.

Warnock is a qualified chiropodist.

Warnock was in favour of Britain leaving the European Union. In a press conference after a Cardiff City game in January 2019, he remarked that: "I can't wait to get out of it, if I'm honest. I think we'll be far better out of the bloody thing. In every aspect. Football-wise as well, absolutely. To hell with the rest of the world."

Warnock is portrayed by Antony Byrne in the 2022 television film Floodlights, centred on Bury defender Andy Woodward.

== Honours ==
=== As a player ===
Individual

- Hartlepool Player of the Year: 1971–72

=== As a manager ===
Burton Albion

- NPL Challenge Cup: 1984–85

Scarborough

- Football Conference: 1986–87

Notts County

- Football League Second Division play-offs: 1991
- Football League Third Division play-offs: 1990

Huddersfield Town

- Football League Second Division play-offs: 1995
- Yorkshire Electricity Cup: 1994
- Football League Trophy runner-up: 1993–94

Plymouth Argyle

- Football League Third Division play-offs: 1996

Sheffield United

- Football League Championship second-place promotion: 2005–06

Queens Park Rangers

- Football League Championship: 2010–11

Cardiff City

- EFL Championship second-place promotion: 2017–18

Individual

- Football Conference Manager of the Month: November 1986, December 1986
- Football Conference Manager of the Year: 1986–87
- Football League / EFL Championship Manager of the Month: December 2004, August 2005, September 2005, December 2008, August 2010, September 2010, March 2016, August 2017, February 2018, March 2018, October 2020
- BBC London Sports Personality of the Year: 2011
- LMA Special Achievement Award: 2017–18

== Managerial statistics ==
As of match played 14 March 2026

Managerial record by team and tenure
Team	From	To	Record				
Team	From	To	P	W	D	L	Win %
Gainsborough Trinity	1 July 1980	18 February 1981	39	18	12	9	46.15
Burton Albion	18 February 1981	7 March 1986	303	140	70	93	46.20
Scarborough	1 August 1986	1 January 1989	121	57	35	29	47.11
Notts County	5 January 1989	14 January 1993	221	94	54	73	42.53
Torquay United	24 March 1993	13 May 1993	9	3	4	2	33.33
Huddersfield Town	15 July 1993	5 June 1995	120	51	37	32	42.50
Plymouth Argyle	22 June 1995	3 February 1997	92	37	24	31	40.22
Oldham Athletic	21 February 1997	7 May 1998	69	22	20	27	31.88
Bury	2 June 1998	2 December 1999	77	19	29	29	24.68
Sheffield United	2 December 1999	16 May 2007	385	165	98	122	42.86
Crystal Palace	11 October 2007	2 March 2010	129	47	39	43	36.43
Queens Park Rangers	2 March 2010	8 January 2012	84	33	27	24	39.29
Leeds United	20 February 2012	1 April 2013	63	23	15	25	36.51
Crystal Palace	27 August 2014	27 December 2014	17	3	6	8	17.65
Queens Park Rangers (caretaker)	4 November 2015	4 December 2015	4	2	1	1	50.00
Rotherham United	11 February 2016	1 June 2016	16	6	6	4	37.50
Cardiff City	5 October 2016	11 November 2019	144	59	29	56	40.97
Middlesbrough	23 June 2020	7 November 2021	75	29	14	32	38.67
Huddersfield Town	16 February 2023 (Note: On 13 February, Huddersfield Town announced that Warnock had agreed to return as manager starting on 16 February. Soccerbase uses the date of announcement as his start date, so erroneously attributes the match played on 15 February (a loss) to Warnock rather than to caretaker Narcís Pèlach.)	20 September 2023	23	9	6	8	39.13
Aberdeen	5 February 2024	9 March 2024	8	2	2	4	25.00
Torquay United (caretaker)	2 March 2026	18 March 2026	4	2	1	1	50.00
Total			2,003	821	529	653	40.99

== See also ==
- List of football managers with the most matches
