= Pat Scully =

Irish footballer & manager (born 1970)

Patrick Scully
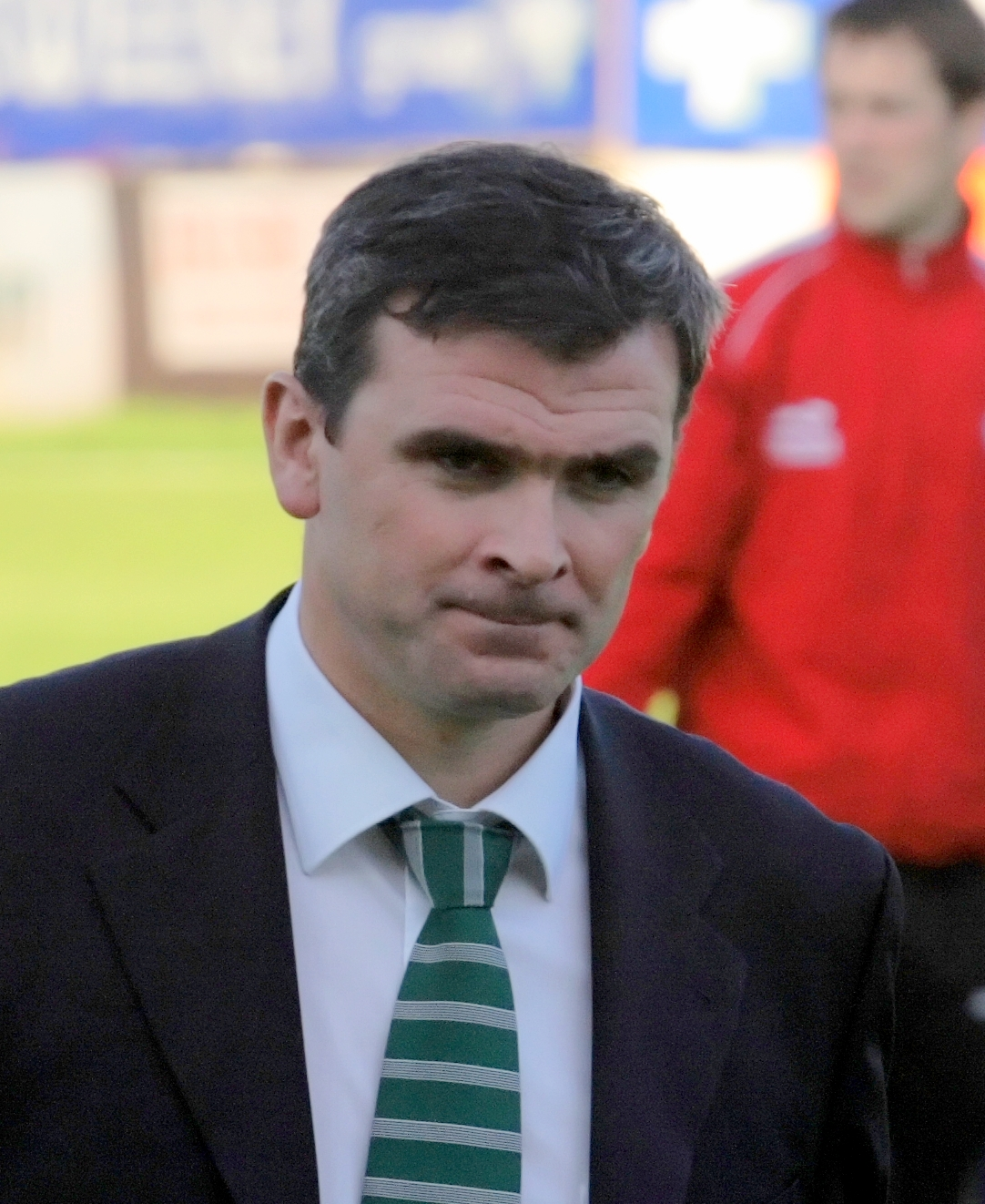

Personal information
- Full name: Patrick Joseph Scully
- Date of birth: 23 June 1970 (age 56)
- Place of birth: Dublin, Ireland
- Height: 1.85 m (6 ft 1 in)
- Position: Defender

Youth career
- 1987–1991: Arsenal
- Lourdes Celtic

Senior career*
Years	Team	Apps	(Gls)
1987–1991	Arsenal	0	(0)
1989	→ Preston North End (loan)	13	(0)
1990	→ Northampton Town (loan)	15	(0)
1991–1994	Southend United	114	(1)
1994–1996	Huddersfield Town	74	(2)
1996–2001	Shelbourne	148	(26)
2001–2002	Shamrock Rovers	41	(2)
2003	Drogheda United	23	(0)
Total		148	(31)

International career
1988	Republic of Ireland	1	(0)
1990–1992	Republic of Ireland U23	1	(0)
1990	Republic of Ireland B	2	(0)
1989–1991	Republic of Ireland U21	9	(0)

Managerial career
- 2005: Kilkenny City
- 2006–2008: Shamrock Rovers
- 2009–2012: Limerick
- * Club domestic league appearances and goals

Patrick Joseph Scully (born 23 June 1970) is an Irish football manager and former player.

An accomplished central defender during his playing days, Scully started his career in England, gaining one international cap, two B caps, one U23 cap and nine U21 caps for the Republic of Ireland during this spell before returning to Ireland.

== Playing career ==
Scully was born in Dublin. As a player, he started his career at Arsenal, where he was part of the youth team that won the 1988 FA Youth Cup. However, after loan spells at Preston North End and Northampton Town, he signed for Southend United in January 1991 having not made a single appearance for Arsenal's first team. He did however earn a senior cap for the Republic of Ireland whilst at Arsenal in a friendly against Tunisia in 1988.

Scully was a regular at Southend for three years playing for a time with Stan Collymore, before moving to Huddersfield Town in March 1994. A month after joining he was a member of the Huddersfield side beaten in a penalty shoot-out in the final of the Football League Trophy at Wembley Stadium. He went on to become a key figure at the heart of defence in Neil Warnock's side and helped the Terriers to promotion in the 1994–95 season.

In 1996 he moved back to Ireland to join Shelbourne. Under his captaincy, as well as his defensive abilities, Scully was a constant threat from set pieces and would often score crucial goals for Shelbourne.

Scoring 11 league goals the following season he was the Player of the Month in September 1997 and ended the season as the PFAI Player of the Year in 1997–98.

He signed for Shamrock Rovers in June 2001. He made his debut at Bray on 12 August and scored his first goal against Dundalk on 18 January 2002. Scully captained Rovers during that season, when the club played in Richmond Park. He formed a partnership in defence with Terry Palmer, the Rovers central defender who would later captain the club. Scully led Rovers to the FAI Cup final that season, although he could not prevent Derry City winning the competition with a 1–0 win.

He was then placed on the transfer list after a difference of opinion with manager Liam Buckley. His last game was in Longford on 23 November.

He made two appearances in European competition for the Hoops.

After two goals in 55 total appearances Scully moved to Drogheda United. He made his debut against Rovers on 11 April 2003 and played for one season before retiring.

He was Player of the Year at Southend, Huddersfield and at Shelbourne. Pat Scully has now moved into driving taxi cabs around Dublin town since hanging up his managerial boots.

His brother Mick also played in the League of Ireland

== Managerial career ==
He was eager to stay in the game, however, and was offered a chance by Kilkenny City to begin his managerial career. Scully took control of the unfashionable First Division club before the 2005 season.

Although the season did not begin well for Scully and Kilkenny, the side performed excellently during the second half of the season, eventually just missing out on a place in the promotion play-off.

Scully's performance as manager of Kilkenny attracted the interest of Shamrock Rovers, who had undergone massive internal restructuring since Scully's playing days. Gone were the old board of directors, to be replaced by the 400 Club, a supporter's consortium who had saved the club from going under.

The 400 Club sacked Rovers manager Roddy Collins at the end of the 2005 season, which ended with the club being relegated for the first time in their history. Shortly after sacking Collins, Rovers approached Scully and asked him to take over the club.

Scully was installed as Rovers manager and immediately began reshaping the playing squad. He brought several players with him from Kilkenny, with many others signing from Kildare County and other First Division clubs.

The new-look Shamrock Rovers began their first ever season in the First Division with a late 2–1 win over Dundalk, and from there never looked back. The club eventually won the First Division title on the last day of the season, with a 1–1 away draw to Cobh Ramblers.

Scully earned himself a reputation as the best up-and-coming manager in Ireland by winning the First Division Trophy at his first attempt. Rovers finished the 2007 season in 5th position. Unfortunately the young team faded badly in the final stretch and European football was missed out on but despite this it was a good overall season with many positives.

His contract with Shamrock Rovers was terminated by mutual consent on 14 October 2008. The clubtext quoted "Shamrock Rovers and Pat Scully have mutually agreed to part company with immediate effect. The club is thankful to Pat for what he achieved and wish him well."

On 25 March 2009, League of Ireland first division side Limerick F.C. announced that Scully was to take over the vacant managerial role on Shannonside. Scully said: "Having met the board, I was very impressed with their plans for the future of Limerick FC and I look forward to playing my part as manager in the future success of the club."

In September 2011 his contract was extended by two years. In October 2012, Scully won his second League of Ireland First Division title.

In November 2012, Scully was sacked by Limerick.

== Controversy ==
While appearing as an analyst on TV3's Eircom League Weekly show in August 2006, Scully observed that the league's rulebook needed to be tightened up in order to stop football matters ending up before the courts. The FAI did not take kindly to this criticism and fined Scully €5,000, suspending all but €2,000. Scully briefly threatened to walk away from football, but this was averted when the Rovers board of directors offered to pay the fine on his behalf.

Fallings out with some Rovers players led to a cull of the squad mid-way through the 2006 season.

The 2008 season also saw several problems. In the month of June manager and player relations were at a low. Scully is rumoured to have clashed with Barry Murphy, Ger O'Brien and Stephen Rice due to their involvement with the Ireland Under 23 squad. This led to Rice handing in a transfer request and ultimately being demoted to the Under 21 squad. Rice returned for a match with St. Patrick's Athletic on 21 July 2008.

His relationship with other squad members was also questioned following disputes with Dessie Baker and Barry Ferguson during the same period.

== Honours ==
Huddersfield Town

- Football League Second Division play-offs: 1995
- Football League Trophy runner-up: 1993–94
