= Chris Billy =

English footballer

Personal information
- Full name: Christopher Anthony Billy
- Date of birth: 2 January 1973 (age 53)
- Place of birth: Huddersfield, England
- Height: 5 ft 11 in (1.80 m)
- Position: Midfielder

Senior career*
Years	Team	Apps	(Gls)
1991–1995	Huddersfield Town	94	(4)
1995–1998	Plymouth Argyle	118	(8)
1998	Notts County	6	(0)
1998–2003	Bury	178	(11)
2003–2007	Carlisle United	142	(3)
2007	Halifax Town	13	(0)
2007–2008	Farsley Celtic	15	(0)
2008	→ Ossett Town (loan)		
Total		566	(26)
- * Club domestic league appearances and goals

Christopher Anthony Billy is an English retired professional footballer who played as a midfielder. He played in the Football League for Huddersfield Town, Plymouth Argyle, Notts County, Bury and Carlisle United. He also played for Halifax Town, Farsley Celtic and Ossett Town. Known as the Black Pearl during his playing time with Carlisle United.

== Career ==
Billy began his career with Huddersfield Town in 1991. He scored the winning goal in the Second Division play-off final at Wembley Stadium in 1995 that saw Huddersfield promoted to the First Division under the management of Neil Warnock. The latter resigned within days and was appointed manager of Plymouth Argyle, who had just been relegated to the Third Division, and he signed Billy in August. He scored four goals in his first season with the club as they gained promotion via the play-offs, and made 137 appearances in all competitions during his three seasons with Argyle, scoring nine times. He had a brief spell with Notts County in 1998 before being signed by Warnock again, this time for Bury. He spent five seasons with Bury and amassed 178 league appearances, with 11 goals.

He left Bury in 2003 and moved to Carlisle United, where he experienced relegation from the Football League in his first season with the club. Carlisle made a swift return from the Football Conference the following season, gaining promotion through the play-offs. Gaining back to back promotions winning league 2 the following year. Having made 142 appearances for Carlisle, Billy was transferred to Halifax Town in January 2007. Eight months later, he was released from his contract to join Farsley Celtic. He spent time on loan with Ossett Town, having signed in February 2008, before retiring as a player.

== Honours ==
Huddersfield Town

- Football League Second Division play-offs: 1995
- Football League Trophy runner-up: 1993–94

Plymouth Argyle

- Football League Third Division play-offs: 1996

Carlisle United

- Football League Two: 2005–06
- Football Conference play-offs: 2005
- Football League Trophy runner-up: 2005–06

Individual

- Plymouth Argyle Player of the Year: 1996–97
- Bury Player of the Year: 2000–01
