= Gary Crosby (footballer) =

English footballer

Personal information
- Date of birth: 8 May 1964 (age 62)
- Place of birth: Sleaford, England
- Position: Midfielder

Team information
- Current team: Mansfield Town (Assistant Manager)

Senior career*
Years	Team	Apps	(Gls)
1982–1987	Lincoln United		
1986–1987	Lincoln City	7	(0)
1986–1988	Lincoln United		
1987–1988	Grantham Town	9	(2)
1987–1994	Nottingham Forest	152	(12)
1993	→ Grimsby Town (loan)	3	(0)
1994–1997	Huddersfield Town	44	(6)
1997–1998	Rushden & Diamonds	4	(0)
1998	Lincoln United		
1998–2005	Burton Albion	3	(0)
Total		218	(20)
- * Club domestic league appearances and goals

Gary Crosby (born 8 May 1964) is an English footballer who played as a midfielder.

He is the current assistant manager of Mansfield Town.

== Playing career ==
Crosby played for Lincoln United in his teens. He had been one of the most promising players in the Lincoln area and regularly appeared for Lincoln City's youth and reserve sides. A slight but skilful player, it was often felt his physique would prevent him turning professional. He was finally given an opportunity in the professional ranks when he joined Lincoln City on non-contract terms in September 1987. However, in a struggling team he found it difficult to make an impact and made just seven appearances for the Imps before rejoining Lincoln United.

In 1988, Crosby came to the attention of Grantham Town manager Martin O'Neill while playing for the Lincolnshire County FA side and was soon signed by Grantham on a free transfer. He made just nine appearances for the Gingerbreads scoring twice.

Crosby joined Nottingham Forest for £20,000 (a Grantham club record) in December 1987 where he went on to make 152 appearances, scoring 12 goals, during a seven-year career at the City Ground. During his time at Forest the club played in numerous cup finals at Wembley. His most famous goal came against Manchester City in a 1–0 win for Forest in March 1990, when he headed the ball out of goalkeeper Andy Dibble's hand before rolling the ball into an empty net. Crosby spent three games on loan at Grimsby Town during the 1993–94 season.

He joined Huddersfield Town on a free transfer in 1994. Crosby made just 44 appearances for the club, scoring six goals. His spell at the Yorkshire club included an appearance at Wembley in the playoff final.

The 1997–98 season saw him play a handful of times for Rushden & Diamonds. He returned to Lincoln United for the start of the 1998–99 season.

== Coaching career ==
His return to Ashby Avenue was to be short lived and in October 1998 he linked up with close friend Nigel Clough, joining Burton Albion as player/assistant manager. Their first game in charge came at Grantham in an FA Trophy replay at The Meres, in which Albion won 3–0. Crosby made his debut for the Brewers in the 1–1 draw with Nuneaton Borough on 3 November 1998. The 2001/02 season saw Burton win the Unibond Premier Division title and promotion into the Conference under the Clough/Crosby management. Crosby resigned from his position as assistant manager in January 2005, due to work commitments. However, following a short time out of the game Crosby returned to Burton Albion ahead of the 2006/07 season. By Christmas of the 2008/09 season Clough and Crosby had led Burton Albion to a 13-point lead at the top of the Conference National; however, in January 2009 Clough left Burton Albion to replace Paul Jewell as manager of Derby County.

In January 2009 Crosby followed Nigel Clough to Derby County taking the position of assistant manager. After the departure of Nigel Clough from Derby County in 2013 Crosby followed Clough to Sheffield United acting as coaching staff.

He later returned to Burton Albion (2015-2020) alongside manager Clough before their appointment by Mansfield Town in November 2020.

== Honours ==
Nottingham Forest

- Football League Cup: 1989–90; runner-up: 1991–92
- Full Members' Cup: 1991–92
- FA Cup runner-up: 1990–91

Huddersfield Town

- Football League Second Division play-offs: 1995
