= Iain Dunn =

English association football player

Personal information
- Full name: Iain George William Dunn
- Date of birth: 1 April 1970 (age 56)
- Place of birth: York, England
- Height: 5 ft 8 in (1.73 m)
- Position: Winger

Senior career*
Years	Team	Apps	(Gls)
1988–1991	York City	77	(11)
1991–1992	Chesterfield	13	(1)
1992	Scarborough		
1992	Peterborough United	0	(0)
1992	Scarborough		
1992	Goole Town		
1992–1997	Huddersfield Town	120	(14)
1996	→ Scunthorpe United (loan)	3	(0)
1997–1999	Chesterfield	18	(0)
Total		231	(26)
- * Club domestic league appearances and goals

Iain George William Dunn (born 1 April 1970) is an English former professional footballer who played as a winger in the Football League for York City, Chesterfield, Huddersfield Town and Scunthorpe United.

== Early life ==
Iain George William Dunn was born on 1 April 1970 in York, where he was raised.

== Career ==
Whilst in his second spell at Chesterfield he helped them reach the FA Cup semi-final in 1997, playing as a substitute in the quarter-final tie against Wrexham. However, he did not play in the semi-final, in which Chesterfield lost to Middlesbrough after a replay.

Dunn was the first player in British football to score a golden goal. He achieved this feat in the Football League Trophy for Huddersfield Town versus Lincoln City on 30 November 1994. Huddersfield won 3–2 in extra time. Dunn was later presented with a commemorative trophy.

Always a cult figure, Dunn polarised fans' opinions; despite this he was voted Huddersfield Town's all-time cult hero by the club's fans in an August 2004 poll for the BBC's Football Focus programme, and was included in the fans' all-time 100 favourite players.

== Personal life ==
Dunn is currently a street environment officer for City of York Council.

Since 2017, Dunn has been a match summariser on BBC Radio York's York City match commentary.

== Honours ==
Huddersfield Town

- Football League Second Division play-offs: 1995
- Football League Trophy runner-up: 1993–94
