= Simon Collins (footballer) =

English footballer (born 1973)

Personal information
- Full name: Simon Jonathan Collins
- Date of birth: 16 December 1973 (age 52)
- Place of birth: Pontefract, England
- Position: Defender

Youth career
- Huddersfield Town

Senior career*
| Years | Team | Apps | (Gls) |
| 1992–1997 | Huddersfield Town | 52 | (3) |
| 1993–1994 | → Happy Valley AA (loan) | ? | (?) |
| 1994 | → Halifax Town (loan) | 3 | (0) |
| 1997–1999 | Plymouth Argyle | 84 | (5) |
| 1999–2001 | Macclesfield Town | 56 | (4) |
| 2001 | → Shrewsbury Town (loan) | 12 | (0) |
| 2001–2002 | Frickley Athletic | 47 | (13) |
| 2002 | Belper Town | | |
| 2002–2003 | Bradford Park Avenue | | |
| 2003–2004 | Belper Town | | |
| 2004–2007 | Frickley Athletic | | |
| 2007 | Grantham Town | 2 | (0) |
| 2007 | Ossett Town | | |
| 2007 | Stocksbridge Park Steels | | |

Managerial career
- 2007–2009: Ossett Town
- 2009–2010: Stocksbridge Park Steels
- 2010: Bradford Park Avenue
- * Club domestic league appearances and goals

Simon Jonathan Collins (born 16 December 1973) is an English former professional footballer, born in Pontefract, Yorkshire, who made 200 appearances in the Football League playing as a defender for Huddersfield Town, Plymouth Argyle, Macclesfield Town and Shrewsbury Town. He was manager of Bradford Park Avenue, having previously been in charge at Ossett Town and Stocksbridge Park Steels.

== Career ==
Collins started his career as a trainee at Huddersfield Town, spending time on loan to Halifax Town before joining Plymouth Argyle in 1997. He appeared in the famous Jimmy Glass game, in which Carlisle United's goalkeeper scored in the 94th minute to save his club from relegation from the Football League. After leaving Argyle in 1999 he played for Macclesfield Town and Shrewsbury Town in the league, and then for non-league clubs Frickley Athletic, Belper Town, Bradford Park Avenue, Grantham Town, Ossett Town, and Stocksbridge Park Steels.

He then went into coaching, and managed Ossett Town from 2007 to 2009 before taking over as manager of Stocksbridge Park Steels in September 2009. Collins left Stocksbridge in March 2010, just six months after joining, before being appointed new Bradford Park Avenue manager in May 2010, following the end of the 2009–10 season.

His younger brother Sam also became a professional footballer; the brothers played alongside each other for Huddersfield Town.
