= Darren Bullock =

English footballer

Personal information
- Full name: Darren John Bullock
- Date of birth: 12 February 1969 (age 57)
- Place of birth: Worcester, England
- Height: 5 ft 8 in (1.73 m)
- Position: Central midfielder

Senior career*
Years	Team	Apps	(Gls)
1992–1993	Nuneaton Borough	?	(?)
1993–1997	Huddersfield Town	128	(17)
1997–1999	Swindon Town	53	(5)
1999–2001	Bury	63	(9)
2000	→ Rushden & Diamonds (loan)	4	(0)
2001	→ Sheffield United (loan)	6	(0)
2001–2002	Worcester City	1	(0)
- * Club domestic league appearances and goals

Darren John Bullock (born 12 February 1969) is an English former professional footballer who played for several clubs, including Huddersfield Town, Swindon Town, and Bury.

Bullock started his playing career at non-league Malvern Town, before moving to Nuneaton Borough. In the summer of 1993, Huddersfield Town paid £55,000 for his combative midfield services where he became a firm fans' favourite for his no-holds-barred style of play and aggressive tackling. In 1995, he was a major part in Huddersfield Town winning promotion to the Division One as Division Two playoff winners, and reaching the FA Cup fifth round (losing to Wimbledon in the replay) and finishing eighth in the league a year later, narrowly missing out on a second successive play-off campaign.

In 1997, he moved to Swindon Town for £400,000 where he made 71 appearances and scored twice during two years at the County Ground from where he moved to Bury in 1999 for £200,000 - making 63 appearances and scoring nine times.

He was loaned out to Rushden & Diamonds and Sheffield United (where he was reunited with Neil Warnock who signed him for Huddersfield) before being released on a free transfer to Worcester City. He was sacked by Worcester City over disciplinary problems in March 2002.

Bullock was appointed manager of Midland Football Combination team Archdales '73 in July 2010, this is his first attempt at professional management.

In 2006, he appeared in the book 100 Fans' Favourites written by Alisdair Straughan and published by Huddersfield Town for their Centenary.

Bullock also features on website Who Are Ya?! as a Huddersfield Town icon.

== Honours ==
Huddersfield Town

- Football League Second Division play-offs: 1995
- Football League Trophy runner-up: 1993–94
