= Tom Cowan =

Scottish footballer

Personal information
- Full name: Thomas Cowan
- Date of birth: 28 August 1969 (age 57)
- Place of birth: Bellshill, Scotland
- Height: 5 ft 8 in (1.73 m)
- Position: Defender

Youth career
- Holytown Colts
- Netherdale Boys Club

Senior career*
Years	Team	Apps	(Gls)
1988–1989	Clyde	16	(2)
1989–1991	Rangers	12	(0)
1991–1994	Sheffield United	45	(0)
1993–1994	→ Stoke City (loan)	14	(0)
1994	→ Huddersfield Town (loan)	10	(0)
1994–1999	Huddersfield Town	127	(7)
1999–2000	Burnley	20	(1)
2000	→ Cambridge United (loan)	4	(0)
2000–2002	Cambridge United	46	(3)
2002	→ Peterborough United (loan)	5	(1)
2002–2003	York City	33	(1)
2003	Dundee	5	(1)
2003–2005	Carlisle United	52	(3)
2005	Barrow	21	(3)
2006	Workington	20	(1)
2006–2007	Hucknall Town	18	(0)
2007	Stalybridge Celtic	6	(0)
2007–2008	Hyde United	8	(1)
Total		449	(24)
- * Club domestic league appearances and goals

Thomas Cowan (born 28 August 1969) is a Scottish former footballer who played as a defender.

During his career he played for Clyde, Rangers, Sheffield United, Stoke City, Huddersfield Town, Burnley, Cambridge United, Peterborough United, York City, Dundee, Carlisle United, Barrow, Workington, Hucknall Town, Stalybridge Celtic, Hyde United and Retford United.

== Career ==
Cowan was born in Bellshill and began his career with Holytown Colts and Netherdale Boys Club before joining Clyde in 1988; he spent most of the 1988–89 season playing for Clyde while also working in a Lanarkshire steelworks and was then signed by Rangers before the end of that campaign, at the end of which the Glasgow club won the Scottish Premier Division.

Cowan was at Ibrox for another two years, both of which also ended in championship success, but was competing for a place with the experienced Stuart Munro and fellow youngster Chris Vinnicombe and had only a peripheral role. He did feature in the European Cup against Bayern Munich in Germany (the team having lost at home in the first leg), and in what proved to be his final appearance, took part in the title decider in 1991 when a depleted Rangers squad defeated Aberdeen 2–0; however he suffered a broken leg during the match (attempting to play on with the injury for several minutes before being substituted) and the club then signed the left back of the opposition on that day, David Robertson, to fill the position.

He next moved to English club Sheffield United, and played in 24 matches in 1991–92 as the Blades finished 9th in the Football League First Division. They finished in 14th position in 1992–93 (the inaugural season of the new Premier League) with Cowan playing in 25 matches. He lost his place in the side under Dave Bassett and joined Stoke City on loan in 1993–94. He played 18 matches for Stoke, 14 of which came in the league. Cowan joined Huddersfield Town, initially on loan in March 1994, and then permanent for a fee of £150,000 in July 1994.

Cowan enjoyed the most successful period of his career with the Terriers as he made 155 appearances for the club in six seasons (including one in which he did not play at all after rupturing the anterior cruciate ligament in his knee), helping them gain promotion in 1994–95 and reach the 1994 Football League Trophy final where they lost on penalties to Swansea City. He then had short spells at Burnley, Cambridge United, Peterborough United (scoring once against Wrexham) and York City (scoring once against Bury).

He returned to Scotland in August 2003, joining Dundee. He made his debut for Dundee on 31 August against Kilmarnock and scored on his second appearance in a 2–0 victory over Aberdeen on 20 September. However, after making six appearances for the club his contract was terminated after Dundee entered administration and he joined Carlisle United on 27 November 2003. His first season ended with the Cumbrian club being relegated to the Conference National, though he did help them gain an instant return to the Football League as they beat Stevenage Borough in the play-off final. He decided not to sign a new deal at Brunton Park and was released at the end of the season.

After leaving Carlisle, Cowan joined Barrow in the Conference North. From there he played for Workington, Hucknall Town and Stalybridge Celtic.

== After football ==
After retiring from playing, Cowan became a firefighter and joined the South Yorkshire Fire and Rescue Service, speaking of the profession's collective ethos and camaraderie as being similar to his experience as a footballer. Tom is based at Parkway Fire Station and is one of the only ex professional footballers to hold a Turntable Ladder license.

== Career statistics ==
Appearances and goals by club, season and competition
Club	Season	League			FA Cup		League Cup		Other^{[A]}		Total	
Club	Season	Division	Apps	Goals	Apps	Goals	Apps	Goals	Apps	Goals	Apps	Goals
Clyde	1988–89	Scottish First Division	16	2	0	0	0	0	0	0	16	2
Rangers	1988–89	Scottish Premier Division	4	0	0	0	0	0	0	0	4	0
Rangers	1989–90	Scottish Premier Division	3	0	0	0	0	0	1	0	4	0
Rangers	1990–91	Scottish Premier Division	5	0	1	0	0	0	1	0	7	0
Rangers	Total		12	0	1	0	0	0	2	0	15	0
Sheffield United	1991–92	First Division	20	0	1	0	2	0	1	0	24	0
Sheffield United	1992–93	Premier League	21	0	1	0	3	0	0	0	25	0
Sheffield United	1993–94	Premier League	4	0	0	0	0	0	0	0	4	0
Sheffield United	Total		45	0	2	0	5	0	1	0	53	0
Stoke City (loan)	1993–94	First Division	14	0	0	0	1	0	3	0	18	0
Huddersfield Town	1993–94	Second Division	10	0	0	0	0	0	1	0	11	0
Huddersfield Town	1994–95	Second Division	37	2	2	0	4	0	5	0	48	2
Huddersfield Town	1995–96	First Division	43	2	4	1	4	0	0	0	51	3
Huddersfield Town	1996–97	First Division	42	4	1	0	5	1	0	0	48	5
Huddersfield Town	1997–98	First Division	0	0	0	0	0	0	0	0	0	0
Huddersfield Town	1998–99	First Division	5	0	2	0	0	0	0	0	7	0
Huddersfield Town	Total		127	8	9	1	13	1	6	0	155	10
Burnley	1998–99	Second Division	12	1	0	0	0	0	0	0	12	1
Burnley	1999–2000	Second Division	8	0	0	0	2	0	1	0	11	0
Burnley	Total		20	1	0	0	2	0	1	0	23	1
Cambridge United	1999–2000	Second Division	4	0	0	0	0	0	0	0	4	0
Cambridge United	2000–01	Second Division	41	2	1	0	1	0	0	0	43	2
Cambridge United	2001–02	Second Division	5	1	0	0	0	0	0	0	5	1
Cambridge United	Total		50	3	1	0	1	0	0	0	52	3
Peterborough United (loan)	2001–02	Second Division	5	1	0	0	0	0	0	0	5	1
York City	2002–03	Third Division	33	1	0	0	1	0	0	0	34	1
Dundee	2003–04	Scottish Premier League	5	1	0	0	0	0	1	0	6	1
Carlisle United	2003–04	Third Division	20	1	0	0	0	0	0	0	20	1
Carlisle United	2004–05	Conference National	29	2	3	0	0	0	5	0	37	2
Carlisle United	Total		29	3	3	0	0	0	5	0	57	3
Career Total			356	20	16	1	23	1	19	0	414	22

A. The "Other" column constitutes appearances and goals in the Anglo-Italian Cup, Conference National play-offs, Football League Trophy, Football League play-offs, Full Members Cup and UEFA Cup.

== Honours ==
Rangers

- Scottish Football League Premier Division: 1988–89, 1989–90, 1990–91

Huddersfield Town

- Football League Second Division play-offs: 1995
- Football League Trophy runner-up: 1993–94

Carlisle United

- Conference National play-offs: 2005

Individual

- PFA Team of the Year: 1994–95 Second Division
- Huddersfield Town Player of the Year: 1995–96, 1996–97
