= Andy Booth =

English footballer

Personal information
- Full name: Andrew David Booth
- Date of birth: 6 December 1973 (age 52)
- Place of birth: Huddersfield, England
- Height: 6 ft 0 in (1.83 m)
- Position: Striker

Youth career
- Huddersfield Town
- Scarborough
- Huddersfield Town

Senior career*
| Years | Team | Apps | (Gls) |
| 1992–1996 | Huddersfield Town | 123 | (54) |
| 1996–2001 | Sheffield Wednesday | 133 | (28) |
| 2001 | → Tottenham Hotspur (loan) | 4 | (0) |
| 2001–2009 | Huddersfield Town | 270 | (80) |
| Total | | 530 | (162) |

International career
| 1995 | England U21 | 3 | (2) |
- * Club domestic league appearances and goals

Andrew David Booth (born 6 December 1973) is an English former professional footballer who played as a striker.

He notably played in the Premier League for both Sheffield Wednesday and Tottenham Hotspur. He also played in the Football League for Huddersfield Town where he played just under 400 league appearances over two spells. He represented his country with the England U21s and was capped three times, scoring two goals.

== Club career ==
=== Huddersfield Town ===
Booth was born in Huddersfield, England. At the age of 11 he attended Salendine Nook High School. Andy began his career playing for his home town club as a trainee, making his first team debut as a substitute in a 1–0 defeat at Fulham in March 1992, but had to wait until November that year to score his first goal (in a 2–2 draw at Blackpool) for the club. A few more goals followed in the 1992–93 season, but it was the season after, the last at Huddersfield Town's Leeds Road ground, that he really forced his way into the first team.

The next season was probably the best of Booth's career. Partnered with Ronnie Jepson, Booth netted 29 goals, of which six came in two hat-tricks, and finished the season by scoring one more in the play-offs, guiding the Terriers to promotion into Division One. His efforts got him international recognition and earned him an England debut for the England Under-21s. Then-manager Neil Warnock described him as "the best header of a ball outside the Premier League". The next season, in which Huddersfield finished just outside the playoff spots in the division above proved to be the last Booth would play for Huddersfield after four seasons, during which he had scored 53 league goals for the club.

=== Sheffield Wednesday ===
In the summer of 1996, Sheffield Wednesday bought Booth for £2.7 million, and his goal-scoring form continued into the Premiership, scoring 13 goals for the Owls as they finished seventh in his first season making him the club's highest goal scorer for that season. In his second season with Wednesday, he scored only seven goals and Booth was never to reach double figures in the Premiership again. Despite this, Booth had many highlights at Sheffield Wednesday including a hat-trick on his return to the team following an operation, against Bolton Wanderers. In a game against Liverpool in May 1997 Booth was required to go in goal after Kevin Pressman had gone off injured and his replacement, Matt Clarke, was sent off. Booth made a number of saves to help Wednesday secure a 1–1 draw.

Booth stayed with Wednesday until 2001, a period which included their relegation from the top flight. It was during his final season with the Owls that he made his final Premiership appearances, during a loan spell with Tottenham Hotspur, and his Wednesday career came to an end shortly after his return to Hillsborough.

=== Return to Huddersfield ===
In March 2001, Huddersfield Town were struggling towards the bottom of Division One. On 22 March they paid Sheffield Wednesday £200,000 for the services of Booth, who returned with the intention of scoring the goals that would help him avoid his second successive relegation, and keep the club he had supported as a boy in the division he helped them reach. However, his goals were not sufficient and Huddersfield Town were relegated.

In his first full season back with the club, he helped them into the play-offs. Despite another goal for Booth, Huddersfield lost to Brentford and were denied the opportunity to bounce straight back. Worse was to follow next season, when Booth's six goals did little to help his team avoid relegation, and they fell into the bottom division for the first time since 1980.

Despite this setback, Booth stayed with Huddersfield Town and his experienced head was crucial in guiding a team of youngsters through a difficult season, culminating in a drop into the play-offs on the last day of the season. This time, though, Huddersfield were victorious at the Millennium Stadium in Cardiff.

At the time plying their trade in League One. Booth had scored 23 goals in that period, including his 100th league goal for the club (after which a DVD was released showing all 100 goals) and a hat-trick, all headers, on 18 March 2006 against Rotherham United.

At the end of the 2005–06 season, following another play-off appearance (defeat against Barnsley over two legs), Booth had scored 12 goals for Huddersfield Town.

To commemorate Booth's service to the club, Town played a testimonial match against Spanish La Liga side Real Sociedad on 25 July 2006. The game finished 0–0 in front of over 7,000 people.

On 1 February 2007, he signed a one-year extension to his contract till the summer of 2008. On 15 February 2008, Huddersfield Town fans gave a petition to Parliament that would allow a statue of him to be erected in Huddersfield. On 26 April 2008, he became the first player to sign a contract extension under new manager Stan Ternent, which would keep him at the club until the summer of 2009.

On 22 April 2009, Booth announced his intention to retire from playing and become an ambassador for the club. His playing registration will be kept by the club, in case he is required in the future.

On 25 April 2009, in his final appearance at the Galpharm Stadium, Booth was made captain of the Huddersfield team. He opened the scoring in a 2–2 draw against Brighton & Hove Albion to score his 149th goal for the club. After being substituted in the last few minutes of the match, Booth earned a standing ovation from both Huddersfield and Brighton fans.

The following week, in his final match for the Terriers, he scored his 150th goal for the club in the 1–1 draw against Leyton Orient at Brisbane Road his goal was final goal greeted with delirious celebration in the away fans section and Orient supporters applauding too. That puts him in 3rd place on the all-time list behind Jimmy Glazzard and George Brown. His 452 appearances put him in 4th place on the appearances list.

== International career ==
Booth represented England International for the England Under 21s, winning three caps, scoring twice for the England Under 21s in 1995 and also represented the Football League during his first spell at Town.

== Personal life ==
Andy and his wife Cheryl have two children.

== Honours ==
Huddersfield Town

- Football League Second Division play-offs: 1995
- Football League Third Division play-offs: 2004
- Football League Trophy runner-up: 1993–94

Individual

- PFA Team of the Year: 1994–95 Second Division
