= Steve Francis (footballer) =

English footballer

Personal information
- Full name: Stephen Stuart Francis
- Date of birth: 29 May 1964 (age 62)
- Place of birth: Billericay, England
- Height: 5 ft 11 in (1.80 m)
- Position: Goalkeeper

Youth career
- 1980–1981: Chelsea

Senior career*
| Years | Team | Apps | (Gls) |
| 1981–1987 | Chelsea | 71 | (0) |
| 1987–1993 | Reading | 216 | (0) |
| 1993–1999 | Huddersfield Town | 186 | (0) |
| 1999 | Northampton Town | 3 | (0) |
| Total | | 476 | (0) |

International career
| 1982 | England Youth | 2 | (0) |
- * Club domestic league appearances and goals

Stephen Stuart Francis (born 29 May 1964) is an English former professional footballer, born in Billericay, Essex, who made nearly 500 appearances in the Football League playing as a goalkeeper for Chelsea, Reading, Huddersfield Town and Northampton Town.

== Career ==
Francis signed as an apprentice for Chelsea in July 1980, and made his debut as a 17-year-old at Wigan in the League Cup in November 1981, and made his League debut in November 1981. Francis was initially a regular in the side, but the arrival of new goalkeeper Eddie Niedzwiecki in 1983 saw him relegated to the reserves for most of the next three seasons. Francis returned to the first team after an injury to Niedzwiecki, but conceded 14 goals in three games over Easter 1986 and never played for the club again. He made a total of 88 appearances in all competitions for Chelsea.

Francis played in the Full Members Cup Final at Wembley in 1986 when Chelsea beat Manchester City 5–4, Niedzwiecki was injured for this match.

He left in 1987 to join Reading for £15,000, where he played a further 250 games and won the club's Player of the Year award in the 1986–87 season, before joining Huddersfield Town in 1993.

He was Huddersfield's first-choice goalkeeper for four seasons, then fell out of favour early in the 1997–98 season. Huddersfield loaned in goalkeepers Vince Bartram and Steve Harper before signing Nico Vaesen in the summer of 1998. Francis left in January 1999 to join Northampton Town, where he made just three league appearances.

== Honours ==
Chelsea

- Full Members' Cup: 1985–86

Reading

- Full Members' Cup: 1987–88

Huddersfield Town

- Football League Second Division play-offs: 1995
- Football League Trophy runner-up: 1993–94
