= Jon Dyson =

English footballer

Personal information
- Full name: Jonathan Paul Dyson
- Date of birth: 18 December 1971 (age 54)
- Place of birth: Mirfield, England
- Position: Defender

Senior career*
Years	Team	Apps	(Gls)
1990–2003	Huddersfield Town	216	(9)
2003	→ Nuneaton Borough (loan)	10	(0)
- Farsley Celtic
- * Club domestic league appearances and goals

Jonathan Paul Dyson (born 18 December 1971) is an English former professional footballer who played as a central defender.

A Business Studies graduate from Huddersfield University, Dyson now works full-time as an independent financial advisor based in Bradford.

== Honours ==
Huddersfield Town

- Football League Second Division play-offs: 1995
