= 1999–2000 Huddersfield Town A.F.C. season =

Huddersfield Town
1999–2000 season
- Chairman: Ian Ayre
- Manager: Steve Bruce
- Stadium: Kirklees Stadium
- Division One: 8th
- FA Cup: Third round (eliminated by Liverpool)
- League Cup: Fourth round (eliminated by Wimbledon)
- Top goalscorer: League: Clyde Wijnhard (15); All: Clyde Wijnhard (16)
- Highest home attendance: 23,678 vs Liverpool (12 December 1999)
- Lowest home attendance: 4,345 vs Scunthorpe United (24 August 1999)
- Biggest win: 7–1 vs Crystal Palace (28 August 1999)
- Biggest defeat: 0–3 vs Bolton Wanderers (22 April 2000); 0–3 vs Fulham (7 May 2000)
Home colours	Away colours	Third colours

This page documents Huddersfield Town's 1999–2000 season.

Following the sacking of Peter Jackson at the end of the previous season, owner Barry Rubery hired Steve Bruce as his replacement, and Huddersfield finished in 8th place in Division One that season, just 2 points outside the play-offs. This season also saw Town beat Chelsea at Stamford Bridge in the League Cup.

== Squad at the start of the season ==
Note: Flags indicate national team as defined under FIFA eligibility rules; some limited exceptions apply. Players may hold more than one non-FIFA nationality.

No.	Pos.	Nation	Player
1	GK	BEL	Nico Vaesen
2	DF	WAL	Steve Jenkins
3	DF	ENG	Jamie Vincent
4	DF	ENG	Craig Armstrong
5	DF	ENG	Chris Lucketti
6	DF	ENG	Kevin Gray
7	MF	GRE	Georgios Donis
8	MF	ENG	Kenny Irons
9	FW	ENG	Marcus Stewart
10	MF	ENG	Scott Sellars
11	FW	SUR	Clyde Wijnhard

No.	Pos.	Nation	Player
12	MF	ENG	Ben Thornley
13	GK	WAL	Martyn Margetson
14	MF	WAL	Barry Horne
15	DF	ENG	Rob Edwards
17	MF	ENG	Simon Baldry
18	DF	ENG	Darren Edmondson
19	MF	ENG	David Beresford
20	FW	ENG	Wayne Allison
21	DF	ENG	Jon Dyson
22	MF	ENG	Chris Beech
37	DF	ENG	Steve Baker (on loan from Middlesbrough)

== Review ==
Rubery and managing director Ian Ayre talked up the side's chances of promotion, pointing to the acquisition of the high-profile Steve Bruce as a clear indication of their ambition. More serious investment brought the likes of Clyde Wijnhard, Chris Lucketti, Georgios Donis, Scott Sellars, Kenny Irons, Ken Monkou and Dean Gorré to the club. The Terriers tore up the Division for the first few months playing attractive attacking football in the 7–1 annihilation of Crystal Palace (their best league result for 20 years), plus notable wins over rivals Ipswich Town, recently relegated Premier League side Blackburn Rovers, Manchester City and Nottingham Forest. During October and November, Town won 6 games in a row, a best for 17 years. In early October, the side even scored a famous 1–0 victory over Chelsea at Stamford Bridge in the League Cup and were widely considered to be 'the best Town side in 30 years'. They lost to fellow Premier League side Wimbledon in the next round.

By Christmas time, Town were top of the table, but the loss of key defenders Steve Jenkins, Chris Lucketti, Ken Monkou and David May (who only made one appearance for Town because of injury) all suffered injuries at the wrong time. At the turn of the year, with the side suffering a blip in form, manager Bruce accepted the BBC's offer to cover previous club Manchester United's involvement in the much-derided FIFA Club World Championship in Brazil. With Town's form suffering, his popularity with the club's supporters plummeted. A run of 2 wins in 13 games didn't help things much either. Also during that run star striker Marcus Stewart was surprisingly sold to fellow 1st Division side Ipswich Town for a record fee of £2.75million. Less than a month later, he scored Ipswich's winning goal in a 2–1 win between the sides at Portman Road. Town signed Sheffield United's striker Martin Smith. Following that dreadful run Town went on a run of 6 games unbeaten, which saw Town on the verge of a play-off place with 4 games left.

After losing 3–0 at home to fellow play-off contenders Bolton Wanderers, they beat relegated Port Vale, meaning Town would get a play-off spot by winning their last 2 games at home to Stockport County and away to Fulham at Craven Cottage, but instead they lost them 2-0 and 3-0 respectively. In the end, if they won either of those last 2 games they would have got a play-off place.

== Squad at the end of the season ==
Note: Flags indicate national team as defined under FIFA eligibility rules; some limited exceptions apply. Players may hold more than one non-FIFA nationality.

No.	Pos.	Nation	Player
1	GK	BEL	Nico Vaesen
2	DF	WAL	Steve Jenkins
3	DF	ENG	Jamie Vincent
4	DF	ENG	Craig Armstrong
5	DF	ENG	Chris Lucketti
6	DF	ENG	Kevin Gray
7	MF	GRE	Georgios Donis
8	MF	ENG	Kenny Irons
9	FW	ENG	Martin Smith
10	MF	ENG	Scott Sellars
11	FW	SUR	Clyde Wijnhard
12	MF	ENG	Ben Thornley
13	GK	WAL	Martyn Margetson

No.	Pos.	Nation	Player
14	FW	ENG	Alun Armstrong (on loan from Middlesbrough)
15	DF	ENG	Rob Edwards
16	FW	GRN	Delroy Facey
17	MF	ENG	Simon Baldry
18	FW	SCO	Chris Hay
19	MF	ENG	David Beresford
20	DF	IRL	Thomas Heary
21	DF	ENG	Jon Dyson
22	MF	ENG	Chris Beech
23	MF	ENG	Chris Holland
38	DF	SUR	Ken Monkou
39	FW	THA	Kiatisuk Senamuang
40	MF	SUR	Dean Gorré

== Results ==
=== Division One ===
Date	Opponents	Home/ Away	Result F - A	Scorers	Attendance	Position
7 August 1999	Queens Park Rangers	A	1 - 3	Wijnhard [65]	13,642	21st
13 August 1999	Blackburn Rovers	H	3 - 2	Grayson [26 (og)], Stewart [51], Edwards [90]	13,670	7th
21 August 1999	Tranmere Rovers	A	0 - 1		6,728	18th
28 August 1999	Crystal Palace	H	7 - 1	Beech [18], Wijnhard [25, 60, 64], Irons [36], Stewart [47, 74]	10,656	7th
30 August 1999	Portsmouth	A	0 - 0		13,105	7th
11 September 1999	Wolverhampton Wanderers	A	1 - 0	Stewart [60 (pen)]	20,385	5th
18 September 1999	Norwich City	H	1 - 0	Wijnhard [51]	12,823	4th
25 September 1999	Barnsley	A	2 - 4	Monkou [19], Stewart [71]	17,765	6th
2 October 1999	Sheffield United	H	4 - 1	Beech [14], Wijnhard [28], Stewart [57, 90]	14,238	6th
9 October 1999	Port Vale	H	2 - 2	Stewart [2 (pen)], Irons [30]	11,885	6th
16 October 1999	Bolton Wanderers	A	0 - 1		16,603	7th
19 October 1999	Stockport County	A	1 - 1	Sellars [89]	7,305	8th
23 October 1999	Fulham	H	1 - 1	Wijnhard [75]	13,350	8th
26 October 1999	Barnsley	H	2 - 1	Wijnhard [13], Baldry [89]	15,764	5th
30 October 1999	Sheffield United	A	1 - 0	Dyson [51]	14,928	5th
2 November 1999	Ipswich Town	H	3 - 1	Dyson [37], Beech [48], Stewart [57]	12,093	3rd
6 November 1999	Swindon Town	H	4 - 0	Beech [9], Thornley [35], Gorré [57, 63]	11,891	3rd
14 November 1999	Nottingham Forest	A	3 - 1	Wijnhard [22, 63], Gray [34]	15,258	3rd
20 November 1999	West Bromwich Albion	H	1 - 0	Gorré [55]	14,244	2nd
23 November 1999	Walsall	A	0 - 2		5,860	3rd
27 November 1999	Manchester City	A	1 - 0	Beech [51]	32,936	2nd
4 December 1999	Queens Park Rangers	H	1 - 0	Wijnhard [31]	13,027	1st
18 December 1999	Grimsby Town	H	3 - 1	Wijnhard [6, 25], Stewart [63]	14,065	1st
26 December 1999	Crewe Alexandra	A	1 - 1	Beech [47]	8,106	2nd
28 December 1999	Charlton Athletic	H	1 - 2	Stewart [80]	17,415	2nd
3 January 2000	Birmingham City	A	0 - 1		19,958	5th
15 January 2000	Blackburn Rovers	A	0 - 2		21,420	5th
22 January 2000	Tranmere Rovers	H	1 - 0	Stewart [12]	12,653	5th
29 January 2000	Crystal Palace	A	2 - 2	Stewart [34, 41]	14,290	5th
5 February 2000	Portsmouth	H	0 - 1		12,753	5th
12 February 2000	Ipswich Town	A	1 - 2	Gorré [56]	21,233	5th
18 February 2000	Manchester City	H	1 - 1	Wijnhard [32]	18,173	5th
26 February 2000	Norwich City	A	1 - 1	Vincent [65]	16,464	5th
4 March 2000	Wolverhampton Wanderers	H	2 - 0	Smith [20, 34]	17,214	6th
7 March 2000	Swindon Town	A	0 - 2		4,701	6th
11 March 2000	Walsall	H	1 - 1	Smith [78]	12,424	6th
18 March 2000	West Bromwich Albion	A	1 - 0	Smith [22]	15,484	6th
21 March 2000	Nottingham Forest	H	2 - 1	Beech [27], Holland [56]	12,893	6th
25 March 2000	Crewe Alexandra	H	3 - 0	Gray [14], Beech [53, 79]	14,014	5th
1 April 2000	Grimsby Town	A	0 - 0		6,993	6th
8 April 2000	Birmingham City	H	0 - 0		16,961	6th
14 April 2000	Charlton Athletic	A	1 - 0	Wijnhard [25]	19,739	5th
22 April 2000	Bolton Wanderers	H	0 - 3		16,404	6th
24 April 2000	Port Vale	A	2 - 1	Vincent [8], Irons [54 (pen)]	5,828	6th
29 April 2000	Stockport County	H	0 - 2		14,046	6th
7 May 2000	Fulham	A	0 - 3		13,728	8th

=== FA Cup ===
Date	Round	Opponents	Home/ Away	Result F - A	Scorers	Attendance
12 December 1999	Third round	Liverpool	H	0–2		23,678

=== League Cup ===
Date	Round	Opponents	Home/ Away	Result F - A	Scorers	Attendance
10 August 1999	First round first Leg	Scunthorpe United	A	2–0	Lucketti [41], Beech [80]	3,398
24 August 1999	First round second Leg	Scunthorpe United	H	0–0		4,345: Huddersfield won 2–0 on aggregate
14 September 1999	Second round first Leg	Notts County	H	2–1	Wijnhard [17], Stewart [58]	6,900
21 September 1999	Second round second Leg	Notts County	A	2–2	Irons [19], Gorré [30]	4,414: Huddersfield won 4–3 on aggregate
13 October 1999	Third round	Chelsea	A	1–0	Irons [77]	20,008
30 November 1999	Fourth round	Wimbledon	H	1–2 (aet: 90 mins: 1–1)	Sellars [40]	13,312

== Appearances and goals ==
Squad No.	Name	Nationality	Position	League		FA Cup		League Cup		Total	
Squad No.	Name	Nationality	Position	Apps	Goals	Apps	Goals	Apps	Goals	Apps	Goals
1	Nico Vaesen	Belgium	GK	46	0	1	0	6	0	53	0
2	Steve Jenkins	Wales	DF	33	0	1	0	2	0	36	0
3	Jamie Vincent	England	DF	33 (3)	2	1	0	1 (2)	0	35 (5)	2
4	Craig Armstrong	England	MF	37 (2)	0	1	0	5 (1)	0	43 (3)	0
5	Chris Lucketti	England	DF	26	0	0	0	5	1	31	1
6	Kevin Gray	England	DF	16 (2)	2	1	0	2	0	19 (2)	2
7	Georgios Donis	Greece	MF	10 (10)	0	0 (1)	0	3 (1)	0	13 (12)	0
8	Kenny Irons	England	MF	39	3	1	0	6	2	46	5
9	Martin Smith	England	FW	10 (2)	4	0	0	0	0	10 (2)	4
9	Marcus Stewart	England	FW	29	14	1	0	6	1	36	15
10	Scott Sellars	England	MF	23 (11)	1	1	0	1 (1)	1	25 (12)	2
11	Clyde Wijnhard	Suriname	FW	45	15	1	0	6	1	52	16
12	Ben Thornley	England	MF	16 (12)	1	1	0	4	0	21 (12)	1
14	Alun Armstrong	England	FW	4 (3)	0	0	0	0	0	4 (3)	0
14	Barry Horne	Wales	MF	6 (8)	0	0	0	3	0	9 (8)	0
15	Rob Edwards	England	MF	1 (8)	1	0	0	2	0	3 (8)	1
16	Delroy Facey	Grenada	FW	0 (2)	0	0	0	0	0	0 (2)	0
17	Simon Baldry	England	MF	5 (14)	1	0	0	0 (2)	0	5 (16)	1
18	Darren Edmondson	England	DF	2 (3)	0	0	0	0	0	2 (3)	0
18	Chris Hay	Scotland	FW	2 (5)	0	0	0	0	0	2 (5)	0
19	David Beresford	England	MF	0	0	0	0	0 (1)	0	0 (1)	0
20	Wayne Allison	England	FW	0 (3)	0	0	0	0 (1)	0	0 (4)	0
20	Thomas Heary	Republic of Ireland	DF	1	0	0	0	0	0	1	0
21	Jon Dyson	England	DF	22 (6)	2	0	0	2 (2)	0	24 (8)	2
22	Chris Beech	England	MF	34 (1)	9	0	0	4	1	38 (1)	10
23	Chris Holland	England	MF	16 (1)	1	0	0	0	0	16 (1)	1
24	Danny Schofield	England	MF	0 (2)	0	0 (1)	0	0 (1)	0	0 (4)	0
34	Michael Senior	England	MF	0	0	0	0	0 (1)	0	0 (1)	0
35	David May	England	DF	1	0	0	0	0	0	1	0
36	Kwami Hodouto	Togo	DF	1 (1)	0	0	0	1	0	2 (1)	0
36	Michel Ngonge	Belgium	FW	0 (4)	0	0	0	0	0	0 (4)	0
37	Steve Baker	England	DF	3	0	0	0	0	0	3	0
38	Ken Monkou	Suriname	DF	19	1	0	0	4	0	23	1
40	Dean Gorré	Suriname	MF	26 (2)	4	1	0	3	1	30 (2)	5
