= 2000–01 Huddersfield Town A.F.C. season =

Huddersfield Town
2000–01 season
- Chairman: Barry Rubery
- Manager: Steve Bruce (until 16 October 2000); Lou Macari (from 16 October 2000)
- Stadium: Kirklees Stadium
- Division One: 22nd (relegated)
- FA Cup: Third round (eliminated by Bristol City)
- League Cup: First round (eliminated by Oldham Athletic)
- Top goalscorer: League: Delroy Facey; Kevin Gallen (10 each); All: Delroy Facey; Kevin Gallen (10 each)
- Highest home attendance: 19,290 vs Birmingham City (6 May 2001)
- Lowest home attendance: 4,979 vs Oldham Athletic (5 September 2000)
- Biggest win: 3–0 vs Wolverhampton Wanderers (9 December 2000); 3–0 vs Tranmere Rovers (26 December 2000); 4–1 vs Portsmouth (31 March 2001)
- Biggest defeat: 0–3 vs Sheffield United (17 October 2000); 0–3 vs Fulham (4 November 2000)
Home colours	Away colours

Huddersfield Town's 2000–01 campaign was their last competitive campaign in the second tier of English football, up until Town's return in the 2012–13 season. Huddersfield finished 22nd following a disastrous final day in which Town lost at home to Birmingham City, while their rivals Stockport County, Portsmouth & Crystal Palace all got their necessary results which sent Town down.

== Squad at the start of the season ==
Note: Flags indicate national team as defined under FIFA eligibility rules; some limited exceptions apply. Players may hold more than one non-FIFA nationality.

No.	Pos.	Nation	Player
1	GK	BEL	Nico Vaesen
2	DF	WAL	Steve Jenkins
3	DF	ENG	Jamie Vincent
4	DF	ENG	Craig Armstrong
5	DF	ENG	Chris Lucketti
6	DF	SUR	Ken Monkou
7	MF	ENG	Ben Thornley
8	MF	ENG	Kenny Irons
9	FW	ENG	Martin Smith
10	MF	SUR	Dean Gorré
11	FW	SUR	Clyde Wijnhard
12	DF	ENG	Kevin Gray

No.	Pos.	Nation	Player
13	GK	WAL	Martyn Margetson
14	MF	ENG	Scott Sellars
16	FW	GRN	Delroy Facey
17	MF	ENG	Simon Baldry
18	FW	SCO	Chris Hay
19	MF	ENG	David Beresford
20	DF	IRL	Thomas Heary
21	DF	ENG	Jon Dyson
22	MF	ENG	Chris Beech
23	MF	ENG	Chris Holland
25	FW	ENG	Kevin Gallen

== Review ==
The optimism that had surrounded the club just a year earlier had completely dissipated and manager Bruce's ability to turn the tide was seriously in doubt given the side's finish to the previous season. After some less than inspiring signings, among them Kevin Gallen, Huddersfield made a horrific start to the season, winning only one of their first 19 games, (a 3–2 win over Sheffield Wednesday at Hillsborough Stadium) which saw Steve Bruce lose his job in October after Town went to the bottom of the table following a 1–0 loss to Grimsby Town. Lou Macari, the former Stoke City, Birmingham City, West Ham United and Celtic manager, took over immediately, but results didn't improve. Then in December, a miracle occurred, the loan signing of Zimbabwean international Peter Ndlovu dramatically improved Town's fortunes. They won five out of seven games in December and drew the other two, which brought Macari the Manager of the Month award for December 2000 and helped push the Terriers out of the bottom three. Many thought that a repeat of "The Great Escape" three seasons ago was on the cards again.

However, Town's old manager Warnock (Crystal Palace) snapped Ndlovu up before a permanent deal could be agreed. Then a run of seven games without a win in January and February saw Town slide into trouble again, but Macari pulled a joker from the pack and signed the irreplaceable legend Andy Booth for £200,000 from Sheffield Wednesday. He scored on his debut in a 4–1 win against Portsmouth, but following defeats to promotion chasing Fulham and Blackburn Rovers, Town were in trouble again.

Their next game was against Queens Park Rangers. The Terriers won the game 2–1, which saw QPR relegated along with Tranmere Rovers, but then draws against Wimbledon and West Bromwich Albion saw Town in trouble on the final day. Town needed a win to guarantee 1st Division football, but a disputed goal for Crystal Palace combined with Town's 2–1 defeat by Birmingham City saw Town back down to Division 2.

== Squad at the end of the season ==
Note: Flags indicate national team as defined under FIFA eligibility rules; some limited exceptions apply. Players may hold more than one non-FIFA nationality.

No.	Pos.	Nation	Player
1	GK	BEL	Nico Vaesen
2	DF	WAL	Steve Jenkins
4	DF	ENG	Craig Armstrong
5	DF	ENG	Chris Lucketti
7	MF	ENG	Ben Thornley
8	MF	ENG	Kenny Irons
9	FW	ENG	Martin Smith
10	MF	SUR	Dean Gorré
11	FW	SUR	Clyde Wijnhard
12	DF	ENG	Kevin Gray
13	GK	WAL	Martyn Margetson
14	MF	ENG	Scott Sellars

No.	Pos.	Nation	Player
16	FW	GRN	Delroy Facey
17	MF	ENG	Simon Baldry
18	FW	SCO	Chris Hay
19	MF	ENG	David Beresford
20	DF	IRL	Thomas Heary
21	DF	ENG	Jon Dyson
22	MF	ENG	Chris Beech
23	MF	ENG	Chris Holland
25	FW	ENG	Kevin Gallen
26	DF	ENG	Adie Moses
32	FW	ENG	Andy Booth

== Results ==
=== Division One ===
Date	Opponents	Home/ Away	Result F - A	Scorers	Attendance	Position
12 August 2000	Watford	H	1 - 2	Palmer [16 (og)]	13,018	17th
19 August 2000	Sheffield Wednesday	A	3 - 2	Smith [6, 39], Gallen [35]	22,704	10th
26 August 2000	Crystal Palace	H	1 - 2	Lucketti [25]	10,670	17th
28 August 2000	Stockport County	A	0 - 0		6,137	16th
9 September 2000	Bolton Wanderers	H	2 - 3	Smith [47], Dyson [76]	12,248	21st
12 September 2000	Wimbledon	H	0 - 2		7,592	23rd
16 September 2000	Gillingham	A	1 - 2	Gallen [26]	8,503	24th
23 September 2000	Burnley	H	0 - 1		14,016	24th
30 September 2000	Norwich City	A	1 - 1	Gallen [58]	14,499	22nd
6 October 2000	Barnsley	H	1 - 1	Smith [80]	13,556	22nd
14 October 2000	Grimsby Town	A	0 - 1		4,911	23rd
17 October 2000	Sheffield United	A	0 - 3		14,062	23rd
21 October 2000	Preston North End	H	0 - 0		13,161	23rd
24 October 2000	Crewe Alexandra	A	0 - 1		5,215	24th
28 October 2000	Blackburn Rovers	H	0 - 1		12,287	24th
4 November 2000	Fulham	A	0 - 3		13,108	24th
11 November 2000	West Bromwich Albion	H	0 - 2		11,801	24th
18 November 2000	Queens Park Rangers	A	1 - 1	Gallen [8]	11,543	24th
25 November 2000	Birmingham City	A	1 - 2	Armstrong [61]	22,120	24th
2 December 2000	Crewe Alexandra	H	3 - 1	Baldry [46], Smith [62], Gallen [68]	10,603	24th
9 December 2000	Wolverhampton Wanderers	H	3 - 0	Ndlovu [49, 90], Facey [86]	11,506	24th
13 December 2000	Nottingham Forest	A	3 - 1	Ndlovu [57], Gallen [61, 65]	28,372	23rd
16 December 2000	Portsmouth	A	1 - 1	Dyson [40]	12,041	24th
23 December 2000	Watford	A	2 - 1	Ndlovu [29], Facey [60]	13,371	23rd
26 December 2000	Tranmere Rovers	H	3 - 0	Facey [44], Dyson [65], Gallen [71]	12,397	19th
30 December 2000	Sheffield Wednesday	H	0 - 0		18,931	19th
13 January 2001	Stockport County	H	0 - 0		10,988	19th
3 February 2001	Nottingham Forest	H	1 - 1	Facey [45]	13,838	21st
10 February 2001	Bolton Wanderers	A	2 - 2	Smith [6], Gallen [23]	14,866	21st
17 February 2001	Gillingham	H	2 - 3	Armstrong [16], Smith [45 (pen)]	10,576	23rd
24 February 2001	Burnley	A	0 - 1		16,191	23rd
27 February 2001	Tranmere Rovers	A	0 - 2		10,621	24th
3 March 2001	Norwich City	H	2 - 0	Armstrong [8], Facey [71]	11,122	23rd
6 March 2001	Grimsby Town	H	0 - 0		9,494	22nd
10 March 2001	Barnsley	A	1 - 3	Morris [10]	15,290	23rd
17 March 2001	Sheffield United	H	2 - 1	Smith [25], Facey [78]	13,918	22nd
31 March 2001	Portsmouth	H	4 - 1	Booth [56], Facey [71], Gorré [89 (pen)], Baldry [90]	13,199	22nd
3 April 2001	Crystal Palace	A	0 - 0		15,324	22nd
7 April 2001	Wolverhampton Wanderers	A	1 - 0	Facey [10]	19,423	21st
10 April 2001	Preston North End	A	0 - 0		15,185	19th
14 April 2001	Fulham	H	1 - 2	Facey [78]	15,882	21st
16 April 2001	Blackburn Rovers	A	0 - 2		29,426	21st
21 April 2001	Queens Park Rangers	H	2 - 1	Gorré [33], Facey [90]	12,846	20th
28 April 2001	West Bromwich Albion	A	1 - 1	Booth [7]	17,542	20th
1 May 2001	Wimbledon	A	1 - 1	Gallen [74]	4,956	20th
6 May 2001	Birmingham City	H	1 - 2	Booth [45]	19,290	22nd

=== FA Cup ===
Date	Round	Opponents	Home/ Away	Result F - A	Scorers	Attendance
6 January 2001	Round 3	Bristol City	H	0 - 2		9,192

=== Worthington Cup ===
Date	Round	Opponents	Home/ Away	Result F - A	Scorers	Attendance
22 August 2000	Round 1 1st Leg	Oldham Athletic	A	0 - 1		4,255
5 September 2000	Round 1 2nd Leg	Oldham Athletic	H	0 - 2		4,979: Huddersfield lose 3–0 on aggregate

== Appearances and goals ==
Squad No.	Name	Nationality	Position	League		FA Cup		League Cup		Total	
Squad No.	Name	Nationality	Position	Apps	Goals	Apps	Goals	Apps	Goals	Apps	Goals
1	Nico Vaesen	Belgium	GK	45	0	1	0	2	0	48	0
2	Steve Jenkins	Wales	DF	30	0	0	0	0	0	30	0
3	Jamie Vincent	England	DF	14 (2)	0	1	0	2	0	17 (2)	0
4	Craig Armstrong	England	MF	44	3	1	0	1	0	46	3
5	Chris Lucketti	England	DF	40	1	0	0	2	0	42	1
6	Ken Monkou	Suriname	DF	2	0	0	0	0	0	2	0
7	Ben Thornley	England	MF	29 (7)	0	1	0	2	0	32 (7)	0
8	Kenny Irons	England	MF	18 (15)	0	0	0	1	0	19 (15)	0
9	Martin Smith	England	FW	27 (3)	8	0	0	1	0	28 (3)	8
10	Dean Gorré	Suriname	MF	23 (11)	2	0 (1)	0	1	0	24 (12)	2
11	Clyde Wijnhard	Suriname	FW	4	0	0	0	1	0	5	0
12	Kevin Gray	England	DF	13 (4)	0	1	0	0	0	14 (4)	0
13	Martyn Margetson	Wales	GK	1 (1)	0	0	0	0	0	1 (1)	0
14	Jim Brennan	Canada	MF	0 (2)	0	0	0	0	0	0 (2)	0
14	Scott Sellars	England	MF	6 (8)	0	0 (1)	0	0 (1)	0	6 (10)	0
15	Kevin Kyle	Scotland	FW	0 (4)	0	0	0	0	0	0 (4)	0
15	Peter Ndlovu	Zimbabwe	MF	6	4	0	0	0	0	6	4
15	Lee Morris	England	FW	5	1	0	0	0	0	5	1
16	Delroy Facey	Grenada	FW	22 (12)	10	1	0	1 (1)	0	24 (13)	10
17	Simon Baldry	England	MF	26 (9)	2	1	0	0 (2)	0	27 (11)	2
18	Chris Hay	Scotland	FW	0 (4)	0	0	0	2	0	2 (4)	0
19	David Beresford	England	MF	0 (2)	0	0	0	1	0	1 (2)	0
20	Thomas Heary	Republic of Ireland	DF	25 (3)	0	1	0	2	0	28 (3)	0
21	Jon Dyson	England	DF	25 (5)	3	1	0	1	0	27 (5)	3
22	Chris Beech	England	MF	10	0	0	0	1	0	11	0
23	Chris Holland	England	MF	29	0	1	0	1	0	31	0
24	Danny Schofield	England	MF	0 (1)	0	0	0	0	0	0 (1)	0
25	Kevin Gallen	England	FW	30 (8)	10	1	0	0	0	31 (8)	10
26	Rob Kozluk	England	DF	14	0	0	0	0	0	14	0
26	Adie Moses	England	DF	10 (2)	0	0	0	0	0	10 (2)	0
32	Andy Booth	England	FW	8	3	0	0	0	0	8	3
34	Michael Senior	England	MF	0 (4)	0	0	0	0	0	0 (4)	0
