= 1998–99 Huddersfield Town A.F.C. season =

Huddersfield Town
1998–99 season
- Chairman: Barry Rubery
- Manager: Peter Jackson
- Stadium: Kirklees Stadium
- Division One: 10th
- FA Cup: Fifth round (eliminated by Derby County)
- League Cup: Second round (eliminated by Everton)
- Top goalscorer: League: Marcus Stewart (22); All: Marcus Stewart (26)
- Highest home attendance: 21,629 vs Derby County (13 February 1999)
- Lowest home attendance: 3,988 vs Mansfield Town (11 August 1998)
- Biggest win: 4–0 vs Crystal Palace (5 December 1998)
- Biggest defeat: 1–7 vs Barnsley (27 November 1998)
| Home colours | Away colours |

Huddersfield Town's 1998–99 campaign was Town's full season with Peter Jackson at the helm. At the end of the season, Town finished a respectable 10th place, but within a day of the end of the season, owner Barry Rubery sacked Peter Jackson to the shock of just about every Huddersfield Town fan.

== Squad at the start of the season ==
Note: Flags indicate national team as defined under FIFA eligibility rules; some limited exceptions apply. Players may hold more than one non-FIFA nationality.

| No. | Pos. | Nation | Player |
|---|---|---|---|
| -- | GK | ENG | Steve Francis |
| -- | GK | BEL | Nico Vaesen |
| -- | DF | ENG | Sam Collins |
| -- | DF | SCO | Tom Cowan |
| -- | DF | ENG | Jon Dyson |
| -- | DF | ENG | Darren Edmondson |
| -- | DF | ENG | Rob Edwards |
| -- | DF | ENG | Kevin Gray |
| -- | DF | IRL | Thomas Heary |
| -- | DF | ENG | Sean Hessey |
| -- | DF | WAL | Steve Jenkins |
| -- | DF | SCO | Andy Morrison |
| -- | MF | ENG | Simon Baldry |

| No. | Pos. | Nation | Player |
|---|---|---|---|
| -- | MF | ENG | David Beresford |
| -- | MF | WAL | Marcus Browning |
| -- | MF | ENG | Paul Dalton |
| -- | MF | WAL | Barry Horne |
| -- | MF | SCO | Grant Johnson |
| -- | MF | WAL | David Phillips |
| -- | MF | ENG | Lee Richardson |
| -- | MF | ENG | Ben Thornley |
| -- | FW | ENG | Wayne Allison |
| -- | FW | ENG | Paul Barnes |
| -- | FW | GRN | Delroy Facey |
| -- | FW | ENG | Ian Lawson |
| -- | FW | ENG | Marcus Stewart |

== Review ==
Among the summer transfers brought in by manager Peter Jackson was Belgian goalkeeper Nico Vaesen, who was sent off on his debut after just 9 minutes against Bury, but after that made some exceptional performances in the Town net, which helped Town reach top spot in September and October. During that time, Town played Sunderland, which at the time saw a record 20,241 at a match at the McAlpine Stadium. (That would be eclipsed by the 21,629 that saw Town play Derby County in the FA Cup fifth round in February.)

Jackson recruited winger Ben Thornley (a popular loan signing under Horton) from Manchester United and in September, they beat Tranmere Rovers to top the early Division 1 table, thanks chiefly to the goalscoring prowess of Stewart and Allison.

Even though Town were top of the table, their away form was very mediocre at best. This was probably proven by their 7–1 loss to Barnsley in November (They were 6–0 down at half-time) Town did however have a good run in the FA Cup which culminated in a 5th-round match against Premier League side Derby County. They eventually lost 3–1 in the replay at Pride Park.

The team attracted the attention of local businessman Barry Rubery and, after protracted takeover talks, he took over the running of the club promising significant investment as the club sought Premiership status. The takeover rumours had a negative effect on the side and they fell away from the promotion race despite Jackson investing in the likes of Craig Armstrong and Jamie Vincent. A play-off place eventually faded following a horrible end to the season, which saw them win only one of their last 11 matches, although that was a 3–2 win against local rivals Bradford City at Valley Parade.

Jackson was hoping to mount a promotion challenge the following season, but he was suddenly sacked after the end of the season and replaced by former Manchester United captain Steve Bruce, whose first season in management with Sheffield United had brought little success. Jackson declined the role of academy director.

== Squad at the end of the season ==
Note: Flags indicate national team as defined under FIFA eligibility rules; some limited exceptions apply. Players may hold more than one non-FIFA nationality.

| No. | Pos. | Nation | Player |
|---|---|---|---|
| -- | GK | ENG | Phil Senior |
| -- | GK | BEL | Nico Vaesen |
| -- | DF | ENG | Sam Collins |
| -- | DF | ENG | Jon Dyson |
| -- | DF | ENG | Darren Edmondson |
| -- | DF | ENG | Rob Edwards |
| -- | DF | ENG | Kevin Gray |
| -- | DF | IRL | Thomas Heary |
| -- | DF | WAL | Steve Jenkins |
| -- | DF | ENG | Jamie Vincent |
| -- | MF | ENG | Craig Armstrong |
| -- | MF | ENG | Simon Baldry |
| -- | MF | ENG | Chris Beech |

| No. | Pos. | Nation | Player |
|---|---|---|---|
| -- | MF | ENG | David Beresford |
| -- | MF | ENG | Paul Dalton |
| -- | MF | WAL | Barry Horne |
| -- | MF | SCO | Grant Johnson |
| -- | MF | IRL | Dwayne Mattis |
| -- | MF | ENG | Lee Richardson |
| -- | MF | ENG | Ben Thornley |
| -- | FW | ENG | Wayne Allison |
| -- | FW | GRN | Delroy Facey |
| -- | FW | ENG | Ian Lawson |
| -- | FW | ENG | Danny Schofield |
| -- | FW | ENG | Marcus Stewart |

== Results ==
=== Division One ===
| Date | Opponents | Home/ Away | Result F - A | Scorers | Attendance | Position |
|---|---|---|---|---|---|---|
| 8 August 1998 | Bury | A | 0 - 1 | | 7,659 | 21st |
| 15 August 1998 | Port Vale | H | 2 - 1 | Dalton [40], Stewart [60] | 9,930 | 11th |
| 22 August 1998 | Grimsby Town | A | 0 - 1 | | 6,974 | 14th |
| 29 August 1998 | Portsmouth | H | 3 - 3 | Stewart [45, 84], Allison [89] | 10,085 | 13th |
| 31 August 1998 | Bristol City | A | 2 - 1 | Horne [48], Stewart [52] | 11,801 | 10th |
| 5 September 1998 | Sheffield United | H | 1 - 0 | Allison [88] | 12,192 | 6th |
| 8 September 1998 | Watford | H | 2 - 0 | Stewart [21], Allison [41] | 9,811 | 5th |
| 11 September 1998 | Tranmere Rovers | A | 3 - 2 | Stewart [21], Allison [45, 69] | 5,770 | 1st |
| 19 September 1998 | Wolverhampton Wanderers | H | 2 - 1 | Dalton [19], Thornley [90] | 13,854 | 1st |
| 26 September 1998 | Bolton Wanderers | A | 0 - 3 | | 20,971 | 2nd |
| 29 September 1998 | Stockport County | A | 1 - 1 | Allison [40] | 8,023 | 2nd |
| 3 October 1998 | Oxford United | H | 2 - 0 | Dalton [24], Stewart [33] | 10,968 | 1st |
| 9 October 1998 | Swindon Town | A | 0 - 3 | | 8,316 | 1st |
| 17 October 1998 | Queens Park Rangers | H | 2 - 0 | Edwards [12], Thornley [48] | 11,276 | 1st |
| 21 October 1998 | Sunderland | H | 1 - 1 | Stewart [28] | 20,241 | 1st |
| 24 October 1998 | Norwich City | A | 1 - 4 | Beresford [59] | 15,403 | 2nd |
| 31 October 1998 | Birmingham City | A | 1 - 1 | Stewart [61] | 14,468 | 3rd |
| 7 November 1998 | Ipswich Town | H | 2 - 2 | Edwards [65], Allison [74] | 14,240 | 5th |
| 14 November 1998 | West Bromwich Albion | A | 1 - 3 | Beresford [6] | 13,626 | 9th |
| 21 November 1998 | Bradford City | H | 2 - 1 | Barnes [70], Johnson [72] | 18,173 | 6th |
| 27 November 1998 | Barnsley | A | 1 - 7 | Facey [74] | 16,648 | 7th |
| 5 December 1998 | Crystal Palace | H | 4 - 0 | Stewart [15, 24, 81], Facey [90] | 10,453 | 6th |
| 12 December 1998 | West Bromwich Albion | H | 0 - 3 | | 11,947 | 8th |
| 19 December 1998 | Crewe Alexandra | A | 2 - 1 | Stewart [13, 48] | 5,102 | 8th |
| 26 December 1998 | Grimsby Town | H | 2 - 0 | Stewart [53], Beech [65] | 16,186 | 6th |
| 28 December 1998 | Sheffield United | A | 1 - 2 | Stewart [67 (pen)] | 17,359 | 7th |
| 9 January 1999 | Bury | H | 2 - 2 | Allison [32], Johnson [83] | 10,788 | 8th |
| 16 January 1999 | Portsmouth | A | 0 - 1 | | 10,334 | 10th |
| 30 January 1999 | Bristol City | H | 2 - 2 | Phillips [3], Johnson [59] | 13,934 | 10th |
| 6 February 1999 | Port Vale | A | 0 - 2 | | 6,499 | 11th |
| 16 February 1999 | Watford | A | 1 - 1 | Beech [71] | 10,303 | 11th |
| 20 February 1999 | Tranmere Rovers | H | 0 - 0 | | 11,411 | 12th |
| 27 February 1999 | Wolverhampton Wanderers | A | 2 - 2 | Gray [59], Hamilton [90] | 21,778 | 12th |
| 2 March 1999 | Bolton Wanderers | H | 3 - 2 | Stewart [36], Johnson [41], Armstrong [46] | 13,867 | 8th |
| 6 March 1999 | Stockport County | H | 3 - 0 | Stewart [64 (pen), 68], Jenkins [72] | 11,914 | 8th |
| 9 March 1999 | Oxford United | A | 2 - 2 | Thornley [29], Stewart [86 (pen)] | 6,034 | 7th |
| 13 March 1999 | Ipswich Town | A | 0 - 3 | | 17,170 | 10th |
| 20 March 1999 | Birmingham City | H | 1 - 1 | Facey [55] | 14,667 | 9th |
| 24 March 1999 | Norwich City | H | 1 - 1 | Hughes [83 (og)] | 9,717 | 8th |
| 3 April 1999 | Queens Park Rangers | A | 1 - 1 | Lawson [79] | 11,113 | 9th |
| 5 April 1999 | Swindon Town | H | 1 - 2 | Lawson [80] | 11,719 | 9th |
| 10 April 1999 | Sunderland | A | 0 - 2 | | 41,074 | 10th |
| 17 April 1999 | Bradford City | A | 3 - 2 | Stewart [22], Allison [24], Thornley [36] | 15,124 | 9th |
| 24 April 1999 | Barnsley | H | 0 - 1 | | 15,353 | 10th |
| 1 May 1999 | Crystal Palace | A | 2 - 2 | Dyson [33], Stewart [40 (pen)] | 17,282 | 10th |
| 9 May 1999 | Crewe Alexandra | H | 0 - 0 | | 15,105 | 10th |

=== FA Cup ===
| Date | Round | Opponents | Home/ Away | Result F - A | Scorers | Attendance |
|---|---|---|---|---|---|---|
| 2 January 1999 | Round 3 | Queens Park Rangers | A | 1 - 0 | Allison [42] | 11,685 |
| 23 January 1999 | Round 4 | Wrexham | A | 1 - 1 | Allison [22] | 8,714 |
| 3 February 1999 | Round 4 replay | Wrexham | H | 2 - 1 | Stewart [20], Thornley [28] | 15,427 |
| 13 February 1999 | Round 5 | Derby County | H | 2 - 2 | Beech [42], Stewart [71] | 21,629 |
| 24 February 1999 | Round 5 replay | Derby County | A | 1 - 3 | Beech [15] | 28,704 |

=== League Cup ===
| Date | Round | Opponents | Home/ Away | Result F - A | Scorers | Attendance |
|---|---|---|---|---|---|---|
| 11 August 1998 | Round 1 1st Leg | Mansfield Town | H | 3 - 2 | Johnson [18], Allison [74], Dalton [81 (pen)] | 3,988 |
| 18 August 1998 | Round 1 2nd Leg | Mansfield Town | A | 1 - 1 | Stewart [28] | 2,936: Huddersfield won 4–3 on aggregate |
| 15 September 1998 | Round 2 1st Leg | Everton | H | 1 - 1 | Allison [45] | 15,395 |
| 23 September 1998 | Round 2 2nd Leg | Everton | A | 1 - 2 | Stewart [1] | 18,718: Huddersfield lost 3–2 on aggregate |

== Appearances and goals ==
| Name | Nationality | Position | League | | FA Cup | | League Cup | | Total | |
| Name | Nationality | Position | Apps | Goals | Apps | Goals | Apps | Goals | Apps | Goals |
|---|---|---|---|---|---|---|---|---|---|---|
| Wayne Allison | England | FW | 44 | 9 | 4 | 2 | 3 | 2 | 51 | 13 |
| Craig Armstrong | England | MF | 13 | 1 | 0 | 0 | 0 | 0 | 13 | 1 |
| Simon Baldry | England | MF | 8 (5) | 0 | 1 (1) | 0 | 0 | 0 | 9 (6) | 0 |
| Paul Barnes | England | FW | 2 (13) | 1 | 1 (1) | 0 | 0 (3) | 0 | 3 (17) | 1 |
| Chris Beech | England | MF | 13 (4) | 2 | 2 | 2 | 0 | 0 | 15 (4) | 4 |
| David Beresford | England | MF | 13 (6) | 2 | 1 (1) | 0 | 0 (2) | 0 | 14 (9) | 2 |
| Marcus Browning | Wales | MF | 2 (4) | 0 | 0 | 0 | 1 (2) | 0 | 3 (6) | 0 |
| Sam Collins | England | DF | 22 (1) | 0 | 3 | 0 | 4 | 0 | 29 (1) | 0 |
| Tom Cowan | Scotland | DF | 5 | 0 | 2 | 0 | 0 | 0 | 7 | 0 |
| Paul Dalton | England | MF | 7 (2) | 3 | 0 | 0 | 3 (1) | 1 | 10 (3) | 4 |
| Jon Dyson | England | DF | 10 (4) | 1 | 2 | 0 | 0 | 0 | 12 (4) | 1 |
| Darren Edmondson | England | DF | 1 (2) | 0 | 2 (1) | 0 | 0 | 0 | 3 (3) | 0 |
| Rob Edwards | England | MF | 45 | 2 | 5 | 0 | 4 | 0 | 54 | 2 |
| Delroy Facey | Grenada | FW | 5 (15) | 3 | 0 (2) | 0 | 0 | 0 | 5 (17) | 3 |
| Steve Francis | England | GK | 3 | 0 | 0 | 0 | 0 | 0 | 3 | 0 |
| Kevin Gray | England | DF | 28 (6) | 1 | 5 | 0 | 2 (1) | 0 | 35 (7) | 1 |
| Des Hamilton | England | MF | 10 | 1 | 0 | 0 | 0 | 0 | 10 | 1 |
| Thomas Heary | Republic of Ireland | DF | 3 | 0 | 0 | 0 | 0 | 0 | 3 | 0 |
| Sean Hessey | England | DF | 7 (3) | 0 | 1 | 0 | 0 | 0 | 8 (3) | 0 |
| Barry Horne | Wales | MF | 20 | 1 | 0 | 0 | 4 | 0 | 24 | 1 |
| Mark Jackson | England | DF | 5 | 0 | 0 | 0 | 0 | 0 | 5 | 0 |
| Steve Jenkins | Wales | DF | 36 | 1 | 3 | 0 | 4 | 0 | 43 | 1 |
| Grant Johnson | Scotland | MF | 36 | 4 | 5 | 0 | 4 | 1 | 45 | 5 |
| Ian Lawson | England | FW | 2 (4) | 2 | 0 | 0 | 0 | 0 | 2 (4) | 2 |
| Dwayne Mattis | Republic of Ireland | MF | 0 (2) | 0 | 0 | 0 | 0 | 0 | 0 (2) | 0 |
| Andy Morrison | Scotland | DF | 12 | 0 | 0 | 0 | 3 | 0 | 15 | 0 |
| David Phillips | Wales | MF | 15 (8) | 1 | 5 | 0 | 0 | 0 | 20 (8) | 1 |
| Lee Richardson | England | MF | 13 (2) | 0 | 0 | 0 | 0 | 0 | 13 (2) | 0 |
| Danny Schofield | England | MF | 1 | 0 | 0 | 0 | 0 | 0 | 1 | 0 |
| Marcus Stewart | England | FW | 43 | 22 | 5 | 2 | 4 | 2 | 52 | 26 |
| Ben Thornley | England | MF | 32 (3) | 4 | 3 | 1 | 4 | 0 | 39 (3) | 5 |
| Nico Vaesen | Belgium | GK | 43 | 0 | 5 | 0 | 4 | 0 | 52 | 0 |
| Jamie Vincent | England | DF | 7 | 0 | 0 | 0 | 0 | 0 | 7 | 0 |
