= 1994–95 Oldham Athletic A.F.C. season =

Oldham Athletic
1994–95 season
- Chairman: Ian Stott
- Manager: Joe Royle (until 10 November); Graeme Sharp (from 16 November)
- Stadium: Boundary Park
- First Division: 14th
- FA Cup: Fourth round
- League Cup: Third round
- Top goalscorer: McCarthy (18)
- Highest home attendance: 11,962 vs. Wolverhampton Wanderers
- Lowest home attendance: 4,525 vs. Oxford United (League Cup)
- Average home league attendance: 8,444
Home colours	Away colours

During the 1994–95 English football season, Oldham Athletic A.F.C. competed in the Football League First Division.

== Season summary ==
When Joe Royle quit as Oldham manager to take over at Everton in November 1994, Sharp took over as player-manager at Boundary Park and they finished in midtable in the 1994–95 season – a disappointing showing for a side who had retained all but one of their key players (Mike Milligan) from the side that had been relegated from the Premier League and reached an FA Cup semi-final. Season highlights were a 3–1 win over local rivals Bolton Wanderers that ultimately cost their neighbours automatic promotion, a 4–1 hammering of promotion chasing Wolverhampton Wanderers on Boxing Day and a 1–0 victory over eventual champions Middlesbrough.

== Final league table ==
Pos	Team	Pld	W	D	L	GF	GA	GD	Pts
12	Millwall	46	16	14	16	60	60	0	62
13	Southend United	46	18	8	20	54	73	−19	62
14	Oldham Athletic	46	16	13	17	60	60	0	61
15	Charlton Athletic	46	16	11	19	58	66	−8	59
16	Luton Town	46	15	13	18	61	64	−3	58

Rules for classification: 1) Points; 2) Goals scored; 3) Goal difference

== Results ==
Oldham Athletic's score comes first

=== Legend ===
Win	Draw	Loss

=== Football League First Division ===
Date	Opponent	Venue	Result	Attendance	Scorers
13 August 1994	Charlton Athletic	H	5–2	8,924	McCarthy (2), Richardson (2), Sharp
20 August 1994	Port Vale	A	1–3	10,051	Sharp
27 August 1994	Burnley	H	3–0	11,310	Ritchie, McCarthy (2, 1 pen)
30 August 1994	Notts County	A	3–1	6,603	McCarthy (3)
3 September 1994	Southend United	A	0–1	4,435	
10 September 1994	Reading	H	1–3	8,412	Richardson
13 September 1994	Watford	H	0–2	7,043	
17 September 1994	Derby County	A	1–2	13,746	McCarthy (pen)
24 September 1994	Barnsley	H	1–0	7,941	Halle
1 October 1994	Sheffield United	A	0–2	14,223	
8 October 1994	Portsmouth	H	3–2	7,683	R Holden (2 pens), Graham
16 October 1994	Bolton Wanderers	A	2–2	11,106	Bernard, McCarthy
22 October 1994	Stoke City	H	0–0	8,954	
29 October 1994	Sunderland	A	0–0	17,252	
1 November 1994	Middlesbrough	A	1–2	15,929	Graham
6 November 1994	Tranmere Rovers	H	0–0	6,475	
12 November 1994	Luton Town	H	0–0	7,907	
19 November 1994	West Bromwich Albion	A	1–3	14,616	Halle (pen)
26 November 1994	Bristol City	H	2–0	7,277	Richardson, McCarthy
4 December 1994	Stoke City	A	1–0	12,558	McCarthy
10 December 1994	Port Vale	H	3–2	7,712	Ritchie (3)
17 December 1994	Charlton Athletic	A	0–2	8,970	
26 December 1994	Wolverhampton Wanderers	H	4–1	11,962	Ritchie (3), McCarthy
27 December 1994	Grimsby Town	A	3–1	6,958	Ritchie, Henry, McCarthy
31 December 1994	Swindon Town	H	1–1	8,917	Halle
3 January 1995	Millwall	A	1–1	7,438	Richardson (pen)
14 January 1995	Sunderland	H	0–0	9,742	
22 January 1995	Tranmere Rovers	A	1–3	5,581	Makin
4 February 1995	Luton Town	A	1–2	6,903	R Holden
18 February 1995	Bristol City	A	2–2	7,851	Halle, Ritchie
21 February 1995	West Bromwich Albion	H	1–0	7,690	Richardson
25 February 1995	Sheffield United	H	3–3	9,640	Banger (2), Ritchie
7 March 1995	Southend United	H	0–2	7,168	
11 March 1995	Burnley	A	1–2	11,620	McCarthy
14 March 1995	Notts County	H	1–1	5,465	Henry
21 March 1995	Reading	A	1–2	6,921	Halle
25 March 1995	Derby County	H	1–0	7,696	Graham
1 April 1995	Watford	A	2–1	8,090	Banger, Brennan
5 April 1995	Middlesbrough	H	1–0	11,024	Ritchie
8 April 1995	Swindon Town	A	1–3	7,488	Ritchie
15 April 1995	Grimsby Town	H	1–0	6,757	McCarthy
17 April 1995	Wolverhampton Wanderers	A	1–2	25,840	Bernard
22 April 1995	Millwall	H	0–1	6,319	
29 April 1995	Bolton Wanderers	H	3–1	11,901	McCarthy (2), Rickers
2 May 1995	Barnsley	A	1–1	9,838	Eyre
7 May 1995	Portsmouth	A	1–1	11,002	McCarthy (pen)

=== FA Cup ===
Round	Date	Opponent	Venue	Result	Attendance	Goalscorers
R3	7 January 1995	Reading	A	3–1	8,886	Sharp, Richardson, Halle
R4	28 January 1995	Leeds United	A	2–3	25,010	Halle 48', Palmer (o.g.) 60'

=== League Cup ===
Round	Date	Opponent	Venue	Result	Attendance	Goalscorers
R2 First Leg	20 September 1994	Oxford United	A	1–1	5,070	Ritchie
R2 Second Leg	4 October 1994	Oxford United	H	1–0 (won 2–1 on agg)	4,525	Richardson
R3	26 October 1994	Arsenal	H	0–0	9,303	
R3R	9 November 1994	Arsenal	A	0–2	22,746	

== Players ==
=== First-team squad ===
Squad at end of season

Note: Flags indicate national team as defined under FIFA eligibility rules; some limited exceptions apply. Players may hold more than one non-FIFA nationality.

No.	Pos.	Nation	Player
—	GK	ENG	Jon Hallworth
—	GK	ENG	Paul Gerrard
—	GK	ENG	Ian Gray
—	DF	NOR	Gunnar Halle
—	DF	ENG	Steve Redmond
—	DF	ENG	Craig Fleming
—	DF	ENG	Richard Jobson
—	DF	ENG	Richard Graham
—	DF	ENG	Chris Makin
—	DF	ENG	Simon Webster (on loan from West Ham United)
—	DF	ENG	Neil Moore (on loan from Everton)
—	DF	WAL	Andy Holden
—	DF	ENG	Martin Pemberton
—	DF	ENG	Andy Barlow
—	DF	ENG	Carl Serrant
—	DF	ENG	Neil Pointon

No.	Pos.	Nation	Player
—	MF	ENG	Nick Henry
—	MF	ENG	Paul Rickers
—	MF	SCO	Paul Bernard
—	MF	ENG	Lee Richardson
—	MF	ENG	Rick Holden
—	MF	ENG	David Beresford
—	MF	ENG	Mark Brennan
—	MF	ENG	Ian Snodin
—	MF	ENG	Billy Kenny
—	FW	ENG	Andy Ritchie
—	FW	WAL	Sean McCarthy
—	FW	SCO	Graeme Sharp (player-manager from 16 November)
—	FW	ENG	Nicky Banger
—	FW	ENG	Darren Beckford
—	FW	ENG	Ian Olney
—	FW	ENG	John Eyre
