= David Beresford =

English footballer (born 1976)

Personal information
- Full name: David Beresford
- Date of birth: 11 November 1976 (age 49)
- Place of birth: Middleton, Greater Manchester, England
- Height: 5 ft 5 in (1.65 m)
- Position: Midfielder

Youth career
- 1992–1993: Oldham Athletic

Senior career*
Years	Team	Apps	(Gls)
1993–1997	Oldham Athletic	64	(2)
1995	→ Swansea City (loan)	6	(0)
1997–2001	Huddersfield Town	35	(3)
1999–2000	→ Preston North End (loan)	4	(0)
2000	→ Port Vale (loan)	4	(0)
2001–2002	Hull City	41	(1)
2002–2003	Plymouth Argyle	17	(0)
2003	→ Macclesfield Town (loan)	5	(0)
2003–2005	Tranmere Rovers	44	(3)
2005–2006	Macclesfield Town	16	(0)
Total		236	(9)

International career
1992–1993	England U16	10	(0)
1994	England U17	1	(0)
1994–1995	England U18	5	(0)
- * Club domestic league appearances and goals

David Beresford (born 11 November 1976) is an English former footballer. A midfielder, he made 236 league appearances in a 12-year career in the Football League. He also won 14 caps for the England under-16s and under-18s.

Beresford began his career at Oldham Athletic, making 64 league appearances between 1994 and 1997, also playing briefly for Swansea City on a loan spell in 1995. He transferred to Huddersfield Town for a £350,000 fee in March but was riddled with injuries which were poorly dealt with at Galpharm Stadium. He enjoyed short loan spells at Preston North End and Port Vale before joining Hull City on a free transfer in June 2001. He switched to Plymouth Argyle in July 2002. Loaned out to Macclesfield Town in October 2003, he was allowed to join Tranmere Rovers the following month. He signed with Macclesfield Town in July 2005 before retiring the following year.

== Club career ==
Beresford began his career with Oldham Athletic after graduating at the Lilleshall National School of Football Excellence. He made his debut at Boundary Park in 1993–94 at the age of 17, just as the club suffered relegation out of the Premier League, in the last season in the reign of Joe Royle. They finished 14th in the First Division in 1994–95 under new boss Graeme Sharp, before finishing 18th in 1995–96. He was loaned out to Swansea City in 1995 and made six appearances for the struggling Second Division side. Beresford made 38 appearances in 1996–97, as the "Latics" suffered relegation. New manager Neil Warnock sold Beresford to Brian Horton's Huddersfield Town for a £350,000 fee in March 1997.

He featured six times in the remainder of 1996–97, as the "Terriers" retained their First Division status by holding on to 20th place. He played just nine times in 1997–98, falling completely out of the first-team picture after new boss Peter Jackson arrived at the Galpharm Stadium in October. He scored twice in 23 games in 1998–99 but became frozen out of the first-team picture completely with the arrival of Steve Bruce in 1999–2000. He was loaned out to Preston North End but only made two starts for the "Lambs", who went on to win the Second Division title under David Moyes. He still could not get a run in the Huddersfield team in 2000–01, despite the arrival of Lou Macari in October. He was loaned out to Port Vale for four weeks on 15 September, in a move that reunited him with former boss Brian Horton, but could only make four goalless Second Division appearances for the "Valiants".

He joined Brian Little's Hull City on a free transfer in June 2001. He played 47 games for the "Tigers", who posted an 11th-place finish in the Third Division, losing his first-team place when Jan Mølby was appointed manager in April. Beresford signed for Plymouth Argyle in July 2002. He made 16 appearances for Paul Sturrock's "Pilgrims" in 2002–03. His only contribution to the 2003–04 Second Division title-winning campaign was a late substitute appearance at the start of the season. He was loaned out to David Moss's Macclesfield Town in October 2003. He played five Third Division games at Moss Rose, before he joined Tranmere Rovers permanently the following month, in a move that reunited him with former boss Brian Little. His signing was announced a day after Macclesfield announced that they had extended his loan deal for a further four weeks. He played 31 games for the "Superwhites" in 2003–04, as the club missed out on the Second Division play-offs by two places and six points. He made just 24 appearances in 2004–05, but scored past Hartlepool United in the play-off semi-final second leg at Prenton Park, taking the game into extra time; he scored in the resulting penalty shoot-out, but Rovers were defeated 6–5 after Ian Sharps missed his sudden death penalty. This was to be his last appearance for the club, as Beresford was released at the end of the season. He joined Macclesfield Town in July 2005, signing for manager Brian Horton for a third time. He made just 12 starts for the League Two club, and departed at the end of the season.

== International career ==
Beresford won ten caps for the England under-16s between September 1992 and April 1993. He then went on to win five caps for the England under-18s between July 1994 and April 1995.

== Later career ==
In April 2025, Beresford was working as a PE teacher at Wardle Academy and as director of football at non-League club Saddleworth.

== Career statistics ==
Appearances and goals by club, season and competition
Club	Season	League			FA Cup		Other		Total	
Club	Season	Division	Apps	Goals	Apps	Goals	Apps	Goals	Apps	Goals
Oldham Athletic	1993–94	Premier League	1	0	0	0	0	0	1	0
Oldham Athletic	1994–95	First Division	2	0	0	0	0	0	2	0
Oldham Athletic	1995–96	First Division	28	2	0	0	5	0	33	2
Oldham Athletic	1996–97	First Division	33	0	1	0	4	0	38	0
Oldham Athletic	Total		64	2	1	0	9	0	74	2
Swansea City (loan)	1995–96	Second Division	6	0	0	0	0	0	6	0
Huddersfield Town	1996–97	First Division	6	1	0	0	0	0	6	1
Huddersfield Town	1997–98	First Division	8	0	0	0	1	0	9	0
Huddersfield Town	1998–99	First Division	19	2	2	0	2	0	23	2
Huddersfield Town	1999–2000	First Division	0	0	0	0	1	0	1	0
Huddersfield Town	2000–01	First Division	2	0	0	0	1	0	3	0
Huddersfield Town	Total		35	3	2	0	5	0	42	3
Preston North End (loan)	1999–2000	Second Division	4	0	1	0	1	0	6	0
Port Vale (loan)	2000–01	Second Division	4	0	0	0	0	0	4	0
Hull City	2001–02	Third Division	41	1	1	0	5	0	47	1
Plymouth Argyle	2002–03	Second Division	16	0	0	0	2	0	18	0
Plymouth Argyle	2003–04	Second Division	1	0	0	0	0	0	1	0
Plymouth Argyle	Total		17	0	0	0	2	0	19	0
Macclesfield Town (loan)	2003–04	Third Division	5	0	0	0	1	0	6	0
Tranmere Rovers	2003–04	Second Division	25	1	6	0	0	0	31	1
Tranmere Rovers	2004–05	League One	19	2	0	0	5	1	24	3
Tranmere Rovers	Total		44	3	6	0	5	1	55	4
Macclesfield Town	2005–06	League Two	16	0	2	0	4	1	22	1
Career total			236	9	13	0	32	2	281	11
