= Delroy Facey =

British-Grenadian footballer (born 1980)

Personal information
- Full name: Delroy Michael Facey
- Date of birth: 22 April 1980 (age 46)
- Place of birth: Huddersfield, Yorkshire, England
- Position: Striker

Youth career
- Huddersfield Town

Senior career*
Years	Team	Apps	(Gls)
1996–2002	Huddersfield Town	75	(15)
2002–2004	Bolton Wanderers	10	(2)
2002	→ Bradford City (loan)	6	(1)
2003	→ Burnley (loan)	14	(5)
2004	West Bromwich Albion	9	(0)
2004–2005	Hull City	21	(4)
2005	→ Huddersfield Town (loan)	4	(0)
2005	Oldham Athletic	9	(0)
2005–2006	Tranmere Rovers	37	(8)
2006–2007	Rotherham United	40	(10)
2007–2008	Gillingham	32	(3)
2008	→ Wycombe Wanderers (loan)	6	(1)
2008–2010	Notts County	63	(11)
2009–2010	→ Lincoln City (loan)	10	(1)
2010–2011	Lincoln City	32	(3)
2011–2012	Hereford United	40	(6)
2013–2015	Albion Sports		
Total		408	(70)

International career
2009–2011	Grenada	15	(2)
- * Club domestic league appearances and goals

Delroy Michael Facey (born 22 April 1980) is a British-Grenadian former professional footballer who played as a striker. In April 2015, Facey was jailed for 2 1/2 years for match fixing.

== Football career ==
=== Huddersfield Town ===
Born in Huddersfield, West Yorkshire, England, Facey began his career at Huddersfield Town, joined as an apprentice in April 1996 and turning professional in May 1997. He went on to become a first team regular, playing over fifty league games and getting fifteen goals. Facey broke into the first team during the 1998–99 season after beginning his career as a trainee with his hometown club. He made most of his appearances from the bench for the first team until Lou Macari handed him his chance in December 2000. He earned an extended run in the side and scored 10 goals in 21 full starts and one as a substitute to finish the 2000–01 campaign as joint top-scorer alongside Kevin Gallen. Facey went on to make an extra 15 league appearances for Huddersfield in the 2001–02 season, before leaving the club to join Premier League side Bolton Wanderers.

=== Bolton Wanderers ===
On 19 June 2002, Facey agreed a two-year contract to join Bolton Wanderers. As Facey was under the age of 24, then, under the Bosman ruling, Huddersfield were entitled to compensation for him; a tribunal held on 15 August 2002 decided that Bolton Wanderers should pay an initial £100,000 for Facey plus £50,000 for every five games, up to a maximum of 25 games, that he played for the club with the club also receiving a sell on clause of 15% of any fee that Bolton could receive for him.

After playing him in ten matches in the Premier League for Bolton (scoring twice), Allardyce decided that the young centre-forward was not yet ready for first team football and so sent him out on loan to Bradford City (where he scored on his debut against Wimbledon) and then Burnley during the 2002–03 season. Whilst on loan at these two clubs he exhibited his strength and speed, grabbing six goals and managing to score a hat-trick in a 3–1 home win for Burnley against Walsall.

=== West Bromwich Albion ===
This was not enough to convince Bolton to play Facey regularly, and so he moved to West Bromwich Albion in January 2004. Again he made only a limited impact, with only two league starts, and was released at the end of his short-term contract.

=== Hull City ===
He then signed a twelve-month contract with Hull City.

On 26 February 2005 he joined Huddersfield Town on a one-month loan deal. After a short and unspectacular spell at the Galpharm Stadium he left the club.

=== Oldham Athletic ===
On 24 March 2005 he joined Oldham Athletic, signing an 18-month deal with the club.

=== Tranmere Rovers ===
On 31 August 2005 he moved to Tranmere Rovers, agreeing a deal until the end of the 2005–06 season. In his first season at Prenton Park, Facey secured a first team slot and managed to find the scoresheet fairly regularly, scoring eight league goals.

=== Rotherham United ===
Following his release from Prenton Park at the end of the 2005–06 season, Facey signed for League One club Rotherham United. He added considerable force to his new club's attack, scoring eleven goals in 36 league appearances. He hit an excellent run of form in March 2007, scoring four goals in three matches.

=== Gillingham ===
On 20 June 2007, chairman Paul Scally confirmed that Facey had signed for Gillingham. On 27 March 2008, Facey signed on loan for Wycombe Wanderers until the end of the season. He scored against former club Bradford in the last game of the season to help them qualify for the play-offs, where his goal against Stockport County in the semi-final was not enough to put them through to the final. He was transfer listed by Gillingham on 5 June 2008. Two months later his contract was terminated by mutual consent. Later the same day he left the club.

=== Notts County ===
Facey signed for Notts County of Football League Two. He made his debut for County against Bradford City, a club where he played on loan, in their 2–1 defeat on the opening day of the 2008–09 season.

In November 2009, Facey signed a loan deal with Lincoln City, scoring his first and only goal for the club against Chesterfield. The loan lasted until 2 January 2010.

In March 2010, a group of Notts County fans attempted to make the 19 March "Delroy Facey Day". However, as no request was formally submitted to Nottingham City Council or Parliament, the day has no legal standing, and cannot be declared and was not formally recognised. In 2010, he was part of the Notts County team that won the Football League Two title.

On 10 May 2010 it was announced that he had been released by Notts County along with 7 other players.

=== Lincoln City ===
In July 2010 he signed a deal with Lincoln City. In March, he dislocated his shoulder, an injury which kept him out for the rest of the season. This injury hit Lincoln especially hard as Facey was at the time club captain and been an inspiration to the team. He had been made captain on 15 January for a match against his former club Wycombe. Lincoln lost that match, after which they were bottom of the League Two table. Facey kept the captaincy though and Lincoln went on to win eight of their next fifteen matches, leading Lincoln up to fourteenth in the table. After dislocating his shoulder in the dying minutes of a draw against Macclesfield, however, and subsequently missing the rest of the season, Lincoln's form dropped severely, earning only one point from their remaining ten fixtures, seeing them relegated on the last day of the season.

In May 2011 he was not offered a new contract after a mass clear out of players following the club's relegation from the Football League.

=== Hereford United ===
Facey signed a one-year deal with Hereford United on 17 June 2011. After Hereford's relegation, Facey was not offered a new contract.

=== Albion Sports ===
During the 2013–14 season Facey joined non-League side Albion Sports.

== International career ==
In 2009, Facey received a call up to play for Grenada and train with them in preparation for the 2009 CONCACAF Gold Cup. He was in line to receive his first cap in a friendly against Panama, but after Grenada's pitch was found to be unsuitable the friendly was called off. He was later named in Grenada's squad for the Gold Cup and made his international debut on 8 July in Grenada's second group match against Honduras. Facey qualifies for Grenada through his mother, who was born on the island. He was also eligible to represent Jamaica (where his father was born) and Trinidad and Tobago (where one of his grandparents was born), even earning a call up to play for the Reggae Boyz, which he could not accept due to a broken ankle. Facey added to his caps during the 2010 Digicel Caribbean Cup, scoring twice for Grenada against St. Kitts and Nevis.

== Personal life ==
He is the older brother of Ossett Town and fellow Grenadan International striker Danny Facey.

Port Vale and Montserrat international midfielder Anthony Griffith is a cousin of Facey's.

== Criminal activity and prison sentence ==
In March 2010, Facey was rumoured to have been involved in a stabbing in Huddersfield; however, after being interviewed by police, he was released without charge. Notts County chairman Ray Trew said it was a case of 'wrong place at the wrong time'.

In November 2013 Facey was arrested, along with five others, on suspicion of match fixing. In April 2015, Facey, with Moses Swaibu, appeared at Birmingham Crown Court in connection with a match-fixing charge. On 29 April 2015, Facey was found guilty of match fixing and jailed for 2 1/2 years.

== Career statistics ==
Football League only. Sources:

Club	Season	Division	League		FA Cup		League Cup		Other		Total	
Club	Season	Division	Apps	Goals	Apps	Goals	Apps	Goals	Apps	Goals	Apps	Goals
Huddersfield Town	1996–97	First Division	3	0	0	0	0	0	0	0	3	0
Huddersfield Town	1997–98	First Division	3	0	0	0	0	0	0	0	3	0
Huddersfield Town	1998–99	First Division	20	3	2	0	0	0	0	0	22	3
Huddersfield Town	1999–2000	First Division	2	0	0	0	0	0	0	0	2	0
Huddersfield Town	2000–01	First Division	34	10	1	0	2	0	0	0	37	10
Huddersfield Town	2001–02	Second Division	13	2	0	0	0	0	2 (Note: Appearance(s) in Division Two play-offs)	0	15	2
Huddersfield Town	Total		75	15	3	0	2	0	2	0	82	15
Bolton Wanderers	2002–03	Premier League	9	2	2	0	0	0	0	0	11	2
Bolton Wanderers	2003–04	Premier League	1	0	2	0	0	0	0	0	3	0
Bolton Wanderers	Total		10	2	4	0	0	0	0	0	14	2
Bradford City (loan)	2002–03	First Division	6	1	0	0	0	0	0	0	6	1
Burnley (loan)	2003–04	First Division	14	5	0	0	2	0	0	0	16	5
West Bromwich Albion	2003–04	First Division	9	0	0	0	0	0	0	0	9	0
Hull City	2004–05	League One	21	4	2	2	1	0	1 (Note: Appearance(s) in Football League Trophy)	0	25	6
Huddersfield Town (loan)	2004–05	League One	4	0	0	0	0	0	0	0	4	0
Oldham Athletic	2004–05	League One	6	0	0	0	0	0	0	0	6	0
Oldham Athletic	2005–06	League One	3	0	0	0	1	0	0	0	4	0
Oldham Athletic	Total		9	0	0	0	1	0	0	0	10	0
Tranmere Rovers	2005–06	League One	37	8	1	0	0	0	3	1	41	9
Rotherham United	2006–07	League One	40	10	1	0	1	0	1	1	43	11
Gillingham	2007–08	League One	32	3	1	0	1	0	1	0	35	3
Wycombe Wanderers (loan)	2007–08	League Two	6	1	0	0	0	0	2 (Note: Appearance(s) in League Two play-offs)	1	8	2
Notts County	2008–09	League Two	45	9	3	0	2	0	1	0	51	9
Notts County	2009–10	League Two	18	2	1	0	0	0	1	1	20	3
Notts County	Total		63	11	4	0	2	0	2	1	71	12
Lincoln City (loan)	2009–10	League Two	10	1	0	0	0	0	0	0	10	1
Lincoln City	2010–11	League Two	32	3	2	1	1	0	1	0	36	4
Total			42	4	2	1	1	0	1	0	46	5
Hereford United	2011–12	League Two	40	6	1	0	2	0	0	0	43	6
Career total			408	70	19	3	13	0	13	4	453	77

== Honours ==
Notts County

- Football League Two: 2009–10
