= Chris Holland =

English footballer (born 1975)

Personal information
- Full name: Christopher James Holland
- Date of birth: 11 September 1975 (age 51)
- Place of birth: Whalley, England
- Height: 5 ft 9 in (1.75 m)
- Position: Midfielder

Team information
- Current team: Darwen FC (back room staff/coaching staff)

Youth career
- Preston North End

Senior career*
Years	Team	Apps	(Gls)
1993–1994	Preston North End	1	(0)
1994–1996	Newcastle United	3	(0)
1996	→ Birmingham City (loan)	9	(0)
1996–2000	Birmingham City	61	(0)
2000–2004	Huddersfield Town	120	(2)
2004–2007	Boston United	85	(0)
2007–2008	Southport	53	(2)
2008	Leigh Genesis	15	(1)
2008–2009	Fleetwood Town	3	(0)
2009	Burscough		
2009	Guiseley	29	(2)
Total		359	(7)

International career
1995–1997	England U21	10	(0)
- * Club domestic league appearances and goals

Christopher James Holland (born 11 September 1975) is an English football coach, currently coaching Darwen FC, and former professional player. He played as a midfielder in the Premier League for Newcastle United and made 279 appearances in the Football League playing for Preston North End, Birmingham City, Huddersfield Town and Boston United. He is a former England under-21 international. He later played non-league football for Boston United, Southport, Leigh Genesis, Fleetwood Town, Burscough and Guiseley, where he began his coaching career. He was briefly assistant manager of AFC Telford United, and joined Clitheroe in 2020.

== Club career ==
Holland was born in Whalley, Lancashire, and started his football career as a trainee at Preston North End in 1993. He made just one league appearance as a substitute before signing for Premier League club Newcastle United on 20 January 1994 for a fee of £100,000. However, an eye injury sustained during an ammonia attack hindered his progress and he joined Birmingham City on loan on 3 September 1996. The loan was made permanent in October 1996 for a fee of £600,000. He helped Birmingham reach the Division One playoffs in 1999, however he missed a crucial penalty as they lost to Watford in a shoot out. He made 88 appearances in all competitions for Birmingham, of which 70 were in the league.

On 3 February 2000, Holland joined Huddersfield Town for a fee of £100,000. He scored the first goal of his professional career, a winner against Nottingham Forest, on 21 March. He played regularly for three seasons, but when told by manager Peter Jackson that a new contract would not be offered at the end of the 2003–04 season, he chose to join League Two club Boston United in March 2004.

After two years playing regularly, during which he made 85 league appearances, he moved nearer to his Lancashire home when he signed an 18-month contract with Conference National club Southport on 31 January 2007 on a free transfer. Despite Southport's relegation to the Conference North at the end of the season, Holland agreed a new contract and was appointed club captain. Holland was a vital part of the Southport side in the 2007–08 season. He scored his first goal for the club at Hyde United. His next goal came three weeks later in Southport's 3–1 victory at his old club Boston United.

In July 2008 Holland signed for Northern Premier League Premier Division club Leigh Genesis on a free transfer. He made his debut on the opening day of the 2008–09 season, in a 2–0 defeat to Eastwood Town. He scored his first goal in his tenth game for the club on 20 September in a 4–2 defeat to Whitby Town.

On 14 November 2008 he joined Conference North club Fleetwood Town, making his debut the next day in a 2–1 away victory over Stafford Rangers. In March 2009, Holland joined another Conference North outfit, Burscough.

He remained at Burscough until the end of the season, then joined Guiseley of the Northern Premier League. He helped that club win the title in his first season, but was appointed assistant manager in September 2010, and thereafter his competitive appearances were restricted to the substitutes' bench. After Guiseley sacked manager Steve Kittrick in September 2013, Holland stayed on briefly as assistant to caretaker Mark Bower, but a review of management structures meant he left two weeks later.

In May 2015, Holland joined up with Kittrick again as assistant manager of Conference North club AFC Telford United. Just five matches into the new season, with the team bottom of the table, Kittrick and Holland were dismissed.

In May 2020, Holland became assistant manager at Clitheroe of the Northern Premier League Division One North-West.

Outside football, Holland works in construction.

== International career ==
Holland is a former England youth and under-21 international. He won the first of his ten under-21 caps while at Newcastle.

== Career statistics ==
Appearances and goals by club, season and competition
Club	Season	League			FA Cup		League Cup		Other		Total	
Club	Season	Division	Apps	Goals	Apps	Goals	Apps	Goals	Apps	Goals	Apps	Goals
Preston North End	1993–94	Third Division	1	0	0	0	0	0	1 (Note: Appearances in Football League Trophy)	0	2	0
Newcastle United	1993–94	Premier League	3	0	0	0	—		—		3	0
Newcastle United	1994–95	Premier League	0	0	0	0	0	0	0	0	0	0
Newcastle United	1995–96	Premier League	0	0	0	0	1	0	—		1	0
Newcastle United	1996–97	Premier League	0	0	—		—		0	0	1	0
Newcastle United	Totals		3	0	0	0	1	0	0	0	4	0
Birmingham City	1996–97 (Note: Part of this season was spent on loan from Newcastle United.)	First Division	32	0	3	0	0	0	—		35	0
Birmingham City	1997–98	First Division	10	0	0	0	3	0	—		13	0
Birmingham City	1998–99	First Division	14	0	0	0	5	0	2 (Note: Appearances in Football League First Division play-offs)	0	21	0
Birmingham City	1999–2000	First Division	14	0	1	0	4	0	—		19	0
Birmingham City	Totals		70	0	4	0	12	0	2	0	88	0
Huddersfield Town	1999–2000	First Division	17	1	—		—		—		17	1
Huddersfield Town	2000–01	First Division	29	0	1	0	1	0	—		31	0
Huddersfield Town	2001–02	Second Division	37	1	2	0	1	0	8 (Note: Six appearances and one goal in Football League Trophy, two appearances in Football League Second Division play-offs)	1	48	2
Huddersfield Town	2002–03	Second Division	34	0	1	0	2	0	1	0	38	0
Huddersfield Town	2003–04	Third Division	3	0	1	0	0	0	1	0	5	0
Huddersfield Town	Totals		120	2	5	0	4	0	10	1	139	3
Boston United	2003–04	Third Division	5	0	—		—		—		5	0
Boston United	2004–05	League Two	32	0	3	0	1	0	1	0	37	0
Boston United	2005–06	League Two	34	0	3	0	1	0	2	0	40	0
Boston United	2006–07	League Two	14	0	1	0	1	0	1	0	17	0
Boston United	Total		85	0	7	0	3	0	4	0	99	0
Southport	2006–07	Conference National	17	0	—		—		0	0	17	0
Southport	2007–08	Conference North	36	2	3	0	—		8 (Note: Three appearances in Lancashire Junior Cup, two in Conference North play-offs, one each in FA Trophy, Conference League Cup, and Liverpool Senior Cup)	0	47	2
Southport	Totals		53	2	3	0	—		8	0	64	2
Leigh Genesis	2008–09	Northern Premier League Premier Division	15	1	1	0	—		2 (Note: Appearances in FA Trophy)	0	18	1
Fleetwood Town	2008–09	Conference North					—					
Burscough	2008–09	Conference North					—					
Guiseley	2009–10	Northern Premier League Premier Division	29	2	3	0	—		9 (Note: Six appearances in FA Trophy, two in West Riding County Cup, one in Peter Swales Shield)	0	41	2
Guiseley	2010–11	Conference North	0	0	0	0	—		0	0	0	0
Guiseley	2011–12	Conference North	0	0	0	0	—		0	0	0	0
Guiseley	Totals		29	2	3	0	—		9	0	41	2
Career totals			376	7	23	0	20	0	36	1	455	8
