= Danny Schofield =

English footballer

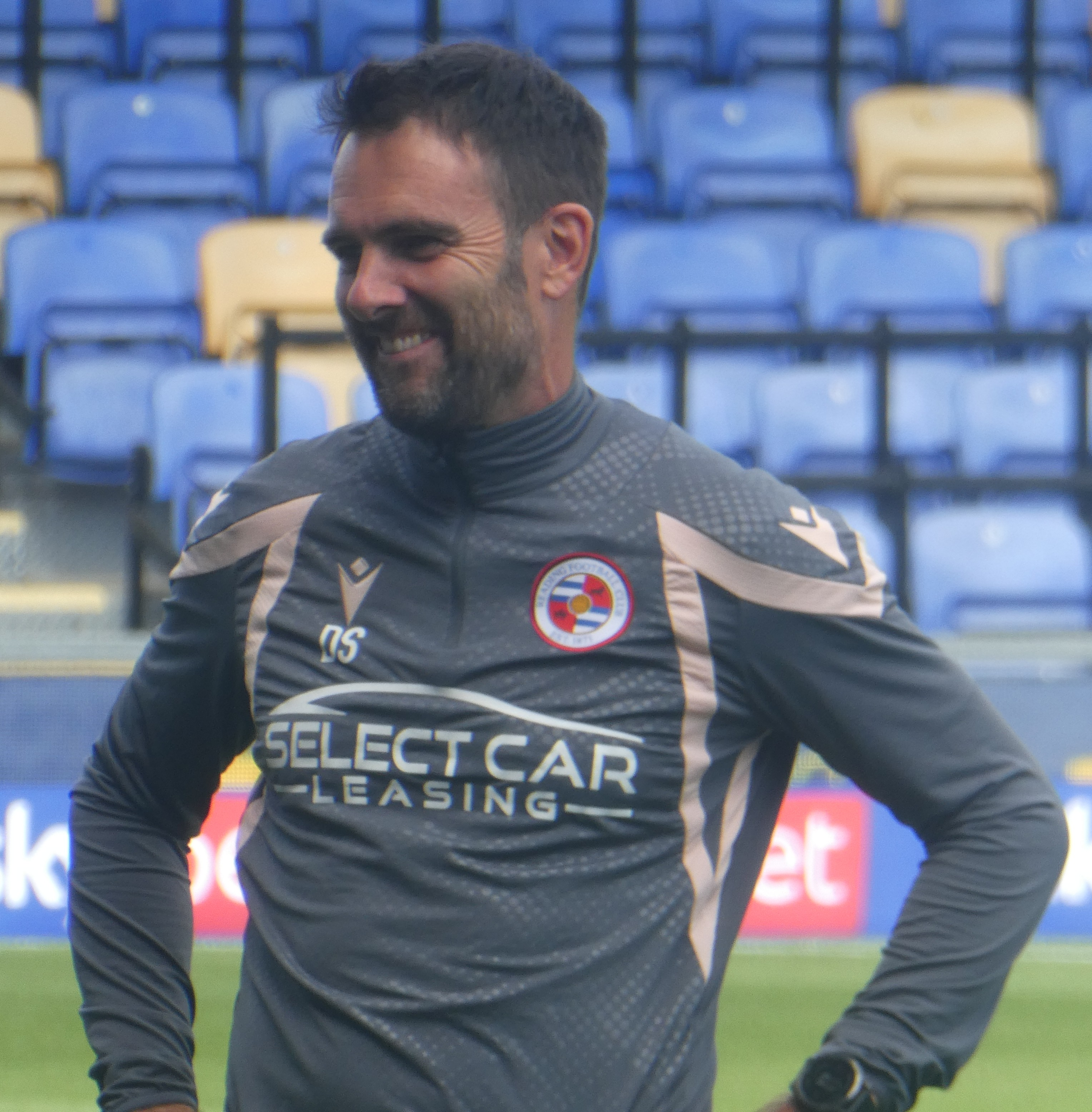
- Schofield in 2026

Personal information
- Full name: Daniel James Schofield
- Date of birth: 10 April 1980 (age 46)
- Place of birth: Doncaster, England
- Height: 5 ft 10 in (1.78 m)
- Positions: Midfielder; forward

Team information
- Current team: Reading (first team coach)

Senior career*
Years	Team	Apps	(Gls)
1997–1998	Brodsworth Welfare		
1998–2008	Huddersfield Town	248	(39)
2008–2009	Yeovil Town	43	(5)
2009–2011	Millwall	67	(9)
2011–2014	Rotherham United	37	(1)
2012	→ Accrington Stanley (loan)	8	(0)
2013	→ Stockport County (loan)	5	(0)
2014–2015	FC Halifax Town	35	(1)
2015–2016	Bradford Park Avenue	21	(0)
2016–2017	Mickleover Sports	22	(0)
Total		486	(55)

Managerial career
- 2020: Huddersfield Town (caretaker)
- 2022: Huddersfield Town
- 2022–2023: Doncaster Rovers
- * Club domestic league appearances and goals

Daniel James Schofield (born 10 April 1980) is an English former footballer and manager who is currently a first team coach at Reading.

== Playing career ==
=== Huddersfield Town ===
Schofield was signed by Huddersfield Town from Brodsworth Welfare for a fee of £2,000 in 1998. Although Schofield made his debut in the 1998–99 season against Crewe Alexandra, his first full season in the team came in the 2001–02 season when he found the net 11 times operating as a striker, since then he had been playing as an attacking right sided midfielder until was moved to the left side of midfield.

On 28 February 2008, it was revealed on Huddersfield Town's official website that Danny had requested a move away from the club. Manager, Andy Ritchie explained his name had been circulated with a view to either a loan switch or permanent deal at the end of the season. Yeovil Town were the favorites to capture his signature, although Chesterfield and Rotherham United did also show interest in the midfielder.

On 26 April, he scored on his last home game for Huddersfield Town against Walsall. Huddersfield won the game 2–0.

=== Yeovil Town ===
The day after being officially released by Huddersfield Town, he agreed to join Yeovil Town, with effect from 1 July.

=== Millwall ===
On 1 September 2009, Schofield agreed to join League One side Millwall on a two-year deal, after an undisclosed fee was accepted by Yeovil.

=== Rotherham United ===
At the end of June 2011, Schofield joined League Two club Rotherham United on a free transfer. After not featuring in new Rotherham manager Steve Evans plans for the 2012–13 season, Schofield joined Accrington Stanley on loan for three months on 12 September 2012. He returned to Rotherham United in December 2012, after making 8 appearances on loan. On 13 March 2013, Schofield joined Conference Premier side Stockport County on loan until the end of the season.

After not making an appearance for Rotherham since 2012, Schofield was released at the end of the 2013–14 season.

=== Return to non-league and retirement ===
After his release from Rotherham, Schofield joined Conference Premier side FC Halifax Town following a successful trial.

On 28 June 2015, Schofield joined National League North club Bradford Park Avenue as a player-coach.

After a season with Bradford, Schofield joined Northern Premier League Premier Division side Mickleover Sports ahead of the 2016–17 season. In his final season as a player Schofield made 22 league appearances for Mickleover.

== Coaching career ==
While still a player with Rotherham United, Schofield began coaching in the Barnsley youth academy working with the under-12s, under-13s and under-14s. In 2015, Schofield then spent a season as a player-coach with National League North club Bradford Park Avenue.

In December 2016, Schofield joined Leeds United as a coach working with the under-15s and under16s. Schofield was promoted to the role of professional development phase coach, working with the under-23s alongside Carlos Corberán. Corberán and Schofield's under-23 side won the 2018–19 Professional Development League Northern League, and then became the national Professional Development League champions by beating Birmingham City under-23s in the final. In August 2019, Schofield left Leeds United to join fellow Championship side Middlesbrough as the club's new under-23 assistant lead coach.

After six months on Teesside, on 3 February 2020, Schofield returned to Huddersfield Town as under-19 coach. After the sacking of Danny Cowley as Huddersfield Town manager, on 20 July 2020, Schofield was appointed as caretaker manager for the Terriers' final Championship fixture of the 2019–20 season. On 22 July 2020, Schofield's only match in charge as caretaker manager resulted in a 4–1 away defeat against Millwall. In August 2020, after the appointment of Carlos Corberán as Huddersfield Town head coach Schofield was promoted to work with the first team as professional development coach and to head up the new B team.

Schofield took charge of the team for the first game of the 2021–22 season as Carlos Corberán was isolating after a positive test for COVID-19.

On 7 July 2022, following the resignation of Corberán, Schofield was named as the new head coach of Huddersfield Town, being assisted by Narcís Pèlach. After a run of only one win from his first eight league games, Schofield was relieved of his duties on 14 September 2022. After just 69 days in the role, Schofield became the club's shortest serving manager.

On 20 October 2022, Schofield was appointed head coach of League Two club Doncaster Rovers on a one-year rolling contract. After Rovers finished 18th in League Two in the 2022–2023 season, Schofield was sacked on 9 May 2023.

On 2 December 2023, Schofield was announced as the assistant coach at Central Coast. This was announced after he turned down multiple jobs in England, opting to instead join his former colleague at Leeds United, Mark Jackson. He went viral on social media after pulling the middle finger in front of a camera after being sent off for receiving 2 yellow cards in 10 seconds.

On 28 October 2025, Schofield joined Reading as a first team coach.

== Career statistics ==
=== Player ===
Appearances and goals by club, season and competition
Club	Season	League			FA Cup		League Cup		Other		Total	
Club	Season	Division	Apps	Goals	Apps	Goals	Apps	Goals	Apps	Goals	Apps	Goals
Brodsworth Welfare	1997–98	NCEFL Division One	~	~	~	~	—		~	~	~	~
Huddersfield Town	1998–99	First Division	1	0	0	0	0	0	—		1	0
Huddersfield Town	1999–2000	First Division	2	0	1	0	1	0	—		4	0
Huddersfield Town	2000–01	First Division	1	0	0	0	0	0	—		1	0
Huddersfield Town	2001–02	Second Division	40	8	2	0	0	0	6 (Note: Appearance(s) in Football League Trophy)	4	48	12
Huddersfield Town	2002–03	Second Division	30	2	1	0	2	0	1	0	34	2
Huddersfield Town	2003–04	Third Division	40	8	1	0	3	0	4 (Note: One appearance in Football League Trophy, three appearances and one goal in Third Division play-offs)	1	48	9
Huddersfield Town	2004–05	League One	33	5	1	0	0	0	2	1	36	6
Huddersfield Town	2005–06	League One	41	9	3	1	2	0	2 (Note: Appearances in League One play-offs)	0	48	10
Huddersfield Town	2006–07	League One	35	5	1	0	1	0	1	0	38	5
Huddersfield Town	2007–08	League One	25	2	5	0	1	0	1	0	32	2
Huddersfield Town	Total		248	39	15	1	10	0	17	6	290	46
Yeovil Town	2008–09	League One	39	4	2	0	1	0	0	0	42	4
Yeovil Town	2009–10	League One	4	1	0	0	1	0	0	0	5	1
Yeovil Town	Total		43	5	2	0	2	0	0	0	47	5
Millwall	2009–10	League One	36	7	4	2	—		2	0	42	9
Millwall	2010–11	Championship	31	2	1	1	3	0	—		35	3
Millwall	Total		67	9	5	3	3	0	2	0	77	12
Rotherham United	2011–12	League Two	37	1	2	0	1	0	1	0	41	1
Rotherham United	2012–13	League Two	0	0	0	0	0	0	0	0	0	0
Rotherham United	2013–14	League One	0	0	0	0	0	0	0	0	0	0
Rotherham United	Total		37	1	2	0	1	0	1	0	41	1
Accrington Stanley (loan)	2012–13	League Two	8	0	0	0	0	0	0	0	8	0
Stockport County (loan)	2012–13	Conference Premier	5	0	0	0	—		0	0	5	0
FC Halifax Town	2014–15	Conference Premier	35	1	1	0	—		6 (Note: Five appearances in FA Trophy, one appearance in West Riding County Cup)	0	42	1
Bradford Park Avenue	2015–16	National League North	21	0	3	0	—		1 (Note: Appearance in FA Trophy)	0	25	0
Mickleover Sports	2016–17	NPL Premier Division	22	0	2	0	—		5 (Note: Four appearances in FA Trophy, one appearance in Northern Premier League Challenge Cup)	0	29	0
Career total			486	55	30	4	16	0	32	6	564	65

=== Managerial ===
Managerial record by team and tenure
Team	From	To	Record					Ref
Team	From	To	P	W	D	L	Win %	Ref
Huddersfield Town (caretaker)	20 July 2020	23 July 2020	1	0	0	1	0.0	
Huddersfield Town	7 July 2022	14 September 2022	9	1	1	7	11.1	
Doncaster Rovers	22 October 2022	9 May 2023	33	10	4	19	30.3	
Total			43	11	5	27	25.6	—

== Personal life ==
Schofield graduated from Manchester Metropolitan University in July 2016 with a bachelor's degree in Sports Science.

== Honours ==
Huddersfield Town

- Football League Third Division play-offs: 2004

Millwall

- Football League One play-offs: 2010
