= Sean McCarthy (footballer, born 1967) =

Welsh footballer, coach, and manager

Personal information
- Date of birth: 12 September 1967 (age 59)
- Place of birth: Bridgend, Glamorgan, Wales
- Height: 6 ft 0 in (1.83 m)
- Position: Striker

Senior career*
Years	Team	Apps	(Gls)
1984–1985	Bridgend Town	?	(?)
1985–1988	Swansea City	91	(25)
1988–1990	Plymouth Argyle	70	(19)
1990–1993	Bradford City	131	(60)
1993–1998	Oldham Athletic	140	(42)
1998	→ Bristol City (loan)	7	(1)
1998–2001	Plymouth Argyle	82	(19)
2001–2003	Exeter City	26	(6)
2003–2004	Taunton Town	?	(?)
Total		547	(171)

Managerial career
- 2008–2009: Truro City
- 2016: Newport County (joint caretaker)
- * Club domestic league appearances and goals

Sean McCarthy (born 12 September 1967) is a Welsh football manager, coach and former professional player who made over 500 appearances in the Football League.

McCarthy played primarily as a striker; however, he was also used in defence.

== Career ==
=== Playing career ===
Born in Bridgend, Glamorgan, McCarthy began his career with hometown team Bridgend Town, before moving to Swansea City just a season later. McCarthy also played in the Football League for Plymouth Argyle, Bradford City (where he was top goalscorer for four consecutive seasons), Oldham Athletic, Bristol City and Exeter City, scoring 171 goals in 547 appearances.

He is the most recent player to score a top flight goal for Oldham Athletic, scoring for them in a 1–1 FA Premier League draw against Norwich City at Carrow Road on the final day of the 1993–94 season, a game which Oldham's failure to win cost them their top flight status. They have not since regained it.

McCarthy later played non-league football for Taunton Town.

=== Coaching career ===
In May 2008, McCarthy was appointed as the new manager of Southern League Division One side Truro City, following the resignation of Dave Leonard. On 7 December 2009, McCarthy left the club by mutual consent following a 7–2 away defeat to Stourbridge.

On 13 January 2011, McCarthy was given a job as a coach at Ipswich Town, by former playing partner Paul Jewell.

On 26 June 2013, McCarthy was appointed first team coach at English Football League Two club Plymouth Argyle On 15 June 2015, he left his position as first team coach at Plymouth Argyle due to a back room staff restructuring.

In July 2016 McCarthy was appointed first team coach under team manager Warren Feeney at Newport County, replacing Mike Flynn. Feeney and his assistant manager Andy Todd were sacked by Newport on 28 September 2016; McCarthy was appointed joint caretaker manager with Newport's goalkeeping player/coach James Bittner. After Graham Westley was appointed team manager effective from 10 October 2016 (with Dino Maamria his assistant manager), McCarthy was released by the club.

== Managerial statistics ==
As of match played 8 October 2016

Managerial record by team and tenure
Team	Nat	From	To	Record								Ref
Team	Nat	From	To	G	W	D	L	GF	GA	GD	Win %	Ref
Truro City	(England)	19 May 2008	7 December 2009	66	40	14	12	172	92	+80	60.61	
Newport County (joint caretaker)	(Wales)	28 September 2016	10 October 2016	2	0	1	1	1	2	−1	0.00	—
Total				68	40	15	13	173	94	+79	58.82	—

== Honours ==
Swansea City

- Football League Fourth Division play-offs: 1988
