= Ian Ayre =

American football club director

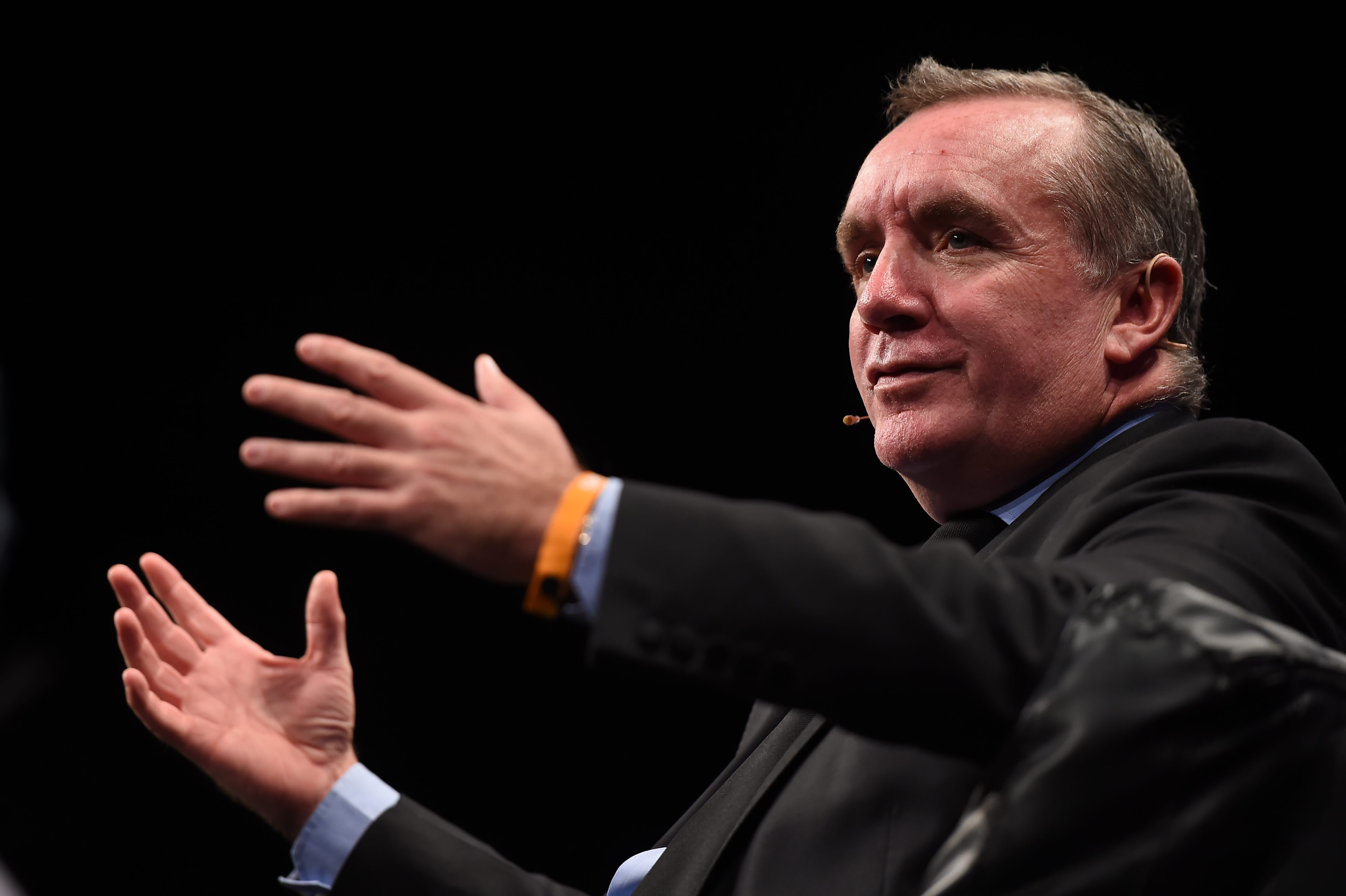
- Ayre in 2015
- Born: 6 July 1963 (age 63); Liverpool, England

Ian Ayre (born 6 July 1963) is the CEO of Nashville SC of Major League Soccer and a former chief executive officer and main board director of Premier League club Liverpool.

== Career ==
Leaving school at age 16, he joined the Royal Navy. After leaving the senior service, he then undertook various roles in business in Asia, eventually becoming chief executive of Pace Systems.

== Liverpool FC ==
On 15 October 2010, NESV completed its £300m takeover of Liverpool, at which time the club's existing Managing Director Christian Purslow stepped down. The club's owners, Fenway Sports Group, led by John W. Henry and the chairman Tom Werner, announced Ayre as the new Managing Director on 22 March 2011. With the sacking of sporting director Damien Comolli in April 2012, Ayre was given more responsibility and in May 2014 was officially promoted to chief executive officer. In March 2016, Liverpool announced Ayre would step down as CEO at the end of May 2017, when his current contract expired.

In November 2016, Ayre was awarded the 'fcbusiness Premier League CEO of the Year' award at the Football Business Awards 2016.

=== Criticisms ===
In 2012, a transfer committee was established after Liverpool's failure to land several notable transfers and underwhelming incoming transfers were widely criticized by media and fans alike. In January 2016, Ayre was criticized for his role in a proposed increase in ticket prices despite boosts in commercial revenue, which led to a walkout of 10,000 fans led by fan group Spirit of Shankly. The club owners later issued a formal apology and reversed their decision.

== 1860 Munich ==
Ayre left Liverpool at the end of February 2017 to take over as managing director of TSV 1860 Munich in Germany. He left this position in May 2017 shortly before 1860 Munich was relegated to the 3. Liga and later went down to the fourth division due to financial issues.

== Nashville SC ==
On 21 May 2018, Ayre was named the CEO of the Nashville expansion franchise in the American Major League Soccer.
