= Martyn Margetson =

Welsh footballer and coach

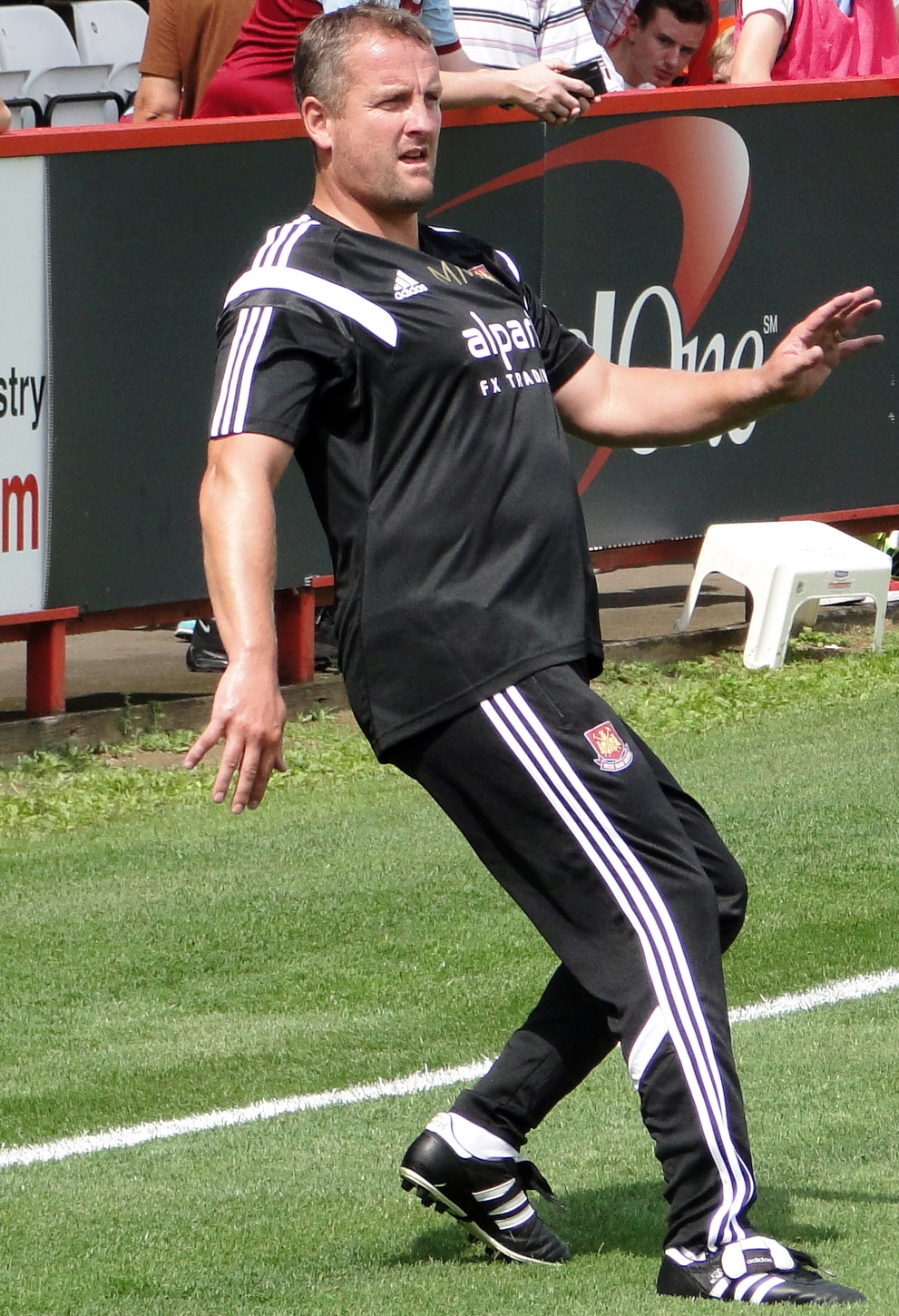
- Margetson with West Ham United in 2014

Personal information
- Full name: Martyn Walter Margetson
- Date of birth: 8 September 1971 (age 55)
- Place of birth: Neath, Wales
- Height: 6 ft 0 in (1.83 m)
- Position: Goalkeeper

Team information
- Current team: Swansea City (goalkeeping coach); Wales (goalkeeping coach)

Senior career*
Years	Team	Apps	(Gls)
1992–1998	Manchester City	50	(0)
1993	→ Bristol Rovers (loan)	3	(0)
1994	→ Bolton Wanderers (loan)	0	(0)
1995	→ Luton Town (loan)	0	(0)
1998–1999	Southend United	32	(0)
1999–2002	Huddersfield Town	48	(0)
2002–2007	Cardiff City	32	(0)
Total		165	(0)

International career
1991–1993	Wales U21	7	(0)
2004	Wales	1	(0)
- * Club domestic league appearances and goals

Martyn Walter Margetson (born 8 September 1971) is a Welsh football coach and former professional footballer who is a goalkeeping coach for the Wales national team and Swansea City.

A youth player at Manchester City, where he went on to appear over 50 times, he spent time on loan at Bristol Rovers, Bolton Wanderers and Luton Town before moving to Southend United on a permanent basis in 1998 where he remained for one season, joining Huddersfield Town in 1999. After signing for Cardiff City in 2002, he went on to win his first and only cap for Wales in a friendly with Canada in May 2004.

He retired from playing at the end of the 2006–07 season, becoming a full-time goalkeeper coach at Cardiff City. He has since had similar roles at West Ham United, Wales, Crystal Palace and Swansea City.

== Career ==
=== Manchester City ===
Margetson began his career with Manchester City, signing as a YTS trainee at the age of 18 where he featured largely as understudy during a downturn in the club's fortunes. His full debut came in May 1990, deputising for the suspended Tony Coton in a Manchester derby at Old Trafford, and he retained his place for the following match against Sunderland. In the next two seasons he made four appearances, but did not make a single first team appearance in the two seasons after. His next first team appearance was an unusual one. In a League Cup match against Wycombe, Manchester City had used both outfield substitutes when Richard Edghill sustained an injury and could not continue. Margetson, the only remaining substitute, was introduced as a striker for the final few minutes of the match.

Despite performing well in the run-in to the club's relegation battle to the 3rd-tier of English football in 1998, he was guilty of picking up a back pass to concede a free-kick inside the penalty area against Queens Park Rangers. He proceeded to hand the ball to the opposing forward Mike Sheron who then quickly took the free kick, passing to a team-mate who stroked the ball into an unguarded net. This goal later proved to be costly as City were relegated in QPR's stead at the end of the season.

=== Southend United ===
Margetson moved on at the end of season on a free transfer for a spell with Southend United, making his debut on 8 August 1998 in a 2–1 victory over Scarborough. However, he remained at Roots Hall for just one season after losing his place in the side to Mel Capleton.

=== Huddersfield Town ===
He came close to signing for Division Two side Blackpool, before eventually joining Huddersfield Town in August 1999. Finding himself as back-up to Nico Vaesen, Margetson was forced to wait until April 2001 to make his debut for Huddersfield during a 2–0 defeat to Blackburn Rovers after Vaesen was shown a red card for handball. Following the sale of Vaesen to Birmingham City in the summer of 2001, Margetson took over as first choice goalkeeper for the 2001–02 season and played in every game as they reached the play-offs after finishing sixth, suffering defeat to Brentford, but was released at the end of the season.

=== Cardiff City ===
He joined Cardiff City on trial during a pre-season tour in Scotland, before eventually signing a permanent deal at Ninian Park. He made his debut for Cardiff on 11 September 2002 in a 5–1 victory over Boston United in the Football League Cup. Margetson spent the majority of his first season as back-up to Neil Alexander, but made a bigger impact during the 2003–04 season, making 25 appearances in all competitions and was rewarded with a new two-year contract, rejecting an approach from the club's South Wales rivals Swansea City. However, after beginning the 2004–05 season as first choice goalkeeper, he lost his place after missing most of the season with injury due to undergoing knee surgery and the removal of two discs from his back.

During the 2005–06 season, he made just two appearances in League Cup ties against Macclesfield Town and Leicester City. Out of contract at the end of the season, Margetson was initially not offered a new deal but, following the departure of the club's goalkeeping coach George Wood, he signed a new one-year deal to take over as a player-coach, rejecting a second offer from Swansea City. He remained as back-up to Neil Alexander throughout the season and announced his retirement at the end of year, becoming the club's full-time goalkeeper coach.

== International career ==
Having won seven caps at under-21 level, his last appearance coming in 1993, earlier in his career, he was called up to the Wales senior side by manager Mark Hughes for the first time in his career in March 2004 for a friendly match with Hungary, but remained on the bench. Two months later, Margetson received his second call-up for friendly matches with Norway and Canada. An unused substitute against Norway, Margetson was handed his international debut on 30 May 2004 when he replaced Danny Coyne at half-time during a 1–0 win over Canada. He later received two further call-ups in 2005 under new manager John Toshack for matches against Slovenia and Azerbaijan but was an unused substitute in both games.

== Coaching career ==
During his last season of playing football, Margetson became Cardiff's player-goalkeeping coach, before retiring at the end of the 2005–06 season and becoming the full-time goalkeeping coach. After Gary Speed's appointment as Wales manager, Margetson was appointed their goalkeeping coach on 15 January 2011, becoming Speed's first back room appointment.

On 4 July 2011, Margetson quit his coaching job at Cardiff in order to join up with Sam Allardyce at West Ham United as their new goalkeeping coach. In October 2014, following the appointment of new Cardiff manager, Russell Slade, Margetson returned as goalkeeping coach to Cardiff City. In August 2016, Margetson stepped down from his role with Wales to join the England national football team coaching staff, following the appointment of Sam Allardyce. On 12 January 2017 it was announced that Margetson had joined Crystal Palace as goalkeeping coach. He joined Everton in December 2017, and left on 16 May 2018 after the departure of Sam Allardyce.

Margetson joined Swansea City in June 2019 as the club's new goalkeeping coach, which he performed alongside his role with the England national team. He then departed the club, following the end of Steve Cooper's tenure at the Swans in 2021.

On 23 August 2024, it was confirmed Margetson had left his position with England. Four days later, it was confirmed that he had returned to Wales as goalkeeping coach as part of Craig Bellamy's staff.

== Outside football ==
Margetson owns a property business with former Cardiff teammate John Robinson.

== Honours ==
Cardiff City

- Football League Second Division play-offs: 2003
