= Kwami Hodouto =

Togolese footballer (born 1974)

Personal information
- Date of birth: 31 October 1974 (age 52)
- Place of birth: Lomé, Togo
- Height: 1.80 m (5 ft 11 in)
- Position: Defender

Senior career*
Years	Team	Apps	(Gls)
1995–1997	Cannes	9	(0)
1997–1999	Auxerre	0	(0)
1998	→ Red Star (loan)	8	(0)
1999–2000	Huddersfield Town	2	(0)
2001–2005	Olympique Noisy-le-Sec		
- * Club domestic league appearances and goals

Kwami Hodouto (born 31 October 1974) is a Togolese former professional footballer who played for French clubs AS Cannes, AJ Auxerre, Red Star Saint-Ouen, (Note: Kwami Hodouto – French league stats at LFP – also available in French (archived)), and Olympique Noisy-le-Sec, and English club Huddersfield Town.

He acquired French nationality by naturalization on 14 May 1996.
