= Darren Edmondson =

English footballer (born 1971)

Personal information
- Full name: Darren Stephen Edmondson
- Date of birth: 4 November 1971 (age 54)
- Place of birth: Coniston, England
- Position: Defender

Youth career
- ?–1990: Carlisle United

Senior career*
Years	Team	Apps	(Gls)
1990–1997	Carlisle United	214	(8)
1997–2000	Huddersfield Town	37	(0)
1998	→ Plymouth Argyle (loan)	4	(0)
2000–2004	York City	131	(6)
2004–2005	Chester City	27	(0)
2005	Barrow		
2006–2013	Workington		

Managerial career
- 2005: Barrow (caretaker)
- 2007–2013: Workington
- 2013–2015: Barrow
- 2016: Bradford Park Avenue (caretaker)
- 2022–2025: Penrith
- 2025: Workington
- * Club domestic league appearances and goals

Darren Stephen Edmondson (born 4 November 1971) is an English football coach and former player. He was most recently manager of Workington.

Edmondson spent around half his professional playing career with Carlisle after signing as a youth player in 1990, later having four years with York City and shorter spells at four other clubs. In 2006, he joined semi-professional Workington, becoming player-manager a year later. He was with Workington until 2013, becoming the club's longest serving manager. He left to join local rivals Barrow as manager, with whom he won the Conference North in 2015. He has been at Carlisle since June 2016, after being sacked by Barrow late in 2015.

== Career ==
Born in Coniston, then in Lancashire, Edmondson started as a trainee at Carlisle United, where he stayed for seven years before being transferred to Huddersfield Town for £225,500. He had a difficult time there however, he even scored a bizarre own goal against Ipswich Town, in which he was passing the ball back to Town's keeper Steve Francis and it somehow went through his legs and into the goal.

He went to York City in 2000, before leaving to Chester City after York's relegation to the Football Conference. He spent just one year at Chester and joined non-League side Barrow under Lee Turnbull. After Turnbull was sacked Edmondson had a brief spell as caretaker manager before the appointment of Phil Wilson. Wilson set about bringing in his own players and Edmondson left Barrow and signed for Workington. He made his debut for Workington on 7 January 2006 at Worksop Town. He scored his first goal for the club at Alfreton Town on 14 March.

On 5 November Workington manager Tommy Cassidy resigned to take over at Newcastle Blue Star, taking with him his number two Tony Elliott. The Workington board acted quickly and appointed Edmondson as caretaker manager on the very same day. He was later given the job on a full-time basis and was officially announced as manager at the home tie against Redditch United on 6 October 2007. He stayed with Workington for 6 years, becoming the club's longest serving manager while keeping the team in the Conference North for successive seasons. In December 2013 he resigned as Workington manager with the club near the bottom of the league, and within hours of the resignation he was appointed Barrow manager.

When Darren joined Barrow, they sat in the relegation zone in the Conference North. A run of good form saw Barrow rise up the table, to the fringes of the playoffs, with wins against promotion hopefuls AFC Telford United and North Ferriby United. Eventually leading the club to a mid table finish. Darren then led Barrow to the Conference North title the following season, with a final day 3–2 victory at Lowestoft Town, bringing Conference football back to Holker Street. Barrow then started the newly named 'National League' season with a 2–1 victory over Dover Athletic, but with results not going in Barrow's favour, both parties agreed that parting company would be in their best interests on 22 November 2015.

On 22 March 2016, Edmondson was appointed caretaker manager of Bradford Park Avenue, replacing Martin Drury, until the end of the season. After ensuring the club avoided relegation, he took the opportunity to rejoin Carlisle United in June 2016, becoming head of the club's academy.

In September 2019, he moved to Rochdale to become Head of Academy coaching after the previous incumbent Rick Ashcroft had departed for a Premier League club.

On 19 May 2022, Edmondson was appointed manager of Northern Football League Division One club Penrith.

In May 2025, Edmondson returned to Workington for a second-spell as manager. Following a poor start to the season, the club parted ways with Edmondson in October 2025.

== Honours ==
Carlisle United

- Football League Third Division: 1994–95
- Football League Trophy runner-up: 1994–95
