= Clyde Wijnhard =

Dutch footballer

Personal information
- Date of birth: 1 November 1973 (age 53)
- Place of birth: Paramaribo, Suriname
- Height: 1.80 m (5 ft 11 in)
- Position: Striker

Senior career*
Years	Team	Apps	(Gls)
1993–1995	AFC Ajax	4	(2)
1993–1994	→ FC Groningen (loan)	28	(14)
1995–1997	RKC Waalwijk	50	(18)
1997–1998	Willem II	29	(14)
1998–1999	Leeds United	18	(3)
1999–2002	Huddersfield Town	63	(16)
2002	Preston North End	6	(3)
2002–2003	Oldham Athletic	26	(10)
2003–2004	Beira-Mar	29	(9)
2004–2006	Darlington	39	(15)
2005–2006	→ Macclesfield Town (loan)	12	(6)
2006	Macclesfield Town	8	(2)
2006	Brentford	9	(0)
Total		321	(112)
- * Club domestic league appearances and goals

Clyde Wijnhard (born 1 November 1973) is a Dutch former professional footballer who played as a striker.

Born in Paramaribo, Suriname, Wijnhard started his career in the Netherlands with AFC Ajax, and had spells with FC Groningen, RKC Waalwijk and Willem II before joining Premier League club Leeds United for a £1.5 million fee in 1998. He joined Huddersfield Town in 1999 but suffered a near-fatal car accident the following year. He joined Preston North End and later had spells with Oldham Athletic, Beira-Mar, Darlington, Macclesfield Town and Brentford before retiring in 2006.

== Playing career ==
=== Early career ===
Born in Paramaribo, Wijnhard started his career at Ajax in 1993, scoring 2 in 4 matches in the 1992–93 season and had a loan spell at FC Groningen in the 1993–94 season, where he scored 14 in 28 matches. Following his return from loan, manager Louis van Gaal unsuccessfully attempted to use Wijnhard as a right back. After two seasons with RKC Waalwijk between 1995 and 1997, in which he scored 18 goals in 50 games, he signed for Willem II on a two-year contract in September 1997. He scored 14 goals in 29 matches during the 1997–98 season.

=== Leeds United ===
Wijnhard joined Premier League club Leeds United in summer 1998 for a fee of £1.5 million. He was signed as a strike partner to fellow Dutch forward Jimmy Floyd Hasselbaink, who had scored 22 goals for the club during the previous season. He scored his first goal for the club on 8 September in the club's 3–0 win over Southampton, but his game time was limited following the departure of manager George Graham, and he scored 4 goals in 25 matches across all competitions during the 1998–99 season.

=== Huddersfield Town ===
Wijnhard signed for First Division club Huddersfield Town in summer 1999 for a fee of £750,000.

In September 2000, Wijnhard suffered a near-fatal car accident which left him unable to play for the next 18 months.

=== Preston North End and Oldham Athletic ===
In March 2002, Wijnhard joined First Division side Preston North End on a free transfer. He made his debut for the club on 23 March 2002, starting in their 2–0 win away to Stockport County.

In summer 2002, he turned down an offer of a three-year deal at Preston. He subsequently had trials at Barnsley and Galatasaray before joining Oldham Athletic on a non-contract basis on 29 August 2002. He signed a contract until the end of the season the following week.

=== Later career ===
Wijnhard spent the 2003–04 season in Portugal with Beira-Mar on a week-to-week contract but eventually left the club due to a lack of game time, and returned to England.

In October 2004, Wijnhard joined Darlington on a match-by-match contract. He scored on his debut for the club on 2 October 2004 as they beat Southend United 4–0 on 2 October. The following month, he signed a contract until summer 2006. On 7 October 2005, the club announced that they had terminated his contract, but his registration was retained and he joined Macclesfield Town on loan on 14 October. He joined the club on a permanent deal in January 2006. He was released by Macclesfield at the end of the season.

After trial spells at Chester City and NAC Breda, he joined Brentford on trial in September 2006, and signed a three-month contract with the club later that month. He was released by the club in December 2006, shortly prior to the end of his contract.

Wijnhard appeared for Bramham FC of the Harrogate and District Association Football League, who he joined in the summer of 2006. As of the 2009/2010 season Wijnhard played for Shadwell United in the Yorkshire Old Boys League (now Yorkshire Amateur League). He has also appeared again for Leeds United albeit in Masters Football alongside Darren Huckerby.

== After football ==
He helps young Dutch men's footballers gain trials at English clubs.
