= Kevin Gray (footballer) =

English footballer

Personal information
- Full name: Kevin John Gray
- Date of birth: 7 January 1972 (age 54)
- Place of birth: Sheffield, England
- Position: Defender

Senior career*
| Years | Team | Apps | (Gls) |
| 1990–1994 | Mansfield Town | 141 | (3) |
| 1994–2002 | Huddersfield Town | 230 | (6) |
| 2000 | → Stockport County (loan) | 1 | (0) |
| 2002–2003 | Tranmere Rovers | 12 | (1) |
| 2003–2007 | Carlisle United | 130 | (11) |
| 2007–2008 | Chesterfield | 15 | (0) |
| 2008–2009 | Workington | 0 | (0) |
| Total | | 529 | (21) |
- * Club domestic league appearances and goals

Kevin John Gray (born 7 January 1972) is an English former footballer, who played as a defender in the Football League for Mansfield Town, Huddersfield Town, Stockport County (on loan), Tranmere Rovers, Carlisle United and Chesterfield.

== Football career ==
He started his career at Mansfield Town signing as a trainee in July 1990 and had a successful four-year period at Mansfield. In 1994 Gray joined Huddersfield Town at the newly built Galpharm Stadium and played there for eight years and played just under 300 games for Huddersfield and he played one game on loan at Stockport County in 2000.

While at Huddersfield, Gray tackled Bradford City striker Gordon Watson in February 1997, the sliding tackle broke Watson's leg in two places and left his career in tatters. Out injured for 16 months, Watson was never the same player. Watson successfully sued Gray for negligence and was awarded £50,000 in interim damages. as well as a latter £900,000, the bulk of which was to compensate for the loss of anticipated earnings.

Then he joined Tranmere Rovers in 2002 where he had a nightmare spell playing just 18 games in 16 months. He scored once during his spell at Tranmere; his goal being the winner against former club Huddersfield Town.

In November 2003, he joined Carlisle United where he had a successful spell, playing a major part in the Conference and League Two successes and captaining the club. He was released in May 2007.

Gray was signed for Workington in July 2008 but didn't play any competitive games after he picked up a knee injury. Gray left at the end of the season after which he retired from football.

== Honours ==
Carlisle United

- Football League Two: 2005–06
- Football League Trophy runner-up: 2005–06
