= Ben Thornley =

English footballer (born 1975)

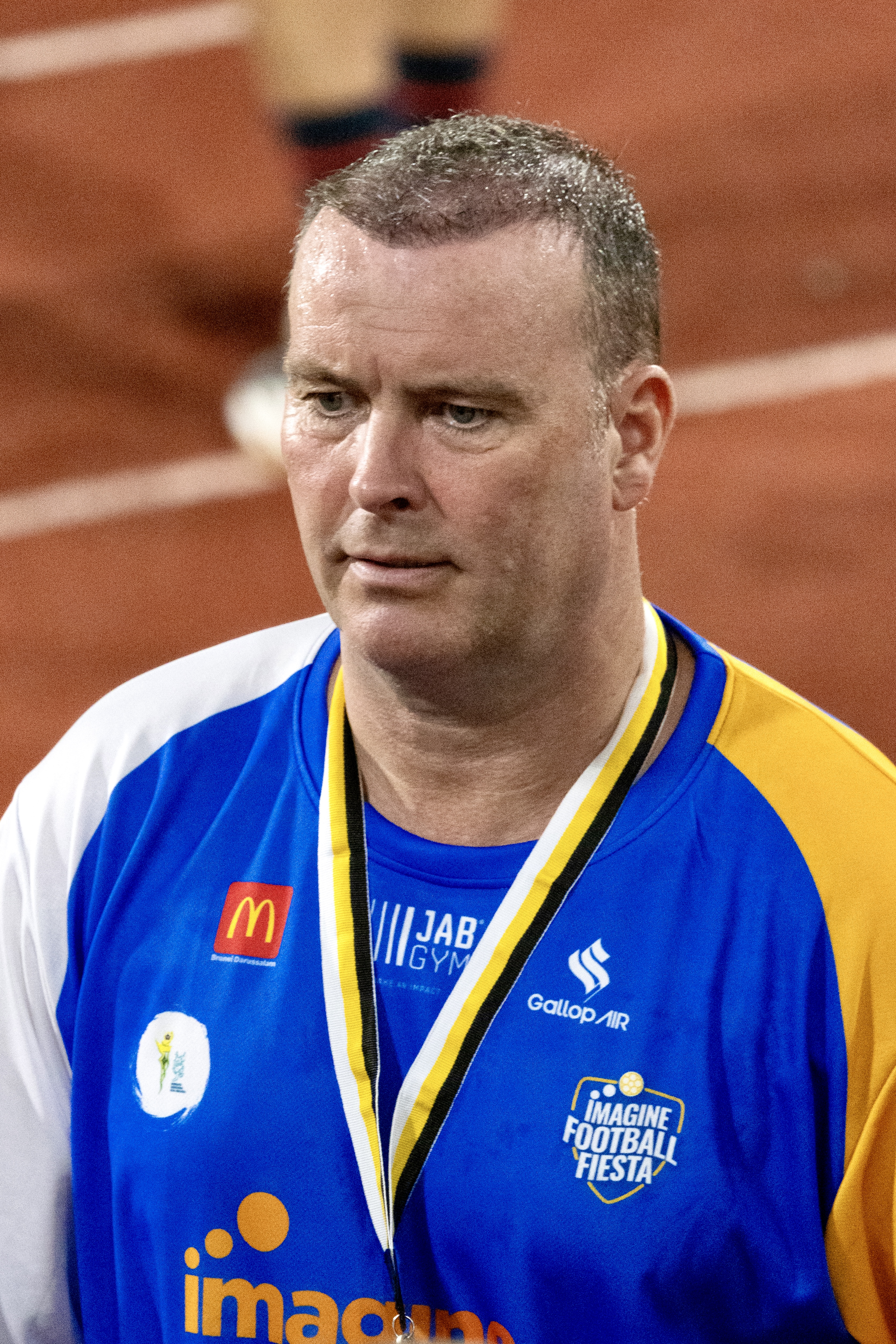
- Thornley in 2024

Personal information
- Full name: Benjamin Lindsay Thornley
- Date of birth: 21 April 1975 (age 51)
- Place of birth: Bury, England
- Height: 5 ft 8 in (1.73 m)
- Position: Winger

Senior career*
Years	Team	Apps	(Gls)
1993–1998	Manchester United	9	(0)
1995	→ Stockport County (loan)	10	(1)
1996	→ Huddersfield Town (loan)	12	(2)
1998–2001	Huddersfield Town	99	(5)
2001–2002	Aberdeen	30	(3)
2002–2003	Blackpool	12	(0)
2003–2004	Bury	5	(0)
2004	Halifax Town	3	(0)
2005–2006	Bacup Borough	?	(?)
2006–2007	Salford City	?	(?)
2007–2008	Wilmslow Albion	?	(?)
2008–2010	Witton Albion	?	(?)
Total		180+	(11+)

International career
1996	England U21	3	(0)
- * Club domestic league appearances and goals

Benjamin Lindsay Thornley (born 21 April 1975) is an English former professional footballer and sports commentator.

As a player, he was a winger who notably played in the Premier League for Manchester United, although making nine league appearances over a five-year stay. He also played in the Football League for Stockport County, Huddersfield Town, Blackpool and Bury, and in the Scottish Premier League for Aberdeen. He finished his playing days in non-league football with Halifax Town, Bacup Borough, Salford City, Wilmslow Albion and Witton Albion. He was capped three times by the England U21 team.

Thornley now works in media and is a sports commentator for MUTV.

== Playing career ==
=== Manchester United ===
Thornley was born at Fairfield General Hospital in Bury, Greater Manchester. He is most widely known for his career as a youth and reserve team player at Manchester United, where he played in the left wing position from 1991 to 1998 (becoming a professional in 1992 after helping United win the FA Youth Cup) but was occasionally used as a striker.

Thornley made his debut for United on 26 February 1994 as a substitute in the Premier League match against West Ham United which ended in a 2–2 draw at Boleyn Ground.

A quick and tricky right-footed left winger, he was highly regarded by Alex Ferguson and at one point was expected to become a regular player at Old Trafford. Although he did make nine league appearances for United, serious injury and increasing competition for places prevented him from making the expected impact at first-team level. The most notable injury came in April 1994, when he suffered knee ligament damage in a reserve match against Blackburn Rovers due to a reckless tackle by opposing defender Nicky Marker; the injury kept him out of action for over a year. This came days before the FA Cup semi-final against Oldham Athletic, for which Alex Ferguson was reportedly considering selecting Thornley (at least for a place on the bench) in case Ryan Giggs was not fully fit. Thornley was not fit again until the start of the 1995–96 season. He was rated by contemporaries including David Beckham (one of the players who went on to eclipse him in the first team), as well as club legend and former youth coach Nobby Stiles, as one of the finest young players at the club during that era.

In 1997, Thornley sued Marker and Blackburn Rovers for millions over the tackle, claiming a loss of earnings that resulted from him being kept out of the Manchester United first team because of the injury.

In 1996, he won three caps for England at U-21 level.

=== Huddersfield Town ===
After loan spells at Stockport County and Huddersfield Town, Thornley finally left United on a free transfer in May 1998 and went on to make 127 appearances for Huddersfield Town, scoring 8 goals and helping them come close to a First Division play-off place – and the chance of a place in the FA Premier League. From June 1999 until November 2000, he was playing under former Manchester United teammate Steve Bruce, who was Huddersfield's manager. When Bruce was dismissed, his successor was another former Manchester United player – Lou Macari, who had left United before Thornley joined them.

Thornley's spell at Huddersfield brought mixed fortunes. In his first season they finished 10th in the First Division and in his second they finished eighth (being in contention for a play-off place right up to the last match of the season), but in his final campaign they suffered relegation to the Second Division.

=== Aberdeen ===
In August 2001 he signed a two-year deal at Aberdeen, which gave him another crack at top division football – this time north of the border in the Scottish Premier League. In 30 appearances for Aberdeen, he scored three goals – the opening goal in a 4–2 victory against Motherwell, and both goals in a 2–0 victory over Kilmarnock. He also scored in the Scottish Cup against St Johnstone, and in the Scottish League Cup against Queen of the South.

=== Later career ===
He returned to England and signed for Second Division club Blackpool on an 18-month contract in November 2002, but was released from his contract at the end of the 2002–03 season.

Thornley signed for Bury in September 2003, but was released less than two months later after making just five appearances. He then joined Halifax Town on non-contract terms in March 2004, ending his professional career just before his 29th birthday to play in the Conference.

He then joined the non-League scene with Bacup Borough where he was joined by former Manchester United teammate David May. He joined Salford City at the beginning of 2006.

Alongside his younger brother, Rod, a striker, Thornley played for Witton Albion in the Northern Premier League between 2008 and 2010.

== Personal life and Post-playing career ==
His younger brother, Rod Thornley, also a former academy player at Manchester United, used to be a sports therapist at the club. Thornley now works as a television commentator for MUTV.

== Honours ==
Manchester United

- FA Youth Cup: 1991–92
- FA Charity Shield: 1997
