= Thomas Heary =

Irish footballer (born 1979)

Personal information
- Full name: Thomas Heary
- Date of birth: 14 February 1979 (age 47)
- Place of birth: Dublin, Republic of Ireland
- Position: Defender

Youth career
- 1995: Huddersfield Town

Senior career*
Years	Team	Apps	(Gls)
1996–2002	Huddersfield Town	92	(0)
2003–2008	Bohemians	99	(2)
2009	Dundalk	31	(0)
2010	Galway United	14	(0)
2010	Limerick	7	(0)

International career
1999	Republic of Ireland U-21	4	(0)
- * Club domestic league appearances and goals

Thomas Heary (born 14 February 1979 in Dublin) is an Irish football player, who last played for Limerick. He is the younger brother of Owen Heary, Bohemians player and club captain.

== Career ==
=== Huddersfield Town ===
Heary signed for Huddersfield Town as a youth in 1995.

He made his senior debut the following September in a First Division match, coming off the bench late on to replace Sam Collins in his team's 1–0 home victory against Reading.

During the remainder of the 1996/97 season, Heary made five further appearances as the Terriers avoided relegation.

Between the start of the 1997/98 and the end of the 1999/2000 season, Heary made just eight further appearances in all competitions.

One of Heary's better seasons for Huddersfield was to come in the 2000/01 season. He made 31 appearances in all competitions but was unable to help save the club from relegation to the Second Division.

The following season, Heary made 43 appearances in all competitions of the 2001/02 campaign, with Huddersfield narrowly missing out on promotion after losing to Brentford in the play-off semi-finals.

In the 2002/03 season, he made 21 appearances in all competitions, but Huddersfield were relegated to the Third Division. In the summer of 2003, Heary left the Galpharm Stadium and returned to his native Ireland to join Bohemians.

=== Bohemians ===
Arriving in May 2003, Heary impressed in defence and midfield during his time at Dalymount Park.

In July 2003, Heary played in both legs of the UEFA Champions League First Qualifying Round, as Bohemians beat BATE Borisov 3–1 over two legs. He also played in both legs of the Second Qualifying Round as Bohemians were defeated 5–0 over the two legs by Rosenborg. Heary played in both legs of the UEFA Cup First Qualifying Round the following season, as Bohemians were beaten 3–1 over two legs by Levadia Tallinn.

Heary was injured on the first day of the 2005 season against Shamrock Rovers and missed almost the entire campaign. The next two years were spent mostly on the sidelines, suffering numerous setbacks. After Bohemians' double-winning 2008 season, he left to join his former manager Sean Connor at newly promoted Dundalk.

=== Dundalk ===
Heary joined Dundalk in January 2009 and was appointed club captain by Sean Connor for the 2009 season.

=== Galway United ===
Heary re-joined Sean Connor before the start of the 2010 League of Ireland season, signing for Galway United, having spent most of pre-season there. Heary only made 14 appearances for the club before moving on.

=== Limerick ===
Heary joined Limerick in July 2010. He only made 7 appearances for the club.

== International career ==
Heary played for the Republic of Ireland national under-19 football team in the 1997 UEFA European Under-18 Championship finals in Iceland. Heary was never capped at senior international level, but earned four caps for the U-21 team. He also played in the 1999 FIFA World Youth Championship, which took place in Nigeria.

Heary played every minute of Ireland's four games in the competition.

Ireland lost the first group match 1–0 to Mexico, but beat Saudi Arabia 2–0 in the second group match and thrashed Australia 4–0 in the third and final group match.

In the round of 16, Ireland faced hosts Nigeria. Richard Sadlier gave Ireland the lead in the first-half but Pius Ikedia equalised for Nigeria with about 20 minutes remaining. The score remained 1–1 after extra-time, but Ireland lost 5–3 on penalties.

Heary also played in and won the UEFA European Under-19 Championship with Ireland in 1998.

== Honours ==
Bohemians

- League of Ireland (1): 2008
- FAI Cup (1): 2008

=== Republic of Ireland ===
- UEFA European Under-19 Championship (1): 1998
