= Steve Jenkins =

Welsh football manager and former player (born 1972)

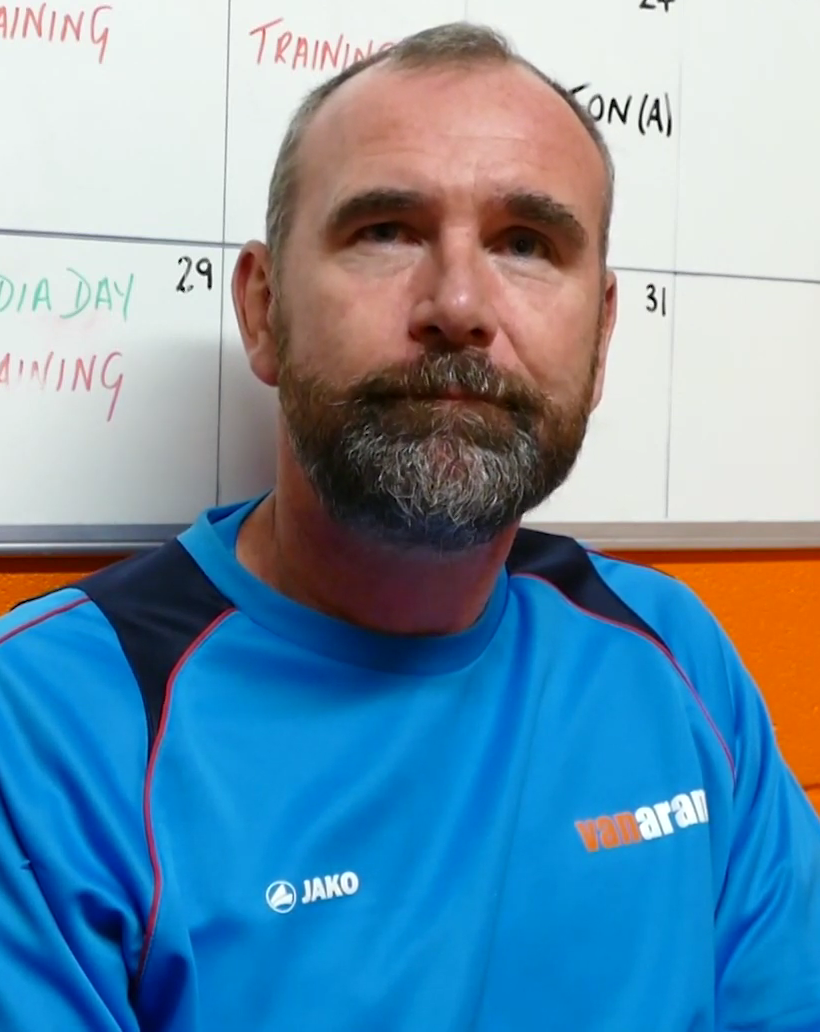
- Jenkins in October 2020

Personal information
- Full name: Stephen Robert Jenkins
- Date of birth: 16 July 1972 (age 54)
- Place of birth: Merthyr Tydfil, Wales
- Height: 5 ft 10 in (1.78 m)
- Position: Defender

Team information
- Current team: Barry Town (Manager)

Senior career*
Years	Team	Apps	(Gls)
1990–1995	Swansea City	165	(1)
1995–2003	Huddersfield Town	258	(4)
2000–2001	→ Birmingham City (loan)	3	(0)
2003	Cardiff City	4	(0)
2003–2004	Notts County	17	(0)
2004	Peterborough United	14	(1)
2004	→ Swindon Town (loan)	4	(0)
2004–2006	Swindon Town	44	(1)
2006	Worcester City	10	(0)
2006–2009	Newport County	83	(0)
2009–2012	Llanelli	13	(1)

International career
1995–2001	Wales	16	(0)

Managerial career
- 2009–2013: Llanelli (assistant)
- 2013–2014: Monmouth Town
- 2014: Hereford United (assistant)
- 2014–2016: Merthyr Town
- 2016–2018: Hereford (assistant)
- 2020: Barnet (assistant)
- 2021-2023: Cardiff City (U18s coach)
- 2023–: Barry Town
- * Club domestic league appearances and goals

Stephen Robert Jenkins (born 16 July 1972) is a former Wales international footballer and the current Barry Town Manager. A full back as a player, he won 16 Welsh caps between 1995 and 2001.

He began his career at Swansea, where he was a part of the team that won the 1994 Football League Trophy Final after a penalty shootout. After a seven-year spell at Huddersfield Town, in which he became the captain but a well established fans' favourite, Jenkins signed for Swindon Town in 2005, but after Swindon's relegation to League Two and the appointment of Dennis Wise as manager, Jenkins' offer of a new deal at the County Ground was withdrawn and he was released. He spent three years playing for and latterly coaching Newport County, before joining Llanelli as player/assistant manager to Andy Legg in May 2009.

In June 2013 Jenkins was appointed manager of Monmouth Town.

On 20 March 2014 Jenkins was appointed assistant manager to Peter Beadle at Hereford United. Hereford ended the 2013–14 season in 20th place, finishing above the relegation zone on goal difference after beating Aldershot Town on the final day of the season.

On 23 May 2014, Jenkins was appointed as manager of his home town club Merthyr Town.

On 30 May 2016, Jenkins was confirmed as Hereford's assistant manager. He left the role on 13 September 2018.

On 4 September 2020, Jenkins joined Barnet, once again as assistant to Beadle. He left the club on 18 December, shortly after Beadle's departure.

On 5 August 2023, one week before the start of the 2023–24 Cymru Premier season, Jenkins was confirmed as the new manager of promoted Barry Town, replacing the departed Lee Kendall.

== Honours ==
Swansea City

- Football League Trophy: 1993–94
