= Jamie Vincent =

English footballer (1975–2022)

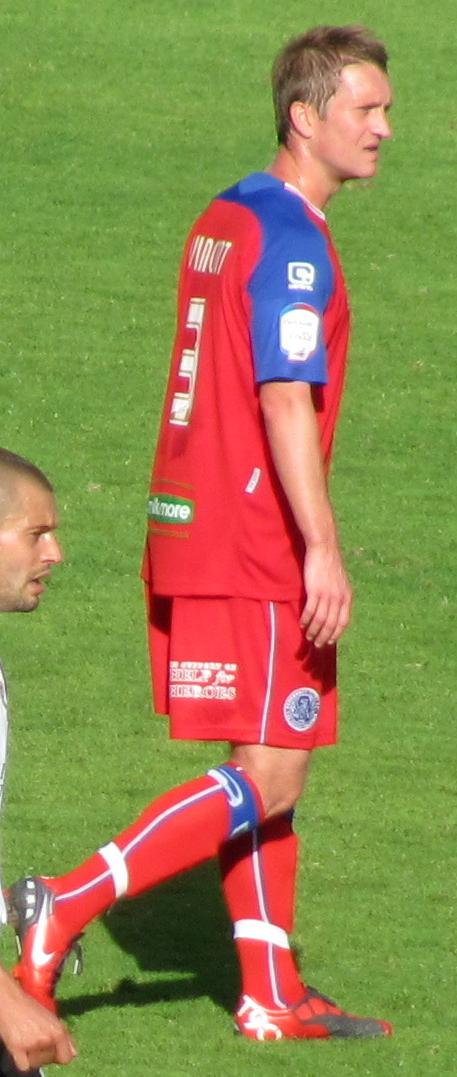
- Vincent in action for Aldershot against Port Vale at Vale Park, 2010

Personal information
- Full name: Jamie Roy Vincent
- Date of birth: 18 June 1975
- Place of birth: Wimbledon, London, England
- Date of death: 18 January 2022 (aged 46)
- Height: 5 ft 10 in (1.78 m)
- Position: Defender

Youth career
- Wimbledon

Senior career*
Years	Team	Apps	(Gls)
1993–1996	Crystal Palace	25	(0)
1994–1995	→ AFC Bournemouth (loan)	8	(0)
1996–1999	AFC Bournemouth	107	(5)
1999–2001	Huddersfield Town	59	(2)
2001–2004	Portsmouth	48	(1)
2003–2004	→ Walsall (loan)	12	(0)
2004–2005	Derby County	22	(2)
2005–2006	Millwall	15	(0)
2006	Yeovil Town	0	(0)
2006	→ Millwall (loan)	4	(0)
2006–2009	Swindon Town	84	(0)
2009–2010	Walsall	38	(0)
2010–2011	Aldershot Town	24	(1)
2011–2012	Didcot Town	1	(0)
Total		447	(11)
- * Club domestic league appearances and goals

Jamie Roy Vincent (18 June 1975 – 18 January 2022) was an English professional footballer who played as a defender.

== Career ==
Vincent was spotted by Mick Beard then Wimbledon where he played most of his youth football, before he began his career with Crystal Palace. At Palace he scored his first professional goal in a League Cup game against Southend United in October 1995. However, after a successful loan period at AFC Bournemouth, he signed and made over 100 league starts.

Later he moved to Huddersfield Town for £500,000 before being sold on to Portsmouth for £800,000, where he scored once against Barnsley. He subsequently moved to Derby County and Yeovil Town. In the summer of 2006, he was signed to Swindon Town by Dennis Wise who he had previously played for at Millwall. Under the subsequent management of Paul Sturrock, he was given the vice-captaincy. In July 2009, Vincent signed a one-year deal with league one club Walsall. He signed a new contract with Walsall in June 2010, but after discussions with the club he was released from his contract as he wanted to play for a club nearer to his home in Berkshire. In July 2010, Vincent signed a one-year contract with League Two side Aldershot Town.

Vincent died on 16 January 2022, at the age of 46.

== Honours ==
Bournemouth

- Football League Trophy runner-up: 1997–98

Individual

- PFA Team of the Year: 1998–99 Second Division
- Huddersfield Town Player of the Year: 2000
