= Nico Vaesen =

Belgian footballer

Personal information
- Full name: Nico-Jos Theodoor Vaesen
- Date of birth: 28 September 1969 (age 57)
- Place of birth: Hasselt, Belgium
- Height: 1.91 m (6 ft 3 in)
- Position: Goalkeeper

Senior career*
Years	Team	Apps	(Gls)
1990–1993	Tongeren		
1993–1995	Cercle Brugge	16	(0)
1995–1998	K.S.C. Eendracht Aalst	34	(0)
1998–2001	Huddersfield Town	135	(0)
2001–2006	Birmingham City	54	(0)
2003–2004	→ Gillingham (loan)	5	(0)
2004	→ Bradford City (loan)	6	(0)
2004	→ Crystal Palace (loan)	10	(0)
2006	Lierse	11	(0)
2008	K.F.C. Verbroedering Geel		
- * Club domestic league appearances and goals

Nico-Jos Theodoor Vaesen (born 28 September 1969) is a Belgian former footballer who played as a goalkeeper. He retired from football shortly after joining Lierse, but returned to the game in 2008 with K.F.C. Verbroedering Geel for one season where his contract wasn't renewed.

== Career ==
Born in Hasselt, Belgium, Vaesen spent his first professional season at Belgian sides Cercle Brugge and K.S.C. Eendracht Aalst, and on 21 May 1998 moved to English side Huddersfield Town. He was sent off on his debut, but went on to play 135 league games. During his first season for the club, he won the club's Supporters' Player of the Year. After three years at Huddersfield, on 18 June 2001, he signed for Birmingham City.

He was given the first-choice goalkeeper role at Birmingham, helping the club win promotion to the Premier League via the play-offs in 2002. A memorable moment in the promotion season was saving a Gary Holt penalty in a 1–0 over Norwich City. Birmingham would go on to meet Norwich again in the play-off final and this time Vaesen saved from Philip Mulryne in the shootout. However a cruciate knee injury in March 2003 put him out of the game for nine months. During this time Maik Taylor was brought in and established himself as first-choice goalkeeper. On Christmas Eve 2003, he was loaned to Gillingham for one and a half months, during which time he participated in five games. Spells at Bradford City and Crystal Palace, with whom he took part in another play-off final victory, followed in 2004. At the end of that season he signed a new two-year contract with Birmingham, intending to compete for a first-team place. He finally dislodged Taylor in late 2005, but a 4–1 defeat at Manchester City, in which he conceded a penalty and was later sent off, proved to be his last first-team appearance before he was released at the end of the 2005–06 season due to Birmingham's relegation.

He then moved to Belgian side Lierse, but has since retired. In January 2008, he changed his mind and made a contract with K.F.C. Verbroedering Geel.

== Honours ==
Birmingham City

- Football League First Division play-offs: 2002

Crystal Palace

- Football League First Division play-offs: 2004
