= List of Bury F.C. seasons =

Bury performances from 1894 until 2019

Bury Football Club is an English association football club based in the town of Bury, which was in Lancashire until 1974 when it was absorbed into Greater Manchester. Founded in 1885, Bury first entered the FA Cup in 1887–88. Drawn to play Blackburn Rovers away from home, they travelled to Ewood Park but scratched before the game; the two teams played a friendly match instead, which Bury lost heavily. (Note: Some sources, e.g. the Rec.Sport.Soccer Statistics Foundation (RSSSF), record this fixture as a first-round FA Cup tie. However, the Football Association lists the result as a walkover to Blackburn, the Blackburn Standard reported that "as the [Bury] team was composed of more than one player who was ineligible they scratched previous to going on the field, and consequently an ordinary game was contested" which Rovers won 10–0, and Bury F.C. do not include it in their complete FA Cup record.) The team first contested an FA Cup match in 1891–92: they beat Witton and Heywood Central before losing to Blackpool after a replay in the third qualifying round.

Bury were founder members of and runners-up in the Lancashire League in 1889–90, and won the title in their second and third seasons. They were elected to the Football League ahead of the 1893–94 season, won the Second Division title that same season by a nine-point margin, and beat Liverpool, the First Division's bottom club, in the test match to gain promotion. They retained their top-flight status for 17 seasons. During that period Bury twice won the FA Cup. In the 1900 final, they beat Southern League team Southampton by four goals to nil. Three years later, they did not concede a goal in any round as they went on to beat Derby County 6–0, which remains the joint widest winning margin in an FA Cup final with Manchester City's 6-0 win over Watford in the 2019 edition. The ball used in that match is on display at the National Football Museum.

They returned to the First Division for a five-season spell in the mid-1920s, and achieved their highest ever finish, of fourth place, in 1925–26. Relegated back to the Second in 1929, Bury did not play in the top flight again; the closest they came was a third place in 1936–37. They flirted with relegation all through the 1950s, finally dropping into the Third Division North for the first time in the club's history in that league's last season before the regional sections were amalgamated into national Third and Fourth Divisions in 1958. Returning to the Second Division as Third Division champions in 1961, Bury spent seven of the next eight seasons at that level. In 1962–63, they reached the semi-final of the Football League Cup, losing 4–3 on aggregate to eventual winners Birmingham City. By 1971 Bury were in the Fourth Division, only for a three-season spell, but they were to spend the first half of the 1980s at that level.

Further spells in the third and fourth tiers preceded two successive promotions in the mid-1990s: third place in Division Three – after the Premier League broke away from the Football League in 1992, the divisions were renumbered – followed by the Division Two title in 1996–97 brought Bury to the second tier for the first time in forty years. After two seasons they were relegated, and by 2002, financial problems brought the club into administration and to the brink of folding. A supporters' campaign raised enough money to keep the club afloat, and in recognition of his role within that process, UEFA presented club press officer Gordon Sorfleet with their Best Supporter award for 2002. Bury were relegated at the end of that season, and then yo-yoed between the third and fourth tiers. Promoted to League One in 2019 against a background of increasingly damaging financial and ownership issues, Bury's early fixtures in the 2019–20 season were successively postponed until, on 27 August 2019, after 125 years continuous membership, the club was expelled from the Football League. A phoenix club, Bury AFC, joined the North West Counties League First Division North for the 2021–22 season and won that division the following year. Meanwhile, the entity that was Bury F.C. still existed, and the two merged in 2023, restoring the Bury F.C. playing name and combining the two teams' histories.

Before the club's expulsion from the Football League, Bury spent 22 seasons in the top tier of the English football league system, 39 in the second, 29 in the third and 24 in the fourth. The table details the team's achievements in senior first-team competitions and records the top scorer in league matches for each season since they first entered the FA Cup in 1887–88.

== Key ==
Key to league record:

- P – Played
- W – Games won
- D – Games drawn
- L – Games lost
- F – Goals for
- A – Goals against
- Pts – Points
- Pos – Final position

Key to colours and symbols:
Symbol	Meaning
1st or W	Winners
2nd or F	Runners-up
↑	Promoted
↓	Relegated
†	Expelled
♦	Top league scorer in Bury's division

Key to divisions:

- Lancs – Lancashire League
- Div 1 – Football League First Division
- Div 2 – Football League Second Division
- Div 3 – Football League Third Division
- Div 4 – Football League Fourth Division
- League 1 – Football League One, EFL League One
- League 2 – Football League Two, EFL League Two
- NWC D1N – North West Counties League Division One North
- NWC P – North West Counties League Premier Division

Key to rounds:

- Group – Group stage
- Prelim – Preliminary round
- QR3 – Third qualifying round
- QR4 – Fourth qualifying round
- R1 – First round
- R2 – Second round, etc.
- QF – Quarter-final
- SF – Semi-final
- F – Final
- W – Winners
- (N) – Northern section of regionalised stage
- DNE – Did not enter
- Scr – Scratched
- DQ – Disqualified
- Exp – Expelled

Details of the abandoned 1939–40 Football League and 2020–21 North West Counties League seasons are shown in italics and appropriately footnoted.

== Seasons ==
List of seasons, including league division and statistics, cup results and top scorer(s)
Season	League									FA Cup (Note: Beginning with the 1925–26 season, the FA Cup was structured so that the third round proper contained 64 teams. Prior to that date, the structure had varied, so rounds are not directly comparable to the round of the same name after 1925. For example, in 1899–1900 and 1902–03, when Bury won the competition, there were only three rounds proper before the semifinal, as compared with the current six.)	League Cup (Note: The League Cup competition started in the 1960–61 season.)	Other		Top league scorer(s) (Note: Sourced to Soccerbase for 1996–97 to 2018–19.)	
Season	Division (Note: From the 1894–95 Football League season onwards, divisions are sorted according to their level within the English football league system, and separately from the pre-Football League division.)	P	W	D	L	F	A	Pts	Pos	FA Cup	League Cup	Competition	Result	Name	Goals
1887–88	—	—	—	—	—	—	—	—	—	Scr	—	—	—	—	—
1888–89	—	—	—	—	—	—	—	—	—	DNE	—	—	—	—	—
1889–90	Lancs	24	14	3	7	65	35	31	2nd	DNE	—	—	—	Not known	—
1890–91	Lancs	20	15	3	2	74	32	33	1st	DNE	—	—	—	Not known	—
1891–92	Lancs	22	20	0	2	76	20	40	1st	QR3	—	—	—	Not known	—
1892–93	Lancs	22	17	1	4	83	24	35	3rd	QR3	—	—	—	Not known	—
1893–94	Lancs	22	13	4	5	85	35	30	2nd	QR4	—	—	—	Not known	—
1894–95	Div 2 ↑	30	23	2	5	78	33	48	1st	R2	—	—	—	Harry Millar	17
1895–96	Div 1	30	12	3	15	50	54	27	11th	R3	—	—	—	Jack Plant, James Henderson	8
1896–97	Div 1	30	10	10	10	39	44	30	9th	R2	—	—	—	Not known	—
1897–98	Div 1	30	8	8	14	39	51	24	14th	R1	—	—	—	Not known	—
1898–99	Div 1	34	14	7	13	48	49	35	10th	R2	—	—	—	Not known	—
1899–1900	Div 1	34	13	6	15	40	44	32	12th	W	—	—	—	Not known	—
1900–01	Div 1	34	16	7	11	53	37	39	5th	R2	—	—	—	Not known	—
1901–02	Div 1	34	13	8	13	44	38	34	7th	R3	—	—	—	Not known	—
1902–03	Div 1	34	16	3	15	54	43	35	8th	W	—	—	—	Not known	—
1903–04	Div 1	34	7	15	12	40	53	29	12th	R2	—	—	—	Not known	—
1904–05	Div 1	34	10	4	20	47	67	24	17th	R2	—	—	—	Not known	—
1905–06	Div 1	38	11	10	17	57	74	32	17th	R1	—	—	—	Not known	—
1906–07	Div 1	38	13	6	19	58	68	32	16th	R3	—	—	—	Not known	—
1907–08	Div 1	38	14	11	13	58	61	39	7th	R2	—	—	—	Not known	—
1908–09	Div 1	38	14	8	16	63	77	36	17th	R2	—	—	—	Not known	—
1909–10	Div 1	38	12	9	17	62	66	33	13th	R2	—	—	—	Not known	—
1910–11	Div 1	38	9	11	18	43	71	29	18th	R1	—	—	—	Not known	—
1911–12	Div 1 ↓	38	6	9	23	32	59	21	20th	R2	—	—	—	Not known	—
1912–13	Div 2	38	15	8	15	53	57	38	11th	R2	—	—	—	Not known	—
1913–14	Div 2	38	15	10	13	39	40	40	10th	R2	—	—	—	Not known	—
1914–15 (Note: At the end of the 1914–15 season, the Football League and FA Cup were suspended for the duration of the First World War.)	Div 2	38	15	8	15	61	56	38	11th	R2	—	—	—	Not known	—
1919–20	Div 2	42	20	8	14	60	44	48	5th	R2	—	—	—	Not known	—
1920–21	Div 2	42	15	10	17	45	49	40	11th	R1	—	—	—	Not known	—
1921–22	Div 2	42	15	10	17	54	55	40	11th	R1	—	—	—	Not known	—
1922–23	Div 2	42	18	11	13	55	46	47	6th	R3	—	—	—	Not known	—
1923–24	Div 2 ↑	42	21	9	12	63	35	51	2nd	R1	—	—	—	Not known	—
1924–25	Div 1	42	17	15	10	54	51	49	5th	R1	—	—	—	Not known	—
1925–26	Div 1	42	20	7	15	85	77	47	4th	R4	—	—	—	Norman Bullock	31
1926–27	Div 1	42	12	12	18	68	77	36	19th	R3	—	—	—	Not known	—
1927–28	Div 1	42	20	4	18	80	80	44	5th	R4	—	—	—	Not known	—
1928–29	Div 1 ↓	42	12	7	23	62	99	31	21st	R5	—	—	—	Not known	—
1929–30	Div 2	42	22	5	15	78	67	49	5th	R3	—	—	—	Not known	—
1930–31	Div 2	42	19	3	20	75	82	41	13th	R4	—	—	—	Not known	—
1931–32	Div 2	42	21	7	14	70	58	49	5th	QF	—	—	—	Not known	—
1932–33	Div 2	42	20	9	13	84	59	49	4th	R4	—	—	—	Not known	—
1933–34	Div 2	42	17	9	16	70	73	43	12th	R4	—	—	—	Not known	—
1934–35	Div 2	42	19	4	19	62	73	42	10th	R3	—	—	—	Not known	—
1935–36	Div 2	42	13	12	17	66	84	38	14th	R4	—	—	—	Not known	—
1936–37	Div 2	42	22	8	12	74	55	52	3rd	R4	—	—	—	Not known	—
1937–38	Div 2	42	18	5	19	63	60	41	10th	R4	—	—	—	Not known	—
1938–39	Div 2	42	12	13	17	65	74	37	16th	R3	—	—	—	Not known	—
1939–40 (Note: The 1939–40 Football League season was abandoned with three matches played when the Second World War began, and the Football League and FA Cup remained suspended for the duration.)	Div 2	3	1	1	1	4	5	3	—	—	—	—	—	four players (Note: Four players, Reg Halton, Jack Kelly, John McNeill and Fred Roberts each scored once before the 1939–40 season was abandoned.)	1
1945–46	—	—	—	—	—	—	—	—	—	R4 (Note: Although the Football League did not resume until the 1946–47 season, the FA Cup was contested in 1945–46. From the first round proper to the sixth round (quarter-final), results were determined on aggregate score over two legs.)	—	—	—	Not known	—
1946–47	Div 2	42	12	12	18	80	78	36	17th	R3	—	—	—	Not known	—
1947–48	Div 2	42	9	16	17	58	68	34	20th	R3	—	—	—	Not known	—
1948–49	Div 2	42	17	6	19	67	76	40	12th	R3	—	—	—	Not known	—
1949–50	Div 2	42	14	9	19	60	65	37	18th	R4	—	—	—	Not known	—
1950–51	Div 2	42	12	8	22	60	86	32	20th	R3	—	—	—	Not known	—
1951–52	Div 2	42	15	7	20	67	69	37	17th	R3	—	—	—	Not known	—
1952–53	Div 2	42	13	9	20	53	81	35	20th	R4	—	—	—	Not known	—
1953–54	Div 2	42	11	14	17	54	72	36	17th	R3	—	—	—	Not known	—
1954–55	Div 2	42	15	11	16	77	72	41	13th	R3	—	—	—	Not known	—
1955–56	Div 2	42	16	8	18	86	90	40	15th	R3	—	—	—	Not known	—
1956–57	Div 2 ↓	42	8	9	25	60	96	25	21st	R3	—	—	—	Not known	—
1957–58	Div 3N	46	23	10	13	94	62	56	4th	R2	—	—	—	Not known	—
1958–59	Div 3	46	17	14	15	69	58	48	10th	R3	—	—	—	Not known	—
1959–60	Div 3	46	21	9	16	64	51	51	7th	R3	—	—	—	Not known	—
1960–61	Div 3 ↑	46	30	8	8	108	45	68	1st	R1	R3^{[A]}	—	—	Not known	—
1961–62	Div 2	42	17	5	20	52	76	39	18th	R3	R2	—	—	Not known	—
1962–63	Div 2	42	18	11	13	51	47	47	8th	R4	SF	—	—	Not known	—
1963–64	Div 2	42	13	9	20	57	73	35	18th	R4	R2	—	—	Not known	—
1964–65	Div 2	42	14	10	18	60	66	38	16th	R3	R3	—	—	Not known	—
1965–66	Div 2	42	14	7	21	62	76	35	19th	R3	R2	—	—	Not known	—
1966–67	Div 2 ↓	42	11	6	25	49	83	28	22nd	R4	R2	—	—	Not known	—
1967–68	Div 3 ↑	46	24	8	14	91	66	56	2nd	R3	R3	—	—	Not known	—
1968–69	Div 2 ↓	42	11	8	23	51	80	30	21st	R3	R1	—	—	Not known	—
1969–70	Div 3	46	15	11	20	75	80	41	19th	R1	R2	—	—	George Jones	26 ♦
1970–71	Div 3 ↓	46	12	13	21	52	60	37	22nd	R2	R1	—	—	Not known	—
1971–72	Div 4	46	19	12	15	73	59	50	9th	R3	R1	—	—	Not known	—
1972–73	Div 4	46	14	18	14	58	51	46	12th	R1	R4	—	—	Not known	—
1973–74	Div 4 ↑	46	24	11	11	81	49	59	4th	R1	R3	—	—	Not known	—
1974–75	Div 3	46	16	12	18	53	50	44	14th	R4	R3	—	—	Not known	—
1975–76	Div 3	46	14	16	16	51	46	44	13th	R4	R2	—	—	Andy Rowland	16
1976–77	Div 3	46	23	8	15	64	59	54	7th	R2	R3	—	—	Andy Rowland	17
1977–78	Div 3	46	13	19	14	62	56	45	15th	R1	QF	—	—	Andy Rowland	14
1978–79	Div 3	46	11	20	15	59	65	42	19th	R3	R1	—	—	Ken Beamish	16
1979–80	Div 3 ↓	46	16	7	23	45	59	39	21st	R5	R1	Anglo-Scottish Cup	Group	Craig Madden	10
1980–81	Div 4	46	17	11	18	70	62	45	12th	R3	R3	Anglo-Scottish Cup	SF	Not known	—
1981–82	Div 4	46	17	17	12	80	59	68 (Note: The 1981–82 season saw the introduction of three points for a win instead of two.)	9th	R2	R1	Football League Group Cup (Note: The Football League Group Cup succeeded the Anglo-Scottish Cup after the Scottish clubs decided to abandon the competition.)	Group	Craig Madden	35
1982–83	Div 4	46	23	12	11	74	46	81	5th	R1	R1	—	—	Not known	—
1983–84	Div 4	46	15	14	17	61	64	59	15th	R2	R2	Associate Members' Cup	R1(N)	Not known	—
1984–85	Div 4 ↑	46	24	12	10	76	50	84	4th	R1	R1	Associate Members' Cup	R2(N)	Not known	—
1985–86	Div 3	46	12	13	21	63	67	49	20th	R5	R2	Associate Members' Cup	Prelim(N)	Not known	—
1986–87	Div 3	46	14	13	19	54	60	55	16th	R1	R2	Associate Members' Cup	QF	Nigel Greenwood	14
1987–88	Div 3	46	15	14	17	58	57	59	14th	R1	R4	Associate Members' Cup	QF(N)	Not known	—
1988–89	Div 3	46	16	13	17	55	67	61	13th	R2	R2	Associate Members' Cup	Prelim(N)	Not known	—
1989–90	Div 3	46	21	11	14	70	49	74	5th (Note: Bury lost 2–0 on aggregate to Tranmere Rovers in the play-off semi-final.)	R1	R1	Associate Members' Cup	R1(N)	Liam Robinson	17
1990–91	Div 3	46	20	13	13	67	56	73	7th (Note: Bury lost 2–1 on aggregate to Bolton Wanderers in the play-off semi-final.)	R1	R1	Associate Members' Cup	QF(N)	Not known	—
1991–92	Div 3 ↓	46	13	12	21	55	74	51	21st	R1	R1	Associate Members' Cup	QF(N)	Not known	—
1992–93	Div 3 (Note: When the newly formed FA Premier League split from the Football League, the remaining divisions of the Football League were renumbered upwards.)	42	18	9	15	63	55	63	7th (Note: Bury lost 1–0 on aggregate to York City in the play-off semi-final.)	R3	R3	Football League Trophy	R1(N)	Not known	—
1993–94	Div 3	42	14	11	17	55	56	53	13th	R1	R1	Football League Trophy	R2(N)	Mark Carter	20
1994–95	Div 3	42	23	11	8	73	36	80	4th (Note: After beating Preston North End 2–0 on aggregate in the play-off semi-final, Bury lost 2–0 to Chesterfield in the final.)	R3	R1	Football League Trophy	SF(N)	David Pugh	17
1995–96	Div 3 ↑	46	22	13	11	66	48	79	3rd	R1	R3	Football League Trophy	R1(N)	Mark Carter	16
1996–97	Div 2 ↑	46	24	12	10	62	38	84	1st	R1	R2	Football League Trophy	QF(N)	Mark Carter	12
1997–98	Div 1	46	11	19	16	42	58	52	17th	R3	R2	Football League Trophy	R1(N)	Tony Battersby; Tony Ellis; Peter Swan	6
1998–99	Div 1 ↓	46	10	17	19	35	60	47	22nd	R3	R3	Football League Trophy	SF(N)	Laurent D'Jaffo	8
1999–2000	Div 2	46	13	18	15	61	64	57	15th	R2	R1	Football League Trophy	R1(N)	Andy Preece	12
2000–01	Div 2	46	16	10	20	45	59	58	16th	R1	R1	Football League Trophy	QF(N)	Colin Cramb; Jon Newby	5
2001–02	Div 2 ↓	46	11	11	24	43	75	44	22nd	R1	R1	Football League Trophy	R2(N)	Gareth Seddon	7
2002–03	Div 3	46	18	16	12	57	56	70	7th (Note: Bury lost 3–1 on aggregate to AFC Bournemouth in the play-off semi-final.)	R1	R3	Football League Trophy	SF(N)	Jon Newby	10
2003–04	Div 3	46	15	11	20	54	64	56	12th	R1	R1	Football League Trophy	QF(N)	Gareth Seddon	11
2004–05	League 2 (Note: From the 2004–05 season, the Football League divisions were rebranded: Division One was renamed the Football League Championship, and Divisions Two and Three became Football League One and Football League Two respectively.)	46	14	16	16	54	54	58	17th	R2	R1	Football League Trophy	R1(N)	David Nugent	11
2005–06	League 2	46	12	17	17	45	57	52 (Note: One point deducted after the season ended for fielding an ineligible player; the deduction did not affect Bury's finishing position.)	19th	R1	R1	Football League Trophy	R1(N)	Simon Whaley	7
2006–07	League 2	46	13	11	22	46	61	50	21st	DQ (Note: After beating Chester City in a second-round replay, Bury were disqualified from the 2006–07 FA Cup for fielding an ineligible player.)	R2	Football League Trophy	R1(N)	Andy Bishop	15
2007–08	League 2	46	16	11	19	58	61	59	13th	R4	R1	Football League Trophy	SF(N)	Andy Bishop	19
2008–09	League 2	46	21	15	10	63	43	78	4th (Note: Bury lost to Shrewsbury Town on penalties in the play-off semi-final.)	R1	R1	Football League Trophy	QF(N)	Andy Bishop	16
2009–10	League 2	46	19	12	15	54	59	69	9th	R1	R1	Football League Trophy	QF(N)	Ryan Lowe	18
2010–11	League 2 ↑	46	23	12	11	82	50	81	2nd	R2	R1	Football League Trophy	QF(N)	Ryan Lowe	27
2011–12	League 1	46	15	11	20	60	79	56	14th	R1	R2	Football League Trophy	R1(N)	Andy Bishop	8
2012–13	League 1 ↓	46	9	14	23	45	73	41	22nd	R2	R1	Football League Trophy	QF(N)	Steven Schumacher	8
2013–14	League 2	46	13	20	13	59	51	59	12th	R1	R2	Football League Trophy	R1(N)	Daniel Nardiello	11
2014–15	League 2 ↑	46	26	7	13	60	40	85	3rd	R2	R1	Football League Trophy	QF(N)	Daniel Nardiello; Danny Rose	10
2015–16	League 1	46	16	12	18	56	73	57 (Note: Three points deducted after the season ended for fielding an unregistered player; the deduction dropped Bury from 14th to 16th place.)	16th	R4	R2	Football League Trophy	R2(N)	Leon Clarke	15
2016–17	League 1	46	13	11	22	61	73	50	19th	R1	R1	EFL Trophy	Group	James Vaughan	24
2017–18	League 1 ↓	46	8	12	26	41	71	36	24th	R1	R1	EFL Trophy	R3(N)	Jermaine Beckford; George Miller	8
2018–19	League 2 ↑	46	22	13	11	82	56	79	2nd	R2	R1	EFL Trophy	SF	Nicky Maynard	21
2019–20	League 1 †	—	—	—	—	—	—	—	Exp (Note: With the club having faced winding-up petitions, up for sale, and due to begin the 2019–20 EFL League One season with a 12-point deduction, the EFL wanted evidence for Bury's viability. Matches were systematically postponed, and the team were thrown out of the EFL Cup, until failure to meet a deadline meant the club was expelled from the League. They were consequently removed from Northern Group C of the EFL Trophy, and from the draw for the first round of the FA Cup, which resulted in Chichester City, the lowest-ranked team remaining in the competition, receiving a bye to the second round.)	Exp	Exp	EFL Trophy	Exp	—	—
2020–21 (Note: Season played by Bury AFC. When that club merged with Bury FC in 2023, the teams' histories were combined.)	NWC D1N	7	5	1	1	22	11	16	1st (Note: Because of COVID-19 pandemic-related issues, the 2020–21 NWCFL season did not start until October 2020, and disruption continued. A few matches were played in December, before all football below National League level was curtailed in February 2021.)	—	—	FA Vase	QR1	Tom Greaves	14
2021–22	NWC D1N ↑	36	27	8	1	92	32	89	1st	—	—	FA Vase; Manchester Premier Cup; NWCFL Challenge Cup; NWCFL Div.1 Cup	R3; QF; R3; R1	Tom Greaves	14
2022–23	NWC P	42	25	8	9	74	42	83	4th	QR4	—	FA Vase; Manchester Premier Cup; NWCFL Challenge Cup	QF; R1; R2	Lewis Gilboy	16
2023–24	NWC P	46	29	8	9	108	50	92 (Note: Bury were deducted 3 points for fielding an ineligible player on 29 July 2023.)	3rd (Note: After beating Charnock Richard 1–0 in the play-off semi-final, Bury drew 1–1 to Wythenshawe Town and lost 3–2 on penalties in the final.)	PR	—	FA Vase; Manchester Premier Cup; NWCFL Challenge Cup	R2; R1; R3	Andrew Briggs	24
2024–25	NWC P ↑	46	33	10	3	131	49	109	1st	QR4	—	FA Vase; Manchester Premier Cup; NWCFL Challenge Cup	R1; R1; R2	Djavan Pedro	24
2025–26	NPL D1W P ↑	42	27	9	6	86	36	90	1st	PR Replay	—	FA Trophy; Manchester Premier Cup	2RQ; R1	Kai Evans	16
