= 1999–2000 Bury F.C. season =

Bury
1999–2000 season
- Chairman: Terry Robinson
- Manager: Neil Warnock (until 2 December); Steve Redmond/Andy Preece (caretakers from 2 December)
- Stadium: Gigg Lane
- Second Division: 15th
- FA Cup: Second round
- League Cup: First round
- Football League Trophy: First round
- Top goalscorer: League: Preece (12); All: Preece/Lawson (12)
- Average home league attendance: 4,024

During the 1999–2000 English football season, Bury F.C. competed in the Football League Second Division.

== Season summary ==
In the 1999-2000 season, Bury had a disappointing campaign after relegation from the second tier of English football the previous season which at one stage saw manager Warnock resigning from his role on 2 December to take over as Sheffield United manager. Andy Preece and Steve Redmond took temporary charge until the end of the season and Bury finished the season in 15th place.

== Final league table ==
Pos	Team	Pld	W	D	L	GF	GA	GD	Pts
13	Luton Town	46	17	10	19	61	65	−4	61
14	Oldham Athletic	46	16	12	18	50	55	−5	60
15	Bury	46	13	18	15	61	64	−3	57
16	Bournemouth	46	16	9	21	59	62	−3	57
17	Brentford	46	13	13	20	47	61	−14	52

Rules for classification: 1) Points; 2) Goal difference; 3) Goals scored

== Results ==
Bury's score comes first

=== Legend ===
Win	Draw	Loss

=== Football League Second Division ===
Date	Opponent	Venue	Result	Attendance	Scorers
7 August 1999	Gillingham	H	2–1	4,014	Lawson, Littlejohn
14 August 1999	Wrexham	A	0–1	4,185	
21 August 1999	Brentford	H	2–2	3,491	Lawson, C Swailes
28 August 1999	Bristol City	A	1–1	9,537	Littlejohn
30 August 1999	Colchester United	H	5–2	3,360	Lawson (3), Littlejohn, Preece
4 September 1999	Luton Town	A	1–1	4,633	Richardson
11 September 1999	Oldham Athletic	A	0–2	6,541	
18 September 1999	Wycombe Wanderers	H	2–0	3,293	Preece, Bullock
25 September 1999	Bournemouth	A	1–1	4,208	Lawson
2 October 1999	Cardiff City	H	3–2	3,603	Lawson, Bullock, Preece
9 October 1999	Notts County	H	1–3	3,620	Billy
16 October 1999	Blackpool	A	5–0	5,270	C Swailes, Hills (own goal), Billy, Lawson, Barnes
20 October 1999	Reading	A	0–2	5,393	
23 October 1999	Bournemouth	H	2–2	3,701	Preece (pen), Littlejohn
2 November 1999	Bristol Rovers	A	0–0	5,397	
6 November 1999	Stoke City	H	0–0	4,280	
13 November 1999	Oxford United	A	1–1	4,318	Lawson
23 November 1999	Wigan Athletic	H	2–2	4,086	Billy, Preece (pen)
27 November 1999	Preston North End	H	1–3	6,469	Lawson
4 December 1999	Gillingham	A	0–1	7,036	
18 December 1999	Scunthorpe United	A	2–0	3,137	Logan (own goal), Barnes
26 December 1999	Burnley	H	4–2	9,115	Preece (2, 1 pen), Barrass, Littlejohn
4 January 2000	Millwall	H	2–2	3,375	Reid, Redmond
15 January 2000	Wrexham	H	0–2	3,622	
22 January 2000	Brentford	A	1–2	5,605	Lawson
29 January 2000	Bristol City	H	0–0	3,435	
5 February 2000	Colchester United	A	3–1	3,915	D Swailes, James, Barnes
12 February 2000	Luton Town	H	1–0	3,760	Littlejohn
19 February 2000	Preston North End	A	1–1	13,901	James
22 February 2000	Cambridge United	H	0–2	3,088	
26 February 2000	Wycombe Wanderers	A	0–3	4,909	
4 March 2000	Oldham Athletic	H	2–2	5,306	Reid (pen), Preece
11 March 2000	Bristol Rovers	H	0–0	4,049	
18 March 2000	Wigan Athletic	A	0–1	6,567	
21 March 2000	Oxford United	H	1–2	2,606	Daws
25 March 2000	Burnley	A	2–2	13,297	D Swailes, Daws
28 March 2000	Chesterfield	A	1–0	1,903	D Swailes
1 April 2000	Scunthorpe United	H	3–0	3,546	Crowe, Preece (pen), Barnes
4 April 2000	Cambridge United	A	0–3	3,016	
8 April 2000	Millwall	A	0–3	10,742	
15 April 2000	Chesterfield	H	1–1	3,021	Bhutia
22 April 2000	Blackpool	H	3–2	3,857	Preece (2, 1 pen), Littlejohn
24 April 2000	Cardiff City	A	2–0	6,781	Littlejohn (2)
29 April 2000	Reading	H	1–1	3,869	Preece
3 May 2000	Stoke City	A	0–3	14,792	
6 May 2000	Notts County	A	2–2	4,017	Bhutia, Billy

=== FA Cup ===
Round	Date	Opponent	Venue	Result	Attendance	Goalscorers
R1	30 October 1999	Tamworth	A	2–2	2,743	Bullock, Littlejohn
R1R	10 November 1999	Tamworth	H	2–1 (a.e.t.)	2,531	Billy, James
R2	20 November 1999	Cardiff City	H	0–0	2,603	
R2R	30 November 1999	Cardiff City	A	0–1 (a.e.t.)	4,511	

=== League Cup ===
Round	Date	Opponent	Venue	Result	Attendance	Goalscorers
R1 1st Leg	10 August 1999	Notts County	H	1–0	1,893	Lawson
R1 2nd Leg	24 August 1999	Notts County	A	0–2 (lost 1-2 agg)	2,494	

=== Football League Trophy ===
Round	Date	Opponent	Venue	Result	Attendance	Goalscorers
NR1	7 December 1999	Mansfield Town	A	1–2 (a.e.t.)	1,205	Bullock

== Squad ==
Note: Flags indicate national team as defined under FIFA eligibility rules; some limited exceptions apply. Players may hold more than one non-FIFA nationality.

No.	Pos.	Nation	Player
1	GK	(England) ENG	Mark Cartwright (on loan from Wrexham)
3	DF	(England) ENG	Paul Williams
4	MF	(England) ENG	Nick Daws
5	DF	(England) ENG	Sam Collins
6	DF	(England) ENG	Chris Swailes
7	MF	(England) ENG	Chris Billy
8	MF	(England) ENG	Darren Bullock
9	FW	(England) ENG	Paul Barnes
10	FW	(India) IND	Baichung Bhutia
11	MF	(England) ENG	Paul Reid
12	MF	(Sweden) SWE	Kemajl Avdiu
13	GK	(England) ENG	Paddy Kenny
14	DF	(England) ENG	Marvin Bryan
15	DF	(England) ENG	Brian Linighan
16	FW	(Saint Kitts and Nevis) SKN	Lutel James
17	DF	(England) ENG	Steve Redmond
18	FW	(England) ENG	Andy Preece

No.	Pos.	Nation	Player
19	MF	(England) ENG	Martyn Forrest
20	FW	(England) ENG	Dean Crowe (on loan from Stoke City)
21	MF	(England) ENG	Adrian Littlejohn
22	MF	(England) ENG	Ryan Souter
23	DF	(England) ENG	Dean Barrick
24	DF	(England) ENG	Danny Swailes
25	DF	(England) ENG	Paul Challinor
26	DF	(England) ENG	Nicky Hill
29	DF	(England) ENG	Matt Barrass
30	FW	(England) ENG	Lee Buggie
31	DF	(England) ENG	Lee Connell
32	MF	(England) ENG	John Gaynor
34	GK	(England) ENG	Gary Hoggeth
35	MF	(England) ENG	Steve Halford
36	MF	(England) ENG	Phil Beal
37	DF	(England) ENG	Chris Armstrong

=== Left club during season ===
Note: Flags indicate national team as defined under FIFA eligibility rules; some limited exceptions apply. Players may hold more than one non-FIFA nationality.

No.	Pos.	Nation	Player
10	FW	(Benin) BEN	Laurent D'Jaffo (to Stockport County)
27	MF	(England) ENG	Lee Richardson (on loan from Huddersfield Town)
26	FW	(Portugal) POR	Carlos Rocha (to Lincoln City)
33	DF	(England) ENG	Mark Donnelly (Released)
20	FW	(England) ENG	Ian Lawson (to Stockport County)

No.	Pos.	Nation	Player
28	FW	(England) ENG	Gary Messer (to Workington)
2	DF	(England) ENG	Andy Woodward (to Sheffield United)
31	MF	(England) ENG	John Borg (Released)
32	DF	(England) ENG	Rob Debenham (Released)
