= 1998–99 Bury F.C. season =

Bury
1998–99 season
- Chairman: Terry Robinson
- Manager: Neil Warnock
- Stadium: Gigg Lane
- First Division: 22nd (relegated)
- FA Cup: Third round
- League Cup: Third round
- Top goalscorer: League: Laurent D'Jaffo (8); All: Laurent D'Jaffo (9)
- Highest home attendance: 8,669 (vs. Sunderland, 13 April)
- Lowest home attendance: 2,780 (vs. Crystal Palace, 15 September)
- Average home league attendance: 5,476

During the 1998–99 English football season, Bury F.C. competed in the Football League First Division.

== Season summary ==
After Stan Ternent moved to Burnley in the summer of 1998, Bury appointed Neil Warnock as manager, but with sales of players such as Paul Butler to Sunderland and a cash crisis at the club, Bury suffered relegation from Division One in May 1999, but only on goals scored. This was the only season where goals scored took precedence over goal difference. If it were not for this rule, Bury would have survived at the expense of Port Vale.

== Final league table ==
Pos	Team	Pld	W	D	L	GF	GA	GD	Pts	Qualification or relegation
20	Queens Park Rangers	46	12	11	23	52	61	−9	47	
21	Port Vale	46	13	8	25	45	75	−30	47	
22	Bury (R)	46	10	17	19	35	60	−25	47	Relegation to the Second Division
23	Oxford United (R)	46	10	14	22	48	71	−23	44	Relegation to the Second Division
24	Bristol City (R)	46	9	15	22	57	80	−23	42	Relegation to the Second Division

Rules for classification: 1) Points; 2) Goals scored; 3) Goal difference
(R) Relegated

== Results ==
Bury's score comes first

=== Legend ===
Win	Draw	Loss

=== Football League First Division ===
Date	Opponent	Venue	Result	Attendance	Scorers
8 August 1998	Huddersfield Town	H	1–0	7,659	Ellis
15 August 1998	Ipswich Town	A	0–0	13,267	
22 August 1998	Crewe Alexandra	H	1–0	5,073	D'Jaffo
29 August 1998	Queens Park Rangers	A	0–0	8,612	
31 August 1998	Swindon Town	H	3–0	4,513	Barrick, Matthews, Preece
5 September 1998	Birmingham City	A	0–1	15,935	
8 September 1998	Portsmouth	H	2–1	4,310	Preece, D'Jaffo
13 September 1998	Norwich City	A	0–0	16,919	
19 September 1998	Tranmere Rovers	H	0–0	5,030	
26 September 1998	Wolverhampton Wanderers	A	0–1	20,155	
30 September 1998	Crystal Palace	A	2–4	13,219	Daws, Preece
3 October 1998	Bristol City	H	0–1	4,794	
9 October 1998	Bradford City	A	0–3	15,697	
17 October 1998	Stockport County	H	1–1	5,732	Matthews
20 October 1998	Oxford United	H	1–0	3,436	Swailes
24 October 1998	Sunderland	A	0–1	38,049	
31 October 1998	Watford	H	1–3	4,342	Ellis
7 November 1998	Barnsley	A	1–1	15,115	D'Jaffo
14 November 1998	Sheffield United	A	1–3	14,164	James
21 November 1998	Grimsby Town	H	1–0	4,198	Lucketti
28 November 1998	Bolton Wanderers	A	0–4	21,028	
5 December 1998	West Bromwich Albion	H	2–0	5,007	Johnrose, D'Jaffo (pen)
11 December 1998	Sheffield United	H	3–3	5,002	D'Jaffo, Williams, Swailes
19 December 1998	Port Vale	A	0–1	6,425	
26 December 1998	Crewe Alexandra	A	1–3	5,333	Woodward
28 December 1998	Birmingham City	H	2–4	7,024	D'Jaffo (2, 1 pen)
9 January 1999	Huddersfield Town	A	2–2	10,788	West, Johnrose
16 January 1999	Queens Park Rangers	H	1–1	4,609	James
30 January 1999	Swindon Town	A	1–1	7,797	Littlejohn
6 February 1999	Ipswich Town	H	0–3	4,750	
13 February 1999	Portsmouth	A	1–2	9,062	Avdiu
20 February 1999	Norwich City	H	0–2	4,285	
27 February 1999	Tranmere Rovers	A	0–4	6,002	
6 March 1999	Crystal Palace	H	0–0	4,334	
9 March 1999	Bristol City	A	1–1	11,606	D'Jaffo
13 March 1999	Barnsley	H	0–0	4,696	
16 March 1999	Wolverhampton Wanderers	H	0–0	5,204	
20 March 1999	Watford	A	0–0	9,336	
3 April 1999	Stockport County	A	0–0	7,483	
5 April 1999	Bradford City	H	0–2	8,000	
10 April 1999	Oxford United	A	1–0	6,358	Lilley
13 April 1999	Sunderland	H	2–5	8,669	Bullock, Daws
17 April 1999	Grimsby Town	A	0–0	5,132	
23 April 1999	Bolton Wanderers	H	2–1	7,680	West, Swailes
1 May 1999	West Bromwich Albion	A	0–1	12,918	
9 May 1999	Port Vale	H	1–0	7,567	West

=== FA Cup ===
Round	Date	Opponent	Venue	Result	Attendance	Goalscorers
R3	2 January 1999	Stockport County	H	0–3	5,325	

=== League Cup ===
Round	Date	Opponent	Venue	Result	Attendance	Goalscorers
R1 1st Leg	11 August 1998	Burnley	H	1–1	3,927	Matthews
R1 2nd Leg	18 August 1998	Burnley	A	4–1 (won 5–2 on agg)	5,453	D'Jaffo, Daws, Armstrong, Matthews
R2 1st Leg	15 September 1998	Crystal Palace	H	3–0	2,780	Johnrose (2), Matthews
R2 2nd Leg	23 September 1998	Crystal Palace	A	1–2 (won 4–2 on agg)	3,546	Morrison (own goal)
R3	28 October 1998	Manchester United	A	0–2	52,495	

== First-team squad ==
Squad at end of season

Note: Flags indicate national team as defined under FIFA eligibility rules; some limited exceptions apply. Players may hold more than one non-FIFA nationality.

No.	Pos.	Nation	Player
—	GK	(England) ENG	Paddy Kenny
—	GK	(Republic of Ireland) IRL	Dean Kiely
—	GK	(Zimbabwe) ZIM	Bruce Grobbelaar
—	DF	(England) ENG	Gordon Armstrong
—	DF	(England) ENG	Dean Barrick
—	DF	(England) ENG	John Foster
—	DF	(England) ENG	Brian Linighan
—	DF	(England) ENG	Chris Lucketti (captain)
—	DF	(England) ENG	Steve Redmond
—	DF	(England) ENG	Carl Serrant (on loan from Newcastle United)
—	DF	(England) ENG	Danny Swailes
—	DF	(England) ENG	Chris Swailes
—	DF	(England) ENG	Dean West
—	DF	(England) ENG	Paul Williams
—	DF	(England) ENG	Andy Woodward
—	MF	(England) ENG	Chris Billy
—	MF	(England) ENG	Darren Bullock
—	MF	(England) ENG	Nick Daws

No.	Pos.	Nation	Player
—	MF	(England) ENG	Martyn Forrest
—	MF	(England) ENG	Lenny Johnrose
—	MF	(England) ENG	Mark Patterson
—	MF	(England) ENG	Andy Preece
—	MF	(England) ENG	John Reed
—	MF	(England) ENG	Tony Rigby
—	DF	(England) ENG	Ryan Souter
—	MF	(Sweden) SWE	Kemajl Avdiu
—	FW	(England) ENG	Paul Barnes
—	FW	(England) ENG	Tony Ellis
—	FW	(England) ENG	Nigel Jemson
—	FW	(England) ENG	Adrian Littlejohn
—	FW	(England) ENG	Rob Matthews
—	FW	(Scotland) SCO	Derek Lilley (on loan from Leeds United)
—	FW	(Benin) BEN	Laurent D'Jaffo
—	FW	(Jamaica) JAM	Paul Hall
—	FW	(Saint Kitts and Nevis) SKN	Lutel James

=== Left club during season ===
Note: Flags indicate national team as defined under FIFA eligibility rules; some limited exceptions apply. Players may hold more than one non-FIFA nationality.

No.	Pos.	Nation	Player
—	MF	(England) ENG	Simon Baldry (on loan from Huddersfield Town)
