= 1996–97 Bury F.C. season =

Bury
1996–97 season
- Chairman: Terry Robinson
- Manager: Stan Ternent
- Stadium: Gigg Lane
- Second Division: 1st (champions)
- FA Cup: First round
- League Cup: Second round
- Football League Trophy: Quarter finals
- Top goalscorer: League: Carter (12); All: Carter (13)
- Average home league attendance: 4,502

During the 1996–97 English football season, Bury F.C. competed in the Football League Second Division.

== Season summary ==
In the 1996–97 season, it was the one to remember for Bury supporters as they won the Second Division title and as a result were promoted to the second tier of English football for the first time since 1969.

== Final league table ==
Pos	Team	Pld	W	D	L	GF	GA	GD	Pts	Promotion or relegation
1	Bury (C, P)	46	24	12	10	62	38	+24	84	Promotion to the First Division
2	Stockport County (P)	46	23	13	10	59	41	+18	82	Promotion to the First Division
3	Luton Town	46	21	15	10	71	45	+26	78	Qualification for the Second Division play-offs
4	Brentford	46	20	14	12	56	43	+13	74	Qualification for the Second Division play-offs
5	Bristol City	46	21	10	15	69	51	+18	73	Qualification for the Second Division play-offs

Rules for classification: In the Football League goals scored (GF) takes precedence over goal difference (GD).
(C) Champions; (P) Promoted

== Results ==
Bury's score comes first

=== Legend ===
Win	Draw	Loss

=== Football League Second Division ===
Date	Opponent	Venue	Result	Attendance	Scorers
17 August 1996	Brentford	H	1–1	3,373	Jepson
24 August 1996	Chesterfield	A	2–1	3,763	West, Carter
27 August 1996	Wycombe Wanderers	A	1–0	3,563	Jepson
31 August 1996	Bristol City	H	4–0	4,160	Johnson, Carter, Jackson, Johnrose
7 September 1996	Rotherham United	H	3–1	3,523	Carter (2, 1 pen), Jackson
10 September 1996	Crewe Alexandra	A	0–2	3,627	
14 September 1996	Shrewsbury Town	A	1–1	3,238	Armstrong
21 September 1996	Luton Town	H	0–0	3,588	
28 September 1996	Walsall	A	1–3	3,254	Carter (pen)
1 October 1996	Burnley	H	1–0	7,557	Jepson
5 October 1996	Blackpool	H	1–0	5,317	Armstrong
12 October 1996	Peterborough United	A	2–1	6,003	Matthews, Johnson
16 October 1996	Millwall	A	0–1	6,447	
19 October 1996	Watford	H	1–1	4,092	Carter
26 October 1996	Bristol Rovers	H	2–1	4,082	Stant, O'Kane
29 October 1996	Wrexham	A	1–1	3,895	West
2 November 1996	Bournemouth	A	1–1	3,946	Carter
9 November 1996	York City	H	4–1	4,021	West (2), Pugh, O'Kane
23 November 1996	Plymouth Argyle	H	1–0	3,582	Carter
30 November 1996	Bristol Rovers	A	3–4	4,496	Pugh, Johnson, Carter (pen)
3 December 1996	Preston North End	H	3–0	5,447	Johnrose, Johnson, Carter
14 December 1996	Gillingham	A	2–2	5,542	Matthews, Randall
21 December 1996	Stockport County	H	0–0	5,069	
28 December 1996	Rotherham United	A	1–1	3,263	Matthews
17 January 1997	Burnley	A	1–3	10,526	Matthews
1 February 1997	York City	A	2–0	3,423	Jackson, Jepson
8 February 1997	Bournemouth	H	2–1	3,559	Carter (pen), Matthews
15 February 1997	Plymouth Argyle	A	0–2	5,486	
22 February 1997	Notts County	H	2–0	3,430	Randall, Jepson
25 February 1997	Wrexham	H	0–0	3,419	
1 March 1997	Preston North End	A	1–3	8,749	O'Kane
4 March 1997	Shrewsbury Town	H	2–0	2,690	Randall, Johnson
8 March 1997	Stockport County	A	1–2	8,170	Butler
15 March 1997	Gillingham	H	3–0	3,492	Johnrose, Battersby, Johnson
22 March 1997	Chesterfield	H	1–0	4,162	Johnson
25 March 1997	Notts County	A	1–0	3,306	Jepson
29 March 1997	Brentford	A	2–0	7,823	Daws, Carter (pen)
31 March 1997	Wycombe Wanderers	H	2–0	5,714	Daws, Butler
5 April 1997	Bristol City	A	0–1	10,274	
8 April 1997	Walsall	H	2–1	4,082	Jepson, Battersby
12 April 1997	Blackpool	A	0–2	6,812	
15 April 1997	Crewe Alexandra	H	1–0	4,725	Jepson
19 April 1997	Peterborough United	H	1–0	4,631	Johnson
22 April 1997	Luton Town	A	0–0	7,769	
26 April 1997	Watford	A	0–0	9,017	
3 May 1997	Millwall	H	2–0	9,785	Jepson, Johnrose

=== FA Cup ===
Round	Date	Opponent	Venue	Result	Attendance	Goalscorers
R1	16 November 1996	Chesterfield	A	0–1	5,104	

=== League Cup ===
Round	Date	Opponent	Venue	Result	Attendance	Goalscorers
R1 1st Leg	20 August 1996	Notts County	A	1–1	2,141	Pugh
R1 2nd Leg	3 September 1996	Notts County	H	1–0 (won 2–1 on agg)	2,571	Carter
R2 1st Leg	17 September 1996	Crystal Palace	H	1–3	3,472	Jackson
R2 2nd Leg	24 September 1996	Crystal Palace	A	0–4 (lost 7–1 on agg)	5,195	

=== Football League Trophy ===
Round	Date	Opponent	Venue	Result	Attendance	Goalscorers
NR1	10 December 1996	Darlington	H	3–1	1,436	
NR2	13 January 1997	Mansfield Town	H	6–0	1,331	
NQF	11 February 1997	Stockport County	H	1–2 (a.e.t.)	2,497	

== Squad ==
Note: Flags indicate national team as defined under FIFA eligibility rules; some limited exceptions apply. Players may hold more than one non-FIFA nationality.

No.	Pos.	Nation	Player
—	GK	ENG	Lee Bracey
—	GK	ENG	Dean Kiely
—	DF	ENG	Lee Anderson
—	DF	ENG	Matt Barrass
—	DF	ENG	Stuart Bimson
—	DF	IRL	Paul Butler
—	DF	ENG	Michael Jackson
—	DF	ENG	Chris Lucketti
—	DF	ENG	Trevor Matthewson
—	DF	ENG	John O'Kane (on loan from Manchester United)
—	DF	ENG	Nicky Reid
—	DF	ENG	Barry Shuttleworth
—	DF	ENG	Dean West
—	DF	ENG	Andy Woodward
—	MF	ENG	Gordon Armstrong
—	MF	ENG	Nick Daws

No.	Pos.	Nation	Player
—	MF	WAL	Ian Hughes
—	MF	ENG	Lenny Johnrose
—	MF	NIR	Steve Jones
—	MF	ENG	Rob Matthews
—	MF	ENG	Adrian Randall
—	MF	ENG	Shaun Reid
—	MF	ENG	Tony Rigby
—	MF	ENG	Ian Thompstone
—	FW	ENG	Tony Battersby
—	FW	ENG	Mark Carter
—	FW	ENG	Ronnie Jepson
—	FW	JAM	David Johnson
—	FW	ENG	David Pugh
—	FW	ENG	Andy Scott (on loan from Sheffield United)
—	FW	ENG	Phil Stant
—	FW	ENG	Peter Thomson
