= 1997–98 Bury F.C. season =

Bury
1997–98 season
- Chairman: Terry Robinson
- Manager: Stan Ternent
- Stadium: Gigg Lane
- First Division: 17th
- FA Cup: Third round
- League Cup: Second round
- Top goalscorer: League: Battersby/Ellis/Swan (6); All: Johnson (8)
- Average home league attendance: 6,177

During the 1997–98 English football season, Bury F.C. competed in the Football League First Division.

== Season summary ==
In the 1997–98 season, newly promoted Bury were battling against relegation for most of the campaign and were destined to be heading straight back down by the beginning of February where they sat in the bottom three with only 4 wins from 30 games, but from then on Bury went on an amazing nine game unbeaten run and winning 7 in their final 16 league games to secure survival against the odds.

== Final league table ==
Pos	Team	Pld	W	D	L	GF	GA	GD	Pts
15	Norwich City	46	14	13	19	52	69	−17	55
16	Huddersfield Town	46	14	11	21	50	72	−22	53
17	Bury	46	11	19	16	42	58	−16	52
18	Swindon Town	46	14	10	22	42	73	−31	52
19	Port Vale	46	13	10	23	56	66	−10	49

Source: Statto.com
Rules for classification: 1) Points; 2) Goals scored; 3) Goal difference

== Results ==
Bury's score comes first

=== Legend ===
Win	Draw	Loss

=== Football League First Division ===
Date	Opponent	Venue	Result	Attendance	Scorers
9 August 1997	Reading	H	1–1	5,065	Armstrong
16 August 1997	Stockport County	A	0–0	7,260	
23 August 1997	Charlton Athletic	H	0–0	4,657	
30 August 1997	Wolverhampton Wanderers	A	2–4	21,141	Battersby, Johnson
2 September 1997	Crewe Alexandra	A	2–1	4,447	Johnson, Swan
7 September 1997	Tranmere Rovers	H	1–0	5,073	Swan
12 September 1997	Manchester City	H	1–1	11,216	Johnson
20 September 1997	Port Vale	A	1–1	6,781	Swan
27 September 1997	West Bromwich Albion	H	1–3	6,439	Lucketti
4 October 1997	Stoke City	A	2–3	11,760	Swan, Gray (pen)
11 October 1997	Swindon Town	A	1–3	7,640	Battersby
18 October 1997	Birmingham City	H	2–1	5,700	Johnson, Swan
21 October 1997	Queens Park Rangers	H	1–1	4,602	Battersby
25 October 1997	Ipswich Town	A	0–2	10,478	
1 November 1997	Norwich City	A	2–2	14,419	Battersby, Johnrose
4 November 1997	Nottingham Forest	H	2–0	6,137	Swan, Johnson
8 November 1997	Portsmouth	H	0–2	5,065	
15 November 1997	Oxford United	A	1–1	5,811	C Swailes
22 November 1997	Sunderland	H	1–1	7,790	Lucketti
29 November 1997	Huddersfield Town	A	0–2	11,929	
6 December 1997	Middlesbrough	H	0–1	8,016	
13 December 1997	Bradford City	A	0–1	15,812	
20 December 1997	Sheffield United	H	1–1	6,012	Johnrose
26 December 1997	Tranmere Rovers	A	0–0	9,146	
28 December 1997	Crewe Alexandra	H	1–1	5,661	Patterson
10 January 1998	Reading	A	1–1	7,499	Gray
18 January 1998	Stockport County	H	0–1	5,699	
27 January 1998	Wolverhampton Wanderers	H	1–3	6,134	Battersby
31 January 1998	Charlton Athletic	A	0–0	15,312	
7 February 1998	Port Vale	H	2–2	5,285	Battersby, Ellis
14 February 1998	Manchester City	A	1–0	28,885	Butler
17 February 1998	Stoke City	H	0–0	5,802	
21 February 1998	West Bromwich Albion	A	1–1	15,840	Ellis
25 February 1998	Birmingham City	A	3–1	20,021	Rigby, Patterson, Ellis
28 February 1998	Swindon Town	H	1–0	5,002	Daws
3 March 1998	Portsmouth	A	1–1	12,462	Johnrose
7 March 1998	Norwich City	H	1–0	5,154	Jemson (pen)
14 March 1998	Nottingham Forest	A	0–3	18,846	
21 March 1998	Oxford United	H	1–0	5,159	Ellis
28 March 1998	Sunderland	A	1–2	37,425	Small
4 April 1998	Huddersfield Town	H	2–2	8,042	Butler, Ellis
11 April 1998	Middlesbrough	A	0–4	30,218	
13 April 1998	Bradford City	H	2–0	6,570	Ellis, Daws
18 April 1998	Sheffield United	A	0–3	16,056	
25 April 1998	Ipswich Town	H	0–1	7,830	
3 May 1998	Queens Park Rangers	A	1–0	15,210	Armstrong

=== FA Cup ===
Round	Date	Opponent	Venue	Result	Attendance	Goalscorers
R3	3 January 1998	Sheffield United	A	1–1	14,009	Gray
R3R	13 January 1998	Sheffield United	H	1–2	4,920	Gray

=== League Cup ===
Round	Date	Opponent	Venue	Result	Attendance	Goalscorers
R1 First Leg	12 August 1997	Crewe Alexandra	A	3–2	2,618	Armstrong, Jepson (pen), Johnson
R1 Second Leg	26 August 1997	Crewe Alexandra	H	3–3 (won 6–5 on agg)	3,296	Gray, Johnson, Battersby (pen)
R2 First Leg	16 September 1997	Sunderland	A	1–2	18,775	Daws
R2 Second Leg	23 September 1997	Sunderland	H	1–2 (lost 2–4 on agg)	3,928	Johnson

== Squad ==
Note: Flags indicate national team as defined under FIFA eligibility rules; some limited exceptions apply. Players may hold more than one non-FIFA nationality.

No.	Pos.	Nation	Player
—	GK	(England) ENG	Dean Kiely
—	DF	(England) ENG	Andy Woodward
—	DF	(England) ENG	Chris Lucketti
—	DF	(Republic of Ireland) IRL	Paul Butler
—	DF	(England) ENG	Bryan Small (on loan from Bradford City)
—	MF	(England) ENG	Nick Daws
—	MF	(England) ENG	Lenny Johnrose
—	MF	(England) ENG	Gordon Armstrong
—	FW	(England) ENG	Tony Battersby
—	FW	(England) ENG	Peter Swan
—	FW	(England) ENG	Tony Ellis
—	MF	(England) ENG	Andy A Gray
—	MF	(England) ENG	Mark Patterson
—	FW	(Jamaica) JAM	David Johnson
—	DF	(Wales) WAL	Ian Hughes
—	DF	(England) ENG	Chris Swailes

No.	Pos.	Nation	Player
—	FW	(England) ENG	Nigel Jemson
—	MF	(England) ENG	Rob Matthews
—	MF	(England) ENG	Tony Rigby
—	FW	(England) ENG	Ronnie Jepson
—	FW	(Scotland) SCO	Andy D Gray (on loan from Leeds United)
—	DF	(England) ENG	Steve Morgan (on loan from Wigan Athletic)
—	DF	(England) ENG	Dean West
—	MF	(England) ENG	Jason Peake
—	MF	(England) ENG	Adrian Randall
—	FW	(Scotland) SCO	Paul Dalglish (on loan from Newcastle United)
—	FW	(England) ENG	David Pugh
—	DF	(England) ENG	Danny Swailes
—	DF	(England) ENG	Brian Linighan
—	DF	(England) ENG	Matt Barrass
—	MF	(England) ENG	Martyn Forrest
