= Paddy Kenny =

Ireland international footballer

Personal information
- Full name: Patrick Joseph Kenny
- Date of birth: 17 May 1978 (age 48)
- Place of birth: Halifax, England
- Height: 6 ft 1 in (1.85 m)
- Position: Goalkeeper

Team information
- Current team: Matlock Town (goalkeeping coach)

Youth career
- Ovenden West Riding

Senior career*
Years	Team	Apps	(Gls)
1997–1998	Bradford Park Avenue	43	(0)
1998–2002	Bury	133	(0)
1999	→ Whitby Town (loan)	12	(0)
2002	→ Sheffield United (loan)	12	(0)
2002–2010	Sheffield United	266	(0)
2010–2012	Queens Park Rangers	77	(0)
2012–2014	Leeds United	76	(0)
2014–2015	Bolton Wanderers	0	(0)
2014	→ Oldham Athletic (loan)	3	(0)
2015	Ipswich Town	0	(0)
2015	Bury	0	(0)
2016	Rotherham United	0	(0)
2016–2017	Northampton Town	0	(0)
2017–2018	Maltby Main	1	(0)
Total		623	(0)

International career
2004–2006	Republic of Ireland	7	(0)

Managerial career
- 2023: Goole (joint-manager)
- * Club domestic league appearances and goals

Patrick Joseph Kenny (born 17 May 1978) is a former professional footballer who played as a goalkeeper. He is currently goalkeeping coach at Matlock Town.

Born in Halifax, West Yorkshire, Kenny began his career with Bradford Park Avenue before turning professional in the summer of 1998 upon signing for Neil Warnock's Bury. He was reunited with Warnock in 2002 after he joined Sheffield United where he spent much of his career and enjoyed notable success; performing in League Cup and FA Cup semi-finals, two play-off finals, and then promotion to the Premier League in 2005–06.

Kenny would later sign for Warnock once again in 2010, joining Queens Park Rangers after his time at Sheffield United ended on a sour note when he spent much of his final season on the sidelines having failed a drugs test the previous summer. During his first season at QPR he would achieve his second promotion to the Premier League and his first Championship winners medal. He remained as first choice goalkeeper the next season as QPR beat relegation on the final day of the season, before he was reunited with Warnock for the fourth time when he signed for Leeds United in 2012. He stayed at Leeds for two years, before brief spells with Bolton Wanderers, Oldham Athletic (on loan), Ipswich Town, Bury, and Rotherham United.

== Club career ==
=== Early career ===
Kenny started his career at Ovenden West Riding in the West Riding County Amateur League. He joined Bradford Park Avenue in August 1997, playing semi-professionally whilst working as an engineer in the week. He was an ever-present in the Northern Premier League during the 1997–98 season, playing 55 games in league and cup.

He had trials at Birmingham City and Bradford City, before he was signed by Neil Warnock at Bury in September 1998 for a £10,000 fee following a recommendation from Avenue's manager Trevor Storton. With Dean Kiely in goal for the "Shakers", Kenny was loaned out to Whitby Town in the Northern Premier League to gain some first team experience in March 1999. Two months later Kiely was sold to Charlton Athletic, giving Kenny the chance to become Bury's regular goalkeeper.

He made his Division Two debut for Bury on 7 August 1999 in a 2–1 win over Gillingham at Gigg Lane. He went on to become an ever-present in both the 1999–2000 and 2000–01 campaigns. Andy Preece's Bury were relegated into Division Three at the end of the 2001–02 season.

=== Sheffield United ===
Kenny initially joined Neil Warnock's Sheffield United on loan as cover for injured keeper Simon Tracey. He made his debut for the "Blades" in a 2–1 defeat to Coventry City at Highfield Road on 10 August 2002, and subsequently went on to become first choice goalkeeper. After three months the loan deal was made permanent for a £45,000 fee. On 26 May 2003, he played at the Millennium Stadium in the Division One play-off final, as United lost 3–0 to Wolverhampton Wanderers. He was voted United's Player of the Season in 2002–03 after keeping goal as United reached the semi-finals of the FA Cup and League Cup, where they were beaten by Arsenal and Liverpool respectively.

"Paddy is one of the best signings I've ever made. I think he's one of the best goalkeepers in the game. I wouldn't swap him for David James, Chris Kirkland, Paul Robinson or David Seaman. The first thing I did was put him on a diet. He was eating burgers, pizzas and chips - and that was in the same day. Look at the shape of him. He's the sort of player people don't pay much attention to, but he's one of the first names on the team sheet because he's so reliable."

— Despite struggling with his weight throughout his career, Kenny's reliability made him a particular favourite of Neil Warnock.

He was injured for three months of the 2003–04 season, but upon his recovery he regained his first team place from loanee Paul Gerrard. Kenny featured 48 times in the 2004–05 season as United finished six points outside the play-off places. He played every minute of United's promotion campaign to the Premier League in 2005–06. In February 2006 Sheffield United faced promotion rivals Reading. With the scores level at 1-1 Reading were awarded a last minute penalty, however Kenny saved Dave Kitson's effort. In November 2006, despite being told by club manager Neil Warnock to keep a low profile, Kenny went for a night out in Halifax. He became involved in a drunken brawl outside a curry house with a former friend, who admitted to having an affair with Kenny's wife. The fight ended with Kenny having his eyebrow bitten off and requiring 12 stitches. The affair brought an end to his marriage. He continued to be a key member of the United team in their season in the top flight but was unable to help prevent the club from being relegated on the final day of the 2006–07 season. In a match against Blackburn Rovers in September 2006 Kenny saved a Lucas Neill penalty in a 0–0 draw. His opposite number Brad Friedel also saved two penalties in the same match.

Back in the Championship he maintained his position of being the club's number one keeper for the 2007–08 campaign. With the team struggling Kenny maintained fine form with the only low point coming in February; despite making several excellent saves, he mistakenly knocked the ball into his own net in extra time in an FA Cup fifth round replay against Middlesbrough, a goal which knocked Sheffield United out of the cup.

Kenny began to voice disquiet over his contract situation at the end of 2008, despite manager Kevin Blackwell insisting that the club were set to open talks on a new deal. Despite this Kenny was dropped for the Boxing Day game against Wolverhampton Wanderers after being late for training and he was placed on the transfer list a few days later. He returned to the first team after sitting out two league games and was again ever present until the end of the 2008–09 season, including an appearance at Wembley Stadium in the Championship play-off final. Although United missed out on promotion Kenny agreed a contract extension a few days later, effectively signalling his removal from the transfer list.

Only a few weeks after signing a contract extension it was reported that Kenny had failed a drug test after the previous season's play-off semi-final. Kenny tested positive for ephedrine, a banned substance, believed to have been contained in a cough medicine he bought over the counter. Following an FA hearing in September 2009, Kenny was banned from all professional football for nine months. He was not allowed to go to Bramall Lane, so had to train on his own away from his teammates and coaches. Despite an unsuccessful appeal against his ban, Sheffield United still opted to agree a new contract extension with Kenny during his enforced absence from first team football.

"The barrister was adamant I would get three months backdated and I would be able to come back at the start of the season. So when at the hearing they said 'we agree you've not taken it to enhance performance, but we are hitting you with a nine-month ban for negligence', it was a massive shock."

— Kenny had taken over-the-counter ChestEze medicine, which contained ephedrine hydrochloride, but still received a lengthy ban.

=== Queens Park Rangers ===
Despite having only recently signed an extended deal with Sheffield United, Kenny signed a three-year contract for former boss Neil Warnock's side Queens Park Rangers in June 2010. Although Sheffield United did not wish to part with him, QPR's bid of £750,000 met the release clause that had been inserted into his contract, allowing him to leave. The move meant his wages were doubled to £20,000-a-week. He was voted the club's Player of the Season for the 2010–11 season as the "R's" won promotion as champions of the Championship.

Kenny continued to remain Rangers number one keeper in their first season back in the Premier League, making 33 starts and keeping seven clean sheets. QPR retained their Premier League place on the final day of the 2011–12 season, despite Kenny conceding an injury time goal to Sergio Agüero to lose the title deciding game against Manchester City.

Despite Kenny's good form during the 2011–12 season, new manager Mark Hughes decided to sign England keeper Robert Green from West Ham United before the 2012–13 campaign began, effectively ensuring that Kenny would lose his place in the first team, and as such Kenny was subsequently made available for a transfer. Soon after Kenny's departure from the club, QPR wrote a formal letter of complaint to Leeds United over abusive texts allegedly sent by Kenny to their technical director Mike Rigg and chairman Tony Fernandes. The texts were reported to have mocked the club's poor first result of the season and, in particular, the performance of Green; Kenny subsequently had his Twitter account deleted.

=== Leeds United ===
Kenny signed for Leeds United on a three-year contract in July 2012, linking up with manager Neil Warnock for a fourth time in his career. Having been allocated the number one shirt for the 2012–13 season, Kenny made his competitive début for Leeds in the first game of the season against Shrewsbury Town in the League Cup. Playing regularly for his new side, Kenny made his 500th senior career appearance on 23 October against Charlton Athletic. The 2012–13 season ended with Kenny being United's only ever present in the Championship, playing every minute of each 46 league games.

On 22 February 2014, Kenny missed his first league game since signing for Leeds, due to an ongoing injury he picked up against Nottingham Forest earlier in the 2013–14 season. Leeds signed Jack Butland on loan who went straight into the first team and made his debut in a 0–0 draw with Middlesbrough, where he received the man of the match award. Kenny wasn't named in a matchday squad after the signing of Jack Butland, with goalkeeper Alex Cairns favoured ahead of Kenny as the club's second choice goalkeeper. On 25 April, Kenny's agents brought out a statement confirming that Kenny was fit and available for selection despite his absence from the matchday squads. On 30 June 2014, Kenny was left out of Leeds' two week pre-season training camp to Santa Cristina in Italy. On 3 July, the Professional Footballers' Association investigated alleged media reports that Kenny had been dropped due to his birthdate falling on the 17th of a month, with owner Massimo Cellino having a deep superstition of the number 17. However, Kenny's agent Paul Masterton, laughed off the claims that Kenny had been dropped due to his birthdate falling on the 17th of a month. On the same day, Leeds signed goalkeeper Stuart Taylor increasing speculation about Kenny's long-term future at the club.

On 1 August 2014, Kenny wasn't assigned a Leeds squad number for the 2014–15 season, with new signing Marco Silvestri taking over Kenny's previous 1 squad number. On 18 August, Kenny left Leeds by mutual consent.

=== Later career ===
Kenny signed for Bolton Wanderers on a short-term deal on 19 September 2014 to provide competition for Andy Lonergan after Ádám Bogdán was ruled out with injury. After just two months at the Macron Stadium operating solely as an unused substitute, Kenny was loaned out to Oldham Athletic after manager Lee Johnson lost faith in Paul Rachubka. He played four matches in all competitions for Oldham – his last game for the club was a 7–0 defeat by Milton Keynes Dons, in what turned out to be his final appearance in professional football. On 19 January 2015, Bolton confirmed that Kenny had left the club at the expiration of his contract.

On 20 January 2015, Kenny joined Ipswich Town on a short-term deal. He did not feature in the 2014–15 season as Bartosz Białkowski held on to his first team place.

In August 2015 he began training with Port Vale, managed by former teammate Rob Page; though nominally only at Vale Park to maintain his fitness he was also considered for a short-term contract as first choice goalkeeper Chris Neal was out injured. On 6 November 2015, Kenny joined Bury on a short-term contract. He cancelled his contract after 13 days due to a calf injury, saying he did not wish to take money off the club if he was unable to play.

In February 2016, Kenny was signed by Neil Warnock at Rotherham United on a deal until the end of the 2015–16 season; it was the fifth time that Warnock has signed the goalkeeper.

After leaving Rotherham, Kenny reunited with former teammate Rob Page in the summer of 2016 as player-goalkeeping coach at Northampton Town.

In January 2017, Kenny left Sixfields due to new manager Justin Edinburgh appointing David Kerslake as his new assistant manager.

=== Maltby Main ===
In August 2017, Kenny joined Maltby Main of the Northern Counties East Football League. He made his league debut on 12 August in a 1–0 loss at Worksop Town; he started the match, but had to be substituted due to injury in the eleventh minute. He made one further appearance for the Miners in the FA Vase, starting against Ashton Athletic before again being substituted.

== International career ==
Although born in England, Kenny qualified to play for the Republic of Ireland as both his parents are Irish. He was called up by manager Brian Kerr and made his debut in 2004 as late substitute in a 2–1 win against the Czech Republic, before going on to make his first start in a 1–0 friendly victory over Jamaica. Kenny won seven caps before deciding to retire from international football in 2007, asking then manager Steve Staunton not to consider him for selection to allow him to sort out personal issues. Despite declaring himself ready to play for Ireland again multiple times from 2008 onwards he was never called up again.

== Coaching career ==
In October 2023, Kenny was appointed joint-manager of Northern Counties East League Premier Division club Goole alongside Nathan Helliwell. He stepped down one month later, citing family and work commitments.

In January 2026, Kenny was appointed goalkeeping coach at Northern Premier League Division One East club Matlock Town.

== Career statistics ==
=== Club ===
Appearances and goals by club, season and competition
Club	Season	League			FA Cup		League Cup		Other		Total	
Club	Season	Division	Apps	Goals	Apps	Goals	Apps	Goals	Apps	Goals	Apps	Goals
Bradford Park Avenue	1997–98	NPL Division One	42	0	1	0	—		12 (Note: Two appearances in FA Trophy, two appearances in West Riding County Cup, two appearances in Northern Premier League Challenge Cup, one appearance in Northern Premier League President's Cup, five appearances in Northern Premier League First Division Cup)	0	55	0
Bradford Park Avenue	1998–99	NPL Division One	1	0	0	0	—		—		1	0
Bradford Park Avenue	Total		43	0	1	0	—		12	0	56	0
Bury	1998–99	Division One	0	0	0	0	1	0	—		1	0
Bury	1999–2000	Division Two	46	0	4	0	2	0	1 (Note: Appearances in Football League Trophy)	0	53	0
Bury	2000–01	Division Two	46	0	2	0	2	0	3	0	53	0
Bury	2001–02	Division Two	41	0	1	0	1	0	1	0	44	0
Bury	Total		133	0	7	0	6	0	5	0	151	0
Whitby Town (loan)	1998–99	NPL Premier Division	12	0	0	0	—		1 (Note: Appearance in North Riding Senior Cup)	0	13	0
Sheffield United (loan)	2002–03	Division One	12	0	0	0	2	0	—		14	0
Sheffield United	2002–03	Division One	33	0	4	0	5	0	3 (Note: Appearances in Division One play-offs)	0	45	0
Sheffield United	2003–04	Division One	27	0	4	0	1	0	—		32	0
Sheffield United	2004–05	Championship	40	0	5	0	3	0	—		48	0
Sheffield United	2005–06	Championship	46	0	0	0	0	0	—		46	0
Sheffield United	2006–07	Premier League	34	0	0	0	0	0	—		34	0
Sheffield United	2007–08	Championship	40	0	4	0	3	0	—		47	0
Sheffield United	2008–09	Championship	44	0	2	0	1	0	3 (Note: Appearances in Championship play-offs)	0	50	0
Sheffield United	2009–10	Championship	2	0	0	0	0	0	—		2	0
Sheffield United	Total		278	0	19	0	15	0	6	0	318	0
Queens Park Rangers	2010–11	Championship	44	0	1	0	1	0	—		46	0
Queens Park Rangers	2011–12	Premier League	33	0	2	0	0	0	—		35	0
Queens Park Rangers	Total		77	0	3	0	1	0	—		81	0
Leeds United	2012–13	Championship	46	0	0	0	1	0	—		47	0
Leeds United	2013–14	Championship	30	0	1	0	3	0	—		34	0
Leeds United	Total		76	0	1	0	4	0	—		81	0
Bolton Wanderers	2014–15	Championship	0	0	0	0	0	0	—		0	0
Oldham Athletic (loan)	2014–15	League One	3	0	1	0	0	0	0	0	4	0
Ipswich Town	2014–15	Championship	0	0	0	0	0	0	0	0	0	0
Bury	2015–16	League One	0	0	0	0	0	0	0	0	0	0
Rotherham United	2015–16	Championship	0	0	0	0	0	0	—		0	0
Northampton Town	2016–17	League One	0	0	0	0	0	0	0	0	0	0
Maltby Main	2017–18	NCEFL Premier Division	1	0	0	0	—		1 (Note: Appearance in FA Vase)	0	2	0
Career total			623	0	32	0	26	0	25	0	706	0

=== International ===
Appearances and goals by national team and year
National team	Year	Apps	Goals
Republic of Ireland	2004	4	0
Republic of Ireland	2005	1	0
Republic of Ireland	2006	2	0
Total		7	0

== Honours ==
Sheffield United

- Football League Championship second-place promotion: 2005–06

Queens Park Rangers

- Football League Championship: 2010–11

Individual

- Bury Player of the Year: 1999–2000
- Sheffield United Player of the Year: 2002–03
- Queens Park Rangers Player of the Year: 2010–11
- Football League Championship Golden Glove: 2008–09
- PFA Team of the Year: 2010–11 Championship

== See also ==
- List of Republic of Ireland international footballers born outside the Republic of Ireland
