= Willie Cameron =

Scottish footballer and manager

Personal information
- Full name: William Smith Cameron
- Date of birth: 2 December 1883
- Place of birth: Mossend, Scotland
- Date of death: 14 October 1958 (aged 74)
- Place of death: Bolton, England
- Height: 5 ft 8 in (1.73 m)
- Position: Inside forward

Senior career*
Years	Team	Apps	(Gls)
- Kirkwood Thistle
1902–1903	Burnbank Athletic		
1903–1904	Albion Rovers	18	(3)
1904	Renton		
1904–1906	Glossop	41	(23)
1906–1908	Bolton Wanderers	26	(5)
1908–1913	Blackburn Rovers	69	(18)
1913–1914	Bury	38	(17)
1914–1919	Hull City	47	(10)
1915	→ Clydebank (loan)		
1916	→ Hamilton Academical (loan)	6	(4)
1916–1917	→ Vale of Leven (loan)		
1917–1918	→ Clyde (loan)	8	(3)
1918–1919	→ Third Lanark (loan)	6	(2)
1919–1920	Bury	2	(0)

Managerial career
- 1919–1923: Bury
- 1930–1931: Rochdale
- * Club domestic league appearances and goals

William Smith Cameron (2 December 1883 – 14 October 1958) was a Scottish football player and manager whose position was mainly as an inside forward, though he was versatile and also played in the centre, on the wing and at half back during his career.

== Playing career ==
Cameron's playing career, during which he acquired the nickname 'Kilty', was largely characterised by short periods at several clubs in northern England and south-west Scotland. Born at Mossend, Lanarkshire, though much of his early life was spent in Coatbridge where his father worked in the local ironworks, he moved to Bolton Wanderers owing to that town's connections to heavy industry, having initially moved south to play for Glossop.

His longest spell was at Blackburn Rovers, where he spent five seasons and was part of the squad that won the Football League championship in 1911–12, alongside the likes of fellow Scots Walter Aitkenhead, Johnny Orr and Jock Simpson; he was not an undisputed regular in the team at Ewood Park, but his ability to fill in at several positions meant he was often called upon. On paper, he was also contracted to Hull City for five years, but in reality he only played there for 18 months before World War I led to the cancellation of official competitions in English football; he had a number of short loans at clubs in the Greater Glasgow area (the Scottish Football League continued) and served in the Royal Army Ordnance Corps during the conflict.

At representative level, he appeared in the Home Scots v Anglo-Scots annual trial match in 1909 but did not gain any full caps for Scotland.

== Managerial career ==
In 1919, Cameron became player-manager of Second Division Bury and spent four seasons in charge of the Shakers before being issued with a life ban in 1923 following an investigation into an incident three years earlier when Bury were found to have accepted payments from Coventry City officials to deliberately lose their end-of-season fixture and save Coventry from relegation at the expense of Lincoln City (the extent of his involvement in the incident is not clear).

Cameron's ban was eventually lifted in 1929 and he managed Rochdale for the unsuccessful 1930–31 season when they had to seek re-election to the Third Division North, and the first half of 1931–32 which was equally poor and eventually ended with the same outcome.

== Later life ==
Cameron settled with his family in Bolton, where by the outbreak of World War II in 1939 he was working at the de Havilland Propellers factory. He was not related to Jock Cameron, another Blackburn Rovers player of the era who also grew up in the Coatbridge area and settled in Lancashire.
