= Avdiu =

Avdiu is a surname. Notable people with the surname include:

- Kemajl Avdiu (born 1976), Swedish Albanian footballer
- Diana Avdiu (born 1972), Kosovar Albanian model
