= John Stiles (footballer) =

English footballer

Personal information
- Full name: John Charles Stiles
- Date of birth: 6 May 1964 (age 62)
- Place of birth: Manchester, England
- Height: 5 ft 9 in (1.75 m)
- Position: Midfielder

Senior career*
Years	Team	Apps	(Gls)
1982–1983	Shamrock Rovers	5	(0)
1983–1984	Vancouver Whitecaps	16	(?)
1983–1984	Vancouver Whitecaps (indoor)		
1984–1989	Leeds United	65	(2)
1989–1992	Doncaster Rovers	89	(2)
1991–1992	→ Rochdale (loan)	4	(0)
1993–1997	Gainsborough Trinity		
- * Club domestic league appearances and goals

John Charles Stiles (born 6 May 1964) is an English former professional footballer and the son of 1966 World Cup-winner Nobby Stiles and nephew of Johnny Giles.

Stiles made over 150 Football League appearances in total, having played for Leeds United and Doncaster Rovers. He finished his career with Gainsborough Trinity.

He made two appearances in European competition for Shamrock Rovers in the 1982–83 UEFA Cup.

He is now a comedian.

== Honours ==
Shamrock Rovers

- Leinster Senior Cup: 1982
