= Paul Barnes (footballer) =

English association football player

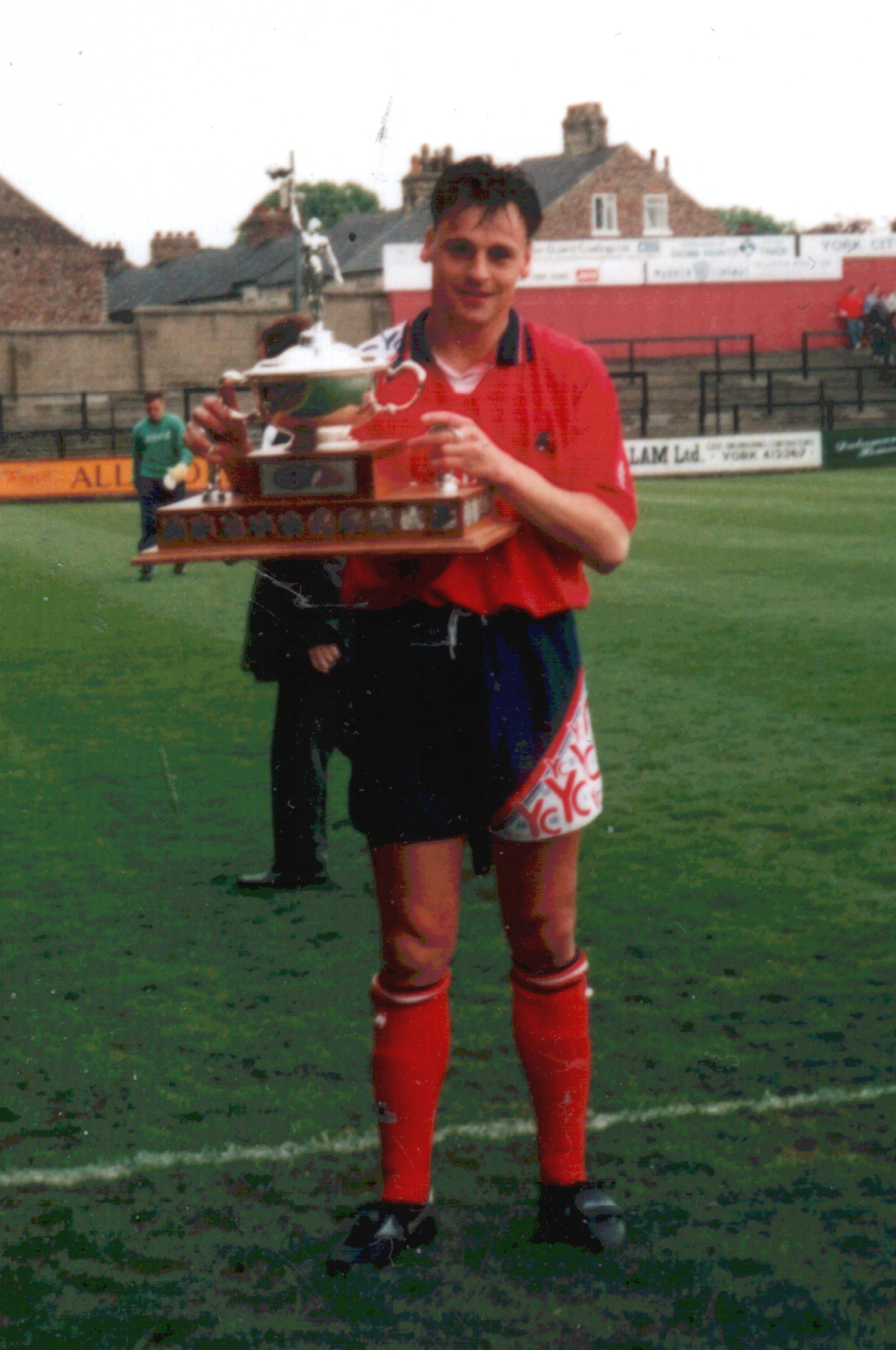
- Barnes pictured in 1994 with the York City Clubman of the Year trophy

Personal information
- Full name: Paul Lance Barnes
- Date of birth: 16 November 1967 (age 58)
- Place of birth: Leicester, England
- Height: 5 ft 10 in (1.78 m)
- Position: Striker

Senior career*
Years	Team	Apps	(Gls)
1985–1990	Notts County	53	(14)
1990–1992	Stoke City	24	(3)
1990	→ Chesterfield (loan)	1	(0)
1992–1996	York City	148	(76)
1996	Birmingham City	15	(7)
1996–1998	Burnley	65	(30)
1998–1999	Huddersfield Town	30	(2)
1999–2001	Bury	54	(8)
2001	→ Nuneaton Borough (loan)	9	(10)
2001–2003	Doncaster Rovers	71	(31)
2003–2004	Tamworth	18	(4)
2004–2005	Hinckley United		
Total		488	(185)
- * Club domestic league appearances and goals

Paul Lance Barnes (born 16 November 1967) is an English former professional footballer who played as a striker in the Football League for Notts County, Stoke City, Chesterfield, York City, Birmingham City, Burnley, Huddersfield Town, Bury and Doncaster Rovers.

== Career ==
Born in Leicester, Barnes completed an apprenticeship with Notts County before signing a professional contract in November 1985, making his debut in February 1986. He played five seasons with the Magpies, scoring 19 goals in 67 appearances and helping them on their way to promotion in 1989–90. He joined Stoke City on transfer deadline day in 1989–90, being one of a large number of players signed by Alan Ball in an attempt to avoid relegation. Barnes played in five matches as Stoke failed to mount a revival and were relegated to the third tier. He played in seven matches for Stoke in 1990–91, and also had a short spell on loan at Chesterfield. Under Lou Macari in 1991–92 he found himself in the reserves due to the form of Wayne Biggins and Mark Stein. He played in 18 matches scoring four goals and was an unused substitute in the 1992 Football League Trophy final. York City manager John Ward spotted Barnes in Stoke's reserves and signed him in July 1992.

Barnes began scoring goals for York quickly and he netted 21 times as York won promotion in 1993. The following year, he scored 24 times and won the Clubman of the Year trophy. In September 1995, he hit the national headlines when he scored twice in City's 3–0 victory over Manchester United at Old Trafford in a second-round League Cup tie, and he almost scored a hat trick, but his third goal was ruled offside. Barnes was eventually sold to Birmingham City for a fee of £350,000 in March 1996.

Six months later, Burnley paid a club record fee of £375,000 for his services. He scored 30 goals in 65 league matches for the Turf Moor club, which included all five goals in a 5–2 victory over Stockport County. Barnes left Burnley in January 1998 for Huddersfield Town in a swap deal with Andy Payton, but failed to establish himself in the Huddersfield side and left for Bury in March 1999 for a £40,000 fee.

In 2003, he helped Doncaster Rovers gain promotion back to the Football League from the Football Conference, winning the Golden Boot in the process. Barnes then signed for non-league Tamworth, before finishing his playing career at Hinckley United.

== Personal life ==
Barnes' son, Harvey Barnes, also became a professional footballer.

== Career statistics ==
Appearances and goals by club, season and competition
Club	Season	League			FA Cup		League Cup		Other^{[A]}		Total	
Club	Season	Division	Apps	Goals	Apps	Goals	Apps	Goals	Apps	Goals	Apps	Goals
Notts County	1985–86	Third Division	14	4	0	0	0	0	0	0	14	4
Notts County	1986–87	Third Division	0	0	0	0	0	0	1	0	1	0
Notts County	1987–88	Third Division	11	2	1	0	0	0	4	3	16	2
Notts County	1988–89	Third Division	15	7	0	0	0	0	2	0	17	7
Notts County	1989–90	Third Division	13	1	0	0	0	0	6	2	19	3
Notts County	Total		53	14	1	0	0	0	13	5	67	19
Stoke City	1989–90	Second Division	5	0	0	0	0	0	0	0	5	0
Stoke City	1990–91	Third Division	6	0	0	0	0	0	1	1	7	1
Stoke City	1991–92	Third Division	13	3	0	0	2	0	3	1	18	4
Stoke City	Total		24	3	0	0	2	0	4	2	30	5
Chesterfield (loan)	1990–91	Fourth Division	1	0	1	1	0	0	0	0	2	1
York City	1992–93	Third Division	40	21	1	0	2	0	4	0	47	21
York City	1993–94	Second Division	42	24	1	0	1	0	5	1	49	25
York City	1994–95	Second Division	36	16	2	0	2	0	2	1	42	17
York City	1995–96	Second Division	30	15	1	0	5	5	5	2	41	22
York City	Total		148	76	5	0	10	5	16	4	179	85
Birmingham City	1995–96	First Division	15	7	0	0	0	0	0	0	15	7
Burnley	1996–97	Second Division	40	24	3	1	2	0	0	0	45	25
Burnley	1997–98	Second Division	25	6	2	0	3	0	0	0	30	6
Burnley	Total		65	30	5	1	5	0	0	0	75	31
Huddersfield Town	1997–98	First Division	15	1	0	0	0	0	0	0	15	1
Huddersfield Town	1998–99	First Division	15	1	2	0	3	0	0	0	20	1
Huddersfield Town	Total		30	2	2	0	3	0	0	0	35	2
Bury	1998–99	First Division	8	0	0	0	0	0	0	0	8	0
Bury	1999–2000	Second Division	30	4	2	0	1	0	1	0	34	4
Bury	2000–01	Second Division	16	4	2	0	0	0	1	0	19	4
Bury	Total		54	8	4	0	1	0	2	0	61	8
Nuneaton Borough (loan)	2000–01	Football Conference	9	10	0	0	0	0	1	0	10	10
Doncaster Rovers	2001–02	Football Conference	23	6	1	0	0	0	2	1	26	7
Doncaster Rovers	2002–03	Football Conference	41	25	1	0	0	0	5	1	47	26
Doncaster Rovers	2003–04	Third Division	7	0	1	0	2	1	2	0	11	1
Doncaster Rovers	Total		71	31	3	0	2	1	9	2	84	34
Tamworth	2003–04	Football Conference	18	4	0	0	0	0	1	0	19	4
Career total			488	185	21	2	23	6	46	13	578	206

A. The "Other" column constitutes appearances and goals in the Conference League Cup, FA Trophy, Football League play-offs and Football League Trophy.

== Honours ==
York City

- Football League Third Division play-offs: 1993

Doncaster Rovers

- Football Conference play-offs: 2003

Individual

- York City Clubman of the Year: 1993–94
- Football Conference Team of the Year: 2002–03
- Football Conference Goalscorer of the Year: 2002–03
- Football Conference Goalscorer of the Month (2): December 2002, February 2003
