= Nicky Hill =

English footballer

Personal information
- Full name: Nicky Hill
- Date of birth: 26 February 1981 (age 45)
- Place of birth: Accrington, England
- Height: 6 ft 0 in (1.83 m)
- Position: Defender

Senior career*
Years	Team	Apps	(Gls)
1999–2003	Bury	23	(0)
2002–2003	→ Leigh RMI (loan)		(9)
2003	Leigh RMI	10	(0)
2003–2006	Hyde United	75	(7)
Total		111	(3)
- * Club domestic league appearances and goals

Nicky Hill (born 26 February 1981) in Accrington, England, is an English retired professional footballer who played as a defender for Bury in the Football League.
