= 2019–20 Bury F.C. season =

Bury
2019–20 season
- Chairman: Steven Dale
- Manager: Paul Wilkinson
- Stadium: Gigg Lane
- EFL League One: Expelled
- EFL Cup: First round (eliminated by walkover)
- FA Cup: Expelled from competition

The 2019–20 season was Bury's 135th season since the club was founded in 1885, and their first back in League One following the promotion from EFL League Two in the 2018–19 season. Bury were expelled from the EFL on 27 August 2019, bringing their season to a premature end.

== Pre-season ==
The Shakers announced a pre-season friendly against Blackburn Rovers.

13 July 2019 Friendly	Nantwich Town	1–1	Bury	Nantwich
15:00 BST	Mwasile 67'	Report	Archer 48'	Stadium: Weaver Stadium; Attendance: 424

16 July 2019 Friendly	Bury	P–P	West Bromwich Albion	Bury
				Stadium: Gigg Lane
Note: Match cancelled due to West Brom's pre season tour being extended.

19 July 2019 Friendly	Bury	1–3	(Saudi Arabia) Al-Ittihad	Bury
14:00 BST	13'	Report	Al-Aboud 26'; Romarinho 52'; Jiménez 62'

24 July 2019 Friendly	Bury	0–3	Blackburn Rovers	Bury
19:45 BST		Report	Rothwell 26'; Brereton 38'; Armstrong 90'	Stadium: Gigg Lane; Attendance: 1,351

27 July 2019 Friendly	Port Vale	1–2	Bury	Burslem
15:00 BST	Cullen 63'	Report	Bunn 23'; Archer 38'	Stadium: Vale Park; Attendance: 801

30 July 2019 Friendly	Radcliffe	1–3	Bury	Radcliffe
19:30 BST	Wharton 59'		Mottley-Henry 10', 73'; J. Roberts 69'	Stadium: Neuven Stadium

== Competitions ==
=== Matches ===
==== League table ====
Pos	Team	Pld	W	D	L	GF	GA	GD	Pts	PPG	Promotion, qualification or relegation
17	Accrington Stanley	35	10	10	15	47	53	−6	40	1.14	
18	Rochdale	34	10	6	18	39	57	−18	36	1.06	
19	Milton Keynes Dons	35	10	7	18	36	47	−11	37	1.06	
20	AFC Wimbledon	35	8	11	16	39	52	−13	35	1.00	
21	Tranmere Rovers (R)	34	8	8	18	36	60	−24	32	0.94	Relegation to EFL League Two
22	Southend United (R)	35	4	7	24	39	85	−46	19	0.54	Relegation to EFL League Two
23	Bolton Wanderers (R)	34	5	11	18	27	66	−39	14 (Note: Bolton Wanderers deducted 12 points for entering administration.)	0.41	Relegation to EFL League Two
24	Bury	0	0	0	0	0	0	0	−12 (Note: Bury deducted 12 points for entering into an insolvency event, before later being expelled from the EFL on 27 August 2019. At the time of their expulsion, they had played no matches.)	—	Club expelled

Source: EFL Official Website
Rules for classification: 1) Points per game; 2) Goal difference; 3) Number of goals scored; 4) Head-to-head results; 5) Wins; 6) Away goals; 7) Penalty points (sec 9.5); 8) 12-point sending-off offences
(R) Relegated
Notes:

On Thursday, 20 June 2019, the EFL League One fixtures were announced.

Bury were expelled from the English Football League on 27 August 2019 after failing to satisfy the criteria provided within their notice of withdrawal from the EFL, by a deadline of 5PM BST on this date. The club failed to fulfil any of their League One fixtures in 2019–20 due to their financial crisis, and consequently upon their expulsion, 2019–20 EFL League Two only relegated 1 team to the National League, instead of the usual 2.

==== Matches ====
3 August 2019	Bury	P–P	Milton Keynes Dons	Bury
15:00 BST				Stadium: Planet-U Energy Stadium
Note: The match was suspended by the Football League on 30 July 2019 due to Bury's financial issues.

10 August 2019	Accrington Stanley	P–P	Bury	Accrington
15:00 BST				Stadium: Crown Ground
Note: The match was suspended by the Football League on 02 August 2019 due to Bury's financial issues.

17 August 2019	Bury	P–P	Gillingham	Bury
15:00 BST				Stadium: Planet-U Energy Stadium
Note: The match was suspended by the Football League on 13 August 2019 due to Bury's financial issues.

20 August 2019	Rotherham United	P–P	Bury	Rotherham
15:00 BST				Stadium: New York Stadium
Note: The match was suspended by the Football League on 15 August 2019 due to Bury's financial issues.

24 August 2019	Tranmere Rovers	P–P	Bury	Birkenhead
15:00 BST				Stadium: Prenton Park
Note: The match was suspended by the Football League on 20 August 2019 due to Bury's financial issues.

=== EFL Cup ===
13 August 2019 First round	Sheffield Wednesday	w/o	Bury	Owlerton
19:45 BST				Stadium: Hillsborough Stadium
Note: The match was suspended by the Football League on 08 August 2019 due to Bury's financial issues. On 20 August 2019 Sheffield Wednesday were awarded a bye to the next round of the competition, as Bury were unable to fulfil the fixture.

=== FA Cup ===
Bury were expelled from the FA Cup before the first round draw was made. Chichester City were given a bye to the second round as a result of Bury being removed from the competition.

== Transfers ==
=== Transfers out ===
Date	Position	Nationality	Name	To	Fee	Ref.
1 July 2019	RM	(Wales)	Nicky Adams	(England) Northampton Town	Free transfer	
1 July 2019	CB	(Scotland)	Tom Aldred	(Australia) Brisbane Roar	Free transfer	
1 July 2019	CB	(England)	Sam Allardyce	(England) Oxford United	Undisclosed	
1 July 2019	CM	(England)	Scott Burgess	(England) Port Vale	Free transfer	
1 July 2019	LM	(England)	Danny Mayor	(England) Plymouth Argyle	Free transfer	
1 July 2019	AM	(Republic of Ireland)	Jay O'Shea	(Australia) Brisbane Roar	Free transfer	
2 July 2019	CB	(England)	Will Aimson	(England) Plymouth Argyle	Free transfer	
2 July 2019	CF	(England)	Nicky Maynard	(England) Mansfield Town	Free transfer	
2 July 2019	LB	(England)	Chris Stokes	(England) Stevenage	Free transfer	
4 July 2019	GK	(Republic of Ireland)	Joe Murphy	(England) Shrewsbury Town	Free transfer	
4 July 2019	CB	(Republic of Ireland)	Eoghan O'Connell	(England) Rochdale	Free transfer	
8 July 2019	CF	(England)	Chris Sang	(England) Barnsley	Free transfer	
11 July 2019	CF	(England)	Dom Telford	(England) Plymouth Argyle	Undisclosed	
15 July 2019	RB	(England)	Ryan Cooney	(England) Burnley	Free transfer	
15 July 2019	LM	(Scotland)	Callum McFadzean	(England) Plymouth Argyle	Free transfer	
19 July 2019	LM	(Wales)	Joe Adams	(England) Brentford	Undisclosed	
23 July 2019	RW	(England)	Byron Moore	(England) Plymouth Argyle	Free transfer	
1 August 2019	RB	(England)	Phil Edwards	(England) Accrington Stanley	Free transfer	
9 August 2019	MF	(England)	Callum Hulme	(England) Leicester City	Undisclosed	
10 August 2019	RB	(England)	Dougie Nyaupembe	(England) Prescot Cables	Free transfer	
13 August 2019	LB	(England)	Joe Skarz	(England) Kettering Town F.C.	Free transfer	
25 August 2019	CF	(Switzerland)	Gold Omotayo	(England) Yeovil Town	Free transfer	
27 August 2019	CB	(Northern Ireland)	Adam Thompson	(England) Rotherham United	Free transfer	
27 August 2019	CF	(England)	Jermaine Beckford	Retired		
31 August 2019	CF	(England)	Jordan McFarlane-Archer	(England) Port Vale	Free transfer	
19 September 2019	CM	(Guyana)	Neil Danns	(England) Tranmere Rovers	Free transfer	
21 September 2019	CB	(England)	Saul Shotton	(England) West Bromwich Albion	Free transfer	
1 October 2019	DF	(England)	Bobby Copping	(England) Peterborough United	Free transfer	
12 October 2019	CM	(Republic of Ireland)	Stephen Dawson	(England) Hereford	Free transfer	
15 January 2020	LM	(England)	Harry Bunn	(Scotland) Kilmarnock	Free transfer	
7 February 2020	RB	(England)	Tom Miller	(England) AFC Fylde	Free transfer	
