= Lutel James =

English footballer

Personal information
- Full name: Lutel Kieron James
- Date of birth: 2 June 1972 (age 54)
- Place of birth: Manchester, England
- Position: Striker

Team information
- Current team: Goole (manager)

Senior career*
Years	Team	Apps	(Gls)
1990–1991	Selby Town		
1991–1993	Yorkshire Amateurs		
1993	Scarborough	6	(0)
1993–1996	Guiseley		
1996–1998	Hyde United	85	(29)
1998–2001	Bury	68	(4)
2001–2005	Accrington Stanley	142	(73)
2004	→ Droylsden (loan)	2	(1)
2005–2006	Altrincham	3	(0)
2005	→ Garforth Town (loan)		
2006	Bradford Park Avenue	9	(4)

International career^{‡}
2000	Saint Kitts and Nevis	2	(0)

Managerial career
- 2020–: Goole
- * Club domestic league appearances and goals as of 02:30, 1 January 2007 (UTC) ‡ National team caps and goals as of 15:50, 25 October 2011 (UTC)

Lutel Malik James (born 2 June 1972) is a former professional footballer, who played as a striker in the English Football League with Scarborough and Bury, and who represented Saint Kitts and Nevis internationally.

== Playing career ==
After playing for Hyde United, James signed for Bury in October 1998 on a £200-per-week deal. He was released by Bury in the summer of 2001. Despite praise from manager Andy Preece, the club was suffering from financial difficulties and was unable to offer James a new deal.

James signed for Acrrington Stanley ahead of the 2001/02 season. He scored 20 goals in his first season with the club and helped them earn promotion to the Conference. He was involved in an FA Cup win over Huddersfield Town. In October 2004, James spoke of his desire to leave Accrington after a lack of playing time and requested a transfer. After a three-month loan spell with Droylsden, he signed for Altrincham on a non-contract deal. He spent a short period on loan with Garforth Town before making his Altrincham debut against Southport. He was released by the club in November 2005 after making four total appearances.

== Managerial career ==
James coached at Farsley Celtic academy.

In June 2020 he was appointed joint manager of Goole alongside Les Nelson.

== International career ==
James represented St Kitts and Nevis internationally in World Cup qualifiers in April 2000. In 2004, he declined a call up to the national team to focus on playing for his club side.

== Personal life ==
After finishing his playing career, James worked as CEO of a Leeds-based youth club, Chapeltown Youth Development Centre.

As of 2022, James was a director at Yorkshire Amateur.
