= Andy Rowland =

Andy or Andrew Rowland may refer to:

- Andy Rowland (footballer, born 1954) (1954–2024), English footballer
- Andy Rowland (footballer, born 1965) (1965–2017), English footballer

== See also ==
- A. R. B. Thomas (Andrew Rowland Benedick Thomas, 1904–1985), English chess player
- Andy Hill (footballer) (Andrew Rowland Hill, born 1965), English footballer
