= Barry Shuttleworth =

English footballer

Personal information
- Full name: Barry Shuttleworth
- Date of birth: 9 July 1977 (age 49)
- Place of birth: Accrington, England
- Position: Defender

Senior career*
| Years | Team | Apps | (Gls) |
| 1995–1997 | Bury | 0 | (0) |
| 1997–1998 | Rotherham United | 5 | (0) |
| 1999–2000 | Blackpool | 26 | (1) |
| 2000–2001 | Scarborough | 12 | |
| 2001–2002 | Macclesfield Town | 3 | (0) |
| | Accrington Stanley | 15 | |
| 2009-2011 | Ramsbottom United | 44 | (0) |
| 2012 | Ramsbottom United | 1 | (0) |
- * Club domestic league appearances and goals

Barry Shuttleworth (born 9 July 1977) is an English former footballer who played in the Football League for Blackpool and Macclesfield Town.
