= Mark Carter (footballer) =

English footballer

Personal information
- Full name: Mark Colin Carter
- Date of birth: 17 December 1960 (age 65)
- Place of birth: Liverpool, England
- Position: Striker

Youth career
- 1978–1979: Liverpool

Senior career*
Years	Team	Apps	(Gls)
1979–1982	South Liverpool	?	(?)
1982–1984	Bangor City	74	(27)
1984–1991	Runcorn	255	(144)
1991–1993	Barnet	82	(30)
1993–1997	Bury	134	(62)
1997–1998	Rochdale	11	(2)
1997–1998	→ Gateshead (loan)	8	(1)
1998–1999	Ashton United	20	(19)
1999–2000	Runcorn	?	(?)
2001	Radcliffe Borough	25	(5)
2001–2002	Glossop North End	?	(?)

International career
1987–1991	England Semi-Pro	11	(13)
- * Club domestic league appearances and goals as of 10:32, 17 Jun 2025 (UTC)

Mark Colin Carter (born 17 December 1960 in Liverpool, England) is an English former footballer.

Mark Carter, more commonly known to all as Spike, was a lethal goal scorer. He plied his trade almost exclusively in the non league of English & Welsh Football until he was signed by Barry Fry for Barnet. Fry was preparing his club for a final push for Football League status and promotion from the GM Football Conference. Duly promoted Carter was able to pit his scoring skills against professional defences and managed just short of 100 goals at Barnet then Bury and finally Rochdale.

After that he returned to non-league football with Ashton United, Runcorn, Radcliffe Borough and Glossop North End.

He played for Bootle Cricket Club in the Liverpool and District Cricket Competition.

Carter is the leading scorer of the England semi-pro team, with 13 goals in 11 appearances.

== Honours ==
Bury

- Football League Second Division: 1996–97
