= Chris Swailes =

English footballer (born 1970)

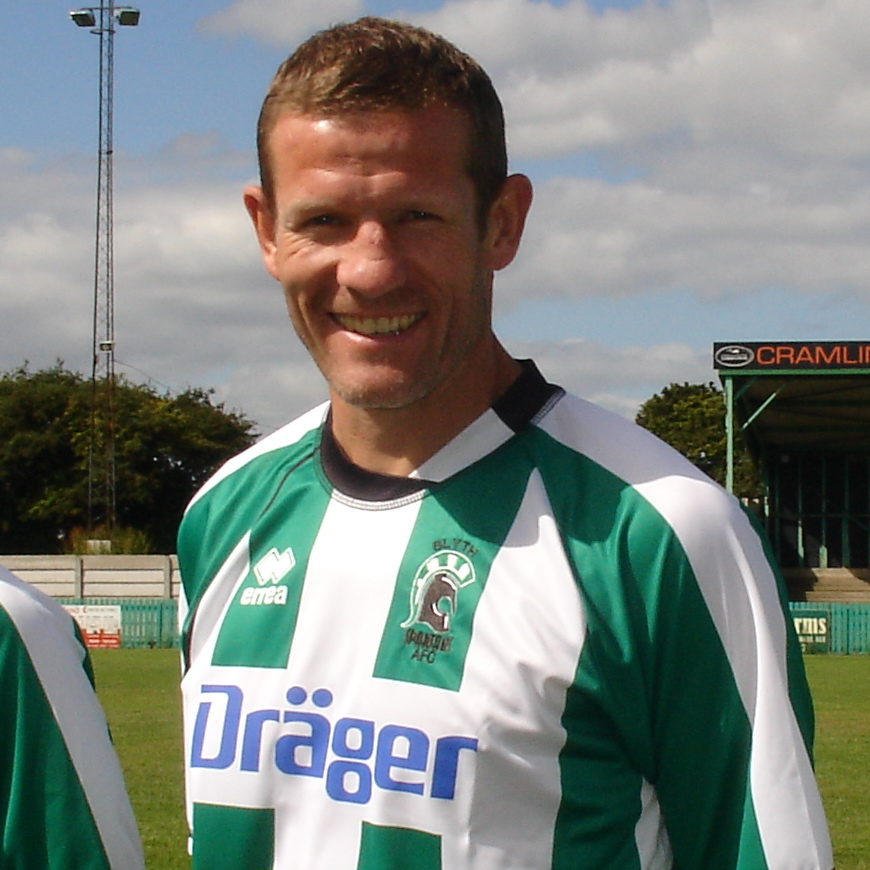
- Swailes in Blyth Spartans colours

Personal information
- Full name: Christopher William Swailes
- Date of birth: 19 October 1970 (age 56)
- Place of birth: Gateshead, England
- Position: Defender

Youth career
- 1989–1991: Ipswich Town

Senior career*
Years	Team	Apps	(Gls)
1991	Peterborough United	0	(0)
1991–1992	Boston United	30	(1)
1991	→ Kettering Town (loan)	6	(0)
1991–1992	→ Birmingham City (loan)	0	(0)
1992–1993	Bridlington Town	5	(0)
1993	→ Guisborough Town (loan)	11	(3)
1993–1995	Doncaster Rovers	49	(0)
1995–1997	Ipswich Town	37	(1)
1997–2001	Bury	127	(13)
2001–2005	Rotherham United	167	(14)
2005–2007	Oldham Athletic	19	(0)
2007–2009	Hamilton Academical	52	(10)
2009–2010	Gateshead	23	(0)
2010–2011	Blyth Spartans	48	(2)
2011–2014	Dunston UTS	98	(15)
2015–2016	Morpeth Town	9	(0)
Total		681	(59)

Managerial career
- 2016–2023: Dunston UTS
- * Club domestic league appearances and goals

Christopher William Swailes (born 19 October 1970) is an English former professional footballer who played as a defender.

== Playing career ==
=== Early days ===
Swailes was a trainee at Ipswich Town from 1989 to 1991, eventually moving to Peterborough United on 28 March 1991 for a fee of £10,000, after turning down a contract offered by the Ipswich manager at the time, John Lyall. Five months later, he moved on to Boston United of the GM Vauxhall Conference on a free transfer, after feeling homesick for the North East. He played only part-time for them, going out on loan to Kettering and Third Division Birmingham City for a while, before signing for Bridlington Town, again for free. After a short spell on loan to Guisborough Town, he followed the Bridlington chairman Ken Richardson to Doncaster Rovers, then in the Third Division, for no fee (once again).

In 54 appearances for Doncaster over the next 17 months, he scored one League Cup goal in a first round, second leg, away fixture at Wrexham on 23 August 1994.

=== Ipswich Town ===
In March 1995, the new Ipswich Town manager George Burley paid £150,000 for Swailes to return to his former club. Unfortunately, in his first Premier League game for them at home to Aston Villa on 1 April 1995, he scored an own goal in stoppage time at the end of the match, to confirm a 1–0 defeat. Ipswich were relegated to the First Division at the end of that season.

Over the next two and a half years, he made just 47 appearances in League, Cup and other games for them, scoring only once. The bulk of his contribution came in the 1996–97 season, when he was given an extended run. Ipswich finished in fourth spot and entered the First Division playoffs, but lost on the away goals rule after extra time in the semi-final second leg at home to Sheffield United, Swailes being replaced by Kieron Dyer in the 91st minute.

=== Bury ===
On 13 November 1997, Stan Ternent, the manager of Bury, also in the First Division at that time, paid a club record fee of £200,000 for Swailes (which still stands). He was included in the Shakers' team for their away match at Oxford United two days later, and promptly scored an equalising goal for them in a 1–1 draw. Although Swailes subsequently found it hard to maintain a run of appearances in the first team under Ternent, his fortunes looked up a little after Neil Warnock took over as manager in 1998, and he missed only three games through suspension during the 1998–99 season. Despite this, Bury were relegated at the end of that term. Swailes was quoted as saying: "[P]robably Stan cracked the whip more than Neil did which in the end may have been the difference of gaining the extra couple of points we needed, but as professionals we must all share the blame". He was subsequently voted Player of the Year by the Bury Supporters' Association at their prize night in May 1999. "It really is a big surprise for me to get the award," he commented. "I thought I might make the top five at best. But it's a dream come true to be the fans' choice. They are the most important people at the club, they keep it alive and for them to vote for me is marvellous, but I suppose my goal against Bolton helped!

"I like to think the fans can relate to me," he added. "I know I'm of limited ability but I always give 100 per cent on the pitch and I think the supporters appreciate that. But I'd gladly sacrifice the award for First Division survival."

Whilst with Bury, Swailes lived in Ramsbottom with his wife Louise and their recent addition to the family, a daughter. However, the good fortune which had blessed him around that period was about to disappear.

During the following season, in a match at home to Millwall on 4 January 2000 (his last game before a three-match ban was due to commence for getting sent off at Burnley on Boxing Day 1999), Swailes suffered a double hernia, but played on to the end of the match, and ended up in hospital. He was not fit enough to play for the reserves until mid-April, and did not taste first team football again until completing ninety minutes in the home Second Division fixture against Blackpool on 22 April 2000, which they won 3–2.

By this time, Andy Preece had taken over as player/manager at Gigg Lane, and things were never the same for Swailes after this period. In all, he made 148 appearances for them, scoring on 11 occasions.

Although he was offered a new one, in June 2001 Chris Swailes' contract with Bury expired, and he was then able to move on a free transfer under the Bosman ruling. In reaction to an enquiry towards the end of May that year from Ronnie Moore of Rotherham United, Bury had asked for a £100,000 fee – however, they refused to pay this.

=== Rotherham ===
On 19 June 2001, Swailes signed a contract with newly promoted Rotherham, and looked forward to a new season playing in the Football League First Division. Throughout season 2001–02, Swailes was an ever-present, making 44 league appearances and scoring 6 league goals. However, the club exited both the FA Cup and the League Cup early, and avoided relegation only by having a better goal difference than Crewe, who went down occupying the third-from-bottom position in the First Division.

In the 2002–03 season, Swailes was sent off by referee Graham Laws shortly before half-time in a First Division match at home to Portsmouth on 5 October 2002. His manager, Ronnie Moore, bemoaned the referee's contribution to the game, saying: "One man has spoiled the game. It would have been a game, a hell of a game." The incident which led to Swailes' sending-off was described by The Guardian thus:

"...Chris Swailes, running side by side with Svetoslav Todorov, nudged his hip into the Portsmouth forward with as much menace as a ballroom partner. But Todorov went down and sent the referee Graham Laws reaching for red."

Regarding the sending-off, Moore would only say: "If he [Todorov] could have scored from there, I'm a Dutchman".

Swailes and Rotherham finished the season just below mid-table. Much the same happened in the following season, although they were involved in a "sensational shoot-out" following a 1–1 draw, after extra time, at Arsenal in the League Cup third round on 28 October 2003. Arsenal won the penalty competition 9–8, after Swailes had missed his "sudden death" spot-kick, leaving Sylvain Wiltord to claim victory by converting his.

However, in 2004–05, despite Swailes playing 37 League games and scoring two goals, Rotherham were relegated from the newly named Football League Championship, winning only 5 matches and finishing bottom. Moore resigned as manager in January 2005, and took up the challenge of leading League One Oldham Athletic in March that year. This was to be a significant occurrence regarding the future of Chris Swailes.

=== Oldham Athletic ===
Swailes followed his Rotherham teammates Paul Warne and Rob Scott to Boundary Park in July 2005 on a free transfer, signing a two-year contract for Ronnie Moore. However, he was immediately injured in training, suffering a damaged heel. He would not make his debut for Oldham until the 0–0 home draw against Southend United on 7 January 2006, coming on as a substitute in the 51st minute. He then aggravated the problem in a training session before the game at Blackpool on 10 January 2006.

He struggled on, "taking pills just to get through games", and played in only 15 matches that season, between his debut and 15 April 2006, when he had to be substituted in the 51st minute in a 3–0 loss at home to Barnsley. However, despite surgery in the summer, which enabled him to play four times at the beginning of the 2006–07 season, Swailes had to undergo a further operation, about which he said: "I am again in a lot of pain and it has just got worse. I had a feeling I might need more surgery and I just have to hope for the best".

Following the sacking of manager Moore and the club's appointment of John Sheridan to replace him, the new man "decided to pay up the remainder of the player's contract", and Swailes was released.

=== Hamilton Academical ===
Swailes made his recovery on schedule in February 2007, and then went on trial to Scottish First Division Hamilton Academical, registering in time to come on as a 23rd-minute substitute in their away match at Clyde on 10 March 2007. By April, manager Billy Reid was so impressed, he offered Swailes a contract extension. "We're going to sign Chris Swailes up on a pay-as-you-play contract. I think he's been brilliant for us at the back and adds a wealth of experience," he said. "If Chris can get a pre-season under his belt, and we can get him, Mark McLaughlin and Davie Elebert playing together then we're in healthy hands in defence."

In July 2007, he signed a further one-year deal, as a part-time player, allowing him to travel up for games from his base in the North East of England.

Since then, he has been an integral part of the team, making regular appearances in defence, scoring the second goal in a 2–0 win at Partick Thistle in November 2007, but getting sent off in a Scottish Cup tie away to Brechin in January 2008.

=== Later playing career ===
Following Swailes release from Hamilton, he joined his home town club Gateshead on 15 June 2009 who had been newly promoted to the Conference National. "I'm a Gateshead lad and a number of my friends are members of the Heed Army so this is a great move for me, and it would be great to end my career at Gateshead". Swailes made his debut for Gateshead against Tamworth on 18 August 2009. Swailes scored his first goal for Gateshead in the FA Trophy First Round replay away at Harrogate Town on 15 December 2009. Swailes was released by Gateshead at the end of the 2009–10 season.

In June 2010, Swailes joined Blyth Spartans as assistant manager, and in addition was registered as a player. He scored his first goal for Blyth Spartans on 24 October 2010 with a super header as part of a 3–0 win over Hyde. Swailes joined Dunston UTS on 10 June 2011.

He returned to playing in 2016 with Morpeth Town, after leaving the position of assistant manager with Hamilton Academical. On 22 May 2016, Swailes won the FA Vase for the third time as Morpeth Town beat Hereford FC 4–1, with him also becoming the oldest-ever goalscorer in a Wembley final at the age of 45.

== Coaching career ==
Swailes was appointed assistant manager of Hamilton Academical in January 2015 by new manager Martin Canning. He resigned from this position in March, citing his wish to work closer to his home in the north-east of England. In October 2016 he was appointed manager of Dunston UTS.

On 25 April 2023, Swailes departed the club.

== Honours ==
Bridlington Town

- FA Vase: 1992–93

Hamilton Academical

- Scottish Football League First Division: 2007–08

Dunston UTS

- FA Vase: 2011–12
- Northern Football League: 2018–19

Morpeth Town

- FA Vase: 2015–16
