= Dean Barrick =

English footballer

Personal information
- Full name: Dean Barrick
- Date of birth: 30 September 1969 (age 57)
- Place of birth: Hemsworth, England
- Height: 5 ft 7 in (1.70 m)
- Position: Full back

Senior career*
Years	Team	Apps	(Gls)
1988–1991	Sheffield Wednesday	11	(2)
1991–1993	Rotherham United	99	(7)
1993–1995	Cambridge United	91	(3)
1995–1998	Preston North End	109	(1)
1998–2001	Bury	47	(1)
1999	→ Ayr United (loan)	11	(0)
2001	→ Doncaster Rovers (loan)	11	(1)
2001–2003	Doncaster Rovers	51	(1)
2002	→ Hereford United (loan)	7	(0)
2003	Nuneaton Borough	11	(0)
2003–2005	Hucknall Town	79	(2)
Total		527	(18)

Managerial career
- 2004–2006: Hucknall Town
- * Club domestic league appearances and goals

Dean Barrick (born 30 September 1969) is an English former footballer.

He played primarily as a left back for Preston North End, Rotherham United and Cambridge United amongst other clubs in a career spanning 17 years.

As a manager, he took Hucknall Town to the 2005 FA Trophy final. He was the head of physical education at The British School in Warsaw, Poland.

Dean Barrick was also a physical education teacher at Hatfield Visual Arts College in Hatfield, Doncaster.

== Honours ==
Preston North End

- Football League Third Division: 1995–96
