= Tony Battersby =

Footballer who plays as a striker for Boston Town

Personal information
- Full name: Anthony Battersby
- Date of birth: 30 August 1975 (age 51)
- Place of birth: Doncaster, England
- Position: Striker

Senior career*
Years	Team	Apps	(Gls)
1993–1996	Sheffield United	10	(1)
1994–1995	→ Southend United (loan)	8	(1)
1995	→ BK-IFK (loan)	16	(24)
1995–1997	Notts County	39	(8)
1996–1998	Bury	48	(8)
1998–2003	Lincoln City	130	(21)
1999–2000	→ Northampton Town (loan)	3	(1)
2002–2003	Boston United	11	(1)
2002–2003	Hucknall Town	1	(1)
2002–2003	Rushden & Diamonds	5	(0)
2002–2004	Stevenage Borough	19	(6)
2003–2004	Gravesend & Northfleet	1	(0)
2003–2004	Cambridge City	6	(1)
2004–2005	King's Lynn	12	(4)
2004–2006	Grays Athletic	34	(9)
2005–2006	AFC Wimbledon	7	(1)
2006–2007	Chelmsford City	9	(0)
2006–2007	→ Welling United (loan)	13	(2)
2007–2008	Stamford	?	(?)
2008	Corby Town		
2008	→ Bourne Town (loan)		
2008–2010	Bedford Town		
2009–2011	Stamford		
2010–2011	St Albans City	13	(3)
2011	Deeping Rangers		
2011–2012	Grantham Town		
2012–2013	Spalding United		
2013	Wisbech Town		
2015–2016	Boston Town		
- * Club domestic league appearances and goals as of 21:13, 5 May 2007 (UTC)

Tony Battersby (born 30 August 1975) is an English former professional footballer who played as a striker.

Battersby is one of football's journeymen and has played for many clubs both The Football League and non-League in a career that lasted from 1993 until 2016, notably playing professionally with Lincoln City where he scored 21 times in 130 League appearances. He also played for Sheffield United, Southend United, BK-IFK before later moving to Notts County, Bury, Northampton Town, Boston United and Rushden & Diamonds, before dropping into non-League football. As a semi-professional he played for Hucknall Town, Stevenage Borough, Ebbsfleet United, Cambridge City, King's Lynn, AFC Wimbledon, Grays Athletic, Chelmsford City, Welling United, Stamford, Corby Town, Bourne Town, Bedford Town, St Albans City, Deeping Rangers, Grantham Town, Spalding United, Wisbech Town and Boston Town.

== Professional career ==
Battersby started his career at Sheffield United. In the summer of 1995 Battersby joined Finnish second division club BK-IFK on loan, scoring 24 goals in just 16 appearances for the Vasa club. He attracted the attention of the Premier League-team VPS Vaasa with his performances with the city rivals BK-IFK, but no deal was ever to be as Battersby returned to Sheffield United in the autumn. In the summer of 2001, Battersby agreed a new three-year contract with Lincoln City.

In October 2002, Lincoln announced that a severance package had been agreed with Battersby and he duly left the club, quickly linking up with neighbours Boston United on a three-month contract. He scored on his Boston debut in the 4–2 Football League Trophy home victory over Yeovil Town on 23 October 2002 before marking his league debut with another goal in the 3–1 victory over Rochdale at York Street just three days later. However, he failed to score in his next ten league games for the club and departed at the end of his contract. In January 2003, Battersby linked up with Hucknall Town, scoring a penalty on his debut in the 2–0 away victory over Lincoln United in the UniBond chairman's Cup quarter-final on 25 January 2003. After impressing in two reserve team games, he agreed to join Rushden & Diamonds on a non-contract basis, debuting in the 2–2 draw at Darlington on 8 February 2003. With Rushden having a free Saturday, Battersby returned to Hucknall to play in their 1–1 home draw with Wakefield & Emley on 15 February 2003 before turning out a further four times for Rushden before being released.

== Non-League career ==
He moved onto Football Conference side Stevenage Borough, scoring on his debut in a 2–0 home victory over Kettering Town on 25 March 2003. He scored twice more in four further appearances but his season ended early due to suspension following his sending-off in the 3–1 home victory over Leigh RMI on 5 April 2003.

Battersby began the season well, scoring five times, four in an eight-minute spell, in an 11–0 pre-season victory over Metropolitan Police. In February 2004, having seen a move to Crawley Town for a club record £10,000 fall through, Battersby left Stevenage to join Gravesend & Northfleet. His spell with the Fleet would be short as having come on to make his debut as a 63rd-minute substitute in the 6–0 home victory over Morecambe on 28 February 2004, a groin injury saw him forced off the field just twenty minutes later and Battersby was released from his contract. Returning to fitness, Battersby saw out the remainder of the season with Cambridge City.

In May 2004, Battersby agreed a deal to join King's Lynn. In October 2004, he joined Grays Athletic, debuting in a 4–2 home victory over Welling United on 9 October 2004. Battersby would make 20 league appearances, scoring six times, as Grays went on to claim the Football Conference South title. Grays, with Battersby in the starting eleven, capped the season by claiming the FA Trophy with a victory, on penalties, over Hucknall Town at Villa Park on 22 May 2005.

Grays began their inaugural season in the Football Conference in fine form, enjoying a run of fifteen games without defeat. Battersby also began the season well, scoring Grays's first ever goal in the conference in the 1–1 away draw to Burton Albion on 13 August 2005 and netting twice more in his next four games. However, he sustained an injury in the 2–2 home draw with Kidderminster Harriers on 10 September 2005 and would be sidelined for three months. Returning to fitness, he failed to find the net and in March 2006 he moved on, joining AFC Wimbledon. He made his Dons debut in the 2–1 away victory over Harrow Borough on 21 March 2006 and scored his solitary goal for the club in the return fixture against Harrow Borough on 22 April 2006 which also resulted in a 2–1 victory. However, Wimbledon's dreams of promotion from the Isthmian League ended when Fisher Athletic defeated them 2–1 in the promotion play-off on 2 May 2006; the game would be Battersby's last for the club.

Battersby began the season with Chelmsford City, making his debut as a final minute substitute in the 1–1 home draw with Bromley on 19 August 2006. He struggled to make an impression with Chelmsford: making just three league starts with a further six from the bench and failing to find the net. He moved on to join Welling United debuting as a late substitute in the 1–0 away victory over Cambridge City on 9 December 2006. Battersby was forced to miss the final ten league games of the season to undergo tests on a heart complaint. The Welling manager Adrian Pennock was quoted in the Bexley Times as saying "Everyone at the club has got their fingers crossed for Tony and that everything works out for him. He has an enlarged heart muscle and it is better to be safe than sorry." Fortunately, Battersby was able to resume his football career though his time with Welling was at an end.

In July 2007, Battersby returned to Lincolnshire to link up with Stamford. In February 2008, Stamford's manager Graham Drury departed to manage Corby Town and Battersby was one of seven Stamford players to follow him to the Northamptonshire club.

In August, Battersby moved to Bourne Town on loan, debuting in the 2–0 home defeat to Deeping Rangers on 19 August 2008. In November, Battersby moved on to join Bedford Town, debuting in the goalless draw at home to Clevedon Town on 22 November 2008.

Battersby commenced the season with Bedford Town but, after 37 appearances for the club in all competitions in which he scored nine goals, he rejoined Stamford, debuting in the 2–0 away victory over Cammell Laird on 31 October 2009.

In March 2011 he departed Stamford to join St Albans City. In June 2011 he was appointed player-coach at Deeping Rangers. In late November 2011, Battersby linked up with Northern Premier League Division One South club Grantham Town.
