= Laurent D'Jaffo =

Beninese footballer (born 1970)

Personal information
- Full name: Laurent Mayaba D'Jaffo
- Date of birth: 5 November 1970 (age 55)
- Place of birth: Bazas, France
- Height: 6 ft 0 in (1.83 m)
- Position: Striker

Senior career*
Years	Team	Apps	(Gls)
1991–1995	Montpellier	37	(3)
1995–1996	Chamois Niortais	22	(6)
1996–1997	Red Star Paris	13	(3)
1997–1998	Ayr United	24	(10)
1998–1999	Bury	37	(8)
1999–2000	Stockport County	21	(7)
2000–2002	Sheffield United	69	(11)
2002–2003	Aberdeen	18	(3)
2004	Mansfield Town	8	(1)
Total		249	(52)

International career^{‡}
2002–2004	Benin	3	(0)
- * Club domestic league appearances and goals as of 05:54, 5 May 2009 (UTC) (UTC) ‡ National team caps and goals as of 23:50, 5 May 2009 (UTC)

Laurent Mayaba D'Jaffo (born 5 November 1970) is a retired footballer. Born in France, he represented Benin internationally.

D'Jaffo was born in France but moved to Africa when he was two years old. He moved back to France when he was fourteen where he signed with Montpellier at age sixteen.

D'Jaffo has also played for Mansfield (where he scored on his debut against Hull City), Aberdeen, Ayr United, Bury, Stockport County and Sheffield United. D'Jaffo since retired and is now working as a football agent, assisting Sheffield United with their scouting.

== International ==
D'Jaffo was part of the Benin squad at the 2004 African Nations Cup.

== Honours ==
=== Player ===
Montpellier

- Coupe de la Ligue: 1991–92
