= Danny Swailes =

English footballer (born 1979)

Personal information
- Date of birth: 1 April 1979 (age 47)
- Place of birth: Bolton, England
- Height: 6 ft 3 in (1.91 m)
- Position: Defender

Senior career*
Years	Team	Apps	(Gls)
1996–2005	Bury	153	(13)
1999	→ Gainsborough Trinity (loan)	8	(0)
2005–2007	Macclesfield Town	94	(5)
2007–2010	Milton Keynes Dons	43	(4)
2009	→ Northampton Town (loan)	3	(0)
2010–2011	Stockport County	33	(0)
Total		334	(22)
- * Club domestic league appearances and goals

Daniel Swailes (born 1 April 1979) is an English former professional footballer who played as a defender.

== Career ==
Swailes moved to MK Dons from Macclesfield Town F.C. for an undisclosed fee of around £50,000 at the beginning of the 2007/08 season to join up with former Macclesfield manager, Paul Ince. He enjoyed an exceptional year as the Dons won promotion from League Two and the Football League Trophy, and was voted in the League Two Team of the Year at the end of the season.

On 18 January 2010 MK Dons announced that Swailes had been released and was to join Stockport County for the remaining six months of the season alongside fellow released player Ritchie Partridge. All four MK Dons players who had joined on 18 January, plus David Perkins who had joined from Colchester United on loan started the match on 19 January against Swindon Town.

At the end of the season, he signed a new deal with the club and was made club captain for the 2010/11 season. After a run of 34 matches for the club, he was injured in a game against Lincoln City on 23 October 2010 and faced the rest of the season out with injury.

In May 2011 he was informed that he would not be offered a contract by the club for the 2011/12 season.

== Honours ==
Milton Keynes Dons

- Football League Two: 2007–08
- Football League Trophy: 2007–08

Individual

- PFA Team of the Year: 2007–08 Football League Two

Sporting positions
Preceded by Michael Raynes	Stockport County captain 2010-2011	Succeeded by Nick Chadwick
