= Nick Daws =

English footballer and manager (born 1970)

Personal information
- Full name: Nicholas John Daws
- Date of birth: 15 March 1970 (age 56)
- Place of birth: Manchester, England
- Position: Midfielder

Team information
- Current team: Motherwell (head of recruitment)

Senior career*
Years	Team	Apps	(Gls)
1986–1988	Flixton		
1988–1992	Altrincham		
1992–2001	Bury	369	(16)
2001–2005	Rotherham United	72	(2)
2003	→ Grimsby Town (loan)	7	(0)
2004	→ Grimsby Town (loan)	10	(0)
Total		458	(18)

Managerial career
- 2016: Scunthorpe United (caretaker)
- 2018: Scunthorpe United (caretaker)
- 2018: Scunthorpe United
- * Club domestic league appearances and goals

Nicholas John Daws (born 15 March 1970) is an English football manager, coach and former professional footballer who is head of recruitment at Scottish Premier League side Motherwell.

As a player, he was a midfielder from 1986 until 2005 notably in the Football League for Bury, Rotherham United and Grimsby Town. Since retiring he has been a member of the coaching staff at Rotherham United, Barnsley, Queens Park Rangers, Scunthorpe United and AFC Wimbledon.

== Playing career ==
=== Altrincham ===
Daws was born in Manchester. He is arguably one of the more successful players to come from Altrincham, having made the transition from Non-League football to carve out a successful career in the Football League. He joined Altrincham from Flixton in October 1987, as a 17-year-old and impressed the management with his performances in the reserves. These performances meant that he made his first-team debut in the Cheshire Senior Cup semi-final defeat against Runcorn, which ended in a 1–4 defeat. Nicky ended his first season by scoring his first goal for the club in the last game of the season. Over the next two seasons he worked at establishing himself in the first team. For Altrincham he was ever-present during the 1990–91 season when Altrincham came so close to regaining the Conference National title.

=== Bury ===
In August 1992, Daws joined the professional ranks with a move to Bury Initially playing as a part-time professional he enjoyed a successful first season which included a man of the match performance against Manchester United in the English League Cup at Old Trafford. The season ended in disappointment, when ankle surgery forced him to miss the Play-off semi-final defeat to York City. Following an injury effected 93/94 campaign, Daws signed a full-time contract with the Shakers and became an integral part of the club's rise to the 2nd flight of English football. As one of the sides most consistent performers, the 1994–95 season ended with Play-off Final defeat to Chesterfield at Wembley Stadium. However success was to follow over the following two seasons with consecutive promotions that included a Division 2 Champions Medal and promotion to the 1st Division. Despite being one of the leagues minnows, Bury sustained their status for the next two years and it was during this time that Daws enhanced his reputation as an all action midfielder. Following relegation to Division 2, Daws was appointed Captain, but due to financial problems at Bury, they struggled to maintain a promotion challenge. On 26 February 2000 and following 223 consecutive appearances suspension ended Daws' run which encompassed two promotions over 4 1/2 years. The 2000–01 season proved to the last of his 9 years at Gigg Lane and in July, a move to the newly promoted Rotherham United gave Nick the chance to return to the Championship, signing a 3-year contract.

=== Rotherham United ===
Daws signed for The Millers on a free transfer at the start of the 2001–02 campaign and slotted straight into his usual position, playing under his new manager Ronnie Moore. Daws was to remain at United for the next four seasons for the club, and just over 70 league appearances in his three seasons with United, scoring twice. In September 2003 and January 2004, Daws was loaned out to Grimsby Town where he made a total of 18 appearances combining both spells. Daws returned from Blundell Park at the end of the 2003–04 season, but failed to save Grimsby from relegation. He remained with Rotherham for the 2004–05 season, but failed to make a single appearance. He would eventually retire in the summer of 2005, his final professional game was a 3–0 away defeat against Wrexham on 6 March 2004 whilst playing for Grimsby.

== Coaching career ==
Following his retirement from playing in 2005, Daws joined the coaching staff at Rotherham United. Having graduated from Manchester Metropolitan University with a BSc in Sport Science, he became fitness coach under Ronnie Moore, remaining in the same position under Mick Harford. The 2005–06 season saw him complete the prestigious FA Fitness Trainers Award. Following the appointment of Alan Knill, Daws became first team coach and remained at the club following Knill's departure to assist Mark Robins. Having gained his UEFA A Licence and following 2 successful campaigns, Daws joined Barnsley in the same role, when Rotherham manager Mark Robins was appointed the same position at Oakwell. In accordance to this happening, Robins took his entire coaching staff including Daws, to his new club and following two successful seasons in the Championship during which he completed the prestigious UEFA Pro Licence, Daws left Oakwell following Robins' resignation.

Following the 2011–12 season in which he scouted for a number of clubs in the Football League, Daws started the 2012–13 season in a new role as Professional Development Coach before taking on the role of Head of Coaching at Queens Park Rangers in September 2013. In October 2014, Daws left his role at QPR to join Scunthorpe United as first team coach.

On 18 January 2016, Robins and his assistant David Kelly were sacked by Scunthorpe United, Daws and Andy Dawson were put in temporary charge. On 22 February, and following a run of four wins from five games, Daws was named manager until the end of the season. Daws became Scunthorpe's assistant manager upon Graham Alexander's appointment as manager on 22 March 2016. On 25 May 2018 after a second spell as caretaker manager, Daws was appointed the permanent manager of Scunthorpe. He was sacked on 24 August, after four games of the 2018–19 season. On 24 October 2019 Daws was appointed as Glyn Hodges' assistant manager at League One AFC Wimbledon. On 30 January 2021, Daws and Hodges left their roles at AFC Wimbledon by mutual consent following a defeat to bitter rivals Milton Keynes Dons.

In June 2021, Daws was appointed head of recruitment at Motherwell.

== Managerial statistics ==
As of match played 22 August 2018

Managerial record by team and tenure
Team	Nat	From	To	Record								Ref
Team	Nat	From	To	G	W	D	L	GF	GA	GD	Win %	Ref
Scunthorpe United (caretaker)	(England)	18 January 2016	22 March 2016	11	5	5	1	15	7	+8	45.45	
Scunthorpe United (caretaker)	(England)	24 March 2018	25 May 2018	9	4	4	1	11	7	+4	44.44	
Scunthorpe United	(England)	25 May 2018	22 August 2018	5	1	1	3	4	12	−8	20.00	
Career Total				25	10	10	5	30	26	+4	40.00	—

== Honours ==
=== Player ===
Bury

- Football League Second Division: 1996–97
- Football League Third Division third-place promotion: 1995–96

Individual

- Bury Player of the Season: 1997–98
