= Kemajl Avdiu =

Swedish association football player

Personal information
- Date of birth: 22 December 1976 (age 48)
- Place of birth: Pristina, SFR Yugoslavia
- Position(s): Midfielder, Attacker

Senior career*
Years	Team	Apps	(Gls)
1997–1998	Esbjerg fB	12	(1)
1998–2000	Bury F.C.	27	(1)
1999	→ Partick Thistle F.C. (loan)	6	(1)
2000	→ Falkirk F.C. (loan)	1	(0)
2000	Finn Harps F.C.		
2001	Jonkopings Sodra IF	17	(7)
2001–2002	PAS Giannina F.C.		
2002–2007	Husqvarna FF		
2007–2009	FC Trollhättan		
2009–2013	Tenhults IF	44+	(0+)
2013	Hovslätts IK	20	(2)
2014	Tenhults IF	2	(0)
2015-20xx	IK Tord	7+	(0+)
2018	IF Haga	10	(1)
- * Club domestic league appearances and goals

Kemajl Avdiu (born 22 December 1976) is a Swedish former footballer.

== Career ==
=== England ===
Continuing his career at Bury from Esbjerg fB, Avdiu stayed with the Shakers until 2000, totaling 27 appearances and one goal.

Meanwhile, his family was trying to survive the Kosovo War (1998-1999), afraid to leave due to the threat of the Yugoslavian army. His family, including himself supported the NATO bombing of the country, but some of his relatives had not been accounted for, even though most fled to Albania. The then 22-year old, feeling fortunate to be safe, also expressed concern for his Austria-based friend who was thinking of enrolling in the Kosovo Liberation Army.

When the conflict was over, Avdiu hoped that his parents would retire in Kosovo.

=== Scotland ===
Loaned out to Partick Thistle from April to May 1999, the Swede put the Jags 2-0 up over East Fife on debut, but they came back 2-2. Despite this, he remained a fans' favorite. The day before, he volunteered to pack supplies to help people affected by the Kosovo War, expressing disquiet at the situation but also fortunate that there were many volunteers.
