= Andy Preece =

English footballer and manager (born 1967)

Personal information
- Full name: Andrew Paul Preece
- Date of birth: 27 March 1967 (age 59)
- Place of birth: Evesham, Worcestershire, England
- Height: 6 ft 1 in (1.85 m)
- Position: Forward

Team information
- Current team: Scunthorpe United (manager)

Senior career*
Years	Team	Apps	(Gls)
1986–1987	Worcester City		
1987–1988	Evesham United		
1988–1989	Northampton Town	1	(0)
1989–1990	Worcester City		
1990–1991	Wrexham	51	(7)
1991–1994	Stockport County	97	(42)
1994–1995	Crystal Palace	20	(4)
1995–1998	Blackpool	129	(35)
1998–2003	Bury	166	(27)
2003–2005	Carlisle United	40	(10)
2005–2007	Worcester City		
2010–2012	Northwich Victoria	1	(0)
Total		505	(125)

Managerial career
- 1999–2003: Bury
- 2005–2007: Worcester City
- 2009–2012: Northwich Victoria
- 2012–2016: Airbus UK Broughton
- 2017: Southport
- 2018: Pho Hien
- 2022–2026: Chorley
- 2026–: Scunthorpe United
- * Club domestic league appearances and goals

Andrew Paul Preece (born 27 March 1967) is an English football manager and former professional footballer who is the manager of National League club Scunthorpe United.

As a player, he was a forward who played over 500 games as a professional. He notably played in the Premier League for Crystal Palace, and in the Football League for Northampton Town, Wrexham, Stockport County, Blackpool and Bury. From 1999 onwards, Preece combined his playing duties with various coaching and management positions. He became player-manager of Bury in 1999, also going on to manage Worcester City, Northwich Victoria, Airbus UK and Southport.

== Playing career ==
=== Worcester City ===
Born in Evesham, Worcestershire, Preece began his career as a junior with Worcester City, making his debut as a substitute against Runcorn in the Conference aged 16. "It went backwards from there," he said in 2020. "I got glandular fever, they released me and I had to work my way back. I'd half given up on football. I played a lot of cricket, including going out to play in Australia for six months."

=== Evesham United and Northampton Town ===
He subsequently played briefly for Evesham United, then planned to return to Australia; however, someone at the club knew Graham Carr, manager at Northampton Town. The wheels were put in motion, and Preece joined the Cobblers in August 1988 on a non-contract basis. He made one appearance, as a substitute, before being released at the end of the following season.

=== Worcester City and Wrexham ===
In July 1989, he rejoined Worcester City briefly, and in March 1990 signed for Wrexham, for whom he scored his first known goals. In 51 league appearances, he scored seven times.

=== Stockport County ===
In December 1991, Preece joined Stockport County for a fee of £10,000, with Preece later saying he was unsure what County manager Danny Bergara had seen in him at Wrexham. At Edgeley Park, however, Preece enjoyed the most prolific period of his career, scoring 42 league goals in 97 league games, and forming a partnership with Kevin Francis. He impressed enough (including scoring the winning goal in a giant-killing feat against Queens Park Rangers in the FA Cup) that earned him a move to the Premier League.

=== Crystal Palace ===
He signed for Crystal Palace in June 1994 as a strike partner to Chris Armstrong, for a fee of £350,000. Preece credits Ray Wilkins, who joined Crystal Palace just prior to Preece's arrival, with Alan Smith's signing of the striker. Of his spell in the capital, Preece said: "It was the high point of my career. I scored four [goals] in a week. I scored the winner against Everton, two against Coventry City and the winner against Leicester, but ultimately I don't think I was good enough for that level."

=== Blackpool ===
Preece struggled to establish himself at Selhurst Park, in what was a struggling team (they were relegated at the end of the season), and returned to the North West to join Sam Allardyce's Blackpool, for a fee of £200,000, in July 1995. He turned down Burnley—having been sold on Owen Oyston's ambitious plans for Blackpool which ultimately did not materialise—and also missed a call from Barry Fry at Birmingham City while he was doing the paperwork on the Fylde coast.

Preece played in the forward line with the likes of Andy Watson, briefly, then Tony Ellis and James Quinn, and under Nigel Worthington in 1997–98 he was made captain for a period.

=== Bury ===
In July 1998, Preece joined Bury on a free transfer and went on to become player-manager.

=== Carlisle United ===
After leaving Bury in December 2003, Preece returned to playing with Carlisle United. Although Carlisle were eventually relegated to the Conference, Preece chose to remain with the Cumbrians for the following season.

=== Worcester City and Northwich Victoria ===
He returned to Worcester City, as player-manager, in 2005, where he remained for five years, before finishing his playing career with Northwich Victoria in 2012. He became the club's manager in 2009, remaining in the role for three years.

== Coaching and management career ==
=== Bury ===
In 1999, Preece was appointed join player-manager (with Steve Redmond) of Bury. David Nugent was signed by Preece after unsuccessful trials with Crewe Alexandra and Northampton Town, and went on to net Bury close to £1 million. Preece kept the team in League 1 for two seasons until the collapse of ITV Digital forced the sale of several players and administration for the club in 2001, resulting in their relegation to League Two. Preece's Bury reached the League Two play-offs in the 2002–03 season. Preece was released in December 2003 as Bury again tried to cut costs. Bury director Roger Barlow said that Preece's departure was for financial reasons and nothing to do with results on the pitch.

=== Worcester City ===
In February 2005, Preece joined Worcester City as player-manager and led the side to three consecutive top ten finishes in the Conference North then, in 2006, to the second round of the FA Cup. He left the club in October 2007.

=== Northwich Victoria ===
Preece became caretaker manager of Northwich Victoria on 25 February 2009.

In the 2009–10 season, he led Northwich to the second round of the FA Cup, a considerable achievement, and saw his side defeat former Premier League side Charlton Athletic in the process. Preece won manager of the month for April for his achievement of six successive wins. In the same season, he saw his side finish 12th in the Conference North in his first season in charge; however, financial issues saw his side relegated to the Northern Premier League Premier Division. In spite of relegation and financial uncertainty, he stayed at the club along with his assistant Andy Morrison.

On 21 August 2010, at the age of 43, he returned to football action for the first time in three years by coming off the substitutes' bench in the 90th minute, in a game which Northwich won 1–0 against Retford United on the opening day of the 2010–11 Northern Premier League Premier Division season. On 17 February 2011, he scored a seven-minute hat-trick as Northwich defeated Barnton in the Mid-Cheshire Senior Cup.

He resigned from the club on 16 January 2012, along with the rest of his management team, with the club reporting that he was expected to be appointed Director of Football at Welsh Premier League side Airbus UK Broughton the next day.

=== Airbus UK Broughton ===
As expected, on 17 January 2012, Preece was appointed to the Airbus UK role. He led the part-time side to runners-up in the Welsh Premier League in his first full season qualifying for the Europa League . This was the first time Airbus had finished in the top half of the table and the first time that a black English manager had led a team into Europe. In Europe, Airbus were only eliminated on away goals by Latvian side Venspils. The following season Airbus finished runners up again to full timers TNS. They qualified for the Europa league losing 3–2 on aggregate to Norwegian side FK Haugesund and Preece became the first Black English coach to lead a team into Europe in two successive seasons.

Preece left Airbus in August 2016 by mutual consent.

=== Southport ===
On 8 February 2017, he returned to the North West to become the new manager of National League side Southport, replacing Steve Burr, until the end of the season.

=== PVF ===
In November 2017, Preece was appointed as the head coach of the PVF Football Academy in Vietnam. He briefly coached PVF's first team Pho Hien in the 2018 Second Division before returning to the youth academy.

=== Chorley ===
After a spell coaching in Vietnam, Preece took up the role of Director of Football at Chorley, combining first-team coaching with leading the club's education programme. Preece was appointed manager of Chorley on 28 May 2022 following the departure of Jamie Vermiglio. In April 2023, he took charge of his 750th match as a manager.

In August 2024, Preece signed a long-term contract with Chorley.

Preece won his 400th game as a manager in May 2026.

=== Scunthorpe United ===
On 12 November 2026, Preece was appointed manager of National League club Scunthorpe United on an eighteen-month contract.

== Personal life ==
Preece's wife and daughter were only a couple of rows behind Crystal Palace supporter Matthew Simmons when the Eric Cantona kung-fu kick incident occurred at Selhurst Park in January 1995. After this incident, in 2020 Preece explained that he once jumped into a small group of fans during a Blackpool reserves game with Leicester City (which included Emile Heskey in their team) after one fan had racially abused him for the entire match. "After the game, I've run over and jumped in and confronted him, and then thought, 'Whoa, what am I doing?' I was pulled away, but it was too late — the FA got hold of it. It was front page of the Daily Sport. You know: Million-pound star does a Cantona." About forty Blackpool fans wrote to the FA in defence of Preece, saying the racial abuse he received was horrendous. The FA reprimanded him but took no further action. "I will always be grateful to those people who wrote in and supported me at that time," Preece added.

In 2021, Preece named the best XI he had played with. They were: Nigel Martyn (Crystal Palace), Lee Todd (Stockport County), Chris Coleman (Crystal Palace), Andy Morrison (Blackpool), Gareth Southgate (Crystal Palace), David Frain (Stockport County), Micky Mellon (Blackpool), Dean Gordon (Blackpool), Terry Dunfield (Bury), Chris Armstrong (Crystal Palace) and Tony Ellis (Blackpool). As for the best player he has played against, he chose Manchester United's Gary Pallister. "He was quick, he was strong, he was good in the air, he was good technically. You're just searching for a weakness. There was nothing you could do to get an edge on him."

Preece's best friend is Andy Morrison, who was his teammate at Blackpool and with whom he has worked in coaching and managerial roles thereafter.

== Honours ==
Stockport County

- Football League Trophy runner-up: 1992–93

Individual

- PFA Team of the Year: 1993–94 Second Division
