= 1996–97 Huddersfield Town A.F.C. season =

Huddersfield Town
1996–97 season
- Chairman: Malcolm Asquith
- Manager: Brian Horton
- Stadium: Kirklees Stadium
- Division One: 20th
- FA Cup: Third round (eliminated by Queens Park Rangers)
- League Cup: Third round (eliminated by Middlesbrough)
- Top goalscorer: League: Andy Payton (17); All: Andy Payton (19)
- Highest home attendance: 17,358 vs Manchester City (18 January 1997)
- Lowest home attendance: 5,094 vs Colchester United (19 September 1996)
- Biggest win: 3–0 vs Wrexham (20 August 1996); 3–0 vs Birmingham City (8 October 1996)
- Biggest defeat: 0–6 vs Swindon Town (16 October 19966)

The 1996–97 season for Huddersfield Town failed to carry on the good work of the previous and nearly saw Town relegated back to Division Two. Following the heavy spending on players in the closed season, much was expected of the Terriers in the 1996–97 season but, despite a bright start from new striker Marcus Stewart, Horton was unable to improve on the team's consistently poor away form that had ended the side's playoff bid the previous year. Long-term injuries to Stewart and Andy Morrison did little to help things and, with the previously strong home form becoming increasingly patchy, the Terriers struggled at the wrong end of the table. It was perhaps the least celebrated summer signing, Andy Payton, who notched an impressive tally of 20 goals and helped staved off the threat of relegation as the side scrambled to 20th, just 8 points and 2 places above the drop zone.

Injuries and illness forced Town to play 35 players during the season, then a record, which would actually be broken the following season. Brian Horton's job was seemingly under threat, although he wouldn't leave the McAlpine Stadium until October 1997.

== Squad at the start of the season ==
Note: Flags indicate national team as defined under FIFA eligibility rules; some limited exceptions apply. Players may hold more than one non-FIFA nationality.

No.	Pos.	Nation	Player
--	GK	ENG	Steve Francis
--	GK	WAL	Tony Norman
--	DF	ENG	Sam Collins
--	DF	SCO	Tom Cowan
--	DF	ENG	Jon Dyson
--	DF	ENG	Kevin Gray
--	DF	IRL	Thomas Heary
--	DF	WAL	Steve Jenkins
--	DF	SCO	Andy Morrison
--	DF	IRL	Robbie Ryan
--	DF	ENG	Lee Sinnott
--	MF	ENG	Simon Baldry
--	MF	ENG	Darren Bullock

No.	Pos.	Nation	Player
--	MF	ENG	Simon Collins
--	MF	ENG	Gary Crosby
--	MF	ENG	Paul Dalton
--	MF	ENG	Rob Edwards
--	MF	ENG	Lee Makel
--	MF	ENG	Paul Reid
--	FW	ENG	Iain Dunn
--	FW	GRN	Delroy Facey
--	FW	ENG	Ian Lawson
--	FW	ENG	Michael Midwood
--	FW	ENG	Andy Payton
--	FW	ENG	Rodney Rowe
--	FW	ENG	Marcus Stewart

== Review ==
Town made a promising start beating Charlton Athletic 2–0 in front of the highest home crowd for an opening day game for 24 years. This was followed up by wins over Ipswich Town, Oldham Athletic, Reading & Birmingham City, but then a spell of 9 games without a win, including a 6–0 defeat at Swindon Town, left manager Brian Horton in the lurch.

Form wasn't helped by the consistent injuries to top players such as Marcus Stewart and Andy Morrison, but Town slowly tried to recover, but their best run of the season came during the Christmas and New Year period when they went 5 games unbeaten, but they then went on a run of 1 win in 10, which propelled them into relegation territory.

By the end of the season, top scorer Andy Payton's goals were starting to dry up, but a win on the penultimate day of the season against already relegated Southend United made certain that Town would play Division 1 football the next season.

== Squad at the end of the season ==
Note: Flags indicate national team as defined under FIFA eligibility rules; some limited exceptions apply. Players may hold more than one non-FIFA nationality.

No.	Pos.	Nation	Player
--	GK	ENG	Steve Francis
--	GK	WAL	Tony Norman
--	DF	ENG	Sam Collins
--	DF	SCO	Tom Cowan
--	DF	ENG	Jon Dyson
--	DF	ENG	Darren Edmondson
--	DF	ENG	Kevin Gray
--	DF	IRL	Thomas Heary
--	DF	WAL	Steve Jenkins
--	DF	SCO	Andy Morrison
--	DF	IRL	Robbie Ryan
--	DF	ENG	Lee Sinnott
--	MF	ENG	Simon Baldry
--	MF	ENG	David Beresford
--	MF	WAL	Marcus Browning

No.	Pos.	Nation	Player
--	MF	ENG	Wayne Burnett
--	MF	ENG	Gary Crosby
--	MF	ENG	Paul Dalton
--	MF	ENG	Rob Edwards
--	MF	SCO	Lee Glover (on loan from Rotherham United)
--	MF	ENG	Jeremy Illingworth
--	MF	ENG	Lee Makel
--	FW	GRN	Delroy Facey
--	FW	ENG	Peter Kaye
--	FW	ENG	Ian Lawson
--	FW	ENG	Michael Midwood
--	FW	ENG	Andy Payton
--	FW	ENG	Rodney Rowe
--	FW	ENG	Marcus Stewart

== Results ==
=== Division One ===
Date	Opponents	Home/ Away	Result F – A	Scorers	Attendance	Position
17 August 1996	Charlton Athletic	H	2–0	Bullock [15], Morrison [85]	11,858	3rd
25 August 1996	Barnsley	A	1–3	Cowan [44]	9,787	12th
31 August 1996	Crystal Palace	H	1–1	Payton [33]	11,166	16th
7 September 1996	Ipswich Town	A	3–1	Payton [47, 67], Stewart [51]	10,661	7th
10 September 1996	Tranmere Rovers	H	0–1		10,181	11th
13 September 1996	Oldham Athletic	H	3–2	Stewart [15, 85], Gray [90]	10,296	7th
22 September 1996	Stoke City	A	2–3	Worthington [7 (og)], Stewart [36]	9,147	14th
28 September 1996	Reading	H	1–0	Payton [34]	10,330	11th
8 October 1996	Birmingham City	H	3–0	Edwards [17], Stewart [23], Dalton [45]	10,904	7th
12 October 1996	West Bromwich Albion	A	1–1	Cowan [51]	14,960	6th
16 October 1996	Swindon Town	A	0–6		7,724	10th
19 October 1996	Southend United	H	0–0		9,578	10th
26 October 1996	Port Vale	H	0–1		11,017	12th
30 October 1996	Wolverhampton Wanderers	A	0–0		22,376	13th
2 November 1996	Bolton Wanderers	A	0–2		15,865	15th
8 November 1996	Bradford City	H	3–3	Dalton [42], Lawson [45], Crosby [48]	14,126	13th
16 November 1996	Oxford United	A	0–1		7,460	15th
19 November 1996	Manchester City	A	0–0		23,314	17th
23 November 1996	Grimsby Town	H	2–0	Payton [24, 27]	10,590	13th
30 November 1996	Port Vale	A	0–0		6,026	15th
3 December 1996	Sheffield United	A	1–3	Payton [14]	14,700	15th
7 December 1996	Norwich City	H	2–0	Payton [34, 56]	10,749	13th
14 December 1996	Portsmouth	A	1–3	Makel [51]	6,954	17th
21 December 1996	Queens Park Rangers	H	1–2	Payton [51]	10,718	18th
26 December 1996	Tranmere Rovers	A	1–1	Payton [21]	10,134	18th
28 December 1996	Ipswich Town	H	2–0	Lawson [50], Payton [85]	11,467	18th
1 January 1997	Stoke City	H	2–1	Makel [6], Edwards [63]	11,919	12th
18 January 1997	Manchester City	H	1–1	Lawson [78]	17,358	13th
25 January 1997	Oldham Athletic	A	2–1	Payton [71, 83]	8,566	13th
28 January 1997	Reading	A	1–4	Payton [9]	5,710	13th
1 February 1997	Bradford City	A	1–1	Crosby [1]	17,373	14th
8 February 1997	Wolverhampton Wanderers	H	0–2		15,267	15th
15 February 1997	Grimsby Town	A	2–2	Stewart [44], Edwards [48]	6,197	16th
22 February 1997	Bolton Wanderers	H	1–2	Cowan [16]	15,861	16th
1 March 1997	Norwich City	A	0–2		13,001	17th
4 March 1997	Oxford United	H	1–0	Makel [27]	11,276	14th
8 March 1997	Queens Park Rangers	A	0–2		9,789	18th
15 March 1997	Portsmouth	H	1–3	Stewart [35]	10,512	20th
22 March 1997	Barnsley	H	0–0		14,754	20th
31 March 1997	Sheffield United	H	2–1	Dalton [1], Cowan [18]	14,551	19th
5 April 1997	Crystal Palace	A	1–1	Payton [61]	13,541	20th
9 April 1997	Charlton Athletic	A	1–2	Dalton [77]	11,032	20th
12 April 1997	Birmingham City	A	0–1		14,394	20th
19 April 1997	West Bromwich Albion	H	0–0		12,748	20th
26 April 1997	Southend United	A	2–1	Payton [23], Beresford [67]	4,762	20th
4 May 1997	Swindon Town	H	0–0		11,506	20th

=== FA Cup ===
Date	Round	Opponents	Home/ Away	Result F – A	Scorers	Attendance
4 January 1997	Round 3	Queens Park Rangers	A	1–1	Crosby [64]	11,776
14 January 1997	Round 3 replay	Queens Park Rangers	H	1–2	Edwards [7]	11,814

=== League Cup ===
Date	Round	Opponents	Home/ Away	Result F – A	Scorers	Attendance
20 August 1996	Round 1 1st Leg	Wrexham	H	3–0	Stewart [12, 25, 53]	5,178
3 September 1996	Round 1 2nd Leg	Wrexham	A	2–1	Payton [10], Edwards [55]	1,776: Huddersfield won 5–1 on aggregate
17 September 1996	Round 2 1st Leg	Colchester United	H	1–1	Cowan [45]	5,094
24 September 1996	Round 2 2nd Leg	Colchester United	A	2 – 0 (aet: 90 mins: 0 – 0)	Stewart [98], Simon Collins [110]	4,095: Huddersfield won 3–1 on aggregate
23 October 1996	Round 3	Middlesbrough	A	1–5	Payton [87]	26,615

== Appearances and goals ==
Name	Nationality	Position	League		FA Cup		League Cup		Total	
Name	Nationality	Position	Apps	Goals	Apps	Goals	Apps	Goals	Apps	Goals
Simon Baldry	England	MF	2 (5)	0	0	0	0	0	2 (5)	0
David Beresford	England	MF	6	1	0	0	0	0	6	1
Marcus Browning	Wales	MF	13	0	0	0	0	0	13	0
Darren Bullock	England	MF	26 (1)	1	2	0	4	0	32 (1)	1
Wayne Burnett	England	MF	33 (2)	0	1 (1)	0	3	0	37 (3)	0
Sam Collins	England	DF	10 (6)	0	0 (2)	0	2 (2)	0	12 (10)	0
Simon Collins	England	DF	3 (1)	0	0	0	1 (1)	1	4 (2)	1
Tom Cowan	Scotland	DF	42	4	1	0	5	1	48	5
Gary Crosby	England	MF	19 (5)	2	2	1	0	0	21 (5)	3
Paul Dalton	England	MF	17 (12)	4	0	0	1 (2)	0	18 (14)	4
Simon Davies	Wales	MF	3	0	0	0	0	0	3	0
Iain Dunn	England	FW	1 (4)	0	0	0	0	0	1 (4)	0
Jon Dyson	England	DF	18 (5)	0	2	0	0 (2)	0	20 (7)	0
Darren Edmondson	England	DF	10	0	0	0	0	0	10	0
Rob Edwards	England	MF	24 (9)	3	2	1	4 (1)	1	30 (10)	5
Delroy Facey	Grenada	FW	1 (2)	0	0	0	0	0	1 (2)	0
Steve Francis	England	GK	42	0	1	0	5	0	48	0
Lee Glover	England	MF	11	0	0	0	0	0	11	0
Kevin Gray	England	DF	36 (3)	1	0	0	4	0	40 (3)	1
Thomas Heary	Republic of Ireland	DF	2 (3)	0	1	0	0	0	3 (3)	0
Jeremy Illingworth	England	MF	2 (1)	0	0	0	0	0	2 (1)	0
Steve Jenkins	Wales	DF	33	0	2	0	5	0	40	0
Peter Kaye	England	FW	0 (1)	0	0	0	0	0	0 (1)	0
Ian Lawson	England	FW	8 (10)	3	1 (1)	0	1 (3)	0	10 (14)	3
Lee Makel	England	MF	19	3	2	0	3	0	24	3
Andy Morrison	Scotland	DF	9 (1)	1	0	0	2	0	11 (1)	1
Tony Norman	Wales	GK	4	0	1	0	0	0	5	0
Andy Payton	England	FW	38	17	2	0	5	2	45	19
Paul Reid	England	MF	20 (2)	0	1 (1)	0	4	0	25 (3)	0
Rodney Rowe	England	FW	1 (6)	0	0	0	0 (1)	0	1 (7)	0
Robbie Ryan	Republic of Ireland	DF	2 (3)	0	0	0	0	0	2 (3)	0
Lee Sinnott	England	DF	29 (1)	0	0	0	2	0	31 (1)	0
Marcus Stewart	England	FW	19 (1)	7	1	0	4	4	24 (1)	11
Paul Tisdale	Malta	DF	1 (1)	0	0	0	0	0	1 (1)	0
Mike Williams	England	MF	2	0	0	0	0	0	2	0
