= 1997–98 Huddersfield Town A.F.C. season =

Huddersfield Town
1997–98 season
- Chairman: Malcolm Asquith
- Manager: Brian Horton (until 5 October 1997); Peter Jackson (from 8 October 1997)
- Stadium: Kirklees Stadium
- Division One: 16th
- FA Cup: Fourth round (eliminated by Wimbledon)
- League Cup: Second round (eliminated by West Ham United)
- Top goalscorer: League: Marcus Stewart (15); All: Marcus Stewart (16)
- Highest home attendance: 18,186 vs Middlesbrough (26 December 1997)
- Lowest home attendance: 8,525 vs West Ham United (16 September 1997)
- Biggest win: 5–1 vs Oxford United (10 January 1998)
- Biggest defeat: 0–5 vs Norwich City (13 April 1998)

The 1997–98 season was a disaster turned into a success for Huddersfield Town. After a closed season of little activity in the transfer market, Town started the 1997–98 season disastrously and, after some questionable signings and tactical decisions, Brian Horton was sacked in October 1997 as the club lay at the foot of Division One. Thirty-six-year-old former Huddersfield, Bradford City and Newcastle United central defender Peter Jackson was drafted in as Horton's replacement in October and turned the club's fortunes around drastically. He immediately installed the experienced former Wales manager Terry Yorath as his assistant. Given a generous transfer budget by the board, Jackson captured experienced pros such as former Welsh internationals Barry Horne and David Phillips in addition to powerful local-born striker Wayne Allison from Division 1 rivals Swindon Town. He also managed to rejuvenate players such as Marcus Stewart and, particularly, the previously inconsistent Paul Dalton to the extent that the club finished a respectable 16th in the final table.

== Squad at the start of the season ==
Note: Flags indicate national team as defined under FIFA eligibility rules; some limited exceptions apply. Players may hold more than one non-FIFA nationality.

No.	Pos.	Nation	Player
--	GK	ENG	Steve Francis
--	GK	IRL	Derek O'Connor
--	DF	ENG	Sam Collins
--	DF	SCO	Tom Cowan
--	DF	ENG	Jon Dyson
--	DF	ENG	Darren Edmondson
--	DF	ENG	Rob Edwards
--	DF	ENG	Kevin Gray
--	DF	IRL	Thomas Heary
--	DF	ENG	Sean Hessey
--	DF	WAL	Steve Jenkins
--	DF	SCO	Andy Morrison
--	DF	IRL	Robbie Ryan

No.	Pos.	Nation	Player
--	MF	ENG	Simon Baldry
--	MF	ENG	David Beresford
--	MF	WAL	Marcus Browning
--	MF	ENG	Wayne Burnett
--	MF	ENG	Paul Dalton
--	MF	ENG	Alex Dyer
--	MF	ENG	Lee Makel
--	FW	GRN	Delroy Facey
--	FW	ENG	Ian Lawson
--	FW	ENG	Michael Midwood
--	FW	ENG	Andy Payton
--	FW	ENG	Marcus Stewart

== Review ==
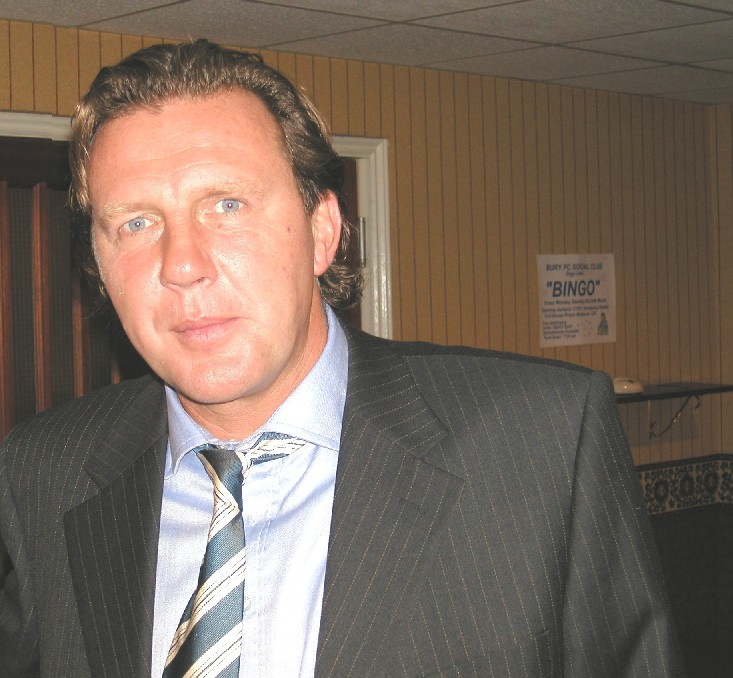
Peter Jackson

The start of the season was the worst in the entire history of Huddersfield Town. Town won none of their first 14 league games. In fact the only games they won were two League Cup ties against Bradford City and more surprisingly Premier League side West Ham United (they eventually lost 3–1 on aggregate against the Hammers) Manager Brian Horton dropped popular keeper Steve Francis for the televised game against Nottingham Forest. Town lost the game 2–0 and two days later Horton was shown the door.

Popular ex-player Peter Jackson was hired three days later, but Town lost four of Jackson's first 5 games and drew the other, conceding 14 goals and only scoring three. Then amazingly, Town beat Stoke City 3–1 on 1 November and the fightback began. Jackson brought in experienced players such as Barry Horne, Wayne Allison, David Phillips and Lee Richardson, as well as loan signing Steve Harper from Newcastle United. They then managed to beat Manchester City 1–0 in a televised game at Maine Road in November.

After another severe dip in form during February and March, in which Town lost five out of six, some thought that survival was a bridge too far for Jackson's side. But a six-match unbeaten run near the end of the season, followed by a win against West Bromwich Albion, confirmed Town's safety. They finished in 16th position and used a record 37 players during that season, including four goalkeepers. The season will always be remembered and referred to as "The Great Escape".

== Squad at the end of the season ==
Note: Flags indicate national team as defined under FIFA eligibility rules; some limited exceptions apply. Players may hold more than one non-FIFA nationality.

No.	Pos.	Nation	Player
--	GK	ENG	Steve Francis
--	GK	ENG	Steve Harper (on loan from Newcastle United)
--	DF	ENG	Sam Collins
--	DF	SCO	Tom Cowan
--	DF	ENG	Jon Dyson
--	DF	ENG	Darren Edmondson
--	DF	ENG	Rob Edwards
--	DF	ENG	Kevin Gray
--	DF	IRL	Thomas Heary
--	DF	ENG	Sean Hessey
--	DF	WAL	Steve Jenkins
--	DF	SCO	Andy Morrison
--	MF	ENG	Simon Baldry

No.	Pos.	Nation	Player
--	MF	ENG	David Beresford
--	MF	WAL	Marcus Browning
--	MF	ENG	Paul Dalton
--	MF	WAL	Barry Horne
--	MF	ENG	Chris Hurst
--	MF	SCO	Grant Johnson
--	MF	WAL	David Phillips
--	MF	ENG	Lee Richardson
--	FW	ENG	Wayne Allison
--	FW	ENG	Paul Barnes
--	FW	GRN	Delroy Facey
--	FW	ENG	Ian Lawson
--	FW	ENG	Marcus Stewart

== Results ==
=== Division One ===
Date	Opponents	Home/ Away	Result F – A	Scorers	Attendance	Position
9 August 1997	Oxford United	A	0–2		7,085	21st
23 August 1997	Swindon Town	A	1–1	Stewart [43]	7,683	22nd
30 August 1997	Sheffield United	H	0–0		14,268	23rd
2 September 1997	Bradford City	H	1–2	Stewart [75]	13,159	23rd
9 September 1997	Birmingham City	H	0–1		9,477	23rd
13 September 1997	Ipswich Town	H	2–2	Jenkins [41], Dyer [88]	9,313	24th
20 September 1997	Stockport County	A	0–3		6,995	24th
27 September 1997	Wolverhampton Wanderers	A	1–1	Stewart [32]	21,723	24th
3 October 1997	Nottingham Forest	H	0–2		11,258	24th
14 October 1997	Charlton Athletic	H	0–3		9,596	24th
18 October 1997	Sunderland	A	1–3	Dalton [45]	24,782	24th
21 October 1997	Port Vale	A	1–4	Stewart [86]	5,244	24th
25 October 1997	Portsmouth	H	1–1	Dalton [80]	8,985	24th
28 October 1997	Middlesbrough	A	0–3		29,965	24th
1 November 1997	Stoke City	H	3–1	Richardson [46], Stewart [80], Dalton [90]	10,916	24th
4 November 1997	Tranmere Rovers	A	0–1		5,127	24th
7 November 1997	Manchester City	A	1–0	Edwards [76]	24,425	24th
15 November 1997	Reading	H	1–0	Dalton [73]	12,617	24th
22 November 1997	Queens Park Rangers	A	1–2	Morrison [89]	16,066	24th
29 November 1997	Bury	H	2–0	Dalton [7, 83]	11,929	23rd
6 December 1997	Crewe Alexandra	A	5–2	Stewart [24, 70], Dalton [40, 83 (pen)], Allison [89]	4,861	22nd
13 December 1997	Norwich City	H	1–3	Stewart [58]	11,436	24th
20 December 1997	West Bromwich Albion	A	2–0	Dalton [51, 72]	14,619	20th
26 December 1997	Middlesbrough	H	0–1		18,186	23rd
28 December 1997	Bradford City	A	1–1	Dalton [34]	17,842	22nd
10 January 1998	Oxford United	H	5–1	Gray [21 (og)], Phillips [30], Stewart [41, 55], Allison [59]	10,378	19th
17 January 1998	Birmingham City	A	0–0		17,850	19th
27 January 1998	Sheffield United	A	1–1	Dalton [24]	16,535	19th
31 January 1998	Swindon Town	H	0–0		10,028	19th
7 February 1998	Stockport County	H	1–0	Allison [53]	11,121	18th
14 February 1998	Ipswich Town	A	1–5	Stewart [37]	10,509	19th
17 February 1998	Nottingham Forest	A	0–3		18,231	20th
21 February 1998	Wolverhampton Wanderers	H	1–0	Dyson [90]	12,633	18th
24 February 1998	Sunderland	H	2–3	Allison [51], Phillips [57]	14,615	19th
28 February 1998	Charlton Athletic	A	0–1		12,908	22nd
3 March 1998	Manchester City	H	1–3	Dalton [38 (pen)]	15,694	22nd
7 March 1998	Stoke City	A	2–1	Barnes [15], Stewart [18]	12,594	21st
14 March 1998	Tranmere Rovers	H	3–0	Allison [10], Stewart [67], Hill [77 (og)]	10,844	17th
21 March 1998	Reading	A	2–0	Stewart [73, 88]	8,593	15th
28 March 1998	Queens Park Rangers	H	1–1	Gray [59]	13,681	15th
4 April 1998	Bury	A	2–2	Richardson [34 (pen), 71]	8,042	15th
11 April 1998	Crewe Alexandra	H	2–0	Allison [42], Johnson [44]	11,263	14th
13 April 1998	Norwich City	A	0–5		16,550	16th
18 April 1998	West Bromwich Albion	H	1–0	Baldry [12]	11,704	13th
25 April 1998	Portsmouth	A	0–3		14,013	14th
3 May 1998	Port Vale	H	0–4		15,610	16th

=== FA Cup ===
Date	Round	Opponents	Home/ Away	Result F – A	Scorers	Attendance
13 January 1998	Round 3	Bournemouth	A	1–0	Stewart [15]	7,385
24 January 1998	Round 4	Wimbledon	H	0–1		14,533

=== League Cup ===
Date	Round	Opponents	Home/ Away	Result F – A	Scorers	Attendance
12 August 1997	Round 1 1st Leg	Bradford City	H	2–1	Payton [6], Dreyer [45 (og)]	8,735
26 August 1997	Round 1 2nd Leg	Bradford City	A	1–1	Burnett [77]	8,065: Huddersfield won 3–2 on aggregate
16 September 1997	Round 2 1st Leg	West Ham United	H	1–0	Dyer [75]	8,525
29 September 1997	Round 2 2nd Leg	West Ham United	A	0–3		16,137: Huddersfield lost 3–1 on aggregate

== Appearances and goals ==
Name	Nationality	Position	League		FA Cup		League Cup		Total	
Name	Nationality	Position	Apps	Goals	Apps	Goals	Apps	Goals	Apps	Goals
Wayne Allison	England	FW	27	6	2	0	0	0	29	6
Simon Baldry	England	MF	8 (3)	1	0	0	1 (1)	0	9 (4)	1
Paul Barnes	England	FW	11 (4)	1	0	0	0	0	11 (4)	1
Vince Bartram	England	GK	12	0	0	0	0	0	12	0
David Beresford	England	MF	5 (3)	0	0	0	1	0	6 (3)	0
Marcus Browning	Wales	MF	10 (4)	0	0	0	1	0	11 (4)	0
Wayne Burnett	England	MF	11 (4)	0	0	0	3 (1)	1	14 (5)	1
Sam Collins	England	DF	9 (1)	0	0	0	1	0	10 (1)	0
Paul Dalton	England	MF	26 (5)	13	2	0	1	0	29 (5)	13
Alex Dyer	England	MF	8 (4)	1	0	0	3	1	11 (4)	2
Jon Dyson	England	DF	35 (1)	1	2	0	3	0	40 (1)	1
Darren Edmondson	England	DF	15 (4)	0	0 (1)	0	2	0	17 (5)	0
Rob Edwards	England	MF	26 (12)	1	0 (1)	0	2	0	28 (13)	1
Delroy Facey	Grenada	FW	1 (2)	0	0	0	0	0	1 (2)	0
Steve Francis	England	GK	9	0	0	0	4	0	13	0
Kevin Gray	England	DF	34 (1)	1	2	0	2	0	38 (1)	1
Steve Harper	England	GK	24	0	2	0	0	0	26	0
Thomas Heary	Republic of Ireland	DF	2 (1)	0	0	0	0 (1)	0	2 (2)	0
Sean Hessey	England	DF	0 (1)	0	0	0	0	0	0 (1)	0
Barry Horne	Wales	MF	29 (1)	0	2	0	0	0	31 (1)	0
Chris Hurst	England	MF	1 (2)	0	0	0	0 (1)	0	1 (3)	0
Steve Jenkins	Wales	DF	28 (1)	1	2	0	4	0	34 (1)	1
Grant Johnson	Scotland	MF	28 (1)	1	2	0	0	0	30 (1)	1
Ian Lawson	England	FW	3 (15)	0	0	0	0 (1)	0	3 (16)	0
Lee Makel	England	MF	10 (3)	0	0 (1)	0	4	0	14 (4)	0
Lee Martin	England	DF	2 (1)	0	0	0	1	0	3 (1)	0
Michael Midwood	England	FW	0 (1)	0	0	0	0	0	0 (1)	0
Andy Morrison	Scotland	DF	22 (1)	1	2	0	3	0	27 (1)	1
Martin Nielsen	Denmark	MF	0 (3)	0	0	0	0	0	0 (3)	0
Derek O'Connor	Republic of Ireland	GK	1	0	0	0	0 (1)	0	1 (1)	0
Andy Payton	England	FW	4 (1)	0	0	0	2	1	6 (1)	1
David Phillips	Wales	MF	29	2	2	0	0	0	31	2
Lee Richardson	England	MF	16 (5)	3	0 (2)	0	0	0	16 (7)	3
Robbie Ryan	Republic of Ireland	DF	10	0	0	0	2	0	12	0
Alex Smith	England	DF	4 (2)	0	0	0	0	0	4 (2)	0
Marcus Stewart	England	FW	38 (3)	15	2	1	4	0	44 (3)	16
Julian Watts	England	DF	8	0	0	0	0	0	8	0
