= 1997–98 Rochdale A.F.C. season =

English football club season

Rochdale
1997–98 season
- Manager: Graham Barrow
- League Division Three: 18th
- FA Cup: 1st Round
- League Cup: 1st Round
- Top goalscorer: League: Robbie Painter; All: Robbie Painter

The 1997–98 season was Rochdale A.F.C.'s 91st in existence and their 24th consecutive in the fourth tier of the English football league, named at the time as the Football League Third Division.

== Statistics ==
No.	Pos	Nat	Player	Total		Division 3		F.A. Cup		League Cup		League Trophy	
No.	Pos	Nat	Player	Apps	Goals	Apps	Goals	Apps	Goals	Apps	Goals	Apps	Goals
	GK	(England) ENG	Lance Key	21	0	19+0	0	0+0	0	2+0	0	0+0	0
	DF	(England) ENG	Andy Fensome	47	0	42+0	0	1+0	0	2+0	0	2+0	0
	DF	(England) ENG	Andy Barlow	40	0	35+3	0	1+0	0	1+0	0	0+0	0
	DF	(England) ENG	Keith Hill	40	2	36+1	2	1+0	0	2+0	0	0+0	0
	MF	(England) ENG	Andy Farrell	45	5	40+0	5	1+0	0	2+0	0	2+0	0
	MF	(England) ENG	Andy Gouck	43	5	36+2	5	1+0	0	2+0	0	1+1	0
	DF	(England) ENG	Mark Bailey	37	0	24+9	0	0+0	0	2+0	0	2+0	0
	FW	(England) ENG	Robbie Painter	50	17	45+0	16	1+0	0	2+0	1	2+0	0
	FW	(England) ENG	Mark Leonard	37	2	33+0	2	1+0	0	2+0	0	1+0	0
	MF	(England) ENG	Alex Russell	34	5	26+5	4	1+0	0	1+0	1	0+1	0
	MF	(England) ENG	Mark Stuart	50	7	30+15	6	1+0	0	2+0	0	1+1	1
	FW	(England) ENG	Mark Carter	13	2	7+4	2	0+0	0	1+1	0	0+0	0
	DF	(England) ENG	David Bayliss	32	2	23+6	2	0+0	0	1+0	0	2+0	0
	DF	(England) ENG	Andy Scott	3	0	1+2	0	0+0	0	0+0	0	0+0	0
	FW	(England) ENG	Craig Smith	4	0	1+2	0	0+0	0	0+1	0	0+0	0
	MF	(Scotland) SCO	Ian Bryson	18	1	12+3	1	1+0	0	0+0	0	2+0	0
	FW	(England) ENG	Graham Lancashire	28	9	20+7	9	0+0	0	0+0	0	1+0	0
	GK	(Wales) WAL	Neil Edwards	29	0	27+0	0	1+0	0	0+0	0	1+0	0
	FW	(England) ENG	Glen Robson	7	0	0+7	0	0+0	0	0+0	0	0+0	0
	DF	(Republic of Ireland) IRL	John Pender	17	0	14+0	0	0+1	0	0+0	0	2+0	0
	DF	(England) ENG	Adam Reed	12	1	10+0	0	0+0	0	0+0	0	2+0	1
	MF	(England) ENG	Graeme Atkinson	6	0	5+1	0	0+0	0	0+0	0	0+0	0
	MF	(England) ENG	Gary Jones	17	2	17+0	2	0+0	0	0+0	0	0+0	0
	MF	(England) ENG	Paul Carden	7	0	3+4	0	0+0	0	0+0	0	0+0	0
	GK	(England) ENG	Stephen Bywater	1	0	0+0	0	0+0	0	0+0	0	1+0	0

== Final League Table ==
Pos	Team	Pld	W	D	L	GF	GA	GD	Pts
16	Cambridge United	46	14	18	14	63	57	+6	60
17	Hartlepool United	46	12	23	11	61	53	+8	59
18	Rochdale	46	17	7	22	56	55	+1	58
19	Darlington	46	14	12	20	56	72	−16	54
20	Swansea City	46	13	11	22	49	62	−13	50

Rules for classification: In the Football League goals scored (GF) takes precedence over goal difference (GD).

== Competitions ==
=== Football League Third Division ===
Win Draw Loss

9 August 1997 1	Notts County	2–1	Rochdale	Nottingham
	Robson 45'; Redmile 89'; Hendon (yellow card); Finnan (yellow card)	Report	Painter	Stadium: Meadow Lane; Attendance: 4173; Referee: MD Messias

16 August 1997 2	Rochdale	2–0	Mansfield Town	Rochdale
	Russell 11'; Painter 22'; Hill (yellow card)	Report	Whitehall (yellow card)	Stadium: Spotland Stadium; Attendance: 2133; Referee: A Bates

23 August 1997 3	Leyton Orient	2–0	Rochdale	London
	Smith 1' (pen.), 85' (pen.); Naylor (yellow card); Joseph (yellow card); Clark (yellow card); Griffiths (yellow card)	Report	Hill (red card) 1'; Farrell (yellow card); Gouck (yellow card); Carter (yellow card); Leonard (yellow card) (yellow-red card) 88'	Stadium: Brisbane Road; Attendance: 3463; Referee: R Styles

30 August 1997 4	Rochdale	1–2	Peterborough United	Rochdale
	Painter 19'; Bailey (yellow card)	Report	Carruthers 13'; Farrell 56'; Cleaver (yellow card)	Stadium: Spotland Stadium; Attendance: 2104; Referee: ML Dean

2 September 1997 5	Rochdale	2–0	Macclesfield Town	Rochdale
	Carter 47'; Hill 73' (yellow card); Farrell (yellow card); Leonard (yellow card)	Report		Stadium: Spotland Stadium; Attendance: 2197; Referee: D Laws

9 September 1997 6	Shrewsbury Town	1–0	Rochdale	Shrewsbury
	Evans 78' (pen.); Scott (yellow card)	Report	Farrell (yellow card)	Stadium: Gay Meadow; Attendance: 2410; Referee: CJ Foy

13 September 1997 7	Cardiff City	2–1	Rochdale	Cardiff
	White 40'; Eckhardt 87'	Report	Carter 10' (pen.); Hill (yellow card)	Stadium: Ninian Park; Attendance: 4306; Referee: MJ Jones

20 September 1997 8	Rochdale	2–1	Hull City	Rochdale
	Hill 13'; Stuart 78'	Report	Lowthorpe 38'	Stadium: Spotland Stadium; Attendance: 2085; Referee: MS Pike

27 September 1997 9	Brighton & Hove Albion	2–1	Rochdale	Gillingham
	Morris 62'; Tuck 73'; Mayo (yellow card); Baird (yellow card)	Report	Bayliss 33'	Stadium: Priestfield Stadium; Attendance: 1544; Referee: SW Mathieson

4 October 1997 10	Rochdale	2–0	Scunthorpe United	Rochdale
	Russell 4'; Painter 58' (pen.); Bailey (yellow card); Leonard (yellow card)	Report	Walsh (red card) 58'; Housham (yellow card); Laws (yellow card)	Stadium: Spotland Stadium; Attendance: 2087; Referee: AR Hall

11 October 1997 11	Rochdale	5–0	Darlington	Rochdale
	Painter 4' (pen.), 71'; Lancashire 10', 89'; Russell 86'; Bailey (yellow card); Hill (yellow card)	Report	Crosby (yellow card); Brydon (yellow card)	Stadium: Spotland Stadium; Attendance: 2134; Referee: T Jones

18 October 1997 12	Cambridge United	1–1	Rochdale	Cambridge
	Finney 16'; Butler (yellow card)	Report	Gouck 64' (yellow card); Farrell (yellow card)	Stadium: Abbey Stadium; Attendance: 2703; Referee: D Orr

21 October 1997 13	Barnet	3–1	Rochdale	Chipping Barnet
	Harle 39'; Heald 48'; Samuels 84'	Report	Leonard 60'	Stadium: Underhill Stadium; Attendance: 1310; Referee: B Coddington

25 October 1997 14	Rochdale	0–1	Rotherham United	Rochdale
	Farrell (yellow card)	Report	Garner 5'; Knill (yellow card)	Stadium: Spotland Stadium; Attendance: 2267; Referee: G Laws

1 November 1997 15	Chester City	4–0	Rochdale	Chester
	McDonald 10'; Bennett 69'; Rimmer 72', 79'; Priest (yellow card)	Report	Barlow (yellow card)	Stadium: Deva Stadium; Attendance: 2431; Referee: M Fletcher

4 November 1997 16	Rochdale	0–0	Lincoln City	Rochdale
	Fensome (yellow card)	Report		Stadium: Spotland Stadium; Attendance: 1537; Referee: FG Stretton

8 November 1997 17	Rochdale	2–1	Colchester United	Rochdale
	Stuart 44'; Painter 63' (pen.); Farrell (yellow card)	Report	Duguid 60'; Greene (yellow card); Adcock (yellow card)	Stadium: Spotland Stadium; Attendance: 1702; Referee: T Heilbron

18 November 1997 18	Hartlepool United	2–0	Rochdale	Hartlepool
	Beech 36'; Halliday 67'	Report	Edwards (yellow card); Hill (yellow card); Bryson (yellow card)	Stadium: Victoria Park; Attendance: 1666; Referee: KM Lynch

22 November 1997 19	Doncaster Rovers	0–3	Rochdale	Doncaster
	Hilton (yellow card)	Report	Stuart 42', 56'; Lancashire 69'; Bayliss (yellow card); Painter (yellow card); Pender (yellow card)	Stadium: Belle Vue; Attendance: 1503; Referee: PS Danson

29 November 1997 20	Rochdale	0–1	Torquay United	Rochdale
	Hill (yellow card); Stuart (yellow card)	Report	Jack 51'; Bedeau (yellow card)	Stadium: Spotland Stadium; Attendance: 1729; Referee: JA Kirkby

6 December 1997 21	Scarborough	1–0	Rochdale	Scarborough
	Campbell 44'; Atkin (yellow card)	Report	Bayliss (yellow card)	Stadium: Athletic Ground; Attendance: 1705; Referee: D Laws

13 December 1997 22	Rochdale	3–0	Swansea City	Rochdale
	Painter 26', 37'; Leonard 67'	Report	Walker (yellow card); Ampadu (yellow card) (yellow-red card) 81'	Stadium: Spotland Stadium; Attendance: 1482; Referee: MD Messias

20 December 1997 23	Exeter City	3–0	Rochdale	Exeter
	Tisdale 30'; Devlin 38'; Rowbotham 44' (pen.) (yellow card)	Report	Bailey (yellow card); Reed (yellow card); Pender (yellow card)	Stadium: St James Park; Attendance: 3378; Referee: DR Crick

26 December 1997 24	Rochdale	3–1	Shrewsbury Town	Rochdale
	Lancashire 40'; Painter 71'; Bryson 90'; Fensome (yellow card); Farrell (yellow card)	Report	Wilding 45'; Tretton (yellow card); Preece (yellow card); Steele (yellow card)	Stadium: Spotland Stadium; Attendance: 2247

28 December 1997 25	Macclesfield Town	1–0	Rochdale	Macclesfield
	Howarth 52' (pen.); Brown (yellow card); Power (yellow card)	Report	Gouck (yellow card)	Stadium: Moss Rose; Attendance: 2666; Referee: ML Dean

3 January 1998 26	Mansfield Town	3–0	Rochdale	Mansfield
	Williams 70', 78'; Whitehall 86'; Tallon (yellow card); Christie (yellow card)	Report	Farrell (yellow card)	Stadium: Field Mill; Attendance: 2303; Referee: MS Pike

10 January 1998 27	Rochdale	1–2	Notts County	Rochdale
	Farrell 81' (yellow card); Bailey (yellow card); Gouck (yellow card); Lancashire (yellow card)	Report	Jones 68'; Robinson 78'	Stadium: Spotland Stadium; Attendance: 2387; Referee: AR Hall

17 January 1998 28	Peterborough United	3–1	Rochdale	Peterborough
	Cleaver 24'; Quinn 45', 74'; Payne (yellow card)	Report	Farrell 30'; Stuart (yellow card)	Stadium: London Road Stadium; Attendance: 5676; Referee: MR Halsey

24 January 1998 29	Rochdale	0–2	Leyton Orient	Rochdale
		Report	Inglethorpe 65'; Griffiths 69'	Stadium: Spotland Stadium; Attendance: 1774; Referee: AR Leake

31 January 1998 30	Rochdale	0–0	Cardiff City	Rochdale
		Report		Stadium: Spotland Stadium; Attendance: 1445; Referee: WC Burns

7 February 1998 31	Hull City	0–2	Rochdale	Hull
		Report	Russell 4'; Stuart 64'; Bailey (yellow card); Barlow (yellow card); Pender (yellow card)	Stadium: Boothferry Park; Attendance: 4031; Referee: G Laws

14 February 1998 32	Scunthorpe United	2–0	Rochdale	Scunthorpe
	Regis 16'; Eyre 75'	Report	Bailey (yellow card); Farrell (yellow card)	Stadium: Glanford Park; Attendance: 2284; Referee: T Jones

21 February 1998 33	Rochdale	2–0	Brighton & Hove Albion	Rochdale
	Jones 37'; Gouck 54'; Leonard (yellow card)	Report		Stadium: Spotland Stadium; Attendance: 1865; Referee: PR Richards

24 February 1998 34	Rochdale	2–0	Cambridge United	Rochdale
	Gouck 28', 77'; Bayliss (yellow card)	Report		Stadium: Spotland Stadium; Attendance: 1192; Referee: FG Stretton

28 February 1998 35	Darlington	1–0	Rochdale	Darlington
	Robinson 54'; Hope (yellow card)	Report	Farrell (yellow card); Gouck (yellow card); Leonard (yellow card)	Stadium: Feethams; Attendance: 2181; Referee: MD Messias

3 March 1998 36	Colchester United	0–0	Rochdale	Colchester
		Report	Bayliss (yellow card)	Stadium: Layer Road; Attendance: 2112; Referee: SJ Baines

7 March 1998 37	Rochdale	1–1	Chester City	Rochdale
	Lancashire 68'; Jones (yellow card)	Report	Murphy 85'	Stadium: Spotland Stadium; Attendance: 1955; Referee: RD Furnandiz

14 March 1998 38	Lincoln City	2–0	Rochdale	Lincoln
	Thorpe 14'; Alcide 82'; Holmes (yellow card)	Report	Bailey (yellow card); Hill (yellow card)	Stadium: Sincil Bank; Attendance: 2992; Referee: AR Hall

21 March 1998 39	Rochdale	2–1	Hartlepool United	Rochdale
	Painter 75' (pen.); Farrell 88'; Barlow (yellow card)	Report	Clark 83'; Bradley (yellow card); Barron (yellow card)	Stadium: Spotland Stadium; Attendance: 1395; Referee: CJ Foy

28 March 1998 40	Rochdale	4–1	Doncaster Rovers	Rochdale
	Painter 18'; Stuart 42'; Farrell 58'; Lancashire 59'	Report	Tedaldi 80'; Messer (yellow card); Esdaille (yellow card)	Stadium: Spotland Stadium; Attendance: 1858; Referee: SW Mathieson

4 April 1998 41	Torquay United	0–0	Rochdale	Torquay
		Report		Stadium: Plainmoor; Attendance: 2796; Referee: G Singh

11 April 1998 42	Rochdale	4–0	Scarborough	Rochdale
	Painter 17', 58'; Lancashire 76'; Farrell 90'; Bayliss (yellow card); Stuart (yellow card); Gouck (yellow card)	Report	Snodin (yellow card); Kay (yellow card)	Stadium: Spotland Stadium; Attendance: 1795; Referee: AG Wiley

13 April 1998 43	Swansea City	3–0	Rochdale	Swansea
	Appleby 61', 65'; Walker 74'	Report		Stadium: Vetch Field; Attendance: 2854; Referee: P Rejer

18 April 1998 44	Rochdale	3–0	Exeter City	Rochdale
	Bayliss 50'; Lancashire 60', 62'	Report		Stadium: Spotland Stadium; Attendance: 1850; Referee: GB Frankland

25 April 1998 45	Rotherham United	2–2	Rochdale	Rotherham
	White 69'; Glover 90'; Martindale (yellow card)	Report	Jones 32'; Painter 44' (pen.); Barlow (yellow card); Bailey (yellow card)	Stadium: Millmoor; Attendance: 3463; Referee: R Pearson

2 May 1998 46	Rochdale	2–1	Barnet	Rochdale
	Gouck 22'; Painter 45'; Carden (yellow card); Jones (yellow card); Barlow (yellow card)	Report	McGleish 90'	Stadium: Spotland Stadium; Attendance: 2102; Referee: PS Danson

=== F.A. Cup ===
15 November 1997 1	Rochdale	0–2	Wrexham	Rochdale
	Hill (yellow card); Stuart (yellow card); Gouck (yellow card); Leonard (yellow card)	Report	Roberts 56'; Connolly 65'; Humes (yellow card); Owen (yellow card)	Stadium: Spotland Stadium; Attendance: 3956; Referee: AR Hall

=== Football League Cup (Coca Cola Cup) ===
12 August 1997 1	Rochdale	1–3	Stoke City	Rochdale
	Painter 32'	Report	Kavanagh 26'; Thorne 67'; Forsyth 70'; Tweed (yellow card)	Stadium: Spotland Stadium; Attendance: 2509; Referee: D Pugh

27 August 1997 1	Stoke City	1–1 (4–2 agg.)	Rochdale	Stoke-on-Trent
	Kavanagh 85'	Report	Russell 90'	Stadium: Victoria Ground; Attendance: 12768; Referee: SW Mathieson

=== Football League Trophy (Auto Windscreens Shield) ===
9 December 1997 1	Doncaster Rovers	0–1	Rochdale	Doncaster
	Helliwell (yellow card); Gore (yellow card); Cunningham (yellow card) (yellow-red card) 43'	Report	Reed 39'	Stadium: Belle Vue; Attendance: 580; Referee: JP Robinson

6 January 1998 2	Carlisle United	6–1	Rochdale	Carlisle
	Anthony 23'; Pounewatchy 38'; Stevens 42', 51'; Wright 73', 78'	Report	Stuart 55'	Stadium: Brunton Park; Attendance: 2350; Referee: R Pearson
