= 2003 Football League Third Division play-off final =

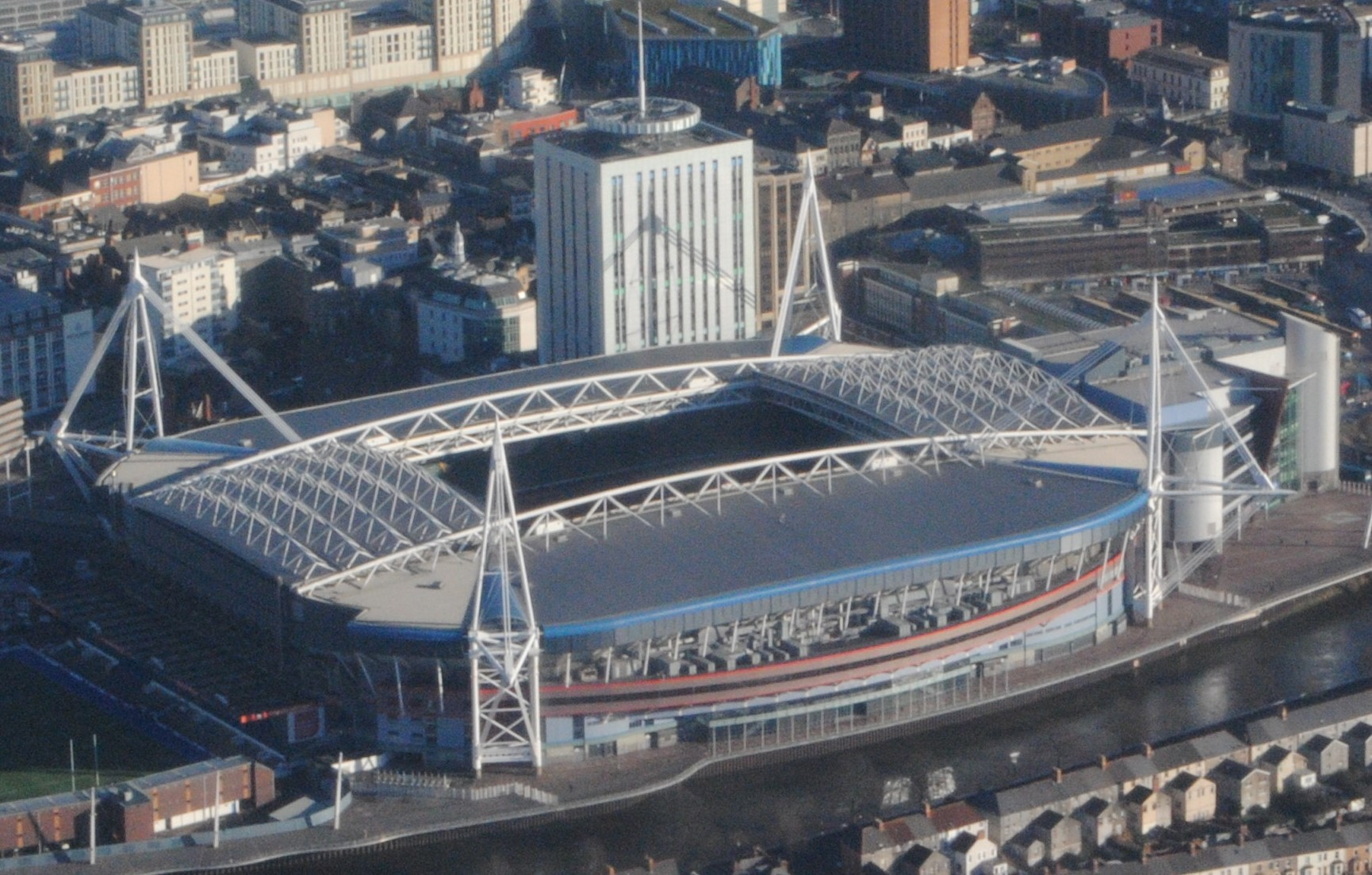
- The final took place at the Millennium Stadium.
AFC Bournemouth	Lincoln City
5	2
- Date: 24 May 2003
- Venue: Millennium Stadium, Cardiff, Wales
- Referee: Alan Kaye
- Attendance: 32,148

The 2003 Football League Third Division play-off final was an association football match which was played on 24 May 2003 at the Millennium Stadium, Cardiff, Wales, between Bournemouth and Lincoln City to determine the fourth and final team to gain promotion from the Football League Third Division to the Second Division. The top three teams of the 2002–03 Third Division season, Rushden & Diamonds, Hartlepool United and Wrexham, gained automatic promotion to the Second Division, while those placed from fourth to seventh place in the table took part in play-offs. The winners of the semi-finals competed for the final place for the 2003–04 season in the Second Division. Bournemouth and Lincoln City defeated Bury and Scunthorpe United, respectively, in the semi-finals.

The final kicked off around 3 p.m. in front of a crowd of 32,148 and was refereed by Alan Kaye. In the 29th minute, Bournemouth took the lead through Steve Fletcher with a volley past Alan Marriott, the Lincoln goalkeeper. Ben Futcher equalised six minutes later from close range from a corner but one minute into first-half stoppage time, Carl Fletcher scored with a header to make it 2–1 to Bournemouth. Eleven minutes into the second half, Bournemouth scored after a counter-attack when Stephen Purches volleyed in a cross from Wade Elliott. Four minutes later Garreth O'Connor made it 4–1. In the 75th minute, Lincoln scored through Mark Bailey but just over a minute later, Fletcher scored his second, a header from O'Connor's free kick, to make the score 5–2 to Bournemouth, the final score.

Bournemouth ended their following season in ninth position in the Second Division, three places and seven points below the play-offs. Lincoln City's finished in seventh place in the Third Division in their next season but were knocked out of the play-offs in the semi-final, losing 4–3 on aggregate to Huddersfield Town.

== Route to the final ==
Football League Third Division final table, leading positions
Pos	Team	Pld	W	D	L	GF	GA	GD	Pts
1	Rushden & Diamonds	46	24	15	7	73	47	+26	87
2	Hartlepool United	46	24	13	9	71	43	+28	85
3	Wrexham	46	23	15	8	84	50	+34	84
4	Bournemouth	46	20	14	12	60	48	+12	74
5	Scunthorpe United	46	19	15	12	68	49	+19	72
6	Lincoln City	46	18	16	12	46	37	+9	70
7	Bury	46	18	16	12	57	56	+1	70

Bournemouth finished the regular 2002–03 season in fourth place in the Football League Third Division, the fourth tier of the English football league system, two positions and four points ahead of Lincoln City. Both therefore missed out on the three automatic places for promotion to the Second Division and instead took part in the play-offs to determine the fourth promoted team. Bournemouth ten points behind Wrexham (who were promoted in third place), eleven behind Hartlepool United (who were promoted in second) and thirteen behind league winners Rushden & Diamonds.

Lincoln City's opponents for their play-off semi-final were Scunthorpe United with the first match of the two-legged tie taking place at Sincil Bank in Lincoln on 10 May 2003. Simon Weaver put Lincoln ahead in the 15th minute with a header from close range and Paul Mayo doubled the lead three minutes later with a volley. Alejandro Calvo García reduced the deficit in the 26th minute when he scored from Peter Beagrie's free kick and the half ended 2–1. Paul Smith extended Lincoln's lead ten minutes after the interval from close range but Calvo García scored his second midway through the half to make it 3–2 to Lincoln. Nathan Stanton then struck from inside Lincoln's penalty area to level the match with his first goal for his club but two late goals from substitute Simon Yeo made the final score 5–3 to Lincoln. The second leg was held four days later at Glanford Park in Scunthorpe. The home side dominated the first half but it ended goalless. Once again Yeo came on as a second-half substitute for Lincoln and scored with two minutes to give his side a 1–0 win and a 6–3 aggregate victory.

In the other semi-final, Bournemouth faced Bury and the first leg was played at Gigg Lane in Bury on 10 May 2003. The home side dominated the first half but were reduced to ten men when Jamie Stuart was sent off in stoppage time for a push on Wade Elliott after the pair had been involved in an altercation after a high tackle from Elliott. Bournemouth increased the pressure in the second half but could not break the deadlock and the match ended goalless. The second leg took place three days later at Dean Court in Bournemouth. Garreth O'Connor opened the scoring in the 21st minute with a low strike past Glyn Garner in the Bury goal. James Hayter then doubled Bournemouth's lead with a diving header from Elliott's cross. In the 60th minute, Hayter scored his second, converting a pass from O'Connor at close range. Andy Preece, who had come on as a substitute for Bury at half-time, scored midway through the second half, lobbing the ball in after a pass from Michael Nelson, but it was to be a consolation goal as the match ended 3–1 and Bournemouth progressed to the final with the same aggregate sccore.

== Match ==
=== Background ===
Both Lincoln City and Bournemouth were making their first appearance in the play-offs. Bournemouth had been relegated to the Third Division the previous season and thus were aiming to make an immediate return to the Second Division. Lincoln City had played in the Third Division since suffering relegation from the Second Division in the 1998–99 season. During the regular season, both matches between the sides had ended in wins for the visiting teams: Bournemouth won 2–1 at Sincil Bank in October 2002 while Lincoln City secured a 1–0 victory at Dean Court the following April. Hayter was Bournemouth's leading scorer in the regular season with 11 goals in total (8 in the league, 1 in the 2002–03 FA Cup and 2 in the Football League Trophy). Lincoln City's top scorer was Ben Futcher who had scored 10 goals (8 in the league, 1 in the FA Cup and 1 in the Football League Trophy).

The referee for the match, which was shown live in the United Kingdom on Sky Sports, was Alan Kaye.

=== Summary ===
The match kicked off around 3 p.m. on 24 May 2003 at the Millennium Stadium under a closed roof in front of a crowd of 32,148. The early stages of the game were described as "uninspiring" by the BBC with neither side dominant, with Bournemouth's Elliott and Stephen Purches coming closest to scoring coming. In the 29th minute, Bournemouth took the lead through Steve Fletcher. He beat Futcher in a race to the ball from Marcus Browning and volleyed it past Alan Marriott, the Lincoln goalkeeper. Futcher scored the equaliser six minutes later when he scored from close range from a corner. One minute into first-half stoppage time, Carl Fletcher flicked a header in from an O'Connor cross to make it 2–1 to Bournemouth at half time.

Neither side made any changes to their personnel during the interval and eleven minutes into the second half, Bournemouth extended their lead. Neil Moss, the Bournemouth goalkeeper, punched the ball clear which enabled his side to counter-attack and Elliott's cross was volleyed into the Lincoln goal by Purches. Four minutes later it was 4–1 after O'Connor ran onto Steve Fletcher's pass, beat Futcher and struck the ball past Marriott. In the 75th minute, Lincoln reduced the deficit when second-half substitute Chris Cornelly's cross was headed into the Bournemouth net by Mark Bailey. Just over a minute later, Fletcher scored with a header from O'Connor's free kick to make the score 5–2 to Bournemouth, which it remained to the final whistle.

=== Details ===
24 May 2003
15:00

Bournemouth	5–2	Lincoln City
S. Fletcher 29'; C. Fletcher 45', 77'; Purches 56'; O'Connor 60'	Report	Futcher 35'; Bailey 75'

Millennium Stadium, Cardiff, Wales
Attendance: 32,148
Referee: Alan Kaye

Bournemouth	Lincoln City

GK	25	Neil Moss
RB	2	Neil Young
CB	7	Carl Fletcher
CB	20	Phil Gulliver
LB	28	Warren Cummings
CM	3	Stephen Purches
CM	4	Marcus Browning
RM	11	Wade Elliott	(substituted off) 90'
LM	12	Garreth O'Connor	(substituted off) 79'
CF	14	James Hayter
CF	10	Steve Fletcher	(substituted off) 85'
Substitutes:
GK	1	Gareth Stewart
MF	8	Brian Stock	(substituted on) 79'
MF	22	Danny Thomas	(substituted on) 90'
FW	16	Derek Holmes	(substituted on) 85'
FW	19	Scott McDonald
Manager:
Sean O'Driscoll

GK	1	Alan Marriott
RB	2	Mark Bailey
CB	15	Simon Weaver	(substituted off) 57'
CB	5	Paul Morgan
CB	4	Ben Futcher
LB	16	Stuart Bimson
RM	7	Paul Smith	(substituted off) 50'
CM	19	Richard Butcher
CM	11	Peter Gain
LM	3	Paul Mayo
CF	9	Dene Cropper	(substituted off) 72'
Substitutes:
DF	24	Matt Bloomer
MF	10	Ben Sedgemore
MF	21	Scott Willis	(substituted on) 72'
MF	25	Chris Cornelly	(substituted on) 57'
FW	12	Simon Yeo	(substituted on) 50'
Manager:
Keith Alexander

== Post-match ==
The Bournemouth manager Sean O'Driscoll said: "I'm delighted for everybody ... Both teams don't score that many goals so we have kept the best till last, but we have another gear to go up now". His counterpart Keith Alexander was disappointed: "I'm proud with what we have done but if we had defended like that all season we would have been relegated."

Bournemouth ended their following season in ninth position in the Second Division, three places and seven points below the play-offs. Lincoln City's finished in seventh place in the Third Division in their next season but were knocked out of the play-offs in the semi-final, losing 4–3 on aggregate to Huddersfield Town.
