= 2006–07 Derby County F.C. season =

Derby County
2006–07 season
- Chairman: Peter Gadsby
- Manager: Billy Davies
- Stadium: Pride Park Stadium
- Championship: 3rd (qualified for play-offs)
- Play-offs: Winners
- FA Cup: Fifth round
- League Cup: Second round
- Top goalscorer: League: Steve Howard (16); All: Steve Howard (19)
- Highest home attendance: 31,920 (vs. Wolverhampton Wanderers, 26 December 2006)
- Lowest home attendance: 21,295 (vs. Barnsley, 1 November 2006)
- Average home league attendance: 25,944

During the 2006–07 English football season, Derby County competed in the Football League Championship.

== Season summary ==
Derby County finished the season in third place in the Championship, four points behind champions Sunderland and two points behind runners-up Birmingham City. With new ownership, Derby had been able to compete in the transfer market for the first time in a number of years, with Luton Town's Steve Howard becoming the club's first £1 million signing since François Grenet six years previously and, alongside captures from Premiership clubs such as West Ham United's Stephen Bywater and Fulham's Dean Leacock, manager Billy Davies began shaping a side capable of competing at the right end of the table. This wasn't apparent from the off, however, and a return of just five points from the club's opening six fixtures did not hint at instant success for Davies, leaving influential and creative players such as Tommy Smith and Iñigo Idiakez to depart the club prior to the closing of the August transfer window.

However, a 1–0 win at Wolverhampton Wanderers on 12 September proved a catalyst as the club lost only four of its next 27 fixtures (a run which included winning all six league fixtures in November and an eight-match winning streak of six league and two FA Cup games from 30 December to 10 February). After a 2–2 draw at home to Hull City on 10 February, Derby were six points clear at the top of the table and had strengthened for the promotion run-in with the signing of Tyrone Mears, Jay McEveley, Gary Teale, David Jones, Craig Fagan, Stephen Pearson and Jon Macken for a combined £5 million. However, a 2–0 defeat away to Plymouth Argyle in the fifth round preceded a notable wobble in results and the club recorded a return of just six points from the next five games, conceding top spot to Birmingham City after a 1–0 defeat at St. Andrews on 9 March. A resounding 5–1 win against Colchester United (by far the biggest win of a campaign which saw victory by a two-goal margin or greater on just six occasions) looked to have put the club back on track, but, after taking just 12 points from the next ten fixtures, the club slipped out of the automatic promotion places altogether and a 2–0 defeat at Crystal Palace in the penultimate game of the season confirmed a 3rd-placed finish and entry into the 2006–07 Championship playoffs.

Derby defeated West Bromwich Albion 1–0 in the play-off final with a goal from Stephen Pearson to return Derby to the topflight of English football for the first time in five seasons.

Striker Steve Howard, who was also Derby's top scorer that season, was awarded the Jack Stamps Trophy as Derby's player of the season. Defender Darren Moore was named in the PFA's Championship Team of the Year.

== Kit ==
Spanish company Joma remained Derby's kits manufacturers, and introduced a new home kit for the season, the first time since 1998 that Derby had not used the same kit for two seasons running. The Derbyshire Building Society continued sponsoring the kits.

== Final league table ==
Pos	Team	Pld	W	D	L	GF	GA	GD	Pts	Promotion, qualification or relegation
1	Sunderland (C, P)	46	27	7	12	76	47	+29	88	Promotion to the Premier League
2	Birmingham City (P)	46	26	8	12	67	42	+25	86	Promotion to the Premier League
3	Derby County (O, P)	46	25	9	12	62	46	+16	84	Qualification for Championship play-offs
4	West Bromwich Albion	46	22	10	14	81	55	+26	76	Qualification for Championship play-offs
5	Wolverhampton Wanderers	46	22	10	14	59	56	+3	76	Qualification for Championship play-offs

Source: RSSSF
Rules for classification: In the Football League goals scored (F) takes precedence over goal difference (GD).
(C) Champions; (O) Play-off winners; (P) Promoted

== Results ==
Derby County's score comes first

=== Legend ===
Win	Draw	Loss

=== Football League Championship ===
Date	Opponent	Venue	Result	Attendance	Scorers
6 August 2006	Southampton	H	2–2	21,939	S Johnson, Peschisolido
8 August 2006	Stoke City	A	0–2	20,013	
12 August 2006	Hull City	A	2–1	15,261	Oakley, Smith (pen)
19 August 2006	Norwich City	H	0–0	22,196	
26 August 2006	Colchester United	A	3–4	4,574	Lupoli (2), Peschisolido
9 September 2006	Sunderland	H	1–2	26,502	Oakley
12 September 2006	Wolverhampton Wanderers	A	1–0	21,546	Howard
16 September 2006	Preston North End	H	1–1	22,220	Howard (pen)
23 September 2006	Sheffield Wednesday	A	2–1	23,659	Peschisolido, Howard
30 September 2006	Southend United	H	3–0	22,395	Lupoli (2), M Johnson
15 October 2006	Plymouth Argyle	A	1–3	13,622	Lupoli
17 October 2006	Queens Park Rangers	A	2–1	10,882	Bisgaard, Howard
21 October 2006	Birmingham City	H	0–1	25,673	
28 October 2006	Cardiff City	A	2–2	17,371	Howard, Barnes
1 November 2006	Barnsley	H	2–1	21,295	Barnes (2)
4 November 2006	West Bromwich Albion	H	2–1	25,342	Oakley, Barnes
11 November 2006	Coventry City	A	2–1	19,701	Stead, Howard
18 November 2006	Luton Town	A	2–0	9,708	Stead, Howard
25 November 2006	Leicester City	H	1–0	28,315	Stead
29 November 2006	Ipswich Town	H	2–1	22,606	Howard, Lupoli
2 December 2006	West Bromwich Albion	A	0–1	20,494	
9 December 2006	Leeds United	A	1–0	20,087	Barnes
16 December 2006	Crystal Palace	H	1–0	23,875	Jones
23 December 2006	Burnley	A	0–0	12,825	
26 December 2006	Wolverhampton Wanderers	H	0–2	31,920	
30 December 2006	Plymouth Argyle	H	1–0	25,775	Bisgaard
1 January 2007	Preston North End	A	2–1	19,204	Howard (2, 1 pen)
13 January 2007	Sheffield Wednesday	H	1–0	28,936	Jones
20 January 2007	Southend United	A	1–0	10,745	Howard
30 January 2007	Burnley	H	1–0	23,122	Howard
3 February 2007	Southampton	A	1–0	27,656	Howard
10 February 2007	Hull City	H	2–2	28,140	Teale, Moore
21 February 2007	Stoke City	H	0–2	24,897	
24 February 2007	Sunderland	A	1–2	36,049	Barnes
2 March 2007	Colchester United	H	5–1	26,704	Jones, Lupoli, Barnes, Howard (pen), Barker (own goal)
6 March 2007	Norwich City	A	2–1	23,462	Jones (2)
9 March 2007	Birmingham City	A	0–1	20,962	
13 March 2007	Queens Park Rangers	H	1–1	27,567	Moore
17 March 2007	Cardiff City	H	3–1	27,689	Howard (2, 1 pen), Barnes
31 March 2007	Barnsley	A	2–1	17,059	Jones, Oakley
6 April 2007	Leicester City	A	1–1	24,704	Fagan
9 April 2007	Coventry City	H	1–1	29,940	Oakley
14 April 2007	Ipswich Town	A	1–2	24,319	Oakley
20 April 2007	Luton Town	H	1–0	28,499	Nyatanga
29 April 2007	Crystal Palace	A	0–2	19,545	
6 May 2007	Leeds United	H	2–0	31,183	Currie, Mears

=== Championship play-offs ===
Round	Date	Opponent	Venue	Result	Attendance	Goalscorers
SF 1st Leg	12 May 2007	Southampton	A	2–1	30,602	Howard (2, 1 pen)
SF 2nd Leg	15 May 2007	Southampton	H	2–3 (won 4–3 on pens)	31,569	Moore, Best (own goal)
F	28 May 2007	West Bromwich Albion	N	1–0	74,993	Pearson

=== FA Cup ===
Round	Date	Opponent	Venue	Result	Attendance	Goalscorers
R3	6 January 2007	Wrexham	H	3–1	15,609	Lupoli (3)
R4	27 January 2007	Bristol Rovers	H	1–0	25,033	Peschisolido
R5	17 February 2007	Plymouth Argyle	A	0–2	18,026	

=== League Cup ===
Round	Date	Opponent	Venue	Result	Attendance	Goalscorers
R1	22 August 2006	Stockport County	A	1–0	3,394	M Johnson
R2	20 September 2006	Doncaster Rovers	A	3–3 (lost 7–8 on pens)	5,598	Howard, Moore, Lupoli

== Players ==
=== First-team squad ===
Squad at end of season

Note: Flags indicate national team as defined under FIFA eligibility rules; some limited exceptions apply. Players may hold more than one non-FIFA nationality.

No.	Pos.	Nation	Player
1	GK	(England) ENG	Lee Camp (Note: Camp was born in Derby, England, and represented them at U-21 level, but also qualifies to represent Northern Ireland internationally and would make his full international debut for Northern Ireland in March 2011.)
2	DF	(England) ENG	Marc Edworthy
3	DF	(Guinea) GUI	Mo Camara
4	DF	(Scotland) SCO	Jay McEveley (Note: McEveley was born in Liverpool, England, and represented them at U-20 and U-21 level, but also qualified to represent Scotland internationally and represented them at B level before making his international debut for Scotland in August 2007.)
5	DF	(England) ENG	Dean Leacock
6	DF	(Jamaica) JAM	Michael Johnson (Note: Johnson was born in Nottingham, England, but also qualified to represent Jamaica internationally and made his international debut for Jamaica in 1999.)
7	MF	(England) ENG	David Jones
8	MF	(Denmark) DEN	Morten Bisgaard
9	FW	(England) ENG	Steve Howard (Note: Howard was born in Durham, England, but also qualified to represent Scotland internationally and would later represent them at B level.)
10	FW	(England) ENG	Craig Fagan
11	FW	(Canada) CAN	Paul Peschisolido
12	FW	(Republic of Ireland) IRL	Jon Macken (Note: Macken was born in Blackley, England, and represented them at U-20 level, but also qualifies to represent the Republic of Ireland internationally and made his international debut for the Republic of Ireland in August 2004.)
13	GK	(England) ENG	Lee Grant
14	DF	(England) ENG	Richard Jackson
15	MF	(England) ENG	Ryan Smith
16	FW	(Italy) ITA	Arturo Lupoli (on loan from Arsenal)
17	DF	(England) ENG	Paul Boertien

No.	Pos.	Nation	Player
18	MF	(England) ENG	Seth Johnson
19	MF	(England) ENG	Darren Currie (on loan from Ipswich Town)
20	FW	(England) ENG	Lee Holmes
21	DF	(Scotland) SCO	Bob Malcolm
22	MF	(England) ENG	Matt Oakley (captain)
23	DF	(Jamaica) JAM	Darren Moore (Note: Moore was born in Birmingham, England, but also qualified to represent Jamaica internationally through his parents and made his international debut for Jamaica in 1999.)
24	DF	(England) ENG	Tyrone Mears (Note: Mears was born in Chadderton, England, but represented Jamaica in February 2009, apparently qualifying through his father. It was later discovered that his father was actually from Sierra Leone and Mears was ineligible to represent Jamaica.) (on loan from West Ham United)
25	MF	(Scotland) SCO	Stephen Pearson
27	MF	(Scotland) SCO	Gary Teale
28	FW	(England) ENG	Giles Barnes (Note: Barnes was born in Barking and Dagenham, England, and represented them at U-19 level, but also qualifies to represent Jamaica internationally through his paternal grandparents and would make his international debut for Jamaica in May 2015.)
29	FW	(England) ENG	Lionel Ainsworth
30	DF	(Wales) WAL	Lewin Nyatanga (Note: Nyatanga was born in Burton upon Trent, England, but also qualifies to represent Wales internationally through his mother and Zimbabwe through his father, and represented Wales at U-17 and U-21 level before making his international debut for Wales in March 2006.)
31	DF	(Australia) AUS	James Meredith
32	MF	(England) ENG	Tom Cumberworth
34	MF	(Belgium) BEL	Jeremy Bossekota
35	GK	(Wales) WAL	Steven Cann (Note: Cann was born in South Africa, but also qualifies to represent both Wales and England internationally, and has represented Wales at U-17, U-19, and semi-professional level.)
43	GK	(England) ENG	Stephen Bywater

=== Left club during season ===
Note: Flags indicate national team as defined under FIFA eligibility rules; some limited exceptions apply. Players may hold more than one non-FIFA nationality.

No.	Pos.	Nation	Player
4	MF	(England) ENG	Adam Bolder (to Queens Park Rangers)
7	FW	(England) ENG	Tommy Smith (to Watford)
10	FW	(England) ENG	Jon Stead (on loan from Sunderland)
12	MF	(England) ENG	Paul Thirlwell (to Carlisle United)

No.	Pos.	Nation	Player
19	MF	(England) ENG	Nathan Doyle (to Hull City)
27	FW	(Spain) ESP	Iñigo Idiakez (to Southampton)
33	DF	(England) ENG	Theo Streete (to Rotherham United)
