= Chris Hurst =

Chris or Christopher Hurst may refer to:

- Chris Hurst (footballer) (born 1973), English footballer
- Christopher Hurst (politician) (born 1954), American politician from Washington State
- Christopher Hurst (cricketer) (1886–1963), English cricketer
- Christopher Hurst (actor), Zimbabwean actor
- Chris Hurst (Virginia politician) (born 1987), American politician and former TV news anchor from Virginia
