= Stephen Bywater =

English footballer

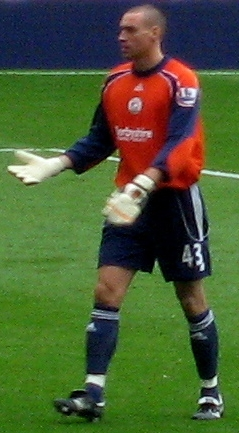
- Bywater playing for Derby County in 2007

Personal information
- Full name: Stephen Michael Bywater
- Date of birth: 7 June 1981 (age 45)
- Place of birth: Oldham, England
- Height: 6 ft 2 in (1.88 m)
- Position: Goalkeeper

Youth career
- 1997–1998: Rochdale

Senior career*
Years	Team	Apps	(Gls)
1997–1998	Rochdale	0	(0)
1998–2006	West Ham United	59	(0)
1999	→ Wycombe Wanderers (loan)	2	(0)
1999–2000	→ Hull City (loan)	4	(0)
2001	→ Wolverhampton Wanderers (loan)	0	(0)
2002	→ Cardiff City (loan)	0	(0)
2005	→ Coventry City (loan)	14	(0)
2006	→ Derby County (loan)	2	(0)
2006–2011	Derby County	148	(0)
2008	→ Ipswich Town (loan)	17	(0)
2011	→ Cardiff City (loan)	8	(0)
2011	→ Sheffield Wednesday (loan)	12	(0)
2012–2013	Sheffield Wednesday	20	(0)
2013–2015	Millwall	7	(0)
2014–2015	→ Gillingham (loan)	13	(0)
2015	Doncaster Rovers	21	(0)
2015	Kerala Blasters	12	(0)
2016–2020	Burton Albion	57	(0)
Total		396	(0)

International career
2001–2003	England U21	6	(0)
- * Club domestic league appearances and goals

Stephen Michael Bywater (born 7 June 1981) is an English former professional footballer who played as a goalkeeper.

He has made appearances for thirteen clubs, most notably for Derby County, where he made over 150 appearances and won the 2007 Championship play-off final and for West Ham United, where he spent eight seasons, made over 60 appearances and won the 2005 Championship play-off final. He is also a former England Under-21 international. Bywater has worn the number 43 shirt in memory of his mentor and coach, Les Sealey, who died aged 43 in 2001.

== Club career ==
=== West Ham United ===
Born in Oldham, Greater Manchester, Bywater attended the Blue Coat School, Oldham as a boy starting his career in August 1997 with Rochdale. His only first team appearance was against Carlisle United in a Football League Trophy game which Rochdale lost 6–1. He was brought to West Ham as a 16-year-old by Harry Redknapp in February 1998 for £250,000, rising to £1.75 million depending on performances and achievements. He graduated through the youth set-up and featured in West Ham's 1999 FA Youth Cup winning team along with Joe Cole and Michael Carrick.

He spent the next two seasons learning from former Manchester United, Luton Town, Aston Villa and Coventry City goalkeeper Les Sealey and sitting in the pecking order behind Craig Forrest, Bernard Lama and Shaka Hislop. With first team opportunities limited, Bywater joined Wycombe Wanderers on loan in September 1999, making two appearances, and then went to Hull City on loan in November 1999, making four appearances. A broken leg for Shaka Hislop meant a debut for Bywater at the age of 19 against Bradford City in February 2000, in a game that saw Bradford score four times but which West Ham eventually won 5–4. Bywater also appeared in the final three games of the 1999–00 season, against Arsenal, Sunderland and Leeds United and made a single appearance in the following season against Bradford in February 2001.

Wolves signed Bywater on loan in July 2001 to ease a goalkeeping crisis but he returned to West Ham the following month having not made an appearance for Wolves other than on the bench in the opening game of the season against Portsmouth. His chances to move up the pecking order were limited with the club signing David James in July 2001 and the retention of Shaka Hislop as James was injured on international duty in August 2001, and he did not make a single appearance for West Ham in the 2001–02 season nor in the 2002–03 season. He joined Cardiff City on a one-month loan at the end of March 2002 but made no appearance there.

Eventually, after the club was relegated in 2002–03 and David James moved to Manchester City in January 2004, Bywater became a regular starter in the first-team, making 23 appearances as West Ham reached the First Division play-off final, where they were beaten 1–0 by Crystal Palace. He signed a three-year contract extension in June 2004, saying "I am very pleased to have signed on for another three years at West Ham. We were very unlucky last year and I am sure that we will start next season with a squad capable of challenging for promotion again. The club have invested a lot in my career and the manager showed great faith in me last season. I am determined to repay everyone at the club by helping the team back into the Premiership."

He soon had to share the role of the club's primary keeper with Jimmy Walker who was brought in from Walsall in June 2004 to provide competition for Bywater. Bywater made 39 league and cup appearances in the 2004–05 season for West Ham as the club were promoted to the Premiership, and appeared in the play-off final at the Millennium Stadium in May 2005, coming on as a late substitute for the injured Jimmy Walker in the 1–0 victory over Preston North End.

The signing of Roy Carroll in June 2005 and the re-signing of Shaka Hislop on a one-year contract in July 2005 once again limited Bywater's first-team opportunities and he joined Coventry City in August 2005, on loan until the end of the year, where he made 14 appearances. An injury to Carroll however led to Bywater being recalled from Coventry in October 2005. He made a single appearance for West Ham in the remainder of the 2005–06 season, against West Bromwich Albion in November 2005.

=== Derby County ===
Bywater joined Derby County in August 2006 on an initial emergency loan deal for two weeks and signed a permanent three-year deal two weeks later for a fee of £225,000. Before the 2006–07 season, he wore the number 43 shirt at Derby as a tribute to his mentor and former goalkeeping coach Les Sealey, who died at the age of 43 in 2001, saying, "Les looked after me most of the time. He took me to training every day, coached me and advised me on life. I know he is watching over me and that he wants me to do well, so that was for him." Bywater made 43 league and cup appearances in the 2006–07 season as Derby reached the Championship play-off final, where they beat West Bromwich Albion 1–0 to secure a place in the Premier League.

In June 2007, Bywater reiterated his desire to play for England and his hopes to be noticed in the 2007–08 season, saying "I grew up with a few of the lads like Paul Robinson, Rob Green and Chris Kirkland and they are good but I don't think they are anything special. I do believe if I play well and have a good season, I will be up there in contention. I am confident but not cocky." After a first half of the season that saw Derby County rooted to the foot of the Premier League, Bywater joined Ipswich Town on loan in January 2008 for the rest of the season. Jim Magilton, manager of Ipswich Town, described him as, "...a young, ambitious keeper who knows what is needed to win promotion from this division." He made his debut for Ipswich Town against Sheffield Wednesday in February 2008 and made 17 appearances in the remainder of the 2007–08 season as Ipswich finished below the play-off places. Following Derby's relegation at the end of the 2007/08 season, Bywater almost returned to the Premier League with a move to Tottenham Hotspur. However, when the deal fell through, Bywater remained with The Rams and, after initially playing as second fiddle to Roy Carroll for the start of the 2008–09 season, Bywater regained and retained his place in the team after Carroll was sent off against Norwich City. His form was good enough that he held the number 1 position for the rest of the season and he signed a new 3-year contract with Derby on 13 January 2009. He made his 100th appearance for the club away to Blackpool on 8 August 2009, keeping a clean sheet. In December 2009, after keeping two successive clean sheets, manager Nigel Clough praised Bywater's performances in the two games: "Stephen has been exemplary. He is fully fit and approaching the peak of his career. He has a good temperament, which is probably a factor of his age. He works hard in training and, like all goalkeepers, he is a bit daft." An injury sustained away to Reading in March 2010 saw Bywater ruled out for two games which brought to an end a run of 71 consecutive league appearances in the Derby goal. He returned and put in Championship Team of the Week performance as Derby drew 0–0 at Sheffield Wednesday. After Derby secured survival with a 1–1 draw with Crystal Palace, Bywater sat out the last two games of the season to rest a sprained rib joint. He returned to the first team in the 2010–11 season and made his 150th appearance for the club in a 2–0 defeat at Hull City. Bywater played every minute of Derby's opening 11 games of the season, keeping two clean sheets, before a wrist injury sustained in training during the October international break ruled him out for a month. He returned to the first team in November 2011, which coincided with a dreadful run of form which saw Derby drop from 4th to 18th in 3 months. Bywater then sustained an injury in a 1–0 defeat to Hull City on 22 February 2011, ruling him out for several weeks.

On 4 March 2011, Bywater joined Cardiff City on loan until the end of the season. He made his debut the following day in a 2–0 loss to Ipswich Town. Following Cardiff's playoff semi final defeat to Reading, in which a Bywater error cost Cardiff an important goal, Bywater returned to Derby. His future at The Rams was cast into serious doubt when he was not given a squad number ahead of the 2011–12 season and this was confirmed when Derby's goalkeeping coach Martin Taylor revealed "He's not in the squad at all. Nothing against Stephen because he's worked really hard but he doesn't figure in our plans. At his age he just needs to play games and get in the shop window." On 31 December 2011, Bywaters's contract was terminated by mutual consent.

=== Sheffield Wednesday ===
On 20 September 2011, Bywater joined Sheffield Wednesday on loan for 3 months due to an injury picked up by first choice 'keeper Nicky Weaver. Bywater's loan spell proved to be very successful, with Wednesday losing just 1 of his 12 games and keeping six clean sheets, moving boss Gary Megson to state his intention to make Bywater's move permanent, with Derby manager Nigel Clough confirming talks with Wednesday over a potential transfer. On 30 December 2011, it was reported that Bywater was to join Wednesday on a permanent transfer when the January transfer window opened. On 31 December 2011, Bywater signed for Wednesday on a permanent transfer, with a contract until the end of the 2011–2012 season, the move went ahead on 1 January 2012. After this permanent move, he was initially second choice behind Nicky Weaver before taking over as first choice in a 3–1 win against Scunthorpe United on 24 January 2012. Bywater played in all the remaining games of the season, keeping 14 clean sheets in 34 appearances. Wednesday secured promotion to the Championship by coming runners up in League One, narrowly finishing ahead of local rivals Sheffield United.

Bywater then entered contract talks with the club, with a new one-year contract signed on 27 June 2012, upon signing this new contract Bywater praised manager David Jones and called Wednesday "the biggest club out of the Premiership and that is a fact". Bywater's goalkeeping competition for 2012–13 season consisted of Arron Jameson, Chris Kirkland and Nicky Weaver.

=== Millwall ===
In June 2013 Bywater signed a two-year contract with Millwall, becoming manager, Steve Lomas' first signing for the club. He made his Millwall debut on 6 August 2013 in the first round of the League Cup in a 2–1 home win against AFC Wimbledon. Bywater played in Millwall's next three league games, against Ipswich Town, Huddersfield Town and Sheffield Wednesday and a 2–1 defeat by Nottingham Forest in the second round of the League Cup. Regular goalkeeper, David Forde resumed in the goalkeeper position for Millwall until January 2014. On 18 January 2014 Bywater replaced Forde at half-time in a 1–0 home win against Ipswich Town, a match which saw new Millwall manager, Ian Holloway's first win a manager of the club.

On 15 August 2014, he joined Gillingham on loan until 3 January as cover for the injured Stuart Nelson. Bywater was released by Millwall on 14 January 2015 when his contract with them was cancelled. He had not appeared for Millwall since February 2014.

=== Doncaster Rovers ===
In January 2015 Bywater signed a six-month contract with League One side Doncaster Rovers. He made his first appearance for Doncaster against Barnsley on 17 January in a 1–0 win. He was released by the club at the end of the 2014–15 season.

=== Kerala Blasters ===
In August 2015 Bywater signed with Indian Super League side Kerala Blasters.

=== Burton Albion ===
Bywater joined Burton Albion on 13 January 2016, as backup to Jon McLaughlin. In summer 2017, the Brewers decided to release McLaughlin and Bywater was installed as first choice, playing 44 league games in 2017–18, however Burton were relegated from the Championship at the end of the season. Following relegation, Bywater returned to backup status behind loan keeper Bradley Collins, and then another loan keeper, Kieran O'Hara, in the 2019–20 season. Following the signing of Ben Garratt in October 2019, Bywater dropped to third choice, and stopped taking a salary and attending training while remaining available in an emergency. He was released at the end of the season and then announced his retirement.

== International career ==
Bywater made his England U19 debut during 1999 and rotated in the role with both Paul Robinson and Chris Kirkland. He later progressed to the U21 team with the same group of players though by that time both Kirkland and Robinson had become established league players. Injuries had limited his opportunities with both a broken finger and later on a fractured wrist holding up his development and limiting his opportunities. He made six appearances for the U21 team.

Bywater was tipped to be called up for the England squad after Derby's promotion to the Premier League in 2006–07, but he was not picked.

== Personal life ==
Bywater has been involved in several controversies over the years. In an October 2007 interview with Clare Tomlinson on Sky Sports' Goals on Sunday programme he spelt out the word "cunt" whilst live on air as part of an anecdote.

In September 2010, Bywater stirred more controversy with regards to a provocative art installation in his garden in Sutton on the Hill, Derbyshire. The installation – a horse box with mattresses and a sex doll strapped to it with graffiti sprayed on the side – brought complaints from neighbours, who described the piece as "very ugly" and an "eyesore". Bywater, who claimed that art was his latest hobby and the installation was his "masterpiece", issued a statement via Derby County stating "I would like to apologise to any supporters and local residents in Derbyshire who have been offended. It was and is still my view that my actions were made as a private citizen and in no way linked to Derby County Football Club. However, now it has been brought into the public domain, I acknowledge that this does not reflect well on me as a professional or the Club in general. I apologise again if my actions have in anyway damaged my reputation or the reputation of the Club." He eventually auctioned the piece, announcing the eBay sale via his Twitter page, saying all the proceeds would be donated to the Teen Pride charity.

== Career statistics ==
Club	Season	League			FA Cup		League Cup		Other		Total	
Club	Season	Division	Apps	Goals	Apps	Goals	Apps	Goals	Apps	Goals	Apps	Goals
Rochdale	1997–98	Third Division	0	0	0	0	0	0	1 (Note: Appearance in Football League Trophy)	0	1	0
West Ham United	1997–98	Premier League	0	0	0	0	0	0	0	0	0	0
West Ham United	1998–99	Premier League	0	0	0	0	0	0	0	0	0	0
West Ham United	1999–2000	Premier League	4	0	0	0	0	0	0	0	4	0
West Ham United	2000–01	Premier League	1	0	0	0	0	0	0	0	1	0
West Ham United	2001–02	Premier League	0	0	0	0	0	0	0	0	0	0
West Ham United	2002–03	Premier League	0	0	0	0	0	0	0	0	0	0
West Ham United	2003–04	First Division	17	0	3	0	0	0	3 (Note: Appearances in Football League First Division play-offs)	0	23	0
West Ham United	2004–05	First Division	36	0	2	0	0	0	1 (Note: Appearance(s) in Football League Championship play-offs)	0	39	0
West Ham United	2005–06	Premier League	1	0	0	0	0	0	0	0	1	0
West Ham United	Total		59	0	5	0	0	0	4	0	68	0
Wycombe Wanderers (loan)	1999–2000	Second Division	2	0	0	0	0	0	0	0	2	0
Hull City (loan)	1999–2000	Third Division	4	0	0	0	0	0	0	0	4	0
Wolverhampton Wanderers (loan)	2001–02	First Division	0	0	0	0	0	0	0	0	0	0
Cardiff City (loan)	2001–02	Second Division	0	0	0	0	0	0	0	0	0	0
Coventry City (loan)	2005–06	Championship	14	0	0	0	0	0	0	0	14	0
Derby County (loan)	2006–07	Championship	2	0	0	0	0	0	0	0	2	0
Derby County	2006–07	Championship	35	0	3	0	0	0	3	0	41	0
Derby County	2007–08	Premier League	18	0	0	0	1	0	0	0	19	0
Derby County	2008–09	Championship	31	0	3	0	0	0	0	0	34	0
Derby County	2009–10	Championship	42	0	4	0	1	0	0	0	47	0
Derby County	2010–11	Championship	22	0	1	0	1	0	0	0	24	0
Derby County	2011–12	Championship	0	0	0	0	0	0	0	0	0	0
Derby County	Total		150	0	11	0	3	0	3	0	167	0
Ipswich Town (loan)	2007–08	Championship	17	0	0	0	0	0	0	0	17	0
Cardiff City (loan)	2010–11	Championship	8	0	0	0	0	0	2	0	10	0
Sheffeld Wednesday (loan)	2011–12	League One	12	0	0	0	0	0	0	0	12	0
Sheffeld Wednesday	2011–12	League One	20	0	2	0	0	0	0	0	22	0
Sheffeld Wednesday	2012–13	Championship	0	0	2	0	2	0	0	0	4	0
Sheffeld Wednesday	Total		32	0	4	0	2	0	0	0	38	0
Millwall	2013–14	Championship	7	0	0	0	2	0	0	0	9	0
Gillingham (loan)	2014–15	League One	13	0	0	0	1	0	0	0	14	0
Doncaster Rovers	2014–15	League One	21	0	0	0	0	0	0	0	21	0
Kerala Blasters	2015	Indian Super League	12	0	-		-		-		12	0
Burton Albion	2015–16	League One	0	0	0	0	0	0	0	0	0	0
Burton Albion	2016–17	Championship	5	0	0	0	1	0	0	0	6	0
Burton Albion	2017–18	Championship	44	0	1	0	0	0	0	0	45	0
Burton Albion	2018–19	League One	8	0	0	0	2	0	0	0	10	0
Burton Albion	2019–20	League One	0	0	0	0	0	0	1 (Note: Appearance in EFL Trophy)	0	1	0
Burton Albion	Total		57	0	1	0	3	0	1	0	62	0
Career Total			396	0	21	0	11	0	11	0	439	0

== Honours ==
West Ham United Youth

- FA Youth Cup: 1998–99

West Ham United

- Football League Championship play-offs: 2005

Derby County

- Football League Championship play-offs: 2007

Sheffield Wednesday

- Football League One second-place promotion: 2011–12
