= Peter Kaye =

English footballer

Personal information
- Full name: Peter John Kaye
- Date of birth: 4 February 1979 (age 47)
- Place of birth: Huddersfield, England
- Position: Forward

Youth career
- ?–1996: Huddersfield Town

Senior career*
Years	Team	Apps	(Gls)
1996–1998	Huddersfield Town	1	(0)
- * Club domestic league appearances and goals as of 2 April 2007

Peter John Kaye (born 4 February 1979 in Huddersfield) is an English former professional footballer.

Kaye began his career as a trainee with Huddersfield Town, although he had a trial with Manchester United in 1994. He turned professional in August 1996, and made his league debut came on 4 May 1997 when he replaced Jeremy Illingworth as a second-half substitute in the goalless draw at home to Swindon Town. This was to be his only appearance in the Huddersfield first team and he was released at the end of the following season.
