= Arturo Lupoli =

Italian footballer (born 1987)

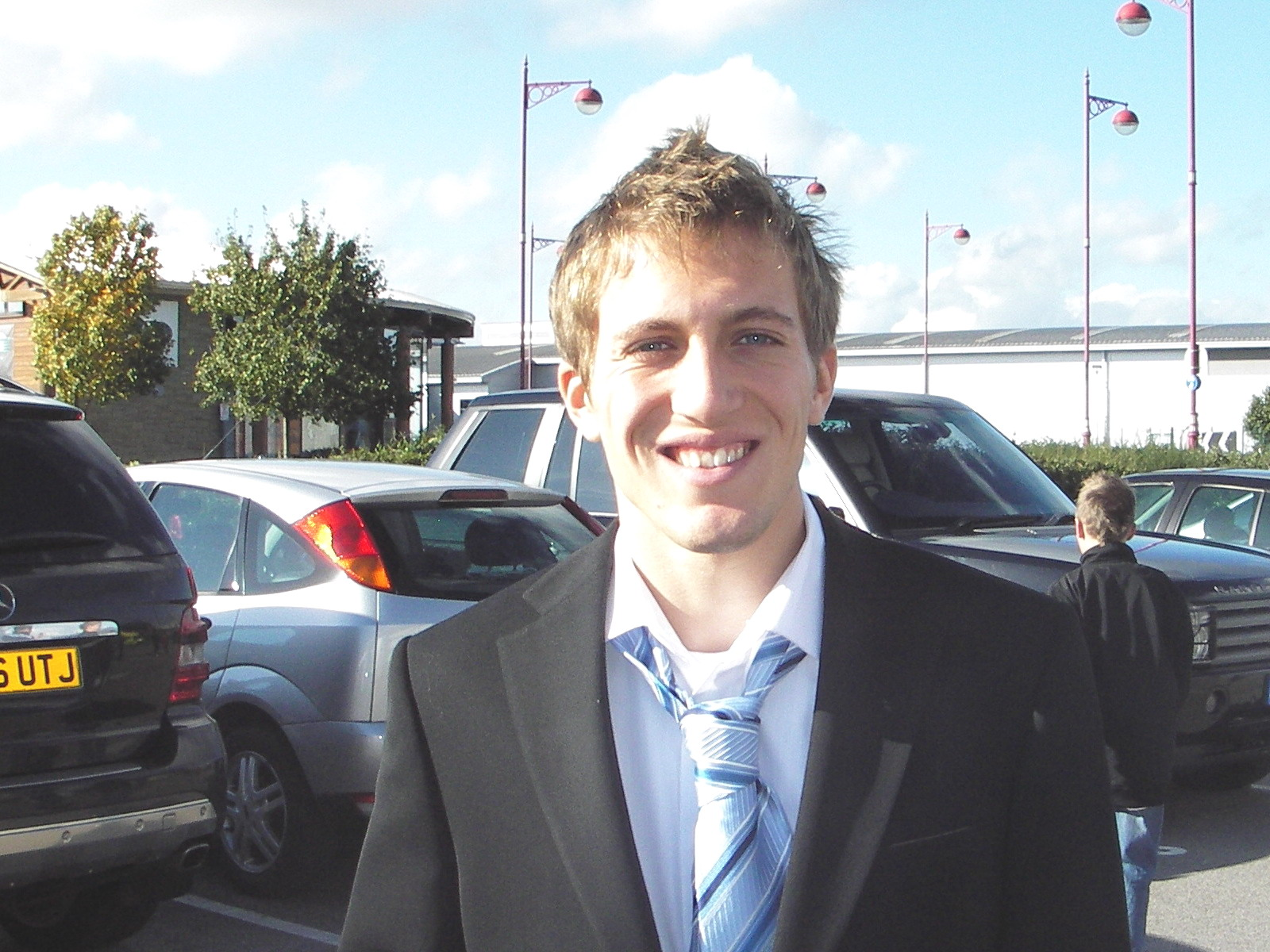
- Lupoli on loan at Derby County in 2006

Personal information
- Date of birth: 24 June 1987 (age 39)
- Place of birth: Brescia, Italy
- Height: 1.73 m (5 ft 8 in)
- Positions: Striker; winger

Team information
- Current team: Borgo San Donnino

Youth career
- 2003–2004: Parma
- 2004–2005: Arsenal

Senior career*
Years	Team	Apps	(Gls)
2005–2007	Arsenal	1	(0)
2006–2007	→ Derby County (loan)^{[A]}	35	(7)
2007–2009	Fiorentina	0	(0)
2008	→ Treviso (loan)	17	(1)
2008–2009	→ Norwich City (loan)	17	(4)
2009	→ Sheffield United (loan)	11	(2)
2009–2011	Ascoli	66	(11)
2011–2013	Grosseto	45	(8)
2013–2015	Varese	23	(6)
2014	→ Budapest Honvéd (loan)	4	(0)
2015	Frosinone	11	(1)
2015–2017	Pisa	10	(2)
2016	→ Catania (loan)	10	(0)
2017	Südtirol	12	(0)
2017–2019	Fermana	72	(11)
2019–2020	Virtus Verona	17	(2)
2020–2021	Montegiorgio	21	(8)
2021–2022	Borgo San Donnino	5	(0)
Total		377	(63)

International career
2003	Italy U-16	9	(11)
2003–2004	Italy U-17	10	(4)
2005	Italy U-18	2	(1)
2005	Italy U-19	6	(0)
2006–2007	Italy U-21	5	(2)
- * Club domestic league appearances and goals as of 14 November 2021

Arturo Lupoli (born 24 June 1987) is a former Italian footballer who last played as a forward for Borgo San Donnino.

His former clubs include Parma, Arsenal and Derby County, where he spent the 2006–07 season on loan.

== Club career ==
=== Parma ===
Originally from Frattamaggiore, Lupoli began his footballing career with Italian side Parma. During his Allievi (Under-17) season he scored 45 goals in 22 games, one of the best tallies ever recorded in Italian youth history. However, by mid-2004 his contract had expired. Lupoli signed an Arsenal contract by way of a scholarship, the Gunners paid Parma £200,000 training compensation.

=== Arsenal ===
Lupoli's debut in the Arsenal first-team was in a match against Manchester City in the League Cup on 27 October 2004. His next match, against Everton in the same competition, brought him his first goals for the club, two of Arsenal's three goals in the 3–1 victory on 9 November. He also played in the match against Manchester United which saw Arsenal's exit from the competition. He was Arsenal's top scorer at youth/reserve level in 2004–05, with 27 goals in 32 appearances. That season he started Arsenal's FA Cup fifth round replay against Sheffield United due to Robin van Persie, Dennis Bergkamp and Jose Antonio Reyes all being suspended, and Thierry Henry being injured. Arsenal went on to win the cup that year but Lupoli was left out of their final squad.

Lupoli scored prolifically at youth/reserve team level during the 2005–06 season, alongside Nicklas Bendtner. He also figured in the Gunners' 2005–06 League Cup campaign, winning the League Cup New Talent Award. He scored his third and final Arsenal goal in the 3–0 win over Reading in this campaign. It was during this season that he made his only league appearance for the Gunners, in a 1–0 loss at Blackburn.

Lupoli moved to Derby County on a season-long loan on 18 August 2006, and debuted for Derby in the 0–0 draw at home to Norwich City the following day. He then got a brace against Colchester United in a game which Derby lost 4–3. On 6 January 2007, Lupoli scored Derby County's first hat-trick for over a decade in a 3–1 victory third round FA Cup tie against Wrexham.

Lupoli was linked with a transfer to either of the two Milan based football giants; A.C. Milan and Inter Milan. However, Pierpaolo Marino, General Manager of Napoli, announced he had Lupoli's word he'd come to Napoli when his contract with Arsenal had expired, since it was his dream to play for his home city club. Despite this, on 26 February 2007, Lupoli signed a pre-contract with Fiorentina. Lupoli stressed, however, that he would do his absolute best for Derby for the remainder of the season, and in his first match for Derby after confirming the Fiorentina move, scored a goal and provided an assist.

=== Fiorentina ===
Lupoli finally completed his move to ACF Fiorentina on 1 July 2007, signing a five-year deal with the Viola in a free transfer. However, he never made his debut with the Tuscan side after joining Treviso F.B.C. 1993 on loan for a period.

On 22 July 2008, Lupoli moved to Championship side Norwich City on loan for the 2008–09 season. Manager Glenn Roeder's connections with Arsène Wenger are believed to have been behind the club's interest in the player.

=== Norwich ===
Following the finalisation of his loan move to the Canaries, Arturo told the club's official website "I am very happy to be here and hope to contribute for a great season for Norwich City and to be successful. I spoke to the Manager and I really feel that he wants me here. I know a lot about Norwich City – I was with Arsenal when they and my teammate David Bentley were in the Premier League and have followed their progress."

He took the squad number 18, and made his competitive debut for the club against Coventry City in a 2–0 loss. His first goals for the club came on 23 August 2008 versus Cardiff City at Ninian Park, as Norwich came from two goals behind to draw 2–2, Lupoli scoring both late on.

After spending a long time out of favour with manager Glenn Roeder, Lupoli publicly stated that he would leave the club in January if not given a run in the team. In the following game, an FA Cup tie against Charlton Athletic at The Valley, he proved his worth by coming off the bench to score Norwich's equaliser after fans chanted his name throughout the match. However, after getting frustrated at a lack of first team football Lupoli's loan was terminated on 2 February 2009.

=== Sheffield United ===
On 2 February 2009, Lupoli joined Sheffield United on loan until the end of the 2008–09 season. He made his debut for The Blades a few days later when he was given a starting role in the Steel City Derby against local rivals Sheffield Wednesday. He needed only five minutes on the pitch to find the net but despite scoring on his debut he was unable to prevent United's loss to their bitter rivals. Although suggesting he wished to stay at Bramall Lane beyond the length of his loan deal he returned to Fiorentina after the Blades failed to clinch promotion having made eleven appearances and scoring two goals in a disappointing loan spell.

=== Later career ===
On 25 June 2009, Lupoli transferred to Ascoli in a co-ownership deal. Two years later, he transferred to fellow Serie B side Grosseto on a free transfer. In July 2013, after two years at Grosseto, Lupoli moved to another team of the same league on a free transfer, this time Varese.

On 21 February 2014, Lupoli joined Budapest Honvéd, and on 2 February the following year he was signed by Frosinone.

In summer 2015 Lupoli was signed by A.C. Pisa 1909. On 1 February 2016 he was signed by Lega Pro club Calcio Catania in a temporary deal. He returned to Pisa at the end of season, and on 27 January 2017, Lupoli signed a one-and-a-year contract with Lega Pro club Südtirol after being released by Pisa.

On 24 July 2019, he joined Virtus Verona.

On 26 August 2021, he joined Borgo San Donnino in Serie D.

== Career statistics ==
Appearances and goals by club, season and competition
Club	Season	League			National cup (Note: Includes FA Cup)		League cup (Note: Includes Football League Cup)		Europe		Other		Total	
Club	Season	Division	Apps	Goals	Apps	Goals	Apps	Goals	Apps	Goals	Apps	Goals	Apps	Goals
Arsenal	2004–05	Premier League	0	0	1	0	3	2	0	0	0	0	4	2
Arsenal	2005–06	Premier League	1	0	0	0	4	1	0	0	0	0	5	1
Arsenal	Total		1	0	1	0	7	3	0	0	0	0	9	3
Derby County (loan)	2006–07	Championship	35	7	2	3	2	1	—		0	0	39	11
Career total			36	7	3	3	9	4	0	0	0	0	48	14

== Notes ==
A. Soccerbase's stats for the match between Derby County and Birmingham City on 9 March 2007 fail to include appearances by substitutes for either side, one of whom was Lupoli. Therefore, until and unless they correct it, he should have one more appearance for Derby than given on his Soccerbase page.
