= Neil Mitchell (footballer) =

English footballer

Personal information
- Full name: Neil Nicholas Mitchell
- Date of birth: 7 November 1974 (age 51)
- Place of birth: Lytham St Annes, England
- Position: Midfielder

Senior career*
Years	Team	Apps	(Gls)
1991–1996	Blackpool	67	(8)
1995	→ Rochdale (loan)	4	(0)
1996	→ Southport (loan)	?	(?)
1996–1998	Macclesfield Town	5	(0)
1998–1999	Morecambe	?	(?)
1999–2004	Chorley	?	(?)
- * Club domestic league appearances and goals

Neil Nicholas Mitchell (born 7 November 1974) is an English former professional footballer.

== Playing career ==
Mitchell, a central midfielder, began his career as a trainee with Blackpool in 1991. He remained at Bloomfield Road for five years, making 67 league appearances and scoring eight goals. He was sent on loan to Rochdale in the 1995–96 season where he made his debut on 9 December 1995 against Doncaster Rovers and made four appearances. In March 1996 he joined Southport on loan.

He signed for Sammy McIlroy's Macclesfield Town, who were then in the Conference in August 1996. The Silkmen won promotion to the Football League that season. However, after playing just five games for Macclesfield in two years, Mitchell moved back to the Lancashire coast with Morecambe, then in the Conference, on 9 February 1998. He also went on to play for Northern Premier League club Chorley.

== Post-retirement ==
Now retired from professional football Mitchell lives back on the Fylde coast where he coaches football at local schools with the YMCA, and also helps run Youth football tournaments each year.

He also plays Sunday League football, for Bloomfield Veterans FC, in the Blackpool & Fylde Sunday League Alliance Division One, since July 2004, along with fellow former Blackpool player, Andy Gouck. Mitchell also ran a successful 7-a-side league on a Monday night for many years.
