= Andy Gouck =

English footballer

Personal information
- Full name: Andrew Scott Gouck
- Date of birth: 8 June 1972 (age 54)
- Place of birth: Blackpool, England
- Position: Midfielder

Senior career*
Years	Team	Apps	(Gls)
1990–1996	Blackpool	148	(22)
1996–1998	Rochdale	42	(5)
1998–2001	Southport	91	(4)
2001–2003	Morecambe	42	(4)
2003–2004	Accrington Stanley	26	(5)
2004–2005	Fleetwood Town	?	(?)
Total		315	(40)
- * Club domestic league appearances and goals

Andrew Scott Gouck (born 8 June 1972 in Blackpool, Lancashire) is an English former professional footballer who played as a midfielder.

== Playing career ==
In June 1988, Gouck started his career as a trainee at his hometown club, Blackpool. He played 148 league games, in which he scored 22 goals, and played four FA Cup games. He also captained the side on a few occasions.

In July 1996, Gouck moved to Rochdale. During two seasons at Spotland, he played 42 games and scored five goals. After two successful seasons with Rochdale, Gouck was released.

He then moved to Southport in the Conference National. He spent three seasons with the Sandgrounders, playing 90 league matches (plus 1 as sub) and scoring four goals, before being released in May 2001.

The same month he signed a two-year contract with fellow Conference National club, Morecambe, where he scored four goals in 42 appearances.

After a loan spell with Accrington Stanley then in the Northern Premier League in 2002, he signed permanently with the club in January 2003.

During his time with Stanley, he scored five league goals in 26 matches. In November 2003 he scored an injury-time goal for Stanley, by then in the Conference National, as they beat Third Division Huddersfield Town 1–0 in the first round of the 2003–04 FA Cup, live on the BBC. Later that month, however, Gouck was found guilty of drink driving in Blackpool, after he had narrowly avoided a head-on collision with a police car in the resort. He was twice the alcohol limit and he was banned from driving. In March 2004 he was hospitalised in Victoria Hospital, Blackpool, for five days suffering from viral pneumonia.

Gouck left Stanley in May 2004 and then had a spell with Fleetwood Town.

== Post-retirement ==
Gouck played much of his football career part-time while balancing a role as a social worker, a job he now does full-time.

Now retired from professional football he lives back in his hometown of Blackpool where he plays Sunday League football, for Bloomfield Veterans FC, in the Blackpool & Fylde Sunday League Alliance Division One, who he has played for since July 2006. The club are managed by his father, Duncan. His younger brother, Ross, also plays for the club, as does fellow former Blackpool player Neil Mitchell.

== Honours ==
Blackpool

- Division Four play-off winner: 1991-92
