= Chris Cornelly =

English footballer

Personal information
- Full name: Christopher Cornelly
- Date of birth: 7 July 1976 (age 50)
- Place of birth: Huddersfield, England
- Position: Midfielder

Senior career*
Years	Team	Apps	(Gls)
1995–2000	Lower Hopton		
–1999	Ossett Albion		
1999–2002	Ashton United		
2002	Leigh RMI	3	(0)
2002–2005	Lincoln City	16	(0)
2004–2005	→ Stamford (loan)		
2005–2006	Ashton United		
2005–2006	Radcliffe Borough		
- Marsden
2010–2011	Ossett Albion		
- * Club domestic league appearances and goals as of 09:05, 26 May 2011 (UTC)

Christopher Cornelly (born 7 July 1976) is an English former professional footballer who played as a midfielder.

He played in the Football League for Lincoln City between 2002 and 2005, and spent the rest of his career in non-League football with clubs including Ossett Albion, Ashton United, Leigh RMI, Stamford and Radcliffe Borough.

== Playing career ==
On 12 December 2002, Cornelly joined Lincoln City agreeing a deal until the end of the 2002–03 season, making his Football League debut as a 61st-minute substitute for Simon Yeo in the club's 2–2 home draw with Cambridge United two days later.

He initially joined the club on a part-time basis, training once a week and maintaining his job as an installations manager for a CCTV company according to sources. but a successful run in the first team saw him offered a full-time professional contract for the 2003–04 season in April 2003, signing the deal the following month.

His final act for the club was to score the second goal in their 3–2 Lincolnshire Senior Cup final victory over Scunthorpe United at Glanford Park on 2 May 2005 before being one of seven players not retained at the end of the season.
