= Derek O'Connor (footballer, born 1978) =

Irish footballer

Personal information
- Date of birth: 9 March 1978 (age 48)
- Place of birth: Dublin, Ireland
- Position: Goalkeeper

Senior career*
Years	Team	Apps	(Gls)
1994	Crumlin United		
1994–1998	Huddersfield Town	1	(0)
1998–1999	Bradford Park Avenue		
1999–2000	Frickley Athletic		
2000–2001	St Patrick's Athletic		

International career
1997	Republic of Ireland U20	5	(0)
1998	Republic of Ireland U21	?	
- * Club domestic league appearances and goals

Derek Peter Luke O'Connor (born 9 March 1978) is an Irish professional footballer who played as a goalkeeper.

== Playing career ==
O'Connor began his career at Crumlin United and in 1994 he moved to Huddersfield Town in the youth ranks, which were supervised by Kevin Blackwell. He appeared on the subs bench during the 1994 Autoglass Windscreens Shield clash with Bradford City, he also subsequently appeared on the bench in the next game against Cambridge United, later on that season he was also on the bench against Bristol Rovers and Lincoln City. He then moved up into the first team professionally in 1995. He was retained by Brian Horton at the beginning of the 1995/96 season after Neil Warnock had resigned. He appeared on the squad picture for the 1996/97 season and appeared on the bench once during that season. During the summer he became Steve Francis's understudy following Tony Norman's retirement. He finally made his first-team debut in a League Cup match against Bradford City in 1997. He remained at Huddersfield until the end of season. After leaving Huddersfield, he then had a spell at non league Bradford Park Avenue and also played at Frickley Athletic. Having ended his football career, he began working for Grace Landscapes as a gardener in 2002.

== International ==
He has also played for the Ireland U-21 team. He also played in the Republic of Ireland under -20 team that won the bronze medal in the World Youth Championships in Malaysia in 1997. O'Connor was still getting selected for the under 21 team when he was playing non-league football with Bradford Park Avenue.

== Honours ==
Republic of Ireland

- FIFA World Youth Championship Third Place: 1997
