= Adam Reed (footballer, born 1975) =

English footballer

Personal information
- Full name: Adam Maurice Reed
- Date of birth: 18 February 1975 (age 51)
- Place of birth: Bishop Auckland, England
- Height: 6 ft 1 in (1.85 m)
- Position: Defender

Youth career
- 1990–1993: Darlington

Senior career*
Years	Team	Apps	(Gls)
1993–1995	Darlington	52	(1)
1995–1998	Blackburn Rovers	0	(0)
1997	→ Darlington (loan)	14	(0)
1997–1998	→ Rochdale (loan)	10	(0)
1998–2003	Darlington	94	(2)
2003–2011	Whitby Town		
- * Club domestic league appearances and goals

Adam Maurice Reed (born 18 February 1975) is an English former footballer who played in the Football League as a defender for Darlington, where he started and ended his career, and for Rochdale. During his first spell at Darlington he was voted both the supporters' and players' player of the season in 1994–95. A close season move to Blackburn Rovers for a fee of £200,000 followed when he became their first signing since they were crowned Premier League champions. During his three years at Ewood Park his only first team appearance was on the bench as a substitute in a League cup game at Preston. He had loan spells at Darlington and Rochdale before returning to Darlington permanently.
