= Keith Walker (footballer) =

Scottish footballer

Personal information
- Date of birth: 17 April 1966 (age 60)
- Place of birth: Edinburgh, Scotland
- Position: Defender

Senior career*
Years	Team	Apps	(Gls)
1984–1987	Stirling Albion	91	(17)
1987–1990	St Mirren	43	(6)
1989–1999	Swansea City	270	(9)
- Merthyr Tydfil
Total		404	(32)

Managerial career
- Merthyr Tydfil
- * Club domestic league appearances and goals

Keith Walker (born 17 April 1966) is a Scottish former footballer who played as a defender for Stirling Albion and St Mirren before playing in the Football League for Swansea City.
