= Mark Bailey (footballer) =

English footballer

Personal information
- Full name: Mark Bailey
- Date of birth: 12 August 1976 (age 50)
- Place of birth: Stoke-on-Trent, England
- Height: 5 ft 8 in (1.73 m)
- Position: Defender

Youth career
- 1992–1994: Stoke City

Senior career*
Years	Team	Apps	(Gls)
1994–1997	Stoke City	0	(0)
1996–1999	Rochdale	67	(1)
1999–2000	Winsford United		
1999–2000	Lancaster City		
1999–2001	Northwich Victoria	61	(2)
2001–2004	Lincoln City	98	(1)
2004–2006	Macclesfield Town	26	(2)
2006–2007	Peterborough United	0	(0)
2006–2007	Stafford Rangers	2	(0)
- * Club domestic league appearances and goals

Mark Bailey (born 12 August 1976) is an English former professional footballer who played as a defender.

He notably played in the Football League for Rochdale, Lincoln City and Macclesfield Town as well as spells with Stoke City and Peterborough United that yielded no appearances. He also spent time in Non-league football with Winsford United, Lancaster City, Northwich Victoria and Stafford Rangers.

== Career ==
=== Early career ===
Bailey began his career as a trainee with his home town club Stoke City before moving to Rochdale on a free transfer in October 1996. He made his Football League debut for the club in the 1–0 away victory over Torquay United on 3 December 1996 and by the end of March had secured a regular birth in the first team. The 1997–98 season saw Bailey maintain his presence in the team, making 24 league starts with a further nine appearances from the substitutes bench. He began the 1998–99 season as a regular member of the first team but dropped to the bench at the beginning of October and drifted out of the first team picture in mid-December. In January 1999, he attracted the attention of Northwich Victoria's manager Mark Gardiner but a proposed loan move was thwarted by Bailey sustaining a minor hamstring injury. He managed to break back into the Rochdale team in March 1999, making his first league start in nearly four months in the 0–0 home draw with Barnet on 20 March 1999. However, he made only three further appearances before being released by the club at the end of the season.

He commenced the 1999–2000 season training with Northwich Victoria from where he was recommended to Winsford United, debuting for the club in the 0–0 Northern Premier League draw at Spennymoor United on 21 August 1999, scoring his first goal for the club in the 2–2 draw at Whitby Town a week later. He moved on to join Lancaster City in November 1999, debuting in the 4–1 away Northern Premier League defeat to Hyde United on 12 November 1999.

=== Northwich Victoria ===
Bailey continued to attract the attention of Northwich Victoria's manager Mark Gardiner and having turned down one offer to join the Vics to remain at the Giant Axe, Gardiner came back with an improved pay offer which coupled with the lure of moving nearer to home in the Stoke area proved too much for Bailey and he departed Lancaster City in January 2000. He made his Football Conference debut for the club in the 2–0 defeat at Altrincham on 3 January 2000 scoring his first goal for the club in the 3–1 victory at Welling United on 8 January 2000.

=== Lincoln City ===
In October 2001, Bailey joined Lincoln City signing a contract that would keep him at Sincil Bank until the summer of 2004.

=== Macclesfield Town ===
In June 2004, Macclesfield Town's manager Brian Horton announced that the club had agreed terms to sign Bailey with Bailey signing a one-year contract with the club following the end of his contract with Lincoln City. He debuted for the club in the 3–1 victory at Leyton Orient on 7 August 2004 and was an ever-present member of the side until he sustained a peroneal tendon tear in the 1–1 home draw with Cambridge United on 19 October 2004. The injury would keep Bailey out of action until the 2–0 away defeat to Swansea City on 25 March 2005 but after that he remained in the first team picture for the remainder of the season as Macclesfield reached the play-offs, losing out to his former club Lincoln City in the semi-finals. He agreed a new one-year contract for the 2005–06 season but a series of injuries, particularly to his achilles, restricted his appearances and in April 2006 he left the club by mutual consent.

=== Peterborough United and Stafford Rangers ===
In August 2006 he joined up with Keith Alexander for a third time, signing a month-to-month contract with Peterborough United.

== Personal life ==
He is the son of the former Port Vale player Terry Bailey.

== Career statistics ==
Club	Season	League			FA Cup		League Cup		Other		Total	
Club	Season	Division	Apps	Goals	Apps	Goals	Apps	Goals	Apps	Goals	Apps	Goals
Stoke City	1994–95	First Division	0	0	0	0	0	0	0	0	0	0
Rochdale	1996–97	Third Division	15	0	1	0	0	0	1	0	17	0
Rochdale	1997–98	Third Division	33	0	0	0	2	0	2	0	37	0
Rochdale	1998–99	Third Division	19	1	0	0	2	0	1	0	22	1
Rochdale	Total		67	1	1	0	4	0	4	0	76	1
Northwich Victoria	1999–2000	Football Conference	15	1	0	0	0	0	0	0	15	1
Northwich Victoria	2000–01	Football Conference	31	2	4	0	0	0	2	0	37	2
Northwich Victoria	2001–02	Football Conference	13	0	0	0	0	0	0	0	13	0
Northwich Victoria	Total		59	3	4	0	0	0	2	0	65	3
Lincoln City	2001–02	Third Division	18	0	2	0	0	0	1	0	21	0
Lincoln City	2002–03	Third Division	45	0	1	0	1	0	3	1	50	1
Lincoln City	2003–04	Third Division	35	1	1	0	0	0	4	2	40	3
Lincoln City	Total		98	1	4	0	1	0	8	3	111	4
Macclesfield Town	2004–05	League Two	21	2	0	0	1	0	3	0	25	2
Macclesfield Town	2005–06	League Two	5	0	1	0	0	0	1	0	7	0
Macclesfield Town	Total		26	2	1	0	1	0	4	0	32	2
Career total			250	7	10	0	6	0	18	3	284	10
