= Mark Gardiner =

English footballer (born 1966)

Personal information
- Full name: Mark Christopher Gardiner
- Date of birth: 25 December 1966 (age 59)
- Place of birth: Cirencester, England
- Height: 5 ft 10 in (1.78 m)
- Position: Midfielder

Senior career*
Years	Team	Apps	(Gls)
1983–1987	Swindon Town	10	(1)
1987–1988	Torquay United	49	(4)
1988–1995	Crewe Alexandra	193	(35)
1995	→ Chester City (loan)	3	(0)
1996–1997	Fredrikstad	16	(3)
1997–1998	Macclesfield Town	7	(2)
1997–2000	Northwich Victoria	8	(1)
2000–2001	Leek Town		
2001–2004	Nantwich Town		(14)
Total		270	(43)

Managerial career
- 1998–2000: Northwich Victoria
- 2000–2005: Leek Town
- * Club domestic league appearances and goals

Mark Christopher Gardiner (born 25 December 1966) is an English former professional footballer who made 262 appearances in the Football League. He could play effectively at either left-back or left-wing.

== Career ==
Gardiner was born in Cirencester. He began his career as an apprentice with Swindon Town, making his league debut while still an apprentice in a 1–1 draw against Mansfield Town at the County Ground in April 1984. He turned professional in September 1984, making 10 league appearances, scoring 1 goal for the Robins.

He joined Torquay United on a free transfer in February 1987 (as part of the deal taking Phil King to Swindon_ and was plunged straight into the relegation battle, which would eventually see Torquay survive on the last day of the season and Lincoln City relegated to the Conference. The following season, Gardiner remained a regular in the resurgent Torquay side, scoring a spectacular winner away to Bolton Wanderers (only to be given a roasting by then manager Cyril Knowles as he was supposed to have aimed for the corner-flag as Torquay held on for a draw).

In August 1988 Gardiner left for Crewe Alexandra, again on a free transfer, after making 49 league appearances for the Gulls, scoring 4 goals in the process. At Crewe he helped the Railwaymen to promotion from the bottom flight in both 1989 and 1994. After a spell on loan to Chester City in March 1995, in which he played 3 league games, he left Crewe for a short spell in Norway with Fredrikstad F.K., returning to the UK to become a postman in Crewe.

He joined Macclesfield Town in October 1995, where he continued to fit in his postal duties with full-time training. Gardiner was a member of the team that helped Macclesfield to promotion to the Football League, though he only made 7 league appearances, scoring twice, in that debut season. In December 1997, he moved to Northwich Victoria, scoring the winning goal on his Conference debut against Stalybridge Celtic on 25 December. In November 1998, Northwich manager Phil Wilson was sacked with the Vics in 12th place in the Conference. Gardiner took over as caretaker manager, his first game in charge bringing a 3–0 home win over Welling United. He was confirmed as manager that December, and led Northwich to 7th in the Conference and to the last eight of the FA Trophy.

The following season was a struggle, Northwich flirted with relegation, finally finishing 18th, and were knocked out of the FA Trophy by Runcorn in the 2nd Round. On 3 October 2000, with Northwich bottom of the Conference with only 9 points from 12 games, Gardiner was sacked, joining Leek Town as a player, making his debut in a draw at Altrincham. Within a fortnight of Gardiner signing for Leek, Andy Holmes was sacked as Leek manager and on 3 November 2000, Gardiner was given his job. However, with Leek desperately short of money and struggling in the league, it was never going to be an easy task. In January 2001, Gardiner was told to cut the wage bill after having his budget cut and promptly resigned. He almost immediately joined Nantwich Town as a player, making his debut at left-back in a 2–0 win over Ramsbottom United. He was still playing for Nantwich in 2004.

In 2006 Gardiner had a brief spell in the TC Exiles squad which played in the Cirencester District Division 2. He led them to a final in which they ran out 2–1 to a last minute winner. Exiles soon folded and, with a string of injuries, Gardiner retired from play.

== Honours ==
Crewe Alexandra

- Football League Fourth Division third-place promotion: 1988–89
