= Steven Cann =

South African-born Welsh footballer

Personal information
- Full name: Steven Cann
- Date of birth: 20 January 1988 (age 38)
- Place of birth: South Africa
- Position: Goalkeeper

Team information
- Current team: Trethomas Bluebirds
- Number: 1

Youth career
- Derby County

Senior career*
Years	Team	Apps	(Gls)
2006–2007	Derby County	0	(0)
2007–2009	Rotherham United	2	(0)
2009–2012	Aberystwyth Town	92	(0)
2012–2014	Carmarthen Town	53	(0)
2014–2016	Port Talbot Town	57	(0)
2016–2017	Briton Ferry Llansawel		
2017–2020	Afan Lido		
2020–2021	Briton Ferry Llansawel		
2021	Merthyr Town		
2022	Pontypridd United	7	(0)
2022–2024	Afan Lido	7	(0)
2024–2026	Morriston Town	66	(0)
2026–	Trethomas Bluebirds	5	(0)

International career^{‡}
2004	Wales U17	3	(0)
2006	Wales U19	1	(0)
2009–	Wales Semi-Pro	5	(0)
- * Club domestic league appearances and goals as of 12:10, 29 August 2026 (UTC) ‡ National team caps and goals as of 08:43, 14 October 2010 (UTC)

Steven Cann (born 20 January 1988) is a South African-born Welsh footballer who plays for Cymru South side Trethomas Bluebirds.

== Club career ==
Having started his career at Derby County, Cann was released in June 2007. After his release by Derby, Cann joined Rotherham United on 31 July 2007, after impressing in a trial. He played his first game for the Millers in a 3-0 FA Cup loss to Aldershot Town. In his next game for the Millers, in the Football League Trophy Northern Semi-Final against Darlington, Cann saved 2 penalties in a 4–2 shoot out win, including saving one with his groin, enabling the Millers to progress to the Northern Final.

Cann was released by Rotherham at the end of the 2008–09 season, joining Welsh Premier League side Aberystwyth Town, making his debut in a 4–0 win over Caersws on the opening day of the season. Having previously been with the club on a non-contract basis, Cann signed a permanent contract with Aberystwyth on 4 December 2009. Manager Alan Morgan praised Cann's form stating: "Steve, in my eyes, is the best goalkeeper in the Welsh Premier." In his first year with the club, Cann made 29 league appearances before an injury ruled him out for the final month of the season.

Following a two-season spell with Carmarthen Town, Cann joined fellow Welsh Premier League outfit Port Talbot Town.

== International career ==
Cann has represented Wales Under 19 and was called to the under 19 squad for the 2006 Milk Cup. He is eligible to play for three countries Wales, South Africa and England.

On 8 September 2009, Cann made his debut for the Wales semi-professional side as a substitute during a 2–1 defeat to Poland.
