= Paul Dalton =

English footballer

Personal information
- Date of birth: 25 April 1967 (age 59)
- Place of birth: Middlesbrough, England
- Height: 5 ft 11 in (1.80 m)
- Position: Winger

Youth career
- 1986–1988: Brandon United
- 1988–1989: Manchester United

Senior career*
Years	Team	Apps	(Gls)
1989–1992	Hartlepool United	151	(37)
1992–1995	Plymouth Argyle	98	(25)
1995–2000	Huddersfield Town	98	(25)
1999	→ Carlisle United (loan)	3	(1)
2000–2001	Gateshead	26	(6)
Total		376	(94)
- * Club domestic league appearances and goals

Paul Dalton (born 25 April 1967) is an English former footballer who played as a winger in the Football League for Hartlepool United, Plymouth Argyle, Huddersfield Town and Carlisle United.

== Playing career ==
Born in Middlesbrough, Dalton started his career at non-league Brandon United, before moving to the academy of Manchester United in 1988. He never played a first team game for them and was sold to Hartlepool United a year later for a fee of £20,000.

Dalton made over 150 appearances for the Pool, before he was sold to Plymouth Argyle for £250,000 in 1992, a substantial fee at the time. He averaged more than a goal every four games for the Pilgrims, making 116 appearances in all competitions, scoring 32 goals. He scored 12 league goals in the 1993–94 season as the club narrowly missed out on a return to the second tier of English football under Peter Shilton. His spell at Home Park came to an end in the summer of 1995 when Huddersfield Town purchased him for £125,000.

Dalton initially struggled to settle at the Alfred McAlpine Stadium, but eventually found his feet, becoming Town's top scorer in the 1996–97 season. He had a short loan spell at Carlisle United in 1999, before leaving to join non-league Gateshead.

Dalton is remembered as one of Plymouth Argyle's best ever wingers and his face is among many ex-players displayed on murals at the club's Home Park stadium.
