= Jeremy Illingworth =

English footballer

Personal information
- Date of birth: 20 May 1977 (age 49)
- Place of birth: Huddersfield, England
- Position: Midfielder

Youth career
- Huddersfield Town

Senior career*
Years	Team	Apps	(Gls)
1994–1998	Huddersfield Town	3	(0)
- Wisbech Town
1999–2001	Ashton United	103	(29)
2001	Altrincham	15	(1)
2001–2003	Stocksbridge Park Steels	91	(17)
2003–2006	Guiseley		
2006	Bradford Park Avenue		
2008	A.F.C. Emley	4	(1)
- * Club domestic league appearances and goals

Jeremy Marcus Illingworth (born 20 May 1977) is an English former professional footballer who played as a midfielder in the Football League for Huddersfield Town. He began his career as a trainee with his home-town club, then, after trials at clubs including Cambridge United, went on to forge a lengthy career in non-league football with Wisbech Town, Ashton United, where he scored 29 goals from 103 games in all competitions, Altrincham (1 from 15), Stocksbridge Park Steels (17 from 91), Guiseley, Bradford Park Avenue and A.F.C. Emley.
