= Chris Hurst (footballer) =

English footballer (born 1974)

Personal information
- Full name: Christopher Mark Hurst
- Date of birth: 3 October 1973 (age 53)
- Place of birth: Barnsley, England
- Position: Midfielder

Senior career*
Years	Team	Apps	(Gls)
1996–1997	Emley		
1997–1998	Huddersfield Town	4	(0)
1997	→ Halifax Town (loan)	3	(0)
1998–1999	Emley		
1999–2000	Ilkeston Town		
2000–2001	Frickley Athletic		
2001–2005	Gainsborough Trinity		
2005–2006	Worksop Town		
2005–2006	→ Ossett Town (loan)		
2006–200x	Ossett Town		
- * Club domestic league appearances and goals

Christopher Mark Hurst (born 3 October 1974 in Barnsley) is an English former professional footballer who played in the Football League as a midfielder for Huddersfield Town, making four appearances in the 1997-98 season before returning to non-league football.

He also played non-league football for Emley, Halifax Town, Ilkeston Town, Frickley Athletic, Gainsborough Trinity, Worksop Town, and Ossett Town.

Hurst's younger brother Glynn also played professional football.
