= Michael Midwood =

English footballer and manager

Personal information
- Full name: Michael Adrian Midwood
- Date of birth: 19 April 1976 (age 50)
- Place of birth: Burnley, England
- Position: Striker

Senior career*
Years	Team	Apps	(Gls)
1993–1995	Huddersfield Town	0	(29)
1995	→ Macclesfield Town (loan)	7	(2)
1995–1997	Halifax Town	47	(11)
1996	→ Accrington Stanley (loan)	4	(2)
1997	→ Happy Valley (loan)		(7)
1997–1998	Huddersfield Town	1	(0)
1997	→ Glentoran (loan)	4	(0)
1998	Halifax Town	5	(0)
1998	Emley	0	(0)
1998	Doncaster Rovers	0	(29)
1998–1999	Happy Valley		(11)
1999–2000	Instant-Dict		(3)
2001–2002	Ossett Town		
2002–2006	Farsley Celtic		
2006–2007	Stainland United		
- * Club domestic league appearances and goals

Michael Adrian Midwood (born 19 April 1976) is an English former professional footballer who played as a striker in the Football League for Huddersfield Town, and in the Hong Kong First Division League for Happy Valley and Instant-Dict.

He also played non-League football for clubs including Halifax Town. He is now manager of Ealandians A.F.C.
