= Marcus Browning =

Footballer (born 1971)

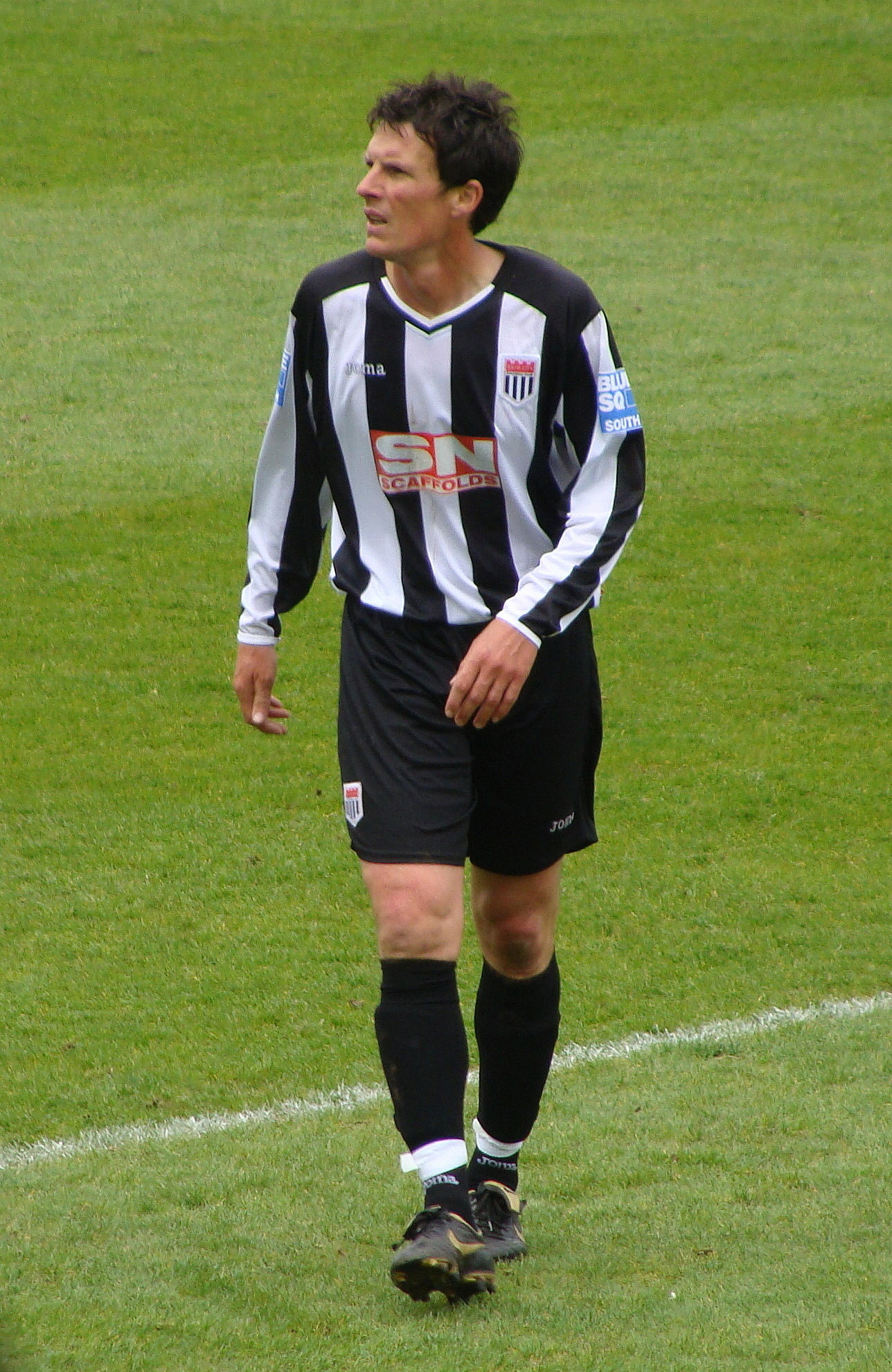
- Browning playing for Bath City in 2010

Personal information
- Full name: Marcus Trevor Browning
- Date of birth: 22 April 1971 (age 55)
- Place of birth: Bristol, England
- Position: Midfielder

Senior career*
| Years | Team | Apps | (Gls) |
| 1989–1997 | Bristol Rovers | 174 | (13) |
| 1989 | → Gloucester City (loan) | | |
| 1990 | → Weymouth (loan) | | |
| 1991 | → Gloucester City (loan) | | |
| 1992 | → Hereford United (loan) | 7 | (5) |
| 1997–1999 | Huddersfield Town | 33 | (0) |
| 1998 | → Gillingham (loan) | 1 | (0) |
| 1999–2002 | Gillingham | 77 | (3) |
| 2002–2007 | AFC Bournemouth | 188 | (3) |
| 2007–2009 | Weymouth | 21 | (0) |
| 2009–2010 | Bath City | | |
| 2010 | Poole Town | | |

International career
| 1996–1997 | Wales | 5 | (0) |
- * Club domestic league appearances and goals

Marcus Trevor Browning (born 22 April 1971) is a football coach and former player who played as a midfielder. Born in England, he made five appearances for the Wales national team.

== Club career ==
Browning was born in Bristol and began his career at Bristol Rovers as a striker but was converted to a defensive midfielder by his manager Malcolm Allison. He made over 200 appearances in all competitions for the club before joining Huddersfield Town for £500,000 in February 1997 on a three-and-a-half-year contract.

Browning then spent three years at Gillingham, whom he joined for £200,000 in March 1999 following a brief loan spell with the club after falling out of favour at Huddersfield Town under manager Peter Jackson. During his time with the Kent side he featured in their most successful ever FA Cup run as they made the quarter-finals before losing to Chelsea 5–0, as well as their promotion via the play-offs to the second tier of English football for the first time in their history.

He then joined AFC Bournemouth on a free transfer in 2002. Within a few months of his Bournemouth career he had to play in goal twice when on both occasions goalkeeper Chris Tardif had to go off injured. The first such occasion was a League Cup tie against Brentford which they went on to lose on penalties, and the second was a league match against Hull City which finished 0–0. Browning played the full 90 minutes as Bournemouth defeated Lincoln City 5–2 in the 2003 Football League Third Division play-off final. While still with Bournemouth Browning explored the possibility of becoming a professional referee after his playing career, making his debut as an official in a Bournemouth Sunday League Division Seven fixture in January 2006 and expressing a desire to one day officiate in the Premier League. He was released by Bournemouth in May 2007.

== International career ==
Browning made five appearances for the Wales national team, for whom he qualified via a Tredegar-born grandmother. He made his debut as a 57th minute substitute in a 3–0 away friendly loss to Italy in January 1996 and would go on to feature in three games of Wales' ill-fated qualification campaign for the 1998 World Cup, including two victories over San Marino and a home defeat to the Netherlands. His last appearance came in a 1–0 friendly victory over Scotland in Kilmarnock in May 1997.

== Coaching career ==
In July 2007, Browning joined up with former Bournemouth teammate Jason Tindall as part of the backroom staff at then Conference National team Weymouth. Over two seasons at Weymouth, he played 21 games.

In June 2009, it was agreed in principle that Weymouth would come to a settlement over paying out the year Browning had left on his current contract as new Weymouth manager Matty Hale had brought in his own backroom staff. After leaving Weymouth, he signed for Bath City, making his debut in a 4–3 defeat to Chelmsford City.

On 5 November 2009, it was confirmed that Browning had returned to Dean Court as a youth coach. Browning, who made more than 200 appearances for the club between 2002 and 2007, works with the U18s on a part-time basis, his appointment funded with the help of Brockenhurst College, while continuing playing, initially with Bath City in the Conference South, and from December 2010 with Poole Town. He later took on the role of U18s coach at Poole Town.

== Honours ==
Gillingham

- Football League Second Division play-offs: 2000

AFC Bournemouth

- Football League Third Division play-offs: 2003

Bath City

- Conference South play-offs: 2010
