= 2001–02 Brighton & Hove Albion F.C. season =

2001–02 season of Brighton & Hove Albion

Brighton & Hove Albion
2001–02 season
- Chairman: Dick Knight
- Manager: Micky Adams (until 10 October); Peter Taylor (from 17 October)
- Stadium: Withdean Stadium
- Second Division: 1st (promoted)
- FA Cup: Third round
- Worthington Cup: Second round
- LDV Vans Trophy: Southern Area Quarter finals
- Top goalscorer: League: Zamora (28); All: Zamora (32)
- Highest home attendance: 6,870 vs Swindon Town (13 Apr 2002, Second Division)
- Lowest home attendance: 3,237 vs Wycombe Wanderers (30 Oct 2001, LDV Vans Trophy)
- Average home league attendance: 6,598

During the 2001–02 English football season, Brighton & Hove Albion F.C. competed in the Football League Second Division.

== Season summary ==
In October 2001, Brighton boss Adams left the club to work as Dave Bassett's assistant at Leicester City, being replaced by former Leicester manager Peter Taylor. The transition proved to be a plus point for Brighton, who maintained their good form and ended the season as Division Two champions – winning a second successive promotion.

== Final league table ==
Pos	Team	Pld	W	D	L	GF	GA	GD	Pts	Promotion or relegation
1	Brighton & Hove Albion (C, P)	46	25	15	6	66	42	+24	90	Promotion to Football League First Division
2	Reading (P)	46	23	15	8	70	43	+27	84	Promotion to Football League First Division
3	Brentford	46	24	11	11	77	43	+34	83	Qualification for the Second Division play-offs
4	Cardiff City	46	23	14	9	75	50	+25	83	Qualification for the Second Division play-offs
5	Stoke City (O, P)	46	23	11	12	67	40	+27	80	Qualification for the Second Division play-offs

Rules for classification: In the Football League goals scored (GF) takes precedence over goal difference (GD).
(C) Champions; (O) Play-off winners; (P) Promoted

== Results ==
Brighton & Hove Albion's score comes first

=== Legend ===
Win	Draw	Loss

=== Football League Second Division ===
Date	Opponent	Venue	Result	Attendance	Scorers
11 August 2001	Cambridge United	A	0–0	4,509	
18 August 2001	Wigan Athletic	H	2–1	6,518	Zamora (pen), Steele
25 August 2001	Tranmere Rovers	A	0–0	8,162	
27 August 2001	Blackpool	H	4–0	6,696	Oatway, Carpenter, Steele, Zamora
31 August 2001	Northampton Town	A	0–2	5,408	
8 September 2001	Queens Park Rangers	H	2–1	6,820	Zamora, Watson
14 September 2001	Wrexham	A	2–1	3,434	Zamora (2, 1 pen)
18 September 2001	Stoke City	H	1–0	6,627	Watson
22 September 2001	Bournemouth	H	2–1	6,714	Watson, Howe (own goal)
25 September 2001	Wycombe Wanderers	A	1–1	7,097	Jones
29 September 2001	Cardiff City	A	1–1	12,022	Zamora
5 October 2001	Brentford	H	1–2	6,823	Steele
13 October 2001	Huddersfield Town	A	2–1	10,727	Zamora, Hart
20 October 2001	Oldham Athletic	H	3–0	6,793	Rogers, Steele (2)
23 October 2001	Notts County	A	2–2	5,092	Hart, Zamora
27 October 2001	Colchester United	H	1–0	6,531	Zamora
3 November 2001	Bristol City	A	1–0	13,955	Zamora
10 November 2001	Port Vale	H	1–0	6,648	Zamora
21 November 2001	Peterborough United	H	1–1	6,547	Zamora (pen)
24 November 2001	Swindon Town	A	1–1	8,830	Zamora
1 December 2001	Bury	A	2–0	3,782	Brooker, Zamora
21 December 2001	Chesterfield	H	2–2	6,371	Zamora, Steele
26 December 2001	Queens Park Rangers	A	0–0	16,412	
29 December 2001	Blackpool	A	2–2	5,419	Steele, Jones
12 January 2002	Wigan Athletic	A	0–3	6,203	
19 January 2002	Cambridge United	H	4–3	6,575	Hart, Zamora (3, 1 pen)
21 January 2002	Chesterfield	A	2–1	4,689	Zamora (2)
24 January 2002	Brentford	A	0–4	7,475	
31 January 2002	Cardiff City	H	1–0	6,117	Zamora (pen)
5 February 2002	Tranmere Rovers	H	1–0	6,279	Hart
9 February 2002	Oldham Athletic	A	0–2	6,951	
11 February 2002	Reading	H	3–1	6,756	Zamora, Melton, Lewis
16 February 2002	Huddersfield Town	H	1–0	6,744	Lewis
23 February 2002	Wrexham	H	0–0	6,649	
26 February 2002	Bournemouth	A	1–1	6,337	Brooker
1 March 2002	Stoke City	A	1–3	16,092	Steele
5 March 2002	Wycombe Wanderers	H	4–0	6,398	Zamora (2), Brooker, Watson
9 March 2002	Reading	A	0–0	22,009	
12 March 2002	Northampton Town	H	2–0	6,363	Zamora, Morgan
16 March 2002	Bury	H	2–1	6,609	Kenny (own goal), Zamora (pen)
23 March 2002	Notts County	H	2–2	6,538	Zamora, Webb
30 March 2002	Colchester United	A	4–1	4,881	Carpenter (2), Gray, Brooker
1 April 2002	Bristol City	H	2–1	6,759	Lewis, Steele
6 April 2002	Peterborough United	A	1–0	8,321	Zamora
13 April 2002	Swindon Town	H	0–0	6,870	
20 April 2002	Port Vale	A	1–0	8,812	Watson

=== FA Cup ===
Round	Date	Opponent	Venue	Result	Attendance	Goalscorers
R1	17 November 2001	Shrewsbury Town	H	1–0	5,450	Zamora
R2	8 December 2001	Rushden & Diamonds	H	2–1	5,647	Zamora, Cullip
R3	15 January 2002	Preston North End	H	0–2	6,548	

=== League Cup ===
Round	Date	Opponent	Venue	Result	Attendance	Goalscorers
R1	21 August 2001	Wimbledon	H	2–1	6,344	Zamora (2)
R2	11 September 2001	Southampton	H	0–3	6,489	

=== LDV Vans Trophy ===
Round	Date	Opponent	Venue	Result	Attendance	Goalscorers
R1 Southern Section	16 October 2001	Swansea City	A	2–1	2,851	Lehmann, Steele
R2 Southern Section	30 October 2001	Wycombe Wanderers	H	2–1 (a.e.t.)	3,237	Pitcher, Melton
QF Southern Section	4 December 2001	Cambridge United	A	1–2 (a.e.t.)	2,306	Melton

== Players ==
=== First-team squad ===
Squad at end of season

Note: Flags indicate national team as defined under FIFA eligibility rules; some limited exceptions apply. Players may hold more than one non-FIFA nationality.

No.	Pos.	Nation	Player
1	GK	NED	Michel Kuipers
2	DF	ENG	Paul Watson
3	DF	ENG	Kerry Mayo
4	DF	ENG	Danny Cullip
5	DF	ENG	Simon Morgan
6	MF	ENG	Junior Lewis (on loan from Leicester City)
7	MF	ENG	Geoff Pitcher
8	MF	ENG	Paul Rogers
9	FW	ENG	Gary Hart
10	MF	ENG	Charlie Oatway
11	MF	ENG	Paul Brooker
12	MF	ENG	Richard Carpenter
14	FW	ENG	Lee Steele
15	DF	WAL	Nathan Jones
16	FW	ENG	Wayne Gray (on loan from Wimbledon)

No.	Pos.	Nation	Player
17	MF	ENG	Phil Hadland
18	GK	ENG	Will Packham
19	MF	ENG	Dan Harding
20	MF	ENG	Steve Melton
21	FW	ENG	Dan Marney
22	DF	ENG	Adam Virgo
23	MF	ENG	David Lee
24	MF	ENG	Shaun Wilkinson
25	FW	ENG	Bobby Zamora
26	DF	ENG	Robbie Pethick
27	MF	ENG	Dean Hammond
28	MF	ENG	Chris McPhee
29	GK	ENG	John Keeley
30	FW	ENG	Daniel Webb (on loan from Southend United)
31	GK	AUS	Chris Jones

=== Left club during season ===
Note: Flags indicate national team as defined under FIFA eligibility rules; some limited exceptions apply. Players may hold more than one non-FIFA nationality.

No.	Pos.	Nation	Player
19	FW	ENG	Darren Freeman (to Margate)
6	DF	ENG	Andy Crosby (to Oxford United)
23	DF	ENG	Matthew Wicks (to Hull City)

No.	Pos.	Nation	Player
17	FW	ENG	Scott Ramsay (to Dover Athletic)
16	FW	GER	Dirk Lehmann (to Motherwell)
31	GK	ENG	Simon Royce (on loan from Leicester City)
