= 2002–03 Brighton & Hove Albion F.C. season =

2002–03 season of Brighton & Hove Albion

Brighton & Hove Albion
2002–03 season
- Manager: Steve Coppell
- Football League First Division: 23rd
- FA Cup: Third Round
- League Cup: Second Round
Home colours

The 2002–03 season saw Brighton & Hove Albion compete in the Football League First Division where they finished in 23rd position with 45 points and were relegated to the Second Division.

== Final league table ==
Pos	Team	Pld	W	D	L	GF	GA	GD	Pts	Promotion or relegation
20	Coventry City	46	12	14	20	46	62	−16	50	
21	Stoke City	46	12	14	20	45	69	−24	50	
22	Sheffield Wednesday (R)	46	10	16	20	56	73	−17	46	Relegation to 2003–04 Second Division
23	Brighton & Hove Albion (R)	46	11	12	23	49	67	−18	45	Relegation to 2003–04 Second Division
24	Grimsby Town (R)	46	9	12	25	48	85	−37	39	Relegation to 2003–04 Second Division

Updated to match(es) played on 11 May 2003. Source: Soccerway
Rules for classification: 1) points; 2) goal difference; 3) number of goals scored.
(R) Relegated

== Results ==
Brighton & Hove Albion's score comes first

=== Legend ===
Win	Draw	Loss

=== Football League First Division ===
Match	Date	Opponent	Venue	Result	Attendance	Scorers
1	10 August 2002	Burnley	A	3–1	14,738	Melton, Brooker, Zamora
2	13 August 2002	Coventry City	H	0–0	6,816	
3	17 August 2002	Norwich City	H	0–2	6,730	
4	24 August 2002	Wimbledon	A	0–1	2,522	
5	26 August 2002	Walsall	H	0–2	6,519	
6	31 August 2002	Portsmouth	A	2–4	19,031	Cullip, Brooker
7	7 September 2002	Millwall	A	0–1	8,822	
8	14 September 2002	Gillingham	H	2–4	6,733	Carpenter, Hart
9	17 September 2002	Stoke City	H	1–2	6,369	Carpenter
10	21 September 2002	Rotherham United	A	0–1	6,696	
11	28 September 2002	Grimsby Town	H	1–2	6,547	Zamora
12	5 October 2002	Watford	A	0–1	15,305	
13	19 October 2002	Sheffield United	H	2–4	6,810	Hart, Barrett
14	26 October 2002	Crystal Palace	A	0–5	21,769	
15	2 November 2002	Bradford City	H	3–2	6,319	Zamora (2), Rodger
16	11 November 2002	Wolverhampton Wanderers	A	1–1	23,016	Zamora
17	16 November 2002	Derby County	H	1–0	6,845	Mayo
18	23 November 2002	Preston North End	A	2–2	13,068	Rodger, Sidwell
19	27 November 2002	Nottingham Forest	A	2–3	29,137	Sidwell, Jones
20	30 November 2002	Reading	H	0–1	6,817	
21	7 December 2002	Sheffield Wednesday	A	1–1	18,008	Hart
22	10 December 2002	Ipswich Town	H	1–1	6,377	Zamora
23	14 December 2002	Derby County	A	0–1	25,789	
24	20 December 2002	Leicester City	H	0–1	6,592	
25	26 December 2002	Norwich City	A	1–0	20,687	Sidwell
26	28 December 2002	Burnley	H	2–2	6,502	Sidwell (2)
27	11 January 2003	Coventry City	A	0–0	15,951	
28	18 January 2003	Portsmouth	H	1–1	6,848	Zamora
29	1 February 2003	Walsall	A	0–1	8,413	
30	4 February 2003	Wimbledon	H	2–3	6,111	Brooker, Zamora
31	8 February 2003	Wolverhampton Wanderers	H	4–1	6,754	Brooker, Zamora, Hart, Blackwell
32	15 February 2003	Bradford City	A	1–0	11,520	Zamora
33	22 February 2003	Millwall	H	1–0	6,751	Rougier
34	1 March 2003	Gillingham	A	0–3	9,178	
35	5 March 2003	Stoke City	A	0–1	21,023	
36	8 March 2003	Rotherham United	H	2–0	6,468	Zamora, Hurst (o.g.)
37	15 March 2003	Nottingham Forest	H	1–0	6,830	Brooker
38	18 March 2003	Sheffield United	A	1–2	19,357	Carpenter
39	22 March 2003	Ipswich Town	A	2–2	26,078	Rougier, Marshall (o.g.)
40	25 March 2003	Crystal Palace	H	0–0	6,789	
41	4 April 2003	Reading	A	2–1	16,133	Brooker, Kitson
42	12 April 2003	Preston North End	H	0–2	6,669	
43	19 April 2003	Leicester City	A	0–2	31,909	
44	21 April 2003	Sheffield Wednesday	H	1–1	6,928	Zamora
45	26 April 2003	Watford	H	4–0	6,841	Zamora, Blackwell, Kitson, Oatway
46	4 May 2003	Grimsby Town	A	2–2	6,369	Zamora, Cullip

=== FA Cup ===
Match	Date	Opponent	Venue	Result	Attendance	Scorers
R3	14 January 2003	Norwich City	A	1–3	17,205	Pethick

=== Football League Cup ===
Match	Date	Opponent	Venue	Result	Attendance	Scorers
R1	11 September 2002	Exeter City	H	2–1	5,200	Wilkinson, Cullip
R2	24 September 2002	Ipswich Town	A	1–3	13,266	Hammond

== Squad statistics ==
No.	Pos.	Name	League		FA Cup		League Cup		Total	
No.	Pos.	Name	Apps	Goals	Apps	Goals	Apps	Goals	Apps	Goals
1	GK	(Netherlands) Michel Kuipers	21	0	1	0	0	0	22	0
2	DF	(England) Paul Watson	45	0	1	0	2	0	48	0
3	DF	(England) Kerry Mayo	41	1	1	0	1	0	43	1
4	DF	(England) Danny Cullip	44	2	1	0	2	1	47	3
5	DF	(England) Dean Blackwell	18(3)	2	0(1)	0	0	0	18(4)	2
6	DF	(England) Guy Butters	6	0	0	0	1	0	7	0
7	MF	(England) Geoff Pitcher	0	0	0	0	0	0	0	0
8	MF	(England) Paul Rogers	1(3)	0	0	0	0(1)	0	1(4)	0
9	FW	(England) Gary Hart	27(9)	4	0	0	1	0	28(9)	4
10	MF	(England) Charlie Oatway	18(11)	1	1	0	2	0	21(11)	1
11	MF	(England) Paul Brooker	32(5)	6	1	0	2	0	35(5)	6
12	MF	(England) Richard Carpenter	42(2)	3	1	0	2	0	45(2)	3
14	DF	(England) Robbie Pethick	25(1)	0	1	1	1	0	27(1)	1
13	GK	(England) Ben Roberts	3	0	0	0	0	0	3	0
15	DF	(Wales) Nathan Jones	16(12)	1	1	0	0(1)	0	17(13)	1
16	DF	(England) David Lee	0	0	0	0	0	0	0	0
17	MF	(England) Shaun Wilkinson	4(8)	0	0	0	1	1	5(8)	1
18	GK	(England) Will Packham	0	0	0(1)	0	0	0	0(1)	0
19	FW	(England) Dan Marney	6(6)	0	0	0	1	0	7(6)	0
20	DF	(Iceland) Ívar Ingimarsson	15	0	0	0	0	0	15	0
20	MF	(England) Steve Melton	6(2)	1	0	0	1(1)	0	7(3)	1
21	FW	(England) Chris McPhee	0(2)	0	0	0(2)	0	0	0(4)	0
22	DF	(England) Adam Virgo	3	0	0	0	1	0	4	0
23	MF	(England) Dean Hammond	1(3)	0	0	1	1	0	2(3)	1
24	DF	(England) Adam Hinshelwood	4(3)	0	0	0	0	0	4(3)	0
25	FW	(England) Bobby Zamora	35	14	1	0	0	0	36	14
26	DF	(England) Dan Harding	0(1)	0	0	0	0	0	0(1)	0
27	FW	(England) Paul Kitson	7(3)	2	0	0	0	0	7(3)	2
28	FW	(Republic of Ireland) Graham Barrett	20(10)	1	1	0	0	0	21(10)	1
29	MF	(England) John Piercy	1(3)	0	0(1)	0	1	0	2(4)	0
30	MF	(England) Simon Rodger	27(2)	2	0	0	0	0	27(2)	2
30	GK	(England) Andy Petterson	6(1)	0	0	0	2	0	8(1)	0
32	GK	(England) John Keeley	0	0	0	0	0	0	0	0
33	GK	(England) Dave Beasant	16	0	0	0	0	0	16	0
33	MF	(England) Steve Sidwell	11(1)	5	0	0	0	0	11(1)	5
34	DF	(England) Daniel Webb	0(3)	0	0	0	0	0	0(3)	0
34	MF	(Trinidad and Tobago) Tony Rougier	5(1)	2	0	0	0	0	5(1)	2
