= 1997–98 Fulham F.C. season =

Fulham F.C.
1997–98 season
- Chairman: Mohammed Al Fayed
- Manager: Micky Adams (until 25 September); Ray Wilkins (from 25 September to 3 May); Kevin Keegan (from 3 May)
- Second Division: 6th
- Play-offs: Semi-finals
- FA Cup: Third round
- League Cup: Second round
- Auto Windscreens Shield: Quarter finals
- Top goalscorer: Moody (15)
- Average home league attendance: 9,018

The 1997–98 season was Fulham's 100th season in professional football. They played in the Second Division (previously known as the Third Division).

== Season summary ==
Manager Micky Adams was sacked in September, soon after Mohammed Al Fayed's take-over. Ray Wilkins and Kevin Keegan were appointed as head coach and director of football respectively. The club managed to make the play-offs despite losing their last three games, but this wasn't good enough for Al Fayed, who sacked Wilkins and promoted Keegan to his position. Keegan was unable to navigate Fulham through the play-offs as they were defeated by Grimsby Town 2–1 on aggregate (1–1 and 1–0 over two legs) in the semi-finals.

== Final league table ==
Pos	Team	Pld	W	D	L	GF	GA	GD	Pts	Promotion or relegation
4	Northampton Town	46	18	17	11	52	37	+15	71	Qualification for the Second Division play-offs
5	Bristol Rovers	46	20	10	16	70	64	+6	70	Qualification for the Second Division play-offs
6	Fulham	46	20	10	16	60	43	+17	70	Qualification for the Second Division play-offs
7	Wrexham	46	18	16	12	55	51	+4	70	
8	Gillingham	46	19	13	14	52	47	+5	70	

Rules for classification: In the Football League goals scored (GF) takes precedence over goal difference (GD).

== Results ==
Fulham's score comes first

=== Legend ===
Win	Draw	Loss

=== Football League Second Division ===
Date	Opponent	Venue	Result	Attendance	Scorers
9 August 1997	Wrexham	H	1–0	8,789	Conroy
16 August 1997	Walsall	A	1–1	4,418	Keister (own goal)
23 August 1997	Luton Town	H	0–0	8,142	
30 August 1997	Wycombe Wanderers	A	0–2	6,278	
2 September 1997	Bristol City	A	2–0	10,293	Newhouse, Carpenter
9 September 1997	Plymouth Argyle	H	2–0	8,961	Moody (2)
13 September 1997	Grimsby Town	H	0–2	6,874	
20 September 1997	Southend United	A	0–1	5,026	
27 September 1997	Wigan Athletic	A	1–2	4,951	Hayward
4 October 1997	Oldham Athletic	H	3–1	8,805	Moody (2), Sinnott (own goal)
11 October 1997	Blackpool	H	1–0	7,760	Conroy
18 October 1997	Bournemouth	A	1–2	7,484	Vincent (own goal)
21 October 1997	Watford	A	0–2	11,486	
25 October 1997	Northampton Town	H	1–1	9,848	Peschisolido
1 November 1997	Chesterfield	H	1–1	7,998	Blake
4 November 1997	Millwall	A	1–1	10,291	Peschisolido
8 November 1997	Bristol Rovers	A	3–2	6,166	Carpenter, Scott (2)
18 November 1997	York City	H	1–1	5,521	Peschisolido
21 November 1997	Gillingham	H	3–0	8,274	Peschisolido (2), Watson
29 November 1997	Preston North End	A	1–3	9,723	Scott
2 December 1997	Brentford	H	1–1	10,767	Peschisolido
13 December 1997	Carlisle United	A	0–2	4,574	
19 December 1997	Burnley	H	1–0	5,096	Cullip
26 December 1997	Plymouth Argyle	A	4–1	9,469	Moody (2), Hayward, Trollope
28 December 1997	Bristol City	H	1–0	13,273	Moody
10 January 1998	Wrexham	A	3–0	5,338	Moody, Peschisolido, Trollope
17 January 1998	Wycombe Wanderers	H	0–0	10,468	
24 January 1998	Luton Town	A	4–1	8,366	Moody (3, 1 pen), Hayward
31 January 1998	Grimsby Town	A	1–1	6,785	Lightbourne
7 February 1998	Southend United	H	2–0	9,122	Peschisolido, Lightbourne
14 February 1998	Oldham Athletic	A	0–1	6,063	
21 February 1998	Wigan Athletic	H	2–0	7,791	Hayward, Peschisolido
24 February 1998	Bournemouth	H	0–1	7,708	
28 February 1998	Blackpool	A	1–2	5,183	Coleman
3 March 1998	Bristol Rovers	H	1–0	6,843	Thorpe
7 March 1998	Chesterfield	A	2–0	5,129	Morgan, Blake
14 March 1998	Millwall	H	1–2	12,318	Thorpe
21 March 1998	York City	A	1–0	4,871	Peschisolido
28 March 1998	Gillingham	A	0–2	10,507	
4 April 1998	Preston North End	H	2–1	8,814	Brazier, Collins
7 April 1998	Walsall	H	1–1	6,733	Trollope
11 April 1998	Brentford	A	2–0	10,510	Moody (2)
13 April 1998	Carlisle United	H	5–0	9,243	Peschisolido (3), Moody (pen), Thorpe
18 April 1998	Burnley	A	1–2	9,745	Moody
25 April 1998	Northampton Town	A	0–1	7,443	
2 May 1998	Watford	H	1–2	17,114	Beardsley

=== Second Division play-offs ===
Round	Date	Opponent	Venue	Result	Attendance	Goalscorers
SF 1st Leg	9 May 1998	Grimsby Town	H	1–1	13,954	Beardsley (pen)
SF 2nd Leg	13 May 1998	Grimsby Town	A	0–1 (lost 1–2 on agg)	8,689	

=== FA Cup ===
Round	Date	Opponent	Venue	Result	Attendance	Goalscorers
R1	16 November 1997	Margate	A	2–1	5,100	Carpenter, Scott
R2	6 December 1997	Southend United	H	1–0	8,537	Blake (pen)
R3	5 January 1998	Tottenham Hotspur	A	1–3	27,909	Smith

=== League Cup ===
Round	Date	Opponent	Venue	Result	Attendance	Goalscorers
R1 1st Leg	12 August 1997	Wycombe Wanderers	A	2–1	4,360	Newhouse, Conroy
R1 2nd Leg	26 August 1997	Wycombe Wanderers	H	4–4 (won 6–5 on agg)	5,055	Newhouse (2), Carpenter, Conroy
R2 1st Leg	16 September 1997	Wolverhampton Wanderers	H	0–1	5,933	
R2 2nd Leg	24 September 1997	Wolverhampton Wanderers	A	0–1 (lost 0–2 on agg)	17,862	

=== Football League Trophy ===
Round	Date	Opponent	Venue	Result	Attendance	Goalscorers
SR1	9 December 1997	Watford	H	1–0	3,364	Moody
SR2	13 January 1998	Wycombe Wanderers	H	3–1	4,319	Thomas (2), Freeman
SQF	27 January 1998	Luton Town	H	1–2	5,103	Lightbourne

== Players ==
=== First-team squad ===
Note: Flags indicate national team as defined under FIFA eligibility rules; some limited exceptions apply. Players may hold more than one non-FIFA nationality.

No.	Pos.	Nation	Player
—	GK	NIR	Maik Taylor (Note: Taylor was born in Hildesheim, West Germany, but qualified to represent any of the home nations internationally as he holds a British passport, and represented Northern Ireland at U-21 level before making his international debut for Northern Ireland in March 1999.)
—	GK	RSA	Andre Arendse
—	GK	WAL	Mark Walton
—	DF	ENG	Jimmy Aggrey
—	DF	ENG	Mark Blake
—	DF	ENG	Rufus Brevett
—	DF	ENG	Danny Cullip
—	DF	WAL	Chris Coleman
—	DF	ENG	Robbie Herrera
—	DF	ENG	Matt Lawrence
—	DF	IRL	Shaun Maher
—	DF	SCO	Steve McAnespie
—	DF	ENG	Simon Morgan
—	DF	GER	Alan Neilson (Note: Neilson was born in Wegberg, West Germany, but also qualified to represent Wales internationally and made his international debut for Wales in February 1992.)
—	DF	ENG	Rob Scott
—	DF	ENG	Simon Stewart
—	DF	ENG	Martin Thomas
—	DF	ENG	Paul Watson
—	MF	ENG	Paul Bracewell
—	MF	ENG	Matt Brazier
—	MF	ENG	Paul Brooker

No.	Pos.	Nation	Player
—	MF	ENG	Richard Carpenter
—	MF	ENG	Glenn Cockerill
—	MF	ENG	Wayne Collins
—	MF	ENG	Nick Cusack
—	MF	ENG	Sean Davis
—	MF	ENG	Steve Hayward
—	MF	NIR	Rod McAree
—	MF	ENG	Ian Selley
—	MF	ENG	Neil Smith
—	MF	WAL	Paul Trollope (Note: Trollope was born in Swindon, England, but also qualified to represent Wales internationally and made his international debut for Wales in May 1997.)
—	FW	ENG	Andy Arnott
—	FW	ENG	Peter Beardsley (on loan from Bolton Wanderers)
—	FW	ENG	Luke Cornwall
—	FW	SCO	Mike Conroy
—	FW	ENG	Darren Freeman
—	FW	BER	Kyle Lightbourne (on loan from Coventry City)
—	FW	ENG	Leon McKenzie (on loan from Crystal Palace)
—	FW	ENG	Paul Moody
—	FW	ENG	Aidan Newhouse
—	FW	CAN	Paul Peschisolido
—	FW	ENG	Tony Thorpe

== Transfers ==
=== In ===
Date	Pos.	Name	From	Fee
1 August 1997	DF	(England) Jimmy Aggrey	(England) Chelsea	Free transfer
1 August 1997	FW	(England) Andy Arnott	(England) Leyton Orient	£23,000
1 August 1997	MF	(England) Neil Smith	(England) Gillingham	Transfer
1 August 1997	GK	(South Africa) Andre Arendse	(South Africa) Cape Town Spurs	£200,000
1 August 1997	FW	(England) Paul Moody	(England) Oxford United	£200,000
1 August 1997	DF	(England) Ian McGuckin	(England) Hartlepool United	£75,000
1 August 1997	MF	(England) Steve Hayward	(England) Carlisle United	£175,000
10 October 1997	MF	(England) Paul Bracewell	(England) Sunderland	£75,000
17 October 1997	MF	(England) Ian Selley	(England) Arsenal	£500,000
24 October 1997	FW	(Canada) Paul Peschisolido	(England) West Bromwich Albion	£1,100,000
14 November 1997	GK	(England) Maik Taylor	(England) Southampton	£700,000
26 November 1997	DF	(Wales) Alan Neilson	(England) Southampton	£250,000
27 November 1997	MF	(Scotland) Steve McAnespie	(England) Bolton Wanderers	£100,000
27 November 1997	MF	(Wales) Paul Trollope	(England) Derby County	£600,000
1 December 1997	DF	(Wales) Chris Coleman	(England) Blackburn Rovers	£2,000,000
1 December 1997	MF	(Republic of Ireland) Shaun Maher	(Republic of Ireland) Bohemians	£35,000
22 January 1998	MF	(England) Wayne Collins	(England) Sheffield Wednesday	£400,000
30 January 1998	DF	(England) Rufus Brevett	(England) Queens Park Rangers	£375,000
26 February 1998	FW	(England) Tony Thorpe	(England) Luton Town	£800,000
20 March 1998	MF	(England) Matt Brazier	(England) Queens Park Rangers	£65,000

=== Out ===
Date	Pos.	Name	To	Fee
1 August 1997	DF	(England) Terry Angus	(England) Slough Town	Free transfer
1 August 1997	DF	(England) John Hamsher	(England) Rushden & Diamonds	Free transfer
1 August 1997	MF	(England) Michael Mison	(England) Rushden & Diamonds	Free transfer
31 October 1997	FW	(England) Aidan Newhouse	(Wales) Swansea City	£30,000
31 October 1997	MF	(England) Nick Cusack	(Wales) Swansea City	£50,000
7 November 1997	MF	(England) Glenn Cockerill	(England) Brentford	Free transfer
19 December 1997	DF	(England) Paul Watson	(England) Brentford	£50,000
6 February 1998	GK	(Wales) Mark Walton	(England) Gillingham	£40,000
18 February 1998	DF	(England) Danny Cullip	(England) Brentford	£75,000
26 March 1998	FW	(Scotland) Mike Conroy	(England) Blackpool	£50,000

Transfers in: ▼£7,473,000
Transfers out: ▲£295,000
Total spending: ▼£7,178,000
