= 1996–97 Fulham F.C. season =

Fulham
1996–97 season
- Chairman: Jimmy Hill
- Manager: Micky Adams (player-manager)
- Stadium: Craven Cottage
- Third Division: 2nd (promoted)
- FA Cup: First round
- League Cup: Second round
- Football League Trophy: First round
- Top goalscorer: League: Conroy (21); All: Conroy (23)
- Average home league attendance: 6,644

During the 1996–97 English football season, Fulham F.C. competed in the Division Three. It was their third season in the league's fourth tier, and they finished the season with their first promotion in 15 years.

== Season summary ==
In his first full season as manager, Micky Adams guided them to automatic promotion and as a result won the Division Three Manager of the Season award. They finished level on points at the top of the division with Wigan Athletic.

Fulham's previous promotion had been in 1982 when they were promoted from the old Third Division.

It was the first of three promotions in five seasons for the club, which saw them reach the FA Premier League in 2001 and end a 34-year exile from the top division of English football.

== Final league table ==
| Pos | Team | Pld | W | D | L | GF | GA | GD | Pts | Promotion or relegation |
|---|---|---|---|---|---|---|---|---|---|---|
| 1 | Wigan Athletic (C, P) | 46 | 26 | 9 | 11 | 84 | 51 | +33 | 87 | Promotion to the Second Division |
| 2 | Fulham (P) | 46 | 25 | 12 | 9 | 72 | 38 | +34 | 87 | Promotion to the Second Division |
| 3 | Carlisle United (P) | 46 | 24 | 12 | 10 | 67 | 44 | +23 | 84 | Promotion to the Second Division |
| 4 | Northampton Town (O, P) | 46 | 20 | 12 | 14 | 67 | 44 | +23 | 72 | Qualification for the Third Division play-offs |
| 5 | Swansea City | 46 | 21 | 8 | 17 | 62 | 58 | +4 | 71 | Qualification for the Third Division play-offs |

Rules for classification: In the Football League goals scored (GF) takes precedence over goal difference (GD).
(C) Champions; (O) Play-off winners; (P) Promoted

== Results ==
Fulham's score comes first

=== Legend ===
| Win | Draw | Loss |

=== Football League Third Division ===
| Date | Opponent | Venue | Result | Attendance | Scorers |
|---|---|---|---|---|---|
| 17 August 1996 | Hereford United | H | 1–0 | 5,277 | Conroy |
| 24 August 1996 | Hartlepool United | A | 1–2 | 2,457 | Scott |
| 27 August 1996 | Rochdale | A | 2–1 | 1,689 | Cusack, Conroy |
| 31 August 1996 | Carlisle United | H | 1–0 | 5,860 | Conroy |
| 7 September 1996 | Colchester United | H | 3–1 | 5,189 | Conroy (2), Morgan |
| 10 September 1996 | Exeter City | A | 1–0 | 2,388 | Freeman |
| 14 September 1996 | Swansea City | A | 2–1 | 3,791 | Conroy, Morgan |
| 21 September 1996 | Mansfield Town | H | 1–2 | 5,740 | Morgan |
| 28 September 1996 | Darlington | A | 2–0 | 3,269 | Watson, Carpenter |
| 1 October 1996 | Torquay United | H | 1–2 | 4,459 | Scott |
| 5 October 1996 | Northampton Town | A | 1–0 | 6,171 | Conroy |
| 12 October 1996 | Doncaster Rovers | H | 3–1 | 5,516 | Conroy, Herrera, Carpenter |
| 15 October 1996 | Cambridge United | H | 3–0 | 5,791 | Conroy (2), Blake (pen) |
| 19 October 1996 | Hull City | A | 3–0 | 3,986 | Freeman, Watson, Conroy |
| 26 October 1996 | Brighton & Hove Albion | A | 0–0 | 8,387 | |
| 29 October 1996 | Scunthorpe United | H | 2–1 | 4,566 | Conroy, Freeman |
| 2 November 1996 | Lincoln City | H | 1–2 | 6,945 | Carpenter |
| 9 November 1996 | Cardiff City | A | 2–1 | 6,144 | Conroy, Blake |
| 19 November 1996 | Barnet | H | 2–0 | 4,423 | Conroy, Morgan |
| 23 November 1996 | Wigan Athletic | A | 1–1 | 5,039 | Scott |
| 30 November 1996 | Brighton & Hove Albion | H | 2–0 | 8,279 | Conroy, Blake (pen) |
| 3 December 1996 | Chester City | A | 1–1 | 1,762 | Freeman |
| 14 December 1996 | Leyton Orient | H | 1–1 | 7,355 | Watson |
| 21 December 1996 | Scarborough | A | 2–0 | 2,015 | Conroy, Scott |
| 26 December 1996 | Exeter City | H | 1–1 | 7,892 | Angus |
| 11 January 1997 | Darlington | H | 6–0 | 5,735 | Scott, Carpenter, Cullip, Freeman, Brooker, Conroy |
| 14 January 1997 | Colchester United | A | 1–2 | 3,820 | Morgan |
| 18 January 1997 | Torquay United | A | 1–3 | 3,386 | Scott |
| 25 January 1997 | Scunthorpe United | A | 4–1 | 3,259 | Cusack, Conroy, Blake (pen), Scott |
| 31 January 1997 | Cardiff City | H | 1–4 | 6,459 | Eckhardt (own goal) |
| 8 February 1997 | Lincoln City | A | 0–2 | 3,948 | |
| 11 February 1997 | Swansea City | H | 2–1 | 4,836 | Freeman, Brooker |
| 15 February 1997 | Wigan Athletic | H | 1–1 | 9,448 | Blake |
| 22 February 1997 | Barnet | A | 2–2 | 3,316 | Conroy, Scott |
| 1 March 1997 | Chester City | H | 1–1 | 5,780 | Morgan |
| 8 March 1997 | Scarborough | H | 4–0 | 6,080 | Cockerill, Freeman, Blake (pen), Warren |
| 16 March 1997 | Leyton Orient | A | 2–0 | 7,125 | Blake (pen), Carpenter |
| 22 March 1997 | Hartlepool United | H | 1–0 | 7,222 | Freeman |
| 29 March 1997 | Hereford United | A | 0–0 | 4,279 | |
| 31 March 1997 | Rochdale | H | 1–1 | 7,866 | Conroy |
| 5 April 1997 | Carlisle United | A | 2–1 | 9,171 | Conroy, McAcree |
| 8 April 1997 | Mansfield Town | A | 0–0 | 3,912 | |
| 12 April 1997 | Northampton Town | H | 0–1 | 11,479 | |
| 19 April 1997 | Doncaster Rovers | A | 0–0 | 2,920 | |
| 26 April 1997 | Hull City | H | 2–0 | 10,588 | Morgan (2) |
| 3 May 1997 | Cambridge United | A | 1–0 | 7,218 | Freeman |

=== FA Cup ===
| Round | Date | Opponent | Venue | Result | Attendance | Goalscorers |
|---|---|---|---|---|---|---|
| R1 | 16 November 1996 | Plymouth Argyle | A | 0–5 | 7,104 | |

=== League Cup ===
| Round | Date | Opponent | Venue | Result | Attendance | Goalscorers |
|---|---|---|---|---|---|---|
| R1 1st Leg | 20 August 1996 | Southend United | A | 2–0 | 3,084 | Conroy, Watson |
| R1 2nd Leg | 3 September 1996 | Southend United | H | 1–2 (won 3–2 on agg) | 4,297 | Conroy |
| R2 1st Leg | 17 September 1996 | Ipswich Town | H | 1–1 | 6,947 | Morgan |
| R2 2nd Leg | 24 September 1996 | Ipswich Town | A | 2–4 (lost 3–5 on agg) | 6,825 | Sedgley (own goal), Brooker |

=== Football League Trophy ===
| Round | Date | Opponent | Venue | Result | Attendance | Goalscorers |
|---|---|---|---|---|---|---|
| SR1 | 17 December 1996 | Brighton & Hove Albion | A | 2–3 (a.e.t.) | 1,310 | |

== Squad ==
Note: Flags indicate national team as defined under FIFA eligibility rules; some limited exceptions apply. Players may hold more than one non-FIFA nationality.

| No. | Pos. | Nation | Player |
|---|---|---|---|
| — | GK | ENG | Tony Lange |
| — | GK | WAL | Mark Walton |
| — | DF | ENG | Micky Adams (player-manager) |
| — | DF | ENG | Terry Angus |
| — | DF | ENG | Mark Blake |
| — | DF | ENG | Danny Cullip |
| — | DF | ENG | Robbie Herrera |
| — | DF | ENG | Matthew Lawrence |
| — | DF | ENG | Simon Morgan |
| — | DF | ENG | Paul Parker |
| — | DF | ENG | Rob Scott |
| — | DF | ENG | Jason Soloman |
| — | DF | ENG | Simon Stewart |
| — | DF | ENG | Paul Watson |
| — | MF | ENG | Paul Brooker |

| No. | Pos. | Nation | Player |
|---|---|---|---|
| — | MF | ENG | Richard Carpenter |
| — | MF | ENG | Glenn Cockerill |
| — | MF | ENG | Nick Cusack |
| — | MF | ENG | Sean Davis |
| — | MF | ENG | Charlie Hartfield (on loan from Sheffield United) |
| — | MF | ENG | John Marshall |
| — | MF | NIR | Rodney McAree |
| — | MF | ENG | Michael Mison |
| — | MF | ENG | Martin Thomas |
| — | MF | ENG | Christer Warren (on loan from Southampton) |
| — | FW | ENG | Lea Barkus |
| — | FW | ENG | Darren Beckford |
| — | FW | SCO | Mike Conroy |
| — | FW | ENG | Darren Freeman |
| — | FW | NIR | Rory Hamill |
