= 2004–05 Reading F.C. season =

Reading
2004–05 season
- Chairman: John Madejski
- Manager: Steve Coppell
- Championship: 7th
- FA Cup: Fourth Round vs Leicester City
- League Cup: Second Round vs Watford
- Top goalscorer: League: Dave Kitson (19); All: Dave Kitson (19)
- Highest home attendance: 23,203 vs Ipswich Town (22 January 2005)
- Lowest home attendance: 8,429 vs Watford (21 September 2004)
| Home colours | Away colours | Third colours |

Reading Football Club played the season 2004–05 in the Football League Championship, in England

== Review and events ==
Reading started the season brightly. However, injury to the three strikers, Dave Kitson, Nicky Forster and Shaun Goater, meant that the goals dried up and they slipped down the league. For much of the season Ivar Ingimarsson, a centre back, was the club's main source of goals. However, Kitson's return, coupled with the signings of veterans and former England internationals Les Ferdinand and Martin Keown meant that the club broke a run of 11 league games without a win against West Ham. Reading won 3–1, with a Dave Kitson hat-trick. Reading just missed out on a playoff spot on the last day of the season, losing 3–1 to Wigan. Dave Kitson was the club's top scorer, with 19 goals.

== Squad ==
As of match played 9 May 2004

| No. | Name | Nationality | Position | Date of birth (Age (Note: Age as of the end of the season)) | Signed from | Signed in | Contract ends | Apps. | Goals |
Goalkeepers
| 1 | Marcus Hahnemann | (United States) | GK | 15 June 1972 (aged 32) | Fulham | 2002 | | 143 | 0 |
| 19 | Adam Federici | (England) | GK | 30 November 1980 (aged 24) | Torres | 2005 | | 0 | 0 |
| 26 | Jamie Young | (England) (Note: Jamie Young was born in Brisbane, Australia, and but qualified to represent England, represent England at U18, U19 and U20 level.) | GK | 25 August 1985 (aged 19) | Youth team | 2002 | | 1 | 0 |
Defenders
| 2 | Graeme Murty | (Scotland) (Note: Graeme Murty was born in Nunthorpe, England, but qualified to represent Scotland internationally through his parents and made his international debut for Scotland in 2004.) | DF | 13 November 1974 (aged 30) | York City | 1998 | | 242 | 1 |
| 3 | Nicky Shorey | (England) | DF | 19 February 1981 (aged 24) | Leyton Orient | 2001 | | 175 | 7 |
| 5 | Martin Keown | (England) | DF | 24 July 1966 (aged 38) | Leicester City | 2005 | 2005 | 8 | 0 |
| 6 | Ibrahima Sonko | (Senegal) | DF | 22 January 1981 (aged 24) | Brentford | 2004 | | 42 | 1 |
| 16 | Ívar Ingimarsson | (Iceland) | DF | 20 August 1977 (aged 27) | Wolverhampton Wanderers | 2003 | 2006 | 77 | 5 |
| 22 | Peter Castle | (England) | DF | 12 March 1987 (aged 18) | Academy | 2003 | | 1 | 0 |
Midfielders
| 4 | Steve Sidwell | (England) | MF | 14 December 1982 (aged 22) | Arsenal | 2003 | | 110 | 16 |
| 7 | Glen Little | (England) | MF | 15 October 1975 (aged 29) | Burnley | 2004 | | 46 | 1 |
| 11 | Andy Hughes | (England) | MF | 2 January 1978 (aged 27) | Notts County | 2001 | | 183 | 14 |
| 15 | James Harper | (England) | MF | 9 November 1980 (aged 24) | Arsenal | 2001 | | 175 | 8 |
| 17 | Bobby Convey | (United States) | MF | 27 May 1983 (aged 21) | D.C. United | 2004 | | 22 | 0 |
| 18 | Paul Brooker | (England) | MF | 25 November 1976 (aged 28) | Leicester City | 2004 | | 45 | 0 |
| 24 | Louie Soares | (England) (Note: Louie Soares was born in Reading, England, and but chose to represent Barbados, qualifying through his parents. Soares went on to represent Barbados in 2007.) | MF | 8 January 1985 (aged 20) | Academy | 2003 | | 0 | 0 |
| 25 | Ricky Newman | (England) | MF | 5 August 1970 (aged 34) | Millwall | 2000 | | 137 | 2 |
| 27 | Darren Campbell | (Scotland) (Note: Darren Campbell was born in Cambridge, England, but also qualified to represent Scotland internationally through his parents.Campbell represented the England U-17's in 2002 and then the Scotland U-17 team 2003.) | MF | 16 April 1986 (aged 19) | Academy | 2003 | | 1 | 0 |
| 29 | Simieon Howell | (England) | MF | 26 August 1985 (aged 19) | Academy | 2004 | | 0 | 0 |
| 30 | Jonny Hayes | (Republic of Ireland) | MF | 9 July 1987 (aged 17) | Academy | 2004 | | 0 | 0 |
Forwards
| 10 | Nicky Forster | (England) | FW | 8 September 1973 (aged 31) | Birmingham City | 1999 | | 215 | 67 |
| 12 | Dave Kitson | (England) | FW | 21 January 1980 (aged 25) | Cambridge United | 2003 | | 55 | 24 |
| 14 | Lloyd Owusu | (Ghana) (Note: Lloyd Owusu was born in Slough, England, but qualified to represent Ghana internationally through his parents and made his international debut for Ghana in 2005.) | FW | 12 December 1976 (aged 28) | Sheffield Wednesday | 2004 | | 46 | 10 |
| 20 | Bas Savage | (England) | FW | 7 January 1982 (aged 23) | Academy | 2001 | | 18 | 0 |
| 21 | Les Ferdinand | (England) | FW | 8 December 1966 (aged 38) | Bolton Wanderers | 2005 | 2005 | 14 | 1 |
| 23 | Dean Morgan | (England) | FW | 3 October 1983 (aged 21) | Colchester United | 2003 | | 35 | 3 |
Out on loan
| 9 | Shaun Goater | (Bermuda) | FW | 25 February 1970 (aged 35) | Manchester City | 2003 | 2006 | 49 | 15 |
Left during the season
| 8 | Ady Williams | (Wales) (Note: Ady Williams was born in Reading, England, but also qualified to represent Wales internationally, making his international debut for Wales in 1994.) | DF | 16 August 1971 (aged 33) | Wolverhampton Wanderers | 2000 | | | |
| 28 | Ahmet Rifat | (England) | DF | 3 January 1986 (aged 19) | Academy | 2003 | | 0 | 0 |

=== Out on loan ===
Note: Flags indicate national team as defined under FIFA eligibility rules; some limited exceptions apply. Players may hold more than one non-FIFA nationality.

| No. / Pos. / Nation / Player; 9 / FW / BER / Shaun Goater (at Coventry City) | No. / Pos. / Nation / Player |

=== Left club during season ===
Note: Flags indicate national team as defined under FIFA eligibility rules; some limited exceptions apply. Players may hold more than one non-FIFA nationality.

| No. / Pos. / Nation / Player; 8 / DF / WAL / Ady Williams (to Coventry City) | No. / Pos. / Nation / Player; 28 / DF / ENG / Ahmet Rifat |

== Transfers ==
=== In ===
| Date | Position | Nationality | Name | From | Fee | Ref. |
|---|---|---|---|---|---|---|
| 1 July 2004 | MF | (England) | Glen Little | Burnley | Free | |
| 2 July 2004 | MF | (England) | Paul Brooker | Leicester City | Free | |
| 2 July 2004 | DF | (Senegal) | Ibrahima Sonko | Brentford | Free | |
| 23 July 2004 | MF | (United States) | Bobby Convey | D.C. United | Undisclosed | |
| 6 January 2005 | FW | (England) | Les Ferdinand | Bolton Wanderers | Free | |
| 20 January 2005 | GK | (Australia) | Adam Federici | Unattached | Free | |
| 28 January 2005 | DF | (England) | Martin Keown | Leicester City | Free | |

=== Out ===
| Date | Position | Nationality | Name | To | Fee | Ref. |
|---|---|---|---|---|---|---|
| 2 November 2004 | DF | (Wales) | Ady Williams | Coventry City | Free | |
| 22 June 2005 | FW | (England) | Nicky Forster | Ipswich Town | Free | |
| 24 June 2005 | MF | (England) | Paul Brooker | Brentford | Free | |
| 27 June 2005 | FW | (Ghana) | Lloyd Owusu | Brentford | Free | |
| 21 July 2005 | MF | (England) | Andy Hughes | Norwich City | Undisclosed | |
| 22 July 2005 | FW | (England) | Dean Morgan | Luton Town | Free | |

=== Loans out ===
| Start date | Position | Nationality | Name | To | End date | Ref. |
|---|---|---|---|---|---|---|
| 24 March 2005 | FW | (Bermuda) | Shaun Goater | Coventry City | End of season | |

=== Released ===
| Date | Position | Nationality | Name | Joined | Date | Ref |
|---|---|---|---|---|---|---|
| 8 February 2005 | DF | (England) | Ahmet Rifat | | | |
| 11 May 2005 | FW | (England) | Les Ferdinand | Watford | | |
| 11 May 2005 | DF | (England) | Martin Keown | Retired | | |
| 11 May 2005 | MF | (England) | Ricky Newman | Brentford | 10 June 2005 | |
| 11 May 2005 | FW | (England) | Bas Savage | Bristol City | | |
| 11 May 2005 | MF | (England) | Louie Soares | Bristol Rovers | | |
| 27 July 2005 | FW | (Bermuda) | Shaun Goater | Southend United | 3 August 2005 | |

== Competitions ==
=== Overview ===
| Competition | First match | Last match | Starting round | Final position | Record | | | | | | | |
| Competition | First match | Last match | Starting round | Final position | Pld | W | D | L | GF | GA | GD | Win % |
|---|---|---|---|---|---|---|---|---|---|---|---|---|
| Championship | 7 August 2004 | 8 May 2005 | Matchday 1 | 7th | 46 | 19 | 13 | 14 | 51 | 44 | +7 | 41.30 |
| FA Cup | 8 January 2005 | 29 January 2005 | Third round | Fourth round | 3 | 1 | 1 | 1 | 3 | 3 | +0 | 33.33 |
| League Cup | 25 August 2004 | 21 September 2004 | First round | Second round | 2 | 1 | 0 | 1 | 2 | 3 | −1 | 50.00 |
| Total | | | | | 51 | 21 | 14 | 16 | 56 | 50 | +6 | 41.18 |

Last updated: 8 May 2005
Source: Competitions

=== Championship ===
==== Results summary ====
| Overall | | | | | | | | Home | | | | | | Away | | | | | |
| Pld | W | D | L | GF | GA | GD | Pts | W | D | L | GF | GA | GD | W | D | L | GF | GA | GD |
|---|---|---|---|---|---|---|---|---|---|---|---|---|---|---|---|---|---|---|---|
| 46 | 19 | 13 | 14 | 51 | 47 | +4 | 70 | 13 | 7 | 3 | 33 | 15 | +18 | 6 | 6 | 11 | 18 | 32 | −14 |

==== Results by round ====
| Round | 1 | 2 | 3 | 4 | 5 | 6 | 7 | 8 | 9 | 10 | 11 | 12 | 13 | 14 | 15 | 16 | 17 | 18 | 19 | 20 | 21 | 22 | 23 | 24 | 25 | 26 | 27 | 28 | 29 | 30 | 31 | 32 | 33 | 34 | 35 | 36 | 37 | 38 | 39 | 40 | 41 | 42 | 43 | 44 | 45 | 46 |
|---|---|---|---|---|---|---|---|---|---|---|---|---|---|---|---|---|---|---|---|---|---|---|---|---|---|---|---|---|---|---|---|---|---|---|---|---|---|---|---|---|---|---|---|---|---|---|
| Ground | H | A | A | H | A | H | A | H | H | A | A | H | A | H | H | A | A | H | H | A | A | H | H | A | H | A | A | H | A | H | H | A | H | A | H | A | H | A | A | H | H | A | H | A | H | A |
| Result | W | L | W | W | L | W | L | W | W | W | D | D | W | D | W | L | D | W | W | L | D | L | W | W | W | L | D | L | D | D | D | L | L | D | D | D | W | L | W | D | W | W | W | L | L | L |
| Position | 2 | 11 | 3 | 3 | 8 | 5 | 6 | 5 | 2 | 1 | 1 | 2 | 2 | 2 | 2 | 3 | 4 | 3 | 3 | 3 | 4 | 4 | 4 | 4 | 3 | 4 | 4 | 4 | 4 | 4 | 4 | 5 | 7 | 7 | 7 | 6 | 6 | 6 | 6 | 5 | 5 | 6 | 6 | 7 | 7 | 7 |

Source: BBC Sport
A = Away; H = Home; W = Win; D = Draw; L = Loss

==== Results ====
| 7 August 2004 1 | Reading | 3–2 | Brighton & Hove Albion | Reading |
| 15:00 BST (UTC+1) | Kitson 2'; Harper 41'; Forster 60'; Forster (yellow card) | [ Report] | Molango 1'; Robinson 63'; Cullip (yellow card); Jarrett (yellow card) | Stadium: Madejski Stadium; Attendance: 15,641; Referee: P.Crossley |

| 10 August 2004 2 | West Ham United | 1–0 | Reading | Upton Park |
| 20:00 BST (UTC+1) | Sheringham 82'; Dailly (yellow card); Reo-Coker (yellow card); Zamora (yellow card) | [ Report] | | Stadium: Boleyn Ground; Attendance: 26,242; Referee: P.Taylor |

| 14 August 2004 3 | Sheffield United | 0–1 | Reading | Sheffield |
| 15:00 BST (UTC+1) | | [ Report] | Harper 41'; Williams (yellow card); Kitson (yellow card) | Stadium: Bramall Lane; Attendance: 22,429; Referee: Anthony Bates |

| 21 August 2004 4 | Reading | 1–0 | Rotherham United | Reading |
| 15:00 BST (UTC+1) | Kitson 45' (pen.) | [ Report] | Barker (yellow card); Sedgwick (yellow card); Scott (yellow card) | Stadium: Madejski Stadium; Attendance: 11,404; Referee: Lee Probert |

| 28 August 2004 5 | Millwall | 1–0 | Reading | South Bermondsey |
| 15:00 BST (UTC+1) | Dichio 79'; Serioux (yellow card); Wise (yellow card) | [ Report] | | Stadium: The Den; Attendance: 12,098; Referee: Keith Hill |

| 31 August 2004 6 | Reading | 1–0 | Sunderland | Reading |
| 20:00 BST (UTC+1) | Forster 2' | [ Report] | Whitley (yellow card); Thornton (yellow card) | Stadium: Madejski Stadium; Attendance: 15,792; Referee: Alan Wiley |

| 11 September 2004 7 | Derby County | 2–1 | Reading | Derby |
| 15:00 BST (UTC+1) | Smith 70'; Tudgay 82'; Konjić (yellow card); Johnson (yellow card); Idiakez (yellow card); Júnior (yellow card) | [ Report] | Shorey 87'; Sidwell (yellow card) | Stadium: Pride Park; Attendance: 22,096; Referee: Michael Ryan |

| 14 September 2004 8 | Reading | 3–1 | Preston North End | Reading |
| 20:00 BST (UTC+1) | Kitson 11'; Forster 34', 85' | [ Report] | Healy 87'; Mawéné (yellow card); Alexander (yellow card) | Stadium: Madejski Stadium; Attendance: 11,857; Referee: Richard Beeby |

| 18 September 2004 9 | Reading | 3–1 | Gillingham | Reading |
| 15:00 BST (UTC+1) | Kitson 1', 16' (pen.), 28' (pen.) | [ Report] | Byfield 55'; Cox (yellow card) | Stadium: Madejski Stadium; Attendance: 13,867; Referee: Kevin Friend |

| 25 September 2004 10 | Watford | 0–1 | Reading | Watford |
| 15:00 BST (UTC+1) | Helguson (yellow card) | [ Report] | Sidwell 65' | Stadium: Vicarage Road; Attendance: 13,389; Referee: Mike Thorpe |

| 28 September 2004 11 | Ipswich Town | 1–1 | Reading | Ipswich |
| 19:45 BST (UTC+1) | Kuqi 10' (yellow card) | [ Report] | Kitson 26'; Sidwell (yellow card) | Stadium: Portman Road; Attendance: 23,167; Referee: Mike Jones |

| 2 October 2004 12 | Reading | 0–0 | Burnley | Reading |
| 15:00 BST (UTC+1) | Sidwell (yellow card); Kitson (yellow card) | [ Report] | Duff (yellow card); Camara (yellow card) | Stadium: Madejski Stadium; Attendance: 15,400; Referee: Andy Penn |

| 16 October 2004 13 | Stoke City | 0–1 | Reading | Stoke-on-Trent |
| 15:00 BST (UTC+1) | Brammer (yellow card); Asaba (yellow card) | [ Report] | Shorey 41'; Sonko (yellow card) | Stadium: Britannia Stadium; Attendance: 15,400; Referee: Andy D'Urso |

| 19 October 2004 14 | Reading | 1–1 | Leeds United | Reading |
| 20:00 BST (UTC+1) | Owusu 45' | [ Report] | Walton 1' (yellow card) | Stadium: Madejski Stadium; Attendance: 22,230; Referee: R.Olivier |

| 23 October 2004 15 | Reading | 4–0 | Crewe Alexandra | Reading |
| 15:00 BST (UTC+1) | Sidwell 21'; Kitson 25'; Owusu 45'; Ingimarsson 47'; Harper (yellow card) | [ Report] | Lunt (yellow card); Cochrane (yellow card) | Stadium: Madejski Stadium; Attendance: 13,630; Referee: Paul Robinson |

| 30 October 2004 16 | Coventry City | 3–2 | Reading | Coventry |
| 15:00 GMT (UTC) | John 14' (pen.); Morrell 51'; Johnson 67'; Carey (yellow card) | [ Report] | Owusu 11'; Kitson 70' | Stadium: Highfield Road; Attendance: 13,663; Referee: Graham Salisbury |

| 2 November 2004 17 | Plymouth Argyle | 2–2 | Reading | Plymouth |
| 19:45 GMT (UTC) | Sidwell 18' (o.g.); Crawford 41' | [ Report] | Coughlan 51' (o.g.); Kitson 90'; Little (yellow card) | Stadium: Home Park; Attendance: 14,336; Referee: Alan Wiley |

| 6 November 2004 18 | Reading | 1–0 | Stoke City | Reading |
| 15:00 GMT (UTC) | Kitson 23'; Sidwell (yellow card) | [ Report] | Russell (yellow card); Greenacre (yellow card) | Stadium: Madejski Stadium; Attendance: 14,831; Referee: G.Laws |

| 13 November 2004 19 | Reading | 2–1 | Cardiff City | Reading |
| 15:00 GMT (UTC) | Morgan 13'; Kitson 39' | [ Report] | Kavanagh (red card) 57'; Jerome 87'; Lee (yellow card) | Stadium: Madejski Stadium; Attendance: 16,107; Referee: Eddie Evans |

| 20 November 2004 20 | Nottingham Forest | 1–0 | Reading | Nottingham |
| 15:00 GMT (UTC) | Taylor 25'; Thompson (yellow card); Dawson (yellow card) | [ Report] | Murty (yellow card); Sonko (yellow card); Hughes (yellow card) | Stadium: City Ground; Attendance: 21,138; Referee: Uriah Rennie |

| 27 November 2004 21 | Reading | 1–1 | Wigan Athletic | Reading |
| 15:00 GMT (UTC) | Owusu 42' | [ Report] | Mahon 26' | Stadium: Madejski Stadium; Attendance: 22,114; Referee: Andre Marriner |

| 4 December 2004 22 | Wolverhampton Wanderers | 4–1 | Reading | Wolverhampton |
| 15:00 GMT (UTC) | Cameron 32'; Olofinjana 45'; Clarke 78', 90' | [ Report] | Morgan 47'; Shorey (yellow card) | Stadium: Molineux; Attendance: 25,572; Referee: Steve Bennett |

| 11 December 2004 23 | Leicester City | 0–2 | Reading | Leicester |
| 15:00 GMT (UTC) | Stearman (yellow card); Nalis (yellow card); Blake (yellow card) | [ Report] | Sidwell 68' (yellow card); Ingimarsson 82'; Kitson (yellow card); Owusu (yellow card) | Stadium: Walkers Stadium; Attendance: 24,068; Referee: P.Taylor |

| 18 December 2004 24 | Reading | 1–0 | Queens Park Rangers | Reading |
| 12:45 GMT (UTC) | Shorey 64'; Kitson (yellow card); Harper (yellow card) | [ Report] | Cureton (red card) 73'; Bircham (yellow card); Rowlands (yellow card) | Stadium: Madejski Stadium; Attendance: 20,272; Referee: Richard Beeby |

| 26 December 2004 25 | Reading | 3–0 | Watford | Reading |
| 11:00 GMT (UTC) | Sonko 3'; Sidwell 76'; Owusu 87'; Little (yellow card) | [ Report] | Mahon (yellow card) | Stadium: Madejski Stadium; Attendance: 18,757; Referee: P.Crossley |

| 28 December 2004 26 | Preston North End | 3–0 | Reading | Preston |
| 15:00 GMT (UTC) | Agyemang 17'; Hughes 26' (o.g.); Lewis 67' (yellow card); Cresswell (yellow card) | [ Report] | Sidwell (yellow card) | Stadium: Deepdale; Attendance: 12,795; Referee: Carl Boyeson |

| 1 January 2005 27 | Gillingham | 0–0 | Reading | Gillingham |
| 15:00 GMT (UTC) | | [ Report] | | Stadium: Priestfield Stadium; Attendance: 8,570; Referee: Steve Bennett |

| 3 January 2005 28 | Reading | 0–1 | Derby County | Reading |
| 17:30 GMT (UTC) | Harper (yellow card) | [ Report] | Smith 45'; Johnson (yellow card); Idiakez (yellow card) | Stadium: Madejski Stadium; Attendance: 15,491; Referee: B.Curson |

| 15 January 2005 29 | Burnley | 0–0 | Reading | Burnley |
| 15:00 GMT (UTC) | | [ Report] | Sidwell (yellow card) | Stadium: Turf Moor; Attendance: 11,392; Referee: Mike Jones |

| 22 January 2005 30 | Reading | 1–1 | Ipswich Town | Reading |
| 15:00 GMT (UTC) | Ingimarsson 90'; Owusu (yellow card) | [ Report] | Bent 89' | Stadium: Madejski Stadium; Attendance: 23,203; Referee: Martin Atkinson |

| 5 February 2005 31 | Reading | 0–0 | Plymouth Argyle | Reading |
| 15:00 GMT (UTC) | | [ Report] | Buzsáky (yellow card) | Stadium: Madejski Stadium; Attendance: 19,783; Referee: R.Olivier |

| 12 February 2005 32 | Leeds United | 3–1 | Reading | Leeds |
| 15:00 GMT (UTC) | Healy 37'; Hulse 57', 62'; Hulse (yellow card) | [ Report] | Owusu 88'; Harper (yellow card) | Stadium: Elland Road; Attendance: 30,034; Referee: Chris Foy |

| 19 February 2005 33 | Reading | 1–2 | Coventry City | Reading |
| 15:00 GMT (UTC) | Ferdinand 8' (yellow card); Murty (yellow card) | [ Report] | McSheffrey 63' (yellow card); John 72' | Stadium: Madejski Stadium; Attendance: 15,904; Referee: Graham Salisbury |

| 22 February 2005 34 | Crewe Alexandra | 1–1 | Reading | Crewe |
| 19:45 GMT (UTC) | Varney 12'; Tonkin (yellow card) | [ Report] | Kitson 70' | Stadium: Alexandra Stadium; Attendance: 5,703; Referee: G.Laws |

| 26 February 2005 35 | Reading | 0–0 | Leicester City | Reading |
| 15:00 GMT (UTC) | Shorey (yellow card) | [ Report] | Stearman (yellow card); Gudjonsson (yellow card); Connolly (yellow card) | Stadium: Madejski Stadium; Attendance: 14,651; Referee: Uriah Rennie |

| 5 March 2005 36 | Queens Park Rangers | 0–0 | Reading | Shepherd's Bush |
| 15:00 GMT (UTC) | | [ Report] | | Stadium: Loftus Road; Attendance: 16,971; Referee: Anthony Leake |

| 12 March 2005 37 | Reading | 3–1 | West Ham United | Reading |
| 15:00 GMT (UTC) | Kitson 13', 27', 57'; Newman (yellow card) | [ Report] | Sheringham 82'; Fletcher (yellow card) | Stadium: Madejski Stadium; Attendance: 22,268; Referee: Phil Joslin |

| 15 March 2005 38 | Rotherham United | 1–0 | Reading | Rotherham |
| 19:45 GMT (UTC) | Warne 90'; McLaren (yellow card) | [ Report] | | Stadium: Millmoor; Attendance: 3,804; Referee: R.Hall |

| 21 March 2005 39 | Brighton & Hove Albion | 0–1 | Reading | Brighton |
| 19:45 GMT (UTC) | Butters (yellow card) | [ Report] | Forster 64'; Newman (yellow card) | Stadium: Withdean Stadium; Attendance: 6,108; Referee: Kevin Friend |

| 2 April 2005 40 | Reading | 0–0 | Sheffield United | Reading |
| 15:00 BST (UTC+1) | | [ Report] | | Stadium: Madejski Stadium; Attendance: 18,899; Referee: Mike Jones |

| 5 April 2005 41 | Reading | 2–1 | Millwall | Reading |
| 20:00 BST (UTC+1) | Kitson 73'; Forster 83' | [ Report] | Dichio 39' | Stadium: Madejski Stadium; Attendance: 14,379; Referee: Kevin Wright |

| 9 April 2005 42 | Sunderland | 1–2 | Reading | Sunderland |
| 12:45 BST (UTC+1) | Arca 51'; Wright (yellow card); Robinson (yellow card); Brown (yellow card) | [ Report] | Kitson 75', 81' (pen.); Sidwell (yellow card) | Stadium: Stadium of Light; Attendance: 34,237; Referee: Lee Mason |

| 16 April 2005 43 | Reading | 1–0 | Nottingham Forest | Reading |
| 15:00 BST (UTC+1) | Harper 74'; Sidwell (yellow card) | [ Report] | Gerrard (red card) 71'; Gardner (yellow card) | Stadium: Madejski Stadium; Attendance: 17,905; Referee: Steve Tanner |

| 23 April 2005 44 | Cardiff City | 2–0 | Reading | Cardiff |
| 15:00 BST (UTC+1) | Thorne 13'; Jerome 31' | [ Report] | Keown (yellow card); Sidwell (yellow card); Little (yellow card) | Stadium: Ninian Park; Attendance: 14,821; Referee: Scott Mathieson |

| 30 April 2005 45 | Reading | 1–2 | Wolverhampton Wanderers | Reading |
| 15:00 BST (UTC+1) | Forster 8'; Ingimarsson (yellow card) | [ Report] | Clarke 53'; Ricketts 84' (yellow card); Olofinjana (yellow card); Seol (yellow card) | Stadium: Madejski Stadium; Attendance: 20,495; Referee: R.Styles |

| 8 May 2005 46 | Wigan Athletic | 3–1 | Reading | Wigan |
| 13:00 BST (UTC+1) | McCulloch 18'; Roberts 21'; Ellington 85'; Kavanagh (yellow card) | [ Report] | Sidwell 90'; Little (yellow card) | Stadium: JJB Stadium; Attendance: 19,662; Referee: Martin Atkinson |

==== League table ====
| Pos | Team | Pld | W | D | L | GF | GA | GD | Pts | Promotion, qualification or relegation |
|---|---|---|---|---|---|---|---|---|---|---|
| 5 | Preston North End | 46 | 21 | 12 | 13 | 67 | 58 | +9 | 75 | Qualification for Championship play-offs |
| 6 | West Ham United (O, P) | 46 | 21 | 10 | 15 | 66 | 56 | +10 | 73 | Qualification for Championship play-offs |
| 7 | Reading | 46 | 19 | 13 | 14 | 51 | 44 | +7 | 70 | |
| 8 | Sheffield United | 46 | 18 | 13 | 15 | 57 | 56 | +1 | 67 | |
| 9 | Wolverhampton Wanderers | 46 | 15 | 21 | 10 | 72 | 59 | +13 | 66 | |

Updated to match(es) played on 9 December 2011. Source: Football League Tables
Rules for classification: 1) points; 2) goal difference; 3) number of goals scored.
(O) Play-off winners; (P) Promoted

=== FA Cup ===
| 8 January 2005 Third Round | Reading | 1–1 | Swansea City | Reading |
| 15:00 GMT (UTC) | Ingimarsson 88'; Sidwell (yellow card) | Report | Connor 32'; Robinson (yellow card) | Stadium: Madejski Stadium; Attendance: 13,642; Referee: Clive Penton |

| 17 January 2005 Third Round Reply | Swansea City | 0–1 (a.e.t.) | Reading | Swansea |
| 19:45 GMT (UTC) | Forbes (yellow card) | Report | Forster 95' | Stadium: Vetch Field; Attendance: 7,354; Referee: Clive Penton |

| 29 January 2005 Fourth Round | Reading | 1–2 | Leicester City | Reading |
| 15:00 GMT (UTC) | Forster 10'; Newman (yellow card) (yellow-red card) 76' | Report | Williams 32'; Scowcroft 90'; Guðjónsson (yellow card); Heath (yellow card) | Stadium: Madejski Stadium; Attendance: 14,825; Referee: Andy D'Urso |

=== League Cup ===
| 25 August 2004 First Round | Oxford United | 0–2 | Reading | Oxford |
| 19:45 BST (UTC+1) | | Report | Goater 61'; Hughes 76'; Owusu (yellow card) | Stadium: Kassam Stadium; Attendance: 5,919; Referee: M.Fletcher |

| 21 September 2004 Second Round | Reading | 0–3 | Watford | Reading |
| 20:00 BST (UTC+1) | Sidwell (yellow card) | Report | Cox 14' (pen.); Bouazza 89'; Ingimarsson 90' (o.g.); Blizzard (yellow card) | Stadium: Madejski Stadium; Attendance: 8,429; Referee: Clive Penton |

== Squad statistics ==
As of match played 8 May 2005

=== Appearances and goals ===
| No. | Pos | Nat | Player | Total | | Championship | | FA Cup | | League Cup | |
| No. | Pos | Nat | Player | Apps | Goals | Apps | Goals | Apps | Goals | Apps | Goals |
|---|---|---|---|---|---|---|---|---|---|---|---|
| 1 | GK | (United States) USA | Marcus Hahnemann | 51 | 0 | 46 | 0 | 3 | 0 | 2 | 0 |
| 2 | DF | (Scotland) SCO | Graeme Murty | 45 | 0 | 41 | 0 | 2 | 0 | 2 | 0 |
| 3 | DF | (England) ENG | Nicky Shorey | 48 | 3 | 44 | 3 | 3 | 0 | 1 | 0 |
| 4 | MF | (England) ENG | Steve Sidwell | 47 | 5 | 44 | 5 | 2 | 0 | 1 | 0 |
| 5 | DF | (England) ENG | Martin Keown | 8 | 0 | 3+2 | 0 | 3 | 0 | 0 | 0 |
| 6 | DF | (Senegal) SEN | Ibrahima Sonko | 42 | 1 | 35+4 | 1 | 3 | 0 | 0 | 0 |
| 7 | MF | (England) ENG | Glen Little | 39 | 0 | 29+6 | 0 | 3 | 0 | 1 | 0 |
| 10 | FW | (England) ENG | Nicky Forster | 34 | 9 | 27+3 | 7 | 3 | 2 | 0+1 | 0 |
| 11 | MF | (England) ENG | Andy Hughes | 46 | 1 | 40+1 | 0 | 3 | 0 | 2 | 1 |
| 12 | FW | (England) ENG | Dave Kitson | 38 | 19 | 37 | 19 | 0 | 0 | 1 | 0 |
| 14 | FW | (Ghana) GHA | Lloyd Owusu | 30 | 6 | 14+11 | 6 | 0+3 | 0 | 1+1 | 0 |
| 15 | MF | (England) ENG | James Harper | 46 | 3 | 39+2 | 3 | 3 | 0 | 1+1 | 0 |
| 16 | DF | (Iceland) ISL | Ívar Ingimarsson | 49 | 4 | 43+1 | 3 | 3 | 1 | 2 | 0 |
| 17 | MF | (United States) USA | Bobby Convey | 22 | 0 | 4+14 | 0 | 2 | 0 | 1+1 | 0 |
| 18 | MF | (England) ENG | Paul Brooker | 34 | 0 | 22+9 | 0 | 0+1 | 0 | 2 | 0 |
| 21 | FW | (England) ENG | Les Ferdinand | 14 | 1 | 4+8 | 1 | 2 | 0 | 0 | 0 |
| 23 | FW | (England) ENG | Dean Morgan | 20 | 2 | 10+8 | 2 | 0+1 | 0 | 0+1 | 0 |
| 33 | MF | (England) ENG | Ricky Newman | 19 | 0 | 11+6 | 0 | 1 | 0 | 1 | 0 |
Players away on loan:
| 9 | FW | (Bermuda) BER | Shaun Goater | 11 | 1 | 2+7 | 0 | 0 | 0 | 2 | 1 |
Players who left Reading during the season:
| 8 | DF | (Wales) WAL | Ady Williams | 13 | 0 | 11 | 0 | 0 | 0 | 2 | 0 |

=== Goal scorers ===
| Place | Position | Nation | Number | Name | Championship | FA Cup | League Cup | Total |
|---|---|---|---|---|---|---|---|---|
| 1 | FW | (England) | 12 | Dave Kitson | 19 | 0 | 0 | 19 |
| 2 | FW | (England) | 10 | Nicky Forster | 7 | 2 | 0 | 9 |
| 3 | FW | (Ghana) | 14 | Lloyd Owusu | 6 | 0 | 0 | 6 |
| 4 | MF | (England) | 4 | Steve Sidwell | 5 | 0 | 0 | 5 |
| 5 | DF | (Iceland) | 16 | Ívar Ingimarsson | 3 | 1 | 0 | 4 |
| 6 | MF | (England) | 15 | James Harper | 3 | 0 | 0 | 3 |
| 6 | DF | (England) | 3 | Nicky Shorey | 3 | 0 | 0 | 3 |
| 8 | FW | (England) | 23 | Dean Morgan | 2 | 0 | 0 | 2 |
| 9 | DF | (Senegal) | 6 | Ibrahima Sonko | 1 | 0 | 0 | 2 |
| 9 | FW | (England) | 21 | Les Ferdinand | 1 | 0 | 0 | 1 |
| 9 | FW | (Bermuda) | 9 | Shaun Goater | 0 | 0 | 1 | 1 |
| 9 | MF | (England) | 11 | Andy Hughes | 0 | 0 | 1 | 1 |
| 9 | | | | Own goal | 1 | 0 | 0 | 1 |
| | | | | TOTALS | 51 | 3 | 2 | 56 |

=== Clean sheets ===
| Place | Position | Nation | Number | Name | Championship | FA Cup | League Cup | Total |
|---|---|---|---|---|---|---|---|---|
| 1 | GK | (United States) | 1 | Marcus Hahnemann | 19 | 1 | 1 | 21 |
| TOTALS | | | | | 19 | 1 | 1 | 21 |

=== Disciplinary record ===
Source: Soccernet

| Number | Nation | Position | Name | First Division | | FA Cup | | League Cup | | Total | |
| Number | Nation | Position | Name | Yellow card | Red card | Yellow card | Red card | Yellow card | Red card | Yellow card | Red card |
| 2 | (Scotland) | DF | Graeme Murty | 2 | 0 | 0 | 0 | 0 | 0 | 2 | 0 |
| 3 | (England) | DF | Nicky Shorey | 2 | 0 | 0 | 0 | 0 | 0 | 2 | 0 |
| 4 | (England) | MF | Steve Sidwell | 11 | 0 | 1 | 0 | 1 | 0 | 13 | 0 |
| 5 | (England) | DF | Martin Keown | 1 | 0 | 0 | 0 | 0 | 0 | 1 | 0 |
| 6 | (Senegal) | DF | Ibrahima Sonko | 2 | 0 | 0 | 0 | 0 | 0 | 2 | 0 |
| 7 | (England) | MF | Glen Little | 4 | 0 | 0 | 0 | 0 | 0 | 4 | 0 |
| 10 | (England) | FW | Nicky Forster | 1 | 0 | 0 | 0 | 1 | 0 | 2 | 0 |
| 11 | (England) | MF | Andy Hughes | 2 | 0 | 0 | 0 | 0 | 0 | 2 | 0 |
| 12 | (England) | FW | Dave Kitson | 4 | 0 | 0 | 0 | 0 | 0 | 4 | 0 |
| 14 | (Ghana) | FW | Lloyd Owusu | 2 | 0 | 0 | 0 | 1 | 0 | 3 | 0 |
| 15 | (England) | MF | James Harper | 4 | 0 | 0 | 0 | 0 | 0 | 4 | 0 |
| 16 | (Iceland) | DF | Ivar Ingimarsson | 1 | 0 | 0 | 0 | 0 | 0 | 1 | 0 |
| 21 | (England) | FW | Les Ferdinand | 1 | 0 | 0 | 0 | 0 | 0 | 1 | 0 |
| 25 | (England) | MF | Ricky Newman | 2 | 0 | 1 | 1 | 0 | 0 | 3 | 1 |
Players who left Reading during the season:
| 8 | (Wales) | DF | Ady Williams | 2 | 0 | 0 | 0 | 0 | 0 | 2 | 0 |
| | | | TOTALS | 41 | 0 | 2 | 1 | 3 | 0 | 46 | 1 |
