= Paul Brooker =

English footballer

Personal information
- Full name: Paul Brooker
- Date of birth: 25 November 1976 (age 49)
- Place of birth: Hammersmith, England
- Height: 5 ft 8 in (1.73 m)
- Position: Winger

Youth career
- Chelsea
- –1995: Fulham

Senior career*
Years	Team	Apps	(Gls)
1995–2000	Fulham	56	(4)
1998–1999	→ Stevenage Borough (loan)	8	(1)
2000	→ Brighton & Hove Albion (loan)	15	(2)
2000–2003	Brighton & Hove Albion	118	(13)
2003–2004	Leicester City	3	(0)
2004	→ Reading (loan)	11	(0)
2004–2005	Reading	31	(0)
2005–2007	Brentford	71	(4)
2008–2009	Chertsey Town	36	(9)
2008	→ Havant & Waterlooville (loan)	1	(0)
2010	Dorking Wanderers		
- * Club domestic league appearances and goals

Paul Brooker (born 25 November 1976) is an English retired professional footballer who played as a winger in the Football League for Fulham, Brighton & Hove Albion, Leicester City, Reading and Brentford.

== Career ==
=== Fulham and Brighton & Hove Albion (1995–2003) ===
Able to play on either wing, Brooker began his career as a schoolboy at Chelsea, before joining the youth system at West London rivals Fulham. He turned professional in 1995 and broke through into the first team during the 1996–97 season. He was a part of the team which secured promotion to the Second Division in May 1997. Brooker was out of favour over the course of the following three seasons and made just one league appearance during the Cottagers' 1998–99 promotion season. He spent time away on loan at Stevenage Borough and Brighton & Hove Albion and joined the latter club on a three-year contract for a £25,000 fee in May 2000, a move which reunited him with his former Fulham manager Micky Adams.

After breaking into the starting lineup in February 2001, Brooker became an integral part of the Brighton & Hove Albion team which won consecutive promotions from the Third to the First Division in 2001 and 2002. He turned down a new two-year contract in August 2002 and departed the Withdean Stadium when his contract expired at the end of the 2002–03 season. He made 147 appearances and scored 16 goals during just over three seasons with Brighton & Hove Albion.

=== Leicester City, Reading and Brentford (2003–2007) ===
On 1 July 2003, Brooker reunited with Micky Adams for the third time at Premier League club Leicester City and signed a two-year contract on a free transfer. He made just six appearances during the 2003–04 season and spent just over two months on loan at First Division club Reading, with whom he signed a two-year contract on a free transfer on 2 July 2004. Brooker made 34 appearances during the 2004–05 season, but was allowed to join League One club Brentford on a free transfer on 1 July 2005.

Though Brentford were defeated in the 2006 League One play-off semi-finals, Brooker had a successful 2005–06 season, making 45 appearances and scoring four goals, one of which late in the season versus Swindon Town was described as "a superb individual effort", in which he "ran from within his own half and beat three defenders before scoring". The strike was nominated for the Goal of the Year award at the 2007 Football League Awards. He was again a regular during a disastrous 2006–07 season, which finished with relegation to League Two. The end to Brooker's season was doubly soured when he "stupidly gesticulated in the direction of the fans" after being substituted on the final day during a match versus Tranmere Rovers. Supporter taunts led him to react again during a pre-season friendly versus Harrow Borough in July 2007. Despite having been previously in negotiations to leave the club, Brooker received backing from new manager Terry Butcher, but after two early-2007–08 season appearances, his contract was terminated by mutual consent on 30 August 2007. He made 86 appearances and scored four goals during just over two seasons with Brentford.

=== Non-League football (2008–2010) ===
Aside from a spell training with former club Brighton & Hove Albion in September 2008, Brooker spent the remainder of his career in non-League football, playing for Chertsey Town, Havant & Waterlooville and Dorking Wanderers.

== Personal life ==
After leaving professional football, Brooker set up a carpet cleaning business.

== Career statistics ==
Appearances and goals by club, season and competition
Club	Season	League			FA Cup		League Cup		Other		Total	
Club	Season	Division	Apps	Goals	Apps	Goals	Apps	Goals	Apps	Goals	Apps	Goals
Fulham	1995–96	Third Division	9	2	1	1	0	0	0	0	10	3
Fulham	1996–97	Third Division	22	2	1	0	1	1	0	0	24	3
Fulham	1997–98	Second Division	10	0	0	0	2	0	2 (Note: Appearances in Football League Trophy.)	0	14	0
Fulham	1998–99	Second Division	1	0	0	0	0	0	1	0	2	0
Fulham	1999–2000	First Division	0	0	0	0	0	0	—		0	0
Fulham	Total		42	4	2	1	3	1	3	0	50	6
Stevenage Borough (loan)	1998–99	Conference	10	1	—		—		—		10	1
Brighton & Hove Albion (loan)	1999–2000	Third Division	15	2	—		—		—		15	2
Brighton & Hove Albion	2000–01	Third Division	40	3	1	0	2	0	2	1	45	4
Brighton & Hove Albion	2001–02	Second Division	41	4	3	0	2	0	1	0	47	4
Brighton & Hove Albion	2002–03	First Division	37	6	1	0	2	0	—		40	6
Brighton & Hove Albion	Total		133	15	5	0	6	0	3	1	147	16
Leicester City	2003–04	Premier League	3	0	1	0	2	0	—		6	0
Reading (loan)	2003–04	First Division	11	0	—		—		—		11	0
Reading	2004–05	Championship	31	0	1	0	2	0	—		34	0
Reading	Total		42	0	1	0	2	0	—		45	0
Brentford	2005–06	League One	36	4	6	0	1	0	2 (Note: Appearances in League One play-offs.)	0	45	4
Brentford	2006–07	League One	34	0	1	0	2	0	2	0	39	0
Brentford	2007–08	League Two	1	0	—		1	0	—		2	0
Brentford	Total		71	4	7	0	4	0	4	0	86	4
Chertsey Town	2007–08	Combined Counties League Premier Division	7	2	—		—		—		7	2
Chertsey Town	2008–09	Combined Counties League Premier Division	29	7	2	0	—		5 (Note: 1 appearance and 2 goals in FA Vase, 2 appearances in Combined Counties League Premier Challenge Cup, 2 appearances and 2 goals in Surrey Senior Cup.)	4	36	11
Chertsey Town	Total		36	9	2	0	—		5	4	43	13
Havant & Waterlooville (loan)	2008–09	Conference South	1	0	—		—		1 (Note: Appearance in Conference League Cup.)	0	1	0
Career total			338	33	18	1	17	1	16	5	389	40

== Honours ==
Fulham

- Football League Third Division second-place promotion: 1996–97

Brighton & Hove Albion

- Football League Second Division: 2001–02
- Football League Third Division: 2000–01
