= Steve Sidwell =

English footballer (born 1982)

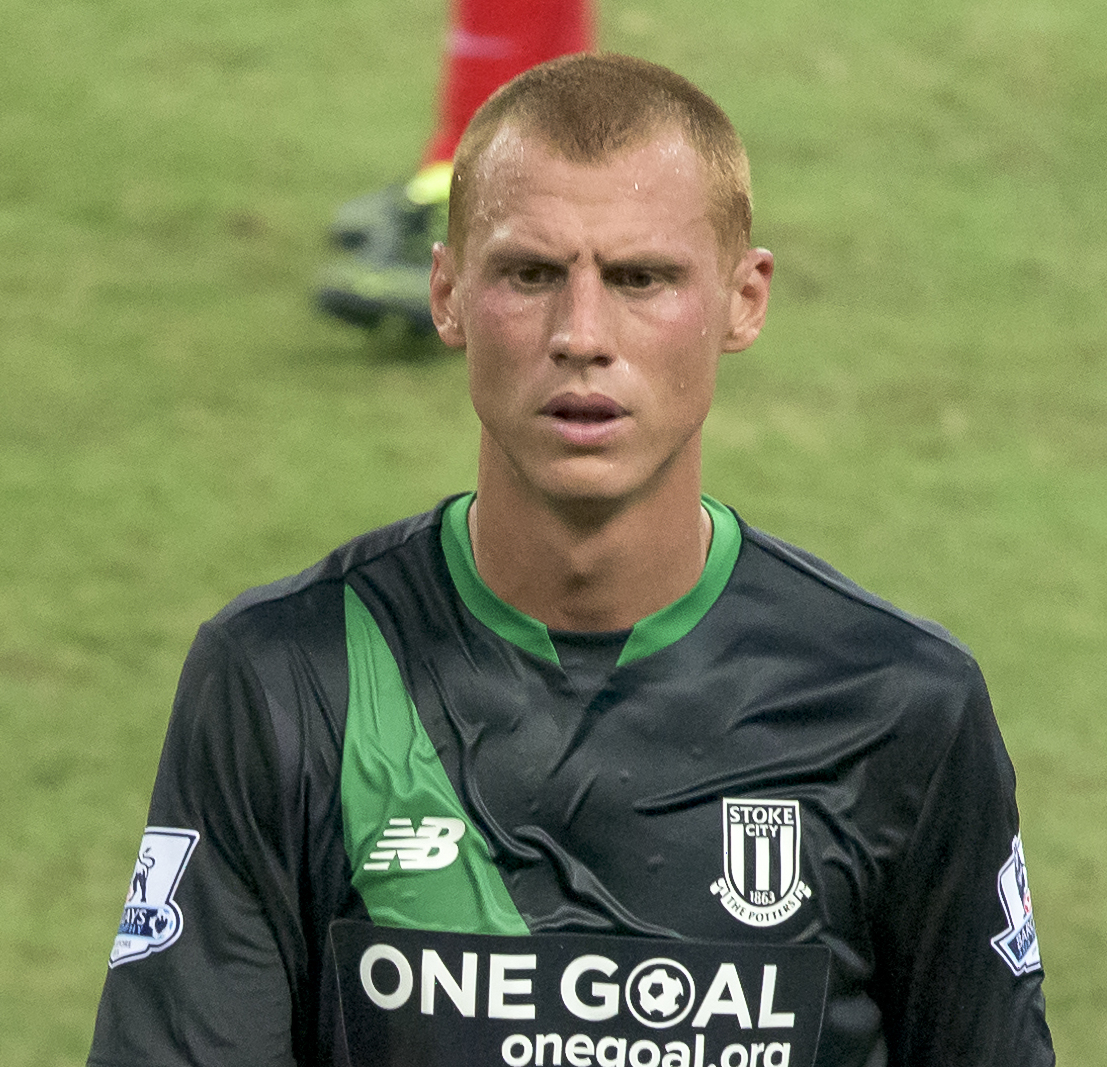
- Sidwell playing for Stoke City in 2015

Personal information
- Full name: Steven James Sidwell
- Date of birth: 14 December 1982 (age 43)
- Place of birth: Wandsworth, England
- Height: 5 ft 10 in (1.78 m)
- Position: Midfielder

Youth career
- Chipstead
- 1997–2001: Arsenal

Senior career*
| Years | Team | Apps | (Gls) |
| 2001–2003 | Arsenal | 0 | (0) |
| 2001–2002 | → Brentford (loan) | 30 | (4) |
| 2002 | → Beveren (loan) | 0 | (0) |
| 2002–2003 | → Brighton & Hove Albion (loan) | 12 | (5) |
| 2003–2007 | Reading | 168 | (29) |
| 2007–2008 | Chelsea | 15 | (0) |
| 2008–2011 | Aston Villa | 45 | (3) |
| 2011–2014 | Fulham | 92 | (14) |
| 2014–2016 | Stoke City | 13 | (0) |
| 2016 | → Brighton & Hove Albion (loan) | 16 | (1) |
| 2016–2018 | Brighton & Hove Albion | 34 | (1) |
| Total | | 425 | (57) |

International career
| 2001–2002 | England U20 | 2 | (0) |
| 2003 | England U21 | 5 | (0) |
- * Club domestic league appearances and goals

Steven James Sidwell (born 14 December 1982) is an English former professional footballer who played as a midfielder.

Sidwell was a product of the Arsenal academy, and after winning two FA Youth Cups, he had constructive loan spells at Brentford and Brighton & Hove Albion, but never broke into the Arsenal first team. He came to prominence in the Championship with Reading after a January 2003 move to the Royals and spent 4 1/2 years with the club, helping them to earn promotion to the Premier League for the first time ever in 2005–06.

He joined Chelsea on a free transfer for the 2007–08 season, however opportunities were limited at Stamford Bridge, as he competed with players such as Frank Lampard, Michael Ballack, Claude Makélélé, and Michael Essien for playing time in central midfield. He moved to Aston Villa in July 2008 for a fee of £5 million. In his 2 1/2-year stay at Villa Park he played 64 times, scoring four goals. Sidwell then spent 3 1/2 years at Fulham, making 115 appearances scoring 17 goals. His time at Craven Cottage ended after the club was relegated from the Premier League in 2013–14, and he subsequently joined Stoke City in June 2014 on a free transfer. He made only 13 Premier League appearances for the club, and finished his career with a two year spell at Brighton & Hove Albion, initially on loan, retiring in 2018.

== Career ==
=== Arsenal ===
Sidwell was born in Wandsworth, London. He began at non-league club Chipstead before joining Arsenal at the age of 9 and was a part of the youth team that won the FA Youth Cup in 2000 and 2001. One of his teammates during these years was James Harper, who he would go on to play with at Reading. Sidwell spent the 2001–02 season on loan at Brentford where he played 35 times scoring four goals as Brentford lost 2–0 to Stoke City in the play-off final. After originally having been sent on loan to Beveren, but not being able to obtain a first team place in preseason, he began the 2002–03 season on loan at Brighton & Hove Albion for whom he scored five goals in 12 appearances. In January 2003 Brighton and Stoke City both had bids for Sidwell rejected by Arsenal but an offer from Reading was accepted.

=== Reading ===
Sidwell moved to Reading for an undisclosed fee on a 4 1/2-year deal in January 2003. He made his debut for Reading on 29 January 2003 in a 3–1 defeat against Leicester City. In his next match on 11 February 2003 he scored twice in a 5–2 victory over Burnley. Sidwell played 15 times in 2002–03 as Reading reached the play-offs where they lost out to Wolverhampton Wanderers. Sidwell made a good start to the 2003–04 season, scoring in the first three matches. Sidwell was sent-off for the first time in his career on 27 March 2004 for two-bookable offences against Coventry City. Reading failed to make the play-offs in 2003–04 finishing in ninth position with Sidwell playing in 48 matches scoring nine goals. Sidwell signed a new three-year contract with Reading in July 2004.

In the 2004–05 season Sidwell played 47 times, scoring five goals as Reading again miss out on a play-off spot finishing in 7th position. During the season FourFourTwo Magazine voted him the best player outside the Premier League and he was later named in the PFA Team of the Year. The 2005–06 season saw Reading finally gain promotion to the Premier League and they did so in emphatic style finishing 1st with 106 points. Sidwell played in 40 matches scoring ten goals and his performances again earned him a place in the PFA Team of the Year.

In the summer of 2006, Sidwell rejected a contract extension, which was set to expire at the end of the 2006–07 season. Reading resisted the chance to cash in on Sidwell and he scored on the opening day of the season, a 3–2 victory over Middlesbrough. On 10 February 2007, Sidwell scored both goals in a 2–0 win over Aston Villa. Over the course of the season, he was linked with a number of high-profile clubs, including Tottenham Hotspur and Chelsea as Reading enjoyed a successful season in the Premier League. In total Sidwell played 37 times in 2006–07 scoring four goals as Reading finished in 8th position narrowly missing out on a UEFA Cup spot. At the end of the season Reading manager Steve Coppell confirmed that Sidwell had agreed to join another club.

=== Chelsea ===
Sidwell joined Chelsea on 1 July 2007 on a free transfer from Reading, and was given squad number 9 for the 2007–08 season. In his first interview after joining Chelsea, Sidwell stated that he had not come to Chelsea to 'make up the numbers', and that he believed training and playing alongside top players like Michael Essien and Frank Lampard would only help him improve. After playing in the club's pre-season tour of the United States, Sidwell then played in the 2007 FA Community Shield where Chelsea lost on penalties to Manchester United. His league debut for Chelsea came on 12 August 2007 in a 3–2 victory against Birmingham City when he replaced Florent Malouda in the 83rd minute.

He scored his only goal for the club on 26 September 2007, in a 4–0 win away to Hull City in the third round of the Football League Cup. Sidwell struggled to establish himself in Chelsea's first team under José Mourinho and made a total of 25 appearances in 2007–08. At the end of the season, Sidwell became linked to several Premier League clubs, including Everton, Aston Villa and Middlesbrough.

=== Aston Villa ===
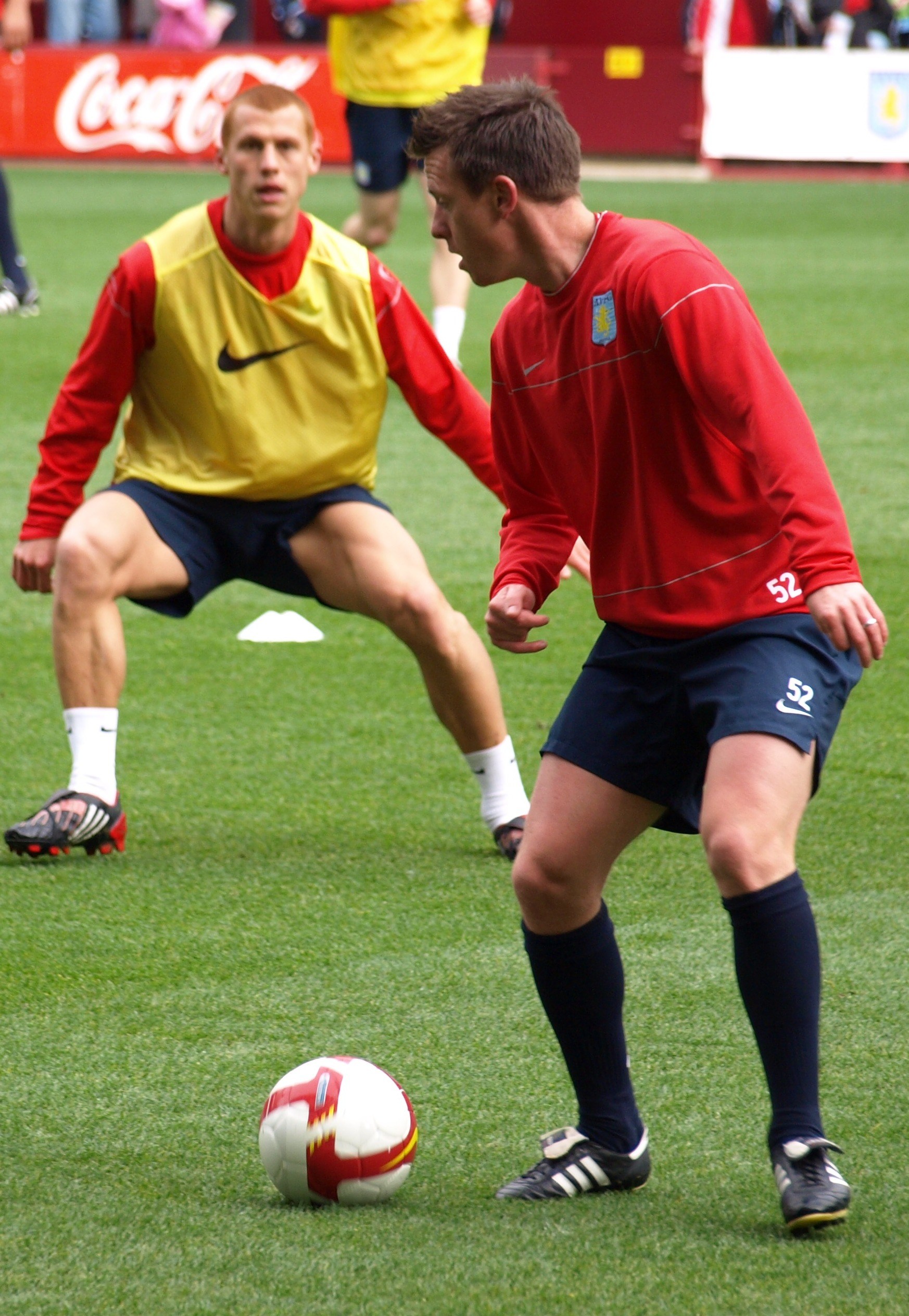
Steve Sidwell (left) and Nicky Shorey (right) during an open training session at Villa Park

On 10 July 2008, Sidwell signed a three-year deal with Aston Villa for an undisclosed fee, believed to be in the region of £5m. He made his debut for the club in a pre-season game against FC Zürich, playing the first 45 minutes, in a match which Villa lost 2–1. Sidwell scored an own goal on his competitive debut for Villa on 19 July 2008 in a 2–2 draw with Odense BK in the UEFA Intertoto Cup. Villa won the second leg 1–0 to progress in Europe but Sidwell picked up a calf injury. He returned to action against Stoke City Reserves on 3 September 2008 but then picked up a knee injury. Sidwell eventually played his first Premier League game for Villa on 26 October 2008 where he came on as a substitute and scored in a 4–0 win away at Wigan Athletic.

On 9 November 2008, Sidwell scored against Middlesbrough but then gifted Tuncay a late goal with a poor back pass as Villa lost 2–1. He was backed by Villa captain Martin Laursen to move on from his mistake. Sidwell scored his third goal of the season just 34 seconds into a game against Everton on 7 December 2008, Villa went on to win 3–2. Sidwell was sent-off against Hamburger SV in the UEFA Cup on 17 December 2008 for two-bookable offences. Sidwell picked up a hamstring injury against CSKA Moscow on 26 February 2009. His injury kept him out until the final match of the season against Newcastle United on 24 May 2009. In total Sidwell played 25 times in 2008–09 as Villa finished in 6th position.

Villa had a mixed start to the 2009–10 season as they were knocked out of Europe by SK Rapid Wien but then went on to beat Liverpool 3–1 at Anfield. Sidwell was used sparingly by manager Martin O'Neill throughout 2009–10 as Sidwell made 33 appearances with 19 of those coming as a substitute. Sidwell missed the start of the 2010–11 season with an Achilles tendon injury. Upon his return from injury he was involved in a challenge which left Wolverhampton Wanderers midfielder Adlène Guedioura with a broken leg. In November 2010 Sidwell again suffered an Achilles tendon injury which ruled him out for six weeks. In January 2011, Sidwell was close to a transfer to West Ham United but the move was cancelled as it would have breached the Premier League's 25-man squad rule. Sidwell also held talks with Wolverhampton Wanderers before agreeing to join Fulham.

=== Fulham ===
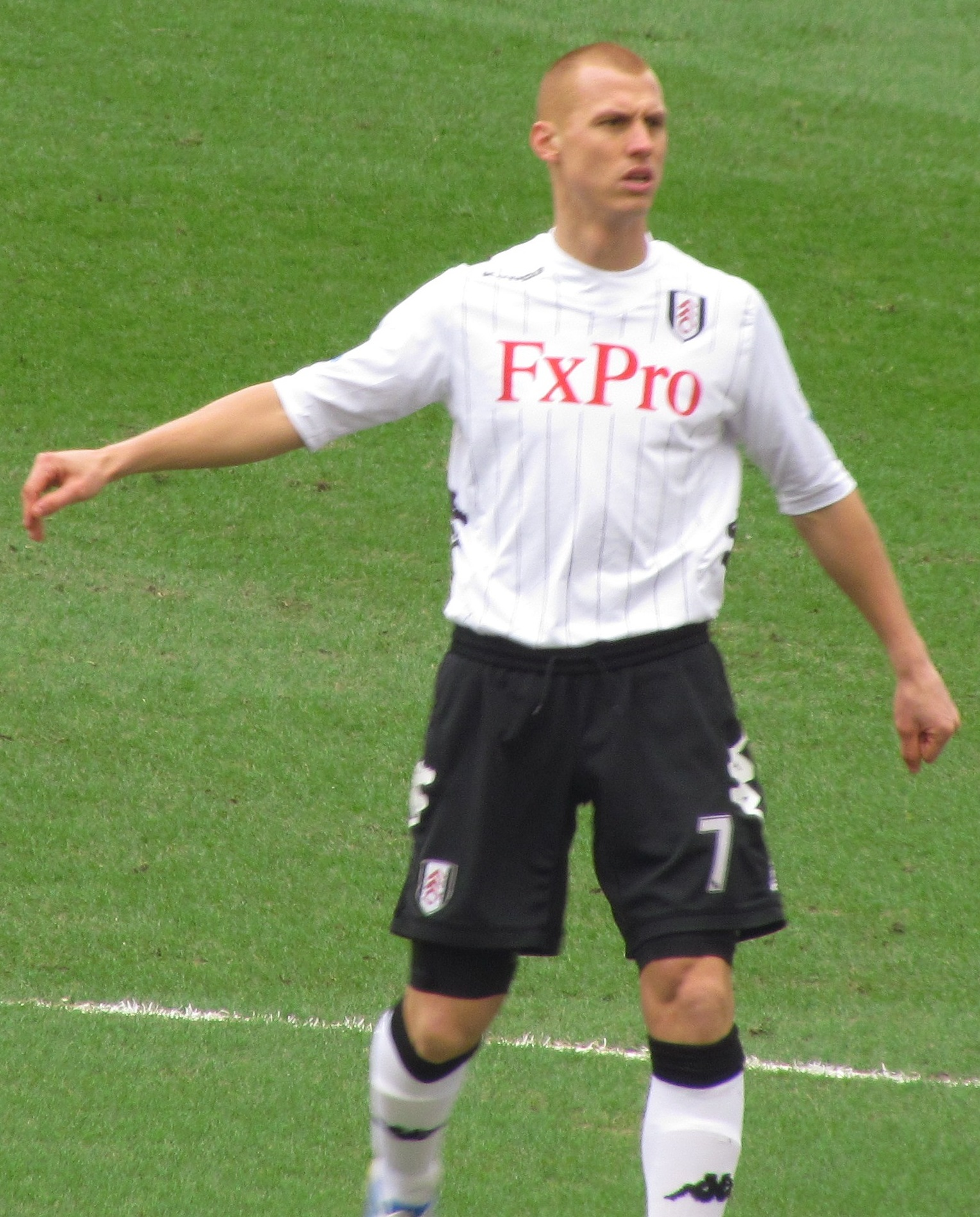
Sidwell featuring for Fulham in 2013

Sidwell signed for Fulham on 7 January 2011, signing a six-month contract with a view to extending it for a further three years. He made his debut for Fulham on 22 January 2011 in a 2–0 win against Stoke City. On 18 April 2011, Sidwell's contract was extended until the summer of 2014. Sidwell ended the 2010–11 season with goals against Liverpool and Arsenal. In 2011–12 Sidwell played in 28 matches in all competitions before his season was ended in February 2012 due to a hernia injury. Sidwell marked his return by scoring a penalty in a 5–0 victory against Norwich City on the opening day of the 2012–13 season. He scored late goals against West Bromwich Albion and Everton. Fulham went on to have an uneventful 2012–13 season as they finished in 12th position with 43 points, Sidwell playing in 31 matches. Sidwell did have a poor end to his campaign as he was sent-off on 1 April 2013 against Queens Park Rangers for a late tackle on Armand Traoré.

After returning from suspension against Arsenal on 20 April 2013 he was again sent-off this time for a lunge on Mikel Arteta. Fulham made a poor start to the 2013–14 season which saw manager Martin Jol sacked in December 2013 to be replaced by René Meulensteen. Sidwell's own performances improved drastically under Meulensteen, scoring five of his eight goals that season during Meulensteen's tenure. Following the dropping of Brede Hangeland and Scott Parker, and the transfer of Dimitar Berbatov, Sidwell was promoted to the role of captain in February 2014. However, two games later, Meulensteen was sacked and Felix Magath was placed in charge. Hangeland was reinstated to the team, and as a result, Sidwell lost the captaincy. There was no change in Fulham's fortunes, and after a 4–1 defeat away at Stoke City on 3 May 2014 their relegation to the Championship was confirmed. Following Fulham's relegation, Sidwell criticised his team's performance. On 23 May 2014, Sidwell was released by Fulham.

=== Stoke City ===
On 9 June 2014 Sidwell joined Stoke City on a two-year contract. Upon signing for Stoke, Sidwell stated – "There were two factors behind my decision to join Stoke – the first being the fact that it's a club that is really moving forward. I was really impressed with the football Stoke played last season; the way they played against Fulham on the penultimate weekend of the season really had a wow factor about it and it led to a first ever top 10 finish in the Premier League. Then there's the manager (Mark Hughes) because he's a man that I have the highest regard for. He signed me for Fulham and I really enjoyed the time I worked with him there". He made his debut for Stoke on 24 August 2014 in a 1–1 draw away at Hull City. After making just one start in his first two months with the club Sidwell admitted that competition for places is stronger than he anticipated. On 1 December 2014, Sidwell tore a knee ligament against Liverpool which ruled him out for a proportion of the season. He made 16 appearances for Stoke in the 2014–15 season, ten of which were as a substitute. Sidwell admitted that he had been disappointed by his lack of game time. He was released by Stoke at the end of the 2015–16 season.

=== Brighton & Hove Albion ===
On 25 January 2016, Sidwell joined Brighton & Hove Albion on loan until the end of the 2015–16 season. Sidwell played 18 times for the Seagulls scoring once as they finished in 3rd position, losing out to Sheffield Wednesday in the play-offs. Following his release by Stoke, Sidwell signed a one-year contract with Brighton. On 5 November 2016, Sidwell scored from 50 yards in a 2–0 win against Bristol City. He was a big part of Brighton's success to gain automatic promotion to the Premier League.

Sidwell missed the whole of the 2017–18 season due to back and ankle injuries.

=== Retirement ===
Sidwell announced his retirement as a player in August 2018, taking up roles as an ambassador and youth development coach at his final club, Brighton & Hove Albion. He is now a regular co-host of That Peter Crouch Podcast, alongside Peter Crouch and Chris Stark. The weekly show is one of the most listened to podcasts in the UK.

== International career ==
In 2001, he was capped by England U20's. After making his debut for England U21 in 2003, he received a total of 5 caps.

== Personal life ==
Sidwell married Krystell on 19 June 2005. Within days of returning from their honeymoon, he had a tattoo of the wedding vows he had written for her placed on his back.

Sidwell has a sister, Louise, and a brother, Lee. Lee played non-League football between 1996 and 2010, and one of his clubs was AFC Wimbledon during the 2002–03 campaign, their inaugural season in the Combined Counties Football League.

Sidwell grew up as a Crystal Palace supporter but started following Arsenal after joining them as a schoolboy.

== Career statistics ==
As of end of 2017–18 season

| Club | Season | League | | | FA Cup | | League Cup | | Europe | | Other | | Total | |
| Club | Season | Division | Apps | Goals | Apps | Goals | Apps | Goals | Apps | Goals | Apps | Goals | Apps | Goals |
|---|---|---|---|---|---|---|---|---|---|---|---|---|---|---|
| Arsenal | 2001–02 | Premier League | 0 | 0 | 0 | 0 | 0 | 0 | 0 | 0 | — | | 0 | 0 |
| Arsenal | 2002–03 | Premier League | 0 | 0 | 0 | 0 | 0 | 0 | 0 | 0 | 0 | 0 | 0 | 0 |
| Arsenal | Total | | 0 | 0 | 0 | 0 | 0 | 0 | 0 | 0 | 0 | 0 | 0 | 0 |
| Brentford (loan) | 2001–02 | Second Division | 30 | 4 | 2 | 0 | — | | — | | 3 (Note: Appearances in Football League play-offs) | 0 | 35 | 4 |
| Beveren (loan) | 2002–03 | Belgian First Division | 0 | 0 | 0 | 0 | — | | — | | — | | 0 | 0 |
| Brighton & Hove Albion (loan) | 2002–03 | First Division | 12 | 5 | 0 | 0 | — | | — | | — | | 12 | 5 |
| Reading | 2002–03 | First Division | 13 | 2 | — | | — | | — | | 2 | 0 | 15 | 2 |
| Reading | 2003–04 | First Division | 43 | 8 | 2 | 0 | 3 | 1 | — | | — | | 48 | 9 |
| Reading | 2004–05 | Championship | 44 | 5 | 2 | 0 | 1 | 0 | — | | — | | 47 | 5 |
| Reading | 2005–06 | Championship | 33 | 10 | 4 | 0 | 3 | 0 | — | | — | | 40 | 10 |
| Reading | 2006–07 | Premier League | 35 | 4 | 2 | 0 | 0 | 0 | — | | — | | 37 | 4 |
| Reading | Total | | 168 | 29 | 10 | 0 | 7 | 1 | — | | 2 | 0 | 187 | 30 |
| Chelsea | 2007–08 | Premier League | 15 | 0 | 3 | 0 | 5 | 1 | 1 (Note: Appearance in UEFA Champions League) | 0 | 1 (Note: Appearance in FA Community Shield) | 0 | 25 | 1 |
| Aston Villa | 2008–09 | Premier League | 16 | 3 | 4 | 1 | 0 | 0 | 5 (Note: Two appearances in UEFA Intertoto Cup, three in UEFA Cup) | 0 | — | | 25 | 4 |
| Aston Villa | 2009–10 | Premier League | 25 | 0 | 4 | 0 | 3 | 0 | 1 (Note: Appearance(s) in UEFA Europa League) | 0 | — | | 33 | 0 |
| Aston Villa | 2010–11 | Premier League | 4 | 0 | — | | 2 | 0 | 0 | 0 | — | | 6 | 0 |
| Aston Villa | Total | | 45 | 3 | 8 | 1 | 5 | 0 | 6 | 0 | — | | 64 | 4 |
| Fulham | 2010–11 | Premier League | 12 | 2 | 2 | 0 | — | | — | | — | | 14 | 2 |
| Fulham | 2011–12 | Premier League | 14 | 1 | 2 | 0 | 1 | 0 | 11 | 2 | — | | 28 | 3 |
| Fulham | 2012–13 | Premier League | 28 | 4 | 2 | 0 | 1 | 0 | — | | — | | 31 | 4 |
| Fulham | 2013–14 | Premier League | 38 | 7 | 2 | 1 | 1 | 0 | — | | — | | 41 | 8 |
| Fulham | Total | | 92 | 14 | 8 | 1 | 3 | 0 | 11 | 2 | — | | 114 | 17 |
| Stoke City | 2014–15 | Premier League | 12 | 0 | 3 | 0 | 1 | 0 | — | | — | | 16 | 0 |
| Stoke City | 2015–16 | Premier League | 1 | 0 | 1 | 0 | 2 | 0 | — | | — | | 4 | 0 |
| Stoke City | Total | | 13 | 0 | 4 | 0 | 3 | 0 | — | | — | | 20 | 0 |
| Brighton & Hove Albion (loan) | 2015–16 | Championship | 16 | 1 | — | | — | | — | | 2 | 0 | 18 | 1 |
| Brighton & Hove Albion | 2016–17 | Championship | 34 | 1 | 2 | 0 | 1 | 0 | — | | — | | 37 | 1 |
| Brighton & Hove Albion | 2017–18 | Premier League | 0 | 0 | 0 | 0 | 0 | 0 | — | | — | | 0 | 0 |
| Brighton & Hove Albion | Total | | 50 | 2 | 2 | 0 | 1 | 0 | — | | 2 | 0 | 55 | 2 |
| Career total | | | 425 | 57 | 37 | 2 | 24 | 2 | 18 | 2 | 8 | 0 | 512 | 63 |

== Honours ==
Arsenal Youth

- FA Youth Cup: 2000, 2001

Reading

- Football League Championship: 2005–06

Aston Villa

- Football League Cup runner-up: 2009–10

Brighton & Hove Albion

- EFL Championship runner-up: 2016–17

Individual

- PFA Team of the Year: 2004–05 Football League Championship, 2005–06 Football League Championship
- Football League Championship Player of the Month: September 2004
