= Steve Melton =

English footballer

Personal information
- Full name: Stephen Melton
- Date of birth: 3 October 1978 (age 48)
- Place of birth: Lincoln, England
- Height: 5 ft 11 in (1.80 m)
- Position: Midfielder

Senior career*
Years	Team	Apps	(Gls)
1996–2000	Nottingham Forest	3	(0)
2000	Stoke City	6	(0)
2000–2002	Brighton & Hove Albion	46	(3)
2002	→ Hull City (loan)	7	(0)
2002–2004	Hull City	23	(0)
2004–2006	Boston United	21	(1)
2005–2006	→ Tamworth (loan)	7	(1)
2006–2008	King's Lynn	45	(5)
2008–2009	Boston United		
2009–2011	Lincoln United		
2011	Lincoln Moorlands Railway		
2011–2012	Grantham Town		
2012	Worksop Town		
2012–2013	Lincoln United		
- * Club domestic league appearances and goals

Stephen Melton (born 3 October 1978) is an English former footballer who played as a midfielder.

He played as a professional in the Football League from 1996 until 2006, featuring for Nottingham Forest, Stoke City, Brighton & Hove Albion, Hull City and Boston United. At Non-League level he has represented Tamworth and King's Lynn before re-joining Boston United and then moving on to Lincoln United, Lincoln Moorlands Railway and Grantham Town.

== Career ==
Born in Lincoln, Melton started his career back in 1996 as a trainee with Nottingham Forest. He made his debut for Forest in the Premier League on the last day of the 1998-99 season against Leicester City. Melton only appeared for Forest on three occasions in the league before moving on to Stoke City in February 2000. At Stoke, he made seven appearances in 1999–2000 and was an unused substitute in the 2000 Football League Trophy Final. He joined Brighton & Hove Albion in the summer of 2000. Melton managed to find his way into the starting eleven and played 46 league games in which he scored three goals. In November 2002, he joined Hull City after spending time on loan with the club. Although he never scored in a competitive game for Hull City, he was the first player to score at their Kingston Communications Stadium in a friendly against Sunderland to commemorate the stadium's opening on 18 December 2002.

Melton joined Boston United in March 2004 on a contract until summer 2005. During his time with The Pilgrims, Melton was sent out on loan to Conference National side Tamworth. He was released by Boston United in summer 2006. Melton joined King's Lynn in 2006. He re-signed for Boston United in September 2008, but was released at the end of the season. Melton went on trial with Retford United in July 2009, but subsequently joined Lincoln United alongside former King's Lynn and Boston United teammate Matt O'Halloran. In February 2011 he signed with Lincoln Moorlands Railway. He joined Grantham Town in the summer.

== Career statistics ==
Appearances and goals by club, season and competition
Club	Season	League			FA Cup		League Cup		Other^{[A]}		Total	
Club	Season	Division	Apps	Goals	Apps	Goals	Apps	Goals	Apps	Goals	Apps	Goals
Nottingham Forest	1998–99	Premier League	1	0	0	0	0	0	0	0	1	0
Nottingham Forest	1999–2000	First Division	2	0	0	0	1	0	0	0	3	0
Stoke City	1999–2000	Second Division	5	0	0	0	0	0	2	0	7	0
Brighton & Hove Albion	2000–01	Third Division	28	1	0	0	1	0	2	0	31	1
Brighton & Hove Albion	2001–02	Second Division	10	2	0	0	1	0	3	0	14	2
Brighton & Hove Albion	2002–03	First Division	8	0	0	0	2	0	0	0	10	0
Hull City	2002–03	Third Division	25	0	0	0	0	0	0	0	25	0
Hull City	2003–04	Third Division	5	0	0	0	1	0	2	0	8	0
Boston United	2003–04	Third Division	25	0	0	0	0	0	0	0	25	0
Boston United	2004–05	League Two	9	1	0	0	0	0	0	0	9	1
Boston United	2005–06	League Two	3	0	0	0	0	0	0	0	3	0
Tamworth	2005–06	Conference Premier	7	1	3	0	0	0	0	0	10	1
Career Total			128	5	3	0	6	0	9	0	148	5

A. The "Other" column constitutes appearances and goals in the Football League play-offs, and Football League Trophy.

== Honours ==
Stoke City

- Football League Trophy: 1999–2000

Brighton & Hove Albion

- Football League Third Division: 2000–01
