= Geoff Pitcher =

English footballer

Personal information
- Full name: Geoffrey Pitcher
- Date of birth: 15 August 1975 (age 51)
- Place of birth: Sutton, Berkshire, England
- Height: 1.70 m (5 ft 7 in)
- Position: Midfielder

Youth career
- Millwall

Senior career*
Years	Team	Apps	(Gls)
1993–1994	Millwall	0	(0)
1994–1996	Watford	13	(2)
1996	Carshalton Athletic		
1996–1997	Kingstonian		
1997	Colchester United	1	(0)
1997–2001	Kingstonian	152	(30)
2001–2004	Brighton & Hove Albion	10	(0)
2002	→ Woking (loan)	13	(2)
2002	→ Dagenham & Redbridge (loan)	1	(0)
2003	→ Farnborough Town (loan)	10	(4)
2003	→ Stevenage Borough (loan)	5	(0)
2003	→ Woking (loan)	3	(0)
2003–2004	→ Barnet (loan)	5	(1)
2004	→ Farnborough Town (loan)	3	(0)
2004	→ Havant & Waterlooville (loan)	6	(0)
2004–2005	Havant & Waterlooville	22	(2)
2005–2006	Sutton United	14	(1)
2006	Kingstonian	5	(0)
2006–2007	Haywards Heath		
2007	Burgess Hill Town		
2007–2008	St Francis Rangers		
2008–2009	Haywards Heath		
2009–2010	St Francis Rangers		
2010–2011	Tooting & Mitcham United	5	(3)

International career
	England C	10	
- * Club domestic league appearances and goals

Geoffrey Pitcher (born 15 August 1975) is an English former professional footballer who played as a midfielder.

== Career ==
=== Early career ===
Born in Sutton, Berkshire, Pitcher played in The Football League for Millwall, though he made no league first team appearances, and Watford, before being released after Watford's relegation to Division Two. He moved into non-league with Carshalton Athletic, before joining Kingstonian and making his debut for The K's on 16 November 1996 against Bishop's Stortford. He moved briefly back up to professional football with Colchester United, making one substitute appearance, before returning to Kingstonian in 1997. He contributed two goals to Kingstonian's 2000–01 FA Cup run in wins against Brentford and Southport, helping The K's reach the fourth round proper.

=== Brighton & Hove Albion ===
He joined Brighton & Hove Albion after a three-year stint at Kingstonian, with the Second Division club reportedly paying a transfer fee somewhere between £25,000 and £50,000. The move marked a return to professional football, as Pitcher had been training at most two times a week with Kingstonian, while working as a builder. His career with Brighton started well, and he was involved in Bobby Zamora's goal in The Seagulls' 3–0 friendly win against Folkestone Invicta.

He was eased into the squad by manager Micky Adams, making three substitute appearances before his full debut came away against Wrexham on Friday 14 September 2001, followed by another start against Stoke City the following Tuesday. He struggled with injuries during his time at Brighton, first suffering a recurrence of a wrist injury he had sustained at Kingstonian in November 2001, before a heel injury kept him out for a prolonged period of time.

With the arrival of David Lee from Hull City, Pitcher saw his already-limited playing time further decrease, and he moved on loan to Woking in January 2002. After continuing to struggle with the persistent heel injury, Pitcher returned to reserve team football with Brighton briefly in November 2002, before being loaned to Dagenham & Redbridge in the same month – though he only managed one appearance due to injury, with Brighton manager Steve Coppell describing the loan as "a nonsense."

A relatively successful loan spell with Farnborough Town was followed by less-successful loan stints at Stevenage Borough, Woking and Barnet, before a second loan spell Farnborough Town, where he only made three appearances. His last loan spell came in February 2004, when he joined Southern Football League club Havant & Waterlooville on a short-term deal. He was released by Brighton at the end of the 2003–04 season.

=== Later career ===
Following his departure from Brighton, he joined Havant & Waterlooville on a permanent basis, but after being injured during the season, it was reported that he was close to mutually terminating his contract with the club. He joined Sutton United in 2005, marking his debut against Weston-super-Mare on 3 September with a goal in a 2–1 home loss. He briefly returned to Kingstonian, making five appearances. He then retired to focus on becoming a firefighter and property developer, while playing for amateur club Haywards Heath, before returning to the semi-professional game in February 2007 with Ryman League club Burgess Hill Town.

He joined St Francis Rangers for the 2007–08 edition of the Sussex County Football League, before returning to Haywards Heath the following season. He spent the 2009–10 season back with St Francis Rangers, before moving to Tooting & Mitcham United in 2010, serving occasionally as captain as well as assistant manager to Mark Beard. He made at least five appearances, scoring three goals. The pair were sacked in December 2011.

== Career statistics ==
Appearances and goals by club, season and competition
Club	Season	League			National Cup (Note: Includes FA Cup and qualifying rounds)		League Cup (Note: Includes Football League Cup, Alan Turvey Trophy and the Bob Lord Trophy)		Other		Total	
Club	Season	Division	Apps	Goals	Apps	Goals	Apps	Goals	Apps	Goals	Apps	Goals
Millwall	1993–94	First Division	0	0	0	0	0	0	—		0	0
Watford	1994–95	First Division	13	2	2	0	2	0	—		17	2
Watford	1995–96	First Division	13	2	2	0	2	0	—		17	2
Colchester United	1996–97	Third Division	1	0	0	0	0	0	—		1	0
Kingstonian	1997–98	Isthmian League	40	9	4	1	1	0	10 (Note: One appearance in the FA Trophy, two appearances in the FMC and seven appearances and one goal in the Surrey Senior Cup)	1	55	10
Kingstonian	1998–99	Football Conference	38	5	6	0	1	0	14 (Note: One appearance and one goal in the Charity Shield, eight appearances and one goal in the FA Trophy and five appearances and one goal in the Surrey Senior Cup)	3	59	8
Kingstonian	1999–00	Football Conference	39	9	3	0	3	0	14 (Note: One appearance in the Charity Shield, eight appearances and three goals in the FA Trophy and five appearances and one goal in the Surrey Senior Cup)	4	59	13
Kingstonian	2000–01	Football Conference	35	7	6	5	2	1	4 (Note: Three appearances and three goals in the FA Trophy and one appearance in the Surrey Senior Cup)	3	47	16
Kingstonian	Total		152	30	19	6	7	1	42	11	220	48
Brighton & Hove Albion	2001–02	Second Division	10	0	0	0	0	0	3 (Note: Appearances in the FA Trophy)	1	13	1
Brighton & Hove Albion	2002–03	First Division	0	0	0	0	0	0	0	0	0	0
Brighton & Hove Albion	2003–04	Second Division	0	0	0	0	0	0	0	0	0	0
Brighton & Hove Albion	Total		10	0	0	0	0	0	3	1	13	1
Woking (loan)	2001–02	Football Conference	13	2	0	0	0	0	—		13	2
Dagenham & Redbridge (loan)	2002–03	Football Conference	1	0	0	0	0	0	—		1	0
Farnborough Town (loan)	2002–03	Football Conference	10	4	0	0	0	0	—		10	4
Stevenage Borough (loan)	2003–04	Football Conference	5	0	0	0	0	0	—		5	0
Woking (loan)	2003–04	Football Conference	3	0	0	0	0	0	—		3	0
Barnet (loan)	2003–04	Football Conference	5	1	0	0	0	0	—		5	1
Farnborough Town (loan)	2003–04	Football Conference	3	0	0	0	0	0	—		3	0
Havant & Waterlooville (loan)	2003–04	Southern Football League	6	0	0	0	0	0	—		6	0
Havant & Waterlooville	2004–05	Conference South	19	2	0	0	0	0	2	0	21	2
Havant & Waterlooville	2005–06	Conference South	3	0	0	0	0	0	0	0	3	0
Havant & Waterlooville	Total		28	2	0	0	0	0	2	0	30	2
Sutton United	2005–06	Conference South	14	1	0	0	0	0	–		14	1
Kingstonian	2005–06	Isthmian League	5	0	0	0	0	0	–		5	0
Tooting & Mitcham United	2010–11	Isthmian League	5	3	0	0	0	0	–		5	3
Career total			268	45	21	6	9	1	47	12	345	64

== Honours ==
=== Club ===
Millwall

- FA Youth Cup Runner-up (1): 1993–94

Kingstonian

- FA Trophy Winner (2): 1998–99, 1999–2000
- Conference League Cup Runner-up (1): 1999–2000
- Conference Shield Winner (1): 1999–2000
- Conference Shield Runner-up (1): 2000–2001
