= Lee Steele =

English footballer

Personal information
- Date of birth: 2 December 1973 (age 52)
- Place of birth: Liverpool, England
- Position: Striker

Senior career*
Years	Team	Apps	(Gls)
–1996	Bootle	30	(21)
1996–1997	Northwich Victoria	51	(21)
1997–2000	Shrewsbury Town	119	(40)
2000–2002	Brighton & Hove Albion	70	(12)
2002–2004	Oxford United	26	(4)
2004–2006	Leyton Orient	86	(27)
2006–2007	Chester City	24	(3)
2007–2009	Northwich Victoria	48	(17)
2009	→ Barrow (loan)	7	(0)
2009–2012	Oxford City	80	(46)
2012	Nantwich Town	1	(0)
2012	Leamington	6	(5)
Total		548	(195)
- * Club domestic league appearances and goals

Lee Steele (born 2 December 1973) is an English former professional footballer who played as a striker.

== Career ==
His other former clubs include Leyton Orient, Oxford United, Brighton & Hove Albion, Shrewsbury Town, Oxford City and Nantwich Town. At Brighton, Steele had a successful spell and contributed to the club's back to back promotions, winning the League Two championship in 2000–01 and League One in 2001–02.

Steele joined Orient in 2004, he was a fans' favourite at Brisbane Road, with chants of "Steelo!" regularly heard round the ground. He scored a hat-trick away at Lincoln in a 4–3 victory in October 2004 helping him secure the League 2 Player of the Month award. He scored Orient's fastest ever goal timed at 12 seconds against Oxford United (04/05) as well as the final goal for Orient in the 2005–06 season, again against Oxford United in the last minute to achieve promotion for the East London side in a 3–2 win and confirm his former club's relegation to the Football Conference.

Steele eventually decided to travel back to the North West and join Chester City in October 2006, initially on loan. The move was made permanent in January 2007 but Steele was told in July 2007 that he was available for transfer after failing to settle at the club. His most memorable game for Chester was in an FA Cup second round tie at Bury on 2 December 2006, when he appeared as a half-time substitute, scored twice and was sent off for two bookings – the latter when celebrating his second goal. Unfortunately, Steele only managed one other goal in his time with the Blues; against Mansfield Town.

He signed for Northwich Victoria on a 2-year deal, where fans were hoping he could repeat his excellent form of his first spell prior to playing in the Football League. He didn't let them down. Struggling with injury until February, Northwich were rock bottom of the Conference National but the impact upon his return was immediate with Steele scoring nine goals in eight games rescuing the team from relegation and earning him the Player of the Year and Players Player of the Year awards for that season. He originally joined the club from Bootle in March 1996, just two months before he played at Wembley Stadium in the final of the FA Trophy against Macclesfield Town. He joined Conference National side Barrow on loan on 18 February 2009 before spending the 2009–10 season back in Oxford, this time playing for Oxford City. He marked his Ashton United debut with the only goal of the game in 1–0 win over Burscough. On 1 November 2010 Steele announced his return to Oxford City but was sacked on 11 January 2012 for making a homophobic remark on the social media website Twitter about gay Welsh rugby star Gareth Thomas.

On 14 January 2012, Steele joined Northern Premier League club Nantwich Town, making his debut on the same day.

After working as a fitness coach privately since the end of his playing career, Steele teamed up with his ex-teammate at Brighton, Lee Johnson, Oldham Athletic manager, to become fitness coach at the club.

== Honours ==
Northwich Victoria

- FA Trophy runner-up: 1995–96

Brighton & Hove Albion

- Football League Second Division: 2001–02
- Football League Third Division: 2000–01

Leyton Orient

- Football League Two third-place promotion: 2005–06
