= Dan Marney =

English footballer

Personal information
- Full name: Daniel Marney
- Date of birth: 2 October 1981 (age 45)
- Place of birth: Sidcup, England
- Height: 5 ft 9 in (1.75 m)
- Position: Forward

Youth career
- 199?–2001: Brighton & Hove Albion

Senior career*
Years	Team	Apps	(Gls)
2001–2004	Brighton & Hove Albion	15	(0)
2002–2003	→ Southend United (loan)	17	(0)
2003–2004	→ Crawley Town (loan)	10	(5)
2004–2005	Crawley Town	26	(5)
2005–2006	Eastbourne Borough	35	(3)
2006	→ Worthing (loan)	?	(?)
2006	Bognor Regis Town	?	(?)
- * Club domestic league appearances and goals as of 21:23, 28 June 2009 (UTC)

Daniel Marney (born 2 October 1981) is a professional footballer who played as a forward in the Football League for Brighton & Hove Albion and Southend United on loan. He dropped into non-League football with Crawley Town on loan in 2003, before joining them on a permanent basis in 2004. He went on to join Eastbourne Borough, Worthing on loan and Bognor Regis Town.

== Career ==
Marney started his career as a youth player at Brighton & Hove Albion, making his debut on 10 August 2001 in the First Division against Burnley in the 3–1 away win replacing Bobby Zamora, in 86th minute. He joined Southend United on loan in December 2002, making his debut in the 3–1 away defeat to Torquay United in the Third Division, replacing Tony Scully in the 76th minute. He went on to make 17 appearances for Southend in the Third Division, before joining Crawley Town on loan the following season, 2003–04 on loan. Marney signed on a permanent basis for Crawley Town in April 2004.

He signed for Eastbourne Borough in the summer of 2005, before joining Worthing on loan in January 2006. Having made 35 appearances for the team, Eastbourne released Marney at the end of the 2006 season. Marney then joined Bognor Regis Town, before being released in November 2006.
