= Robbie Herrera =

English footballer (born 1970)

Personal information
- Full name: Roberto Herrera
- Date of birth: 12 June 1970 (age 56)
- Place of birth: Torquay, England
- Position: Left-back

Youth career
- ?–1988: Queens Park Rangers

Senior career*
Years	Team	Apps	(Gls)
1988–1993	Queens Park Rangers	6	(0)
1992	→ Torquay United (loan)	11	(0)
1992	→ Torquay United (loan)	5	(0)
1993–1998	Fulham	144	(2)
1998–2001	Torquay United	107	(1)
2001	Leyton Orient	2	(0)
2001–2002	Grays Athletic		
2002	Merthyr Tydfil		
2002–2003	Taunton Town		
2003–2006	Bideford		
2006–2007	Torrington		
- Bideford
Total		275	(3)

Managerial career
- 2006–2007: Torrington
- 2015–2017: Torquay United (assistant)
- 2017: Torquay United (caretaker)
- 2018–2019: Plymouth Argyle (Youth Coach)
- 2020: Dorchester Town (First Team Coach)
- 2020-: Dorchester Town
- * Club domestic league appearances and goals

Roberto "Robbie" Herrera (born 12 June 1970) is an English former professional footballer, who is currently head of the youth team at Torquay United.

== Playing career ==
Herrera, born and raised in Torquay, South Devon, and registered as a schoolboy with his local side Torquay United, began his career as an apprentice with Queens Park Rangers, turning professional on 1 March 1988. His league debut came as a substitute on 14 January 1989 in an away defeat against Wimbledon, but future appearances proved to be hard to come by.

Herrera returned to Torquay United on loan on 17 March 1992, playing 11 league games. A further loan spell at Plainmoor followed on 24 October 1992, Herrera returning to the QPR reserves after five games. On 29 October 1993, he made the short move from Loftus Road to Fulham, where he eventually made 144 league appearances, scoring twice. After helping Fulham to promotion from Division 3 in 1997, Herrera lost his place to former QPR colleague Rufus Brevett, as the ambitions of their owner Mohamed Al Fayed became apparent, ambitions that would see the London side in the Premiership within four years.

The situation surrounding Herrera's move to Fulham was a unique one. During a time of financial frailty for Fulham, chairman Jimmy Hill came out in front of the crowd and said that they had identified a full back from Queens Park Rangers who he and the manager thought would improve the team. Hill asked that Fulham fans contribute what they can towards the £60,000 for the signing of this full back and the following game Herrera was paraded in front of the crowd with the rumour being that film star Hugh Grant had stumped up the transfer fee. It was later revealed that director Cyril Swain had actually funded the transfer.

On 4 August 1998, he signed for Torquay for a fee of £30,000, his solid defending and quick attacking instincts helping to establish him in the team. However, a recurring groin injury caused him to miss games, and during the 2000–01 season he found it difficult to sustain himself as a first team regular, not playing at all after 31 March. Although his form was not good, he was played as a wing-back by Wes Saunders, and not in his natural full-back position. It was little surprise that Herrera was one of the three players released at the end of the 2000–01 season. He had played 104 league games, scoring one goal against Rochdale, in his third spell at the club.

Surprisingly, given his poor showing the previous season, Herrera was invited back to Plainmoor on trial by new manager Roy McFarland, playing in the 2–0 win away to Newton Abbot on 25 July 2001. On 8 August he signed a three-month contract, and played in the opening game of the season away to Bristol Rovers. Two further appearances followed, but he then slipped out of the reckoning and was released on 17 September.

He joined Leyton Orient on trial on 1 October, signing a one-month contract two days later as manager Tommy Taylor wanted cover for the injured Matthew Lockwood. Taylor was sacked soon after, but Herrera impressed new manager Paul Brush enough to earn a second month's contract beginning on 5 November, despite being out with first a back injury and then a toe injury. He was released by Orient later that month and joined non-league Grays Athletic.

In December 2005, Herrera joined Leroy Rosenior's Merthyr Tydfil, moving on to Taunton Town, managed by former Torquay player Russell Musker in August 2002. He left Taunton in the summer of 2003 to join Bideford, managed by another former Torquay player Sean William Joyce.

In March 2006 he joined another North Devon side Torrington, taking over as player-manager the following month. Herrera resigned in February 2007 after a 7–0 defeat against Melksham Town, and returned to Bideford as a player only.

== Coaching career ==
After ending his playing career, Herrera worked with Torquay United's youth team, and held coaching positions as well as being the club's College Co-Ordinator. In September 2009, following United winger Saul Halpin's graduation to the first team, then-chief executive Colin Lee hailed Herrera's contribution to the college scheme, saying "Robbie has done a fantastic job, and he's been a big reason for the course's success on the football side." As part of his involvement with Torquay's youth team, Herrera occasionally refereed matches between their U-18s and the youth sides of other clubs. Herrera was relieved of his youth team duties with Torquay United in the summer of 2014, as part of the club closing their youth academy.

When Kevin Nicholson announced as player-manager of Torquay United in early October 2015, Robbie rejoined the club as Nicholson's assistant manager. Kevin Nicholson described Herrera to BBC Sport as someone "I trust and someone who I know will do everything in his power to be a success with the attitude and personality that I want about the place." In August 2017 Nicholson was sacked by Torquay, and Herrera was appointed as caretaker manager. He took charge of six of the Gulls' games, drawing two and losing four. Shortly after the appointment of Gary Owers as full-time manager, Herrera left Torquay.

In March 2018 Herrera was appointed as professional development coach at Plymouth Argyle, dealing with players aged 17 to 21. This job was vacant after Shaun Taylor had left the role to join Herrera's old club Torquay United's re-opened Youth Academy as head of academy coaching. In 2020, Herrera was appointed both first team coach and head of development at Southern League South side Dorchester Town.
