= Shaun Wilkinson =

English footballer

Personal information
- Full name: Shaun Wilkinson
- Date of birth: 12 September 1981 (age 45)
- Place of birth: Portsmouth, England
- Position: Midfielder

Senior career*
Years	Team	Apps	(Gls)
1999–2004	Brighton & Hove Albion	17	(0)
2002	→ Chesterfield (loan)	1	(0)
2003-2006	Weymouth F.C.	67	(4)
2006-2011	Havant & Waterlooville F.C.	104	(4)
2011-2012	Eastleigh F.C.	4	(0)
- * Club domestic league appearances and goals

Shaun Wilkinson (born 12 September 1981) is an English former footballer who played in the Football League for Brighton & Hove Albion and Chesterfield. He later played in non-league football for Weymouth F.C., Havant & Waterlooville F.C., and Eastleigh F.C.
