= Will Packham =

English footballer

Personal information
- Date of birth: 13 January 1981 (age 45)
- Place of birth: Brighton, England
- Position: Goalkeeper

Youth career
- 1998–2000: Brighton & Hove Albion F.C

Senior career*
Years	Team	Apps	(Gls)
2000–2003	Brighton & Hove Albion	4	(0)
2003	Farnborough	2	(0)
2004	Worthing		
2004	Bognor Regis Town		
2005–2006	Fisher Athletic		
- * Club domestic league appearances and goals

Will Packham (born 13 January 1981) is an English former footballer who played in the Football League for Brighton & Hove Albion. After leaving Brighton in July 2003 Packham went on to play for a number of non-league teams.
