= Simon Stewart (footballer) =

English footballer

Personal information
- Full name: Simon Andrew Stewart
- Date of birth: 1 November 1973 (age 53)
- Place of birth: Leeds, England
- Position: Central defender

Senior career*
Years	Team	Apps	(Gls)
1990–1996	Sheffield Wednesday	7	(0)
1995	→ Shrewsbury Town (loan)	4	(0)
1996–1998	Fulham	4	(0)
1998–2001	Kingstonian	128	(12)
1998	→ Woking (loan)	6	(0)
- * Club domestic league appearances and goals

Simon Stewart (born 1 November 1973) was an English football defender.
