= David Lee (footballer, born 1980) =

English footballer

Personal information
- Date of birth: 28 March 1980 (age 46)
- Place of birth: Basildon, England
- Height: 5 ft 11 in (1.80 m)
- Position: Midfielder

Youth career
- –1998: Tottenham Hotspur

Senior career*
Years	Team	Apps	(Gls)
1998–2000	Tottenham Hotspur	0	(0)
2000–2001	Southend United	42	(8)
2001–2002	Hull City	11	(1)
2002–2004	Brighton & Hove Albion	6	(0)
2002	→ Bristol Rovers (loan)	5	(0)
2003	→ Thurrock (loan)	?	(?)
2004–2005	Oldham Athletic	7	(0)
2005	Thurrock	?	(?)
2005	Stevenage Borough	1	(0)
2005–2007	Aldershot Town	24	(1)
2008–2009	Canvey Island	?	(?)
- * Club domestic league appearances and goals

David Lee (born 28 March 1980) is an English former professional footballer who played as a midfielder. He last played for Canvey Island in 2009.

== Career ==
Born in Basildon, Lee has played with Tottenham Hotspur, Southend United, Hull City (where he scored once against York City), Brighton & Hove Albion, Bristol Rovers, Thurrock, Oldham Athletic, Stevenage Borough, Aldershot Town and Canvey Island.
