= Simon Morgan =

English footballer (born 1966)

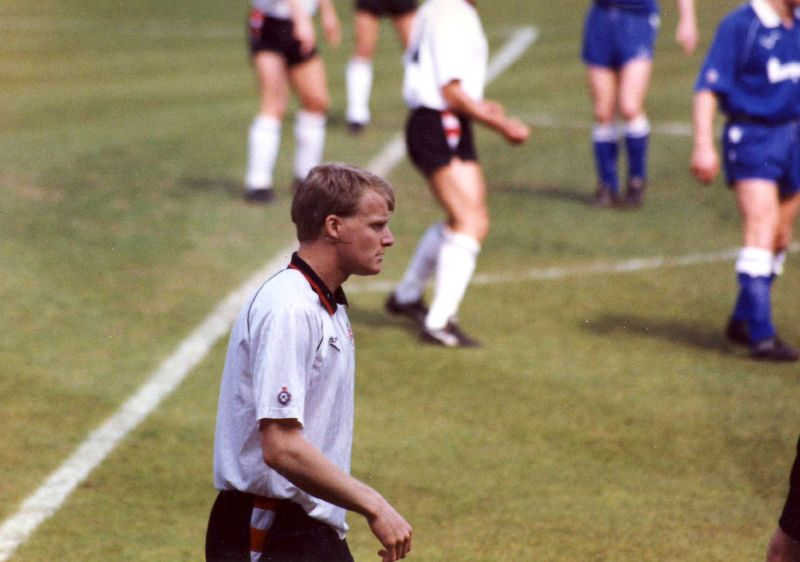

Personal information
- Date of birth: 5 September 1966 (age 60)
- Place of birth: Birmingham, England
- Height: 5 ft 11 in (1.80 m)
- Position: Defender

Senior career*
Years	Team	Apps	(Gls)
1984–1990	Leicester City	160	(3)
1990–2001	Fulham	352	(47)
2001–2002	Brighton & Hove Albion	42	(1)

International career
1986	England U21	2	(0)
- * Club domestic league appearances and goals

Simon Morgan (born 5 September 1966) is an English former professional footballer who played as a defender for Fulham and Leicester City. He also represented England at Under 21 level, playing two matches in 1986.

== Career ==
Morgan was born in Birmingham. He began his football career with Leicester City, representing them in the First and Second Divisions of The Football League, before being bought to then Second Division Fulham in October 1990 by Alan Dicks. The Cottagers finished 21st in Morgan's first season there (avoiding relegation by two points), and 9th in his second season (during which the club replaced Dicks with Don Mackay and missed out on the play-offs by four points) with a squad which Morgan felt "should have got promoted but for one reason or another we blew it". However, a 12th-placed finish in 1992–93 was followed by the club slipping to 18th with nine matches remaining of the 1993–94 season, as a result of which Mackay was replaced by Ray Lewington, and after going through these managerial changes, Fulham were relegated to the Third Division.

After finishing within three points of the play-offs in 1994–95 under Ian Branfoot, the club had slipped to 23rd by February 1996, and eventually appointed Micky Adams as manager, who helped them finish 17th. The team was promoted to the Second Division in 1997. The club was then bought by Mohamed Al Fayed, which was followed by Fulham's rise into the Premier League in 2001, with Morgan playing an integral role in a back line alongside Welsh international defenders Chris Coleman, Andy Melville and Kit Symons. In January 1999, as runaway leaders of Division 2 (tier 3 of the football pyramid), Fulham secured a shock 2 - 0 victory away at Villa Park to knock a full strength Aston Villa - then top of the Premier League - out of the FA cup. Morgan, a Birmingham City FC supporter from a family of Aston Villa fans, scored the first goal after 8 minutes, with Steve Hayward adding the second just before half time. Due to injury, Morgan only played once in Fulham's victorious 2000–01 Division One campaign, coming on as a substitute against Wolverhampton Wanderers, which earned him the Man of the Match award despite playing only 13 minutes. Known for his unwavering loyalty and humble personality, he is still affectionately referred to as "Mr Fulham" by Fulham fans.

Morgan was granted a testimonial year in the 2000–01 season. This included a special edition of Fulham fanzine TOOFIF, called "There's Only One Simon Morgan" (TOOSM), and culminated in a friendly match against Spurs, supported by a Fulham vs. Chelsea veterans' game (in which his son played). Morgan was unable to participate in the Spurs match due to injury, but kicked the match off before being shown a pre-arranged red card by referee Graham Poll.

Morgan then went to play at Brighton & Hove Albion for a season, scoring once against Northampton, before bringing his playing career to an end in 2002. After retiring he rejoined Fulham as head of the club's community scheme. He left the club in 2007 to become the Premier League's Head of Community Development.

== Honours ==
Fulham

- Football League Second Division: 1998–99

Brighton & Hove Albion

- Football League Second Division: 2001–02
