= Paul Watson (footballer, born 1975) =

English footballer

Personal information
- Full name: Paul Douglas Watson
- Date of birth: 4 January 1975 (age 51)
- Place of birth: Hastings, England
- Position: Full-back

Senior career*
Years	Team	Apps	(Gls)
1992–1996	Gillingham	72	(2)
1996–1997	Fulham	55	(5)
1997–1999	Brentford	48	(1)
1999–2005	Brighton & Hove Albion	215	(19)
2005	Coventry City	2	(0)
2005–2006	Woking	17	(3)
2006–2007	Rushden & Diamonds	43	(2)
2007–2008	Crawley Town	11	(0)
2008–2009	Bognor Regis Town	8	(2)
2009	Rye United		
- * Club domestic league appearances and goals

Paul Douglas Watson (born 4 January 1975) is an English former footballer who played as a full-back.

During his career, Watson played for Gillingham, Fulham, Brentford, Coventry City and most notably for Brighton & Hove Albion before dropping into non-League football and playing for Woking, Rushden & Diamonds, Crawley Town and finally Bognor Regis Town.

After retiring from football, Watson studied a part-time course at Brunel University in physiotherapy. He was appointed as Brighton & Hove Albion's assistant physiotherapist on 11 June 2009. He was appointed Head of First Team Physiotherapy in 2017. He was appointed head of Sheffield United's medical team at the start of the 2017–18 season where, after gaining promotion to the Premier League in 2018–19, in their first season they shared the best injury record in the league with Wolverhampton Wanderers.

== Honours ==
Brentford

- Football League Third Division: 1998–99

Brighton & Hove Albion

- Football League Second Division: 2001–02
- Football League Third Division: 2000–01
