= Richard Carpenter (footballer) =

English professional footballer

Personal information
- Date of birth: 30 September 1972 (age 54)
- Place of birth: Sheerness, England
- Position: Midfielder

Youth career
- Gillingham

Senior career*
Years	Team	Apps	(Gls)
1991–1996	Gillingham	122	(4)
1996–1998	Fulham	58	(7)
1998–2000	Cardiff City	75	(2)
2000–2007	Brighton & Hove Albion	252	(20)
2007–2008	Welling United		
2010–2011	Whitehawk	11	(1)

Managerial career
- 2008: Welling United (caretaker manager)
- * Club domestic league appearances and goals

Richard Carpenter (born 30 September 1972) is an English footballer, born in Sheerness, who played as a midfielder for Gillingham, Fulham, Cardiff City and Brighton & Hove Albion. He made more than 500 appearances in the Football League over a 15-year professional career.

== Career ==
Carpenter began his football career with Gillingham, and was part of the team promoted to Division Two in the 1995–96 season. He went on to make more than 250 appearances for Brighton & Hove Albion, and captained the side. In 2004, Carpenter was required to pay undisclosed damages to Chris Casper following a tackle in a league match on Boxing Day 1999, during his time playing for Cardiff City, that left Casper with a double fracture to his leg that subsequently saw him retire from professional football.

In February 2007 his contract was terminated by mutual consent, and he signed for Conference South club Welling United, where he became club captain and briefly caretaker manager, before leaving the club at the end of the 2007–08 season.

In February 2010, Carpenter played a one-off game for Whitehawk in a sixth round FA Vase tie at Gresley Rovers to solve an injury crisis, as a favour for the Hawks' manager Darren Freeman. He then came out of retirement to play for Whitehawk during their first season in Isthmian League Division One South.

== Personal life ==
In 2012, Carpenter was sentenced to 200 hours of community service after pleading guilty to an assault charge following a brawl in The Red Lion pub in Hernhill.

== Honours ==
Brighton & Hove Albion

- Football League Second Division: 2001–02; play-offs: 2004
- Football League Third Division: 2000–01
