= Danny Cullip =

English footballer

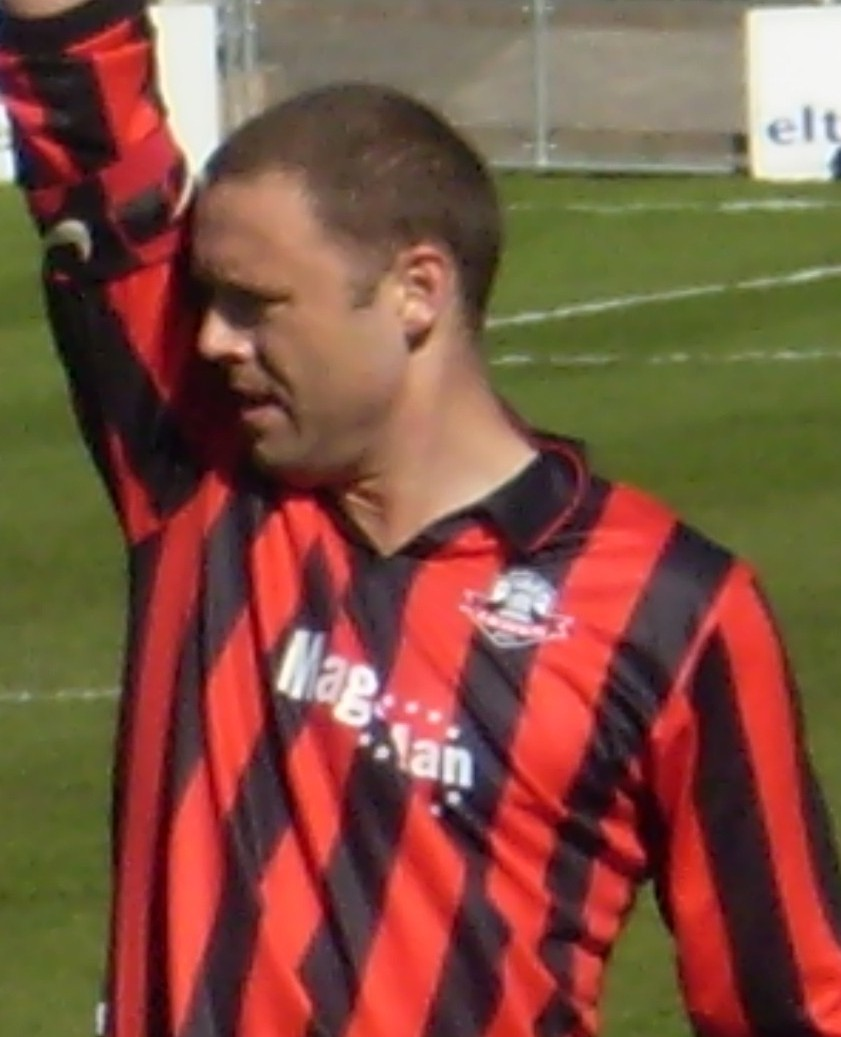
- Cullip playing for Lewes

Personal information
- Full name: Daniel Cullip
- Date of birth: 17 September 1976 (age 50)
- Place of birth: Bracknell, England
- Height: 6 ft 1 in (1.85 m)
- Position: Defender

Senior career*
Years	Team	Apps	(Gls)
1995–1996	Oxford United	0	(0)
1996–1998	Fulham	50	(2)
1998–1999	Brentford	15	(0)
1999	→ Brighton & Hove Albion (loan)	4	(1)
1999–2004	Brighton & Hove Albion	213	(6)
2004–2005	Sheffield United	11	(0)
2005	→ Watford (loan)	4	(0)
2005–2007	Nottingham Forest	31	(0)
2007–2008	Queens Park Rangers	19	(0)
2008	Gillingham	11	(0)
2008–2010	Lewes	36	(0)
Total		394	(9)
- * Club domestic league appearances and goals

Danny Cullip (born 17 September 1976) is an English former professional footballer. Cullip, a centre-back, made more than 350 appearances in the Football League, including more than 200 appearances for Brighton & Hove Albion.

== Career ==
Cullip was born in Bracknell. He began his career with Oxford United but left the club in 1996 before playing his first game, signing for Fulham, who were then in Division 3, manager Micky Adams guided Fulham to 2nd place in the league and promotion in that season. Cullip played 41 games in 18 months at Craven Cottage before signing for Brentford in February 1998 for £75,000. Cullip was at Brentford for the rest of the 97–98 season playing 15 times for the club, in September 1998 he was sent on a month's loan to Brighton and the four games he played convinced them to spend £50,000 securing his services. During his time at Brighton, he became something of a hero, being crowned their Player of the Year on two occasions. Cullip played in total 212 games for the Sussex club scoring six times. Cullip rejected the offer of a new contract at Brighton in December 2004 and joined Sheffield United for a fee of £250,000, scoring his first goal for Sheffield United in the memorable 3–1 FA Cup win over Aston Villa. Three months later in March 2005, he joined Watford on loan as part of the deal that took Danny Webber to Bramall Lane.

Cullip joined Nottingham Forest for an undisclosed fee in August 2005, signing a three-year contract. Partially owing to the lack of a pre-season with the club Cullip picked up several injuries at the beginning of his City Ground career, most notably to his hamstrings; however when selected he was a valued member of the central defence at the club. The injuries restricted him to just nine starts in the 2005–6 season as Forest struggled. In 2006-7 Cullip began as an integral part of Colin Calderwood's three man defence (alongside Ian Breckin and Wes Morgan) and started Forest's first eight games (during which the side only conceded two goals – one of which to Cullip's former side Brighton) – however against Yeovil Cullip picked up yet another injury and was substituted after 23 minutes.

Cullip moved to Championship club Queens Park Rangers in January 2007 on an 18-month contract. After becoming surplus to requirements under Luigi De Canio, his contract was terminated with immediate effect. In February 2008, two months after being released by Queens Park Rangers, he joined Gillingham on a non contract basis until the end of the 2007–08 season. He made his debut on 23 February in a 1–0 home win over Huddersfield Town. He left Gillingham at the end of the 2007–08 season. He joined Conference National club Lewes in July 2008, but after one season with the club, sustained a hamstring injury which eventually forced his retirement in March 2010.

Cullip is now working as a coach for Brighton & Hove Albion whilst also helping out at Worthing College running their academy 2nd team.

== Honours ==
Brighton & Hove Albion

- Football League Second Division: 2001–02; play-offs: 2004
- Football League Third Division: 2000–01

Individual

- PFA Team of the Year: 2000–01 Third Division, 2001–02 Second Division, 2003–04 Second Division
