= 2007–08 Brighton & Hove Albion F.C. season =

106th season in existence of Brighton & Hove Albion

Brighton & Hove Albion
2007–2008 season
- Chairman: Dick Knight
- Manager: Dean Wilkins
- League One: 7th
- FA Cup: Third Round
- League Cup: First Round
- Football League Trophy: Southern Semi-Final
- Top goalscorer: Nicky Forster (19 goals)
- Highest home attendance: 8,691 vs. Leeds
- Lowest home attendance: 1,995 vs Barnet
Home colours	Away colours

The 2007–08 season was Brighton & Hove Albion's 106th year in existence and second consecutive season in League One. Along with competing in League One, the club also participated in the FA Cup and the League Cup. The Seagulls finished 7th in League One, missing out on the promotion play-offs by seven points. As a result, manager Dean Wilkins was replaced by Micky Adams at the end of the season, and left the club after being offered a role as first-team coach.

== First Team Squad ==
No.	Name	Nat.	Place of birth	Date of birth	Previous club	Date joined	Notes
2	Andy Whing	(England)	Birmingham	20 September 1984	Coventry City	7 June 2007	
3	Kerry Mayo	(England)	Cuckfield	21 September 1977	N/A	1 August 1995	
4	Adam Hinshelwood	(England)	Oxford	8 January 1984	N/A	10 August 2002	
5	Joel Lynch	(England)	Eastbourne	3 October 1987	N/A	1 October 2004	
6	Adam El-Abd	(Egypt)	Brighton	11 September 1984	N/A	1 July 2003	
7	Dean Cox	(England)	Cuckfield	12 August 1987	N/A	1 July 2004	
8	Alex Revell	(England)	Cambridge	7 July 1983	Braintree Town	1 July 2006	Joined Southend on 30 January 2008
8	Ian Westlake (on loan)	(England)	Clacton-on-Sea	10 July 1983	Leeds United	3 March 2008	
9	Nicky Forster	(England)	Caterham	8 September 1973	Hull City	25 June 2007	
10	Steven Thomson	(Scotland)	Glasgow	23 January 1978	Falkirk	14 January 2008	
11	Dean Hammond	(England)	Hastings	7 March 1983	N/A	1998	Joined Colchester on 30 January 2008
11	Dean Bowditch (on loan)	(England)	Bishop's Stortford	15 June 1986	Ipswich Town	11 February 2008	Returned to Ipswich on 11 March 2008
11	Therry Racon (on loan)	(France)	Villeneuve-Saint-Georges	1 May 1984	Charlton Athletic	20 March 2008	
12	Gary Hart	(England)	Harlow	21 September 1976	Stansted	1 August 1998	
13	John Sullivan	(England)	Brighton	8 March 1988	N/A	26 December 2005	
14	Guy Butters	(England)	Hillingdon	30 October 1969	Gillingham	29 August 2002	
15	Paul Reid	(Australia)	Sydney	6 July 1979	Bradford City	1 March 2004	
16	Michel Kuipers	(Netherlands)	Amsterdam	26 June 1974	Bristol Rovers	27 June 2000	
17	Glenn Murray	(England)	Maryport	25 September 1983	Rochdale	29 January 2008	
17	Bas Savage	(England)	Wandsworth	7 January 1982	Gillingham	2 February 2007	Left the club on 30 December 2007.
18	Sam Rents	(England)	Brighton	22 June 1987	N/A	1 July 2006	
19	Jake Robinson	(England)	Brighton	23 October 1986	N/A	1 July 2003	
20	Joe Gatting	(England)	Brighton	25 November 1987	N/A	2 January 2006	Loaned out to Woking
21	Jonny Dixon	(Spain)	Murcia	16 January 1984	Aldershot Town	30 January 2008	
21	Nathan Elder	(England)	Hornchurch	5 April 1985	Billericay Town	1 January 2007	Joined Brentford on 30 January 2008.
22	Tom Fraser	(England)	Brighton	5 December 1987	N/A	1 July 2006	
23	Doug Loft	(England)	Maidstone	25 December 1986	Hastings United	1 July 2005	
24	Tommy Elphick	(England)	Brighton	7 September 1987	N/A	1 July 2005	
25	Scott Chamberlain	(England)	Maryport	15 January 1988	N/A	1 July 2006	
26	Wes Fogden	(England)	Brighton	12 April 1988	N/A	July 2004	Loaned to Dorchester Town and Bognor Regis Town
27	David Martot	(France)	Fécamp	1 February 1981	Le Havre (on loan)	31 August 2007	
28	Matt Richards	(England)	Harlow	26 December 1984	Ipswich Town (on loan)	18 September 2007	
31	Shane McFaul	(Republic of Ireland)	Dublin	23 May 1986	UCD	11 January 2008	
32	Chris Winterton	(England)	Eastbourne	19 November 1988	N/A	1 July 2005	Loaned to Burgess Hill
33	Sam Gargan	(England)	Brighton	24 January 1989	N/A	1 July 2005	Loaned to Worthing, Bognor Regis Town and Welling
37	Lloyd Skinner	(England)	Brighton	9 September 1988	N/A	1 July 2005	

== Competitions ==
=== League One ===
==== Results ====
11 August 2007	Crewe Alexandra	2–1	Brighton & Hove Albion	Gresty Road, Crewe
15:00	Roberts 22' (pen.), 79'		Cox 14'	Attendance: 5,394; Referee: Steve Bratt

18 August 2007	Brighton & Hove Albion	2–1	Northampton Town	Withdean Stadium, Brighton
15:00	Hammond 2' (pen.); Revell 66'		Kirk 23'	Attendance: 5,137; Referee: Mick Thorpe

25 August 2007	Tranmere Rovers	2–0	Brighton & Hove Albion	Prenton Park, Birkenhead
15:00	Greenacre 78'; Shuker 90'			Attendance: 5,670; Referee: Graham Salisbury

1 September 2007	Brighton & Hove Albion	3–2	Southend United	Withdean Stadium, Brighton
15:00	Forster 75', 85'; Hammond 90'		McCormack 40'; Bailey 78'	Attendance: 5,670; Referee: Mick Russell

7 September 2007	Brighton & Hove Albion	3–0	Millwall	Withdean Stadium, Brighton
19:45	Hammond 12' (pen.); Cox 19'; Martot 78'			Attendance: 6,563; Referee: Dean Whitestone

15 September 2007	Gillingham	1–0	Brighton & Hove Albion	Priestfield Stadium, Gillingham
15:00	Facey 78'			Attendance: 6,118; Referee: Ray Lee

22 September 2007	Brighton & Hove Albion	1–2	Yeovil Town	Withdean Stadium, Brighton
15:00	Hammond 61' (pen.)		Owusu 15'; Warne 43'	Attendance: 5,231; Referee: Fred Graham

29 September 2007	Swansea City	0–0	Brighton & Hove Albion	Liberty Stadium, Swansea
13:00				Attendance: 11,058; Referee: Mike Jones

2 October 2007	A.F.C. Bournemouth	0–2	Brighton & Hove Albion	Fitness First Stadium, Bournemouth
19:45			Cox 46'; Savage 66'	Attendance: 4,638; Referee: Jamail Singh

6 October 2007	Brighton & Hove Albion	0–0	Bristol Rovers	Withdean Stadium, Brighton
15:00				Attendance: 5'820; Referee: Andy D'Urso

13 October 2007	Port Vale	0–1	Brighton & Hove Albion	Vale Park, Stoke-on-Trent
13:00			Revell 64'	Attendance: 3,490; Referee: Mark Haywood

20 October 2007	Brighton & Hove Albion	0–1	Leeds United	Withdean Stadium, Brighton
15:00			Kandol 79'	Attendance: 8,691; Referee: Paul Taylor

27 October 2007	Hartlepool United	1–2	Brighton & Hove Albion	Victoria Park, Hartlepool
15:00	Barker 86'		Nelson (own goal) 14'; Savage 90'	Attendance: 5,619; Referee: Jonathan Moss

3 November 2007	Brighton & Hove Albion	3–1	Luton Town	Withdean Stadium, Brighton
15:00	Savage 40'; Forster 69', 85'		Edwards 79'; Goodall (red card) 84'	Attendance: 5,317; Referee: Darren Deadman

6 November 2007	Brighton & Hove Albion	1–1	Walsall	Withdean Stadium, Brighton
19:45	Robinson 36'		Demontagnac 78'	Attendance: 4,717; Referee: Pat Miller

17 October 2007	Leyton Orient	2–2	Brighton & Hove Albion	Brisbane Road, London
12:30	Gray 27'; Demetriou 70'		Forster 68'; Cox 75'	Attendance: 6,496; Referee: Anthony Bates

24 November 2007	Brighton & Hove Albion	2–2	Carlisle United	Withdean Stadium, Brighton
15:00	Forster 47', 84'		Hackney 34'; Garner 84'	Attendance: 5,390; Referee: Stuart Attwood

4 December 2007	Doncaster Rovers	0–0	Brighton & Hove Albion	Keepmoat Stadium, Doncaster
19:45				Attendance: 6,215; Referee: Rob Shoebridge

7 December 2007	Brighton & Hove Albion	0–2	Nottingham Forest	Withdean Stadium, Brighton
19:45			Tyson 30', 49'	Attendance: 6,536; Referee: Keith Hill

15 December 2007	Swindon Town	0–3	Brighton & Hove Albion	County Ground, Swindon
15:00			Forster 3'; Robinson 45'; Hammond 73'	Attendance: 6,415; Referee: Steve Cook

26 December 2007	Millwall	3–0	Brighton & Hove Albion	The Den, Bermondsey
13:00	Alexander 7', 54', 71' (pen.)			Attendance: 9,401; Referee: Iain Williamson

29 December 2007	Yeovil Town	2–1	Brighton & Hove Albion	Huish Park, Yeovil
15:00	Dempsey 42'; Stieber 50'		Revell 19'	Attendance: 6,881; Referee: Graham Horwood

1 January 2008	Brighton & Hove Albion	3–2	AFC Bournemouth	Withdean Stadium, Brighton
15:00	Revell 15', 58', 90'		Christophe 24'; Pitman 79'	Attendance: 5,963; Referee: Ray Lee

12 January 2008	Oldham Athletic	1–1	Brighton & Hove Albion	Boundary Park, Oldham
15:00	Hughes 40'		Hammond (red card) 10'; Elder 90'	Attendance: 5,168; Referee: Darren Drysdale

19 January 2008	Brighton & Hove Albion	1–1	Huddersfield Town	Withdean Stadium, Brighton
15:00	Elphick 74'		Williams 77'	Attendance: 5,343; Referee: Roger East

29 January 2008	Northampton Town	1–0	Brighton & Hove Albion	Sixfields Stadium, Northampton
19:45	Hughes 44'			Attendance: 4,657; Referee: Danny McDermid

2 February 2008	Brighton & Hove Albion	3–0	Crewe Alexandra	Withdean Stadium, Brighton
15:00	Murray 23', 45'; Butters 41'			Attendance: 4,802; Referee: Dean Whitestone

9 February 2008	Cheltenham Town	2–1	Brighton & Hove Albion	Whaddon Road, Cheltenham
15:00	Russell 90'; Gillespie 90'		Robinson 55'	Attendance: 6,142; Referee: Andy Hall

12 February 2008	Brighton & Hove Albion	0–0	Tranmere Rovers	Withdean Stadium, Brighton
19:45				Attendance: 4,797; Referee: Pat Miller

19 February 2008	Brighton & Hove Albion	2–1	Cheltenham Town	Withdean Stadium, Brighton
19:45	Murray 80'; Lynch 88'		Brooker 3'	Attendance: 4,395; Referee: Mick Graham

23 February 2008	Brighton & Hove Albion	1–0	Oldham Athletic	Withdean Stadium, Brighton
15:00	Murray 61'			Attendance: 4,815; Referee: Mick Russell

1 March 2008	Brighton & Hove Albion	1–1	Leyton Orient	Withdean Stadium, Brighton
15:00	Forster 90' (pen.)		Ibehre 80'	Attendance: 6,242; Referee: Paul Melin

4 March 2008	Brighton & Hove Albion	4–2	Gillingham	Withdean Stadium, Brighton
19:45	Forster 23'; El-Abd 43'; Elphick 45'; Robinson 68'		Crofts 4', 76'; Richards (red card) 20'; Clohessy (yellow card) 82' (yellow-red card)	Attendance: 6,836; Referee: Mick Thorpe

8 March 2008	Carlisle United	2–0	Brighton & Hove Albion	Brunton Park, Carlisle
15:00	Graham 35'; Livesey 59'			Attendance: 6,793; Referee: Mike Pike

11 March 2008	Walsall	1–2	Brighton & Hove Albion	Bescot Stadium, Walsall
19:45	Gerrard 29'; Taundry (red card) 89'		Forster 34'; Gerrard 79' (o.g.)	Attendance: 4,309; Referee: Anthony Taylor

15 March 2008	Brighton & Hove Albion	1–0	Doncaster Rovers	Withdean Stadium, Brighton
15:00	Forster 57'			Attendance: 6,252; Referee: Danny McDermid

18 March 2008	Huddersfield Town	2–1	Brighton & Hove Albion	Galpharm Stadium, Huddersfield
19:45	Holdsworth 4'; Beckett 79' (pen.)		Forster 47' (pen.)	Attendance: 6,047; Referee: Darren Deadman

22 March 2008	Brighton & Hove Albion	2–1	Swindon Town	Withdean Stadium, Brighton
15:00	Forster 22', 66'		Easton 8'	Attendance: 6,849; Referee: Andy Woolmer

24 March 2008	Nottingham Forest	0–0	Brighton & Hove Albion	City Ground, Nottingham
15:00				Attendance: 18,165; Referee: Nigel Miller

29 March 2008	Leeds United	0–0	Brighton & Hove Albion	Elland Road, Leeds
15:00				Attendance: 22,575; Referee: David Foster

5 April 2008	Brighton & Hove Albion	2–3	Port Vale	Withdean Stadium, Brighton
15:00	Cox 26'; Murray 90'		Richards 12', 19'; Whitaker 87'	Attendance: 4,785; Referee: Paul Armstrong

8 April 2008	Southend United	2–0	Brighton & Hove Albion	Roots Hall, Southend-on-Sea
19:45	Gower 24'; Barrett 30'			Attendance: 8,428; Referee: Grant Hegley

12 April 2008	Luton Town	1–2	Brighton & Hove Albion	Kenilworth Road, Luton
15:00	Parkin 49'		Westlake 51'; Murray 59'	Attendance: 6,652; Referee: Karl Evans

19 April 2008	Brighton & Hove Albion	2–1	Hartlepool United	Withdean Stadium, Brighton
15:00	Murray 38'; Cox 89'		Porter 75'	Attendance: 6,178; Referee: Ray Lee

26 April 2008	Bristol Rovers	0–2	Brighton & Hove Albion	Memorial Stadium, Bristol
15:00			Westlake 71'; Murray 74'	Attendance: 7,590; Referee: Gavin Ward

3 May 2008	Brighton & Hove Albion	0–1	Swansea City	Withdean Stadium, Brighton
15:00			Brandy 78'	Attendance: 7,283; Referee: Anthony Taylor

=== FA Cup ===
Brighton & Hove Albion were knocked out of the FA Cup in the third round with a home defeat to League Two outfit Mansfield Town.

10 November 2007 First round	Cheltenham	1–1	Brighton & Hove Albion	Cheltenham
15:00	Gillespie 78'	Report	Loft 90'	Stadium: Whaddon Road; Attendance: 2,984; Referee: Fred Graham

20 November 2007 First Round Replay	Brighton & Hove Albion	2–1	Cheltenham Town	Brighton
19:45	El-Abd 18'; Hammond 67' (pen.)	Report	Gillespie 67'	Stadium: Withdean Stadium; Attendance: 3,711; Referee: Mick Russell

1 December 2007 Second round	Torquary United	0–2	Brighton & Hove Albion	Torquay
15:00		Report	Forster 63', 90'	Stadium: Plainmoor; Attendance: 4,010; Referee: Iain Williamson

5 January 2008 Third round	Brighton & Hove Albion	1–2	Mansfield Town	Brighton
15:00	Revell 23'	Report	Hamshaw 10'; Holmes 45'	Stadium: Withdean Stadium; Attendance: 5,857; Referee: Richard Beeby

=== Football League Cup ===
Brighton & Hove Albion were knocked out of the Football League Cup in the first round by Championship side Cardiff City.

14 August 2007 First round	Cardiff City	1–0 (a.e.t.)	Brighton & Hove Albion	Cardiff
19:45	Johnson 110'	Report		Stadium: Ninian Park; Attendance: 3,726; Referee: Trevor Kettle

=== Football League Trophy ===
Brighton & Hove Albion received a bye to the Southern area second round and were drawn at home to League Two side Barnet. They were knocked out in the Southern area semi-final by League One champions Swansea City

9 October 2007 Southern Second Round	Brighton & Hove Albion	2–1	Barnet	Brighton
19:45	Robinson 21'; Cox 47'	Report	Birchall 74'	Stadium: Withdean Stadium; Attendance: 1,995; Referee: Andy Hall

14 November 2007 Southern Quarter Final	Brighton & Hove Albion	4–1	Cheltenham	Brighton
19:45	Martot 13'; Forster 37', 87'; Savage 90'	Report	Connor 45'	Stadium: Withdean Stadium; Attendance: 2,490; Referee: Andy Woolmer

8 January 2008 Southern Semi Final	Swansea City	1–0	Brighton & Hove Albion	Swansea
19:45	Duffy 9'	Report		Stadium: Liberty Stadium; Attendance: 6,066; Referee: Jarmail Singh

== Transfers ==
=== Transfers in ===
Date from	No.	Name	From	Fee	Ref.
25 June 2007	9	Nicky Forster	Hull City	£75,000	
1 July 2007	2	Andy Whing	Coventry City	Free	
11 January 2008	31	Shane McFaul	UCD	Free	
14 January 2008	10	Steven Thomson	Falkirk	Undisclosed	
30 January 2008	21	Jonny Dixon	Aldershot Town	£55,000	
30 January 2008	17	Glenn Murray	Rochdale	£300,000	

=== Loans in ===
Date from	No.	Name	From	Ref.
31 August 2007	7	David Martot	Le Havre AC	
31 August 2007	10	George O'Callaghan	Ipswich Town	
18 September 2007	28	Matt Richards	Ipswich Town	
11 February 2008	11	Dean Bowditch	Ipswich Town	
3 March 2008	8	Ian Westlake	Leeds United	
11 March 2008	11	Therry Racon	Charlton Athletic	

=== Transfers out ===
Date from	No.	Name	To	Fee	Ref.
1 July 2007		Chris Breach	Bognor Regis Town		
1 July 2007		Richard Martin	Manchester City	Free	
1 July 2007		Paul Hinshelwood	Torquay United		
2 August 2007	2	Charlie Oatway	Havant & Waterlooville	Free	
1 September 2007	22	Alexis Bertin	Gueugnon		
30 December 2007	17	Bas Savage	Millwall	Free	
30 January 2008	11	Dean Hammond	Colchester United	£250,000	
30 January 2008	8	Alex Revell	Southend United	£150,000	
31 January 2008	21	Nathan Elder	Brentford	£35,000	

=== Loans out ===
Date from	No.	Name	To	End of loan
1 July 2007	33	Sam Gargan	Worthing	1 September 2007
1 July 2007	32	Chris Winterton	Burgess Hill	1 November 2007
13 September 2007	20	Joe Gatting	Worthing	13 December 2007
1 October 2007	26	Wes Fogden	Dorchester Town	31 December 2007
14 November 2007	33	Sam Gargan	Bognor Regis	14 January 2008
1 January 2008	33	Sam Gargan	Welling United	25 April 2008
1 April 2008	26	Wes Fogden	Bognor Regis	31 May 2008
