= 2006–07 Brighton & Hove Albion F.C. season =

105th season in existence of Brighton & Hove Albion

Brighton & Hove Albion
2006–2007 season
- Chairman: Dick Knight
- Manager: Mark McGhee (until 8 September 2006); Dean Wilkins (from 8 September 2006)
- League One: 18th
- FA Cup: Third Round vs West Ham United
- League Cup: Second Round vs Southend United
- Football League Trophy: Area Semi-final vs Bristol City

The 2006–07 season was Brighton & Hove Albion's 105th year in existence and first season in League One after being relegated from the Championship. Mark McGhee began the season as manager, but after losing three consecutive matches he left the club on 8 September 2006. McGhee was succeeded as manager by youth coach and former Seagulls player Dean Wilkins, who steered the side to an 18th-placed finish.

== Squad ==
Note: Flags indicate national team as defined under FIFA eligibility rules; some limited exceptions apply. Players may hold more than one non-FIFA nationality.

No.	Pos.	Nation	Player
2	DF	AUS	Paul Reid
3	DF	ENG	Kerry Mayo
4	DF	ENG	Adam Hinshelwood
5	DF	ENG	Joel Lynch
6	MF	ENG	Adam El-Abd
7	MF	FRA	Alexandre Frutos
8	MF	AUS	Nick Ward (on loan from Queens Park Rangers)
9	FW	ENG	Gary Hart
10	MF	ENG	Charlie Oatway
11	MF	ENG	Dean Hammond
14	DF	ENG	Guy Butters
15	FW	ENG	Alex Revell
16	GK	NED	Michel Kuipers
17	GK	ENG	John Sullivan
18	GK	ENG	Richard Martin
19	FW	ENG	Jake Robinson

No.	Pos.	Nation	Player
20	FW	ENG	Joe Gatting
21	DF	PAK	Zesh Rehman (on loan from Queens Park Rangers)
22	MF	FRA	Alexis Bertin
23	MF	ENG	Doug Loft
24	MF	FRA	Georges Santos
25	DF	ENG	Chris Breach
26	DF	ENG	Tommy Elphick
27	MF	ENG	Sam Rents
28	MF	ENG	Dean Cox
29	DF	ENG	Paul Hinshelwood
30	MF	ENG	Tommy Fraser
31	DF	ENG	Scott Chamberlain
32	MF	ENG	Wes Fogden
34	FW	ENG	Bas Savage
35	FW	ENG	Nathan Elder
36	MF	IRL	Joe O'Cearuill
37	MF	ENG	Sam Gargan

=== Left club during season ===
Note: Flags indicate national team as defined under FIFA eligibility rules; some limited exceptions apply. Players may hold more than one non-FIFA nationality.

No.	Pos.	Nation	Player
1	GK	IRL	Wayne Henderson (to Preston North End)
1	GK	ENG	Scott Flinders (on loan from Crystal Palace)
12	DF	ENG	Richard Carpenter (contract terminated in February 2007)
21	FW	SUI	Maheta Molango (contract terminated in February 2007)
22	FW	TUR	Colin Kazim-Richards (to Sheffield United)
22	DF	ENG	Sam Williams (on loan from Aston Villa)

No.	Pos.	Nation	Player
22	FW	ENG	Dean Bowditch (on loan from Ipswich Town)
33	DF	ENG	Keith Lowe (on loan from Wolves)
33	DF	ENG	Andy Whing (on loan from Coventry City)
34	FW	ENG	Tony Stokes (on loan from West Ham United)
34	MF	ENG	Alistair John (on loan from Charlton Athletic)

== Results ==
=== League One ===
5 August 2006	Rotherham United	0–1	Brighton & Hove Albion	Rotherham
15:00		Report	Revell 43'; Cox (red card) 45'	Stadium: Millmoor; Attendance: 4,998; Referee: Colin Webster

8 August 2006	Brighton & Hove Albion	1–0	Gillingham	Brighton
19:45	Robinson 67'			Stadium: Withdean Stadium; Attendance: 6,643; Referee: Alan Wiley

12 August 2006	Brighton & Hove Albion	2–2	Brentford	Brighton
15:00	Hammond 10' (pen.); Hart 13'	Report	O'Connor 38'; Moore 90'	Stadium: Withdean Stadium; Attendance: 6,745; Referee: Grant Hegley

19 August 2006	Nottingham Forest	2–1	Brighton & Hove Albion	Nottingham
15:00	Holt 63' (pen.), 78'	Report	Robinson 39'	Stadium: City Ground; Attendance: 18,686; Referee: Mark Clattenburg

27 August 2006	Brighton & Hove Albion	1–4	Crewe Alexandra	Brighton
15:00	Cox 40'; Mayo (red card) 45'		Jones 44'; Lowe 45' (pen.); Maynard 56', 85'	Stadium: Withdean Stadium; Attendance: 5,848; Referee: Jarnail Singh

2 September 2006	Bristol City	1–0	Brighton & Hove Albion	Bristol
15:00	Brown 21'			Stadium: Ashton Gate; Attendance: 10,552; Referee: Chris Foy

9 September 2006	Millwall	0–1	Brighton & Hove Albion	Bermondsey, London
15:00			Carpenter (red card) 34'; Elliott 88' (own goal)	Stadium: The Den; Attendance: 9,372; Referee: Andy D'Urso

12 September 2006	Brighton & Hove Albion	2–2	A.F.C. Bournemouth	Brighton
19:45	Hammond 53'; Revell 60'		Foley-Sheridan 35'; Browning (red card) 45'; Howe 74'	Stadium: Withdean Stadium; Attendance: 5,958; Referee: Keith Hill

16 September 2006	Brighton & Hove Albion	4–1	Leyton Orient	Brighton
15:00	Reid 15'; El-Abd 31'; Cox 45'; Loft 90'		Mackie (red card) 15'; Lockwood 83' (pen.)	Stadium: Withdean Stadium; Attendance: 6,003; Referee: Darren Drysdale

23 September 2006	Carlisle United	3–1	Brighton & Hove Albion	Carlisle
15:00	Hawley 6'; Gray 31'; Hackney 82'		Revell 87'	Stadium: Brunton Park; Attendance: 7,704; Referee: Jonathan Moss

26 September 2006	Yeovil Town	2–0	Brighton & Hove Albion	Yeovil
19:45	Stewart 6'; Gray 82'			Stadium: Huish Park; Attendance: 5,243; Referee: Ray Olivier

30 September 2006	Brighton & Hove Albion	1–2	Chesterfield	Brighton
15:00	Williams 54'		Folan 20' (red card) 90'; Niven 74'	Stadium: Withdean Stadium; Attendance: 5,499; Referee: Steve Tanner

8 October 2006	Brighton & Hove Albion	0–3	Blackpool	Brighton
13:30	Frutos (red card) 72'		Southern 17'; Vernon 61', 87'	Stadium: Withdean Stadium; Attendance: 5,146; Referee: Paul Armstrong

14 October 2006	Scunthorpe United	1–2	Brighton & Hove Albion	Scunthorpe
15:00	Foster (red card); Sharp 43'		Cox 23'; Hart 52'	Stadium: Glanford Park; Attendance: 5,607; Referee: Darren Deadman

21 October 2006	Brighton & Hove Albion	1–1	Northampton Town	Brighton
15:00	Robinson 39'		Quinn 84'	Stadium: Withdean Stadium; Attendance: 5,862; Referee: Mick Thorpe

28 October 2006	Huddersfield Town	0–3	Brighton & Hove Albion	Huddersfield
15:00	Adams (red card) 86'		Robinson 23', 30', 50'	Stadium: Galpharm Stadium; Attendance: 10,616; Referee: Neil Swarbrick

4 November 2006	Bradford City	2–3	Brighton & Hove Albion	Bradford
15:00	Windass 56'; Schumacher 80'		Revell 13'; Hammond 48' (pen.); Bowditch 89'	Stadium: Valley Parade; Attendance: 7,610; Referee: Gary Sutton

18 November 2006	Brighton & Hove Albion	0–1	Tranmere Rovers	Brighton
15:00			Greenacre 20'	Stadium: Withdean Stadium; Attendance: 6,069; Referee: Kevin Wright

25 November 2006	Doncaster Rovers	1–0	Brighton & Hove Albion	Brighton
15:00	McCammon 25'			Stadium: The Earth Stadium; Attendance: 5,804; Referee: Rob Shoebridge

5 December 2006	Brighton & Hove Albion	3–2	Swansea City	Brighton
19:45	Cox 3'; Revell 66', 81'		Lawrence 59'; Pratley (red card) 84'; Fallon 90'	Stadium: Withdean Stadium; Attendance: 5,209; Referee: Kevin Friend

9 December 2006	Brighton & Hove Albion	2–1	Cheltenham Town	Brighton
19:45	Hammond 56', 89' (pen.)		Victory 76'	Stadium: Withdean Stadium; Attendance: 5,386; Referee: Jarnail Singh

16 December 2006	Oldham Athletic	1–1	Brighton & Hove Albion	Oldham
15:00	Warne 18'		Fraser (yellow card) 58'; Hammond 61'	Stadium: Boundary Park; Attendance: 9,321; Referee: Andy Hall

23 December 2006	Port Vale	2–1	Brighton & Hove Albion	Burslem
15:00	Constantine 13', 23' (pen.); Smith (yellow card) 32'		Fraser 84'; John (yellow card) 60'	Stadium: Vale Park; Attendance: 4,349; Referee: Phil Crossley

26 December 2006	Brighton & Hove Albion	1–3	Yeovil Town	Brighton
15:00	Gatting 72'; Cox (yellow card) 86'		Best 38' (yellow card) 83'; Morris 47' (yellow card) 54'; Cranie (yellow card) 51'; Davies 59'	Stadium: Withdean Stadium; Attendance: 6,554; Referee: Fred Graham

30 December 2006	Brighton & Hove Albion	1–2	Carlisle United	Brighton
15:00	Cox (yellow card) 29'; Gatting 37'		Aranalde 56'; Raven (yellow card) 72'; McDermott 82'	Stadium: Withdean Stadium; Attendance: 5,436; Referee: Patrick Miller

1 January 2007	A.F.C. Bournemouth	1–0	Brighton & Hove Albion	Bournemouth
15:00	Browning (yellow card) 79'; Pitman 90+3'		Revell (yellow card) 79'; Hammond (yellow card) 80'	Stadium: Vitality Stadium; Attendance: 6,686; Referee: Richard Beeby

13 January 2007	Brighton & Hove Albion	0–1	Millwall	Brighton
15:00	Cox (yellow card) 90+6'		Byfield 22' (yellow card) 62'; Shaw (yellow card) 27'; Dunne (yellow card) 47'; Elliott (yellow card) 75'	Stadium: Withdean Stadium; Attendance: 6,226; Referee: Michael Russell

20 January 2007	Chesterfield	0–1	Brighton & Hove Albion	Chesterfield
15:00	Downes (yellow card) 73'		Gatting 50'; El-Abd (yellow card) 89'	Stadium: Saltergate; Attendance: 3,984; Referee: Colin Webster

27 January 2007	Brighton & Hove Albion	0–0	Port Vale	Brighton
15:00				Stadium: Withdean Stadium; Attendance: 5,177; Referee: Mike Thorpe

3 February 2007	Brighton & Hove Albion	0–0	Rotherham United	Brighton
15:00	Hammond (yellow card) 5'; El-Abd (yellow card) 44'		Cochrane (yellow card) 1'	Stadium: Withdean Stadium; Attendance: 5,444; Referee: Darren Deadman

10 February 2007	Brentford	1–0	Brighton & Hove Albion	Brentford
15:00	Kuffour 31'; Frampton (yellow card) 43'; Richards (yellow card) 45+2'		Mayo (yellow card) 25' (yellow-red card) 45+1'; O'Cearuill (yellow card) 48'; Bertin (yellow card) 89'	Stadium: Griffin Park; Attendance: 7,023; Referee: Keith Hill

13 February 2007	Leyton Orient	1–4	Brighton & Hove Albion	Leyton
19:45	Dimitriou 87'		Hammond 39'; Savage 57'; Gatting 67'; Cox 89'	Stadium: Gaughan Group Stadium; Attendance: 4,670; Referee: Ray Olivier

17 February 2007	Brighton & Hove Albion	2–1	Nottingham Forest	Brighton
15:00	Ward (yellow card) 59' (goal) 73'; Hammond 72'; Cox (yellow card) 87'		Tyson (red card) 53'; Lester 55'; Holt (yellow card) 63'; Prutton (yellow card) 83'	Stadium: Withdean Stadium; Attendance: 7,749; Referee: Andy Woolmer

20 February 2007	Gillingham	0–1	Brighton & Hove Albion	Gillingham
19:45	Southall (yellow card) 82'		Savage 18' (yellow card) 44'; Hammond (yellow card) 31'; Gatting (yellow card) 71'	Stadium: Priestfield Stadium; Attendance: 6,609; Referee: Phil Joslin

24 February 2007	Brighton & Hove Albion	0–2	Bristol City	Brighton
15:00	O'Cearuill (yellow card) 80'; Fraser (red card) 82'		Jevons 43', 84' (pen.); Noble (yellow card) 77'	Stadium: Withdean Stadium; Attendance: 6,280; Referee: Mike Riley

3 March 2007	Crewe Alexandra	1–1	Brighton & Hove Albion	Crewe
15:00	Varney 18'		Savage 31'; Hammond (yellow card) 73'	Stadium: Mornflake Stadium; Attendance: 5,202; Referee: Keith Stroud

10 March 2007	Blackpool	0–0	Brighton & Hove Albion	Blackpool
15:00				Stadium: Bloomfield Road; Attendance: 8,164; Referee: Anthony Taylor

17 March 2007	Brighton & Hove Albion	1–1	Scunthorpe United	Brighton
16:00	Cox (yellow card) 62'; O'Cearuill (yellow card) 68'; Savage 72'		Mulligan (yellow card) 41'; Sharp (yellow card) 49'; Sparrow (yellow card) 62' (yellow-red card) 90+4'; Beckford 64'; MacKenzie (yellow card) 90+5'	Stadium: Withdean Stadium; Attendance: 6,276; Referee: Peter Walton

24 March 2007	Brighton & Hove Albion	0–0	Huddersfield Town	Brighton
16:00	Butters (yellow card) 42'; Elder (yellow card) 70'		Skarz (yellow card) 6'; Schofield (yellow card) 30'; Taylor-Fletcher (yellow card) 45+1'; Sinclair (yellow card) 57' (yellow-red card) 64'; Booth (yellow card) 62'	Stadium: Withdean Stadium; Attendance: 5,974; Referee: Mike Jones

31 March 2007	Northampton Town	0–2	Brighton & Hove Albion	Northampton
15:00	Cox (yellow card) 78'; Taylor (yellow card) 79'		Savage 60', 66'; Bertin (yellow card) 63'; Lynch (yellow card) 77'	Stadium: Sixfields Stadium; Attendance: 6,613; Referee: Darren Deadman

7 April 2007	Brighton & Hove Albion	0–2	Doncaster Rovers	Brighton
15:00	Loft (yellow card) 21'; Bertin (yellow card) 44'		Thornton (yellow card) 8'; Lee 28'; Cadamarteri 47'; Heffernan (yellow card) 74'	Stadium: Withdean Stadium; Attendance: 6,267; Referee: Ian Williamson

9 April 2007	Tranmere Rovers	2–1	Brighton & Hove Albion	Prenton
15:00	Zola (yellow card) 47'; Cansdell-Sherriff (yellow card) 54'; Curran 76'; Greenacre 90+4' (pen.)		Goodison 11' (o.g.); Rehman (yellow card) 12'	Stadium: Prenton Park; Attendance: 5,528; Referee: Anthony Bates

14 April 2007	Brighton & Hove Albion	0–1	Bradford City	Brighton
15:00	Cox (yellow card) 53'; Butters (yellow card) 60'		Paynter 35'; Parker (yellow card) 81'; Youga (yellow card) 88'	Stadium: Withdean Stadium; Attendance: 5,757; Referee: Phil Crossley

21 April 2007	Swansea City	2–1	Brighton & Hove Albion	Swansea
15:00	Duffy 21', 41'; Guéret (yellow card) 50'		Revell 14'; Mayo (yellow card) 71'	Stadium: Swansea.com Stadium; Attendance: 11,972; Referee: Ray Olivier

28 April 2007	Brighton & Hove Albion	1–2	Oldham Athletic	Brighton
15:00	Bertin (yellow card) 54'; Cox 85'; El-Abd (yellow card) 87'; Rents (yellow card) 90+1'		Porter 18'; Liddell 40'; Rocastle (yellow card) 87'	Stadium: Withdean Stadium; Attendance: 7,588; Referee: Michael Russell

5 May 2007	Cheltenham Town	1–1	Brighton & Hove Albion	Cheltenham
15:00	Melligan (yellow card) 21'; Odejayi (yellow card) 34'; Finnigan 87' (pen.)		Elder 23'; Rehman (yellow card) 34'; Hart (yellow card) 39'; Butters (yellow card) 81'; Kuipers (yellow card) 87'	Stadium: Completely-Suzuki Stadium; Attendance: 6,232; Referee: Paul Taylor

=== FA Cup ===
Brighton & Hove Albion were knocked out of the FA Cup in the third round with an away defeat to Premier League outfit West Ham United.

11 November 2006 First round	Brighton & Hove Albion	8–0	Northwich Victoria	Brighton
15:00	Cox 8', 90'; Robinson 18', 55', 78'; Revell 64'; Gatting 82'; Rents 89'		McCarthy (yellow card)	Stadium: Withdean Stadium; Attendance: 4,487; Referee: Darren Cann

2 December 2006 Second round	Brighton & Hove Albion	3–0	Stafford Rangers	Brighton
15:00	Hammond 18'; Hinshelwood (yellow card) 25'; Revell 66' (yellow card) 69'; Robinson 90'	Report	Murphy (yellow card) 71'	Stadium: Withdean Stadium; Attendance: 5,741; Referee: Danny McDermid

6 January 2008 Third round	West Ham United	3–0	Brighton & Hove Albion	Upton Park
15:00	Noble 49'; Cole 58'; Mullins 90+3'		Mayo (yellow card) 15'; El-Abd (yellow card) 26'	Stadium: Boleyn Ground; Attendance: 32,874; Referee: Mark Halsey

=== Football League Cup ===
Brighton & Hove Albion were knocked out of the Football League Cup in the second round by Championship side Southend United.

23 August 2007 First round	Brighton & Hove Albion	1–0	Boston United	Brighton
19:45	Reid 73'			Stadium: Withdean Stadium; Attendance: 2,533; Referee: Paul Taylor

19 September 2007 Second round	Southend United	3–2	Brighton & Hove Albion	Southend-on-Sea
19:45	Francis (yellow card) 21'; Sodje (yellow card) 45'; Paynter 87'; Hunt 88'; Eastwood 90+2'		Hart (yellow card) 45'; Cox 71'; El-Abd 90+4'	Stadium: Roots Hall; Attendance: 4,819; Referee: Phil Crossley

=== Football League Trophy ===
Brighton & Hove Albion were knocked out in the Southern area semi-final by League One second-place finishers Bristol City

17 October 2006 Southern First Round	Brighton & Hove Albion	2–0	Boston United	Brighton
19:00	Robinson 41'; Hammond 65'			Stadium: Withdean Stadium; Attendance: 1,740; Referee: Andrew Penn

1 November 2006 Southern Second Round	Brighton & Hove Albion	4–1	MK Dons	Brighton
19:15	Cox 14'; Revell 37', 82'; Hammond 87'		Page (yellow card) 52' (goal) 84'	Stadium: Withdean Stadium; Attendance: 2,774; Referee: Richard Beeby

28 November 2006 Southern Quarter Final	Millwall	1–1 (a.e.t.) (2–3 p)	Brighton & Hove Albion	Bermondsey
19:30	Robinson 41'; Whitbread (yellow card) 44'	Report	Butters (red card) 21'; Hammond (yellow card) 75'; Robinson 88'; Cox (yellow card) 90'	Stadium: The Den; Attendance: 3,659; Referee: Paul Armstrong
	Penalties
	Byfield (penalty missed); Zebroski (penalty scored); Senda (penalty scored); Lee (penalty missed); Whitbread (penalty missed)		Hammond (penalty scored); Cox (penalty missed); Robinson (penalty scored); Gatting (penalty missed); Mayo (penalty scored)

23 January 2007 Southern Semi Final	Bristol City	2–0	Brighton & Hove Albion	Bristol
19:30	Showunmi 41'; Andrews (yellow card) 45' (goal) 68'		El-Abd (yellow card) 22'; Hart (yellow card) 45'	Stadium: Ashton Gate; Attendance: 6,485; Referee: Anthony Bates
