= 2005–06 Brighton & Hove Albion F.C. season =

2005–06 season of Brighton & Hove Albion

Brighton & Hove Albion
2005–06 season
- Chairman: Dick Knight
- Manager: Mark McGhee
- Stadium: Withdean Stadium
- Football League Championship: 24th (relegated)
- FA Cup: Third round
- League Cup: First round
- Top goalscorer: Kazim-Richards (6)
- Average home league attendance: 6,793
Home colours

During the 2005–06 English football season, Brighton & Hove Albion F.C. competed in the Football League Championship.

== Season summary ==
After survival the previous season, Brighton endured a poor 2005–06 Championship campaign and were relegated two games before the end of the season by losing 2–0 to Sheffield Wednesday which also sent Crewe Alexandra and Millwall down with them.

== Final league table ==
Pos	Team	Pld	W	D	L	GF	GA	GD	Pts	Promotion, qualification or relegation
20	Derby County	46	10	20	16	53	67	−14	50	
21	Queens Park Rangers	46	12	14	20	50	65	−15	50	
22	Crewe Alexandra (R)	46	9	15	22	57	86	−29	42	Relegation to Football League One
23	Millwall (R)	46	8	16	22	35	62	−27	40	Relegation to Football League One
24	Brighton & Hove Albion (R)	46	7	17	22	39	71	−32	38	Relegation to Football League One

Updated to match(es) played on 2 December 2011. Source: RSSSF
Rules for classification: 1) points; 2) goal difference; 3) number of goals scored.
(R) Relegated

== Results ==
Brighton & Hove Albion's score comes first

=== Legend ===
Win	Draw	Loss

=== Football League Championship ===
Date	Opponent	Venue	Result	Attendance	Scorers
6 August 2005	Derby County	A	1–1	25,292	Hammond
9 August 2005	Reading	H	0–2	6,676	
13 August 2005	Crewe Alexandra	H	2–2	6,132	Knight, Hammond
20 August 2005	Hull City	A	0–2	18,648	
27 August 2005	Preston North End	A	0–0	12,461	
29 August 2005	Plymouth Argyle	H	2–0	6,238	Robinson, Carpenter
10 September 2005	Leeds United	A	3–3	21,212	Knight, Carole, Gregan (own goal)
13 September 2005	Sheffield United	H	0–1	6,553	
17 September 2005	Coventry City	H	2–2	6,529	Knight, Kazim-Richards
24 September 2005	Burnley	A	1–1	11,112	McShane
27 September 2005	Leicester City	A	0–0	20,296	
1 October 2005	Norwich City	H	1–3	6,624	Frutos
15 October 2005	Cardiff City	H	1–2	6,485	McShane
18 October 2005	Crystal Palace	A	1–0	22,400	McShane
24 October 2005	Sheffield Wednesday	A	1–1	21,787	Kazim-Richards
29 October 2005	Ipswich Town	H	1–1	6,867	Hammond
1 November 2005	Wolverhampton Wanderers	H	1–1	6,642	Frutos
5 November 2005	Stoke City	A	0–3	15,274	
20 November 2005	Crystal Palace	H	2–3	7,067	Knight (2, 1 pen)
22 November 2005	Cardiff City	A	1–1	9,595	Kazim-Richards
26 November 2005	Derby County	H	0–0	6,855	
3 December 2005	Watford	A	1–1	14,455	Butters
10 December 2005	Reading	A	1–5	18,546	Kazim-Richards
16 December 2005	Hull City	H	2–1	6,929	Carole, Oatway
26 December 2005	Queens Park Rangers	H	1–0	7,341	Butters
28 December 2005	Luton Town	A	0–3	9,429	
31 December 2005	Millwall	H	1–2	6,847	Hammond
2 January 2006	Southampton	A	1–2	24,630	Mayo
14 January 2006	Leeds United	H	2–1	7,415	Reid, Hart
21 January 2006	Sheffield United	A	1–3	27,514	Kazim-Richards
31 January 2006	Burnley	H	0–0	6,267	
4 February 2006	Coventry City	A	0–2	20,541	
11 February 2006	Leicester City	H	1–2	7,187	Frutos
14 February 2006	Norwich City	A	0–3	23,246	
18 February 2006	Watford	H	0–1	6,658	
25 February 2006	Crewe Alexandra	A	1–2	5,925	Kazim-Richards
4 March 2006	Plymouth Argyle	A	0–1	13,650	
11 March 2006	Preston North End	H	0–0	6,361	
18 March 2006	Queens Park Rangers	A	1–1	13,907	Bignot (own goal)
25 March 2006	Luton Town	H	1–1	7,139	Noel-Williams
1 April 2006	Millwall	A	2–0	13,209	Reid, McShane
8 April 2006	Southampton	H	0–2	7,999	
15 April 2006	Ipswich Town	A	2–1	23,964	Noel-Williams, Lynch
17 April 2006	Sheffield Wednesday	H	0–2	7,573	
22 April 2006	Wolverhampton Wanderers	A	0–1	22,555	
30 April 2006	Stoke City	H	1–5	5,859	Loft

=== FA Cup ===
Round	Date	Opponent	Venue	Result	Attendance	Goalscorers
R3	7 January 2006	Coventry City	H	0–1	6,734	

=== League Cup ===
Round	Date	Opponent	Venue	Result	Attendance	Goalscorers
R1	23 August 2005	Shrewsbury Town	A	2–3	2,141	McCammon, Robinson

== Squad ==
Note: Flags indicate national team as defined under FIFA eligibility rules; some limited exceptions apply. Players may hold more than one non-FIFA nationality.

No.	Pos.	Nation	Player
1	GK	NED	Michel Kuipers
2	DF	AUS	Paul Reid
3	DF	ENG	Kerry Mayo
4	DF	ENG	Adam Hinshelwood
5	DF	ENG	Jason Dodd
6	MF	ENG	Alexis Nicolas
7	FW	ENG	Gifton Noel-Williams (on loan from Burnley)
8	FW	ARG	Federico Turienzo
9	FW	ENG	Gary Hart
10	MF	ENG	Charlie Oatway
11	MF	ENG	Dean Hammond
12	MF	ENG	Richard Carpenter
13	GK	ENG	Richard Martin
14	DF	ENG	Guy Butters
15	FW	ENG	Mark McCammon
16	FW	ENG	Chris McPhee

No.	Pos.	Nation	Player
17	FW	FRA	Sébastien Carole
18	FW	SLE	Albert Jarrett
19	MF	FRA	Alexandre Frutos
20	DF	ENG	Adam El-Abd
21	FW	ENG	Jake Robinson
22	MF	ENG	Colin Kazim-Richards
23	MF	ENG	Doug Loft
24	DF	IRL	Paul McShane (on loan from Manchester United)
26	DF	ENG	Chris Breach
28	GK	IRL	Wayne Henderson
29	MF	ENG	Dean Cox
30	DF	ENG	Tommy Elphick
31	GK	ENG	John Sullivan
33	FW	ENG	Joe Gatting
34	DF	ENG	Joel Lynch
40	GK	FRA	Florent Chaigneau (on loan from Rennes)

=== Left club during season ===
Note: Flags indicate national team as defined under FIFA eligibility rules; some limited exceptions apply. Players may hold more than one non-FIFA nationality.

No.	Pos.	Nation	Player
23	GK	NIR	Alan Blayney (on loan from Southampton)
7	FW	ENG	Leon Knight (to Swansea City)

No.	Pos.	Nation	Player
27	DF	ENG	Gary Elphick (to St Albans City)
