= Joel Lynch =

Wales footballer

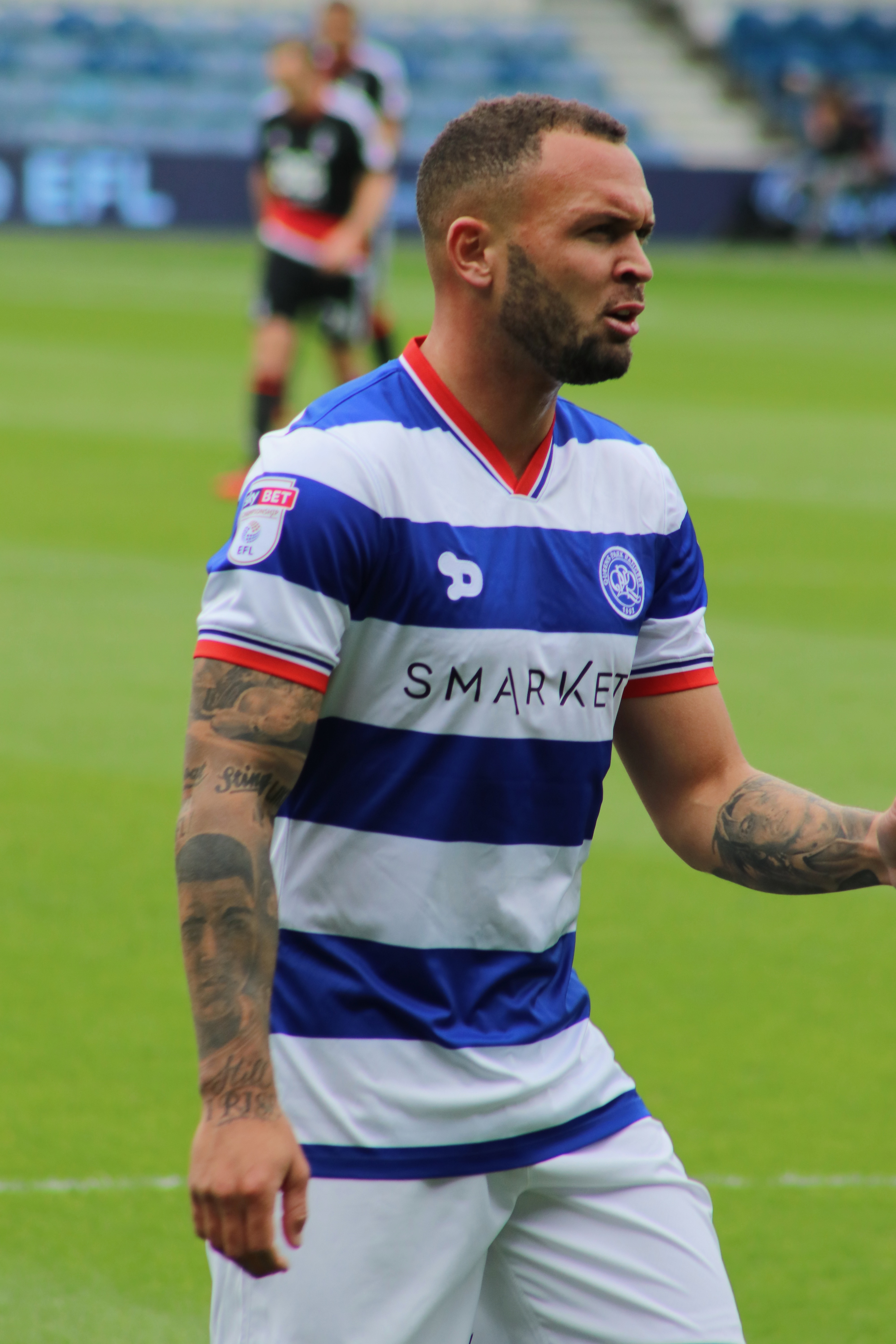
- Lynch playing for Queens Park Rangers in 2017

Personal information
- Full name: Joel John Lynch
- Date of birth: 3 October 1987 (age 39)
- Place of birth: Eastbourne, England
- Height: 6 ft 1 in (1.85 m)
- Position: Defender

Youth career
- 2003–2005: Brighton & Hove Albion

Senior career*
| Years | Team | Apps | (Gls) |
| 2005–2009 | Brighton & Hove Albion | 79 | (2) |
| 2008–2009 | → Nottingham Forest (loan) | 23 | (0) |
| 2009–2012 | Nottingham Forest | 57 | (3) |
| 2012–2016 | Huddersfield Town | 122 | (8) |
| 2016–2019 | Queens Park Rangers | 90 | (7) |
| 2019–2020 | Sunderland | 16 | (0) |
| 2021–2023 | Crawley Town | 31 | (2) |
| 2023–2025 | Precision | | |

International career
| 2012 | Wales | 1 | (0) |
- * Club domestic league appearances and goals as of 08:06, 2 May 2025 (UTC)

Joel John Lynch (born 3 October 1987) is a professional footballer who plays as a defender. He previously played for Brighton & Hove Albion, Nottingham Forest, Huddersfield Town and Queens Park Rangers. Born in England, he has represented the Wales national team.

== Club career ==
=== Brighton & Hove Albion ===
Lynch came through Brighton & Hove Albion's youth set up and was part of a history breaking youth team which saw them reach the quarter-finals of the FA Youth Cup. His reward, along with teammate Joe Gatting, was a place in the squad for the first team which saw him make his debut against Southampton on 3 January 2006.

In summer 2006, Lynch signed a professional three-year contract with Brighton, a deal which was later extended.

Lynch attracted the interest of several Premier League and Championship clubs during his career with Brighton, with Nottingham Forest and Portsmouth keeping a close scrutiny on the player.

After starting the 2008–09 season out of the Brighton first-team, Lynch handed in a written transfer request which was formally rejected by the club. Lynch then handed in a second written transfer request during September 2008 and Brighton reluctantly allowed him to join Nottingham Forest on loan, initially for a month. He made only one start and two substitute appearances for Brighton in the 2008–09 season.

Lynch made a total of 68 league starts for Brighton and scored a total of two goals.

=== Nottingham Forest ===
==== Loan spell 2008–09 ====
Lynch joined Nottingham Forest on loan in September 2008. After five appearances, the following month this loan spell was extended until 28 December, then the loan deal was further extended to keep Lynch at the City Ground for the remainder of the season. Forest paid the player's contractual wages and paid Brighton a fee of £25,000 where he made 23 appearances for Forest. He found himself playing at left full-back, covering for the long term absence through injury of Julian Bennett.

==== 2009–10 season ====
On 21 July 2009, Lynch was signed permanently by Forest on a three-year contract for a fee of £200,000. As part of this transfer deal, Forest loaned midfielder Matt Thornhill to Brighton for an initial six months. Lynch's first team opportunities at Forest were limited, especially in his favoured position of centre-back as he has been down the pecking order to Wes Morgan, Kelvin Wilson and Luke Chambers. He has also suffered from injuries. Most of his appearances have come from filling in at left full-back. In the 2009–10 season, Lynch made only 11 starts in all competitions (3 at centre-back; 8 at left-back).

==== 2010–11 season ====
Lynch made his first appearance of the 2010–11 season playing 101 minutes in Forest's Football League Cup first round exit to League Two side Bradford City on 10 August 2010 when they lost 2–1 after extra time. His first appearance in the league didn't come until 20 November 2010 when he was used as an 85th-minute substitute in the sides 2–0 away win over Cardiff City. He made his first league start in a 1–0 away win over Ipswich Town on 3 January 2011 being substituted in the 81st minute and would go on to start Forest's next five games. Lynch would only play 15 times during the 2010–11 season making only 11 starts in all competitions and playing mostly at left back over his more natural centre back position.

==== 2011–12 season ====
During the 2011–12 season, he was given a chance to play in his preferred position in the centre of defence, alongside Wes Morgan, then Luke Chambers when Morgan joined Leicester City. He put in a series of very impressive displays and began to regularly hold down a starting place and showing signs of fulfilling his potential. On 19 November, Lynch scored his first goal for Nottingham Forest in the 3–2 win against Ipswich Town. His second came in a 2–1 loss to Middlesbrough, and his third was a header against former club Brighton.

=== Huddersfield Town ===
On 11 July 2012, Lynch signed a 3-year deal with Huddersfield Town after turning down a new deal at former club Forest becoming manager Simon Grayson's fifth signing of 2012–13 season. Lynch was given the number 33 shirt for the 2012–13 season by manager Simon Grayson on 14 July 2012. He made his league début in the 1–0 defeat by Cardiff City at the Cardiff City Stadium on 17 August. On 25 August he scored his first goal in a league match against Burnley when he gave Huddersfield a 1–0 lead, where Huddersfield won 2–0 in the end. Lynch received his first red card of his Huddersfield career at Hillsborough Stadium in Huddersfield's 3–1 win over Sheffield Wednesday.

Lynch's first goal of the 2013–14 season came in the 3–2 League Cup win against Charlton Athletic on 27 August 2013. Less than a month later Lynch would again score against Charlton, this time in League action on 17 September, before picking up a red card against Reading on 14 December. 15 days later Lynch scored again, this time in a 5–1 rout against Yeovil Town. On 12 April 2014 Lynch received his second red card of the season, this time on 12 April 2014 against Derby County in what proved to be Lynch's penultimate appearance of the season.

His first goal of the 2014–15 season came against former club Nottingham Forest, just 43 seconds into their Championship clash on 1 November 2014.

=== Queens Park Rangers ===
On 29 June 2016, Lynch joined fellow Football League Championship side Queens Park Rangers on a three-year deal for an undisclosed fee believed to be around £1.2 million, potentially rising to £1.5 million. He scored his first goal for QPR in a 2–1 loss to Wolverhampton Wanderers on 1 December 2016.

=== Sunderland ===
Following release from QPR, Lynch joined League One side Sunderland. On 17 June 2020, the club confirmed Lynch would be leaving.

=== Crawley Town ===
On 7 September 2021, Lynch signed for EFL League Two club Crawley Town on a contract until 3 January 2022. He scored his first goal for the club in a 2-2 draw with Harrogate Town on 21 September 2021.

On 13 August 2023, it was announced that Lynch had left Crawley after he agreed to terminate his contract with the club.

=== Precision Football ===
Following his departure, Lynch joined UAE Third Division League club Precision Football, founded by former Brighton & Hove Albion academy teammate Sonny Cobbs. During the 2023–24 season, Lynch scored five goals as the club were promoted. He signed a new contract with the club in August 2024.

== International career ==
Born and raised in England, Lynch qualified for Wales through his father who was born in Barry. On 17 May 2012, Lynch was called up to the Wales squad for a friendly match against Mexico. He was a substitute, but did not feature in the match. On 12 August 2012 Lynch received his second international call up to the Wales squad for the friendly with Bosnia and Herzegovina. He made his debut as a 78th-minute substitute in that game on 15 August 2012.

== Career statistics ==
As of end of 2021–22 season

Appearances and goals by club, season and competition
| Club | Season | League | | | FA Cup | | League Cup | | Other | | Total | |
| Club | Season | Division | Apps | Goals | Apps | Goals | Apps | Goals | Apps | Goals | Apps | Goals |
|---|---|---|---|---|---|---|---|---|---|---|---|---|
| Brighton & Hove Albion | 2005–06 | Championship | 16 | 1 | 0 | 0 | 0 | 0 | 0 | 0 | 16 | 1 |
| Brighton & Hove Albion | 2006–07 | League One | 39 | 0 | 3 | 0 | 2 | 0 | 4 (Note: Appearance(s) in Football League Trophy) | 0 | 48 | 0 |
| Brighton & Hove Albion | 2007–08 | League One | 22 | 1 | 3 | 0 | 1 | 0 | 2 | 0 | 28 | 1 |
| Brighton & Hove Albion | 2008–09 | League One | 2 | 0 | 0 | 0 | 0 | 0 | 1 | 0 | 3 | 0 |
| Brighton & Hove Albion | Total | | 79 | 2 | 6 | 0 | 3 | 0 | 0 | 0 | 88 | 2 |
| Nottingham Forest (loan) | 2008–09 | Championship | 23 | 0 | 1 | 0 | 0 | 0 | 0 | 0 | 24 | 0 |
| Nottingham Forest | 2009–10 | Championship | 10 | 0 | 0 | 0 | 2 | 0 | 0 | 0 | 12 | 0 |
| Nottingham Forest | 2010–11 | Championship | 12 | 0 | 2 | 0 | 1 | 0 | 0 | 0 | 15 | 0 |
| Nottingham Forest | 2011–12 | Championship | 35 | 3 | 2 | 0 | 2 | 0 | 0 | 0 | 39 | 3 |
| Nottingham Forest | Total | | 57 | 3 | 4 | 0 | 5 | 0 | 0 | 0 | 66 | 3 |
| Huddersfield Town | 2012–13 | Championship | 22 | 1 | 0 | 0 | 0 | 0 | 0 | 0 | 22 | 1 |
| Huddersfield Town | 2013–14 | Championship | 29 | 2 | 0 | 0 | 2 | 1 | 0 | 0 | 31 | 3 |
| Huddersfield Town | 2014–15 | Championship | 34 | 3 | 0 | 0 | 1 | 0 | 0 | 0 | 35 | 3 |
| Huddersfield Town | 2015–16 | Championship | 37 | 2 | 2 | 0 | 1 | 0 | 0 | 0 | 40 | 2 |
| Huddersfield Town | Total | | 122 | 8 | 2 | 0 | 4 | 1 | 0 | 0 | 128 | 9 |
| Queens Park Rangers | 2016–17 | Championship | 30 | 3 | 1 | 0 | 2 | 0 | 0 | 0 | 33 | 3 |
| Queens Park Rangers | 2017–18 | Championship | 25 | 1 | 0 | 0 | 0 | 0 | 0 | 0 | 25 | 1 |
| Queens Park Rangers | 2018–19 | Championship | 35 | 3 | 2 | 0 | 0 | 0 | 0 | 0 | 37 | 3 |
| Queens Park Rangers | Total | | 90 | 7 | 3 | 0 | 2 | 0 | 0 | 0 | 95 | 7 |
| Sunderland | 2019–20 | League One | 16 | 0 | 1 | 0 | 2 | 0 | 2 (Note: Appearance(s) in EFL Trophy) | 0 | 21 | 0 |
| Crawley Town | 2021–22 | League Two | 24 | 2 | 0 | 0 | 0 | 0 | 0 | 0 | 24 | 2 |
| Crawley Town | 2022–23 | League Two | 0 | 0 | 0 | 0 | 0 | 0 | 0 | 0 | 0 | 0 |
| Crawley Town | Total | | 24 | 2 | 0 | 0 | 0 | 0 | 0 | 0 | 24 | 2 |
| Career total | | | 411 | 22 | 17 | 0 | 16 | 1 | 9 | 0 | 446 | 23 |
