= Dean Hammond =

English footballer

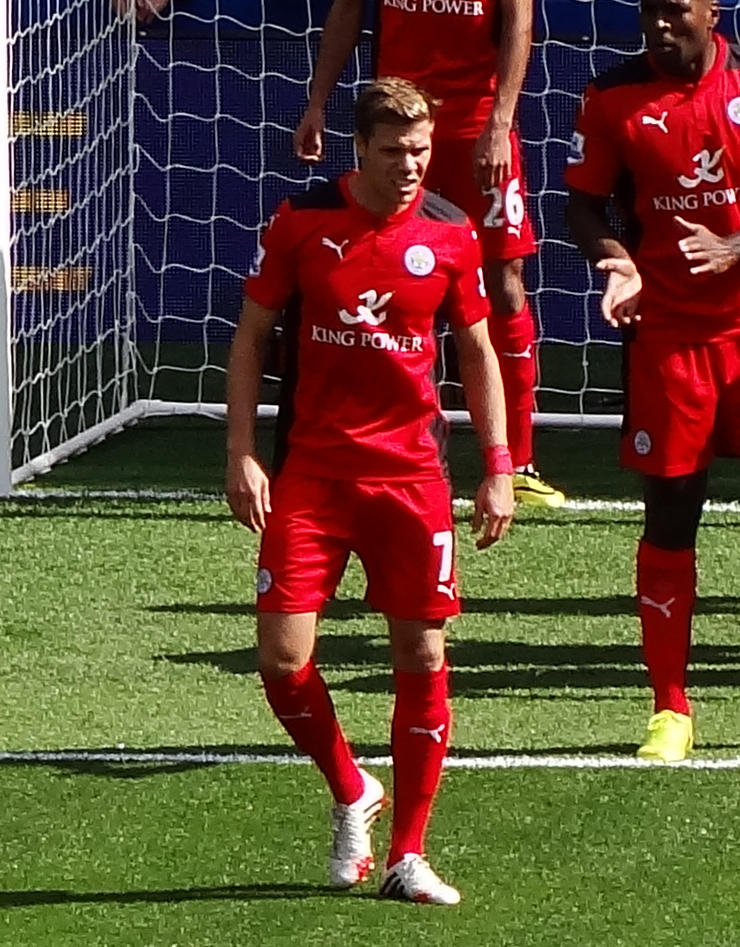
- Hammond playing for Leicester City in 2014

Personal information
- Full name: Dean John Hammond
- Date of birth: 7 March 1983 (age 43)
- Place of birth: Hastings, England
- Height: 6 ft 0 in (1.83 m)
- Position: Midfielder

Team information
- Current team: Sutton United (assistant manager)

Youth career
- 1998–2000: Brighton & Hove Albion

Senior career*
Years	Team	Apps	(Gls)
2000–2008	Brighton & Hove Albion	136	(21)
2003	→ Aldershot Town (loan)	7	(0)
2003	→ Leyton Orient (loan)	8	(0)
2008–2009	Colchester United	56	(5)
2009–2013	Southampton	124	(10)
2012–2013	→ Brighton & Hove Albion (loan)	37	(2)
2013–2016	Leicester City	41	(1)
2015–2016	→ Sheffield United (loan)	30	(2)
2016	Sheffield United	0	(0)
2020	Worthing	0	(0)
Total		439	(41)

Managerial career
- 2025: Worthing (caretaker)
- * Club domestic league appearances and goals

Dean John Hammond (born 7 March 1983) is an English former professional footballer who played as a midfielder. He previously played in the Football League for Brighton & Hove Albion, Leyton Orient, Colchester United, Leicester City and Southampton. He is currently assistant manager of Sutton United.

== Football career ==
=== Brighton & Hove Albion ===
Born in Hastings, England, Hammond began his career at Brighton & Hove Albion when he was eleven years and then started in 1998 on YTS forms and started to progress at the club's development squad. Hammond made his Brighton & Hove Albion debut on 6 December 2000, in the first round of the Southern Section of Football League Trophy, in a 2–0 win over Cardiff City. This turned out to be his only appearance in the 2000–01 season.

Following this, Hammond returned to the club's reserve for the next two seasons before signing his first professional contract on 11 May 2002. Following this, Hammond was promoted to the first team at the start of the 2002–03 season. Hammond made his league debut for the club on 14 September 2002, coming on as a late substitute, in a 4–2 loss against Gillingham. Ten days later, on 24 September 2002, he scored his first Brighton & Hove Albion goal, in a 3–1 loss against Ipswich Town in the second round of League Cup. After the match, Manager Martin Hinshelwood praised Hammond's performance, including his first goal for the side. Under the new management of Steve Coppell, Hammond struggled to regain his first team place and never played again for the rest of the 2002–03 season.

In the 2003–04 season, Hammond was loaned out to lower league teams, starting with Aldershot Town during September. After making seven appearances at Aldershot Town, he returned to his parent club despite intending to extend his loan spell at the club. Following this, Hammond was loaned out to Leyton Orient shortly after. After extending his loan spell for another month with Leyton Orient, and went on to make nine appearances for the side. At the end of the 2003–04 season, Hammond was offered a new contract.

He was given a six-month ultimatum at the start of the 2004–05 season by then manager Mark McGhee. However, Hammond suffered an injury in the pre–season friendly that saw him sidelined at the start of the 2004–05 season. After returning to the first team from injury, Hammond was given a handful of first team appearances and making a huge impression, resulting him signing a contract until the end of the next season. Despite being on the substitute bench between October and March, he became a first team regular as a midfielder for the rest of the season and then scored his first league goal for the club on 16 March 2005, in a 4–2 loss against Wigan Athletic. Hammond scored again on 16 April 2005, in a 1–1 draw against Burnley, followed up by scoring twice, in a 2–2 draw against West Ham United on 23 April 2005. At the end of the 2004–05 season, Hammond finished the season making 30 appearances and scoring 4 times in all competitions.

At the beginning of the 2005–06 season, Hammond was handed the vacant number 11 shirt at the club, and became a first-team regular, either playing on the left hand side of midfield or in his preferred natural position of central midfield. He then started the 2005–06 season well when he scored the opening game of the season, in a 1–1 draw against Derby County and then scored again a week later, in a 2–2 draw against Crewe. For his good form at the club led him to sign a contract extension, keeping him until 2008. By the end of 2005, he went on to score two more goals against Ipswich Town and Millwall. However, Hammond received two red cards this season, with both of them came as a second bookable offence. Despite suffering setbacks from injury and suspension, Hammond went on to make 41 appearances scoring four times in all competitions.

In the 2006–07 season, Hammond was handed the captain's armband at the club after injuries to both Richard Carpenter and Charlie Oatway. He started the 2006–07 season well when he scored his first goal of the season, in a 2–2 draw against Brentford on 12 August 2006. His second goal then came on 12 September 2006, in a 2–2 draw against AFC Bournemouth. By the end of 2006, Hammond went on to score four more goals against Bradford City, Cheltenham Town (twice) and Oldham Athletic. After being sidelined with injury and suspension, Hammond became the new official club captain after Carpenter was released by Brighton at the end of January 2007. Weeks after being appointed as a new captain, Hammond scored two goals in two matches between 13 February 2007 and 17 February 2007 against Leyton Orient and Nottingham Forest. However, he suffered a hamstring injury that ruled him out for the rest of the season. Hammond also scored three times in cup competitions, with two came from Football League Trophy against Boston United and MK Dons, while the other one came from FA Cup against Stafford Rangers. Hammond finished the 2006–07 season making 39 appearances and scoring 11 times, making him the top–scorer both in the league and in all competitions. For his performance, Hammond was named the club's player of the year this season.

Ahead of the 2007–08 season, Hammond returned from injury in the pre–season. At the start of the 2007–08 season, he started the season well, scoring on his 100th league appearance start on 18 August 2007, in a 2–1 win over Northampton Town. Two weeks later, on 1 September 2007, Hammond scored again, in a 3–2 win over Southend United, followed up by scoring in a 3–0 win over Millwall in the next game. Two weeks later, on 22 September 2007, Hammond scored his fourth goal of the season, in a 2–1 loss against Yeovil Town. On 20 November 2007 he scored again in the FA Cup round, in a 2–1 win over Cheltenham Town. On 15 December 2007, Hammond scored his fifth league goal of the season, in a 3–0 win over Swindon Town. However, as the 2007–08 season progressed, with Hammond having one-year remaining on his contract at the Withdean, manager Dean Wilkins was keen to offer Hammond a new deal, with the club and representatives for the player beginning talks in October 2007. During January 2008, it was revealed that Hammond would only sign a new deal for the club if they showed the ambition of returning to the Championship. In the final months to his departure, Hammond was sent–off on his last appearance for a straight red card, just ten minutes into the game, in a 1–1 draw against Oldham Athletic. When the £300,000 capture of striker Glenn Murray from Rochdale failed to change Hammond's mind, the club placed him on the transfer list with little more than a week of the transfer window remaining.

=== Colchester United ===
On 30 January 2008, Brighton accepted an offer of £250,000 plus add-ons for the player. Hammond completed the deal the following day, moving to Colchester United.

However, Hammond suffered a setback since moving to Colchester United, as he suffered a calf injury, delaying his Colchester United. On 23 February 2008 he finally made his Colchester United debut, coming on as second-half substitute, in a 2–1 loss against Bristol City. Since making his Colchester United debut, Hammond established himself in the first team there at the club, but subsequently unable to help the club survive relegation and went on to make 13 appearances.

Ahead of the 2008–09 season, Hammond dismissed suggestions that he would leave Colchester United following their relegation and stated that he was given an opportunity to play. Nevertheless, Hammond continued to be a first team regular at Colchester United and then scored his first Colchester United goal on 25 October 2008, in a 5–0 win over Carlisle United. Following Chris Coyne's absent from the first team, Hammond was appointed captain in December for the rest of the season. Weeks after being given the captain role, Hammond scored again to give Colchester United their first ever win against Leeds United at Elland Road. On 17 January 2009 he scored his third Colchester United goal, in a 3–1 win over Cheltenham Town. After missing out for one game, due to injury, Hammond scored on his return from injury, in a 2–2 draw against Huddersfield Town on 3 March 2009. Following the match, Hammond's return was praised by Manager Paul Lambert, describing him as "terrific". For the rest of the season, Hammond continued to be a first team regular, resulting him being named the club's Player of the Year and Gazette Player of the Year award. At the end of the season, Hammond finished his full season at Colchester United making 43 appearances and scoring 5 times in all competitions.

In the 2009–10 season, Hammond found himself in the transfer speculation when Colchester United accepted a bid from Southampton, having previously turned down two bids from them. Amid to the transfer move to Southampton, Hammond made three appearances in all competitions, including a 7–1 win over Norwich City in the opening game of the season. Hammond made 63 appearances during his time with The U's, scoring 5 times in all competitions before his move to St. Mary's.

=== Southampton ===
On 19 August 2009, Hammond signed a three-year contract with Southampton for an undisclosed fee. As a result of moving to Southampton, his former club, Brighton, received a 20% of any profit as part of the clause following his move to Colchester United a year before.

Hammond made his Southampton debut on 22 August 2009, where he made his first start and played the whole game, in a 1–1 draw against Brentford. Since making his Southampton debut, Hammond became a first team regular. On 17 October 2009 Hammond scored his first goal against Oldham Athletic, and made the scoresheet again a week later, against Milton Keynes Dons. In November 2009, it was announced that Hammond was appointed as the new Southampton captain, succeeding goalkeeper Kelvin Davis. A week later, he scored again in the second round of the FA Cup, in a 2–1 win over Northampton Town and then scored a week later, in the league, in a 3–1 win over Walsall. However, during a 1–1 draw against Millwall on 16 January 2010, Hammond suffered an Achilles injury in the first half, resulted him being substituted and after the match, it was announced that he would be out for several weeks. After returning to the first team around mid–February, Hammond scored again, as well as, setting up one of the goals, in a 5–0 win over Huddersfield Town on 2 March 2010. He played for Southampton in the 2010 Football League Trophy final win against Carlisle United. On 1 April 2010, Hammond scored in a 2–2 draw against his former club, Brighton & Hove Albion, where he celebrated in front of the Brighton supporters by "running along the touchline cupping his hand to his ear, angering them". Although Southampton finished seventh place and having failed to reach the play–offs, having started the season with 15 points deduction, due to the club's financial problems, Hammond finished his first season at the club making 49 appearances and scoring 6 times in all competitions.

In the 2010–11 season, Hammond continued to be the club's captain and after a slow start in the first two league' matches of the season, Hammond set up one of the goals, in a 4–0 win over Bristol Rovers on 28 August 2010. On 13 November 2010 Hammond scored his first goal of the season, in a 3–2 loss against Carlisle United. Two months later, on 5 February 2011, Hammond scored again, in a 4–4 thrilling draw against Peterborough United. Then on 5 March 2011, he scored the second goal with a drive from the edge of the area against former club Colchester United to complete a 2–0 away win, and one week later on 12 March 2011, he, once again, scored an important second goal against AFC Bournemouth in a 3–1 away win. Despite suffering setbacks on three occasions from injuries during the season, Hammond eventually helped the club reach promotion to the Championship after two seasons at League One following a 3–1 win over Walsall on 7 May 2011. At the end of the 2010–11 season, Hammond finished the season making 47 appearances and scoring 4 times in all competitions.

Hammond started the season when he scored the first Southampton goal of the 2011–12 season, a 25-yard effort in a 3–1 victory over Leeds United, in their first game back in the Championship for two years. The season also saw Hammond found himself in a competition over the central midfielder position, which he described it as "take it to a new height". On 22 September 2011, Hammond then signed a contract extension with the club, keeping him until 2014. However, in a 1–1 draw against Reading on 22 October 2011, Hammond was sent–off in the second half and served one match, which came in the League Cup game. However, as the 2011–12 season progressed, he continued to be a first team regular despite being on the substitute bench on several time, which "he has adapted well to the style Saints have adopted." On 29 April 2012, Hammond gained promotion with Southampton to the Premier League. At the end of the 2011–12 season, Hammond went on make 48 appearances scoring once in all competitions.

However, in the 2012–13 season, Hammond struggled to regain his first team place in the Premier League and even lost his captaincy to Adam Lallana. Despite this, Hammond made his only appearance of the 2012–13 season, captained in the second round of the League Cup, in a 4–1 win over Stevenage.

=== Brighton & Hove Albion (loan) ===
On 31 August 2012, Hammond re-joined his former club Brighton & Hove Albion on loan for the remainder of the 2012–13 season. Upon re–joining the club, Hammond stated his aim is to win over his fans, having previously upset them when he scored against his former club, whilst at Southampton.

Hammond re–debuted for the club on 14 September 2012, where he made his first start and played the whole game, in a 3–0 win over Sheffield Wednesday. From that moment since re–debuting for the side, Hammond began to established himself in the first team at midfield position under Gus Poyet management, alongside Liam Bridcutt. On 28 November 2012 he scored his first goal for the club since 2007, in a 2–0 win over Bristol City. His second goal then came on 1 January 2013, in a 2–0 win over Ipswich Town. Despite being on the substitute bench on numerous occasion, Hammond went on to make 39 appearances scoring two times in all competitions in the 2012–13 season. Following this, the club allowed him to return to his parent club after it came to an end.

=== Leicester City ===
On 30 August 2013, Hammond joined Leicester City for an undisclosed fee, signing a two-year deal. Upon joining the club, Hammond said Leicester City move would benefited him to play in the Premier League one day.

Hammond made his Leicester City debut, coming on as a late second-half substitute, in a 2–0 win over Wigan Athletic on 14 September 2013. On 23 November 2013 he made his first start for the club, in a 2–0 win over Ipswich Town. Hammond scored his first goal for Leicester with a late, headed equaliser against Wigan Athletic on 1 April 2014, helping the Foxes extend their lead at the top of the Sky Bet Championship to seven points. However, since his move to Leicester City, Hammond appeared on the substitute bench, due to strong competitions from central–midfielders duo Danny Drinkwater and Matty James. Hammond played 29 times as Leicester won the Championship en route to promotion to the Premier League.

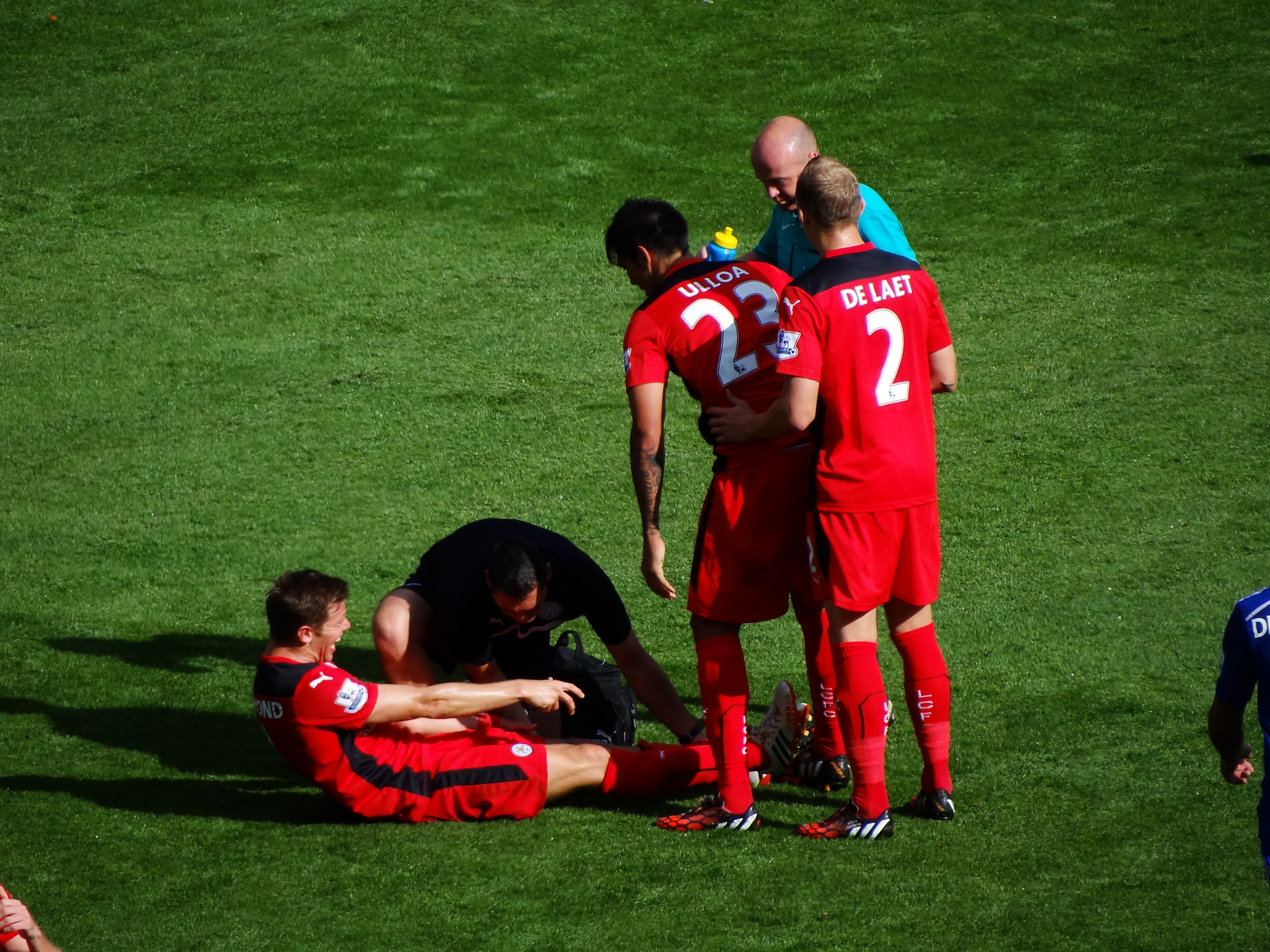
Hammond picked up an injury during the match against Chelsea; subsequently, he recovered, but suffered an injury and struggled in the first team at Leicester City in the 2014–15 season.

In the 2014–15 season, Hammond made his Premier League debut as a substitute for the injured Danny Drinkwater in the opening day 2–2 draw with Everton. Since making his Premier League, Hammond cemented his place with impressive performances against Chelsea, Arsenal and Stoke City. However, Hammond began to suffer a setback when he injured his calf and was out for a month. After making two more appearances in January, Hammond, again, suffered a calf injury that kept him out for another month. Although he returned in May, Hammond went on to make 12 appearances in the 2014–15 season. Subsequently, Hammond was offered a new contract by the club.

On 2 July 2015, Hammond signed a one-year contract extension until the summer of 2016. However, Hammond's first team opportunities became further limited under Claudio Ranieri following the arrival of new midfielders Gökhan Inler and N'Golo Kanté. As a result, Hammond was told by the club management to be loaned out in order to get a regular first team football. At the end of the 2015–16 season, which saw Leicester City win the English top-flight for the first time, Hammond was released by the club.

==== Sheffield United (loan) ====
On 20 October 2015, Hammond joined Sheffield United on loan until the end of January, rejoining his former manager from Southampton, Nigel Adkins.

Hammond made his debut the same day in a 3–0 victory over Fleetwood Town. On 24 November 2015 he scored his first Sheffield United goal, in a 4–2 loss against Shrewsbury Town. From that moment on, Hammond became a first team regular for the rest of the season and extended his loan spell until the end of the season. Hammond then scored his second goal for the club on 30 March 2016, in a 3–1 loss against Southend United. Hammond went on to make 34 appearances scoring twice for the side. During his time there, Hammond was considered by Manager Adkins as an 'unsung hero', due to his commitment at Sheffield United.

On 20 May 2016, Hammond activated his option of a permanent contract with the club which had been inserted as part of his loan move. However, new manager Chris Wilder was seemingly less keen on the services of Hammond and instantly placed him on the transfer list. On 2 July 2016, Hammond left the club by mutual consent.

After leaving Sheffield United, Hammond went on trial at Coventry City in January 2017. However, the club decided against offering a new contract to Hammond following a trial.

=== Return to Leicester and retirement ===
Hammond returned to former club Leicester City in the spring of 2017, featuring as an over age player in under-21 matches, whilst assisting with coaching.

Hammond featured for Leicester City in a pre season friendly match against Leamington in July 2017.

In August 2017, it was revealed that Hammond had moved back to Sussex, and has retired as a player but is keen to remain involved in football in some capacity.

As of March 2018, he was still involved with Leicester City, as 'Loans Manager' within the academy setup.

=== Worthing ===
On 22 March 2020, it was announced that Hammond would return to football to play for Isthmian League Premier Division club Worthing in the 7th tier of English football. However, the COVID-19 pandemic halted football across the nation before he could make an appearance.

== Coaching career ==
In March 2024, Hammond returned to Worthing in the role of first-team coach. In October 2025, he was appointed caretaker manager following the departure of head coach Chris Agutter.

On 8 October 2025, he was announced to have joined National League club Sutton United as assistant manager, following Agutter from Worthing.

== Personal life ==
Growing up, Hammond revealed that his ambition was to become a professional footballer, stating that he wanted to play as best he could, and at the highest level.

During his early Brighton & Hove Albion career, Hammond lived in a four-bedroom house in Hastings. Hammond began dating his then-19-year-old girlfriend, Rachel, who studied property surveying at Oxford Brookes University. They were married and together, the couple have three children, a daughter (born in 2009), a son (born in 2012) and another son (born 2016). However, their first son was just three weeks old when he was diagnosed with meningitis.

== Career statistics ==
Appearances and goals by club, season and competition
Club	Season	League			FA Cup		League Cup		Other		Total	
Club	Season	Division	Apps	Goals	Apps	Goals	Apps	Goals	Apps	Goals	Apps	Goals
Brighton & Hove Albion	2000–01	Division Three	0	0	0	0	0	0	1 (Note: Appearance(s) in Football League Trophy)	0	1	0
Brighton & Hove Albion	2001–02	Division Two	0	0	0	0	0	0	0	0	0	0
Brighton & Hove Albion	2002–03	Division One	4	0	0	0	1	1	—		5	1
Brighton & Hove Albion	2003–04	Division Two	0	0	—		0	0	0	0	0	0
Brighton & Hove Albion	2004–05	Championship	30	4	0	0	0	0	—		30	4
Brighton & Hove Albion	2005–06	Championship	41	4	1	0	1	0	—		43	4
Brighton & Hove Albion	2006–07	League One	37	8	3	1	2	0	4	2	46	11
Brighton & Hove Albion	2007–08	League One	24	5	3	1	1	0	2	0	30	6
Brighton & Hove Albion	Total		136	21	7	2	5	1	7	2	155	26
Aldershot Town (loan)	2003–04	Football Conference	7	0	—		—		—		7	0
Leyton Orient (loan)	2003–04	Division Three	8	0	1	0	—		—		9	0
Colchester United	2007–08	Championship	13	0	—		—		—		13	0
Colchester United	2008–09	League One	41	5	0	0	2	0	4	0	47	5
Colchester United	2009–10	League One	2	0	—		1	0	—		3	0
Colchester United	Total		56	5	0	0	3	0	4	0	63	5
Southampton	2009–10	League One	40	5	4	1	—		5	0	49	6
Southampton	2010–11	League One	41	4	3	0	2	0	1	0	47	4
Southampton	2011–12	Championship	43	1	3	0	2	0	—		48	1
Southampton	2012–13	Premier League	0	0	—		1	0	—		1	0
Southampton	Total		124	10	10	1	5	0	6	0	145	11
Brighton & Hove Albion (loan)	2012–13	Championship	37	2	2	0	—		2 (Note: Appearances in Championship play-offs)	0	41	2
Leicester City	2013–14	Championship	29	1	1	0	2	0	—		32	1
Leicester City	2014–15	Premier League	12	0	0	0	0	0	—		12	0
Leicester City	2015–16	Premier League	0	0	—		1	0	—		1	0
Leicester City	Total		41	1	1	0	3	0	—		45	1
Sheffield United (loan)	2015–16	League One	30	2	3	0	—		1	0	34	2
Career total			439	41	24	3	16	1	20	2	499	47

== Honours ==
Southampton

- Football League Championship second-place promotion: 2011–12
- Football League One second-place promotion: 2010–11
- Football League Trophy: 2009–10

Leicester City

- Football League Championship: 2013–14

Individual

- Brighton & Hove Albion Player of the Year: 2006–07
- Colchester United Player of the Year: 2008–09
