= Doug Loft =

English footballer (1986–2026)

- Loft playing for Port Vale in April 2013

Personal information
- Full name: Douglas James Loft
- Date of birth: 25 December 1986
- Place of birth: Maidstone, England
- Date of death: c. 11 October 2026 (aged 39)
- Height: 6 ft 0 in (1.83 m)
- Position: Midfielder

Senior career*
Years	Team	Apps	(Gls)
–2006	Hastings United		
2006–2009	Brighton & Hove Albion	39	(2)
2009	→ Dagenham & Redbridge (loan)	11	(0)
2009–2014	Port Vale	174	(18)
2014–2016	Gillingham	62	(5)
2016–2018	Colchester United	20	(0)
2018–2019	Shrewsbury Town	1	(0)
2019	→ Dagenham & Redbridge (loan)	12	(0)
2019–2021	Billericay Town	28	(2)
2021	Margate	0	(0)
2021–2023	Tonbridge Angels	27	(1)
Total		374	(28)
- * Club domestic league appearances and goals

Douglas James Loft (25 December 1986 – c. 11 October 2026) was an English professional footballer who played as a midfielder. He made 430 league and cup appearances in an 18-year career, scoring 32 goals.

A non-League player at Hastings United, Loft moved to Championship club Brighton & Hove Albion in January 2006. He remained on the fringes of the first team throughout his stay and was loaned out to Dagenham & Redbridge in February 2009. He signed with Port Vale in June 2009, where he found regular first-team football. Voted as the club's Player of the Year in 2012, Loft helped the club secure promotion to League One the following season. He signed for Gillingham in June 2014 before moving to Colchester United in July 2016. He signed with Shrewsbury Town in July 2018 and in January 2019 rejoined Dagenham & Redbridge on loan. He signed with non-League side Billericay Town in July 2019 and moved to Tonbridge Angels in June 2021.

== Career ==
=== Brighton & Hove Albion ===
Born in Maidstone on 25 December 1986, former England Schoolboy international Loft was signed by Brighton & Hove Albion from non-League side Hastings United in January 2006. He made his professional debut for Mark McGhee's side as a 90th-minute substitute in Brighton's 0–0 draw with Preston North End on 11 March 2006. In only his third game, Loft scored his first goal, a consolation in Brighton's 5–1 home defeat by Stoke City on 30 April 2006.

Loft made 13 league and cup appearances for Brighton during his first full season with the club, scoring one goal. He agreed a new one-year deal at the end of the 2006–07 campaign. He made 17 appearances in all competitions during the 2007–08 season, scoring one goal in the FA Cup. He was awarded a new one-year contract in June 2008.

In the 2008–09 season, Loft had made nine appearances for Brighton before joining League Two side Dagenham & Redbridge in February 2009 on loan until the end of the season. After impressing in his loan spell, and after making ten appearances for the Daggers, Brighton manager Russell Slade recalled Loft. He returned to Brighton to make seven further appearances before the end of the campaign.

=== Port Vale ===
In May 2009, Loft was one of 14 players who left Brighton following the expiry of their contracts. He signed for Port Vale on a two-year contract in June 2009, teaming up with former Brighton manager Micky Adams. After missing the opening two weeks of the 2009–10 pre-season with illness, he started to find his best form as he settled in to the side. He was transfer listed in late September, along with the entire Port Vale squad, after Adams saw his team slip to a third consecutive defeat. After calf and heel injuries kept Loft out of contention, he returned to the first-team with a "rasping half-volley" in a 2–2 home draw with Torquay United on 23 November. He ended the season with three goals and 37 appearances in all competitions.

At the beginning of the 2010–11 season, Loft was out of the first-team with suspected bruised ribs. His ribs eventually transpired to be broken, and he had also suffered a collapsed lung, keeping him out of action for three weeks. Despite a tore calf and a hamstring injury keeping him out of action for portions of the second half of the campaign, Loft was awarded a new two-year deal in May 2011.

Loft began the 2011–12 season with four goals in six games, which earned him a nomination for League Two Player of the Month for August, which he missed out on to Dagenham & Redbridge's Mark Arber. After a successful campaign which returned five goals in 46 appearances, Loft was voted as the club's Player of the Year.

He was appointed club captain in July 2012 following the departure of Marc Richards. Adams later said that he made Loft captain owing to his calming presence. He scored his only goal of the season with a 25 yards (23 m) drive in Vale's 2–1 defeat to Oxford United at the Kassam Stadium on 2 March 2013. Three days later, he received a red card for violent conduct in a goalless home draw with Bradford City. Loft featured for Vale 36 times, as the club went on to achieve promotion to League One with a third-place finish. He signed a new one-year contract in the summer.

During the 2013–14 season, Loft had been a regular fixture in the first-team, scoring nine goals in 43 league and cup appearances, until April 2014, when an alleged training ground altercation between Loft and teammate Daniel Jones left Loft out of action for the remainder of the season. Manager Micky Adams stressed that Loft was the innocent party in the confrontation that left Loft with a broken cheekbone and Jones was sacked following a club investigation. He was voted onto Port Vale's team of the 2010s by readers of The Sentinel, alongside Anthony Griffith, in February 2020.

=== Gillingham ===
In June 2014, Loft turned down a new deal to remain with Port Vale, instead choosing to sign for Gillingham on a free transfer. He chose to sign for Gillingham in order to return to his home county of Kent with his young family. He was made club captain, and made his club debut on 9 August 2014 in a 4–2 defeat to Milton Keynes Dons. He was sent off in a 3–0 League One defeat to Scunthorpe United in October 2014, before scoring his first goal for the club in a Football League Trophy win over Crawley Town on 11 November. He ended the season with two goals in 42 appearances.

Loft spent much of the 2015–16 season plagued by injury, missing much of pre-season and the early stages, and suffering an Achilles injury which restricted his number of games to just four between mid-February and May 2016. He scored four goals in 28 games, and was released by the club at the end of the season.

=== Colchester United ===
In July 2016, Loft signed a two-year contract with League Two side Colchester United. He made his debut for the club in the EFL Cup during Colchester's 4–0 defeat by Brighton & Hove Albion. His problematic hamstring and Achilles injuries recurred in late August 2016, keeping him out of first-team action. It was reported on 9 September that Loft would remain out of action for two to three months. He finally made a return to competitive action as a late substitute in Colchester's 1–1 draw with Doncaster Rovers on 14 April 2017, completing the season with nine first-team appearances to his name. He was struck down by a shoulder injury after a bad fall in November 2017. He was released by Colchester at the end of the 2017–18 season after manager John McGreal admitted that "we only ever saw glimpses of him because of his injury problems and it just hasn't worked out for him here".

=== Shrewsbury Town ===
On 21 July 2018, Loft signed a one-year deal with Shrewsbury Town after impressing manager John Askey on a trial basis in pre-season friendlies. However, he failed to break into the "Shrews" first-team, playing just 66 minutes of League One football at the New Meadow. He appeared more frequently in the EFL Trophy and scored his only goal for the club in that competition against Walsall. On 21 January 2019, he returned to Dagenham & Redbridge, who were now playing in the National League, on loan until the end of the 2018–19 season. Manager Peter Taylor said that "he is a very experienced midfield player that I felt we needed". He was released by Shrewsbury manager Sam Ricketts in May 2019.

=== Later career ===
On 17 July 2019, Loft joined National League South club Billericay Town. He scored two goals in 24 appearances in the 2019–20 season, which was permanently suspended on 26 March due to the COVID-19 pandemic in England, with Billericay in 18th-place. He played eight games in the 2020–21 season, which was also curtailed early due to the pandemic.

On 3 June 2021, Loft joined Isthmian League Premier Division club Margate; manager Jay Saunders described him as a "key signing". However, eight days later he was revealed as a Tonbridge Angels signing after he walked out on Margate to remain in the National League South with Tonbridge. He played 27 games in the 2021–22 season and was retained in the summer. However, he played just one game of the 2022–23 campaign before suffering a season-ending ruptured Achilles injury at the end of August.

== Style of play ==
Loft was a versatile midfield player, and in November 2010, was described by Port Vale teammate Gareth Owen as "...one of the fittest at the club, but he's got a lot of skill with it... I've been surprised by how strong he is. He's got a good footballing brain and I like having him outside me (at wing-back) because he always wants the ball and I know he'll do his defensive duties as well. He could play in other positions, and received praise for his performances at left-back and his "excellent attitude" from Port Vale manager Micky Adams.

== Death ==
His death at the age of 39, following a "medical emergency", was reported on 12 October 2026. He was survived by his wife, Laura, and their two daughters.

== Career statistics ==
Appearances and goals by club, season and competition
Club	Season	League			FA Cup		League Cup		Other		Total	
Club	Season	Division	Apps	Goals	Apps	Goals	Apps	Goals	Apps	Goals	Apps	Goals
Brighton & Hove Albion	2005–06	Championship	3	1	0	0	0	0	—		3	1
Brighton & Hove Albion	2006–07	League One	11	1	0	0	2	0	0	0	13	1
Brighton & Hove Albion	2007–08	League One	13	0	3	1	0	0	1 (Note: Appearance(s) in Football League Trophy)	0	17	1
Brighton & Hove Albion	2008–09	League One	12	0	0	0	1	0	3	0	16	0
Brighton & Hove Albion	Total		39	2	3	1	3	0	4	0	49	3
Dagenham & Redbridge (loan)	2008–09	League Two	11	0	—		—		—		11	0
Port Vale	2009–10	League Two	32	3	2	0	3	0	0	0	37	3
Port Vale	2010–11	League Two	29	1	3	0	1	0	1	0	34	1
Port Vale	2011–12	League Two	44	4	1	0	1	1	0	0	46	5
Port Vale	2012–13	League Two	32	1	1	0	1	0	2	0	36	1
Port Vale	2013–14	League One	37	9	3	0	1	0	2	0	43	9
Port Vale	Total		174	18	10	0	7	1	5	0	196	19
Gillingham	2014–15	League One	36	1	1	0	1	0	4	1	42	2
Gillingham	2015–16	League One	26	4	1	0	0	0	1	0	28	4
Gillingham	Total		62	5	2	0	1	0	5	1	70	6
Colchester United	2016–17	League Two	8	0	0	0	1	0	0	0	9	0
Colchester United	2017–18	League Two	12	0	1	0	0	0	0	0	13	0
Colchester United	Total		20	0	1	0	1	0	0	0	22	0
Shrewsbury Town	2018–19	League One	1	0	0	0	0	0	4 (Note: Appearances and goals in EFL Trophy)	1	5	1
Dagenham & Redbridge (loan)	2018–19	National League	12	0	—		—		—		12	0
Billericay Town	2019–20	National League South	21	2	5	0	—		3 (Note: Appearances in Essex Senior Cup)	0	29	2
Billericay Town	2020–21	National League South	7	0	0	0	—		1 (Note: Appearances and goals in FA Trophy)	0	8	0
Billericay Town	Total		28	2	5	0	—		4	0	37	2
Tonbridge Angels	2021–22	National League South	26	1	0	0	—		1	0	27	1
Tonbridge Angels	2022–23	National League South	1	0	0	0	—		0	0	1	0
Tonbridge Angels	Total		27	1	0	0	—		1	0	28	1
Career total			374	28	21	1	12	1	23	2	430	32

== Honours ==
Port Vale

- Football League Two third-place promotion: 2012–13

Individual

- Port Vale Player of the Year: 2011–12
