= Dean Cox (English footballer) =

English football manager (born 1987)

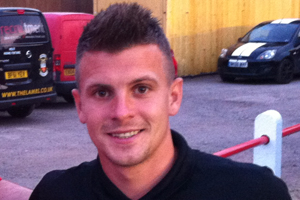
- Cox in 2013

Personal information
- Full name: Dean Arthur Edward Cox
- Date of birth: 12 August 1987 (age 39)
- Place of birth: Haywards Heath, England
- Height: 5 ft 4 in (1.63 m)
- Positions: Winger; attacking midfielder

Youth career
- –2005: Brighton & Hove Albion

Senior career*
Years	Team	Apps	(Gls)
2005–2010	Brighton & Hove Albion	146	(16)
2005	→ Eastbourne Borough (loan)	11	(0)
2006	→ Bognor Regis Town (loan)	1	(0)
2010–2016	Leyton Orient	227	(45)
2016–2018	Crawley Town	26	(2)
2016–2017	→ Burgess Hill Town (loan)	5	(1)
2018–2021	Eastbourne Borough	73	(12)
2021–2022	Worthing	21	(1)
Total		510	(77)

Managerial career
- 2022–2023: Lancing
- 2023: Burgess Hill Town
- 2025: Lancing
- * Club domestic league appearances and goals as of 18:19, 21 September 2025 (UTC)

Dean Arthur Edward Cox (born 12 August 1987) is an English former footballer who was most recently the manager of Lancing. Cox primarily played as a winger, but also played in an attacking midfield role.

== Playing career ==
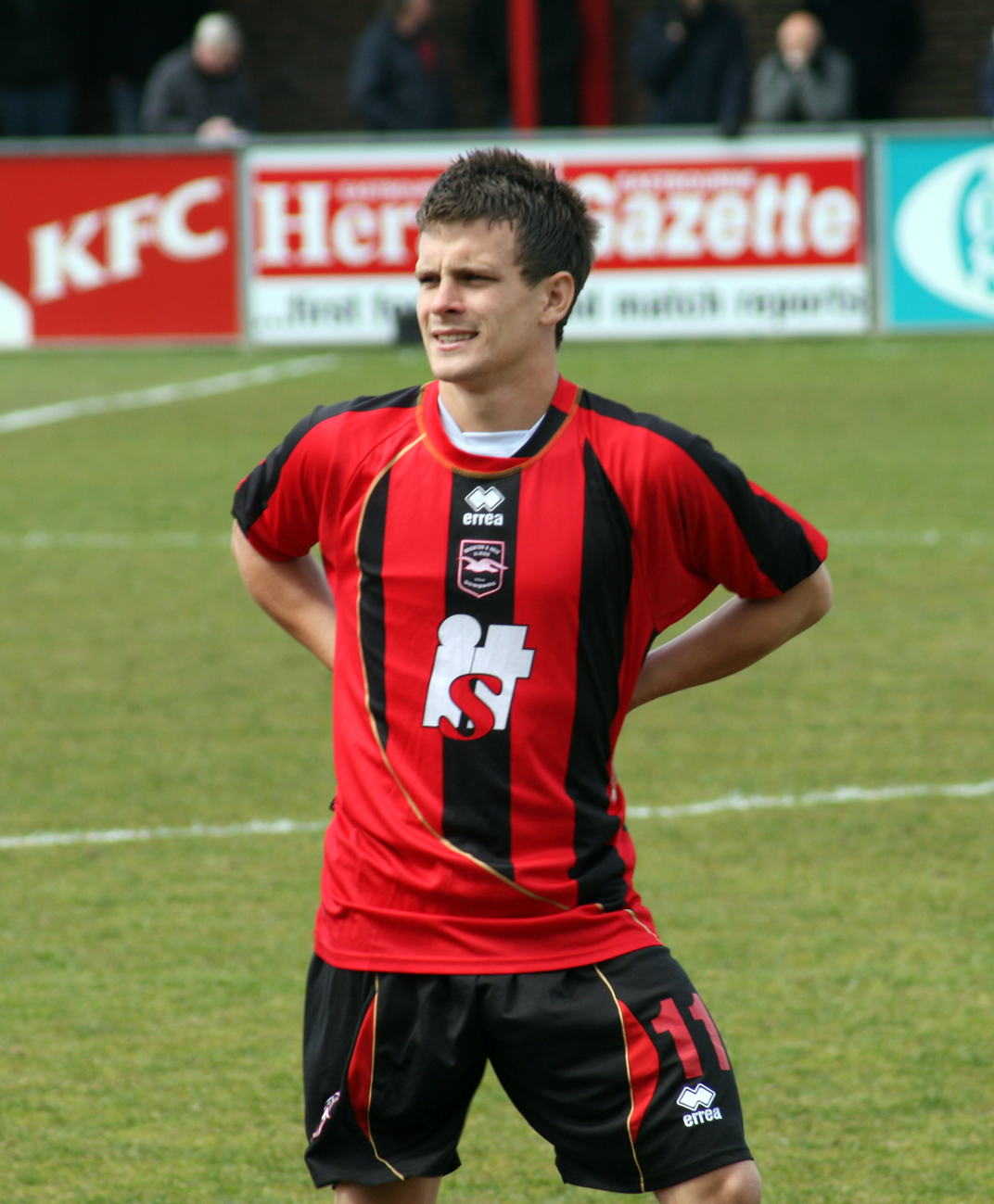
Cox playing for Brighton & Hove Albion's reserve team in 2010

=== Brighton & Hove Albion ===
Cox was born in Haywards Heath, West Sussex. He made his debut for Brighton & Hove Albion during a 2–0 victory over Plymouth Argyle on 29 August 2005. During the 2005–06 season, Cox also spent time on loan at Eastbourne Borough, featuring twice in their run in the FA Cup. Cox's next appearance for Brighton was on the first day of the 2006–07 League One season in the 1–0 victory away at Rotherham United, although he was sent off during this match for receiving two yellow cards. Cox played a major part during his debut season in the first-team playing in 43 League games and scoring six goals.

In the summer of 2007, Cox was rewarded for his fine start to his Albion career by being handed the number 7 shirt, previously occupied by Alexandre Frutos.

After falling out of favour at Brighton, Cox was informed that he would be released from his contract when it expired on 30 June 2010.

=== Leyton Orient ===
Cox was later signed by Leyton Orient on 2 June 2010. He scored his first league goal for the Os on 28 August 2010, in the 3–0 triumph over Exeter City.

On 3 October 2012, in the 2–0 league victory at Walsall, Cox scored a 60-yard goal from inside the Orient half, firing over the head of Walsall goalkeeper Karl Darlow.

Cox was released on 1 September 2016, his contract terminated by mutual consent.

=== Crawley Town ===
On 13 September 2016, Cox joined Crawley Town on a two-and-a-half-year contract.

After signing outside of the summer transfer window, Cox was ineligible to play for Crawley Town until 2 January 2017, so therefore he joined Burgess Hill Town on a loan deal. On 8 October 2016, Cox made his Burgess Hill Town debut in a 3–2 victory over Leatherhead, playing the full 90 minutes. On 25 October 2016, Cox scored his first goal for Burgess Hill Town in a 1–0 victory over Hendon, netting the winner in the 53rd minute.

After a short loan spell with Burgess Hill Town, Cox returned to Crawley and made his debut on 2 January 2017. Featuring for 61 minutes before being replaced by Jordan Roberts, in a 2–0 home victory over Yeovil Town.

On 28 June 2018, it was announced that Cox would leave Crawley, following a mutual termination in his contract.

=== Eastbourne Borough ===
On 3 August 2018, a day before the season began, it was confirmed that Cox had signed for Eastbourne Borough who play in the National League South. In July 2021, Cox departed the club by mutual consent.

== Managerial career ==
On 16 December 2022, it was announced that Cox would take over the managerial position at Lancing.

On 27 April 2023, Cox was appointed manager of Burgess Hill Town having guided Lancing to their highest ever league position.

On 6 December 2023, Cox resigned as manager of Burgess Hill Town.

On 14 May 2025, Cox was re-appointed manager of former club Lancing following their relegation to the Southern Combination Premier Division.

On 21 September 2025, Cox resigned as manager of Lancing.

== Career statistics ==
As of match played 16 February 2021.

Club statistics
Club	Season	League			FA Cup		League Cup		Other		Total	
Club	Season	Division	Apps	Goals	Apps	Goals	Apps	Goals	Apps	Goals	Apps	Goals
Brighton & Hove Albion	2005–06	Championship	1	0	—		0	0	—		1	0
Brighton & Hove Albion	2006–07	League One	42	6	2	2	2	1	4 (Note: Appearance in Football League Trophy)	1	50	10
Brighton & Hove Albion	2007–08	League One	42	6	4	0	1	0	3	1	50	7
Brighton & Hove Albion	2008–09	League One	40	4	2	1	3	0	6	0	51	5
Brighton & Hove Albion	2009–10	League One	21	0	4	0	1	0	1	0	27	0
Brighton & Hove Albion	Total		146	16	12	3	7	1	14	2	179	22
Eastbourne Borough (loan)	2005–06	Conference South	11	0	2	0	—				13	0
Bognor Regis Town (loan)	2005–06	Conference South	1	0	—		—		—		1	0
Leyton Orient	2010–11	League One	45	11	7	0	2	0	2	1	56	12
Leyton Orient	2011–12	League One	38	8	1	0	3	1	1	0	43	9
Leyton Orient	2012–13	League One	44	4	4	4	2	0	5	0	55	8
Leyton Orient	2013–14	League One	45	12	3	2	2	1	6 (Note: Three appearances in Football League Trophy, three in League One play-offs)	2	56	17
Leyton Orient	2014–15	League One	37	6	1	0	3	1	3	0	44	7
Leyton Orient	2015–16	League Two	14	3	1	2	1	0	0	0	16	5
Leyton Orient	2016–17	League Two	4	1	0	0	1	0	0	0	5	1
Leyton Orient	Total		227	45	17	8	14	3	17	3	275	59
Crawley Town	2016–17	League Two	22	2	0	0	0	0	0	0	22	2
Crawley Town	2017–18	League Two	4	0	0	0	1	0	0	0	5	0
Crawley Town	Total		26	2	0	0	1	0	0	0	27	2
Burgess Hill Town (loan)	2016–17	Isthmian League Premier Division	5	1	0	0	—		4 (Note: Three appearances and two goals in FA Trophy, one appearance and one goal in Isthmian League Cup)	3	9	4
Eastbourne Borough	2018–19	National League South	32	7	3	1	—		4 (Note: One appearance and one goal in Sussex Senior Challenge Cup, three appearances and three goals in FA Trophy)	4	39	12
Eastbourne Borough	2019–20	National League South	23	2	1	0	—		6 (Note: Three appearances in Sussex Senior Challenge Cup, three appearances and two goals in FA Trophy)	2	30	4
Eastbourne Borough	2020–21	National League South	18	3	4	0	—		0	0	22	3
Eastbourne Borough	Total		73	12	8	1	—		10	6	91	19
Career total			489	76	39	12	22	4	45	14	595	106

== Managerial statistics ==
As of match played 16 September 2025

Managerial record by team and tenure
Team	From	To	Record				
Team	From	To	G	W	D	L	Win %
Lancing	16 December 2022	26 April 2023	22	8	3	11	36.36
Burgess Hill	27 April 2023	6 December 2023	11	4	3	4	36.36
Lancing	15 May 2025	21 September 2025	13	3	2*	8	23.77

- One of the draws was won by Lancing on penalties but this match counts as a draw in official records
