= Kerry Mayo =

English footballer

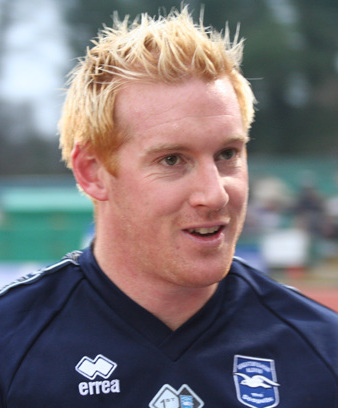
- Mayo with Brighton & Hove Albion

Personal information
- Date of birth: 21 September 1977 (age 49)
- Place of birth: Haywards Heath, England
- Height: 5 ft 10 in (1.78 m)
- Position: Full back

Senior career*
Years	Team	Apps	(Gls)
1995–2009	Brighton & Hove Albion	368	(12)
2008	→ Lewes (loan)	6	(0)
2010–201?	Newhaven		
- * Club domestic league appearances and goals as of 12 May 2009

Kerry Mayo (born 21 September 1977) is an English former professional footballer who played as a left back.

== Career ==
Born in Haywards Heath, West Sussex, Mayo was a trainee with Brighton & Hove Albion and signed a professional contract with them in July 1996. On 6 May 2008, it was confirmed that Mayo, along with the experienced Guy Butters and Gary Hart, had been released from the club by then manager Dean Wilkins. However, after impressing during pre-season under new manager Micky Adams, Hart and Mayo signed new contracts.

In September 2008 Mayo joined Conference National team Lewes on loan for a month. He returned to Brighton on 10 October after suffering cruciate knee ligament damage.

Mayo left Brighton after his contract expired at the end of June 2009. He was one of the club's longest-serving players: during his 14-year career, he had played in 413 league and cup games and scored 14 goals. In July 2009, he announced his retirement from professional football after failing to recover from a groin injury.

On 18 November 2010, Mayo joined his local club, Newhaven, and scored on his debut in a 4–2 win over Pease Pottage.

== Honours ==
Brighton & Hove Albion

- Football League Second Division: 2001–02; play-offs: 2004
- Football League Third Division: 2000–01
