= David Martot =

French footballer (born 1981)

Personal information
- Date of birth: 1 February 1981 (age 45)
- Place of birth: Fécamp, France
- Height: 1.75 m (5 ft 9 in)
- Position: Midfielder

Youth career
- 1998–2001: Le Havre

Senior career*
Years	Team	Apps	(Gls)
2001–2008	Le Havre	111	(11)
2007–2008	→ Brighton & Hove Albion (loan)	26	(1)
2008–2011	Vannes	90	(2)
2011–2013	USJA Carquefou	43	(4)
Total		270	(18)
- * Club domestic league appearances and goals

David Martot (born 1 February 1981) is a French former professional footballer who played as a midfielder.

== Career ==
Martot was born in Fécamp. He rose through the youth system at Le Havre AC before playing for the club's B side in the 2001–02 season. He progressed to the first team in the following season, appearing 25 times in Ligue 1 and scoring two goals. He made the same number of appearances in the 2003–04 season, albeit in Ligue 2 after Le Havre were relegated, scoring once. In 2004–05, Martot took part in only six games, adding one goal to his career total. He managed five goals in 32 appearances during the 2005–06 campaign, and scored twice in 23 games the following season.

Martot joined Brighton on loan for a planned three-month period on 31 August 2007, the last day of the English transfer window. He made his Albion debut during the 3–2 win over Southend on 1 September, playing on the right side of midfield. Martot was often used as a substitute for Brighton during his time there, and came on in the next game against Millwall, scoring the first of his total of two goals for the club. His second goal was scored in a Football League Trophy game at home to Cheltenham in November 2007.

Martot's provisional loan deal at Brighton was due to expire at the end of November 2007, but the club agreed to extend this deal by a further month until the end of December 2007. It was subsequently revealed that Martot had agreed to stay on loan at the Withdean until the end of the 2007–08 season.

On 6 May 2008, it was revealed that Martot, along with Sam Rents and Shane McFaul had been told they could all leave Brighton. Martot returned to his parent club Le Havre.

== Honours ==
Vannes

- Coupe de la Ligue: runner-up 2008–09
