= Adam El-Abd =

Egypt international footballer (born 1984)

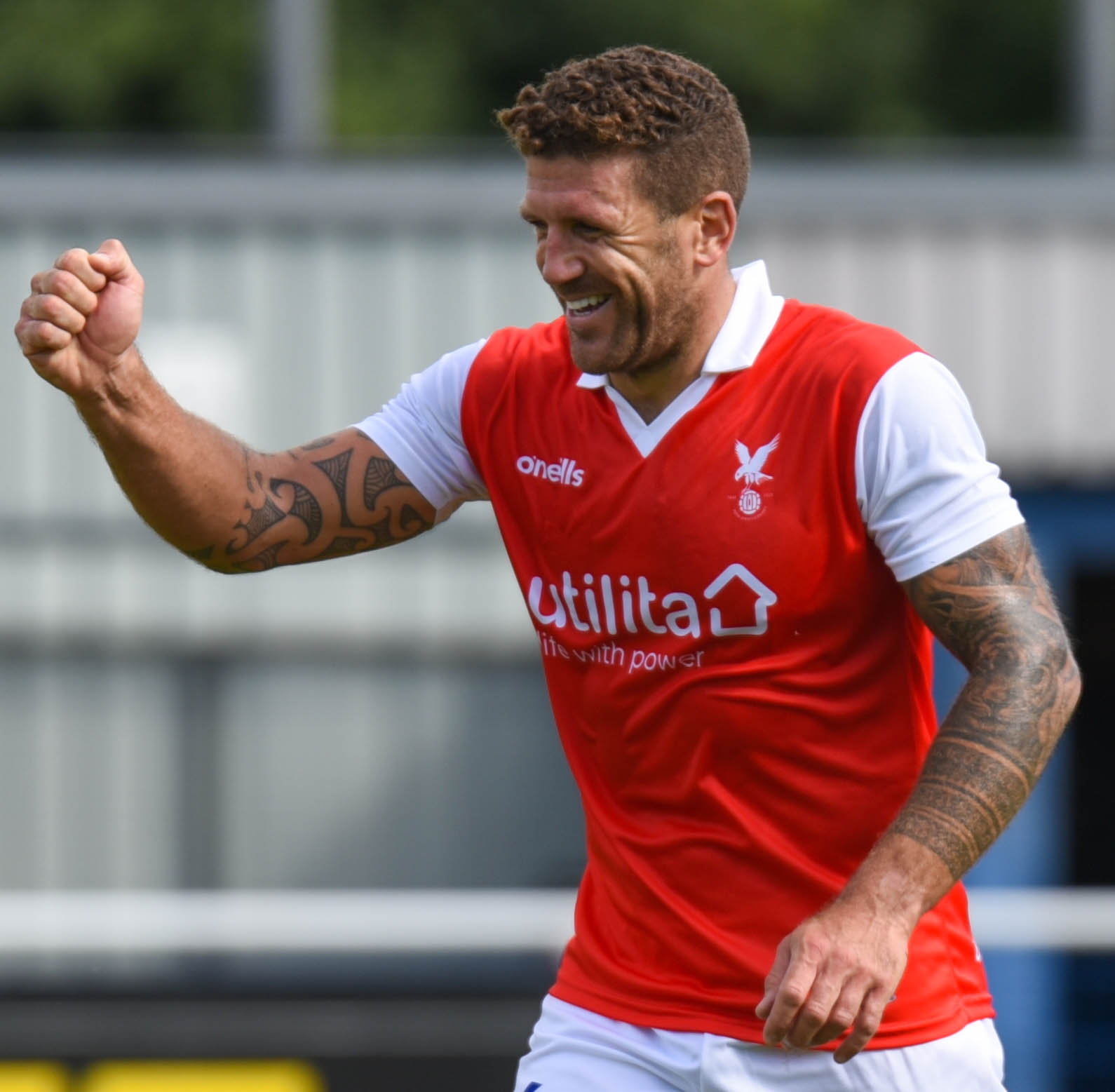
- El-Abd with Whitehawk in 2020

Personal information
- Full name: Adam Mohamad El-Abd
- Date of birth: 11 September 1984 (age 42)
- Place of birth: Brighton, England
- Height: 5 ft 10 in (1.78 m)
- Position: Defender

Youth career
- 1994–2003: Brighton & Hove Albion

Senior career*
Years	Team	Apps	(Gls)
2003–2014	Brighton & Hove Albion	300	(5)
2003	→ Bognor Regis Town (loan)	2	(0)
2014–2016	Bristol City	16	(0)
2014–2015	→ Bury (loan)	24	(1)
2015–2016	→ Swindon Town (loan)	13	(0)
2016	→ Gillingham (loan)	8	(0)
2016–2017	Shrewsbury Town	28	(2)
2017–2019	Wycombe Wanderers	72	(4)
2019–2020	Stevenage	2	(0)
2020–2022	Whitehawk	36	(0)
2022	Worthing	0	(0)
Total		501	(12)

International career
2012–2013	Egypt	7	(0)
- * Club domestic league appearances and goals

Adam Mohamad El-Abd (Arabic: آدم العبد; born 11 September 1984) is a retired professional footballer who played as a defender. El-Abd made over 500 first team appearances in his professional career and also played for the Egypt national team.

== Early and personal life ==
Born in Brighton, East Sussex, to an Egyptian father and a British mother, El-Abd holds dual-nationality. His older brother Joe played professional rugby union and is a coach for the England national rugby union team. His younger brother Sami was an apprentice at Brighton, before moving into non-League football with Crawley Town, Hayes & Yeading United, Whitehawk, Bognor Regis Town, Dorking Wanderers and Horsham.

== Club career ==
=== Brighton & Hove Albion ===
El-Abd joined Brighton & Hove Albion's youth department when he was nine and was granted a scholarship there at 16. He signed his first professional contract of two and a half years at the age of 19. He made his full league début for the club in the 2–1 win at Notts County in November 2003. He was then a regular in the first team squad, playing either in defence at right-back or centre-half, or in a more defensive midfield role.

During the game at Huddersfield Town on 18 March 2008, El-Abd was stretchered off with medial collateral ligament damage and ruled out for the remainder of the season.

In June 2008, El-Abd signed a new two-year deal with Brighton. He won the Seagulls Player of the Season award for their League One winning 2010–11 campaign.

El-Abd hit the milestone of 250 league appearances for Brighton on 7 March 2012, named Man of the Match in a 2–2 draw with Cardiff City. El-Abd made his 300th and final league appearance for the Seagulls coming on as a 90th-minute substitute against Birmingham City on 11 January 2014.

=== Bristol City ===
On 16 January 2014, El-Abd transferred to League One club Bristol City for an undisclosed fee. Rarely used at Bristol City, he spent time out on loan at Bury, Swindon Town, and Gillingham.

=== Shrewsbury Town ===
After his contract at Bristol City expired, he moved to League One club Shrewsbury Town on a free transfer in July 2016, signing a two-year contract, where he immediately became captain in place of the departed Nathaniel Knight-Percival. He scored his first goal for the club in a 2–1 home victory against Chesterfield on 20 August, but was sent off in a 2–1 defeat at former club Bury three weeks later. After the departure of Shrewsbury manager Micky Mellon, El Abd scored a "30 yard half-volley" in a 1–1 draw away at Southend United on 29 October, to hand new boss Paul Hurst a point in his first match in charge.

El-Abd left the club at the end of June 2017 after his contract was cancelled by mutual consent.

=== Wycombe Wanderers ===
On 3 July 2017, El-Abd signed a two-year contract with League Two side Wycombe Wanderers. In May 2018 he extended his contract for a further year, to the end of the 2019–20 season. El-Abd left Wycombe on 2 September 2019 by mutual consent.

=== Stevenage ===
He signed for Stevenage on 6 September 2019, but was released by the Hertfordshire side at the end of the 2019–20 season having made just 4 appearances in all competitions.

=== Whitehawk ===
El-Abd joined Whitehawk on 5 August 2020, firstly as player-assistant manager, then as a player and assistant U18 coach for the 2021–22 season, before leaving at the end of the season.

=== Worthing ===
On 8 June 2022, El-Abd joined newly promoted National League South club Worthing, linking up with former Brighton teammate Adam Hinshelwood, now Worthing manager.

== International career ==
El-Abd stated in a 2005 interview with EgyptianPlayers.com that he intended to play for the Egyptian national side if he got the call.

On 15 May 2012, and for the first time, Egypt national team coach Bob Bradley included El-Abd in the squad for friendly games against Cameroon, Togo, and Senegal, and also against Mozambique in a FIFA World Cup Qualifier.

== Career statistics ==
As of match played 11 February 2020

Appearances and goals by club, season and competition
Club	Season	League			FA Cup		League Cup		Other		Total	
Club	Season	Division	Apps	Goals	Apps	Goals	Apps	Goals	Apps	Goals	Apps	Goals
Brighton & Hove Albion	2003–04	Division Two	11	0	0	0	0	0	2^{[a]}	0	13	0
Brighton & Hove Albion	2004–05	Championship	16	0	0	0	0	0	−		16	0
Brighton & Hove Albion	2005–06	Championship	29	0	1	0	1	0	−		31	0
Brighton & Hove Albion	2006–07	League One	42	0	2	0	1	1	4^{[a]}	0	49	2
Brighton & Hove Albion	2007–08	League One	35	1	4	1	1	0	3^{[a]}	0	43	2
Brighton & Hove Albion	2008–09	League One	31	0	2	0	2	0	5^{[a]}	0	40	0
Brighton & Hove Albion	2009–10	League One	35	1	3	0	1	0	0	0	39	1
Brighton & Hove Albion	2010–11	League One	37	1	2	0	1	0	1^{[a]}	0	41	1
Brighton & Hove Albion	2011–12	Championship	23	0	2	0	0	0	−		25	0
Brighton & Hove Albion	2012–13	Championship	32	1	2	0	0	0	−		34	1
Brighton & Hove Albion	2013–14	Championship	9	0	1	0	1	0	−		11	0
Bognor Regis Town (loan)	2003–04	Isthmian League Premier Division	2	0	−		−		−		2	0
Bognor Regis Town (loan)	Total		302	5	19	1	8	1	15	0	344	7
Bristol City	2013–14	League One	14	0	−		−		−		14	0
Bristol City	2014–15	League One	2	0	1	0	1	0	2^{[a]}	0	6	0
Bristol City	2015–16	Championship	0	0	−		0	0	−		0	0
Bristol City	Total		16	0	1	0	1	0	2	0	20	0
Bury (loan)	2014–15	League Two	24	1	−		−		−		24	1
Swindon Town (loan)	2015–16	League One	13	0	1	0	−		0	0	14	0
Gillingham (loan)	2015–16	League One	8	0	−		−		−		8	0
Shrewsbury Town	2016–17	League One	28	2	3	0	2	0	1^{[a]}	0	34	2
Wycombe Wanderers	2017–18	League Two	36	1	3	0	1	0	3^{[a]}	0	43	1
Wycombe Wanderers	2018–19	League One	34	3	1	0	1	0	1^{[a]}	0	43	1
Wycombe Wanderers	2019–20	League One	2	0	−		0	0	0	0	2	0
Wycombe Wanderers	Total		72	4	4	0	2	0	4	0	82	4
Stevenage	2019–20	League Two	2	0	1	0	−		1^{[a]}	0	4	0
Career total			464	12	29	1	13	1	23	0	530	14

Footnotes

a. appearances in the Football League Trophy.

Bognor Regis Town statistics unavailable

== Honours ==
Brighton & Hove Albion

- Football League One: 2010–11

Individual

- Brighton & Hove Albion Player of the Season: 2010–11
