= Jake Robinson =

English footballer (born 1986)

Personal information
- Full name: Jake David Robinson
- Date of birth: 23 October 1986 (age 40)
- Place of birth: Brighton, England
- Positions: Striker; winger

Senior career*
Years	Team	Apps	(Gls)
2003–2009	Brighton & Hove Albion	123	(13)
2005	→ Aldershot Town (loan)	8	(4)
2009	→ Aldershot Town (loan)	19	(4)
2009–2011	Shrewsbury Town	56	(11)
2011	→ Torquay United (loan)	22	(7)
2011–2013	Northampton Town	57	(4)
2012	→ Luton Town (loan)	7	(0)
2013–2016	Whitehawk	102	(35)
2016–2017	Hemel Hempstead Town	30	(24)
2017–2018	Billericay Town	46	(42)
2018–2019	Maidstone United	11	(2)
2019–2021	Billericay Town	67	(40)
2021–2022	Dartford	25	(10)
2022–2024	Worthing	24	(2)
2024–2025	Newhaven	29	(15)
Total		626	(213)
- * Club domestic league appearances and goals as of 19:47, 21 April 2025 (UTC)

Jake David Robinson (born 23 October 1986) is an English former footballer who played for Brighton & Hove Albion, Northampton Town and is best known for his form at Billericay Town. Robinson played either as a winger or striker.

== Career ==
=== Brighton & Hove Albion ===
Brighton-born Robinson made his debut in September 2003 against Middlesbrough, in a League Cup Second Round tie at the Riverside Stadium, and became Brighton & Hove Albion's youngest-ever scorer (aged 16) three weeks later in a cup match against Forest Green Rovers.

On 28 October 2006, Robinson scored his first hat-trick for Brighton in a League One game against Huddersfield Town, the first hat-trick by a Brighton player in nearly five years. He scored a second hat-trick in the FA Cup game against Northwich Victoria on 11 November 2006.

After finding first-team opportunities difficult at Brighton, Robinson re-joined Aldershot Town on loan for a second loan spell until the end of the season during February 2009.

Robinson scored on his second debut for Aldershot Town during the 3–2 defeat against Exeter City on 14 February 2009, and made 19 appearances in total, scoring just four goals.

It was announced on 12 May 2009, that Robinson would be leaving Brighton after the expiration of his contract at the end of June 2009.

=== Shrewsbury Town ===
In June 2009, Robinson agreed to join League Two side Shrewsbury Town on a two-year contract. Robinson made an excellent start to the 2010–11 season, scoring the third hat-trick of his career as Shrewsbury beat Bradford City 3–1 on the opening day.

On 31 January 2011, Robinson joined Torquay United for the remainder of the season in a deal that could potentially see gulls player Nicky Wroe moving in the opposite direction. He made his debut for the club the day later against Hereford United, scoring within the first 10 minutes of the match. On 2 February it was revealed, however, that the player had not been registered and thus ineligible to play.

Due to an oversight in the loan deal it was revealed that Robinson was eligible to play for Torquay against his parent club Shrewsbury. This proved costly as later on in the season Robinson scored twice for Torquay in their 5–0 victory over Shrewsbury Town. Robinson then went on to play for Torquay in both legs of the League 2 Play-off semi-final, which by coincidence was against Shrewsbury Town. Once again Robinson proved to be a valuable asset to Torquay as they won the first leg 2–0 and drew the second leg 0–0, meaning Torquay were through and Shrewsbury were out.

=== Later career ===
After two year of playing for Northampton Town in League 2, helping them to the League 2 play off final at Wembley, Robinson decided to head back to Brighton to play for Whitehawk. Scoring regularly and helping the team in to the promotion places, many teams enquired about the striker in the English January transfer window. With Whitehawk tasting unexpected promotion, they decided to wave off offers for the in-form striker.

In May 2015, Robinson was named the Fans' Player of the Year at Whitehawk after a run which saw him net 17 goals in the regular Conference South season. He left the club in 2016 to join Hemel Hempstead Town where he scored 25 league goals in his first season.

In March 2017, Robinson became Billericay Town's record signing, joining the club for a fee of £24,000. This record would later be surpassed by the £27,600 signing of Dean Inman.

In April 2018, Robinson wrote himself into the record books at Billericay by becoming their highest ever goalscorer in a season with 52 goals. This feat was completed with league games still left to play, and he increased his tally to 57 before the end of the season.

Robinson made a bright start to the 2018–19 season, scoring 13 league goals for Billericay by 7 December 2018, at which point he left Billericay to sign for Maidstone United, following manager Harry Wheeler. After three months at Maidstone, in which he scored once, Robinson rejoined Billericay in March 2019, following Wheeler once again.

On 13 June 2021, Robinson signed for Dartford.

On 7 June 2022, Robinson signed for Worthing.

In July 2024, Robinson joined Southern Combination Premier Division side Newhaven. A few months later, while still playing for Newhaven, he began an apprenticeship as a train driver for local rail operator Southern. At the end of the 2024-25 season Robinson announced his retirement from football at the age of 38.

== Career statistics ==
As of end of 2023–24 season

Club statistics
Club	Season	League			FA Cup		League Cup		Other		Total	
Club	Season	Division	Apps	Goals	Apps	Goals	Apps	Goals	Apps	Goals	Apps	Goals
Brighton & Hove Albion	2003–04	Second Division	9	0	0	0	1	0	1 (Note: Appearances in Football League Trophy)	1	11	1
Brighton & Hove Albion	2004–05	Championship	10	1	0	0	1	0	—		11	1
Brighton & Hove Albion	2005–06	Championship	27	1	1	0	1	1	—		29	2
Brighton & Hove Albion	2006–07	League One	38	6	3	4	2	0	4	2	47	12
Brighton & Hove Albion	2007–08	League One	34	4	4	0	0	0	1	1	39	5
Brighton & Hove Albion	2008–09	League One	5	1	2	0	1	0	3	0	11	1
Brighton & Hove Albion	Brighton & Hove Albion total		123	13	10	4	6	1	9	4	148	22
Aldershot Town (loan)	2004–05	Conference Premier	8	4	0	0	—		2 (Note: Appearances in Hampshire Senior Cup)	0	10	4
Aldershot Town (loan)	2008–09	League Two	19	4	0	0	0	0	0	0	19	4
Shrewsbury Town	2009–10	League Two	34	3	1	0	1	1	0	0	36	4
Shrewsbury Town	2010–11	League Two	22	8	1	0	1	1	1	0	25	9
Shrewsbury Town	Shrewsbury Town total		56	11	2	0	2	2	1	0	61	130
Torquay United (loan)	2010–11	League Two	22	7	0	0	0	0	3 (Note: Appearances in League Two play-offs)	0	25	7
Northampton Town	2011–12	League Two	32	0	0	0	2	0	0	0	34	0
Northampton Town	2012–13	League Two	25	4	0	0	0	0	2	1	27	5
Northampton Town	Northampton Town total		57	4	0	0	2	0	2	1	61	5
Luton Town (loan)	2012–13	Conference Premier	7	0	1	0	—		0	0	8	0
Whitehawk	2013–14	Conference South	38	9	1	0	—		5 (Note: Three appearances and two goals in FA Trophy, two appearances and two goals in Sussex Senior Cup)	4	44	13
Whitehawk	2014–15	Conference South	34	17	3	3	—		9 (Note: One appearance in FA Trophy, five appearances and two goals in Sussex Senior Cup, two appearances and two goals in Conference South play-offs)	4	46	24
Whitehawk	2015–16	National League South	30	9	1	1	—		0	0	31	10
Whitehawk	Whitehawk total		102	35	5	4	—		14	8	121	47
Hemel Helpstead Town	2016–17	National League South	30	24	0	0	—		0	0	30	24
Billericay Town	2017–18	Isthmian League Premier Division	46	42	0	0	—		0	0	46	42
Maidstone United	2018–19	National League	11	2	0	0	—		0	0	11	2
Billericay Town	2018–19	National League South	20	14	2	0	—		1 (Note: One appearance and one goal in FA Trophy)	1	23	15
Billericay Town	2019–20	National League South	32	14	2	3	—		1 (Note: One appearance and one goal in FA Trophy)	1	35	18
Billericay Town	2020–21	National League South	15	12	0	0	—		0	0	15	12
Billericay Town	Billericay Town total		113	82	4	3	—		2	2	119	87
Dartford	2021–22	National League South	25	10	1	0	—		8 (Note: Two appearances in the London Senior Cup) (Note: Two appearances in the Kent Senior Cup) (Note: Four appearances in the FA Trophy)	7	34	17
Worthing	2022–23	National League South	1	1	0	0	—		0	0	1	1
Worthing	2023–24	National League South	23	1	3	3	—		1 (Note: Appearance in Sussex Senior Cup)	2	27	6
Worthing	Worthing total		24	2	3	3	—		1	2	28	7
Career total			597	198	26	14	10	3	42	24	675	239

== Honours ==
Brighton & Hove Albion

- Football League Second Division: 2003–04

Billericay Town

- Isthmian League Premier Division: 2017–18

Dartford

- Kent Senior Cup: 2019–20
