= Alexis Bertin =

French footballer (born 1980)

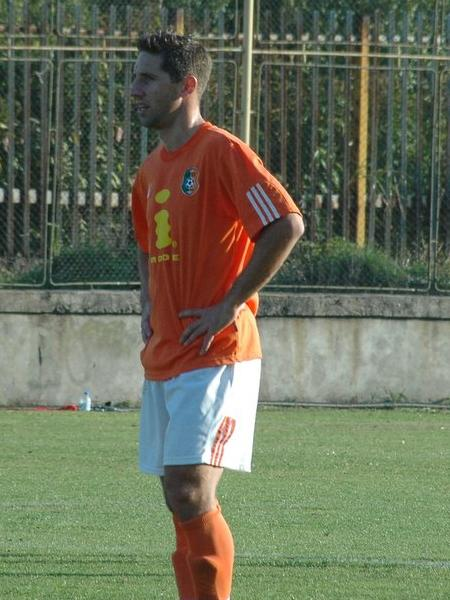

Personal information
- Full name: Alexis Bertin
- Date of birth: 13 May 1980 (age 46)
- Place of birth: Le Havre, France
- Height: 1.75 m (5 ft 9 in)
- Position: Midfielder

Team information
- Current team: Octeville-sur-Mer

Senior career*
Years	Team	Apps	(Gls)
2000–2007	Le Havre AC	117	(2)
2007	Brighton & Hove Albion	16	(0)
2007–2008	Gueugnon	23	(0)
2008–2009	Litex Lovech	11	(0)
2009–2010	AS Cannes	32	(2)
2011–2013	Martigues	48	(1)
2013–2015	Fécamp		
2015–2021	Octeville-sur-Mer		

Managerial career
- 2015–2021: Octeville-sur-Mer
- 2022–2024: AS Trouville-Deauville
- * Club domestic league appearances and goals as of 16:05, 1 August 2013 (UTC)

Alexis Bertin (born 13 May 1980) is a French professional footballer who plays for Octeville-sur-Mer.

Bertin has also played for Ligue 2 side Le Havre and English League One side Brighton & Hove Albion.

Bertin plays usually as a defensive midfielder.

== Litex ==
Bertin made his unofficial debut for Litex in a friendly match against FK Pelister on 1 July 2008. The result of the match was a 5:1 win for Litex.

== Management ==
He became player coach at Octeville-sur-Mer winning the Regional 3 championship. In 2022, after a season away from football he became manager of AS Trouville-Deauville where he stayed until 2024, winning the Regional 1 league, but losing out that year in a play-off for promotion to Grand Quevilly FC.
