= Guy Butters =

English footballer and manager

Personal information
- Date of birth: 30 October 1969 (age 57)
- Place of birth: Hillingdon, England
- Position: Defender

Senior career*
Years	Team	Apps	(Gls)
1988–1990	Tottenham Hotspur	35	(1)
1990	→ Southend United (loan)	16	(3)
1990–1996	Portsmouth	154	(6)
1994	→ Oxford United (loan)	3	(1)
1996–2002	Gillingham	159	(16)
2002–2008	Brighton & Hove Albion	187	(8)
2003	→ Barnet (loan)	7	(0)
2008–2010	Havant & Waterlooville	3	(0)
2009	→ Lewes (loan)	7	(0)
Total		571	(35)

International career
1989	England U21	3	(0)

Managerial career
- 2010–2012: Winchester City
- 2012–2014: Eastleigh (Assistant Manager)
- * Club domestic league appearances and goals

Guy Butters (born 30 October 1969, in Hillingdon) is a former football professional footballer and manager.

== Playing career ==
Butters made his Tottenham debut in November 1988 in a League Cup tie versus Blackburn Rovers in which he scored an own goal. He made his League debut as a goalscoring substitute that weekend in a 3–2 win against Wimbledon, and then started 34 of the next 35 games before making what would be his final appearance away to Charlton Athletic in October 1989. He spent the remainder of the season on loan at Fourth Division Southend United and he was eventually sold to Portsmouth for a fee of £375,000.

He won his first of 3 South East Counties Football League Championships whilst still at school with Spurs. After leaving school he joined them as an apprentice winning Best Defender of the Tournament at the prestigious Düsseldorf Football Tournament 2 years on the trot, firstly beating the Russian National Youth Team in the first year and getting knocked out the semi-finals in the following.

After his apprenticeship he got into the first team within 4 months of being made a pro in 1988, and scored on his league debut versus Wimbledon. During this time he represented England U21 in the Toulon Tournament in France. He won Young Player of the Year for season 89/90. He became the only ever U21 'Rest of the World Team' Captain at the Tournament when he skippered the side against Senegal after the Dutch team went home due to a Surinam plane crash (some of the players were of Surinam origin).

After leaving Spurs he joined Portsmouth in 1990 and went on to be a part of 1992 FA Cup semi final squad, and also the squad that narrowly missed out in the play-off semi finals the following season.

He spent six years at Gillingham, signing for them in October 1996. He played in the Play Off Final at Wembley against Manchester City missing the deciding penalty, but helped the next season by gaining Promotion to second-tier football beating Wigan. He was part of team that played in the FA Cup quarter finals against Chelsea.

In 2002 he joined Brighton & Hove Albion. He was part of the team that gained promotion to the Championship beating Bristol City at the Millennium Stadium in 2004 under manager Mark McGee. He also won Player of the Year in this season as well as the BBC South East Sports Award for Player of the Year.

Butters played his 600th professional game during 2006 having been runner-up in the club's official player of the season awards for the two previous years.

On 6 May 2008, it was confirmed that Butters, along with experienced trio Kerry Mayo, Gary Hart and Paul Reid were to be released from the club.

He ended his professional career but carried on playing non league for a few years beyond this. Butters initially joined Winchester on loan as a player from Havant & Waterlooville in the Conference South following his release from Brighton & Hove Albion.

Butters agreed to join Conference South team Havant & Waterlooville on 30 May 2008, signing a one-year contract. He signed for Lewes on loan in January 2009.

== Managerial career ==
Butters took over at Winchester City in the Wessex League, having been appointed to replace Glenn Cockerill in September 2010. He gained them promotion from the Wessex League before leaving the club on 1 October 2012, to go back to Brighton & Hove Albion, where he was to work for their charity arm, 'Albion in the Community'. Soon after this move however he joined Conference South club Eastleigh as assistant manager to newly appointed manager Richard Hill.

== Honours ==
Gillingham

- Football League Second Division play-offs: 2000

Brighton & Hove Albion

- Football League Second Division play-offs: 2004
