= Joe Gatting =

English footballer and cricketer

Personal information
- Full name: Joe Stephen Gatting
- Born: 25 November 1987 (age 38); Brighton, England
- Height: 6 ft 1 in (1.85 m)
- Batting: Right-handed
- Bowling: Right-arm rapid
- Role: Batsman
- Relatives: Steve Gatting (father); Mike Gatting (uncle)

Domestic team information
- Years: Team
- 2009–2013: Sussex (squad no. 25)
- 2014–2015: Hampshire (squad no. 6)
- FC debut: 15 April 2009 Sussex v Cambridge UCCE
- LA debut: 19 April 2009 Sussex v Gloucestershire

Career statistics
Competition	FC	LA	T20
Matches	47	50	59
Runs scored	1,847	1,030	535
Batting average	29.31	26.41	14.86
100s/50s	3/9	1/4	0/0
Top score	152	122	45*
Balls bowled	246	20	10
Wickets	2	0	1
Bowling average	79.50	–	14.00
5 wickets in innings	0	–	0
10 wickets in match	0	–	0
Best bowling	1/8	–	1/12
Catches/stumpings	20/–	20/–	28/–
- Source: CricketArchive, 2 September 2014

Joe Stephen Gatting (born 25 November 1987) is a cricket coach and former first-class cricketer and footballer who played for Sussex and Hampshire, as well as Brighton & Hove Albion.

== Football career ==
Joe Gatting
Personal information
- Position: Striker

Youth career
- 2003–2005: Brighton & Hove Albion

Senior career*
Years	Team	Apps	(Gls)
2005–2008	Brighton & Hove Albion	44	(4)
2007	→ Woking (loan)	15	(2)
2008	→ Bognor Regis Town (loan)	8	(1)
2008-2009	Whitehawk	13	(16)
2010–2012	Whitehawk	24	(10)
2014-2016	Peacehaven & Telscombe		
2016-2019	Dereham Town	34	(19)
- * Club domestic league appearances and goals

Gatting came through the youth ranks at Brighton & Hove Albion garnering a reputation as a prolific goalscorer. He made his first team debut as a substitute against Southampton on 2 January 2006 and scored in the Seagulls biggest win at Withdean Stadium, an 8–0 victory over Northwich Victoria in the F.A. Cup first round in November 2006.

On 13 September 2007, Gatting joined Conference National side Woking on loan for 3 months after finding first-team opportunities at the Albion difficult after the arrival of summer signing Nicky Forster.

Gatting returned to Brighton in December 2007 and once again found it difficult to find first-team opportunities.

At the start of the 2008–09 season, Gatting joined Conference South side Bognor Regis Town on a month's loan and was released by Brighton & Hove Albion on 31 October 2008, before leaving full-time football altogether to take up a career in cricket.

In November 2008 he signed for Sussex County League team Whitehawk and was selected to play for Sussex after just one appearance. He then linked up with Sussex CCC for winter training and joined the county cricket team on non-contract terms for the 2009 season.

He returned to play for Whitehawk in the 2010–11 season, scoring 12 goals before leaving once more in January 2011 to return to cricket with Sussex. His manager Darren Freeman praised his contribution and hoped to see him return in the future.

In 2014–15 he was playing for the East Sussex side Peacehaven & Telscombe in the Ryman Isthmian Football League, before relocating to Norfolk where he joined Dereham Town of the Isthmian League North Division in July 2016, where he played until the end of the 2018–19 season.

== Cricket career ==
Gatting took up cricket for the 2009 season after giving up full-time football. He was expected to do well in the T20 format of the game.

Gatting scored a century on his debut for Sussex making 110 against Surrey in the Pro ARCH Trophy in Dubai. He then scored 152 during his first-class debut for Sussex against Cambridge University at Fenner's in the opening match of the 2009 domestic season.

A successful start to the season continued at Hove in the Friends Provident Trophy, when on successive days Gatting hit 34 from 47 balls against Surrey, following it up with his maiden List A half century against Durham on Monday 12 May, a round 50 from 61 balls. On 30 August 2009 Gatting was on 99 not out against Yorkshire when the game was abandoned due to rain.

In 2013 he was released after five seasons with Sussex and joined Hampshire on a two-year contract.

At the end of the 2015 season, it was announced that Gatting was one of three players who were being released by Hampshire as their contracts expired.

After moving to Norfolk, Gatting played for six seasons from 2015 to 2021 as the professional for Swardeston Cricket Club near Norwich, in the East Anglian Premier League. During his time there, which also included a spell as vice-captain and then captain, Swardeston won the national NatWest Club T20 title in 2016 and became the first club in the country to do the national club double by winning the Royal London Club Championship at Lord’s and the Vitality Club T20 at Derbyshire.

Having played twice for Minor Counties Northumberland in 2019, he signed to play as Suffolk's red and white ball professional for the 2021 season.

up to 2021, Gatting divided his time between Norfolk and the family home in Adelaide, South Australia, where he had founded Joe Gatting Cricket Coaching in 2020.

In 2020 he was appointed captain and head coach of Tea Tree Gully District Cricket Club, a South Australian Cricket Association A Grade side situated on the outskirts of Adelaide.

In 2024 and 2025 he was playing in the English summer for Great Witchingham CC, near Norwich, as well as coaching for the Root Academy.

== Personal life ==
Joe Gatting is the son of former Arsenal and Brighton & Hove Albion footballer Steve Gatting. His uncle is former England cricketer Mike Gatting.

Gatting attended Cardinal Newman Catholic School in Hove, followed by Brighton College.

He also coached cricket at Norwich School.

Gatting maintains that while playing sport you should always think back and play for the little boy who fell in love with the game.
