= Gary Hart (footballer) =

English footballer (born 1976)

Personal information
- Full name: Gary John Hart
- Date of birth: 21 September 1976 (age 50)
- Place of birth: Harlow, England
- Height: 5 ft 9 in (1.75 m)
- Positions: Striker; utility player

Youth career
- ?–1998: Stansted

Senior career*
Years	Team	Apps	(Gls)
1998–2011	Brighton & Hove Albion	373	(45)
2007–2008	→ Havant & Waterlooville (loan)	5	(0)
2011–2014	Eastbourne Borough	61	(8)
2014–2016	Royston Town	23	(12)
Total		462	(65)

Managerial career
- 2020–: Enfield (Coach)
- * Club domestic league appearances and goals

Gary John Hart (born 21 September 1976) is an English former professional footballer who is a coach for Enfield. Hart spent the majority of his career at Brighton & Hove Albion. He was signed from Stansted in 1998, for £1,000 and a set of tracksuits.

== Career ==
During May 2007, Hart was awarded with a new one-year contract after playing in a certain amount of games for the 2006–07 season. Hart was granted a testimonial year with the "Seagulls" with this deal.

On 6 December 2007, Hart joined Conference South side Havant & Waterlooville on a one-month loan deal. Hart joined fellow ex-Albion player Charlie Oatway at the club who retired from the professional game in the summer of 2007 due to injury. With an injury crisis at Brighton, Hart was recalled from his loan spell on 7 January 2008.

Hart was released by Brighton & Hove Albion manager Dean Wilkins during June 2008, but after Wilkins' sacking he was bought back to the club under manager Micky Adams, with whom both had worked during his first spell as manager at the club.

In May 2011 the club announced that he would be released at the end of the season following the ending of his current contract, along with five other players. On 16 July 2011, Hart was called back to the Brighton Reserves squad for the final time by manager Gus Poyet to captain the side in their Sussex Senior Cup final against Eastbourne Borough. It was the first competitive match to be played at the club's new Falmer Stadium. The home side won the game 2–0 with Hart scoring the first goal at the new ground.

After his release, Hart stayed in Sussex as he signed for Eastbourne Borough on 23 July 2011. Hart was released by Borough on 3 March 2014 and signed for Royston Town of the Southern League Division One Central on 31 March 2014. For the 2014–15 season he was also a coach for youth team Bishop's Stortford Saints U-16s.

== Honours ==
Brighton & Hove Albion

- Football League Second Division: 2001–02;play-offs: 2004
- Football League Third Division: 2000–01
