= Dean Wilkins =

English footballer (born 1962)

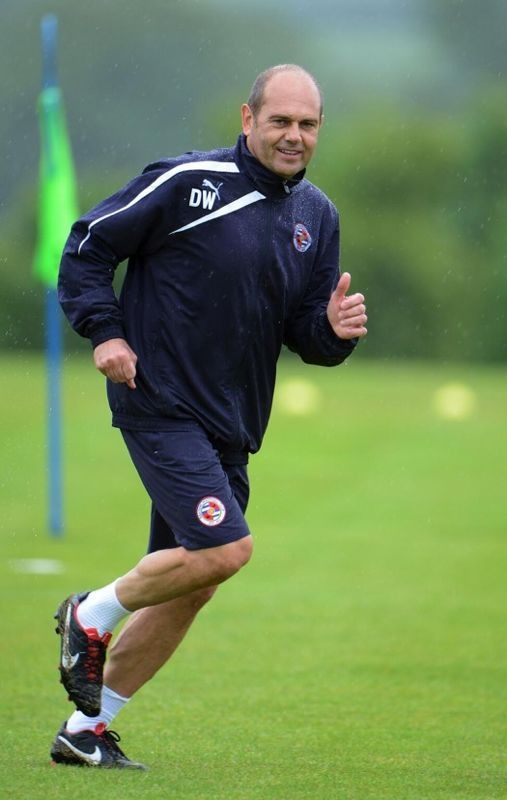

Personal information
- Full name: Dean Mark Wilkins
- Date of birth: 12 July 1962 (age 64)
- Place of birth: Hillingdon, England
- Position: Midfielder

Senior career*
Years	Team	Apps	(Gls)
1980–1983	Queens Park Rangers	2	(0)
1981	MYPA	11	(3)
1982	MYPA	5	(2)
1983–1984	Brighton & Hove Albion	3	(0)
1984	Leyton Orient	10	(0)
1984–1987	PEC Zwolle	89	(3)
1987–1996	Brighton & Hove Albion	335	(31)
Total		462	(39)

Managerial career
- 2006–2008: Brighton & Hove Albion
- 2010: Southampton (caretaker manager)
- * Club domestic league appearances and goals

Dean Mark Wilkins (born 12 July 1962) is an English football coach and former professional player. He is currently player transition coach at EFL Championship club Southampton.

== Managerial career ==
Wilkins assumed the position of caretaker manager at Brighton & Hove Albion when Mark McGhee was sacked in early September 2006. Later that month, it was announced that Wilkins had been given the job on a permanent basis. On 3 April, Wilkins was offered a three-year contract with Brighton & Hove Albion, which was agreed on 24 April.

On 31 July 2009, Wilkins was named as Alan Pardew's assistant manager at Southampton. On 30 August 2010, Wilkins was appointed caretaker manager at Southampton after manager Alan Pardew was sacked, until 12 September when Nigel Adkins was appointed. He was dismissed, along with Adkins, on 18 January 2013.

Following his departure from Southampton, Wilkins was a member of the coaching staff for Reading, Sheffield United and Crystal Palace.

Wilkins was appointed as assistant manager at Stevenage on 18 December 2020, who were in 23rd position in League Two at the time of his appointment. The move meant that Wilkins would be assisting manager Alex Revell, who he had managed during his time as manager at Brighton. He stated the position particularly appealed to him as he was looking to help a first-time manager. Under his leadership Wilkins was able to help Stevenage climb the league table and finish in 14th place. After winning their first two league matches to start the 2021-2022 season Stevenage would only win one game in their next 14, culminating in the departure of manager Alex Revell and assistant manager Dean Wilkins on 14 November 2021.

On 31 January 2026, Wilkins joined Southampton for a second spell as player transition coach.

== Managerial statistics ==
As of match played 11 September 2010

Managerial record by team and tenure
Team	From	To	Record				
Team	From	To	P	W	D	L	Win %
Brighton & Hove Albion	8 September 2006	8 May 2008	102	39	24	39	38.24
Southampton	30 August 2010	12 September 2010	3	0	0	3	0.00
Total			105	39	24	42	37.14
