= 2008–09 Brighton & Hove Albion F.C. season =

107th season in existence of Brighton & Hove Albion

Brighton & Hove Albion
2008–2009 season
- Chairman: Dick Knight
- Manager: Micky Adams (until 21 Feb); Russell Slade (from 6 March)
- League One: 16th
- FA Cup: First Round vs Hartlepool United
- League Cup: Third Round vs Derby County
- Football League Trophy: Area Final vs Luton Town
- Top goalscorer: Nicky Forster, 12
- Highest home attendance: 8,729 vs Manchester City, League Cup, 24 September 2008
- Lowest home attendance: 2,157 vs Leyton Orient, Football League Trophy, 7 October 2008
Home colours	Away colours	Third colours

The 2008–09 season is Brighton & Hove Albion's 107th year in existence and third consecutive season in League One. Along with competing in League One, the club also participated in the FA Cup and the Football League Cup.

This was manager Micky Adams' first season in his second spell at the club, having previously managed Brighton from 1999 to 2001. Adams was sacked on 21 February 2009, after a poor run of form left the side in the relegation zone. Former Yeovil Town manager Russell Slade took over the reins on 6 March, and guided the side to safety on the final day of the season, after the Seagulls had been eight points adrift with six games to play.

== Squad details ==
=== Player info ===
No.	Name	Nat.	Place of birth	Date of birth	Club apps.	Club goals	Int. caps	Int. goals	Previous club	Date joined	Fee
1	Michel Kuipers	(Netherlands)	Amsterdam	26 June 1974	250	–	–	–	Bristol Rovers	27 June 2000	Free
2	Andy Whing	(England)	Birmingham	20 September 1984	96	–	–	–	Coventry City	7 June 2007	Free
3	Kerry Mayo	(England)	Cuckfield	21 September 1977	411	14	–	–	N/A	1 August 1995	Trainee
4	Adam Hinshelwood	(England)	Oxford	8 January 1984	106	2	–	–	N/A	10 August 2002	Trainee
5	Joel Lynch	(England)	Eastbourne	3 October 1987	81	2	–	–	N/A	1 October 2004	Trainee
6	Adam El-Abd	(Egypt)	Brighton (England)	11 September 1984	175	4	–	–	N/A	1 July 2003	Trainee
7	Dean Cox	(England)	Cuckfield	12 August 1987	134	19	–	–	N/A	1 July 2004	Trainee
8	Jason Jarrett	(England)	Bury	14 September 1979	2	–	–	–	Preston North End	25 January 2009	Free
9	Nicky Forster	(England)	Caterham	8 September 1973	66	31	–	–	Hull City	25 June 2007	£75,000
10	Chris Birchall	(Trinidad and Tobago)	Stafford	5 May 1984	4	0	27	4	Coventry	16 January 2009	Free
11	Kevin McLeod	(England)	Liverpool	12 September 1980	21	2	–	–	Colchester United	3 June 2007	Free
13	John Sullivan	(England)	Brighton	8 March 1988	14	–	–	–	N/A	26 December 2005	Trainee
14	David Livermore	(England)	Edmonton	20 May 1980	20	1	–	–	Hull City	3 August 2008	Free
15	Gary Hart	(England)	Harlow	21 September 1976	382	46	–	–	Stansted	1 August 1998	£1,000
16	Colin Hawkins	(Republic of Ireland)	Galway	17 August 1977	24	–	–	–	Coventry City	29 May 2008	Free
17	Glenn Murray	(England)	Maryport	25 September 1983	47	19	–	–	Rochdale	29 September 2008	£300,000
18	Doug Loft	(England)	Maidstone	25 December 1986	41	3	–	–	Hastings United	1 January 2006	Free
19	Jake Robinson	(England)	Brighton	23 October 1986	148	22	–	–	N/A	1 July 2003	Trainee
20	Jimmy McNulty	(Scotland)	Liverpool (England)	13 February 1985	–	–	–	–	Stockport County	2 February 2009	£150,000
21	Jonny Dixon	(Spain)	Murcia	16 January 1984	5	–	–	–	Aldershot Town	30 January 2008	£55,000
22	Tom Fraser	(England)	Brighton	5 December 1987	85	2	–	–	N/A	1 July 2006	Trainee
23	Adam Virgo	(Scotland)	Brighton	23 January 1983	95	17	–	–	Celtic	30 June 2008	Free
24	Tommy Elphick	(England)	Brighton	7 September 1987	82	3	–	–	N/A	9 December 2005	Trainee
25	Craig Davies	(Wales)	Burton upon Trent (England)	9 January 1986	–	–	6	–	Oldham Athletic	2 February 2009	Undisclosed fee
26	Calvin Andrew	(England)	Luton	19 December 1986	1	1	–	–	Crystal Palace	Loan	29 January 2009
28	Sébastien Carole	(France)	Paris	8 September 1982	43	2	–	–	Darlington	Free	29 January 2009
29	Kane Wills	(England)	Shoreham-by-Sea	25 March 1990	–	–	–	–	N/A	1 August 2008	Trainee
30	Kane Louis	(England)	Brighton	21 May 1990	–	–	–	–	N/A	1 August 2008	Trainee
31	Dan Royce	(England)	Chichester	26 November 1989	–	–	–	–	N/A	1 August 2008	Trainee
32	Andy Pearson	(England)	Brighton	19 September 1989	–	–	–	–	N/A	1 August 2008	Trainee
33	Sam Gargan	(England)	Brighton	24 January 1989	–	–	–	–	N/A	1 August 2007	Trainee
34	Steve Cook	(England)	Hastings	19 April 1991	–	–	–	–	N/A	1 September 2008	Trainee
35	Steve Brinkhurst	(England)	Lewes	28 March 1991	–	–	–	–	N/A	1 September 2008	Trainee
36	Paul Crichton	(England)	Pontefract	3 October 1968	–	–	–	–	King's Lynn	1 July 2007	Free
37	Josh Pelling	(England)	Hastings	22 April 1991	–	–	–	–	N/A	1 July 2008	Trainee

== Pre-season friendlies ==
9 July 2008	Athlone Town	0–0	Brighton & Hove Albion	Lissywoollen, Athlone
19:45		Report

12 July 2008	Worthing	0–4	Brighton & Hove Albion	Woodside Road, Worthing
15:00		Report	McLeod 2'; Murray 18'; Hawkins 71'; Chamberlain 79'

15 July 2008	Bognor Regis Town	2–4	Brighton & Hove Albion	Nyewood Lane, Bognor Regis
19:45	Jupp 21'; Fisher 89'	Report	McLeod 11', 50'; Elphick 37'; Cox 69'

16 July 2008	Burgess Hill Town	0–2	Brighton & Hove Albion	Leylands Park, Burgess Hill
19:45		Report	Thomson 30'; Hart 48'

19 July 2008	Lewes	1–1	Brighton & Hove Albion	The Dripping Pan, Lewes
19:00	Wallis-Taylor 78'	Report	Loft 89'

22 July 2008	Havant & Waterlooville	2–4	Brighton & Hove Albion	West Leigh Park, Havant
19:45	Gasson 18'; Henry 76'	Report	Forster 24', 35'; Murray 40', 57'

23 July 2008	Stansted	1–3	Brighton & Hove Albion XI	Hargrave Park, Stansted
19:45	Seymour 67'	Report	Gatting 14', 59'; Pearson 55'

26 July 2008	Brighton & Hove Albion	0–1	Charlton Athletic	Withdean Stadium, Brighton
15:00		Report	Dickson 58'

26 July 2008	Brighton & Hove Albion	2–3	Ipswich Town	Withdean Stadium, Brighton
15:00	Forster 52'; McLeod 59'	Report	Lisbie 19'; Miller pen 70', pen 73'

30 July 2008	Selsey	0–4	Brighton & Hove Albion	The High Street Ground, Selsey
19:30		Report	Gargan 15', 45', 65'; Robinson 70'

2 August 2008	Luton Town	0–3	Brighton & Hove Albion	Kenilworth Road, Luton
19:45		Report	Forster 59'; Cox 76'; Murray 85'

6 August 2008	Crowborough Athletic	1–0	Brighton & Hove Albion	Crowborough Community Stadium, Crowborough
19:45	Tate 84'	Report

== Competitions ==
=== League One ===
==== Results ====
9 August 2008	Crewe Alexandra	1–2	Brighton & Hove Albion	Gresty Road, Crewe
15:00	Zola 85'	Report	Virgo 36'; Forster 90'	Attendance: 4,557; Referee: Jonathan Moss

16 August 2008	Brighton & Hove Albion	1–1	Bristol Rovers	Withdean Stadium, Brighton
15:00	Forster pen 10'	Report	Lambert pen 86'	Attendance: 6,210; Referee: Trevor Kettle

22 August 2008	Southend United	0–2	Brighton & Hove Albion	Roots Hall, Southend-on-Sea
19:45	Moussa (red card) 63'	Report	Murray 74'; Forster 89'	Attendance: 7,976; Referee: Jarnail Singh

30 August 2008	Brighton & Hove Albion	0–0	Leyton Orient	Withdean Stadium, Brighton
15:00		Report		Attendance: 6,675; Referee: Fred Graham

6 September 2008	Brighton & Hove Albion	1–4	Scunthorpe United	Withdean Stadium, Brighton
15:00	Robinson 75'	Report	Woolford 4'; Hooper 45', 55', 68'	Attendance: 5,529; Referee: Phil Crossley

13 September 2008	Yeovil Town	1–1	Brighton & Hove Albion	Huish Park, Yeovil
15:00	Way 80'	Report	Forster pen 77'; Anyinsah (red card) 62'	Attendance: 4,451; Referee: Paul Taylor

20 September 2008	Brighton & Hove Albion	0–1	Walsall	Withdean Stadium, Brighton
15:00		Report	Mattis 44'; Weston (red card) 15'; Sansara (red card) 33'	Attendance: 5,679; Referee: Mike Thorpe

27 September 2008	Northampton Town	2–2	Brighton & Hove Albion	Sixfields Stadium, Northampton
15:00	Murray 45' (pen.), 90'	Report	Akinfenwa 77', 90'	Attendance: 5,389; Referee: Andy Hall

4 October 2008	Brighton & Hove Albion	3–3	Cheltenham Town	Withdean Stadium, Brighton
15:00	Murray 1', 7', 47'	Report	Murray 2', 45'; Gallinagh 90'	Attendance: 5,859; Referee: Gavin Ward

11 October 2008	Leeds United	3–1	Brighton & Hove Albion	Elland Road, Leeds
15:00	Becchio 44'; Beckford 44', 90'	Report	Murray 90'	Attendance: 22,726; Referee: Carl Boyeson

18 October 2008	Brighton & Hove Albion	0–0	Hereford United	Withdean Stadium, Brighton
15:00		Report		Attendance: 5,608; Referee: Mick Russell

21 October 2008	Peterborough United	0–0	Brighton & Hove Albion	London Road, Peterborough
19:45		Report		Attendance: 5,772; Referee: S J Bratt

25 October 2008	Hartlepool United	1–0	Brighton & Hove Albion	Victoria Park, Hartlepool
15:00	Kyle 12'	Report		Attendance: 3,962; Referee: Darren Drysdale

28 October 2008	Brighton & Hove Albion	3–2	Leicester City	Withdean Stadium, Brighton
19:45	Johnson 60', 84'; Hobbs (own goal) 89'	Report	Matt Fryatt 35', 42'	Attendance: 6,282; Referee: Keith Hill

1 November 2008	Brighton & Hove Albion	4–1	Millwall	Withdean Stadium, Brighton
15:00	Murray 45', 57'; Johnson 65'; Cox 81'	Report	Kandol 49'	Attendance: 5,973; Referee: Alan Wiley

15 November 2008	Carlisle United	3–1	Brighton & Hove Albion	Brunton Park, Carlisle
15:00	Bridge-Wilkinson 31', 55'; Taylor 45'	Report	Richards 64'	Attendance: 5,333; Referee: D Webb

22 November 2008	Brighton & Hove Albion	0–1	Huddersfield Town	Withdean Stadium, Brighton
15:00		Report	Collins 50'	Attendance: 6,461; Referee: S Cook

25 November 2008	Stockport County	2–0	Brighton & Hove Albion	Edgeley Park, Stockport
19:45	Blizzard 33'; Davies (pen) 66'	Report		Attendance: 5,201; Referee: C Webster

6 December 2008	Oldham Athletic	1–1	Brighton & Hove Albion	Boundary Park, Oldham
15:00	Liddell (pen) 9'	Report	Murray 20'	Attendance: 4,803; Referee: D Foster

12 December 2008	Brighton & Hove Albion	2–4	MK Dons	Withdean Stadium, Brighton
19:45	B Johnson 3'; Fleetwood 88'	Report	Ángel Llera 26'; J Johnson 46'; Leven 69'; Puncheon 90'	Attendance: 5,691; Referee: R East

20 December 2008	Tranmere Rovers	1–0	Brighton & Hove Albion	Prenton Park, Tranmere
15:00	Kay 90'	Report		Attendance: 4,885; Referee: S Mathieson

26 December 2008	Brighton & Hove Albion	1–2	Colchester United	Withdean Stadium, Brighton
15.00	Forster 21'	Report	Hinshelwood (own goal) 35'; Vernon 87'	Attendance: 6,269; Referee: R Shoebridge

28 December 2008	Swindon Town	0–2	Brighton & Hove Albion	County Ground, Swindon
15:00		Report	Forster 43', (pen) 52'	Attendance: 8,438; Referee: Oliver Langford

17 January 2009	Brighton & Hove Albion	0–2	Leeds United	Withdean Stadium, Brighton
15:00		Report	Trundle 61'; Delph 82'	Attendance: 7,096; Referee: P Miller

24 January 2009	Cheltenham Town	2–2	Brighton & Hove Albion	Whaddon Road, Cheltenham
15:00	Westlake 7'; Westwood 58'	Report	Forster 78'; Hinshelwood 90'	Attendance: 3,597; Referee: Chris Sarginson

27 January 2009	Leicester City	0–0	Brighton & Hove Albion	Walkers Stadium, Leicester
19:45		Report		Attendance: 17,410; Referee: Craig Pawson

31 January 2009	Brighton & Hove Albion	2–1	Hartlepool United	Withdean Stadium, Brighton
15:00	Forster 59'; Andrew 90'	Report	Nelson 19'	Attendance: 5,784; Referee: D Whitestone

10 February 2009	Brighton & Hove Albion	2–4	Peterborough United	Withdean Stadium, Brighton
	Davies 27'; McNulty	Report	Mackail-Smith 38'; McLean 42', 76'; Keates 65' (pen.)	Attendance: 5,087; Referee: James Linington

14 February 2009	Brighton & Hove Albion	0–2	Carlisle United	Withdean Stadium, Brighton
	Anyinsah 24'; Keogh 28'	Report		Attendance: 5,529; Referee: Iain Williamson

21 February 2009	Millwall	0–1	Brighton & Hove Albion	Bermondsey
15:00		Report	Virgo 73'	Stadium: The Den; Attendance: 9,226; Referee: Rob Styles

24 February 2009	Brighton & Hove Albion	1–1	Northampton Town	Brighton
15:00	Elphick 57'	Report	Gilligan 45'	Stadium: Withdean Stadium; Attendance: 5,062; Referee: Trevor Kettle

28 February 2009	Brighton & Hove Albion	0–4	Crewe Alexandra	Brighton
15:00			Jones 24' (pen.), 84'; Schumacher 79'; Sigurdsson 89'	Stadium: Withdean Stadium; Attendance: 6,366; Referee: Graham Horwood

7 March 2009	Leyton Orient	2–1	Brighton & Hove Albion	Leyton
15:00	McGleish 45' (pen.); Thornton 88'	Report	Heath 17'	Stadium: Matchroom Stadium; Attendance: 5,885; Referee: Richard Beeby

10 March 2009	Brighton & Hove Albion	1–3	Southend United	Brighton
19:45	Owusu 45'	Report	Barnard 23', 85'; Robinson 89'	Stadium: Withdean Stadium; Attendance: 5,035; Referee: Darren Deadman

14 March 2009	Brighton & Hove Albion	5–0	Yeovil Town	Brighton
15:00	Cox 16', 89'; Forster 29', 62'; Murray 80' (pen.)	Report		Stadium: Withdean Stadium; Attendance: 6,291; Referee: Steve Bratt

17 March 2009	Walsall	3–0	Brighton & Hove Albion	Walsall
19:45	Bradley 14'; Deeney 30'; Gerrard 39'	Report		Stadium: Bescot Stadium; Attendance: 3,549; Referee: Gavin Ward

21 March 2009	Scunthorpe United	2–0	Brighton & Hove Albion	Scunthorpe
15:00	Hooper 42'; McCann 80' (pen.)	Report	Heath (red card) 78'	Stadium: Glanford Park; Attendance: 4,404; Referee: Graham Salisbury

28 March 2009	Brighton & Hove Albion	0–0	Tranmere Rovers	Brighton
15:00		Report		Stadium: Withdean Stadium; Attendance: 5,819; Referee: Simon Hooper

4 April 2009	MK Dons	2–0	Brighton & Hove Albion	Milton Keynes
15:00	Gerba 29'; Puncheon 40'	Report		Stadium: Stadium MK; Attendance: 15,842; Referee: Steve Tanner

7 April 2007	Hereford United	1–2	Brighton & Hove Albion	Hereford
19:45	Taylor 90'	Report	Fraser 9'; Owusu 75'	Stadium: Edgar Street; Attendance: 2,033; Referee: Jonathan Moss

11 April 2009	Brighton & Hove Albion	2–3	Swindon Town	Brighton
15:00	Virgo 28'; Dicker 90'	Report	Greer 47'; Paynter 50'; Cox 53'	Stadium: Withdean Stadium; Attendance: 6,549; Referee: Fred Graham

13 April 2009	Colchester United	0–1	Brighton & Hove Albion	Colchester
15:00		Report	Owusu 57'	Stadium: Weston Homes Community Stadium; Attendance: 4,873; Referee: Russell Booth

18 April 2009	Brighton & Hove Albion	3–1	Oldham Athletic	Brighton
15:00	Cox 26'; Owusu 37', 64'	Report	Lewis Alessandra 62'	Stadium: Withdean Stadium; Attendance: 6,618; Referee: Steven Cook

21 April 2009	Bristol Rovers	1–2	Brighton & Hove Albion	Bristol
15:00	Lambert 29'	Report	Owusu 43'; Andrew 52'	Stadium: Memorial Stadium; Attendance: 6,193; Referee: Kevin Friend

25 April 2009	Huddersfield Town	2–2	Brighton & Hove Albion	Huddersfield
15:00	Booth 16'; Collins 57'	Report	Andrew 38'; Owusu 66'	Stadium: Galpharm Stadium; Attendance: 4,740; Referee: Graham Laws

2 May 2009	Brighton & Hove Albion	1–0	Stockport County	Brighton
15:00	Forster 73'	Report		Stadium: Withdean Stadium; Attendance: 8,618; Referee: Kevin Wright

==== Table ====
Pos	Team	Pld	W	D	L	GF	GA	GD	Pts
14	Leyton Orient	46	15	11	20	45	57	−12	56
15	Swindon Town	46	12	17	17	68	71	−3	53
16	Brighton & Hove Albion	46	13	13	20	55	70	−15	52
17	Yeovil Town	46	12	15	19	41	66	−25	51
18	Stockport County	46	16	12	18	59	57	+2	50 (Note: Stockport County deducted 10 points for entering administration.)

Updated to match(es) played on 2 May 2009. Source: The Football League
Rules for classification: 1) points; 2) goal difference; 3) number of goals scored.

==== Results summary ====
Overall								Home						Away					
Pld	W	D	L	GF	GA	GD	Pts	W	D	L	GF	GA	GD	W	D	L	GF	GA	GD
46	13	13	20	55	70	−15	52	6	6	11	32	40	−8	7	7	9	23	30	−7

Last updated: 31 January 2009.
Source: BHAFC League One Results

==== Round by round ====
Round	1	2	3	4	5	6	7	8	9	10	11	12	13	14	15	16	17	18	19	20	21	22	23	24	25	26	27	28	29	30	31	32	33	34	35	36	37	38	39	40	41	42	43	44	45	46
Ground	A	H	A	H	H	A	H	A	H	A	H	A	A	H	H	A	H	A	A	H	A	H	A	H	A	H	A	A	H	H	A	H	A	H	A	A	H	H	A	H	A	H	A	H	A	H
Result	W	D	W	D	L	D	L	D	D	L	D	D	L	W	W	L	L	L	D	L	L	L	W	L	D	D	W	L	L	L	W	D	L	L	L	W	L	L	D	W	L	W	W	W	D	W
Position	7	4	1	4	8	11	13	14	14	17	17	17	18	15	14	15	17	19	20	20	21	21	19	20	20	21	20	20	21	21	21	22	22	22	22	22	22	22	22	22	22	22	22	19	20	16

Updated to match(es) played on 31 January 2009. Source: BHAFC League One Results
A = Away; H = Home; W = Win; D = Draw; L = Loss

=== FA Cup ===
8 November 2008 First round	Brighton & Hove Albion	3–3	Hartlepool United	Withdean Stadium, Brighton
15:00	McLeod 19'; Cox 36'; Fleetwood 78'	Report	Hawkins (own goal) 53'; Brown 55'; Monkhouse 69'	Attendance: 2,545; Referee: Keith Woolmer

18 November 2008 First round replay	Hartlepool United	2–1	Brighton & Hove Albion	Victoria Park, Hartlepool
19:45	Porter (pen) 67'; Liddle 70'	Report	Forster 28'	Attendance: 3,288; Referee: M Haywood

=== Football League Cup ===
12 August 2008 First round	Brighton & Hove Albion	4–0	Barnet	Withdean Stadium, Brighton
19:45	Virgo 2', 35'; Forster 28'; Richards 43'; Murray (red card) 85'	Report	Gillet (red card) 70'	Attendance: 2,571; Referee: Roger East

24 September 2008 Second round	Brighton & Hove Albion	2–2 (5–3 p)	Manchester City	Withdean Stadium, Brighton
19:45	Murray 89'; Anyinsah 95'	Report	Fernandes 64'; Ireland 108'	Attendance: 8,729; Referee: Andy D'Urso
	Penalties
	Livermore (penalty scored); Elphick (penalty scored); Murray (penalty scored); Virgo (penalty scored); Richards (penalty scored)		(penalty scored) Evans; (penalty scored) Elano; (penalty scored) Kompany; (penalty missed) Ball

4 November 2008 Third round	Brighton & Hove Albion	1–4	Derby County	Withdean Stadium, Brighton
19:45	Elphick 36'	Report	Villa 28', 73', 87'; Ellington 34'	Attendance: 6,625; Referee: Kevin Friend

=== Football League Trophy ===
Southern Section

2 September 2008 First Round	Northampton Town	0–1	Brighton & Hove Albion	Sixfields Stadium, Northampton
19:45		Report	McLeod 68'	Attendance: 2,047; Referee: Patrick Miller

7 October 2008 Second Round	Brighton & Hove Albion	2–2 (5–4 p)	Leyton Orient	Withdean Stadium, Brighton
19:45	Virgo pen 5'; Anyinsah 14'	Report	Jarvis 21'; Boyd pen 72'	Attendance: 2,157; Referee: James Linnignton
	Penalties
	Savage (penalty missed); Elphick (penalty scored); Thornton (penalty scored); Virgo (penalty scored); Richards (penalty scored); El-Abd (penalty scored)		(penalty missed) Gray; (penalty scored) Demetriou; (penalty scored) Terry; (penalty scored) Palmer; (penalty scored) Boyd; (penalty missed) Ashworth

12 November 2008 Quarter-Final	Brighton & Hove Albion	2–0	Swindon Town	Withdean Stadium, Brighton
19:45	Forster pen 24'; Livermore 75'	Report	McLeod 68'	Attendance: 2,234; Referee: P Crossley

16 December 2008 Semi-final	Shrewsbury Town	0–0 (4–5 p)	Brighton & Hove Albion	New Meadow, Shrewsbury
19:45		Report		Attendance: 4,052; Referee: Keith Hill
	Penalties
	Davies (penalty scored); McIntyre (penalty scored); Leslie (penalty scored); Cansdell-Sherriff (penalty scored); Holt (penalty missed)		(penalty scored) Forster; (penalty scored) Virgo; (penalty scored) Elphick; (penalty scored) Robinson; (penalty scored) Richards

20 January 2009 Final 1st leg	Brighton & Hove Albion	0–0	Luton Town	Withdean Stadium, Brighton
19:45		Report		Attendance: 6,127; Referee: Paul Taylor

17 February 2009 Final 2nd leg	Luton Town	1–1 (a.e.t.) (4–3 p)	Brighton & Hove Albion	Luton
19:45	Craddock 2'	Report	Forster 20'; Livermore (red card) 45'	Stadium: Kenilworth Road; Attendance: 8,711; Referee: Andy D'Urso
	Penalties
	Martin (penalty scored); Craddock (penalty scored); Hall (penalty scored); Charles (penalty scored)		(penalty scored) Forster; (penalty scored) Virgo; (penalty scored) Elphick; (penalty missed) Jarrett; (penalty missed) Birchall

== League One Data ==
=== Appearances and goals ===
No.	Pos	Nat	Player	Total		League One		League Cup		Football League Trophy		FA Cup	
No.	Pos	Nat	Player	Apps	Goals	Apps	Goals	Apps	Goals	Apps	Goals	Apps	Goals
1	GK	(Netherlands) NED	Michel Kuipers	34	0	28	0	2	0	3	0	1	0
2	DF	(England) ENG	Andy Whing	49	0	40	0	3	0	4	0	2	0
3	DF	(England) ENG	Kerry Mayo	2	0	0+2	0	0	0	0	0	0	0
4	DF	(England) ENG	Adam Hinshelwood	15	1	11+3	1	0	0	1	0	0	0
5	DF	(England) ENG	Joel Lynch (on loan to Nottingham Forest)	3	0	0+2	0	0	0	1	0	0	0
6	DF	(Egypt) EGY	Adam El-Abd	39	0	25+6	0	4	0	2	0	2	0
7	MF	(England) ENG	Dean Cox	49	2	32+8	1	3	0	4	0	2	1
8	MF	(England) ENG	Jason Jarrett	13	0	11+2	0	0	0	0	0	0	0
9	FW	(England) ENG	Nicky Forster	36	12	26+4	9	1	1	3	1	2	1
10	MF	(Trinidad and Tobago) TRI	Chris Birchall	9	0	8+1	0	0	0	0	0	0	0
11	MF	(England) ENG	Kevin McLeod	27	2	11+10	0	2	0	3	1	1	1
13	GK	(England) ENG	John Sullivan	16	0	13	0	1	0	1	0	1	0
14	MF	(England) ENG	David Livermore	23	1	12+4	0	3	0	3	1	1	0
15	MF	(England) ENG	Gary Hart	11	0	7+4	0	0	0	0	0	0	0
17	DF	(Republic of Ireland) IRL	Colin Hawkins	23	0	17	0	2	0	2	0	2	0
17	FW	(England) ENG	Glenn Murray	28	11	18+5	10	3	1	1	0	1	0
18	MF	(England) ENG	Doug Loft (on loan to Dagenham & Redbridge)	16	0	7+5	0	1	0	3	0	0	0
19	FW	(England) ENG	Jake Robinson	10	1	0+5	1	1	0	2	0	2	0
20	DF	(Scotland) SCO	Jimmy McNulty	5	0	5	0	0	0	0	0	0	0
21	FW	(Spain) ESP	Jonny Dixon (on loan to Eastleigh)	1	0	0+1	0	0	0	0	0	0	0
22	MF	(England) ENG	Tom Fraser	33	0	18+9	0	2	0	2	0	2	0
23	DF	(England) ENG	Adam Virgo	43	4	36	1	2	2	4	1	1	0
24	DF	(England) ENG	Tommy Elphick	37	1	28+1	0	3	1	3	0	2	0
25	FW	(Wales) WAL	Craig Davies	16	0	10+6	0	0	0	0	0	0	0
26	FW	(England) ENG	Calvin Andrew (on loan from Crystal Palace)	9	1	3+6	1	0	0	0	0	0	0
28	MF	(France) FRA	Sébastien Carole	12	0	5+7	0	0	0	0	0	0	0
29	MF	(England) ENG	Kane Wills (on loan to Bognor Regis)	0	0	0	0	0	0	0	0	0	0
30	FW	(England) ENG	Kane Louis	0	0	0	0	0	0	0	0	0	0
31	MF	(England) ENG	Dan Royce	0	0	0	0	0	0	0	0	0	0
32	DF	(England) ENG	Andy Pearson (on loan to Lewes)	0	0	0	0	0	0	0	0	0	0
33	FW	(England) ENG	Sam Gargan (on loan to Eastbourne Borough)	0	0	0	0	0	0	0	0	0	0
34	DF	(England) ENG	Steve Cook (on loan to Havant & Waterlooville)	3	0	0+2	0	1	0	0	0	0	0
35	MF	(England) ENG	Steve Brinkhurst	0	0	0	0	0	0	0	0	0	0
36	GK	(England) ENG	Paul Crichton	0	0	0	0	0	0	0	0	0	0
37	GK	(England) ENG	Josh Pelling	0	0	0	0	0	0	0	0	0	0
?		(England) ENG	Steven Thomson	17	0	17	0	0	0	0	0	0	0
?		(England) ENG	Matthew Richards	23	0	23	0	0	0	0	0	0	0

== Transfers ==
=== Transfers in ===
Player	From	Date	Fee
(Republic of Ireland) Colin Hawkins	Coventry City	29 May 2008	Free
(England) Kevin McLeod	Colchester United	3 June 2008	Free
(England) Adam Virgo	Celtic	30 June 2008	Free
(England) David Livermore	Hull City	3 July 2008	Free
(Wales) Jack Compton	West Brom	30 August 2008	Free
(Trinidad and Tobago) Chris Birchall	Coventry City	5 January 2009	Free
(England) Jason Jarrett	Preston North End	25 January 2009	Free
(France) Sébastien Carole	Darlington	29 January 2009	Free
(Wales) Craig Davies	Oldham Athletic	2 February 2009	Undisclosed fee
(Scotland) Jimmy McNulty	Stockport County	2 February 2009	£150,000

=== Transfers out ===
Player	To	Date	Fee
(Republic of Ireland) Shane McFaul	University College Dublin	15 May 2008	Free
(England) Sam Rents	Crawley Town	23 May 2008	Free
(England) Guy Butters	Havant & Waterlooville	30 May 2008	Free
(Australia) Paul Reid	Adelaide United	29 June 2008	Free
(England) Wes Fogden	Dorchester Town	26 September 2008	Free
(England) Joe Gatting	Sussex County Cricket Club	31 October 2008	Retired to pursue career in Cricket
(Scotland) Steven Thomson	St Mirren	1 January 2009	Free
(England) Scott Chamberlain	Bognor Regis Town	2 January 2009	Free
(Wales) Jack Compton	Havant & Waterlooville	2 January 2009	Free

=== Loans in ===
Player	From	Date From	Date Till
(England) Matt Richards	Ipswich Town	1 August 2008	31 December 2008
(Ghana) Joe Anyinsah	Preston North End	11 September 2008	11 December 2008
(Republic of Ireland) Kevin Thornton	Coventry City	26 September 2008	28 December 2008
(Wales) Robbie Savage	Derby County	1 October 2008	1 November 2008
(England) Bradley Johnson	Leeds United	27 October 2008	3 January 2009
(England) Stuart Fleetwood	Charlton Athletic	30 October 2008	29 January 2009
(England) Calvin Andrew	Crystal Palace	29 January 2009	8 May 2009

=== Loans out ===
Player	To	Date From	Date Till
(England) Sam Gargan	Havant & Waterlooville	8 August 2008	8 September 2008
(England) Joe Gatting	Bognor Regis Town	8 August 2008	8 September 2008
(England) Wes Fogden	Dorchester Town	11 August 2008	26 September 2008
(England) Kane Louis	Burgess Hill Town	23 August 2008	23 October 2008
(England) Kerry Mayo	Lewes	10 September 2008	10 October 2008
(England) Sam Gargan	Lewes	23 September 2008	23 October 2008
(England) Scott Chamberlain	Bognor Regis Town	23 September 2008	23 October 2008
(Spain) Jonny Dixon	Grays Athletic	24 September 2008	24 October 2008
(England) Joel Lynch	Nottingham Forest	26 September 2008	26 December 2008
(England) Dan Royce	Havant & Waterlooville	10 October 2008	10 November 2008
(Wales) Jack Compton	Lewes	10 October 2008	10 November 2008
(England) Adam Hinshelwood	Lewes	30 October 2008	30 November 2008
(England) Sam Gargan	Lewes	5 December 2008	2 January 2009
(England) Jonny Dixon	Eastleigh	9 January 2009	9 February 2009
(England) Kane Wills	Bognor Regis Town	9 January 2009	8 May 2009
(England) Andy Pearson	Lewes	19 January 2009	19 February 2009
(England) Steve Cook	Havant & Waterlooville	19 January 2009	19 February 2009
(England) Sam Gargan	Eastbourne Borough	29 January 2009	2 March 2009
(England) Doug Loft	Dagenham & Redbridge	2 February 2009	8 May 2009

== Kit profile ==
Supplier: Errea
Sponsor(s): Front–IT First
Sponsor: Back–Donatello Restaurant

Home Strip	Away Strip	Third Strip
