= Pendlebury (disambiguation) =

Pendlebury is part of Greater Manchester in England. Pendlebury may also refer to:

== People ==
- Andrew Pendlebury (born 1952), Australian musician, son of L. Scott Pendlebury
- Anne Scott-Pendlebury, Australia actress, daughter of L. Scott Pendlebury
- Gwladys Pendlebury, fictional character in the Jeeves and Wooster novels of P. G. Wodehouse
- Ian Pendlebury (born 1983), English footballer
- John Pendlebury (1904–1941), British archaeologist and soldier
- John Pendlebury (rugby league) (born 1961), English rugby league forward
- Jonathan Pendlebury (born 1983), English rugby union player
- L. Scott Pendlebury (1914–1986), Australian painter and art teacher
- Oliver Pendlebury (born 2002), English footballer
- Richard Pendlebury (1847–1902), British mathematician, musician, bibliophile and mountaineer
- Scott Pendlebury (born 1988), Australian rules footballer

== Places ==
- Pendlebury, former mining town, now a district in Salford, Greater Manchester
  - Pendlebury railway station, railway station in the town of Pendlebury
  - Pendlebury (ward), electoral ward within Pendlebury
- Swinton and Pendlebury, former parish and municipal borough of Lancashire
