= 2002–03 Wigan Athletic F.C. season =

Wigan Athletic
2002–03 season
- Manager: Paul Jewell
- Stadium: JJB Stadium
- Second Division: 1st (promoted)
- FA Cup: Third round
- League Cup: Quarter-finals
- Top goalscorer: League: Andy Liddell (16); All: Nathan Ellington (22)
- Highest home attendance: 12,783 (vs. Oldham Athletic, 21 April 2003)
- Lowest home attendance: 5,358 (vs. Wycombe Wanderers, 7 September 2002)
- Average home league attendance: 7,287

During the 2002–03 English football season, Wigan Athletic F.C. competed in the Football League Second Division.

== Background ==
Despite a disappointing previous season, it was felt that the club still had a strong squad. The Guardian and The Times both predicted that the club would finish 2nd in the league.

== Transfers ==
=== In ===
Player	Position	From	Fee	Date	Notes
Michael Flynn	MF	Barry Town	£15,000	21 June 2002	
Ian Breckin	DF	Chesterfield	Undisclosed	25 June 2002	
Nicky Eaden	DF	Birmingham City	Nominal	20 October 2002	
Richard Edghill	DF	Manchester City	Free	22 October 2002	
Dave Beasant	GK	Bradford City	Free	28 October 2002	
Jimmy Bullard	MF	Peterborough United	£275,000	31 January 2003	

=== Out ===
Player	Position	To	Fee	Date	Notes
Stewart Kerr	GK		Retired	27 September 2002	
Richard Edghill	DF	Sheffield United	Released	22 January 2003	
Dave Beasant	GK	Brighton & Hove Albion	Free	30 January 2003	
Lee Ashcroft	FW	Southport	Released	6 February 2003	
Scott Green	DF	Wrexham	Released	14 February 2003	
Kieran Charnock	DF	Southport	Free	18 March 2003	
Ian Pendlebury	DF	Leigh RMI	Free	19 March 2003	
Paul Santus	MF	Northwich Victoria	Released	30 June 2003	

=== Loans in ===
Player	Pos	To	Date	Duration	Notes
Nicky Eaden	DF	Birmingham City	20 September 2002	One month	

=== Loans out ===
Player	Pos	To	Date	Duration	Notes
Lee Ashcroft	FW	Port Vale	9 October 2002	One month	
Lee Ashcroft	FW	Huddersfield Town	9 December 2002	One month	
Ged Brannan	MF	Dunfermline Athletic	30 January 2003	End of season	

== Pre-season ==
Date	Opponent	Venue	Result	Scorers	Notes
16 July 2002	RBC Roosendaal	A	0–0		
18 July 2002	TOP Oss	A	2–1		
24 July 2002	Morecambe	A	0–0		
25 July 2002	Burscough	A	4–1		
27 July 2002	Shrewsbury Town	A	2–2		
30 July 2002	Walsall	A	2–0		
3 August 2002	Preston North End	H	1–1		

== League ==
Between 2 November and 18 January, the club won a record 11 consecutive league games. Goalkeeper John Filan set another club record during this run of games by keeping eight clean sheets in a row.

The club secured promotion with four games to spare on 15 April when their closest rivals, Crewe Alexandra, dropped points against Bristol City. This was the first time in the club's history that Wigan had been promoted to the second tier of English football. The club went on to win the Second Division, finishing the season with 100 points, 14 clear of runners-up Crewe. This is Wigan's highest-ever points total in a season.

Four Wigan players were named in the PFA Team of the Year.

=== Results ===
Wigan Athletic's score comes first

Legend

Win	Draw	Loss

Second Division match details
Game	Date	Opponent	Venue	Result	Attendance	Scorers	Notes
1	10 August 2002	Cheltenham Town	A	2–0	5,138	Liddell, McCulloch	
2	13 August 2002	Mansfield Town	H	3–2	5,837	Ellington (2), De Vos	
3	17 August 2002	Bristol City	H	2–0	6,548	Green, McCulloch	
4	24 August 2002	Notts County	A	2–0	6,302	Liddell (2)	
5	26 August 2002	Port Vale	H	0–1	6,532		
6	31 August 2002	Colchester United	A	0–1	2,721		
7	7 September 2002	Wycombe Wanderers	H	3–0	5,358	Liddell (2), McCulloch	
8	14 September 2002	Chesterfield	A	0–0	4,124		
9	17 September 2002	Tranmere Rovers	A	2–0	8,153	Ellington (2, 1 pen.)	
10	21 September 2002	Peterborough United	H	2–2	5,797	Liddell (pen.), Ellington	
11	28 September 2002	Barnsley	A	3–1	9,977	Liddell, Jackson, Green	
12	5 October 2002	Cardiff City	H	2–2	8,047	Dinning, Ellington	
13	12 October 2002	Plymouth Argyle	A	3–1	8,746	Dinning (2), Ellington	
14	19 October 2002	Stockport County	H	2–1	7,276	Ellington, Roberts	
15	26 October 2002	Luton Town	A	1–1	7,364	De Vos	
16	29 October 2002	Queens Park Rangers	H	1–1	6,241	Liddell	
17	2 November 2002	Crewe Alexandra	H	2–0	7,086	Liddell (pen.), Foster (o.g.)	
18	9 November 2002	Blackpool	A	2–0	7,676	Dinning, Flynn	
19	23 November 2002	Brentford	A	1–0	5,454	Roberts	
20	30 November 2002	Northampton Town	H	1–0	6,032	Roberts	
21	14 December 2002	Oldham Athletic	A	2–0	8,269	Ellington, De Vos	
22	21 December 2002	Huddersfield Town	H	1–0	6,013	De Vos	
23	26 December 2002	Port Vale	A	1–0	6,395	De Vos	
24	28 December 2002	Swindon Town	H	2–0	6,114	Teale, Ellington	
25	1 January 2003	Notts County	H	3–1	6,009	Dinning, De Vos, Liddell	
26	10 January 2003	Bristol City	A	1–0	13,151	Kennedy	
27	18 January 2003	Colchester United	H	2–1	5,792	De Vos, Liddell (pen.)	
28	25 January 2003	Swindon Town	A	1–2	5,238	McCulloch	
29	28 January 2003	Mansfield Town	A	2–1	5,524	Ellington, Liddell	
30	1 February 2003	Cheltenham Town	H	0–0	6,171		
31	8 February 2003	Blackpool	H	1–1	10,546	Liddell	
32	22 February 2003	Wycombe Wanderers	A	2–0	6,052	McCulloch, Liddell (pen.)	
33	25 February 2003	Crewe Alexandra	A	1–0	8,917	Ellington	
34	1 March 2003	Chesterfield	H	3–1	6,384	Teale, Dinning, Liddell (pen.)	
35	4 March 2003	Tranmere Rovers	H	0–0	9,021		
36	8 March 2003	Peterborough United	A	1–1	4,970	Arber (o.g.)	
37	15 March 2003	Luton Town	H	1–1	7,087	Roberts	
38	18 March 2003	Stockport County	A	1–1	6,719	De Vos	
39	22 March 2003	Queens Park Rangers	A	1–0	14,703	Ellington	
40	29 March 2003	Plymouth Argyle	H	0–1	7,203		
41	4 April 2003	Northampton Town	A	2–0	5,822	Ellington, Liddell (pen.)	
42	12 April 2003	Brentford	H	2–0	7,204	Ellington, McCulloch	
43	19 April 2003	Huddersfield Town	A	0–0	13,769		
44	21 April 2003	Oldham Athletic	H	3–1	12,783	Roberts (2), Bullard	
45	26 April 2003	Cardiff City	A	0–0	14,702		
46	3 May 2003	Barnsley	H	1–0	12,537	Dinning	

=== Final league table ===
Pos	Team	Pld	W	D	L	GF	GA	GD	Pts	Promotion or relegation
1	Wigan Athletic (C, P)	46	29	13	4	68	25	+43	100	Promotion to Football League First Division
2	Crewe Alexandra (P)	46	25	11	10	76	40	+36	86	Promotion to Football League First Division
3	Bristol City	46	24	11	11	79	48	+31	83	Qualification for the Second Division play-offs
4	Queens Park Rangers	46	24	11	11	69	45	+24	83	Qualification for the Second Division play-offs
5	Oldham Athletic	46	22	16	8	68	38	+30	82	Qualification for the Second Division play-offs

Rules for classification: In the Football League goals scored (GF) takes precedence over goal difference (GD).
(C) Champions; (P) Promoted

== Cups ==
=== FA Cup ===
Round	Date	Opponent	Venue	Result	Attendance	Goalscorers	Notes
First	16 November 2002	Hereford United	A	1–0	4,005	Green	
Second	7 December 2002	Luton Town	H	3–0	4,544	Ellington (2), Flynn	
Third	4 January 2003	Stoke City	H	0–3	9,618		

=== League Cup ===
The club reached the quarter-finals of the League Cup for the first time in its history, with upset victories against three Premiership sides (West Bromwich Albion, Manchester City and Fulham) before being knocked out by Blackburn Rovers.

Round	Date	Opponent	Venue	Result	Attendance	Goalscorers	Notes
First	10 September 2002	Northampton Town	A	1–0	2,336	Jarrett	
Second	2 October 2002	West Bromwich Albion	H	3–1	6,558	Ellington (3)	
Third	5 November 2002	Manchester City	H	1–0	15,007	N. Roberts	
Fourth	4 December 2002	Fulham	H	2–1	7,615	Ellington (2)	
Quarter final	17 December 2002	Blackburn Rovers	H	0–2	16,922		

=== Football League Trophy ===
Jewell fielded a weakened team in the First Round of the Football League Trophy, but were still able to win against Notts County. In the next round against Conference side Doncaster Rovers, goalkeeper Dave Beasant became the oldest player to appear for the club at 43 years of age.

Round	Date	Opponent	Venue	Result	Attendance	Goalscorers	Notes
First (Northern)	22 October 2002	Notts County	A	3–2	1,020	Teale (2), Jarrett	
Second (Northern)	11 November 2002	Doncaster Rovers	H	0–1	2,030		

== Squad statistics ==
Squad at end of season

=== Appearances and goals ===
No.	Pos	Nat	Player	Total		Division Two		FA Cup		League Cup		League Trophy	
No.	Pos	Nat	Player	Apps	Goals	Apps	Goals	Apps	Goals	Apps	Goals	Apps	Goals
1	GK	(Australia) AUS	John Filan	55	0	46	0	3	0	5	0	1	0
2	DF	(England) ENG	Paul Mitchell	34	0	13+14	0	1+1	0	1+2	0	2	0
3	DF	(Scotland) SCO	Stephen McMillan	36	0	28+4	0	0	0	4	0	0	0
4	DF	(England) ENG	Matt Jackson	55	1	45	1	3	0	5	0	2	0
5	DF	(Canada) CAN	Jason De Vos	49	8	43	8	1	0	5	0	0	0
6	DF	(England) ENG	Ian Breckin	12	0	7+2	0	2	0	0	0	1	0
7	MF	(Scotland) SCO	Andy Liddell	41	16	32+5	16	1	0	2	0	1	0
8	FW	(Wales) WAL	Neil Roberts	46	7	25+12	6	3	0	4+1	1	1	0
9	FW	(England) ENG	Nathan Ellington	51	22	41+1	15	2+1	2	5	5	0+1	0
10	FW	(Scotland) SCO	Lee McCulloch	41	6	33+5	6	0+1	0	2	0	0	0
11	MF	(Northern Ireland) NIR	Peter Kennedy	30	1	21+1	1	3	0	3	0	2	0
12	MF	(Wales) WAL	Michael Flynn	24	2	3+14	1	0+2	1	0+3	0	2	0
15	FW	(England) ENG	David Moore	0	0	0	0	0	0	0	0	0	0
16	MF	(England) ENG	Tony Dinning	44	7	36+2	7	2	0	4	0	0	0
17	MF	(England) ENG	Ged Brannan	7	0	6	0	0	0	0	0	1	0
18	MF	(England) ENG	Jason Jarrett	45	2	25+10	0	3	0	5	1	1+1	1
19	DF	(England) ENG	Nicky Eaden	45	0	37	0	3	0	4	0	1	0
20	MF	(Scotland) SCO	Gary Teale	46	4	28+10	2	1+1	0	2+2	0	2	2
21	MF	(England) ENG	Jimmy Bullard	17	1	17	1	0	0	0	0	0	0
25	DF	(England) ENG	Chris Lynch	0	0	0	0	0	0	0	0	0	0
26	DF	(England) ENG	Leighton Baines	12	0	6	0	2	0	1+1	0	1+1	0
27	FW	(England) ENG	Greg Traynor	0	0	0	0	0	0	0	0	0	0
30	MF	(England) ENG	Paul Santus	0	0	0	0	0	0	0	0	0	0
33	GK	(England) ENG	Ryan Yeomans	0	0	0	0	0	0	0	0	0	0
Players who appeared for Wigan and left during the season:
13	GK	(Scotland) SCO	Stewart Kerr	0	0	0	0	0	0	0	0	0	0
13	GK	(England) ENG	Dave Beasant	1	0	0	0	0	0	0	0	1	0
14	DF	(England) ENG	Scott Green	26	3	14+3	2	3	1	3+1	0	2	0
15	FW	(England) ENG	Lee Ashcroft	1	0	0	0	0	0	0+1	0	0	0
23	DF	(England) ENG	Richard Edghill	1	0	0	0	0	0	0	0	1	0
28	DF	(England) ENG	Kieran Charnock	0	0	0	0	0	0	0	0	0	0
29	DF	(England) ENG	Ian Pendlebury	0	0	0	0	0	0	0	0	0	0
