= Sam Gargan =

Sam Gargan may refer to:

- Sam Gargan (footballer)
- Sam Gargan (politician)
