= Jonny Dixon =

English footballer and film producer (born 1984)

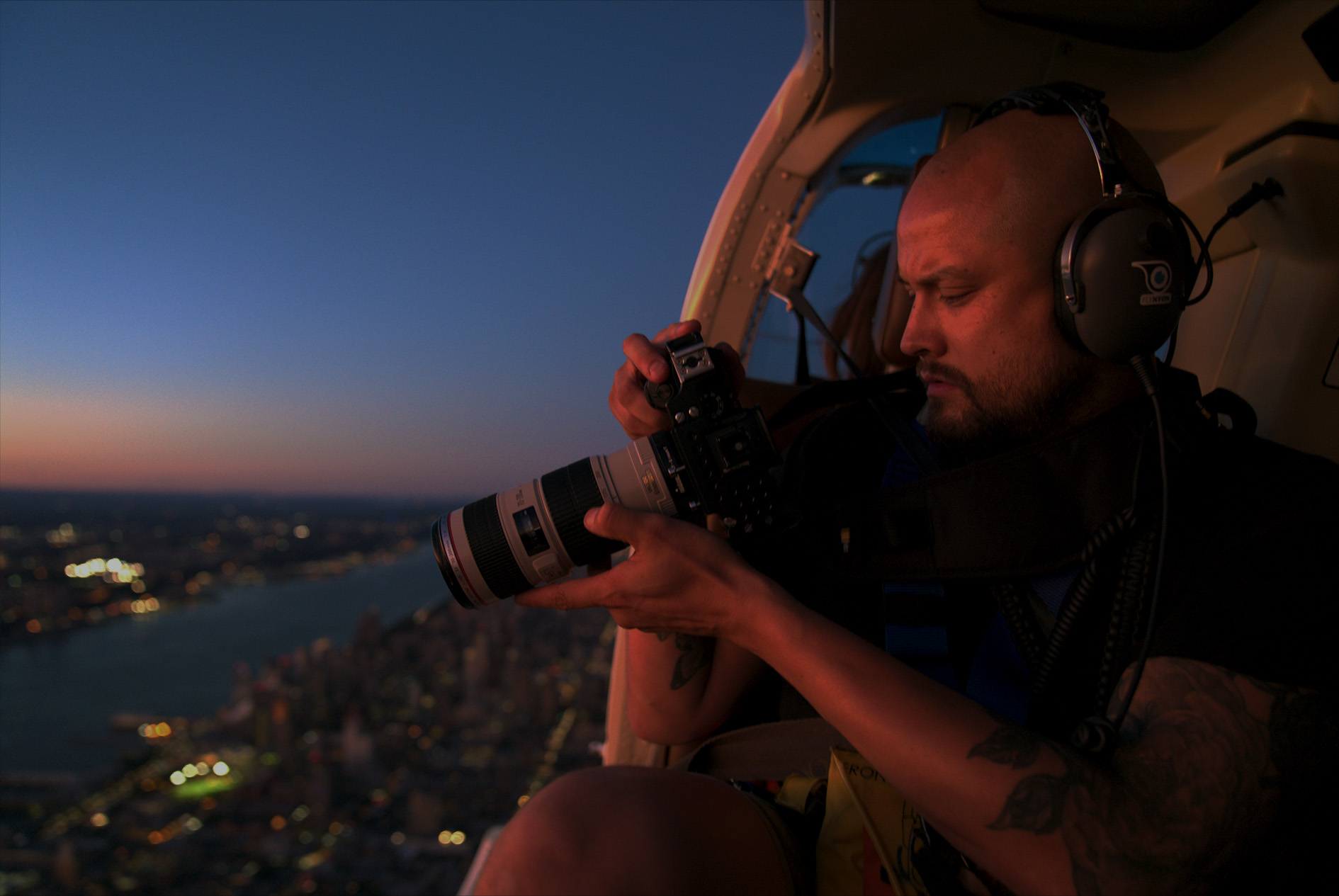
- Dixon films aerials over New York city

Personal information
- Full name: Jonathan James Dixon
- Date of birth: 16 January 1984 (age 42)
- Place of birth: Murcia, Spain
- Height: 5 ft 10 in (1.78 m)
- Position: Forward

Youth career
- –2001: Wycombe Wanderers

Senior career*
| Years | Team | Apps | (Gls) |
| 2001–2007 | Wycombe Wanderers | 73 | (7) |
| 2003–2004 | → Crawley Town (loan) | | |
| 2004–2005 | → Aldershot Town (loan) | 10 | (7) |
| 2006 | → Aldershot Town (loan) | 10 | (4) |
| 2007–2008 | Aldershot Town | 43 | (15) |
| 2008–2009 | Brighton & Hove Albion | 5 | (0) |
| 2008 | → Grays Athletic (loan) | 4 | (0) |
| 2008 | → Eastleigh (loan) | | |
| 2009 | → Eastleigh (loan) | | |
| Total | | 145 | (33) |
- * Club domestic league appearances and goals

Jonathan James Dixon (born 16 January 1984) is a film and television producer and director, and a former professional footballer. He played as a striker.

== Early life ==
Jonathan James Dixon was born on 16 January 1984 in Murcia, Spain.

== Football career ==
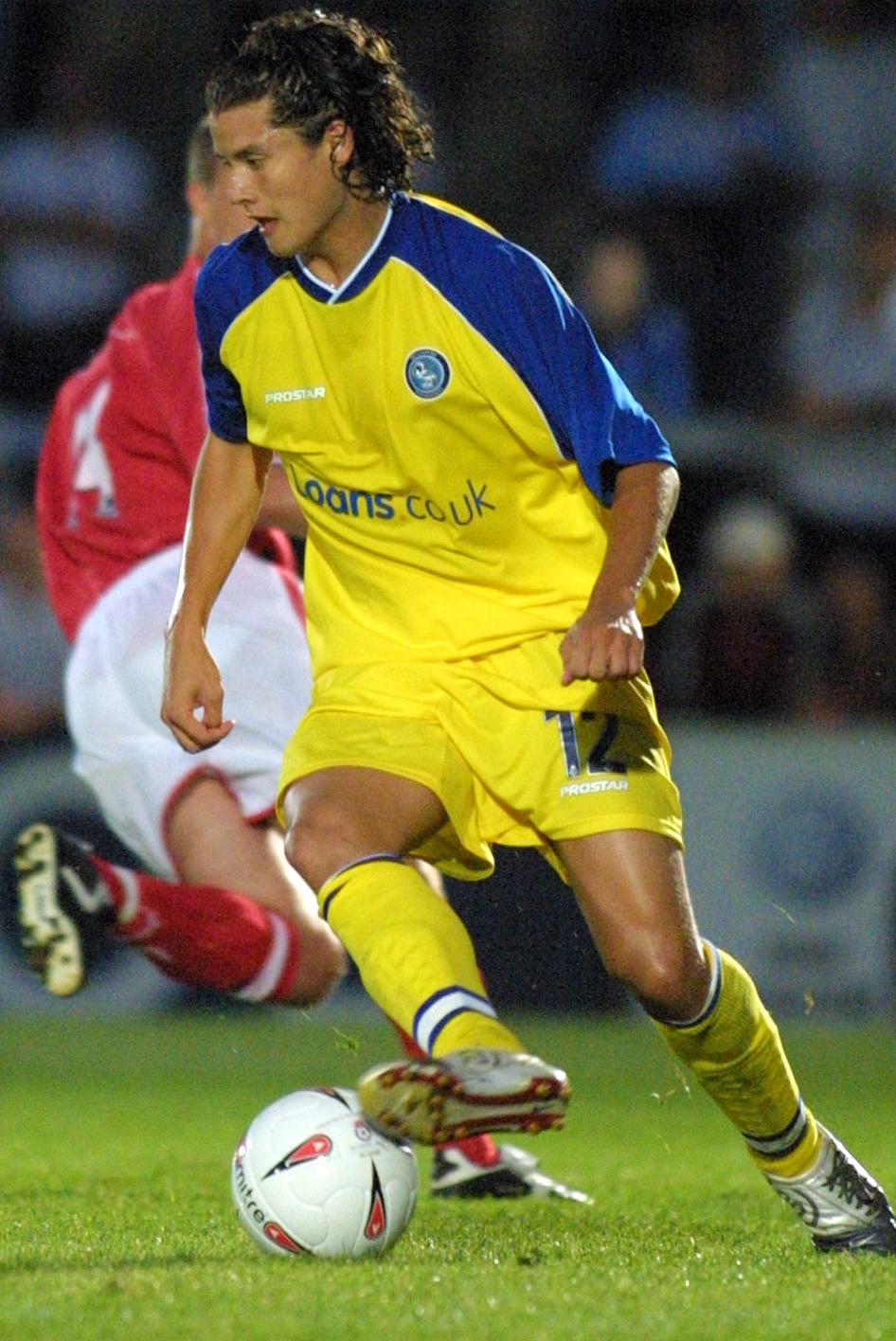
Dixon playing for Wycombe Wanderers

Dixon began his career as a trainee with Wycombe Wanderers, turning professional in August 2001. Following regular reserve team appearances during 2001–02, Dixon was given a squad number by manager Lawrie Sanchez at the beginning of season 2002–03. He made his debut, as a late substitute for Stuart Roberts against Northampton Town on 13 August 2002. Despite suffering a knee injury, he still managed to score five goals in seven starts for the Blues, earning himself a contract through to 2005.

Due to a lack of opportunities to feature in the first team at Wycombe during the 2003–04 season, he joined Southern Football League Premier Division champions Crawley Town on loan in December 2003.

A similar story during the 2004–05 season saw Dixon go on loan to Aldershot Town in November 2004, where he scored nine goals in 12 appearances. Due to the success of this loan period, Dixon returned to Wycombe and signed a one-year contract extension in June 2005 before rejoining the Shots on loan until the end of season in January 2006. It was thought that in June 2006 Dixon would sign permanently for Aldershot but following the arrival of Paul Lambert as manager he signed a further one-year contract with Wycombe. He was used mainly as a substitute by Lambert and played his final game for Wycombe in the 1–1 draw with Premier League champions Chelsea in the League Cup semi-final on 10 January 2007, replacing Tommy Mooney as a late substitute.

The day after the Chelsea game on 11 January 2007, he signed for Aldershot for a fee of £6,000. In all competitions, Dixon made 24 appearances (three as a substitute) in the remainder of the 2006–07 season scoring eight goals and in the 2007–08 season Dixon made 26 appearances (four as a substitute), scoring 11 goals.

On 30 January 2008, he was signed by Brighton & Hove Albion for a fee of £55,000. He was almost immediately "ruled out for four to six weeks by physio Malcolm Stuart after turning his ankle" during a training accident. Dixon made his Brighton debut coming on as a late substitute during the 1–1 draw against Leyton Orient at the Withdean on 1 March 2008.

He then joined Conference South side Eastleigh on loan, initially for one-month on 9 January 2009.

Dixon returned to Brighton after the conclusion of his initial loan spell at the Silverlake Stadium and was named as a substitute during the Football League Trophy Southern Final penalty-shoot out defeat to Luton Town. Dixon then re-joined Conference South side Eastleigh on loan, initially for a month the following day.

On 3 July 2009, Dixon retired from football, and had his remaining contract at Brighton terminated by mutual consent. He cited the reasons were to concentrate on his music management business.

== Career after football ==
Dixon went on to become a television and film producer and director. His credits include Come Dine with Me, Jodie Marsh on Mail Order Brides, Sun, Sex and Suspicious Parents, Don't Tell the Bride and The Valleys.

== Personal life ==
Dixon has previously dated Australian model, actress and ARIA nominated singer Holly Valance.

== Honours ==
Aldershot Town

- Conference Premier: 2007–08
