= Jason Jarrett (footballer) =

English footballer

Personal information
- Full name: Jason Lee Jarrett
- Date of birth: 14 September 1979 (age 47)
- Place of birth: Bury, England
- Height: 6 ft 0 in (1.83 m)
- Position: Midfielder

Team information
- Current team: Bury Women (Manager)

Youth career
- Blackpool

Senior career*
Years	Team	Apps	(Gls)
1998–1999	Blackpool	2	(0)
1999–2000	Wrexham	1	(0)
2000–2002	Bury	62	(4)
2002–2005	Wigan Athletic	95	(1)
2005	→ Stoke City (loan)	2	(0)
2005–2006	Norwich City	11	(0)
2005–2006	→ Plymouth Argyle (loan)	7	(0)
2006	→ Preston North End (loan)	10	(1)
2006–2009	Preston North End	8	(0)
2006	→ Hull City (loan)	3	(0)
2007	→ Leicester City (loan)	13	(0)
2007–2008	→ Queens Park Rangers (loan)	2	(0)
2008	→ Oldham Athletic (loan)	15	(3)
2009	Brighton & Hove Albion	13	(0)
2009	Port Vale	9	(0)
2010–2011	Oldham Athletic	8	(0)
2012–2013	FC Halifax Town	14	(0)
2013	Airbus UK Broughton	10	(1)
2013–2014	Chester	29	(0)
2014–2015	Salford City	27	(4)
Total		341	(14)

Managerial career
- 2023–: Bury Women
- * Club domestic league appearances and goals

Jason Lee Jarrett (born 14 September 1979) is an English football manager and former player who is the head coach of Bury Women. He made 296 appearances as a midfielder in league and cup competitions in a 13-year career in the English Football League.

Jarrett started his career with Blackpool in 1998; the next year, he moved on to Wrexham. He spent 2000 to 2002 with Bury before signing with Wigan Athletic. In 2005, he joined Norwich City, moving on to Preston North End the next year. He spent the first part of 2009 with Brighton & Hove Albion after negotiating a release from his contract at Preston; he spent the latter half of 2009 signed with Port Vale. In summer 2010, he signed with Oldham Athletic. He joined FC Halifax Town in July 2012 and moved on to Chester via Airbus UK Broughton in 2013. He moved on to Salford City in 2014 and helped the club to the Northern Premier League Division One North title in 2014–15. He took charge of Bury Women in 2023.

== Playing career ==
Jarrett started his career as an apprentice with Blackpool. He made his first-team debut in an FA Cup clash with Wigan Athletic on 14 November 1998 at Springfield Park, replacing Barry Shuttleworth late into a 4–3 defeat. He got his first start on 8 December, in a Football League Trophy 2–0 home defeat by Stoke City. He went on to play two league games that season before joining Wrexham at the end of the season. On 9 October 1999, he played in a 5–1 defeat at Gillingham's Priestfield Stadium. That was his only appearance for the "Dragons".

He was with Bury for the 2000–01 season. He scored his first goal at Vetch Field on 30 September 2000, scoring the second of a 2–0 win over Swansea City. In total, he made 28 appearances that season. He established himself in the first team in 2001–02, playing over forty games. Bury were relegated into the Third Division at the end of the season. Still, Jarrett avoided this fate, having been sold to Wigan Athletic for £75,000 in March 2002. He played 45 games in 2002–03, as Wigan were promoted from the Second Division as champions, with a massive 100 points. Coping well with First Division football, he made over forty appearances in 2003–04. His team finished two points outside the play-off places.

After recovering from a broken leg, he spent January 2005 with Stoke City. He played three games for the "Potters", including their 2–1 FA Cup defeat to Arsenal. manager Tony Pulis was eager to have him back at the Britannia Stadium, but nothing came of the talk. The "Latics" finished second in 2004–05 and were promoted to the Premier League, though Jarrett only made 14 appearances. Leaving the JJB Stadium after his contract was up, he rejected a new three-year deal with the Premier League club. Instead, he chose to look for first-team football elsewhere, signing for Nigel Worthington's Norwich City in June 2005. He had already played under Worthington at Blackpool.

He was out of favour for the "Canaries" in 2005–06, playing just eleven league games. He joined Plymouth Argyle on a six-week loan in November 2005, managed by former Stoke boss Tony Pulis. He played seven games for the Devon-based club before returning to Norwich to help the club during an injury crisis. In March 2006, he joined Preston North End on loan until the end of the season, with a view to a permanent transfer afterwards. Norwich were paid £30,000 for the loan deal and the permanent transfer would go through for an undisclosed sum.

The 2006–07 season saw him play for three different clubs. Losing his place in the Preston side in September, he joined Hull City on loan in November 2006, to provide midfield cover for the injury-stricken club. In February 2007, he joined Leicester City on an initial one-month loan period. He made his debut in Leicester's 2–0 victory at Portman Road against Ipswich Town. On 23 February 2007, the loan was extended until the end of the season. He finished with 13 appearances for the "Foxes" and would have joined the club permanently had manager Rob Kelly not lost his job. Back at Carrow Road, Jarrett was transfer listed at the end of the season. In October 2007 he was sent on loan to Queens Park Rangers for three months, but only played two games, returning to Deepdale after just a few weeks. He joined League One Oldham Athletic on an end-of-season loan in January 2008. He scored three times in 15 games for the "Latics", including two in a 4–1 victory against Roses derby rivals Huddersfield Town, before also missing a penalty that would have completed a first career hat-trick.

After applying himself well in pre-season, he made three appearances for Preston in October 2008, but was told by manager Alan Irvine that he would be restricted to appearance from the bench at Deepdale. During his time at Preston he suffered with depression. In January 2009, Jarrett left Preston after negotiating an early release to his contract, and joined League One side Brighton & Hove Albion, signing a contract until the end of the 2008–09 season. Adams lost his job not long afterwards, and new manager Russell Slade brought in his own man in Gary Dicker from Stockport County. It was announced on 12 May 2009, that Jarrett would be leaving Brighton after the expiration of his contract at the end of June 2009.

In September 2009, he joined up with Micky Adams again, this time at League Two Port Vale on a trial basis. He was signed up on a three-month deal before the month was up, in an attempt to "kick-start his career". His first task was to regain the fitness necessary for regular football. However, he was not offered a new contract at the end of the year, having played just 13 games, due to illness and injury. Adams admitted "the fans didn't see the best of him".

In July 2010 he signed a six-month contract with Oldham Athletic. Manager Paul Dickov spoke of how versatile the player was, and that he was planning to play the midfielder in defence, in the belief he can bring a lot of experience to a young side. He was released on 13 January 2011 after his short-term contract was completed, having made ten appearances. He spent July 2011 on trial at Rochdale.

He signed with Conference North club FC Halifax Town in July 2012. He moved on to Airbus in January 2013, and played ten Welsh Premier League games. He signed with Chester in May 2013. He made 32 appearances for the "Seals" as they were relegated out of the Conference Premier in 2013–14.

Jarrett signed with Salford City in June 2014. He made his club debut in the opening league match of the season on 16 August as Salford beat Scarborough 4–1. The "Ammies" won the Northern Premier League Division One North title in 2014–15.

== Style of play ==
Brighton manager Micky Adams described Jarrett as "an energetic box-to-box midfielder who can operate in either an attacking or defensive role anywhere across the middle".

== Later career ==
Jarrett took an FA refereeing course in 2013 at Lancashire FA; he continued playing semi-professional football while gaining experience refereeing on Sunday mornings in the Lancashire Sunday Football League. He decided to retire from playing football and concentrate on his refereeing career. He brought his refereeing career to an end after realising his vast number of former clubs would make a referee career in the Football League very limited. He set up a coaching academy named ProBall Sport. On 23 June 2023, he was appointed as caretaker manager of Bury Women. He was given the role permanently on 13 July. Jarrett still plays football as of 2026 for Radcliffe Old Boys in the Cheshire Veterans Football League.

== Career statistics ==
Appearances and goals by club, season and competition
Season	Club	League			National cup (Note: Includes FA Cup, Welsh Cup)		League cup (Note: Includes Football League Cup, Welsh League Cup)		Other		Total	
Season	Club	Division	Apps	Goals	Apps	Goals	Apps	Goals	Apps	Goals	Apps	Goals
Blackpool	1998–99	Second Division	2	0	1	0	0	0	1 (Note: Appearance(s) in Football League Trophy)	0	4	0
Wrexham	1999–2000	Second Division	1	0	0	0	0	0	3 (Note: Appearance(s) in FAW Premier Cup)	0	4	0
Bury	2000–01	Second Division	25	2	2	0	0	0	2	1	29	3
Bury	2001–02	Second Division	37	2	2	0	1	0	1	0	41	2
Bury	Total		62	4	4	0	1	0	3	1	70	5
Wigan Athletic	2001–02	Second Division	5	0	—		—		0	0	5	0
Wigan Athletic	2002–03	Second Division	35	0	3	0	5	1	2	1	45	2
Wigan Athletic	2003–04	First Division	41	1	0	0	2	1	—		43	2
Wigan Athletic	2004–05	Championship	14	0	—		0	0	—		14	0
Wigan Athletic	Total		95	1	3	0	7	2	2	1	107	4
Stoke City (loan)	2004–05	Championship	2	0	1	0	—		—		3	0
Norwich City	2005–06	Championship	11	0	1	0	3	0	—		15	0
Plymouth Argyle (loan)	2005–06	Championship	7	0	—		—		—		7	0
Preston North End (loan)	2005–06	Championship	10	1	—		—		1 (Note: Appearance(s) in Championship play-offs)	0	11	1
Preston North End	2006–07	Championship	5	0	0	0	1	0	—		6	0
Preston North End	2007–08	Championship	0	0	0	0	0	0	0	0	0	0
Preston North End	2008–09	Championship	3	0	0	0	0	0	0	0	3	0
Preston North End	Total		18	1	0	0	1	0	1	0	20	1
Hull City (loan)	2006–07	Championship	3	0	0	0	—		—		3	0
Leicester City (loan)	2006–07	Championship	13	0	—		—		—		13	0
Queens Park Rangers (loan)	2007–08	Championship	2	0	0	0	0	0	—		2	0
Oldham Athletic (loan)	2007–08	League One	15	3	—		—		—		15	3
Brighton & Hove Albion	2008–09	League One	13	0	—		—		1	0	14	0
Port Vale	2009–10	League Two	9	0	3	0	0	0	1	0	13	0
Oldham Athletic	2010–11	League One	8	0	1	0	1	0	0	0	10	0
FC Halifax Town	2012–13	Conference North	14	0	0	0	—		2 (Note: Appearance(s) in FA Trophy)	0	16	0
Airbus UK Broughton	2012–13	Welsh Premier League	10	1	1	0	0	0	0	0	11	1
Chester	2013–14	Conference National	29	0	1	0	—		2 (Note: One appearance in FA Trophy and one appearance in Cheshire Senior Cup)	0	32	0
Salford City	2014–15	NPL Division One North	27	4	0	0	—		1	0	28	4
Career total			341	14	16	0	13	2	17	2	387	18

== Honours ==
Wigan Athletic

- Football League Second Division: 2002–03
- Football League Championship second-place promotion: 2004–05

Salford City

- Northern Premier League Division One North: 2014–15
