= Ian Westlake =

English footballer

Personal information
- Full name: Ian John Westlake
- Date of birth: 10 November 1983 (age 42)
- Place of birth: Clacton-on-Sea, England
- Height: 5 ft 8 in (1.73 m)
- Position: Midfielder

Youth career
- 1999–2002: Ipswich Town

Senior career*
| Years | Team | Apps | (Gls) |
| 2002–2006 | Ipswich Town | 113 | (16) |
| 2006–2009 | Leeds United | 47 | (1) |
| 2008 | → Brighton & Hove Albion (loan) | 11 | (2) |
| 2008–2009 | → Cheltenham Town (loan) | 10 | (1) |
| 2009 | Cheltenham Town | 12 | (1) |
| 2009 | → Oldham Athletic (loan) | 5 | (0) |
| 2009–2011 | Wycombe Wanderers | 9 | (0) |
| 2011 | Montreal Impact | 13 | (2) |
| 2013–2015 | Needham Market | 77 | (15) |
| Total | | 297 | (38) |
- * Club domestic league appearances and goals

Ian John Westlake (born 10 November 1983) is an English former professional footballer who played as a midfielder for Ipswich Town, Leeds United, Brighton & Hove Albion, Cheltenham Town, Oldham Athletic, Wycombe Wanderers, Montreal Impact and Needham Market.

== Playing career ==
=== Ipswich Town ===
Born in Clacton-on-Sea, Westlake progressed through the youth ranks at Ipswich Town, at the club's reserves and academy. At one point, he helped the under-17 team to the league title. Westlake then signed his professional forms with the club during the summer of 2002. Westlake reflected: "I might never have played professional football had it not been for relegation. Administration meant the club were forced to sell players and that opened the door for people like myself, Darren Bent and Darren Ambrose. It gave us our chance and, as odd as it sounds, I personally feel I owe my career to relegation."

Westlake made his debut for Ipswich Town, coming on as a substitute in a 1–0 home defeat to Gillingham on 26 October 2002. Having spent months at the club's reserves, he made his return to the first team, coming on as a 72nd-minute substitute, in a 1–0 win against Sheffield Wednesday on 15 March 2003. Westlake made a further three appearances for Ipswich Town during the 2002–03 season.

At the start of the 2003–04 season, Westlake made his first appearance of the season, coming on as a second-half substitute, in a 1–1 draw against Coventry City on 23 August 2003. Seven days later on 30 August 2003, he made his first start for Ipswich Town, as they lost 2–1 against West Ham United. Westlake then scored his first goal for the side during the 3–4 home defeat to Gillingham on 1 November 2003. Three weeks later on 22 November 2003, Westlake scored his second goal for the club, in a 3–0 win against Sheffield United. Initially, his playing time mostly comes from the substitute bench but soon make number of starts as the season progressed. On 31 January 2004, he scored his third goal of the season, in a 1–1 draw against Coventry City. Westlake scored two more goals in February, coming against Bradford City and Preston North End. His seventh goal of the season came on 30 April 2004 against Sheffield United, drawing 1–1. Westlake played in both legs of the Division One Play–Offs against West Ham United, as Ipswich Town lost 2–1 on aggregate. At the end of the 2003–04 season, he made a further 43 appearances for the club and also scored 7 goals, For his performance, Westlake was awarded Ipswich Town Player of the Year.

In August 2004, Westlake was called up to the England Under-21 national team. Amid to the international call up, he continued to establish himself in the starting eleven, playing in the midfield position at the start of the 2004–05 season, though his performance failed to recapture the same levels as he did with the previous season. In his 50th appearance for Ipswich Town against Derby County, Westlake set up the club's first goal of the game, in a 3–2 loss. In a follow–up match against Cardiff City, he scored his first goal of the season, in a 3–1 win and scored again four days later on 25 August 2004, in a 2–0 win against Brentford in the second round of the League Cup. Westlake scored four more goals by the end of the year. His performance led Manager Joe Royle saw in a potential in him, saying he could one day captain the club. Westlake then signed a contract with Ipswich Town, keeping him until 2008. Since the start of the 2004–05 season, Westlake started in every match until he missed one match, due to suspension. After serving a one match suspension, Westlake returned to the starting line–up against Reading on 21 January 2005, as the club drew 1–1. He later scored two more goals for Ipswich Town against Nottingham Forest and Rotherham United, adding his tally to eight goals this season. Westlake set up the club's first two goals in the match, winning 5–1 against Crewe Alexandra on 30 April 2005. He, once again, played in both legs of the Championship Play–Offs against West Ham United, as Ipswich Town lost 4–2 on aggregate. Despite suffering injuries later in the 2004–05 season, Westlake went on to make fifty appearances and scoring eight times in all competitions.

At the start of the 2005–06 season, Westlake started in the first seven matches of the season, playing in the midfield position and scored his first goal of the season, in a 2–1 win against Sheffield Wednesday on 20 August 2005. This lasted until Westlake suffered an ankle injury that kept him out for six weeks, eventually sidelined for two months. He didn't make his return to the first team until on 5 November 2005, coming on as a 76th-minute substitute, in a 3–1 win against Plymouth Argyle. After making two more appearances since returning from injury, Westlake suffered ankle injury once again and was out for a week. He didn't make a return to the first team until on 10 December 2005 against Queens Park Rangers, coming on as a second-half substitute, in a 2–2 draw. Westlake then scored his second goal of the season, in a 1–0 win against Luton Town on 31 December 2005. Since returning from injury, he regained his first team place for Ipswich Town, playing in the midfield position. This lasted until Westlake suffered injuries on two occasions towards the end of the 2005–06 season. At the end of the 2005–06 season, he made twenty–eight appearances and scoring two times in all competitions.

By the time Westlake departed Ipswich Town for Leeds United, he made a total of 125 appearances for the club, scoring 17 goals.

=== Leeds United ===
On 4 August 2006, Westlake transferred to Leeds United for a fee of £400,000 plus the transfer of former Brighton left-back Daniel Harding to Ipswich in a part-exchange deal.

Westlake made his debut on 5 August 2006, coming on as a substitute during the 1–0 home victory over Norwich City. Since making his debut for the club, he became involved in the first team. However, Westlake suffered a groin injury that kept him out for the rest of the season. In total, Westlake made 29 appearances for Leeds during the 2006–07 season, in which the Yorkshire club were relegated from the Championship.

During the 2007–08 season, Westlake made 23 appearances for Leeds and scored his only league goal for the club when netting the last-minute winning goal in a 1–0 away win at Oldham Athletic on 2 October 2007. He had earlier scored his first goal for Leeds in a 1–0 win at Macclesfield in the League Cup on 14 August 2007. However, Westlake's first team opportunities soon became limited, due to competitions and his own injury concern.

==== Brighton & Hove Albion (loan) ====
On 3 March 2008, it was revealed that Westlake had agreed an initial one-month loan deal at League One play-off rivals Brighton & Hove Albion.

Westlake made his Brighton & Hove Albion debut, starting the whole game, in a 4–2 win against Gillingham on 4 March 2008. He then started in the next five matches before suffering a calf injury during a match against Swindon Town on 22 March 2008 and was substituted in the 83rd minute as a result. While on the sidelines, it was announced on 3 April 2008 that Westlake, Leeds United and Brighton & Hove Albion agreed that the player would remain on loan at the Withdean for the remainder of the 2007–08 season. After missing two matches from a calf injury, he made his return to the first team, starting a match against Port Vale on 5 April 2008 and played 63 minutes before being substituted, in a 3–2 loss. Seven days later on 12 April 2008, Westlake scored his first goal for the club, in a 2–1 win against Luton Town. His second goal for the club then came on 26 April 2008, in a 2–0 win against Bristol Rovers. In total, he made 11 appearances for Brighton, scoring two goals. Following this, Westlake returned to his parent club.

=== Cheltenham Town ===
On 24 October 2008, Westlake joined League One side Cheltenham Town on an initial three-month loan deal. It came after when he previously went on a trial with the club.

Westlake made his debut the following day during the 3–1 away defeat to MK Dons. During his loan spell at Cheltenham, Westlake played 14 games and scored 1 goal during the 2–1 away victory at Leyton Orient. On 24 January 2009, Westlake had his contract terminated at Leeds United by mutual consent. Later that day, Westlake signed a contract with Cheltenham Town for the remainder of the 2008–09 season. Westlake also scored on the day of his permanent debut for Cheltenham during the 2–2 home draw with Brighton & Hove Albion.

==== Oldham Athletic (loan) ====
With Cheltenham Town suffering from financial difficulties, Westlake joined League One side Oldham Athletic on loan for the remainder of the 2008–09 season on 19 March 2009. Westlake made his debut for Oldham on 25 March 2009, during a 2–0 home defeat to Tranmere Rovers. In total, Westlake made 5 appearances for the club.

=== Wycombe Wanderers ===
On 15 July 2009, Westlake signed a two-year contract with recently promoted League One side Wycombe Wanderers.

After missing the opening game of the season due to a hamstring injury, he made his debut for the club, starting a match and played 62 minutes before being substituted, in a 1–0 loss against Leeds United on 15 August 2009. Westlake then set up the club's first goal of the game, as Wycombe Wanderers lost 3–2 against Gillingham on 10 October 2009. However, he found himself out of the first team, due to being placed on the substitute bench. Westlake also faced his own injury concern after suffering from ankle injury. Despite this, he went on to make nine appearances in all competitions.

However in the 2010–11 season, Westlake's first team opportunities at the club and made no appearances for Wycombe Wanderers. He was released from his contract on 18 March 2011 and the following week joined Colchester United on trial.

=== Montreal Impact ===
Westlake joined the Montreal Impact on trial starting 5 July 2011. He formally signed with the North American Soccer League team on 15 July 2011, his contract expiring after the 2011 season.

Westlake made his Montreal Impact debut, starting the whole game, in a 2–2 draw against Atlanta Silverbacks on 17 July 2011. He then scored two goals in two matches between 7 August 2011 and 11 August 2011 against Minnesota United and Tampa Bay Rowdies. Westlake quickly became a fixture in the Impact's starting line-up scoring two goals in 13 games. On 5 December 2011, it was announced that Westlake re-signed to continue with the Impact in 2012, the team's first year in Major League Soccer, however Westlake was waived by Montreal on 27 February 2012, despite appearing for the club during their pre-season.

=== Needham Market ===
After being released by Montreal Impact following the introduction of a "six foreign players" rule, Westlake returned to Suffolk before signing for Needham Market eighteen months later in June 2013.

Westlake made his Needham Market debut, starting the match and scoring his first goal from a free kick, in a 3–0 win against Romford. He then became a first team regular for the side, and continued to produce his goal scoring form. Following his performance against AFC Sudbury in the Fourth Qualifying Round of FA Cup, in which he scored, Westlake was praised by Manager Mark Morsley, saying: "The likes of Kemal Izzet and Ian Westlake are massive for us and I am proud of them." However, he suffered a knee injury that kept him out for the rest of the 2013–14 season.

In the 2014–15 season, Westlake returned from injury and continued a first team regular for the side, as well, as producing his goal scoring form. This lasted until he suffered a hamstring injury that kept him out briefly and resume his place in the first team. Westlake helped Needham Market win the Ryman Division One North title following a 5-0 victory over Chatham Town. At the end of the 2014–15 season, he announced his retirement from professional football.

== Career statistics ==
Appearances and goals by club, season and competition
| Club | Season | League | | | FA Cup | | League Cup | | Other | | Total | |
| Club | Season | Division | Apps | Goals | Apps | Goals | Apps | Goals | Apps | Goals | Apps | Goals |
|---|---|---|---|---|---|---|---|---|---|---|---|---|
| Ipswich Town | 2002–03 | First Division | 3 | 0 | 0 | 0 | 1 | 0 | — | | 4 | 0 |
| Ipswich Town | 2003–04 | First Division | 39 | 7 | 1 | 0 | 1 | 0 | 2 (Note: Appearances in First Division play-offs) | 0 | 43 | 7 |
| Ipswich Town | 2004–05 | Championship | 45 | 7 | 1 | 0 | 2 | 1 | 2 (Note: Appearances in Championship play-offs) | 0 | 50 | 8 |
| Ipswich Town | 2005–06 | Championship | 26 | 2 | 1 | 0 | 1 | 0 | — | | 28 | 2 |
| Ipswich Town | Total | | 113 | 16 | 3 | 0 | 5 | 1 | 4 | 0 | 125 | 17 |
| Leeds United | 2006–07 | Championship | 27 | 0 | 0 | 0 | 2 | 0 | — | | 29 | 0 |
| Leeds United | 2007–08 | League One | 20 | 1 | 1 | 0 | 1 | 1 | 1 (Note: Appearance in Football League Trophy) | 0 | 34 | 2 |
| Leeds United | 2008–09 | League One | 0 | 0 | 0 | 0 | 0 | 0 | 0 | 0 | 0 | 0 |
| Leeds United | Total | | 47 | 1 | 1 | 0 | 3 | 1 | 1 | 0 | 52 | 2 |
| Brighton & Hove Albion (loan) | 2007–08 | League One | 11 | 2 | 0 | 0 | 0 | 0 | 0 | 0 | 11 | 2 |
| Cheltenham Town | 2008–09 | League One | 22 | 2 | 4 | 0 | 0 | 0 | 0 | 0 | 26 | 2 |
| Oldham Athletic (loan) | 2008–09 | League One | 5 | 0 | 0 | 0 | 0 | 0 | 0 | 0 | 5 | 0 |
| Wycombe Wanderers | 2009–10 | League One | 9 | 0 | 0 | 0 | 0 | 0 | 1 | 0 | 10 | 0 |
| Wycombe Wanderers | 2010–11 | League Two | 0 | 0 | 0 | 0 | 0 | 0 | 0 | 0 | 0 | 0 |
| Wycombe Wanderers | Total | | 9 | 0 | 0 | 0 | 0 | 0 | 1 | 0 | 10 | 0 |
| Montreal Impact | 2011 | NASL | 13 | 2 | 0 | 0 | 0 | 0 | 0 | 0 | 13 | 2 |
| Career total | | | 220 | 23 | 8 | 0 | 8 | 2 | 6 | 0 | 242 | 25 |

== Personal life ==
Westlake is married to his wife, Clair, and together, they have two daughters. He continued to resided in Ipswich, even after announcing his retirement from professional football. Westlake previously resided in Canada but following his release by Montreal Impact, his family moved back to Ipswich. Since then, Westlake opened up a lettings company and project manage new builds across Ipswich.

Westlake once represented England at water polo. Growing up, he was an Ipswich Town supporter.

== Honours ==
Individual

- Ipswich Town Player of the Year: 2003–04
