= 2003–04 Wigan Athletic F.C. season =

Wigan Athletic
2003–04 season
- Chairman: Dave Whelan
- Manager: Paul Jewell
- Stadium: JJB Stadium
- First Division: 7th
- FA Cup: Third round
- League Cup: Third round
- Top goalscorer: Nathan Ellington (18)
- Average home league attendance: 9,505

During the 2003–04 English football season, Wigan Athletic competed in the Football League First Division.

== Season summary ==
Wigan were playing in Division One for the first time in their history, and after losing their first game many tipped them for a swift departure, but Wigan confounded expectations to go unbeaten for the next 17 games and sat at the top the table by November. A weak finish saw Wigan win only three of their last 10 games to finish seventh in Division One – a last minute goal by West Ham's Brian Deane in the final game of the season saw the Latics drop out of the play-off places in favour of eventual play-off winners Crystal Palace.

== Transfers ==
=== In ===
| Player | Position | From | Fee | Date | Notes |
|---|---|---|---|---|---|
| James Salisbury | GK | Burnley | Free | 29 July 2003 | |
| Gary Walsh | GK | Bradford City | Free | 7 August 2003 | |
| Geoff Horsfield | FW | Birmingham City | £1 million | 5 September 2003 | |
| Jason Roberts | FW | West Bromwich Albion | £1.4 million | 14 January 2004 | |
| Alan Mahon | MF | Blackburn Rovers | Undisclosed | 6 February 2004 | |
| Gareth Farrelly | MF | Bolton Wanderers | Free | 9 March 2004 | |

=== Out ===
| Player | Position | To | Fee | Date | Notes |
|---|---|---|---|---|---|
| Ged Brannan | MF | Accrington Stanley | Free | 27 November 2003 | |
| Geoff Horsfield | FW | West Bromwich Albion | £1 million | 18 December 2003 | |
| Gareth Farrelly | MF | Bohemians | Released | 30 June 2004 | |
| Peter Kennedy | MF | Peterborough United | Released | 30 June 2004 | |
| Chris Lynch | DF | Hyde United | Released | 30 June 2004 | |
| Ryan Yeomans | GK | Lancaster City | Released | 30 June 2004 | |

=== Loans in ===
| Player | Pos | From | Date | Duration | Notes |
|---|---|---|---|---|---|
| Mark Burchill | FW | Portsmouth | 20 August 2003 | One month | |
| Jamie Lawrence | MF | Walsall | 19 November 2003 | One month | |
| Alan Rogers | DF | Leicester City | 1 December 2003 | Two months | |

=== Loans out ===
| Player | Pos | To | Date | Duration | Notes |
|---|---|---|---|---|---|
| Ged Brannan | MF | Rochdale | 11 September 2003 | Two months | |
| Tony Dinning | MF | Walsall | 19 November 2003 | One month | |
| Magno Vieira | FW | Northampton Town | 16 January 2004 | Two months | |
| Tony Dinning | MF | Blackpool | 24 January 2004 | One month | |
| James Salisbury | GK | Leigh RMI | 1 March 2004 | One month | |

== Pre-season ==
The club began their pre-season with a training camp based near Eindhoven, Netherlands, arranging friendlies against Belgian Pro League club KVC Westerlo, and second-tier Dutch side FC Eindhoven. Six additional friendlies were played when the team returned home.

Pre-season friendlies
| Date | Opponent | Venue | Result | Scorers | Notes |
|---|---|---|---|---|---|
| 15 July 2003 | KVC Westerlo | A | 1–0 | Bullard | |
| 17 July 2003 | FC Eindhoven | A | 2–2 | Kennedy, Liddell | |
| 22 July 2003 | Southport | A | 3–0 | Roberts, McCulloch, Bullard | |
| 23 July 2003 | Bradford Park Avenue | A | 4–0 | Roberts, Jarrett, Moore (2) | |
| 27 July 2003 | Falkirk | A | 0–1 | | |
| 29 July 2003 | Burscough | A | 0–2 | | |
| 30 July 2003 | Rochdale | A | 2–2 | Flynn, McCulloch | |
| 2 August 2003 | Blackburn Rovers | H | 1–0 | McCulloch | |

== Results ==
Wigan Athletic's score comes first

=== Legend ===
| Win | Draw | Loss |

=== Football League First Division ===
First Division match details
| Date | Opponent | Venue | Result | Attendance | Scorers |
|---|---|---|---|---|---|
| 9 August 2003 | Millwall | A | 0–2 | 10,898 | |
| 16 August 2003 | Preston North End | H | 1–1 | 12,073 | McCulloch |
| 23 August 2003 | Burnley | A | 2–0 | 13,231 | Kennedy, Ellington |
| 26 August 2003 | Ipswich Town | H | 1–0 | 8,292 | Ellington |
| 30 August 2003 | Rotherham United | A | 3–0 | 6,660 | Jarrett, Ellington, N. Roberts |
| 13 September 2003 | Wimbledon | A | 4–2 | 1,054 | Bullard, Liddell, Horsfield, Ellington |
| 16 September 2003 | West Bromwich Albion | H | 1–0 | 12,874 | Horsfield |
| 20 September 2003 | Watford | H | 1–0 | 9,211 | McCulloch |
| 27 September 2003 | Coventry City | A | 1–1 | 14,862 | Jackson |
| 30 September 2003 | Cardiff City | A | 0–0 | 15,143 | |
| 4 October 2003 | Norwich City | H | 1–1 | 9,346 | Liddell |
| 11 October 2003 | Derby County | A | 2–2 | 19,151 | Liddell (2) |
| 14 October 2003 | Stoke City | H | 2–1 | 7,678 | Horsfield (2) |
| 18 October 2003 | Gillingham | H | 1–0 | 6,696 | Liddell (pen) |
| 21 October 2003 | Sheffield United | H | 1–1 | 12,032 | Horsfield |
| 25 October 2003 | Walsall | A | 0–2 | 7,041 | |
| 1 November 2003 | Crystal Palace | H | 5–0 | 6,796 | Liddell (2, 1 pen), Horsfield, Ellington (2) |
| 8 November 2003 | Reading | A | 0–1 | 13,819 | |
| 22 November 2003 | Nottingham Forest | H | 2–2 | 10,403 | Ellington, Liddell |
| 29 November 2003 | West Ham United | A | 0–4 | 34,375 | |
| 2 December 2003 | Sunderland | A | 1–1 | 22,167 | De Vos |
| 6 December 2003 | Reading | H | 0–2 | 7,512 | |
| 13 December 2003 | Bradford City | H | 1–0 | 7,256 | Horsfield |
| 20 December 2003 | Crewe Alexandra | A | 3–2 | 7,873 | McCulloch, De Vos, Bullard |
| 26 December 2003 | Rotherham United | H | 1–2 | 9,235 | Ellington |
| 28 December 2003 | Sheffield United | A | 1–1 | 26,056 | Ellington |
| 10 January 2004 | Millwall | H | 0–0 | 7,047 | |
| 17 January 2004 | Preston North End | A | 4–2 | 19,161 | J. Roberts, Ellington (2), Teale |
| 31 January 2004 | Burnley | H | 0–0 | 11,147 | |
| 7 February 2004 | Ipswich Town | A | 3–1 | 22,093 | J. Roberts, Ellington, Teale |
| 14 February 2004 | Derby County | H | 2–0 | 9,146 | Ellington, McCulloch |
| 21 February 2004 | Stoke City | A | 1–1 | 14,927 | Ellington |
| 28 February 2004 | Walsall | H | 1–0 | 7,593 | Ellington |
| 6 March 2004 | Crewe Alexandra | H | 2–3 | 8,367 | McCulloch (2) |
| 13 March 2004 | Bradford City | A | 0–0 | 11,744 | |
| 16 March 2004 | West Bromwich Albion | A | 1–2 | 26,215 | Liddell (pen) |
| 20 March 2004 | Coventry City | H | 2–1 | 8,784 | J. Roberts (2) |
| 27 March 2004 | Watford | A | 1–1 | 13,382 | J. Roberts |
| 3 April 2004 | Wimbledon | H | 0–1 | 7,622 | |
| 6 April 2004 | Gillingham | A | 3–0 | 7,410 | Ellington, J. Roberts, Mahon |
| 9 April 2004 | Norwich City | A | 0–2 | 23,446 | |
| 13 April 2004 | Cardiff City | H | 3–0 | 8,052 | J. Roberts, Ellington |
| 17 April 2004 | Crystal Palace | A | 1–1 | 18,799 | Ellington |
| 24 April 2004 | Sunderland | H | 0–0 | 11,380 | |
| 1 May 2004 | Nottingham Forest | A | 0–1 | 29,172 | |
| 9 May 2004 | West Ham United | H | 1–1 | 20,669 | N. Roberts |

==== Final league table ====
| Pos | Team | Pld | W | D | L | GF | GA | GD | Pts | Promotion, qualification or relegation |
|---|---|---|---|---|---|---|---|---|---|---|
| 5 | Ipswich Town | 46 | 21 | 10 | 15 | 84 | 72 | +12 | 73 | Qualification for the First Division play-offs |
| 6 | Crystal Palace (O, P) | 46 | 21 | 10 | 15 | 72 | 61 | +11 | 73 | Qualification for the First Division play-offs |
| 7 | Wigan Athletic | 46 | 18 | 17 | 11 | 60 | 45 | +15 | 71 | |
| 8 | Sheffield United | 46 | 20 | 11 | 15 | 65 | 56 | +9 | 71 | |
| 9 | Reading | 46 | 20 | 10 | 16 | 55 | 57 | −2 | 70 | |

Source: Soccerway
Rules for classification: 1) points; 2) goal difference; 3) number of goals scored.
(O) Play-off winners; (P) Promoted

=== FA Cup ===
FA Cup match details
| Round | Date | Opponent | Venue | Result | Attendance | Goalscorers |
|---|---|---|---|---|---|---|
| R3 | 3 January 2004 | West Ham United | H | 1–2 | 11,793 | Quinn (own goal) |

=== League Cup ===
League Cup match details
| Round | Date | Opponent | Venue | Result | Attendance | Goalscorers |
|---|---|---|---|---|---|---|
| R1 | 12 August 2003 | Hull City | H | 2–0 | 3,295 | McCulloch, Jarrett |
| R2 | 23 September 2003 | Fulham | H | 1–0 | 4,874 | Ellington |
| R3 | 29 October 2003 | Middlesbrough | H | 1–2 | 8,046 | Bullard |

== Squad statistics ==
Squad at end of season

=== Appearances and goals ===
| No. | Pos | Nat | Player | Total | | Division One | | FA Cup | | League Cup | |
| No. | Pos | Nat | Player | Apps | Goals | Apps | Goals | Apps | Goals | Apps | Goals |
|---|---|---|---|---|---|---|---|---|---|---|---|
| 1 | GK | (Australia) AUS | John Filan | 47 | 0 | 45 | 0 | 1 | 0 | 1 | 0 |
| 2 | DF | (England) ENG | Paul Mitchell | 14 | 0 | 1+11 | 0 | 1 | 0 | 0+1 | 0 |
| 3 | DF | (Scotland) SCO | Stephen McMillan | 16 | 0 | 13+2 | 0 | 0 | 0 | 1 | 0 |
| 4 | DF | (England) ENG | Matt Jackson | 28 | 1 | 23+1 | 1 | 0+1 | 0 | 3 | 0 |
| 5 | DF | (Canada) CAN | Jason De Vos | 28 | 2 | 25+2 | 2 | 1 | 0 | 0 | 0 |
| 6 | DF | (England) ENG | Ian Breckin | 49 | 0 | 43+2 | 0 | 1 | 0 | 3 | 0 |
| 7 | MF | (Scotland) SCO | Andy Liddell | 43 | 9 | 35+5 | 9 | 0 | 0 | 3 | 0 |
| 8 | FW | (Wales) WAL | Neil Roberts | 32 | 2 | 9+19 | 2 | 1 | 0 | 2+1 | 0 |
| 9 | FW | (England) ENG | Nathan Ellington | 47 | 19 | 43+1 | 18 | 1 | 0 | 1+1 | 1 |
| 10 | FW | (Scotland) SCO | Lee McCulloch | 45 | 7 | 31+10 | 6 | 1 | 0 | 3 | 1 |
| 11 | MF | (Northern Ireland) NIR | Peter Kennedy | 15 | 1 | 10+2 | 1 | 0 | 0 | 3 | 0 |
| 12 | MF | (Wales) WAL | Michael Flynn | 9 | 0 | 1+7 | 0 | 0 | 0 | 0+1 | 0 |
| 13 | GK | (England) ENG | Gary Walsh | 5 | 0 | 1+2 | 0 | 0 | 0 | 2 | 0 |
| 14 | MF | (Republic of Ireland) IRL | Alan Mahon | 14 | 1 | 13+1 | 1 | 0 | 0 | 0 | 0 |
| 15 | MF | (Republic of Ireland) IRL | Gareth Farrelly | 7 | 0 | 3+4 | 0 | 0 | 0 | 0 | 0 |
| 16 | MF | (England) ENG | Tony Dinning | 14 | 0 | 11+2 | 0 | 0 | 0 | 1 | 0 |
| 18 | MF | (England) ENG | Jason Jarrett | 43 | 2 | 33+8 | 1 | 0 | 0 | 2 | 1 |
| 19 | DF | (England) ENG | Nicky Eaden | 50 | 0 | 46 | 0 | 1 | 0 | 3 | 0 |
| 20 | MF | (Scotland) SCO | Gary Teale | 30 | 2 | 15+13 | 2 | 1 | 0 | 0+1 | 0 |
| 21 | MF | (England) ENG | Jimmy Bullard | 50 | 3 | 46 | 2 | 1 | 0 | 3 | 1 |
| 22 | FW | (Brazil) BRA | Magno Vieira | 0 | 0 | 0 | 0 | 0 | 0 | 0 | 0 |
| 23 | GK | (England) ENG | James Salisbury | 0 | 0 | 0 | 0 | 0 | 0 | 0 | 0 |
| 25 | DF | (England) ENG | Chris Lynch | 0 | 0 | 0 | 0 | 0 | 0 | 0 | 0 |
| 26 | DF | (England) ENG | Leighton Baines | 28 | 0 | 23+3 | 0 | 1 | 0 | 1 | 0 |
| 27 | MF | (England) ENG | Greg Traynor | 0 | 0 | 0 | 0 | 0 | 0 | 0 | 0 |
| 30 | FW | (Grenada) GRN | Jason Roberts | 14 | 8 | 14 | 8 | 0 | 0 | 0 | 0 |
| 33 | GK | (England) ENG | Ryan Yeomans | 0 | 0 | 0 | 0 | 0 | 0 | 0 | 0 |
| 38 | FW | (England) ENG | David Moore | 0 | 0 | 0 | 0 | 0 | 0 | 0 | 0 |
Players who appeared for Wigan and left during the season:
| 14 | FW | (Scotland) SCO | Mark Burchill | 4 | 0 | 1+3 | 0 | 0 | 0 | 0 | 0 |
| 14 | MF | (Jamaica) JAM | Jamie Lawrence | 4 | 0 | 0+4 | 0 | 0 | 0 | 0 | 0 |
| 15 | FW | (England) ENG | Geoff Horsfield | 17 | 7 | 16 | 7 | 0 | 0 | 1 | 0 |
| 17 | MF | (England) ENG | Ged Brannan | 0 | 0 | 0 | 0 | 0 | 0 | 0 | 0 |
| 24 | DF | (England) ENG | Alan Rogers | 5 | 0 | 5 | 0 | 0 | 0 | 0 | 0 |
