= Nuno Mendes (footballer, born 1978) =

Portuguese footballer (born 1978)

Personal information
- Full name: Nuno Alexandre Pereira Mendes
- Date of birth: 7 April 1978 (age 48)
- Place of birth: Guimarães, Portugal
- Height: 5 ft 11 in (1.80 m)
- Positions: Defender; midfielder

Senior career*
Years	Team	Apps	(Gls)
1996–1999	Vitória Guimarães	6	(0)
1997–1998	→ Aves (loan)	27	(4)
1998–1999	→ Felgueiras (loan)	28	(2)
1999–2000	Chaves	27	(2)
2000–2002	Strasbourg	7	(0)
2001–2002	→ União Leiria (loan)	16	(0)
2002–2003	Braga	2	(0)
2003–2004	Moreirense	7	(0)
2004–2005	Santa Clara	17	(1)
2005–2006	Plymouth Argyle	2	(0)
2006	Créteil	7	(0)
2007	Penafiel	6	(0)
2007–2009	Aves	27	(2)
2009	Moreirense	12	(4)
2009–2010	Trofense	9	(0)
2010–2011	Gondomar	13	(2)
Total		213	(17)

International career
2000	Portugal U21	4	(0)
- * Club domestic league appearances and goals

Nuno Alexandre Pereira Mendes (born 7 April 1978) is a Portuguese former professional footballer who could play in defence and midfield.

He began his career with Vitória Guimarães and made his first team debut during the 1996–97 Primeira Liga season. Mendes spent three seasons in Liga de Honra, playing for Aves, Felgueiras and Chaves respectively before moving to France to join Division 1 club Strasbourg in 2000. He returned to Portugal a year later to play for União Leiria, managed by José Mourinho, before spending a brief period with Braga in 2002. Mendes spent 18 months with Moreirense and then dropped down a division to play for Santa Clara in 2004.

A year later, Mendes played in England for Championship club Plymouth Argyle before returning to France with Créteil of Ligue 2. Having spent a brief spell with Penafiel in 2007, he returned to Aves, where he played for two seasons in Liga de Honra. He dropped down to the Portuguese third division in 2009 to play for Moreirense before spending a season with Trofense. Mendes retired in 2011 after a year with third division side Gondomar. He represented Portugal at under-21 level.

== Club career ==
Mendes was born in Guimarães. He joined his home town club, Vitória Guimarães, at an early age and progressed through their youth system. He made his first team debut in a 4–1 win against Chaves on 23 February 1997. He made 5 more appearances that season, including a 1–0 defeat to Marítimo on 2 May 1997, which was his last for Vitória. Mendes joined Liga de Honra side Aves on loan for the 1997–98 season. He scored four goals in 27 league appearances for the club as they finished 15th in the table. The following season, he joined Felgueiras on loan. They finished 5th in Liga de Honra and Mendes was a first team regular. He made 28 league appearances and scored two goals.^{[A]} Mendes had his contract with Vitória Guimarães terminated in June 1999, allowing him to sign a two-year deal with Chaves.

He made 27 league appearances in his only season with the club, scoring twice, as they finished 12th in Liga de Honra. He moved to France in June 2000 to play for Division 1 club Strasbourg. Having signed a four-year contract, he made his debut in a 1–1 draw at Lille on 29 November 2000. He found first team opportunities limited during the 2000–01 season, making six more league appearances as the club were relegated to Division 2.^{[B]} However, the season did end well for Mendes as he won his first trophy as a professional, the Coupe de France. He made two appearances in the competition, but did not play in the final where Strasbourg defeated Amiens on penalties.

Mendes returned to Portugal ahead of the 2001–02 season, joining Primeira Liga club União Leiria on a season-long loan. Reflecting on his time in France, he said "I never hid my desire to return to Portugal, but now I can not say anything more." He made his debut on 11 August 2001 in a 0–0 draw at Braga. Mendes played regularly under the management of José Mourinho prior to his departure to Porto, but fell out of favour under his replacement, Vítor Pontes. He made 16 league appearances for Leiria, helping the club finish 7th in the Primeira Liga, before returning to Strasbourg. Upon his departure, Mendes was critical of the club's president João Bartolomeu, who he believed created instability at the club. "The Union of Leiria is a complicated club at senior management level, especially the president, who sees things where they do not exist and it creates instability in the squad," said Mendes who "leaves great friends in Leiria".

In May 2002, he signed a two-year contract with Braga. He made his debut in a 3–2 defeat at Belenenses on 5 October 2002. In a season disrupted by injuries, Mendes only played in one more match for Braga, against his old club Vitória Guimarães.^{[C]} He had his contract cancelled in January 2003, which allowed him to join Moreirense. He made his debut on 3 February 2003 in a 1–1 draw at Benfica. He made two more appearances that season as the club finished 12th in the table. Having fractured his foot in July 2003, he was used sparingly during the 2003–04 season by manager Manuel Machado. He made four league appearances in an injury-plagued season, as the club finished 9th in the Primeira Liga. Mendes dropped down a division in June 2004 after signing a one-year contract with Santa Clara. "This project is attractive," he said. "The coach, Jose Morais, spoke to me and showed willingness in me to go to the Azores and that's important. I know that Santa Clara is going through some difficulties, but the Department intends to make a financial recovery in time and maybe next season bet on rising."

He made his debut on 29 August 2004 in a 3–1 defeat against Feirense and was sent off for two bookable offences. The club finished 15th in Liga de Honra in the 2004–05 season, with Mendes making 17 league appearances.^{[D]} He scored his first goal for the club in his final game, a 4–0 win against Naval on 22 May 2005. After his contract with Santa Clara expired, he joined English Championship club Plymouth Argyle on their pre-season tour of Sweden in July 2005. Having appeared in friendlies against Betsele and Umeå, he signed a permanent contract with the club. "I am delighted to have got him," said manager Bobby Williamson of his new signing. "It's a great opportunity that I could not miss," Mendes said in an interview with Portuguese newspaper Record. "It is valid for two seasons, with a few perks that are unheard of in Portugal. Essentially, the level of premiums for targets, as is normal in English football."

Mendes made his debut in a 1–0 defeat at Crystal Palace on 20 August 2005. He made two more appearances, including one in a 2–1 League Cup win against Peterborough United, before losing his place in the squad when Bobby Williamson was replaced by Tony Pulis as manager. He had a trial with Major League Soccer club New York Metrostars in January 2006 before his contract with Plymouth Argyle was cancelled by mutual consent. In June 2006, he returned to France where he signed a two-year contract with Créteil of Ligue 2. He made his debut on 28 July 2006 in a 0–0 draw with Guingamp. Mendes made six more appearances for the club, before being released from his contract in December 2006. A month later, he returned to Portugal where he signed a short-term contract with Liga de Honra club Penafiel. He made his debut in a 1–0 defeat at Rio Ave on 4 February 2007, and made 5 more appearances during the 2006–07 season as Penafiel finished 8th in the table. Having reached the end of his contract with the club, Mendes returned to Aves ahead of the new season.

He made his league debut on 18 August 2007 in a 2–1 defeat at home to Olhanense. Mendes scored his first goal in his second stint for Aves on 17 February 2008 in a 1–1 draw with Trofense, and he scored again one week later in a 2–1 defeat at Varzim. He finished the 2007–08 season with 23 league appearances and two goals, helping the club finish 8th in the Liga de Honra table. He made four more league appearances the following season,^{[E]} before being released from his contract in January 2009 due to a lack of first team opportunities. Mendes dropped down to the third division of Portuguese football later that month, for the first time in his career, to return to Moreirense. He made his debut on 25 January 2009 in a 1–0 win at Chaves, and scored his first goal a week later in a 2–2 draw with Tirsense. Mendes scored two goals in a 3–0 win against Ribeirão on 8 February 2009 and was sent off later in the game. He scored four goals in 12 appearances for the club, but Moreirense were unable to gain promotion back to Liga de Honra, finishing 2nd, three points behind Chaves.

In August 2009, Mendes joined Liga de Honra club Trofense on a one-year contract. He made his league debut on 19 September 2009 in a 3–0 defeat at Feirense. He made eight more league appearances, before being released from his contract in January 2010. He then returned to the Segunda Divisão with Gondomar and he made his debut on 31 January 2010 in a 2–0 win against Vieira. His first goal for the club came one week later in a 4–4 draw with Espinho. Mendes scored his second goal in a 2–1 win against Padroense. He made 12 league appearances in the 2009–10 season, scoring twice, as they finished 4th in the table. Having lost his place in the team during the 2010–11 season – making one league appearance – Mendes left Gondomar at the end of the campaign and subsequently retired from playing.

== International career ==
Mendes represented the Portugal national team at every youth level: under-16 to under-21. He earned four caps at under-21 level.

== Career statistics ==
Appearances and goals by club, season and competition
Club	Season	League			National cup		League cup		Total	
Club	Season	Division	Apps	Goals	Apps	Goals	Apps	Goals	Apps	Goals
Vitória Guimarães	1996–97	Primeira Divisão	6	0	0	0	—	—	6	0
Vitória Guimarães	1997–98	Primeira Divisão	0	0	0	0	—	—	0	0
Vitória Guimarães	1998–99	Primeira Divisão	0	0	0	0	—	—	0	0
Vitória Guimarães	Total		6	0	0	0	0	0	6	0
Aves (loan)	1997–98	Segunda Divisão de Honra	27	4	0	0	—	—	27	4
Felgueiras (loan)	1998–99	Segunda Divisão de Honra	28	2	0	0	—	—	28	2
Chaves	1999–2000	Segunda Liga	27	2	1	0	—	—	28	2
Strasbourg	2000–01	Division 1	7	0	2	0	1	0	10	0
Strasbourg	2001–02	Division 2	0	0	0	0	0	0	0	0
Strasbourg	Total		7	0	2	0	1	0	10	0
União Leiria (loan)	2001–02	Primeira Liga	16	0	1	0	—	—	17	0
Braga	2002–03	Primeira Liga	2	0	0	0	—	—	2	0
Moreirense	2002–03	Primeira Liga	3	0	1	0	—	—	4	0
Moreirense	2003–04	Primeira Liga	4	0	0	0	—	—	4	0
Moreirense	Total		7	0	1	0	0	0	8	0
Santa Clara	2004–05	Liga de Honra	17	1	0	0	—	—	17	1
Plymouth Argyle	2005–06	Championship	2	0	0	0	1	0	3	0
Créteil	2006–07	Ligue 2	7	0	0	0	1	0	8	0
Penafiel	2006–07	Liga de Honra	6	0	0	0	1	0	7	0
Aves	2007–08	Liga de Honra	23	2	2	0	1	0	26	2
Aves	2008–09	Liga de Honra	4	0	2	1	2	0	8	1
Aves	Total		27	2	4	1	3	0	34	3
Moreirense	2008–09	Segunda Divisão	12	4	0	0	—	—	12	4
Trofense	2009–10	Liga de Honra	9	0	1	0	4	0	14	0
Gondomar	2009–10	Segunda Divisão	12	2	0	0	—	—	12	2
Gondomar	2010–11	Segunda Divisão	1	0	1	0	—	—	2	0
Gondomar	Total		13	2	1	0	0	0	14	2
Career total			213	17	11	1	11	0	235	18

== Honours ==
Strasbourg

- Coupe de France: 2000–01

== Footnotes ==
A.: According to L'Équipe, he scored two goals for Felgueiras in the 1998–99 season. Futebol365 give him one.
B.: Mendes has two profiles on the Ligue de Football Professionnel website, one for his Strasbourg career in Division 1, and one for his career with Créteil in Ligue 2. The former says six appearances instead of seven because his latter profile was used in the match with SC Bastia.
C.: His profile on ForaDeJogo says he scored three goals in three appearances for Braga, but only list two matches in detail, against Belenenses and Vitória Guimarães. Two matches is consistent with L'Équipe which state that Mendes appeared in matches against those two clubs without scoring.
D.: The Portuguese League for Professional Football website lists Mendes as having played 16 league matches in the 2004–05 season, but left his name out of the starting line-up for the game against Leixões, leaving them with ten players in the team instead of eleven.
E.: ForaDeJogo and the Portuguese League for Professional Football disagree on who came on as a substitute in the match against Sporting Covilhã. ForaDeJogo says that Mendes played in the match, meaning he played in 5 league matches for Aves in the 2008–09 season. However, the Portuguese League for Professional Football does not.
