= 2005–06 Plymouth Argyle F.C. season =

English football club season

Plymouth Argyle
2005–06 season
- Chairman: Paul Stapleton
- Manager: Tony Pulis
- Stadium: Home Park
- Championship: 14th
- FA Cup: Third round (eliminated by Wolves)
- League Cup: Second round (eliminated by Barnet)
- Highest home attendance: 17,726 vs Leeds United (2 January 2006)
- Lowest home attendance: 13,308 vs Peterborough United (23 August 2005)
Home colours	Away colours

Plymouth Argyle competed in the Football League Championship in the 2005–06 season, having finished 17th place in the season prior. They underwent a change in their manager, replacing Bobby Williamson with Tony Pulis in the hope of seeing an improvement to the previous season. The "Green Army" finished 14th in the league and made it to the 3rd round of the FA Cup.

== Season summary ==
After a poor start to the season, which made relegation a likely outcome, Argyle fired manager Bobby Williamson and brought in Tony Pulis. Argyle regrouped under Pulis and regained a solid place in the middle of the league standings. The team's performance was one of contrasts. Argyle conceded only 46 goals, which made it the fifth (tied) best defense in the league although they only scored 39 goals, which made it the third (tied) worst attack in the league. It meant a lot of 0–0, 1–0, and 0–1 games – results that are synonymous with Pulis' style of football. However, under new manager Pulis, Argyle were never in any significant danger of relegation.

== Notable events ==
- In August, Argyle opens the season by defeating Reading 2–1 at the Madejski Stadium. It would be Reading's only home loss in the Championship all season. Victory at Reading is followed by a draw and four losses in the Championship.
- 6–23 September, manager Bobby Williamson is fired. Jocky Scott is named caretaker manager. Tony Pulis is named as the new manager.
- September–October, Pulis's first shores up the Argyle defence and achieves a record of one win, one loss, and five draws in first seven games under his management.
- 22 November – 18 February, young central defender Elliott Ward comes to Argyle on loan from West Ham. He stays for three months and proves successful on the field and popular with the fans. In 15 games with Ward, Argyle concede only 15 goals and achieve a record of 6 wins, 5 draws, and four losses in the Championship. Argyle move up to mid-table and while not safe from relegation, it seems very unlikely.
- 18 February, striker Vincent Pericard, on loan from Portsmouth, scores a hat trick against Coventry City in a 3–1 victory. This was the biggest win of the season by low-scoring Argyle.

== Squad ==
Squad at end of season

Note: Flags indicate national team as defined under FIFA eligibility rules; some limited exceptions apply. Players may hold more than one non-FIFA nationality.

No.	Pos.	Nation	Player
1	GK	FRA	Romain Larrieu
2	DF	ENG	Anthony Barness
3	DF	ENG	Rufus Brevett
4	MF	FRA	Lilian Nalis
6	MF	SCO	Keith Lasley
7	MF	ENG	David Norris
8	MF	HUN	Ákos Buzsáky
9	FW	IRL	Mickey Evans (Note: Evans was born in Plymouth, England, but qualified to represent the Republic of Ireland internationally and made his international debut for Ireland in 1997.)
10	FW	FRA	Vincent Péricard (Note: Péricard was born in Efok, Cameroon, but was raised in France from the age of 4 and represented them at U-21 level.) (on loan from Portsmouth)
11	FW	ENG	Nick Chadwick
13	DF	FRA	Mathias Kouo-Doumbé
14	DF	NIR	Tony Capaldi (Note: Capaldi was born in Porsgrunn, Norway, but also qualified to represent Northern Ireland internationally and made his international debut for Northern Ireland in March 2004.)
15	DF	ENG	Paul Wotton
16	DF	ENG	Hasney Aljofree

No.	Pos.	Nation	Player
17	MF	WAL	Anthony Pulis (on loan from Stoke City (Note: Pulis was born in Bristol, England, but also qualified to represent Wales internationally through his father and represented them at U-21 level.))
18	FW	ENG	Leon Clarke (on loan from Wolverhampton Wanderers)
20	MF	ENG	Lee Hodges
22	DF	ENG	Paul Connolly
23	GK	ENG	Luke McCormick
25	DF	ENG	Ryan Dickson
26	FW	ENG	Chris Zebroski
27	FW	ENG	Reuben Reid
29	MF	ENG	Luke Summerfield
30	GK	ENG	James Debbage
32	MF	SWE	Bojan Djordjic (Note: Djordic was born in Belgrade, SFR Yugoslavia (now Serbia), but also qualified to represent Sweden internationally and represented them at U-19 and U-21 level.)

=== Left the club during season ===
Note: Flags indicate national team as defined under FIFA eligibility rules; some limited exceptions apply. Players may hold more than one non-FIFA nationality.

No.	Pos.	Nation	Player
4	DF	NGA	Taribo West (released)
10	FW	ENG	Scott Taylor (to MK Dons)
17	MF	ISL	Bjarni Guðjónsson (to ÍA)
18	DF	POR	Nuno Mendes (released)

No.	Pos.	Nation	Player
19	FW	ENG	Matt Derbyshire (on loan from Blackburn Rovers)
21	DF	ENG	Elliott Ward (to West Ham United)
27	MF	ENG	Jason Jarrett (on loan from Norwich City)
28	MF	ENG	Marcus Martin (to Truro City)

== Transfers ==
=== Out ===
Date	Player	Transfer	To	Fee	Source
June 2005	Matthew Villis	Sale	Torquay United	£0	
July 2005	Gary Sawyer	Season-long loan	Exeter City	N/A	
July 2005	Graham Coughlan	Sale	Sheffield Wednesday	£100,000	
July 2005	Peter Gilbert	Sale	Leicester City	£200,000	
6 October 2005	Taribo West	Released	Free Agent	N/A	
January 2006	Matt Derbyshire	Recalled from loan	Blackburn Rovers	N/A	
January 2006	Jason Jarrett	Recalled from loan	Norwich City	N/A	
17 January 2006	Scott Taylor	Sale	Milton Keynes Dons	£100,000	
31 January 2006	Nuno Mendes	Released	Free Agent	N/A	
31 January 2006	Bjarni Guðjónsson	Released	Free agent	N/A	
February 2006	Keith Lasley	Short-term loan	Blackpool	N/A	
February 2006	Elliott Ward	Recalled from loan	West Ham United	N/A	
27 February 2006	Rufus Brevett	Short-term loan	Leicester City	N/A	
June 2006	Rufus Brevett	Released	Free agent	N/A	
June 2006	Keith Lasley	Released	Blackpool	N/A	

=== In ===
Date	Player	Transfer	From	Fee
18 May 2005	Ákos Buzsáky	Buy	F.C. Porto	£250,000
31 May 2005	Bojan Djordjic	Buy	Rangers	£0
15 June 2005	Anthony Barness	Buy	Bolton Wanderers	£0
5 July 2005	Taribo West	Buy	Al-Arabi	£0
19 July 2005	Nuno Mendes	Buy	CD Santa Clara	£0
July 2005	Rufus Brevett	Buy	West Ham United	£0
August 2005	Matt Derbyshire	Season Loan	Blackburn Rovers	N/A
22 November 2005	Elliott Ward	Short Term Loan	West Ham United	N/A
24 November 2005	Jason Jarrett	Short Term Loan	Norwich City	N/A
13 January 2006	Lilian Nalis	Buy	Sheffield United	£0
10 February 2006	Vincent Péricard	Short-term loan	Portsmouth	N/A

== Competitions ==
=== Championship ===
==== League table ====
Pos	Team	Pld	W	D	L	GF	GA	GD	Pts
12	Southampton	46	13	19	14	49	50	−1	58
13	Stoke City	46	17	7	22	54	63	−9	58
14	Plymouth Argyle	46	13	17	16	39	46	−7	56
15	Ipswich Town	46	14	14	18	53	66	−13	56
16	Leicester City	46	13	15	18	51	59	−8	54

Updated to match(es) played on 2 December 2011. Source: RSSSF
Rules for classification: 1) points; 2) goal difference; 3) number of goals scored.

==== Results ====
Championship match details
Date	Opponent	Venue	Result	Score F–A	Scorers	Attendance	Ref.
6 August 2005	Reading	Away	W	2–1			
9 August 2005	Watford	Home	D	3–3			
13 August 2005	Derby County	Home	L	0–2			
20 August 2005	Crystal Palace	Away	L	0–1			
27 August 2005	Hull City	Home	L	0–1			
29 August 2005	Brighton & Hove Albion	Away	L	0–2			
10 September 2005	Norwich City	Away	L	0–2		23,981	
13 September 2005	Crewe Alexandra	Home	D	1–1	Taylor 12'	10,460	
17 September 2005	Burnley	Home	W	1–0	Evans 46'	11,829	
24 September 2005	Southampton	Away	D	0–0		26,331	
27 September 2005	Sheffield United	Away	L	0–2		20,111	
1 October 2005	Stoke City	Home	W	2–1	Russell 50 og, Buzsaky 77	12,604	
15 October 2005	Sheffield Wednesday	Home	D	1–1	Wotton 79 pen	16,534	
18 October 2005	Queens Park Rangers	Away	D	1–1	Buzsaky 39'	11,741	
22 October 2005	Luton Town	Away	D	1–1	Djordjic 90'	8,714	
30 October 2005	Millwall	Home	D	0–0		11,764	
5 November 2005	Ipswich Town	Away	L	1–3	Buzsaky 51'	23,083	
19 November 2005	Queens Park Rangers	Home	W	3–1	Wotton 7 pen, Doumbe 37, Chadwick 51'	13,213	
22 November 2005	Sheffield Wednesday	Away	D	0–0		20,244	
26 November 2005	Reading	Home	L	0–2		14,020	
3 December 2005	Coventry City	Away	L	1–3	Norris 25'	18,796	
10 December 2005	Watford	Away	D	1–1	Chadwick 48'	12,884	
17 December 2005	Crystal Palace	Home	W	2–0			
26 December 2005	Cardiff City	Away	W	2–0			
31 December 2005	Wolverhampton Wanderers	Away	D	1–1			
2 January 2006	Leeds United	Home	L	0–3			
14 January 2006	Norwich City	Home	D	1–1			
21 January 2006	Crewe Alexandra	Away	W	2–1			
24 January 2006 (Note: Match originally scheduled for 1 November 2005, but was abandoned at half-time due to a waterlogged pitch, with Plymouth 1–0 ahead.)	Leicester City	Home	W	1–0			
31 January 2006	Southampton	Home	W	2–1			
4 February 2006	Burnley	Away	L	0–1			
11 February 2006	Sheffield United	Home	D	0–0			
14 February 2006	Stoke City	Away	D	0–0			
18 February 2006	Coventry City	Home	W	3–1			
25 February 2006	Derby County	Away	L	0–1			
4 March 2006	Brighton & Hove Albion	Home	W	1–0			
7 March 2006	Preston North End	Home	D	0–0			
11 March 2006	Hull City	Away	L	0–1			
18 March 2006	Cardiff City	Home	L	0–1			
25 March 2006	Preston North End	Away	D	0–0			
1 April 2006	Wolverhampton Wanderers	Home	W	2–0			
8 April 2006	Leeds United	Away	D	0–0			
15 April 2006	Millwall	Away	D	1–1			
17 April 2006	Luton Town	Home	L	1–2			
22 April 2006	Leicester City	Away	L	0–1			
30 April 2006	Ipswich Town	Home	W	2–1			

=== FA Cup ===
FA Cup match details
Round	Date	Opponents	Venue	Result	Score F–A	Scorers	Attendance	Ref.
Third round	7 January 2006	Wolverhampton Wanderers	Away	L	0–1		11,041	

=== League Cup ===
League Cup match details
Round	Date	Opponents	Venue	Result	Score F–A	Scorers	Attendance	Ref.
First round	23 August 2005	Peterborough United	Home	W	2–1	Wotton 35' pen., Taylor 38'	5,974	
Second round	20 September 2005	Barnet	Away	L	1–2	Buzsaky 19'	1,941	
