= Sam Gargan (footballer) =

English footballer

Personal information
- Full name: Sam Joseph Gargan
- Date of birth: 24 January 1989 (age 37)
- Place of birth: Brighton, England
- Height: 6 ft 3 in (1.91 m)
- Position: Striker

Youth career
- 2005–2007: Brighton & Hove Albion

Senior career*
Years	Team	Apps	(Gls)
2007–2009	Brighton & Hove Albion	1	(0)
2007	→ Worthing (loan)	19	(13)
2007–2008	→ Bognor Regis Town (loan)	5	(1)
2008	→ Welling United (loan)	16	(9)
2008	→ Havant & Waterlooville (loan)	5	(1)
2008	→ Lewes (loan)	8	(3)
2009	→ Eastbourne Borough (loan)	6	(1)
2009–2010	Sutton United	45	(17)
2010–2015	Whitehawk	110	(48)
2014	→ Peacehaven & Telscombe (loan)		
2015	Burgess Hill Town	8	(5)
2016	Whitehawk	4	(0)
2016	→ Burgess Hill Town (loan)		
2016–2017	Burgess Hill Town		
- * Club domestic league appearances and goals as of 07:48, 21 June 2016 (UTC)

Sam Joseph Gargan (born 24 January 1989, in Brighton) is an English footballer who plays as a striker whose last known club was Burgess Hill Town.

His professional career started at Brighton & Hove Albion in 2007. He spent two years at the club but only made the one appearance. Meanwhile, he enjoyed loan spells at Worthing, Bognor Regis Town, Welling United, Havant & Waterlooville, Lewes and Eastbourne Borough. In 2009, he dropped out of the Football League and signed for Sutton United, before moving to Whitehawk in 2010. Gargan briefly played for Burgess Hill Town in 2015, but re-signed for Whitehawk at the end of the year after scoring four times for The Hillians in a 5–1 victory over Merstham. He returned to Burgess Hill Town on loan, before finally ending the season with Whitehawk. He rejoined Burgess Hill Town for the start of the 2016–17 season.

== Playing career ==
=== Brighton & Hove Albion ===
On 6 January 2007, for the Third Round FA Cup tie away at West Ham United, Gargan was involved in the first-team squad for the first time, travelling with the squad. He didn't make the bench, but was seen warming up on the pitch with all the other players beforehand, displaying the number 37 on his shorts. In May 2007, Gargan was offered a one-year professional contract with Brighton.

At the beginning of May 2007 it was revealed that Gargan, along with fellow other youth team players Sonny Cobbs, Lloyd Skinner and Chris Winterton were to be loaned out for three months to local teams for them to gain experience playing at a professional level. Gargan and Cobbs joined Worthing. Gargan scored a prolific thirteen goals in nineteen league games. In November 2007, he joined teammate Scott Chamberlain on loan at Conference South team Bognor Regis Town. After spending two months at Bognor, Gargan then moved on to Conference South rivals Welling United on a further loan deal, where he was re-united with ex-Brighton player Richard Carpenter. In sixteen league games at Welling, Gargan netted nine times. He made his Football League and Brighton debut on 26 April 2008, coming on as an 85th-minute substitute for Glenn Murray during the 2–0 away victory over Bristol Rovers at the Memorial Stadium. At the end of the season he signed another one-year contract.

In a pre-season friendly with Selsey he scored a hat-trick. At the start of the 2008–09 season, Gargan joined Conference South side Havant & Waterlooville on a one-month loan. After the conclusion of this loan deal, Gargan then joined Conference National team Lewes on a one-month loan deal, and scored on his debut away at Histon; he then went on to score three goals in six games for the Rooks. Teammate Michael Standing was full of praise for the youngster, and said "he wins headers and gets hold of the ball" and made "a real difference to us". In January 2009, he transferred to rival Sussex team Eastbourne Borough on a month loan. With the bad weather in February and games being postponed, Gargan managed to make only two appearances and scored one goal (against Histon). He returned to Brighton and was an unused substitute during the 4–0 home defeat to Crewe Alexandra on 28 February 2009, before two weeks later returning to Eastbourne on loan for the remainder of the season. His loan spell was cut short however after suffering a knee injury against Salisbury City, which later needed surgery on his knee cartilage. It was announced in May 2009, that Gargan would be leaving Brighton after the expiration of his contract at the end of June 2009.

=== Sutton United ===
Gargan was signed by Sutton United manager Paul Doswell in the summer of 2009, along with his former colleague Sonny Cobbs. Gargan established himself as a first team regular, often playing as the sole target man following the departure of Sutton striker Stefan Payne to Fulham. He scored seventeen goals in 46 games over all competitions, as his club came second in the league before losing in the play-offs to Kingstonian. United believed they had lost the player as he went missing after the match, but this appeared not to be the case after Gargan revealed he had been with family in Spain and was unaware of the club's attempts to contact him. He said he would return to Sutton for next season if his attempts at finding a higher level club were to fail.

During the summer of 2010 he was handed a trial at Port Vale by his former manager from Brighton Micky Adams. However he instead opted for a trial at League Two rivals Gillingham, playing in "Gills" colours for the first time in a friendly match with Braintree Town. He later played a pre-season friendly for Rushden & Diamonds. After no success, Gargan declined Sutton's offer to re-sign and instead joined his local team Whitehawk, where his father has strong links. He finished top scorer in an interrupted first season narrowly missing out on promotion. The following season he finished as the club's top scorer again this time netting 23 times from 45 starts as the club finished the 2011–12 season as Isthmian League Division One South champions and won the Sussex Senior Cup for the first time in 50 years with Gargan scoring the winning goal.

== Statistics ==
Club performance			League		Cup		League Cup		Total	
Season	Club	League	Apps	Goals	Apps	Goals	Apps	Goals	Apps	Goals
England			League		FA Cup		League Cup		Total	
2007–08	Brighton & Hove Albion	League One	1	0	0	0	0	0	1	0
2007–08	Worthing	Isthmian Division One South	19	13	0	0	0	0	19	13
2007–08	Bognor Regis Town	Conference South	5	1	0	0	0	0	5	1
2007–08	Welling United	Conference South	16	9	0	0	0	0	16	9
2008–09	Brighton & Hove Albion	League One	0	0	0	0	0	0	0	0
2008–09	Havant & Waterlooville	Conference South	5	1	0	0	0	0	5	1
2008–09	Lewes	Conference National	8	3	0	0	0	0	8	3
2008–09	Eastbourne Borough	Conference National	6	1	0	0	0	0	6	1
2009–10	Sutton United	Isthmian Premier Division	45	12	0	0	0	0	45	17
2010–11	Whitehawk	Isthmian Division One South	21	17	0	0	0	0	21	17
2011–12	Whitehawk	Isthmian Division One South	34	13	5	3	0	0	39	16
2012–13	Whitehawk	Isthmian Premier	16	8	3	3	0	0	19	11
2013–14	Whitehawk	National League South	17	4	0	0	0	0	19	11
2014–15	Whitehawk	National League South	23	2	1	0	0	0	24	2
2015–16	Whitehawk	National League South	4	0	0	0	0	0	4	0
Total	England		231	84	9	6	0	0	240	90
Career total			231	84	9	6	0	0	240	90

Notes

a. Football League Trophy results included in totals.

== Honours ==
with Sutton United

- Isthmian League Premier Division runner-up: 2009–10
