= Jonathan Pendlebury =

English rugby union player

- Born: Jonathan Pendlebury; 15 January 1983 (age 43) England
- Height: 6 ft 4 in (1.93 m)
- Weight: 17 st 5 lb (110 kg)

Rugby union career
- Position: Lock
- Current team: Leeds Carnegie
Senior career
Years	Team	Apps	(Points)
- Rotherham
2004–2008	Gloucester	23	(0)
2008–	Leeds Carnegie		

Jonathan Pendlebury (born 15 January 1983) is an English rugby union footballer, currently playing for Leeds Carnegie as a lock.

Pendlebury had a very successful start to his rugby career. Representing his country at U18, U19 and U21 level. He enjoyed his time with the U21 squad, as he was selected for the U21 England squad in the FIRA World Cup. He then joined the ranks at Bath Academy before returning home to play for the Rotherham Titans.

== Success with Gloucester ==
Pendlebury arrived at Kingsholm in the 2004–05 Zurich Premiership from the Rotherham Titans and earned a full-time deal a year later. The second row is most at home at blindside flanker.

He initially put pressure on Adam Eustace, and made his first team debut against Toulon in the 2005–06 European Challenge Cup. His competitive nature shone through and he was key in Gloucester's success in the European Challenge Cup in 2006. Making 6 appearances in total in the competition and starting in the final against London Irish at the Stoop, which Gloucester won 36–34.
