= Ian Pendlebury =

English footballer

Personal information
- Date of birth: 3 September 1983 (age 43)
- Place of birth: Bolton, England
- Position: Defender

Senior career*
| Years | Team | Apps | (Gls) |
| 2001–2003 | Wigan Athletic | 4 | (0) |
| 2003 | Leigh RMI | 8 | (0) |
| 2003–2004 | Hyde United | 33 | (2) |
- * Club domestic league appearances and goals

Ian Pendlebury (born 3 September 1983) is an English former footballer who played as a defender for Wigan Athletic, Leigh RMI and Hyde United.

Pendlebury made his debut for Wigan in 2001, making four league appearances for the club before being released in March 2003.

== Honours ==
=== Club ===
Leigh RMI

- Lancashire FA Challenge Trophy (1): 2002−03
