= Withdean Stadium =

Athletics stadium

Coordinates: 50°51′7″N 0°9′32″W

- Withdean, Brighton
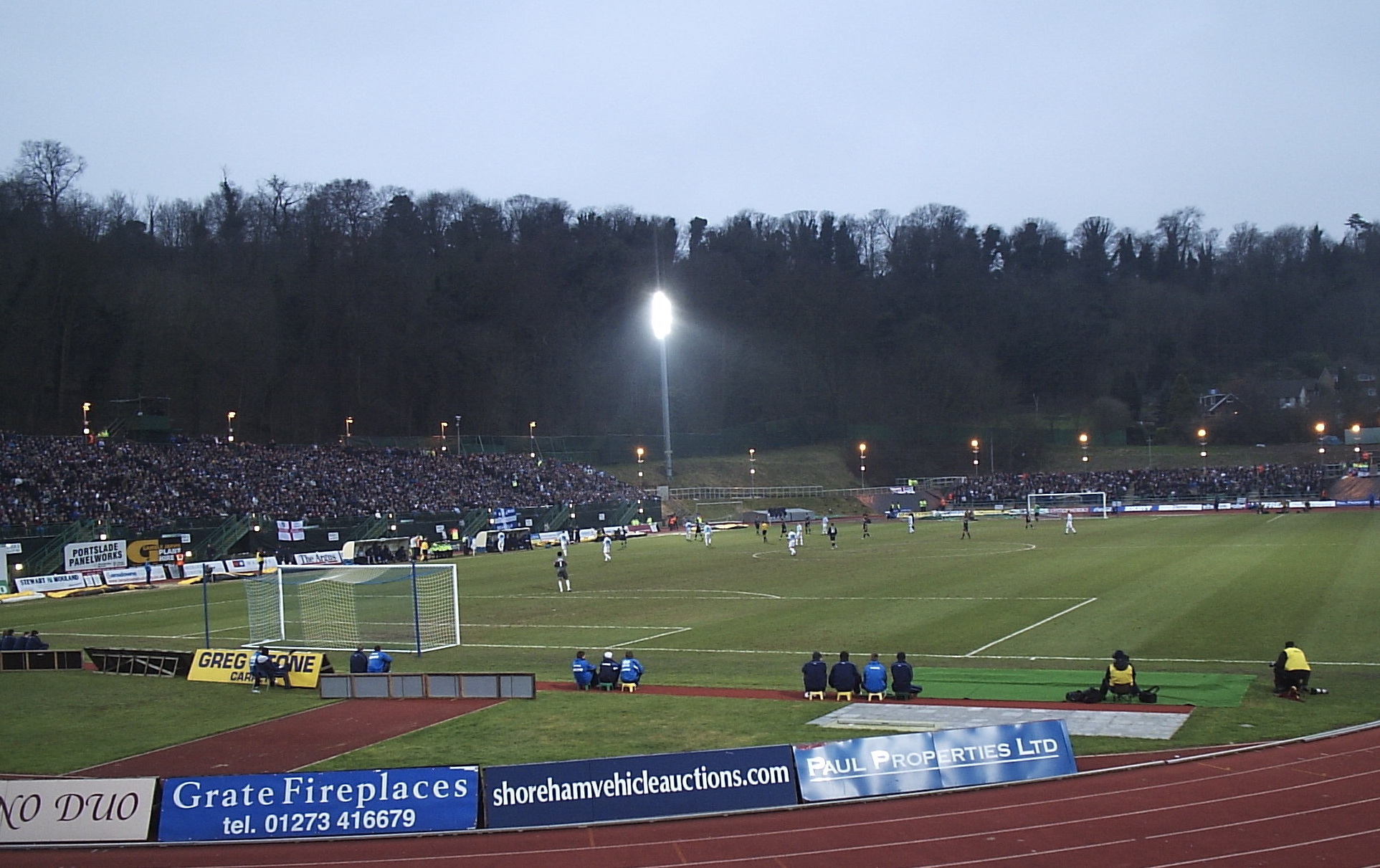
- Interactive map of Withdean Stadium
- Full name: Withdean Stadium
- Location: Brighton, England
- Capacity: 1,350
- Record attendance: 12,500; American football (Brighton B52s v. City College Of San Francisco Rams, 76-0 To San Francisco, 8 December 1985)
- Field size: 110 x 75 yards

Construction
- Built: 1936
- Opened: 1936

Tenants
- Brighton & Hove Athletics Club Brighton Phoenix; Arena 80 Withdean (1989–2000); Brighton & Hove Albion (1999–2011); Brighton Electricity (2014–); AFC Varndeanians (2015–)

Withdean Stadium is an athletics stadium in Withdean, a suburb of Brighton. It was constructed in 1930. It was the home track of Olympic athlete Steve Ovett. Between 1999 and 2011 it was the home ground of football team Brighton & Hove Albion F.C.

== History ==
The site was opened as a lawn tennis club venue in 1936, having been used as playing fields before this. The centre court had seating for 2,000 and was used for the Davis Cup match between Great Britain and New Zealand in the spring of 1939. Later developments included a zoo and miniature railway.

In 1955 the then mayor of Brighton, Walter Dudeney, opened Brighton Sports Arena as a new athletics arena hosting various sporting activities and events. The arena was upgraded over the years, with lighting added and additional squash courts. In 1980 Steve Ovett opened an all-weather running track, which was resurfaced in 1997. In 1999 the stadium became the temporary home of Brighton & Hove Albion F.C.

== Use by Brighton & Hove Albion F.C. ==
The club's original stadium, the Goldstone Ground, had been sold for commercial redevelopment in 1997. This resulted in the team playing their home matches for two seasons at Gillingham's Priestfield Stadium, over 70 miles (110 km) from Brighton, before moving to Withdean Stadium. The only other local option for Albion had been to play at Sussex CCC's County Cricket Ground, Hove.

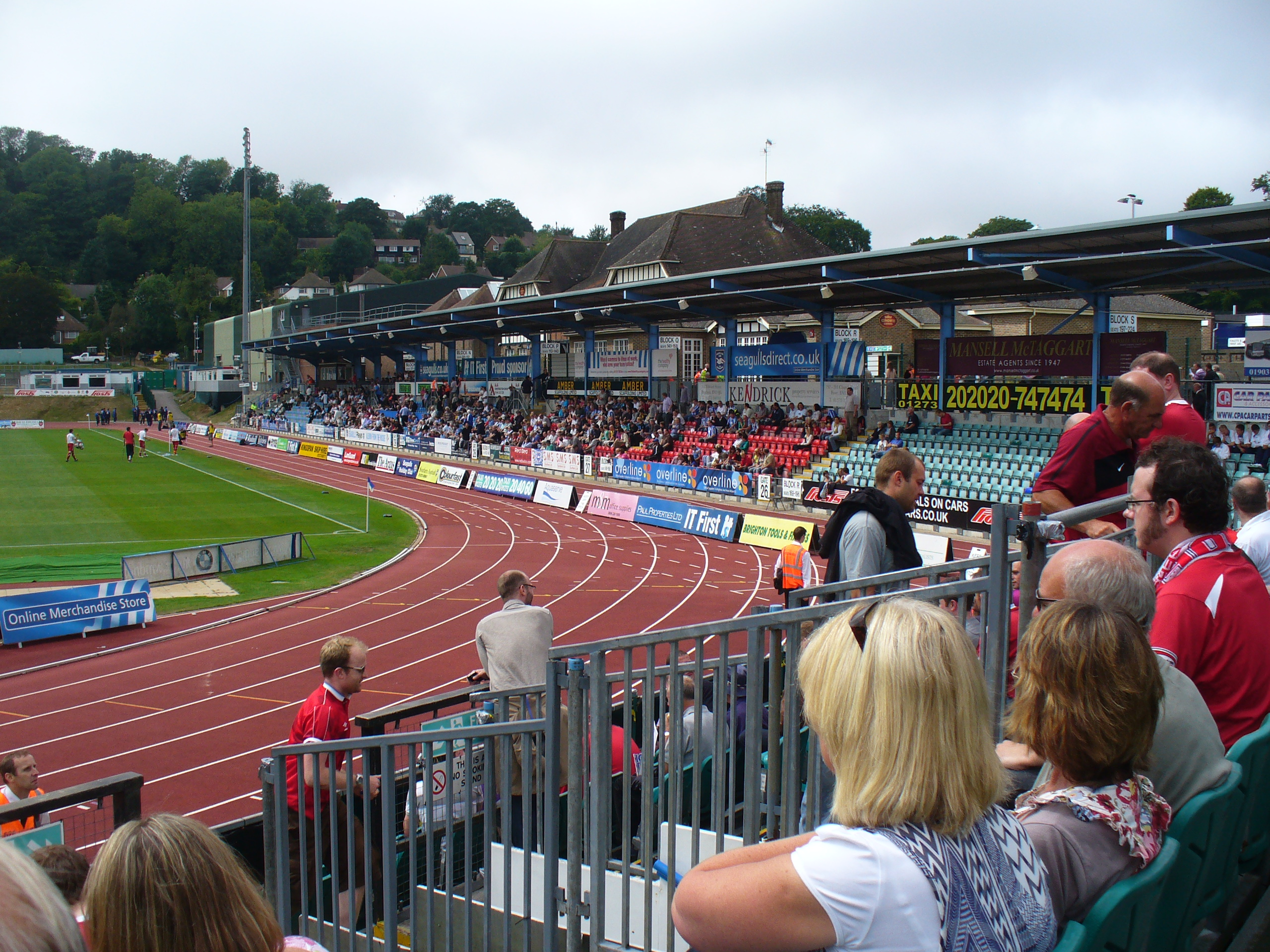
North Stand in the distance, in the foreground a temporary stand that has since been removed

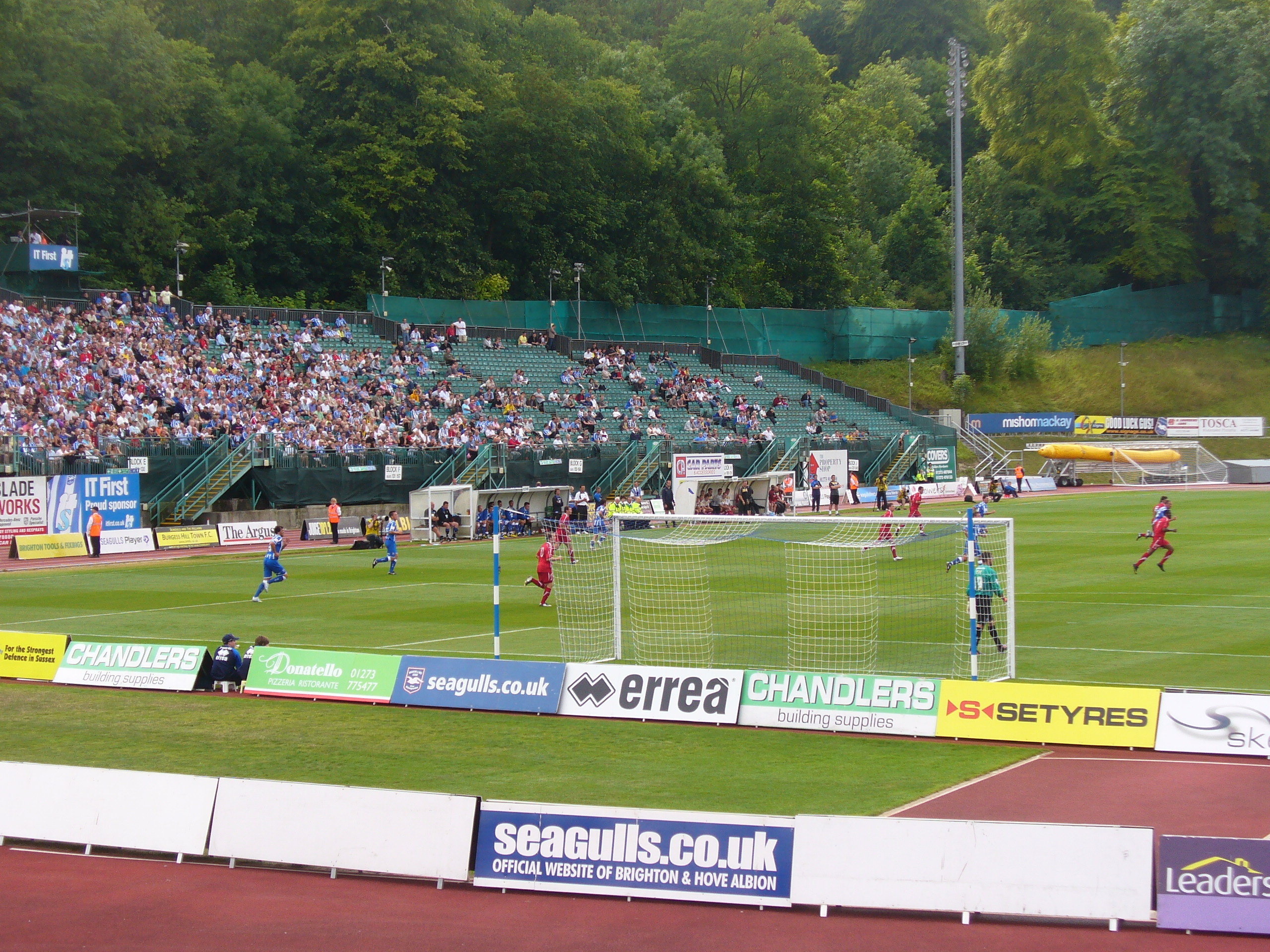
South Stand which existed while it was used by Brighton & Hove Albion F.C.

Withdean Stadium was voted the fourth worst football stadium in the UK by The Observer in 2004. The temporary nature of the stadium was obvious - the stadium was primarily used for athletics; there was a single permanent stand along the north side, while the other stands were assembled from scaffolding, some of which also served as temporary seating at the Open Championship golf tournament. The largest was the South Stand, running the entire length of the pitch. The east end of the pitch contained two medium-sized and one small stand. One of the larger stands here was designated as the family stand. The West Stand was the designated away stand. Changing and hospitality facilities were provided with portable cabins placed haphazardly around the site, and there was very limited on-site car parking.

There was considerable opposition in the local neighbourhood to allowing the football club to use the stadium. After some unique concessions were made, the club was allowed to move into Withdean in 1999. Amplified music was banned during football matches (except for the traditional "Sussex by the Sea"), and matchday parking restrictions were imposed within a one-mile radius of the ground. After a year, the music restrictions were eased, but the parking limitations continued in force. The price of each match ticket also included a public transport voucher allowing free bus or rail travel throughout the Brighton and Hove area on match day.

For Albion's match against Sheffield United on 2 October 2004 the stadium was temporarily renamed Palookaville as it hosted the launch party for Fatboy Slim's album of the same name. The album was released on Skint Records, then the club's shirt sponsor, and for that match the team wore shirts bearing the name Palookaville instead of Skint. The name Palookaville was also considered humorously appropriate by fans because it reflected the inadequacy of the club's temporary home.

Additional seating was added at the East and West Ends of the ground in November 2005. The club played their last game at Withdean on Saturday 30 April 2011 against Huddersfield Town.

Since the club has moved out, the temporary seating and other structures have been removed with only the original North Stand remaining, with seating for around 1,300.

== Withdean Sports Complex ==
Today the Stadium is part of the Withdean Sports Complex leisure centre owned by Brighton and Hove City Council and operated by Freedom Leisure. Facilities include squash and tennis courts, a gym and rock climbing wall.
