= 2010–11 Yeovil Town F.C. season =

Yeovil Town
2010–11 season
- Chairman: John Fry
- Manager: Terry Skiverton
- Stadium: Huish Park
- League One: 14th
- FA Cup: Second Round
- League Cup: First Round
- FL Trophy: First Round
- Top goalscorer: League: Dean Bowditch (15); All: Dean Bowditch (15)
- Highest home attendance: 6,281 (2 April vs. Bristol Rovers, League One)
- Lowest home attendance: 2,954 (31 August vs. Exeter City, Football League Trophy)
- Average home league attendance: 4,291
Home colours	Away colours

The 2010–11 Yeovil Town F.C. season was Yeovil Town's 8th season in the Football League and their sixth consecutive season in League One finishing in their second highest ever position of 14th with 59 points.

== Key events ==
- 13 May:The club announces Aidan Downes, Andre McCollin, Scott Murray and Richard Martin will be released; Danny Hutchins has been transfer listed. Asked to re-sign are: Dean Bowditch, Terrell Forbes, Jean-Paul Kalala, Keiran Murtagh, Nathan Smith and Gavin Tomlin.
- 20 May:Luke Ayling it is confirmed has signed a two-year contract next season linking up with the squad on 1 July after having been released by Arsenal.
- 21 May:Andy Williams agrees a deal to sign for the club on a two-year deal after rejecting terms at Bristol Rovers.
- 26 May:Terrell Forbes rejects contract offer and instead links up with ex-boss Russell Slade at Leyton Orient.
- 16 June:The club announces that Bowditch, Smith and Tomlin have verbally agreed to re-sign; Kalala and Murtagh will link up for pre-season training.
- 22 June:Dean Bowditch officially signs to the team.
- 23 June:Nathan Smith has officially re-signed.
- 30 June:Gavin Tomlin despite verbally agreeing a deal with the club rejects terms and signs for League One newcomers Dagenham & Redbridge on a three-year deal. Keiran Murtagh also leaves the club for Wycombe Wanderers after failing to agree a deal with Yeovil.
- 1 July:Luke Freeman signs on a six-month loan deal from Arsenal.
- 2 July:Ed Upson signs for the clubs on a two-year deal after being released from Ipswich Town.
- 16 July:Jean-Paul Kalala signs a new one-year contract and the club agree a deal to sign Paul Huntington on a two-year deal.
- 24 July:Darren Way's benefit match against Manchester United XI leads to a 3–2 win for Yeovil.
- 27 July:Millwall goalkeeper John Sullivan signs a one-month loan deal.
- 28 July:Watford defender/midfielder Rob Kiernan signs on a one-month loan deal.
- 29 July:Former Southend United striker Craig Calver signs a one-year deal with the club.
- 30 July:Former Brighton & Hove Albion defender Adam Virgo signs a one-year contract and Manchester United Winger Cameron Stewart signs on 6-month loan deal.
- 10 August:Former Yeovil striker Adam Stansfield dies of colorectal cancer at the age of just 31.
- 20 August:Yeovil sign former Watford trainee Billy Gibson on a six-month contract.
- 27 August:Welsh midfielders Owain Tudur Jones and Shaun MacDonald sign on loan from Norwich City and Swansea City respectively.
- 9 September:Gavin Williams also resigns on loan from Bristol City after a contribution to his wages made by three local businessmen.
- 17 September:After goalkeeper John Sullivan suffers an injury, Bristol City shot-stopper Stephen Henderson signs on a short-term loan.
- 23 September:Record appearance holder Len Harris passes away at the age of 73, he had a 14-year spell with The Glovers from 1958 to 1973, making 691 appearances in total.
- 1 October:Rob Kiernan returns to Watford early after failing to make an impact in his loan spell.
- 12 October:Shaun MacDonald makes his international debut for Wales.
- 15 October:Former managers Malcolm Allison, 83, and Colin Lippiatt, 68, pass away.
- 19 October:Manchester United winger Cameron Stewart also returns after a lack of first team appearances.
- 1 November:After suffering concussion in the Swindon Town match goalkeeper Stephen Henderson returns to Bristol City one game early.
- 13 November:The contract of Danny Hutchins is terminated by 'mutual consent' with immediate effect.
- 15 November:Chelsea reserve team striker Adam Phillip signs on a month loan.
- 22 November:Northern Irish international Ivan Sproule signs on a month loan deal until 19 December from Bristol City.
- 23 November:Luke Freeman returns early to Arsenal after suffering a persistent back injury.
- 25 November:Former England youth international defender Tom Parkes signs on loan from Leicester City until 3 January 2011.
- 27 November:Yeovil's F.A. Cup second-round game at Hartlepool United is postponed due to a frozen pitch.
- 4 December:The home game against Peterborough United is postponed due to a frozen pitch.
- 7 December:The F.A. Cup second round is postponed for the second time again due to a frozen pitch.
- 18 December:The Carlisle United home game is also postponed due to heavy snow in the local area.
- 24 December:Both the Boxing day home game against Brentford and the away trip to Sheffield Wednesday are postponed for a frozen pitch and burst under-soil heating pipes respectively.
- 28 December:Player goalkeeper coach Ben Roberts leaves the club for a post at Charlton Athletic.
- 31 December:Yeovil appoint Jon Sheffield as a replacement goalkeeper coach for the departing Roberts, and also reveal a triple signing Max Ehmer and Paul Wotton on one-month loans from QPR and Southampton respectively and also re-signing goalkeeper Richard Martin on a 'short term' contract.
- 4 January:Yeovil complete the double signing of loan goalkeeper Stephen Henderson, and Bath City midfielder Alex Russell.

== Playing staff ==
=== First team ===
- Statistics include only League, FA Cup and League Cup appearances and goals, as of the end of the season.
- Age given is at the start of Yeovil's first match of the season (7 August 2010).

No.	Name	Nat.	Place of birth	Date of birth	Position	Club apps.	Club goals	Int. caps	Int. goals	Previous club	Date joined	Notes
2	Craig Alcock	(England)	Truro	8 December 1987 (aged 22)	DF	121	3	–	–	Trainee	16 June 2006
3	Nathan Jones	(Wales)	Rhondda	28 May 1973 (aged 37)	DF	188	2	–	–	Brighton & Hove Albion	28 June 2005
4	Stefan Stam	(Netherlands)	Alkmaar	14 September 1979 (aged 30)	DF	23	1	–	–	Oldham Athletic	1 July 2009	on loan at Hereford United
5	Paul Huntington	(England)	Carlisle	17 September 1987 (aged 22)	DF	43	4	–	–	Stockport County	16 July 2010	Captain
6	Nathan Smith	(England)	Enfield	11 January 1987 (aged 23)	DF	119	1	–	–	Potters Bar Town	23 March 2008
7	Andy Williams	(England)	Hereford	14 August 1986 (aged 23)	MF, FW	40	8	–	–	Bristol Rovers	1 July 2010
8	Luke Ayling	(England)	Lambeth	25 August 1991 (aged 18)	DF, MF	44	0	–	–	Arsenal	17 March 2010
9	Sam Williams	(England)	Greenwich	9 June 1987 (aged 23)	FW	77	6	–	–	Aston Villa	21 July 2009
10	Dean Bowditch	(England)	Bishop's Stortford	15 June 1986 (aged 24)	FW	75	25	–	–	Ipswich Town	30 July 2009
11	Andy Welsh	(England)	Manchester	24 November 1983 (aged 26)	MF	120	7	–	–	Blackpool	3 September 2008
13	Stephen Henderson	(Republic of Ireland)	Dublin	2 May 1988 (aged 22)	GK	33	0	–	–	Bristol City	3 January 2011	on loan from Bristol City
14	Max Ehmer	(Germany)	Frankfurt	3 February 1992 (aged 18)	DF, MF	27	0	–	–	Queens Park Rangers	1 January 2011	on loan from Queens Park Rangers
15	Alex Russell	(England)	Crosby	17 March 1973 (aged 37)	MF	14	0	–	–	Bath City	4 January 2011
16	Ed Upson	(England)	Bury St Edmunds	21 November 1989 (aged 20)	MF	24	1	–	–	Ipswich Town	2 July 2010
17	Craig Calver	(England)	Cambridge	20 January 1991 (aged 19)	FW	6	0	–	–	AFC Sudbury	29 July 2010	on loan at Braintree Town
18	Andrew Tutte	(England)	Liverpool	21 September 1990 (aged 19)	MF	15	2	–	–	Manchester City	31 January 2011	on loan from Manchester City
19	Adam Virgo	(Scotland)	(England) Brighton	25 January 1983 (aged 27)	DF	36	5	–	–	Brighton & Hove Albion	30 July 2010
20	Paul Wotton	(England)	Plymouth	17 August 1977 (aged 33)	MF, DF	23	2	–	–	Southampton	1 January 2011
22	Martin Gritton	(Scotland)	Glasgow	1 June 1978 (aged 32)	FW	6	0	–	–	Chester	22 March 2011
23	Billy Gibson	(England)	Havering	30 September 1990 (aged 19)	MF	5	0	–	–	Watford	20 August 2010
24	Shaun MacDonald	(Wales)	Swansea	17 June 1988 (aged 22)	MF	63	9	1	0	Swansea City	17 March 2011	on loan from Swansea City
25	Danny Fitzsimons	(Republic of Ireland)	(England) Southwark	13 January 1991 (aged 19)	DF	0	0	–	–	Queens Park Rangers	28 January 2011
26	Gareth Stewart	(England)	Preston	3 February 1980 (aged 30)	GK	0	0	–	–	Welling United	23 March 2011
29	Jonathan Obika	(England)	Enfield	12 September 1990 (aged 19)	FW	46	14	–	–	Tottenham Hotspur	17 March 2011	on loan from Tottenham Hotspur
Players who appeared in Yeovil Town's squad but finished the season not playing for Yeovil:
	Rob Kiernan	(Republic of Ireland)	(England) Watford	13 January 1991 (aged 19)	DF, MF	3	0	–	–	Watford	28 July 2010	on loan from Watford
	Cameron Stewart	(England)	Manchester	8 April 1991 (aged 19)	MF	6	0	–	–	Manchester United	30 July 2010	on loan from Manchester United
	Danny Hutchins	(England)	Northolt	23 September 1989 (aged 20)	DF, MF	18	0	–	–	Tottenham Hotspur	3 March 2009
	Luke Freeman	(England)	Dartford	22 March 1992 (aged 18)	FW	15	2	–	–	Arsenal	1 July 2010	on loan from Arsenal
	Owain Tudur Jones	(Wales)	Bangor	15 October 1984 (aged 25)	MF	22	2	6	0	Norwich City	27 August 2010	on loan from Norwich City
	Gavin Williams	(Wales)	Merthyr Tydfil	20 July 1980 (aged 30)	MF	129	28	2	0	Bristol City	9 September 2010	on loan from Bristol City
	Adam Phillip	(England)	Carshalton	19 June 1991 (aged 19)	FW	3	0	–	–	Chelsea	15 November 2010	on loan from Chelsea
	Ivan Sproule	(Northern Ireland)	Castlederg	18 February 1981 (aged 29)	MF	2	0	11	1	Bristol City	22 November 2010	on loan from Bristol City
	Ben Roberts	(England)	Bishop Auckland	22 June 1975 (aged 35)	GK	1	0	–	–	Derry City	25 June 2009
	John Sullivan	(England)	Sompting	8 March 1988 (aged 22)	GK	17	0	–	–	Millwall	27 July 2010	on loan from Millwall
	Jean-Paul Kalala	(Democratic Republic of the Congo)	Lubumbashi	16 February 1982 (aged 28)	MF	95	2	7	0	Oldham Athletic	20 August 2009
	Tom Parkes	(England)	Mansfield	15 January 1992 (aged 18)	DF	2	0	–	–	Leicester City	25 November 2010	on loan from Leicester City
	Richard Martin	(England)	Chelmsford	1 September 1987 (aged 22)	GK	5	0	–	–	Crawley Town	31 December 2010
	Antonio German	(England)	Wembley	26 December 1991 (aged 18)	FW	5	0	–	–	Queens Park Rangers	10 February 2011	on loan from Queens Park Rangers
	Oli Johnson	(England)	Wakefield	6 November 1987 (aged 22)	FW	18	3	–	–	Norwich City	14 January 2011	on loan from Norwich City

=== Youth team scholars ===
Note: Flags indicate national team as defined under FIFA eligibility rules; some limited exceptions apply. Players may hold more than one non-FIFA nationality.

No.	Pos.	Nation	Player
27	FW	ENG	Robert Clowes
28	DF	WAL	Josh Doyle
30	FW	ENG	Lloyd Matthews
31	DF	WAL	Rhys Baggridge
—	GK	ENG	Steve Boore
—	DF	ENG	Joe Grimstead

No.	Pos.	Nation	Player
—	MF	ENG	Lewis Clarke
—	MF	ENG	Will Gordon
—	MF	ENG	Jonny Kaye
—	FW	ENG	Adam Cleary
—	FW	ENG	Tyler Sheppard

== Transfers ==
=== In ===
Date	Name	From	Fee	Ref
1 July 2010	Luke Ayling	Arsenal	Free (released)	
1 July 2010	Andy Williams	Bristol Rovers	Free (released)	
2 July 2010	Ed Upson	Ipswich Town	Free (released)	
16 July 2010	Paul Huntington	Stockport County	Free (released)	
29 July 2010	Craig Calver	AFC Sudbury	Free	
30 July 2010	Adam Virgo	Brighton & Hove Albion	Free (released)	
20 August 2010	Billy Gibson	Watford	Free (released)	
31 December 2010	Richard Martin	Crawley Town	Free (released)	
3 January 2011	Alex Russell	Bath City	Free	
28 January 2011	Paul Wotton	Southampton	Free	
9 February 2011	Danny Fitzsimons	Queens Park Rangers	Free (released)	
22 March 2011	Martin Gritton	Chester	Free	
23 March 2011	Gareth Stewart	Welling United	Free (released)	

=== Out ===
Date	Name	To	Fee	Ref
13 November 2010	Danny Hutchins	Dunstable Town	Contract terminated by mutual consent	
29 December 2010	Ben Roberts	Charlton Athletic	Contract terminated by mutual consent	
31 January 2011	Jean-Paul Kalala	Bristol Rovers	Free	
21 March 2011	Richard Martin	Puerto Rico Islanders	Contract terminated by mutual consent	
30 June 2011	Craig Calver	Bishop's Stortford	Released	
30 June 2011	Danny Fitzsimons	Histon	Released	
30 June 2011	Martin Gritton	Stockport County	Released	
30 June 2011	Stefan Stam	Hereford United	Released	
30 June 2011	Sam Williams	Dagenham & Redbridge	Released	
30 June 2011	Dean Bowditch	Milton Keynes Dons	Rejected new contract	
30 June 2011	Alex Russell	Bath City	Rejected new contract	
30 June 2011	Nathan Smith	Chesterfield	Rejected new contract	
30 June 2011	Adam Virgo	Bristol Rovers	Rejected new contract	
30 June 2011	Andy Welsh	Carlisle United	Rejected new contract	

=== Loan in ===
Date	Name	From	End date	Ref
1 July 2010	Luke Freeman	Arsenal	23 November 2010	
27 July 2010	John Sullivan	Millwall	3 January 2011	
28 July 2010	Rob Kiernan	Watford	1 October 2010	
30 July 2010	Cameron Stewart	Manchester United	19 October 2010	
27 August 2010	Owain Tudur Jones	Norwich City	27 November 2010	
27 August 2010	Shaun MacDonald	Swansea City	3 January 2011	
9 September 2010	Gavin Williams	Bristol City	10 December 2010	
17 September 2010	Stephen Henderson	Bristol City	1 November 2010	
15 November 2010	Adam Phillip	Chelsea	16 December 2010	
22 November 2010	Ivan Sproule	Bristol City	19 December 2010	
25 November 2010	Tom Parkes	Leicester City	3 January 2011	
1 January 2011	Paul Wotton	Southampton	28 January 2011	
1 January 2011	Max Ehmer	Queens Park Rangers	7 May 2011	
4 January 2011	Stephen Henderson	Bristol City	7 May 2011	
14 January 2011	Oli Johnson	Norwich City	17 April 2011	
31 January 2011	Andrew Tutte	Manchester City	7 May 2011	
10 February 2011	Antonio German	Queens Park Rangers	24 March 2011	
17 March 2011	Jonathan Obika	Tottenham Hotspur	7 May 2011	
17 March 2011	Shaun MacDonald	Swansea City	7 May 2011	

=== Loan out ===
Date	Name	To	End date	Ref
17 January 2011	Robert Clowes	Sherborne Town	17 February 2011	
17 January 2011	Lewis Clarke	Sherborne Town	17 February 2011	
14 March 2011	Craig Calver	Braintree Town	7 May 2011	
21 March 2011	Lewis Clarke	Weymouth	25 April 2011	
21 March 2011	Stefan Stam	Hereford United	7 May 2011	

== Match results ==
League positions are sourced from Statto, while the remaining contents of each table are sourced from the references in the "Ref" column.

=== League One ===
Date	League position	Opponents	Venue	Result	Score F–A	Scorers	Attendance	Ref
7 August 2010	8th	Leyton Orient	H	W	2–1	Bowditch, Freeman	4,126	
14 August 2010	11th	Bristol Rovers	A	L	1–2	Virgo	6,438	
21 August 2010	15th	Hartlepool United	H	L	0–2		3,537	
28 August 2010	16th	Oldham Athletic	A	D	0–0		4,180	
4 September 2010	22nd	Notts County	A	L	0–4		6,288	
11 September 2010	14th	Tranmere Rovers	H	W	3–1	Bowditch, Welsh, Huntington	3,364	
21 September 2010	17th	Huddersfield Town	A	L	2–4	Bowditch, Huntington	13,479	
25 September 2010	20th	Exeter City	H	L	1–3	S. Williams	5,886	
28 September 2010	21st	Southampton	H	D	1–1	Virgo (pen)	5,854	
2 October 2010	19th	Walsall	A	W	1–0	Virgo	3,172	
9 October 2010	16th	Rochdale	A	W	1–0	Freeman	3,150	
16 October 2010	18th	Sheffield Wednesday	H	L	0–2		5,927	
23 October 2010	20th	Brighton & Hove Albion	A	L	0–2		7,523	
30 October 2010	22nd	Swindon Town	H	D	3–3	G. Williams, Bowditch (2)	4,671	
2 November 2010	22nd	MK Dons	A	L	2–3	Bowditch, Virgo	7,281	
13 November 2010	23rd	Dagenham & Redbridge	H	L	1–3	A. Williams	3,586	
20 November 2010	23rd	Charlton Athletic	A	L	2–3	A. Williams, Doherty (og)	15,184	
23 November 2010	23rd	AFC Bournemouth	A	L	0–2		6,465	
11 December 2010	23rd	Colchester United	A	D	0–0		3,748	
1 January 2011	23rd	Plymouth Argyle	A	D	0–0		9,720	
3 January 2011	22nd	MK Dons	H	W	1–0	Huntington	3,508	
8 January 2011	21st	Brentford	H	W	2–0	Huntington, A. Williams	3,688	
15 January 2011	21st	Swindon Town	A	W	1–0	Bowditch	7,950	
22 January 2011	22nd	Rochdale	H	L	0–1		3,711	
25 January 2011	21st	Sheffield Wednesday	A	D	2–2	Bowditch, Huntington	16,618	
29 January 2011	21st	Brentford	A	W	2–1	Johnson, Wotton	4,753	
1 February 2011	17th	Plymouth Argyle	H	W	1–0	A. Williams	5,208	
5 February 2011	17th	Charlton Athletic	H	L	0–1		4,651	
12 February 2011	18th	Dagenham & Redbridge	A	L	1–2	Johnson	2,119	
15 February 2011	20th	Peterborough United	H	L	0–2		3,351	
26 February 2011	19th	Tranmere Rovers	A	W	1–0	Johnson	8,016	
1 March 2011	19th	Brighton & Hove Albion	H	L	0–1		3,832	
5 March 2011	19th	Huddersfield Town	H	D	1–1	A. Williams	3,620	
8 March 2011	19th	Southampton	A	L	0–3		18,623	
12 March 2011	19th	Walsall	H	D	1–1	A. Williams	3,737	
19 March 2011	19th	Exeter City	A	W	3–2	S. Williams, Bowditch (2)	5,841	
26 March 2011	17th	Leyton Orient	A	W	5–1	MacDonald (3), Welsh, Bowditch	4,258	
29 March 2011	16th	Carlisle United	H	W	1–0	Obika	3,331	
2 April 2011	17th	Bristol Rovers	H	L	0–1		6,281	
9 April 2011	17th	Hartlepool United	A	L	1–3	Obika	2,834	
12 April 2011	17th	Notts County	H	W	2–1	Bowditch (2)	3,533	
16 April 2011	17th	Oldham Athletic	H	D	1–1	Welsh	3,350	
23 April 2011	17th	AFC Bournemouth	H	D	2–2	Virgo (pen), MacDonald	6,150	
25 April 2011	18th	Peterborough United	A	D	2–2	Wotton (pen), Tutte	6,489	
30 April 2011	17th	Colchester United	H	W	4–2	Alcock, Tutte, Bowditch, Welsh	3,797	
7 May 2011	14th	Carlisle United	A	W	2–0	Obika, Bowditch	6,473	

==== League table ====
Pos	Team	Pld	W	D	L	GF	GA	GD	Pts
12	Carlisle United	46	16	11	19	60	62	−2	59
13	Charlton Athletic	46	15	14	17	62	66	−4	59
14	Yeovil Town	46	16	11	19	56	66	−10	59
15	Sheffield Wednesday	46	16	10	20	67	67	0	58
16	Hartlepool United	46	15	12	19	47	65	−18	57

Updated to match(es) played on 2 May 2011. Source: BBC
Rules for classification: 1) points; 2) goal difference; 3) number of goals scored.

=== FA Cup ===
Round	Date	Opponents	Venue	Result	Score F–A	Scorers	Attendance	Ref
First round	6 November 2010	Rushden & Diamonds	A	W	1–0	A. Williams	1,666	
Second round	14 December 2010	Hartlepool United	A	L	2–4	A. Williams, Upson	1,914	

=== League Cup ===
Round	Date	Opponents	Venue	Result	Score F–A	Scorers	Attendance	Ref
First round	10 August 2010	Crystal Palace	H	L	0–1		3,720	

=== Football League Trophy ===
Round	Date	Opponents	Venue	Result	Score F–A	Scorers	Attendance	Ref
First round	31 August 2010	Exeter City	H	L	1–3	Welsh	2,954	

== Statistics ==
=== Player details ===
Numbers in parentheses denote appearances as substitute.

No.	Position	Nationality	Name	Apps	Goals	Apps	Goals	Apps	Goals	Apps	Goals	Apps	Goals	Yellow card	Red card
No.	Position	Nationality	Name	League		FA Cup		League Cup		FL Trophy		Total		Discipline	
1	Goalkeeper	England	John Sullivan	13	0	2	0	1	0	1	0	17	0	0	0
1	Goalkeeper	England	Richard Martin	0	0	0	0	0	0	0	0	0	0	0	0
2	Defender	England	Craig Alcock	19 (7)	1	1	0	1	0	1	0	22 (7)	1	2	0
3	Defender	Wales	Nathan Jones	7 (1)	0	2	0	1	0	0	0	10 (1)	0	1	0
4	Defender	Netherlands	Stefan Stam	3	0	0	0	0	0	0	0	3	0	0	0
5	Defender	England	Paul Huntington	40	4	1	0	1	0	1	0	43	4	6	2
6	Defender	England	Nathan Smith	35 (5)	0	0	0	0 (1)	0	1	0	36 (6)	0	7	0
7	Midfielder	England	Andy Williams	27 (10)	6	2	2	1	0	0	0	30 (10)	8	3	0
8	Defender	England	Luke Ayling	31 (6)	0	1	0	1	0	0 (1)	0	33 (7)	0	13	2
9	Forward	England	Sam Williams	23 (13)	2	1 (1)	0	1	0	1	0	26 (14)	2	4	1
10	Forward	England	Dean Bowditch	40 (1)	15	2	0	1	0	1	0	44 (1)	15	4	0
11	Midfielder	England	Andy Welsh	31 (3)	4	2	0	0	0	1	1	34 (3)	5	4	0
12	Defender	England	Danny Hutchins	0	0	0	0	0	0	0	0	0	0	0	0
12	Defender	England	Tom Parkes	0 (1)	0	1	0	0	0	0	0	1 (1)	0	1	0
12	Forward	England	Oli Johnson	16 (1)	3	0	0	0	0	0	0	16 (1)	3	1	0
13	Goalkeeper	Ireland	Stephen Henderson	33	0	0	0	0	0	0	0	33	0	1	0
14	Defender	Ireland	Rob Kiernan	1 (2)	0	0	0	0	0	0	0	1 (2)	0	0	0
14	Defender	Germany	Max Ehmer	26 (1)	0	0	0	0	0	0	0	0	0	3	0
15	Midfielder	England	Cameron Stewart	1 (4)	0	0	0	0	0	1	0	2 (4)	0	0	0
15	Midfielder	England	Alex Russell	2 (12)	0	0	0	0	0	0	0	2 (12)	0	0	0
16	Midfielder	England	Ed Upson	15 (8)	0	1	1	0	0	0	0	16 (8)	1	4	0
17	Forward	England	Craig Calver	0 (5)	0	0 (1)	0	0	0	0	0	0 (6)	0	0	0
18	Forward	England	Luke Freeman	5 (8)	2	0	0	1	0	0 (1)	0	6 (9)	2	2	0
18	Midfielder	England	Andrew Tutte	12 (3)	2	0	0	0	0	0	0	12 (3)	2	0	0
19	Defender	Scotland	Adam Virgo	28 (5)	5	1	0	1	0	1	0	31 (5)	5	6	1
20	Midfielder	Wales	Owain Tudur Jones	12 (2)	1	0	0	1	0	1	0	14 (2)	1	4	0
20	Midfielder	England	Paul Wotton	23	2	0	0	0	0	0	0	23	2	6	0
21	Midfielder	DR Congo	Jean-Paul Kalala	15	0	2	0	1	0	1	0	19	0	3	2
21	Forward	England	Antonio German	0 (4)	0	0	0	0	0	0	0	0 (4)	0	0	0
22	Goalkeeper	England	Ben Roberts	0 (1)	0	0	0	0	0	0	0	0 (1)	0	0	0
22	Forward	Scotland	Martin Gritton	0 (2)	0	0	0	0	0	0	0	0 (2)	0	0	0
23	Midfielder	England	Billy Gibson	0 (4)	0	0 (1)	0	0	0	0	0	0 (5)	0	0	0
24	Midfielder	Wales	Gavin Williams	11 (1)	1	0	0	0	0	0	0	11 (1)	1	4	0
24	Midfielder	Wales	Shaun MacDonald	26	4	2	0	0	0	0	0	28	4	1	0
25	Defender	Ireland	Danny Fitzsimons	0	0	0	0	0	0	0	0	0	0	0	0
26	Goalkeeper	England	Gareth Stewart	0	0	0	0	0	0	0	0	0	0	0	0
27	Forward	England	Robert Clowes	0	0	0	0	0	0	0	0	0	0	0	0
28	Defender	Wales	Joshua Doyle	0	0	0	0	0	0	0	0	0	0	0	0
29	Midfielder	Northern Ireland	Ivan Sproule	2	0	0	0	0	0	0	0	2	0	1	0
29	Forward	England	Jonathan Obika	11	3	0	0	0	0	0	0	11	3	1	0
30	Forward	England	Lloyd Matthews	0	0	0	0	0	0	0	0	0	0	0	0
31	Defender	Wales	Rhys Baggridge	0	0	0	0	0	0	0	0	0	0	0	0

== Awards ==
=== End-of-season awards ===
Green & White Supporters Club Player of the Season

- Winner: Stephen Henderson
- Runner-up: Paul Huntington

Western Gazette Player of the Season

- Winner: Stephen Henderson

Cary Glovers Player of the Season

- Winner: Stephen Henderson

Away Travel Club Player of the Season

- Winner: Stephen Henderson
- Runner-up: Paul Huntington

Bobby Hamilton Young Player Award

- Winner: Luke Ayling

Andy Stone Memorial Trophy for Top Goalscorer

- Winner: Dean Bowditch

Disabled Supporters Association Player of the Season

- Winner: Andy Welsh

Disabled Supporters Association Young Player of the Season

- Winner: Luke Ayling

== See also ==
- 2010–11 in English football
- List of Yeovil Town F.C. seasons
