= 2001–02 Huddersfield Town A.F.C. season =

Huddersfield Town
2001–02 season
- Chairman: Barry Rubery
- Manager: Lou Macari
- Stadium: Kirklees Stadium
- Division Two: 6th
- Play-offs: Semi-finals (eliminated by Brentford)
- FA Cup: Second round (eliminated by Mansfield Town)
- League Cup: First round (eliminated by Rochdale)
- League Trophy: Area Final (eliminated by Blackpool)
- Top goalscorer: League: Leon Knight (16); All: Leon Knight (17)
- Highest home attendance: 16,523 vs Brentford (28 April 2002)
- Lowest home attendance: 3,570 vs Halifax Town (16 October 2001)
- Biggest win: 5–1 vs Wrexham (27 October 2001)
- Biggest defeat: 0–4 vs Mansfield Town (8 December 2001)
Home colours	Away colours	Third colours

Huddersfield Town's 2001–02 campaign was their first competitive campaign in the third tier since the 1994–95 season. Huddersfield finished 6th that season, before losing in the play-offs to 3rd place Brentford, who Town beat in the play-off semi-finals in the 1994–95 season.

== Squad at the start of the season ==
Note: Flags indicate national team as defined under FIFA eligibility rules; some limited exceptions apply. Players may hold more than one non-FIFA nationality.

No.	Pos.	Nation	Player
2	DF	WAL	Steve Jenkins
3	DF	ENG	Gareth Evans
4	DF	ENG	Craig Armstrong
5	DF	ENG	Chris Lucketti
8	MF	ENG	Kenny Irons
9	FW	ENG	Martin Smith
11	FW	SUR	Clyde Wijnhard
12	DF	ENG	Kevin Gray
13	GK	WAL	Martyn Margetson
16	FW	GRN	Delroy Facey
17	MF	ENG	Simon Baldry
18	FW	SCO	Chris Hay

No.	Pos.	Nation	Player
20	DF	IRL	Thomas Heary
21	DF	ENG	Jon Dyson
22	MF	ENG	Chris Beech
23	MF	ENG	Chris Holland
24	MF	ENG	Danny Schofield
26	DF	ENG	Adie Moses
29	MF	USA	John Thorrington
31	FW	SCO	Paul Macari
32	FW	ENG	Andy Booth
33	MF	IRL	Dwayne Mattis
34	MF	ENG	Michael Senior

== Review ==
Macari remained in charge for the 2001–02 season. At the start of the season he sold Chris Lucketti to Preston North End in a £750,000 deal, after 76 appearances for Town. Macari promoted the then 18-year-old Nathan Clarke to the first team, who would go on to be a mainstay at the heart of the Terriers defence. Huddersfield had a good start to the season, with the exception of the Worthington Cup loss to Rochdale. They continued a steady progress up the table and Lou Macari was on course to send Town back up to Division 1.

As the top six challenge faded, he made a canny loan signing, gifted young striker Leon Knight (from Chelsea). He scored 16 league goals in 31 appearances and also became the only loan player to date to win the Player of the Year award. However, Knight received a red card during a league game with near neighbours Oldham Athletic and ended up missing the Play-Offs he had been largely responsible for getting the team to. Without him, Town battled well but lacked a cutting edge and ended up being defeated by Brentford at the semi-final stage.

The season also saw a good campaign in the LDV Vans Trophy. After beating Halifax Town, Wrexham, Scunthorpe United and Hull City, Town played Blackpool in a 2-leg Northern Area Final. After losing the first leg 3–1 at Bloomfield Road, Town took a 2–0 lead in the reverse at the McAlpine Stadium, the match went to extra time, but their party was spoiled by Martin Bullock's golden goal.

So, Town looked on course for automatic promotion until a run of 4 games without a win in late March and early April, only the play-offs seemed to be likely to give the promotion that Town craved. They eventually finished 6th, six behind 2nd placed Reading.

The Play-off semi-final saw Town play 3rd placed Brentford. After the first leg ended 0–0 at the McAlpine, Andy Booth gave Town an early lead in the second leg at Griffin Park, before Darren Powell and Lloyd Owusu gave Brentford their 2–1 win.

== Squad at the end of the season ==
Note: Flags indicate national team as defined under FIFA eligibility rules; some limited exceptions apply. Players may hold more than one non-FIFA nationality.

No.	Pos.	Nation	Player
2	DF	WAL	Steve Jenkins
3	DF	ENG	Gareth Evans
8	MF	ENG	Kenny Irons
9	FW	ENG	Martin Smith
11	FW	SUR	Clyde Wijnhard
12	DF	ENG	Kevin Gray
13	GK	WAL	Martyn Margetson
16	FW	GRN	Delroy Facey
17	MF	ENG	Simon Baldry
18	FW	SCO	Chris Hay
20	DF	IRL	Thomas Heary
21	DF	ENG	Jon Dyson
22	MF	ENG	Chris Beech

No.	Pos.	Nation	Player
23	MF	ENG	Chris Holland
24	MF	ENG	Danny Schofield
26	DF	ENG	Adie Moses
29	MF	USA	John Thorrington
30	FW	ENG	Leon Knight (on loan from Chelsea)
31	FW	SCO	Paul Macari
32	FW	ENG	Andy Booth
33	MF	IRL	Dwayne Mattis
34	MF	ENG	Michael Senior
35	GK	RSA	Paul Evans (on loan from Leeds United)
36	DF	ENG	Nathan Clarke
37	MF	IRL	Damien Delaney (on loan from Leicester City)
38	DF	ENG	Jerel Ifil (on loan from Watford)

== Results ==
=== Division Two ===
Date	Opponents	Home/Away	Result F – A	Scorers	Attendance	League position
11 August 2001	Bournemouth	H	1–0	Irons [50]	10,137	7th
18 August 2001	Reading	A	0–1		11,915	12th
25 August 2001	Bury	H	2–0	Schofield [82, 88]	8,684	8th
27 August 2001	Peterborough United	A	2–1	Booth [52], Beech [71]	5,253	4th
2 September 2001	Wycombe Wanderers	H	2–1	Thorrington [38], Brown [70 (og)]	9,741	1st
8 September 2001	Stoke City	A	1–1	Schofield [32]	13,319	3rd
15 September 2001	Blackpool	H	2–4	Clarke [18], Thorrington [87]	10,691	6th
18 September 2001	Wigan Athletic	A	0–1		5,717	7th
22 September 2001	Cardiff City	A	2–1	Mattis [20], Schofield [56]	12,280	6th
25 September 2001	Chesterfield	H	0–0		9,399	5th
29 September 2001	Bristol City	H	1–0	Thorrington [71]	10,652	3rd
7 October 2001	Queens Park Rangers	A	2–3	Hay [33], Ben Askar [90 (og)]	10,668	7th
13 October 2001	Brighton & Hove Albion	H	1–2	Irons [74]	10,727	9th
20 October 2001	Tranmere Rovers	A	0–1		8,632	12th
23 October 2001	Northampton Town	A	3–0	Booth [30, 45, 70]	5,926	7th
27 October 2001	Wrexham	H	5–1	Thorrington [29 (pen)], Holland [48], Knight [64, 66], Booth [87]	9,888	6th
3 November 2001	Oldham Athletic	A	1–1	Schofield [23]	8,859	10th
9 November 2001	Notts County	H	2–2	Jenkins [37], Knight [63]	10,168	6th
20 November 2001	Brentford	H	1–1	Knight [56]	8,518	6th
24 November 2001	Port Vale	A	1–1	Knight [67]	5,026	7th
1 December 2001	Cambridge United	H	2–1	Hay [76], Booth [88]	9,513	7th
22 December 2001	Colchester United	A	3–3	Booth [40, 61], Schofield [59]	3,543	10th
26 December 2001	Peterborough United	H	3–1	Thorrington [34, 52], Irons [66]	11,446	8th
29 December 2001	Stoke City	H	0–0		16,041	9th
12 January 2002	Reading	H	0–1		10,775	11th
15 January 2002	Bury	A	0–0		3,462	9th
19 January 2002	Bournemouth	A	3–2	Booth [3], Hay [24], Knight [37]	5,307	9th
22 January 2002	Colchester United	H	2–1	Schofield [5, 25]	7,179	9th
26 January 2002	Queens Park Rangers	H	1–0	Booth [37]	9,433	6th
2 February 2002	Bristol City	A	1–1	Knight [90]	10,643	7th
5 February 2002	Swindon Town	A	1–0	Hay [54]	5,094	5th
9 February 2002	Tranmere Rovers	H	2–1	Armstrong [78], Wijnhard [81]	15,784	5th
16 February 2002	Brighton & Hove Albion	A	0–1		14,045	6th
23 February 2002	Blackpool	A	2–1	Knight [70, 90]	8,981	6th
2 March 2002	Wigan Athletic	H	0–0		12,844	7th
5 March 2002	Chesterfield	A	1–1	Knight [83]	4,740	7th
9 March 2002	Swindon Town	H	2–0	Irons [21], Knight [52]	9,569	6th
12 March 2002	Wycombe Wanderers	A	4–2	Knight [28, 90], Gray [36], Irons [90]	5,546	5th
16 March 2002	Cambridge United	A	1–0	Knight [64]	3,728	5th
23 March 2002	Northampton Town	H	2–0	Knight [27, 33]	10,783	5th
30 March 2002	Wrexham	A	1–1	Facey [53]	4,448	5th
1 April 2002	Oldham Athletic	H	0–0		14,343	5th
6 April 2002	Brentford	A	0–3		7,393	6th
9 April 2002	Cardiff City	H	2–2	Irons [79 (pen)], Hay [82]	11,660	6th
13 April 2002	Port Vale	H	2–1	Facey [42], Booth [65]	12,270	6th
20 April 2002	Notts County	A	1–2	Irons [83 (pen)]	15,618	6th

=== Division 2 Play-offs ===
Date	Round	Opponents	Home/Away	Result F – A	Scorers	Attendance
28 April 2002	Semi-Final 1st Leg	Brentford	H	0–0		16,523
1 May 2002	Semi-Final 2nd Leg	Brentford	A	1–2	Booth [2]	11,191: Huddersfield lost 2–1 on aggregate.

=== FA Cup ===
Date	Round	Opponents	Home/Away	Result F – A	Scorers	Attendance
17 November 2001	Round 1	Gravesend & Northfleet	H	2–1	Moses [63], Knight [90]	6,112
8 December 2001	Round 2	Mansfield Town	A	0–4		6,836

=== Worthington Cup ===
Date	Round	Opponents	Home/Away	Result F – A	Scorers	Attendance
21 August 2001	Round 1	Rochdale	H	0–1		3,995

=== LDV Vans Trophy ===
Date	Round	Opponents	Home/Away	Result F – A	Scorers	Attendance	Notes
16 October 2001	Round 1 North	Halifax Town	H	0–0 (aet: 90 mins: 0–0)		3,570	/ Penalties; Hay (penalty scored); Thorrington (penalty scored); Clarke (penalty scored); Irons (penalty scored) / 4–3 / (penalty scored) ? (penalty scored) ? (penalty scored) ? (penalty missed) Stoneman: Margetson saved (penalty missed) Smith: over crossbar
30 October 2001	Round 2 North	Wrexham	A	1–0	Holland [5]	1,725
4 December 2001	Quarter-Final North	Scunthorpe United	H	4–1	Schofield [23, 65], Hay [76], Booth [85]	3,587
8 January 2002	Semi-Final North	Hull City	A	1–0	Booth [39]	7,248
29 January 2002	Final First Leg North	Blackpool	A	1–3	Schofield [56]	4,573
12 February 2002	Final Second Leg North	Blackpool	H	2–1 (Golden goal aet: 90 mins: 2–0)	Wijnhard [5 (pen)], Schofield [33]	7,736	Huddersfield lost 4–3 on aggregate

== Appearances and goals ==
Squad No.	Name	Nationality	Position	League		FA Cup		League Cup		Football League Trophy		Play-offs		Total	
Squad No.	Name	Nationality	Position	Apps	Goals	Apps	Goals	Apps	Goals	Apps	Goals	Apps	Goals	Apps	Goals
2	Steve Jenkins	Wales	DF	40	1	1	0	1	0	4	0	1	0	47	1
3	Gareth Evans	England	DF	35	0	0	0	1	0	3	0	2	0	41	0
4	Craig Armstrong	England	MF	7 (4)	1	0	0	1	0	1 (1)	0	0	0	9 (5)	1
5	Chris Lucketti	England	DF	2	0	0	0	0	0	0	0	0	0	2	0
8	Kenny Irons	England	MF	34 (7)	7	2	0	1	0	5	0	2	0	44 (7)	7
11	Clyde Wijnhard	Suriname	FW	2 (11)	1	0	0	0	0	1 (1)	1	0	0	3 (12)	2
12	Kevin Gray	England	DF	44	1	2	0	1	0	6	0	2	0	55	1
13	Martyn Margetson	Wales	GK	46	0	2	0	1	0	6	0	2	0	57	0
16	Delroy Facey	Grenada	FW	11 (2)	2	0	0	0	0	0	0	2	0	13 (2)	2
17	Simon Baldry	England	MF	3 (1)	0	0 (1)	0	0	0	1 (1)	0	0	0	4 (3)	0
18	Chris Hay	Scotland	FW	19 (12)	5	0 (1)	0	1	0	2 (2)	1	0 (2)	0	22 (17)	6
20	Thomas Heary	Republic of Ireland	DF	21 (11)	0	2	0	1	0	6	0	2	0	32 (11)	0
21	Jon Dyson	England	DF	0	0	1	0	0	0	0	0	0	0	1	0
22	Chris Beech	England	MF	6 (3)	1	0	0	1	0	0	0	0	0	7 (3)	1
23	Chris Holland	England	MF	35 (2)	1	2	0	1	0	5 (1)	1	2	0	45 (3)	2
24	Danny Schofield	England	MF	39 (1)	8	2	0	0	0	6	4	0	0	47 (1)	12
26	Adie Moses	England	DF	13 (4)	0	1	1	0	0	3	0	1	0	18 (4)	1
29	John Thorrington	United States	MF	29 (2)	6	0	0	0 (1)	0	1	0	2	0	32 (3)	6
30	Leon Knight	England	FW	31	16	2	1	0	0	4	0	0	0	37	17
31	Paul Macari	England	FW	0 (6)	0	0	0	0 (1)	0	0 (2)	0	0	0	0 (9)	0
32	Andy Booth	England	FW	30 (6)	11	2	0	1	0	5	2	2	1	40 (6)	14
33	Dwayne Mattis	Republic of Ireland	MF	21 (8)	1	2	0	0 (1)	0	3	0	0	0	26 (9)	1
34	Michael Senior	England	MF	0	0	0	0	0	0	0 (1)	0	0	0	0 (1)	0
36	Nathan Clarke	England	DF	36	1	1	0	0	0	4	0	0	0	41	1
37	Damien Delaney	Republic of Ireland	DF	1 (1)	0	0	0	0	0	0	0	0	0	1 (1)	0
38	Jerel Ifil	England	DF	1 (1)	0	0	0	0	0	0	0	2	0	3 (1)	0
