= 2004 Football League Second Division play-off final =

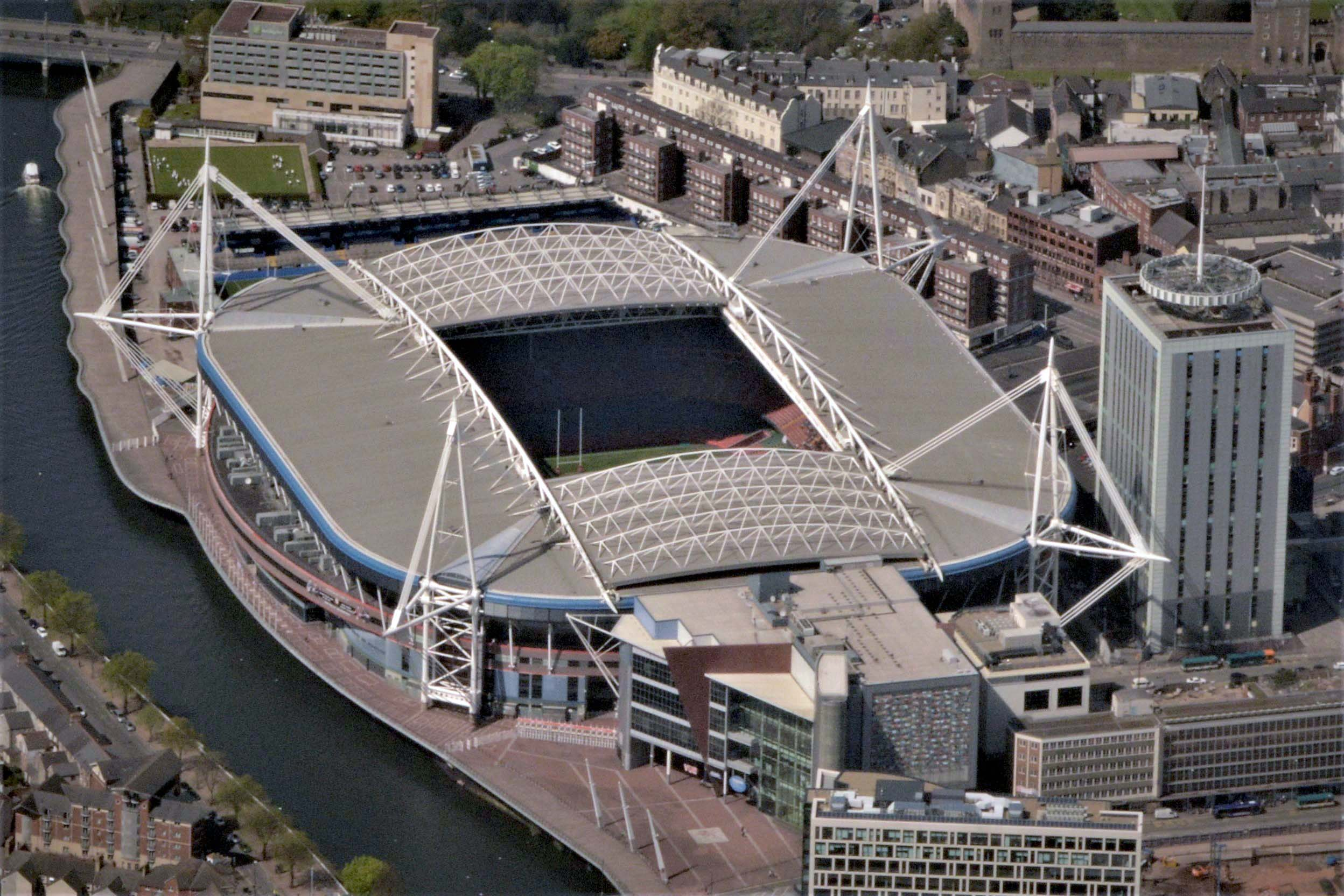
- The final took place at the Millennium Stadium.
Brighton & Hove Albion	Bristol City
1	0
- Date: 30 May 2004
- Venue: Millennium Stadium, Cardiff
- Referee: Richard Beeby
- Attendance: 65,167

The 2004 Football Second Division play-off final was an association football match which was played on 30 May 2004 at the Millennium Stadium, Cardiff, between Brighton & Hove Albion and Bristol City to determine the third and final team to gain promotion from the Football League Second Division to the Football League Championship. The top two teams of the 2003–04 Second Division season, Plymouth Argyle and Queens Park Rangers, gained automatic promotion to the Championship, while the teams placed from third to sixth place in the table took part in play-off semi-finals; the winners of these semi-finals competed for the final place for the 2004–05 season in the Championship. Brighton and Bristol defeated Swindon Town and Hartlepool United, respectively, in the semi-finals.

The final kicked off around 3 p.m. in front of a crowd of 65,167 and was refereed by Richard Beeby. The first half ended scoreless: Brian Tinnion's free kick was kept out by Brighton's goalkeeper Ben Roberts, and after Tommy Doherty fouled Nathan Jones in the 43rd minute, Leon Knight's curling free kick from 20 yards (18 metres) struck the Bristol City crossbar. Neither side made any changes to their personnel during the interval. On 84 minutes, Chris Iwelumo was brought down by Danny Coles in the Bristol City penalty area. The referee awarded a penalty which Knight struck past Steve Phillips in the Bristol City goal. Bristol City pressured late but could not score, and the match ended 1–0 with Brighton being promoted to the newly renamed Football League Championship (formerly Football League First Division).

Brighton ended the next season in twentieth place in the First Division, two places and one point above the relegation zone. Bristol City manager Danny Wilson left the club the week after the final. In their following season, Bristol City finished in seventh position in the Second Division and missed out on the play-offs by one place and one point.

== Route to the final ==
Football League Second Division final table, leading positions
Pos	Team	Pld	W	D	L	GF	GA	GD	Pts
1	Plymouth Argyle	46	26	12	8	85	41	+44	90
2	Queens Park Rangers	46	22	17	7	80	45	+35	83
3	Bristol City	46	23	13	10	58	37	+21	82
4	Brighton & Hove Albion	46	22	11	13	64	43	+21	77
5	Swindon Town	46	20	13	13	76	58	+18	73
6	Hartlepool United	46	20	13	13	76	61	+15	73

Bristol City finished the regular 2003–04 season in third place in Football League Second Division, the third tier of the English football league system, one place ahead of Brighton & Hove Albion. Both therefore missed out on the two automatic places for promotion to the Football League Championship and instead took part in the play-offs to determine the third promoted team. Bristol City finished one point behind Queens Park Rangers (who were promoted in second place) and eight behind league winners Plymouth Argyle.

Brighton's opponents for their play-off semi-final were Swindon Town with the first match of the two-legged tie taking place at the County Ground in Swindon on 16 May 2004. In the 35th minute, a shot from Swindon's Sammy Igoe hit the Brighton goalpost, and midway through the second half, Tommy Mooney's strike hit the underside of Brighton's crossbar. With 18 minutes remaining, Richard Carpenter's deflected shot beat Rhys Evans in the Swindon goal to secure a 1–0 victory for the visitors. The second leg was played four days later at the Withdean Stadium in Brighton. After a goalless first half, Sam Parkin put Swindon ahead with a close-range shot in the 81st minute. With the aggregate score level 1–1 at full time, the game went into extra time, and midway through the first period, Rory Fallon put Swindon ahead with a low shot under Brighton's goalkeeper Ben Roberts. A diving header from Adam Virgo in the last moments of extra time made it 2–2 on aggregate and sent the match to a penalty shootout. Mooney missed his penalty and Andy Gurney's spot kick hit the post, and with all the other shots being converted, allowed Brighton to progress to the final with a 4–3 win on penalties.

In the second semi-final, Bristol City faced Hartlepool United; the first leg took place at Victoria Park in Hartlepool on 15 May 2004. The visitors took the lead after four minutes when Tony Rougier headed in Lee Peacock's cross. Joel Porter equalised for Hartlepool in the 74th minute to secure a 1–1 draw. The second leg was held three days at Ashton Gate in Bristol. Five minutes before half-time, Adam Boyd hit Bristol City's goalpost and the half ended goalless. Midway through the second half, Hartlepool's Antony Sweeney scored with a header from an Eifion Williams cross. With two minutes remaining, Marc Goodfellow levelled the match with a header before Christian Roberts made it 2–1 to Bristol City in the last minute, sending his side to the final with a 3–2 aggregate victory.

== Match ==
=== Background ===
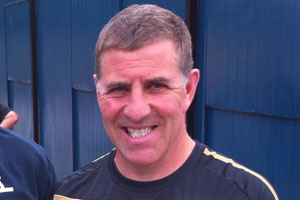
Mark McGhee (pictured in 2010) had been Brighton manager since October 2003.

Brighton had participated in one play-off final prior to 2004, when they lost 3–1 to Notts County in the 1991 Football League play-offs. This was Bristol City's fourth involvement in the play-offs and their second final; they had lost in the semi-finals in 1997 and 2003, and in the 1988 Football League Third Division play-off final 4–0 by Walsall after a replay. Brighton had been relegated from the First Division the previous season so were aiming for an immediate return, while Bristol City had played in the Second Division since suffering relegation from the First Division in the 1998–99 season. In the matches between the clubs during the regular season, Bristol City won the game at the Withdean 4–1 in November 2003, while the game the following April at Ashton Gate ended in a goalless draw. Brighton's top scorer during the regular season was Leon Knight with 25 goals, all in the league. For Bristol City, Peacock led the scoring with 16 goals (14 in the league and 2 in the League Cup).

Brighton manager Mark McGhee expressed hope that his club's exposure at a major final would bring publicity to their aim to build a new ground, saying he believed "the final would be a fantastic platform to demonstrate how badly we need a bigger stadium". McGhee had lost in three previous play-off semi-finals and was "happy for City to be favourites" to win this final. He had taken the job as Brighton manager in October 2003, having left Millwall two weeks earlier "by mutual consent". His counterpart, Danny Wilson, had been in charge at Bristol City since 2000, and had led the team to victory in the 2003 Football League Trophy Final at the Millennium Stadium. He said: "There's so much at stake, it'll be very tense. What I will guarantee is that we'll give everything ... All that work we did as far back as last July now hinges on 90 minutes or even one penalty kick."

Peacock's availability was in doubt for Bristol City with an injured ankle while Mickey Bell was suffering from a jarred knee. The final was broadcast live in the UK on Sky Sports and live commentary was available on BBC Radio 5 Live. Both sides adopted a 4–4–2 formation. The referee for the match was Richard Beeby.

=== Summary ===
The final kicked off around 3 p.m. at the Millennium Stadium on 30 May 2004 in front of a crowd of 65,167. According to Nick Szczepanik, writing in The Times, the first half was "a half of fouls and free kicks". Brian Tinnion's free kick was kept out by Ben Roberts. In the 33rd minute, Virgo was shown the first yellow card of the game. In the 40th minute, Roberts dropped a cross from Craig Woodman only for Tony Butler to shoot over the crossbar. Knight went closest to breaking the deadlock in the 43rd minute: Tommy Doherty had fouled Nathan Jones, and Knight's curling free kick from 20 yards (18 metres) struck the Bristol City crossbar. The first half ended goalless.

Neither side made any changes to their personnel during the interval. On 62 minutes, both sides made their first substitutions, with Brighton's Paul Reid coming on for Carpenter and Scott Murray replacing Lee Miller for Bristol City. In the 69th minute, Doherty became the first Bristol City player to be booked. On 78 minutes, Brighton made their second personnel change with John Piercy for Jones. Four minutes later Bristol City's Luke Wilkshire was brought on for Tinnion. On 84 minutes, Chris Iwelumo ran into the Bristol City penalty area, where he was brought down by Danny Coles. The referee awarded a penalty which Knight struck past Steve Phillips in the Bristol City goal to make it 1–0 to Brighton. It was his 26th goal of the season and made him the highest scorer in the league. In the 88th minute, Goodfellow came on for Butler. Bristol City could not score despite late pressure, and the match ended 1–0; Brighton was promoted to the newly renamed Football League Championship (formerly Football League First Division).

=== Details ===
30 May 2004
15:00

Brighton & Hove Albion	1–0	Bristol City
Knight 84' (pen.)	Report

Millennium Stadium, Cardiff
Attendance: 65,167
Referee: Richard Beeby

GK	29	Ben Roberts
DF	4	Danny Cullip
DF	14	Guy Butters
DF	19	Adam Virgo	(yellow card) 33'
MF	9	Gary Hart
MF	10	Charlie Oatway
MF	12	Richard Carpenter	(substituted off) 62'
MF	15	Nathan Jones	(substituted off) 78'
MF	26	Dan Harding
FW	7	Leon Knight
FW	30	Chris Iwelumo
Substitutes:
GK	1	Michel Kuipers
DF	3	Kerry Mayo
DF	24	Adam Hinshelwood
MF	20	John Piercy		(substituted on) 78'
MF	34	Paul Reid		(substituted on) 62'
Manager:
Mark McGhee

GK	1	Steve Phillips
DF	2	Louis Carey
DF	5	Tony Butler	(substituted off) 88'
DF	6	Matt Hill
DF	19	Danny Coles
MF	4	Tommy Doherty	(yellow card) 69'
MF	11	Brian Tinnion	(substituted off) 82'
MF	24	Craig Woodman
FW	10	Lee Miller	(substituted off) 62'
FW	18	Christian Roberts
FW	21	Tony Rougier
Substitutes:
GK	14	Mike Stowell
DF	8	Joe Burnell
MF	7	Luke Wilkshire		(substituted on) 82'
MF	16	Scott Murray		(substituted on) 62'
FW	15	Marc Goodfellow		(substituted on) 88'
Manager:
Danny Wilson

== Post-match ==
McGhee claimed the best team won, saying: "They never hurt us and I cannot remember any critical saves that Ben Roberts had to make ... To be a part of a day like this is incredible – as good as anything you will ever experience in football." Knight, the winning goalscorer, said he was confident that he was going to score the decisive penalty, recalling his recent success rate: "I have taken eight this season and scored every one." The Brighton chairman Dick Knight reiterated the importance of the new stadium to the club and its fans: "I just hope John Prescott realises just how much this means to the people of Brighton." Some of Brighton's players dropped the trophy while celebrating, damaging it.

Wilson suggested both disappointed and that the game was even: "There was nothing between the two clubs and they've just had that little bit of luck that gave them the win ... It was always going to take something like a penalty to win because it was so nervy." He left Bristol City the following month with club chairman Stephen Lansdown, confirming that the play-off final defeat "unquestionably caused the momentum of the club to falter", and that "the board believes it is time for a change".

Brighton ended the next season in twentieth place in the First Division, two places and one point above the relegation zone. In their following season, Bristol City finished in seventh position in the Second Division and missed out on the play-offs by one place and one point.
