= 2004–05 Brighton & Hove Albion F.C. season =

2004–05 season of Brighton & Hove Albion

Brighton & Hove Albion
2004–05 season
- Chairman: Dick Knight
- Manager: Mark McGhee
- Stadium: Withdean Stadium
- Championship: 20th
- FA Cup: Third round
- League Cup: First round
- Top goalscorer: League: Adam Virgo (8); All: Adam Virgo (8)
- Highest home attendance: 6,848 (vs. Ipswich Town, 8 May)
- Lowest home attendance: 4,217 (vs. Bristol Rovers, 24 August)
- Average home league attendance: 6,433
Home colours	Away colours

During the 2004–05 English football season, Brighton & Hove Albion F.C. competed in the Football League Championship, after promotion from the second division the previous season.

== Season summary ==
Brighton finished 20th out of 24 clubs, narrowly avoiding the drop by a single point, but achieving their highest league position for 14 years.

== Final league table ==
Pos	Team	Pld	W	D	L	GF	GA	GD	Pts	Promotion, qualification or relegation
18	Watford	46	12	16	18	52	59	−7	52	
19	Coventry City	46	13	13	20	61	73	−12	52	
20	Brighton & Hove Albion	46	13	12	21	40	65	−25	51	
21	Crewe Alexandra	46	12	14	20	66	86	−20	50	
22	Gillingham (R)	46	12	14	20	45	66	−21	50	Relegation to Football League One

Updated to match(es) played on 9 December 2011. Source: Football League Tables
Rules for classification: 1) points; 2) goal difference; 3) number of goals scored.
(R) Relegated

== Results ==
Brighton & Hove Albion's score comes first

=== Legend ===
Win	Draw	Loss

=== Championship ===
Date	Opponent	Venue	Result	Attendance	Scorers
7 August 2004	Reading	A	2–3	15,641	Molango, Robinson
10 August 2004	Plymouth Argyle	H	0–2	6,387	
14 August 2004	Coventry City	H	1–1	6,368	Virgo
21 August 2004	Wigan Athletic	A	0–3	8,681	
28 August 2004	Preston North End	H	1–0	5,996	Broomes (own goal)
30 August 2004	Leicester City	A	1–0	22,263	Virgo
11 September 2004	Watford	A	1–1	14,148	Virgo
14 September 2004	Wolverhampton Wanderers	H	0–1	6,804	
18 September 2004	Queens Park Rangers	H	2–3	6,612	Hinshelwood, Currie
25 September 2004	Gillingham	A	1–0	8,365	Knight (pen)
29 September 2004	Nottingham Forest	A	1–0	20,109	Virgo
2 October 2004	Sheffield United	H	1–1	6,418	Currie
16 October 2004	Crewe Alexandra	A	1–3	6,811	Jarrett
19 October 2004	Cardiff City	H	1–1	6,112	Knight
23 October 2004	Leeds United	H	1–1	6,716	Virgo
30 October 2004	Sunderland	A	0–2	25,532	
3 November 2004	Derby County	A	0–3	22,480	
6 November 2004	Crewe Alexandra	H	1–3	6,163	Reid
13 November 2004	West Ham United	A	1–0	29,514	Butters
20 November 2004	Burnley	H	0–1	6,109	
27 November 2004	Ipswich Town	A	0–1	26,269	
4 December 2004	Rotherham United	H	1–0	6,076	Harding
11 December 2004	Millwall	A	0–2	12,196	
17 December 2004	Stoke City	H	0–1	6,028	
26 December 2004	Gillingham	H	2–1	6,420	Carpenter, Virgo
28 December 2004	Wolverhampton Wanderers	A	1–1	28,516	Hart
1 January 2005	Queens Park Rangers	A	0–0	15,898	
3 January 2005	Watford	H	2–1	6,335	Mayo, Knight
15 January 2005	Sheffield United	A	2–1	21,482	Carpenter, Knight
22 January 2005	Nottingham Forest	H	0–0	6,704	
29 January 2005	Leeds United	A	1–1	27,033	Butters
5 February 2005	Derby County	H	2–3	6,587	McCammon (2)
12 February 2005	Cardiff City	A	0–2	11,435	
19 February 2005	Sunderland	H	2–1	6,647	Carpenter, McCammon
26 February 2005	Millwall	H	1–0	6,608	Hart
5 March 2005	Stoke City	A	0–2	14,908	
12 March 2005	Plymouth Argyle	A	1–5	15,606	Oatway
15 March 2005	Wigan Athletic	H	2–4	6,306	Virgo, Hammond
21 March 2005	Reading	H	0–1	6,108	
2 April 2005	Coventry City	A	1–2	18,606	Virgo
5 April 2005	Preston North End	A	0–3	14,234	
9 April 2005	Leicester City	H	1–1	6,638	Reid
16 April 2005	Burnley	A	1–1	11,611	Hammond
23 April 2005	West Ham United	H	2–2	6,819	Hammond (2)
30 April 2005	Rotherham United	A	1–0	6,549	McLaren (own goal)
8 May 2005	Ipswich Town	H	1–1	6,848	Virgo

=== FA Cup ===
Round	Date	Opponent	Venue	Result	Attendance	Goalscorers
R3	8 January 2005	Tottenham Hotspur	A	1–2	36,094	Carpenter

=== League Cup ===
Round	Date	Opponent	Venue	Result	Attendance	Goalscorers
R1	24 August 2004	Bristol Rovers	H	1–2	4,217	Butters

== First-team squad ==
Squad at end of season

Note: Flags indicate national team as defined under FIFA eligibility rules; some limited exceptions apply. Players may hold more than one non-FIFA nationality.

No.	Pos.	Nation	Player
1	GK	NED	Michel Kuipers
2	DF	ENG	Paul Watson
3	DF	ENG	Kerry Mayo
5	DF	ENG	Joe Dolan (on loan from Millwall)
6	MF	CYP	Alexis Nicolas
7	FW	ENG	Leon Knight
9	FW	ENG	Gary Hart
10	MF	ENG	Charlie Oatway
12	MF	ENG	Richard Carpenter
14	DF	ENG	Guy Butters
15	DF	WAL	Nathan Jones
16	MF	AUS	Paul Reid
17	FW	SUI	Maheta Molango
18	FW	SLE	Albert Jarrett

No.	Pos.	Nation	Player
19	DF	ENG	Adam Virgo
20	GK	SWE	Rami Shaaban
21	MF	ENG	Chris McPhee
22	MF	ENG	Dean Hammond
23	GK	NIR	Alan Blayney (on loan from Southampton)
24	DF	ENG	Adam Hinshelwood
25	FW	ENG	Mark McCammon
26	MF	ENG	Dan Harding
27	DF	ENG	Gary Elphick
28	DF	ENG	Adam El-Abd
30	FW	ENG	Jake Robinson
31	MF	ENG	Dean Cox
33	GK	ENG	Chris May
34	DF	ENG	Joel Lynch

=== Left club during season ===
Note: Flags indicate national team as defined under FIFA eligibility rules; some limited exceptions apply. Players may hold more than one non-FIFA nationality.

No.	Pos.	Nation	Player
4	DF	ENG	Danny Cullip (to Sheffield United)
5	DF	ENG	Dean Blackwell (retired)
8	MF	ENG	Simon Rodger (retired)
11	MF	ENG	Darren Currie (to Ipswich Town)
20	FW	ENG	John Piercy (retired)
23	MF	ENG	David Lee (to Oldham Athletic)

No.	Pos.	Nation	Player
23	GK	GER	David Yelldell (on loan from Blackburn Rovers)
25	FW	ENG	Steve Claridge (to Brentford)
27	MF	ENG	Dan Beck (to Eastbourne Borough)
29	GK	ENG	Ben Roberts (retired)
31	MF	ENG	Darren Budd (to Bognor Regis Town)
