= Richard Beeby =

English football referee

- Full name: Richard J Beeby
- Born: 11 January 1962 (age 64); Northampton, Northants, England

Domestic
Years	League	Role
1999–	Football League	Referee

International
Years	League	Role
2005–2007	UEFA	Fourth official

Richard J. Beeby (born 11 January 1962 in Northampton, Northants) is an English association football referee who operates in the Football League, and has also previously handled Premier League games.

== Career ==
Beeby began his refereeing career in the local Northampton leagues, eventually attaining Football League status in 1999.

His first ever match as a Football League referee was the 2–1 home win by Southend over Plymouth in the old Third Division on 7 August 1999, and resulted in him having to dismiss a player, Mick Heathcote of Plymouth.

During the Second Division match played between Colchester and AFC Bournemouth at Layer Road on 2 September 2000, Beeby was surrounded by away side players following a decision in their 3–1 defeat. This resulted in a £2,500 fine for the Dorset club, due to "a failure to ensure their players conducted themselves in an orderly fashion".

In 2004, he took charge of the old First Division Play-off Semi-final, first leg, between Crystal Palace and Sunderland at Selhurst Park on 14 May 2004, and was then appointed to control the old Second Division Play-off Final between Brighton & Hove Albion and Bristol City at the Millennium Stadium, Cardiff, on 30 May 2004, when a late Leon Knight penalty secured promotion for the South coast team.

On 26 October 2005, Beeby handed out the fastest red card in Old Trafford history to Barnet goalkeeper Ross Flitney after 80 seconds in their 4–1 League Cup defeat to Manchester United. The decision was criticised by both managers. The red card was later rescinded as Flitney's handball was not denying an obvious goalscoring opportunity.

Although not on the Premier League list of referees, Beeby was given a "trial run" in that league on 7 May 2005, when he was man-in-the-middle for the Aston Villa versus Manchester City tie at Villa Park, which ended 2–1 to City. In that year, he was also given the honour of being the referee for the FA Vase Final. This was played on 14 May 2005 at White Hart Lane in London, between A.F.C. Sudbury and Didcot Town. He also handled a Semi-final second leg in the Football League Championship Play-offs, when Preston drew 0–0 at Derby to ensure their place in the Final, thanks to a 2–0 first leg victory.

Despite having already refereed his first Premier League match, and subsequently being given two more fixtures in that league during the 2005–06 season, Beeby has since been confined to operating in the three divisions of the Football League. Incidentally, on 28 December 2005, he should have taken up his next Premiership appointment at Craven Cottage, when Fulham met Aston Villa, but he suffered an injury in the "warm-up", and was replaced by fourth official Andy D'Urso.

He was given further responsibility in the Play-offs in season 2006–07, when he took control of the Football League Two Play-offs Semi-final, first leg, between Bristol Rovers and Lincoln City at the Memorial Stadium on 12 May 2007.

Only fifteen minutes into his FA Cup appointment on 11 November 2007 at Gainsborough, who were entertaining Hartlepool, Beeby "had to go off with a calf strain and was replaced by linesman Michael Naylor with the fourth official taking the flag".

Beeby is also listed by the Football Association as their Northamptonshire fitness coach, based in Kettering.

=== UEFA involvement ===
Since 2005, he acted as fourth official in European club matches under the jurisdiction of UEFA, until his compulsory retirement from that activity at the age of 45 in 2007.
