= Alexis Nicolas =

English footballer

Personal information
- Date of birth: 13 February 1983 (age 43)
- Place of birth: Westminster, England
- Position: Midfielder

Youth career
- Aston Villa
- 2001–2004: Chelsea

Senior career*
| Years | Team | Apps | (Gls) |
| 2004 | Chelsea | 2 | (0) |
| 2004 | → Brighton & Hove Albion (loan) | 14 | (0) |
| 2004–2006 | Brighton & Hove Albion | 30 | (0) |
| 2006 | St Albans City | 6 | (0) |
| 2012 | Hadley | | |
| Total | | 52 | (0) |

International career
- Cyprus U21
- * Club domestic league appearances and goals

Alexis Nicolas (born 13 February 1983) is a former professional footballer who played as a midfielder. He works in commercial real estate investment.

== Football career ==
Born in Westminster, Nicolas played youth football with Aston Villa before joining Chelsea in 2001. He made his debut for Chelsea on 24 January 2004, in an FA Cup game against Scarborough; Paul Wilson of The Guardian described Nicolas' performance as "encouraging." After a loan spell with Brighton & Hove Albion, Nicolas signed for the club permanently in October 2004. After leaving Brighton, he played non-league football with St Albans City, playing for them on a week-to-week contract from September to November 2006. He joined Hadley as a player-coach in January 2012.

He was also a Cyprus under 21-international.

== Finance career ==
After working for Franc Warwick, Nicolas set up his own firm, Springer Nicolas, in 2012.

== Career statistics ==
| Club | Season | League | | FA Cup | | League Cup | | Other | | Total | |
| Club | Season | Apps | Goals | Apps | Goals | Apps | Goals | Apps | Goals | Apps | Goals |
|---|---|---|---|---|---|---|---|---|---|---|---|
| Chelsea | 2003–04 | 2 | 0 | 1 | 0 | 0 | 0 | 0 | 0 | 3 | 0 |
| Chelsea | 2004–05 | 0 | 0 | 0 | 0 | 0 | 0 | 0 | 0 | 0 | 0 |
| Chelsea | Total | 2 | 0 | 1 | 0 | 0 | 0 | 0 | 0 | 3 | 0 |
| Brighton & Hove Albion (loan) | 2004–05 | 14 | 0 | 0 | 0 | 1 | 0 | 0 | 0 | 15 | 0 |
| Brighton & Hove Albion | 2004–05 | 19 | 0 | 0 | 0 | 0 | 0 | 0 | 0 | 19 | 0 |
| Brighton & Hove Albion | 2005–06 | 11 | 0 | 0 | 0 | 1 | 0 | 0 | 0 | 12 | 0 |
| Brighton & Hove Albion | Total | 30 | 0 | 0 | 0 | 1 | 0 | 0 | 0 | 31 | 0 |
| St Albans City | 2006–07 | 6 | 0 | 0 | 0 | 0 | 0 | 0 | 0 | 6 | 0 |
| Career total | | 52 | 0 | 1 | 0 | 2 | 0 | 0 | 0 | 55 | 0 |
