= Danny Hutchins =

English footballer

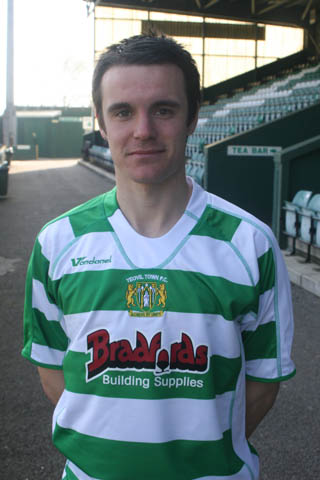
- Hutchins in 2009

Personal information
- Full name: Daniel Sean Hutchins
- Date of birth: 23 September 1989 (age 37)
- Place of birth: Northolt, England
- Height: 5 ft 8 in (1.73 m)
- Positions: Defender; midfielder

Team information
- Current team: Barnet (performance analyst)

Youth career
- 2005–2007: Tottenham Hotspur

Senior career*
Years	Team	Apps	(Gls)
2007–2009	Tottenham Hotspur	0	(0)
2009	→ Yeovil Town (loan)	9	(0)
2009–2010	Yeovil Town	7	(0)
2011–2012	Dunstable Town	44	(13)
2012–2013	Arlesey Town	?	(?)
2013–2016	Kings Langley	54	(27)
2016–2017	Barton Rovers	?	(?)
2017–2019	Hayes & Yeading United	7	(3)
- * Club domestic league appearances and goals as of 18:02, 16 April 2015 (UTC)

Daniel Sean Hutchins (born 23 September 1989) is an English retired football player, who works for Barnet

== Career ==
Before joining Tottenham Hotspur, Hutchins attended Northolt High School, London, where he helped them become County Champions in 2003 and 2004. He then moved to Leighton Buzzard in Bedfordshire and won the same competition with Vandyke Upper School.

Hutchins joined Spurs in 2005 where he stayed until March 2009. Then he signed a one-month loan move to Yeovil Town. He was going to be put straight into the squad for the game against Hereford United. but the match was postponed due to a waterlogged pitch. He then made his league debut on 7 March against Carlisle United in the 1–1 draw.

On 1 June 2009, Hutchins was released from his Tottenham Hotspur contract.

Yeovil confirmed that on 10 June 2009, Danny had agreed a two-year deal at the club, becoming Terry Skiverton's first permanent signing. On 13 May 2010 he was put on the transfer list by Yeovil. On 13 November 2010, after a 3–1 loss to Dagenham & Redbridge, Hutchins' contract was terminated by mutual consent. In 2011-2012 Hutchins signed for Dunstable Town, moving on to Arlesey Town and then Kings Langley. As of February 2023, Hutchins worked for Barnet FC

== Career statistics ==
As of 8 May 2010

Club performance
Club	Season	League		FA Cup		League Cup		Other		Total	
Club	Season	Apps	Goals	Apps	Goals	Apps	Goals	Apps	Goals	Apps	Goals
Tottenham Hotspur	2008–09	0	0	0	0	0	0	0	0	0	0
Yeovil Town	2008–09	2	0	0	0	0	0	0	0	9	0
Yeovil Town	2009–10	1	0	1	0	0	0	1	0	9	0
Yeovil Town	2010–11	0	0	0	0	0	0	0	0	0	0
Total		2	0	1	0	0	0	1	0	2	0
