= Michael Senior =

English footballer

Personal information
- Full name: Michael Graham Senior
- Date of birth: 3 March 1981 (age 45)
- Place of birth: Huddersfield, England
- Positions: Defender; centre midfielder

Youth career
- Huddersfield Town

Senior career*
Years	Team	Apps	(Gls)
1999–2002	Huddersfield Town	4	(0)
2002	Wakefield & Emley	0	(0)
2002–2004	Halifax Town	21	(0)
2003	→ Ossett Town (loan)		
2004–	Ossett Albion		
- * Club domestic league appearances and goals as of 18:09, 3 December 2009 (UTC)

Michael Graham Senior (born 3 March 1981 in Huddersfield) is a footballer who played in the Football League for Huddersfield Town. Since 2004 he has played for Ossett Albion in the Northern Premier League.

Senior was born in Huddersfield, elder brother of Phil Senior and started his football career in Huddersfield Town's academy. He made his debut in September 1999 as a substitute in the League Cup, and played his first Football League game as a very late substitute in a 1–0 defeat at Crewe Alexandra on 24 October 2000 in Division One. He made three more substitute appearances, and was released at the end of the 2001–02 season. He signed for Northern Premier League club Wakefield & Emley, but never played for them before moving up a level to join Halifax Town of the Conference. He stayed with Halifax for two seasons, which included a loan spell at Ossett Town, and was given a monthly contract at the start of the 2004–05 season. When this was not renewed he signed for Ossett Albion of the Northern Premier League in October 2004.
