= Gareth Evans (footballer, born 1981) =

English footballer (born 1981)

Personal information
- Full name: Gareth Joseph Evans
- Date of birth: 15 February 1981 (age 45)
- Place of birth: Leeds, England
- Height: 6 ft 0 in (1.83 m)
- Position: Full back

Youth career
- Leeds United

Senior career*
Years	Team	Apps	(Gls)
1998–2001	Leeds United	1	(0)
2001–2003	Huddersfield Town	35	(0)
2003–2006	Blackpool	45	(0)
Total		81	(0)

International career
- England U18
- * Club domestic league appearances and goals

Gareth Joseph Evans (born 15 February 1981) is a former professional footballer who played in the Football League as a full back for Leeds United, Huddersfield Town and Blackpool. He was forced to retire at the age of 24 because of a longstanding knee injury.

== Career ==
Evans started his career as a trainee at his hometown club Leeds United. In 1997, he was an unused substitute as a Leeds side including future internationals Jonathan Woodgate, Paul Robinson and Harry Kewell won the FA Youth Cup, and he went on to be capped by England at under-18 level. He made his first-team debut in the Olympic Stadium in Munich, as a substitute in a Champions League qualifier against 1860 Munich in August 2000, but made only one more first-team appearance for Leeds before leaving to join Huddersfield Town on a free transfer in August 2001. He assisted the Terriers in finishing in sixth place in Division Two, thus reaching the play-offs. Injury kept him out for the whole of the 2002–03 season, at the end of which he was released.

After a trial with the club, Evans then signed for Blackpool, initially on a monthly contract, then on a one-year deal with an option for a further year. He missed the Seasiders' victory in the 2004 Football League Trophy with a broken foot which cut short his season, but the club still took up the option on his contract. Once he regained his place in the 2004–05 season, he played in a 10-match unbeaten run, but in February 2005 he sustained a knee injury which required surgery. His contract was extended for another year in May 2005, but he never played again for the club, and retired from the professional game in 2006. He went on to work in marketing for electronics distributor Premier Farnell.
