= Craig Calver =

English footballer

Personal information
- Full name: Craig Tony Calver
- Date of birth: 20 January 1991 (age 35)
- Place of birth: Cambridge, England
- Position: Striker

Youth career
- Bishop's Stortford
- Peterborough United
- Cambridge United
- 2003–2005: Cambridge City
- 2005–2009: Ipswich Town
- 2009–2010: Southend United

Senior career*
Years	Team	Apps	(Gls)
2009–2010	Southend United	0	(0)
2009	→ Harlow Town (loan)	2	(1)
2009	→ St Albans City (loan)	4	(0)
2010	→ Braintree Town (loan)	5	(1)
2010	AFC Sudbury	9	(2)
2010–2011	Yeovil Town	5	(0)
2011	→ Braintree Town (loan)	4	(0)
2011	King's Lynn Town	1	(0)
2011	Bishop's Stortford	1	(0)
2011–2012	AFC Sudbury	9	(0)
2011–2012	→ Haverhill Rovers (loan)		
2012	Chelmsford City	14	(2)
2012–2013	St Neots Town	9	(1)
2013	Cambridge City	15	(1)
2013–2017	Saffron Walden Town		
2017	Coggeshall Town	0	(0)
2017	Mildenhall Town	14	(3)
2017–2018	Enfield Town	6	(0)
2018	Cheshunt	1	(0)
2018–2020	Saffron Walden Town	30	(4)
2020	Bishop's Stortford	5	(1)
2020–2023	Saffron Walden Town	58	(27)
- * Club domestic league appearances and goals as of 21:11, 11 August 2024 (UTC)

Craig Tony Calver (born 20 January 1991) is an English footballer who last played as a striker for Saffron Walden Town.

== Career ==
Born in Cambridge and brought up in Saffron Walden, Calver attended Saffron Walden County High School and spent time in the academies at Bishop's Stortford, Peterborough United, Cambridge United and Cambridge City. Calver spent his early teen years at Ipswich Town where he scored goals in the third team, the youth and the reserve teams. However, he never made a first team appearance for Ipswich before being released in March 2009. He was then signed by Southend United as a first year professional where he scored 16 goals in 18 starts for their under-18 side.

Soon after joining Southend, Calver was loaned out to Isthmian League Division One North side Harlow Town who he appeared for twice in his month stay scoring one goal. In August 2009, he went out on loan for another month this time to Conference South side St Albans City, but had limited opportunities appearing four times but failing to score. After still failing to make the first team of Southend he was sent out on loan to fellow Conference South side Braintree Town to gain more experience again for a month making five substitute appearances scoring one goal.

On 25 March 2010, Calver joined Southern Football League Division One Central side AFC Sudbury and impressed in games until the end of season, starting nine games scoring twice. This successful form earned him a trial with League One side Yeovil Town and featured in all but one of their pre-season matches, these impressive performances earned him a one-year contract with the club. He made his professional debut for the club in the 4–0 away defeat to Notts County on 4 September 2010 as a substitute in the 77th minute. Calver was loaned back out to Conference South side Braintree Town in February 2011 but only made four substitute appearances before returning to Yeovil Town. He was released at the end of the 2010–11 season after making only six substitute appearances.

Following his release from Yeovil, Calver linked up with Conference North side Histon for pre-season training, but failed to earn a contract from his trial. Calver then turned up at fellow Conference North side Bishop's Stortford appearing in their pre-season friendlies. In September 2011, Calver re-signed for AFC Sudbury, before joined Haverhill Rovers on dual-registration.

In the summer of 2012, Calver signed for Conference South side Chelmsford City. After two goals in 14 appearances for Chelmsford, Calver saw out the 2012–13 season with St Neots Town and Cambridge City.

In 2013, Calver joined Eastern Counties League club Saffron Walden Town. Calver stayed at Saffron Walden for four years, before departing in 2017.

Calver began the 2017–18 season at Coggeshall Town, however failed to make an appearance, being an unused substitute twice during his time at the club. Following his time at Coggeshall, Calver joined Mildenhall Town, before playing for Enfield Town and Cheshunt in the 2017–18 season. In the summer of 2018, Calver rejoined Saffron Walden. In February 2020, Calver re-signed for Bishop's Stortford, before the COVID-19 pandemic halted football. Following the resumption of football in England, Calver once again re-joined Saffron Walden Town in 2020, scoring 11 goals in 15 league appearances, before football was suspended for a second time due to the pandemic.
