= John Piercy =

English footballer (born 1979)

Personal information
- Full name: John William Piercy
- Date of birth: 18 September 1979 (age 47)
- Place of birth: Forest Gate, England
- Height: 5 ft 11 in (1.80 m)
- Position: Midfielder

Youth career
- ?–1998: Tottenham Hotspur

Senior career*
Years	Team	Apps	(Gls)
1998–2002	Tottenham Hotspur	8	(0)
2002–2004	Brighton & Hove Albion	30	(4)
2004–2007	Eastbourne Town	19	(3)
Total		57	(7)

International career
1998	England U18	3	(0)
1999	England U20	1	(0)
- * Club domestic league appearances and goals

John William Piercy (born 18 September 1979) is an English former football midfielder who played in the Premier League for Tottenham Hotspur and in the Football League for Brighton & Hove Albion.

== Club career ==
=== Tottenham Hotspur ===
Born in Forest Gate, England, Piercy started his career at Tottenham Hotspur and after progressing through the youth ranks and reserves, he was called up to the first team by Manager George Graham in 1999.

Shortly after, Piercy made his Tottenham Hotspur debut on 13 October 1999, making his first start and played 74 minutes before substituted, in a 3–1 win over Crewe Alexandra. Three days later, on 16 October 1999, Piercy made his league debut for the club, coming on as a substitute in the second half for goalscorer Chris Armstrong, in a 1–0 win over Derby County. Piercy went on to make four appearances later in the 1999–00 season. While at the Tottenham Hotspur, Piercy appeared in England U18 and England U20.

On 23 August 2002, however, Piercy was released by the club, with his first team opportunities were increasingly slim in recent years.

=== Brighton & Hove Albion ===
After leaving Tottenham Hotspur, Piercy joined Division One side Brighton & Hove Albion on 20 September 2002 after impressing the club's management at the trial and signed a one-year contract with them. Piercy was previously linked with the club before and was on the verge of joining in March, but fell through.

Piercy made his Brighton & Hove Albion debut the next day (on 21 September 2002), where he played 78 minutes, in a 1–0 win over Rotherham United. However, in his next appearance against Ipswich Town in the League Cup, Piercy suffered a leg injury that kept him out for months. On 10 December 2002, he made his return from the first team, coming on as a later substitute, in a 1–1 draw against Ipswich Town. Piercy then went on to make four appearances in his first season at the club, with Piercy spending the rest of the season at the club's reserve. Following this, he signed a one-year contract extension with them.

In the 2003–04 season, Piercy appeared in and out of the first team in the first half of the season, as he fight for the first team experience at the club. However, he received a red card after a second bookable offence, in a 2–1 win over Notts County. After serving a one match suspension, he scored his first goal for the club on 29 November 2003, in a 2–0 win over Wrexham. Piercy then scored a brace on 26 December 2003, in a 4–0 win over Wycombe Wanderers. However, injuries restricted his appearances much further Despite this, Piercy scored again later in the season: one in the league against Blackpool. Piercy then helped the club reach the play-offs and converted the penalty successfully to help the club win 5–4 in the penalty shoot-out and the club eventually promoted to the Championship next season after beating Bristol City 1–0 in the Second Division play-off final.

At the end of the 2003–04 season, Piercy was offered a three-month contract by Manager Mark McGhee, explaining that: "they need change in attitude" to play in Division One. Despite the contract length, he signed a contract with them until October on 11 June 2004. The following season saw Piercy making two appearances: both on 3 November 2004 and 6 November 2004 against Derby County and Crewe Alexandra respectively. However, months at the club, Piercy announced his retirement at 25 on 9 November 2004 after a series of injuries plagued again. It also came after he suffered a back problem in the pre-season tour and didn't make his return until October.

=== Eastbourne Town ===
After leaving Brighton & Hove Albion, Piercy signed for Eastbourne Town in 2006 after he came out of retirement after spending two years, regaining his fitness and trying to gaining a qualification in coaching. After a year at the club, having become a first team regular, Piercy was released by the club in December 2007.

== After Football ==
After announcing his retirement for the second time, Piercy went into coaching since at Eastbourne Town in 2007.

In June 2004, Piercy married his long-term girlfriend, but later divorced her shortly after. In 2012, Piercy met his current partner, Sarah, with whom he shares a home and is a step-parent to her three children, one of whom is making his own way in the football scene being signed to Brighton and Hove Albion youth academy.

John Piercy taught Physical Education at Ocklynge Junior School, East Sussex for a number of years, successfully coaching the football teams. In 2018, he was promoted within the school and is now a Behaviour Mentor. He also teaches upcoming football stars at CACL in Eastbourne alongside his former football scout, Chris Pinch.

== Honours ==
Brighton & Hove Albion

- Football League Second Division play-offs: 2004
