= Leon Knight =

English footballer (born 1982)

Personal information
- Full name: Leon Leroy Knight
- Date of birth: 16 September 1982 (age 44)
- Place of birth: Hackney, England
- Height: 5 ft 5 in (1.65 m)
- Position: Forward

Youth career
- Chelsea

Senior career*
Years	Team	Apps	(Gls)
1999–2003	Chelsea	1	(0)
2001	→ Queens Park Rangers (loan)	11	(0)
2001–2002	→ Huddersfield Town (loan)	31	(16)
2002–2003	→ Sheffield Wednesday (loan)	24	(3)
2003	→ Brighton & Hove Albion (loan)	2	(4)
2003–2006	Brighton & Hove Albion	106	(32)
2006–2007	Swansea City	25	(19)
2006–2007	→ Barnsley (loan)	9	(0)
2007–2008	Milton Keynes Dons	33	(5)
2008	Wycombe Wanderers	20	(5)
2008–2009	Rushden & Diamonds	12	(4)
2009	Thrasivoulos	3	(0)
2009–2010	Hamilton Academical	6	(0)
2010	Queen of the South	6	(0)
2010–2012	Coleraine	43	(20)
2012	Glentoran	9	(1)
2014–2016	Barnton		

International career
2000–2001	England U18	10	(2)
- England U19
2002	England U20	5	(0)

Managerial career
- 2015–2016: Barnton
- * Club domestic league appearances and goals

Leon Leroy Knight (born 16 September 1982) is an English former footballer who plays as a striker. A journeyman player, he has played for fifteen different clubs spanning five countries; England, Scotland, Wales, Northern Ireland and Greece.

Having begun his career with Chelsea, he spent time on loan with Queens Park Rangers, Huddersfield Town, Sheffield Wednesday and Brighton & Hove Albion before joining the latter permanently in 2003. Knight spent three years with Brighton, scoring 30 goals in 106 league matches. He was transferred to Swansea City in 2006 and had a loan spell with Barnsley before joining Milton Keynes Dons and then Wycombe Wanderers.

Knight signed for Rushden & Diamonds in 2008, but left the club five months later when he was sacked for misconduct. Rushden retained his registration and would not release it to another English club unless they were compensated, which prevented Knight from playing in England for three years. He subsequently played in Greece for Thrasivoulos Fylis, Scotland for Hamilton Academical and Queen of the South and Northern Ireland for Coleraine, before joining Glentoran in January 2012. He was released by Glentoran in June 2012 after a probationary clause in his contract was invoked by the club.

== Playing career ==
Knight began his career as a trainee at Chelsea (where he made one appearance in the UEFA Cup against Levski Sofia), before spending loan periods at Queens Park Rangers, Huddersfield Town, Sheffield Wednesday and Brighton & Hove Albion before joining Brighton on a permanent contract in August 2003. During his spell at Huddersfield, he reignited the Terriers' play-off push and formed an unlikely partnership with local hero Andy Booth, earning himself the nickname 'Neon Light'. Unfortunately, he was sent off in the penultimate game of the season and was suspended for the play-off games. Although his transfer was initially free, £50,000 was to be paid if Brighton were promoted. It was Knight himself who secured Brighton's promotion with his penalty against Bristol City in the play-off final at the Millennium Stadium, Cardiff in 2004.

Knight moved to Swansea City shortly afterwards and scored a hat-trick on his debut against Milton Keynes Dons. His stay at the Liberty Stadium was short-lived and he was placed on the transfer list in October 2006, due to a poor attitude. After a short spell on loan with Barnsley, he joined Milton Keynes Dons in January 2007. In January 2008, Knight signed for Wycombe Wanderers, just one year after joining MK Dons. On 19 August 2008, Knight's contract was "terminated by mutual consent", after he scored five goals in 20 appearances during his short stay with Wycombe.

Knight signed for Rushden & Diamonds on a three-year contract on 24 August 2008. but was transfer listed on 29 October, along with Lee Tomlin, Curtis Woodhouse, Andy Burgess, Phil Gulliver, Sagi Burton, Lee Phillips and Dean McDonald, after the club's poor start to the season. On 12 December, Rushden & Diamonds confirmed that Knight had been sacked after continual breaches of conduct between November and December 2008. Despite his contract having been terminated, Rushden & Diamonds retained the player's registration, preventing Knight from joining another English club until the term of his contract had expired, unless £30,000 in compensation was paid to the club. The FA confirmed and validated the retaining of the registration, meaning Knight could not play at any level of English football until the contract had expired. The contract had initially been due to expire following the 2009–10 season, but Rushden & Diamonds invoked a clause allowing them to extend the contract by a further year.

On 13 January 2009, Knight joined Greek club Thrasivoulos Filis on a six-month contract. He made his Super League debut on 25 January as a second half sub playing 20 minutes against Skoda Xanthi. Knight made only 2 subsequent appearances as a sub, his last appearance coming on 8 February 2009. Knight had not been involved in any game for the club in over 3 months and looked certain to leave Thrasivoulos when his contract expired at the end of the season. After his contract expired he went on trial with Major League Soccer side San Jose Earthquakes.

Knight joined Scottish side Hamilton Academical on 21 August 2009 and he made his SPL debut against Aberdeen as a second-half substitute the following day. He made one start and six substitute appearances for the Lanarkshire side. He was sent off for his role in a tunnel brawl after a win over Heart of Midlothian, having been an unused substitute during the game. Knight was later released by Hamilton on 14 January 2010. The next day, Knight joined Dumfries club Queen of the South until the end of the season. He made his debut in a 1–1 draw with Dundee on 23 January. He was released at the end of the 2009–10 season, having made six league appearances for the club. In September 2010, Knight was set to return to English football with Conference side Darlington after a successful trial, but his transfer was blocked by previous club Rushden, who had held onto his registration and demanded £30,000 for the deal to be completed. Knight responded by criticising Rushden & Diamonds on his Twitter account, saying that he has chosen not to buy-out his contract as a matter of principle. "Rushden have said they don't want the money from Darlington, they want it from me – I refuse to pay them out of principle. If I wanted I could raise the money and pay them but I don't want to give them the satisfaction."

The following month, Knight elected to continue his career outside England by signing for Northern Irish side Coleraine. He scored twice on his debut in a 2–1 win away to Glenavon on 16 October 2010. He agreed an 18-month contract extension with the club in January 2011, and finished the 2010–11 season with 15 goals from 25 matches. In June, he went on trial with Swindon Town, but was released after two days because of insufficient fitness levels. "He's not the player for us. It's not his fault, we tried, but his fitness at the moment is not good," said Swindon manager Paolo Di Canio. "We are not in a position where we can wait for a player to be fit, we need a player to be ready and fit in the next two weeks, to compete and challenge during the season." Two weeks later, Knight was transfer-listed and suspended by Coleraine for failing to appear for training and matches. He also breached club rules by stating his desire to return to England and play for another IFA Premiership club. However, a fortnight later, Knight signed a new two-year contract with the club. "I said things about wanting to leave and at the time I felt it was right for me, but things change," he said. "I've spoken at great length with the manager over the last three or four days and I came back to him wanting to work something out. Agreeing a new two-year deal shows my commitment to the club and that I'm eager to put the last few weeks behind me."

In January 2012 however, Coleraine asked Knight to either live in Northern Ireland or pay his own travel costs, as he was still living in London and had to travel over to Northern Ireland for each game, which was costing Coleraine £1,000–£1,500 per month. An agreement could not be reached, and Knight joined Glentoran on 30 January 2012. His stay at Glentoran was relatively short lived, as the club released him in June 2012 when they invoked a probationary clause in his contract after he allegedly made homophobic comments on Twitter.

On 21 August 2014, Knight sign for North West Counties League First Division side Barnton.

== Coaching career ==
On 18 March 2015, Knight was appointed Barnton's first team manager, also continuing to play for the club. On 15 February 2016, Knight resigned as manager of Barnton.

== International career ==
Knight played for England at under 18, under 19 and under 20 level.

== Personal life ==
Knight was born in Hackney, London, to a Jamaican mother and St. Lucian father, and was educated at Raine's Foundation School, Bethnal Green, He has three sisters, and is the cousin of former Bolton Wanderers defender Zat Knight. He is the cousin of Grime MC Trim. Knight was a good all-around sportsman and a third dan black belt in karate as a child. He played schoolboy football for his school, the Hackney & Tower Hamlets District team and Senrab, and had trials with Charlton Athletic and Tottenham Hotspur before joining Chelsea as a trainee.

Knight's use of Twitter in May 2012 caused condemnation after he posted remarks opposing US President Barack Obama's support for same sex marriage. Knight was suspended by Glentoran on 10 May 2012, pending investigation into the aforementioned remarks. This later led to his release by the club in June 2012.

Knight's use of Twitter has also come under criticism, including in the national press, as he regularly engages in misogynistic tirades against women's football. In September 2018, he used several expletives while condemning the use of female pundits, thought to be in response to Alex Scott's appearance on Sky Sports during an England men's game against Switzerland, saying men and women were "nowhere near equal" and that female players "can't kick a ball". In June 2019, he came to public attention again for repeatedly making sexist tweets during the 2019 FIFA Women's World Cup. It provoked a response from West Ham midfielder Kate Longhurst whom he asked "how many headers can you do?" In response he then demanded a preseason friendly with a team made up of some his Twitter followers called Men United. Knight received no response from West Ham.

== Career statistics ==
Appearances and goals by club, season and competition
Club	Season	League			National cup		League cup		Europe		Other		Total	
Club	Season	Division	Apps	Goals	Apps	Goals	Apps	Goals	Apps	Goals	Apps	Goals	Apps	Goals
Chelsea	2000–01	Premier League	0	0	0	0	0	0	0	0	0	0	0	0
Chelsea	2001–02	Premier League	0	0	―		0	0	1 (Note: Appearance in UEFA Cup)	0	―		1	0
Chelsea	Total		0	0	0	0	0	0	1	0	0	0	1	0
Queens Park Rangers (loan)	2000–01	First Division	11	0	0	0	0	0	―		―		11	0
Huddersfield Town (loan)	2001–02	Second Division	31	16	2	1	―		―		4 (Note: Appearances in Football League Trophy)	1	37	18
Sheffield Wednesday (loan)	2002–03	First Division	24	3	1	0	2	0	―		―		27	3
Brighton & Hove Albion	2003–04	Second Division	46	26	1	0	2	0	―		6 (Note: Three appearances in Second Division play-offs; three appearances, one goal in Football League Trophy)	2	55	28
Brighton & Hove Albion	2004–05	Championship	39	4	1	0	1	0	―		―		41	4
Brighton & Hove Albion	2005–06	Championship	25	5	0	0	1	0	―		―		26	5
Brighton & Hove Albion	Total		110	35	2	0	4	0	―		6	2	122	37
Swansea City	2005–06	League One	17	8	―		―		―		7 (Note: Four appearances, two goals in Football League Trophy; three appearances, two goals in League One play-offs)	4	24	12
Swansea City	2006–07	League One	11	7	0	0	0	0	―		0	0	11	7
Swansea City	Total		28	15	0	0	0	0	―		7	4	35	19
Barnsley (loan)	2006–07	Championship	9	0	―		―		―		―		9	0
Milton Keynes Dons	2006–07	League Two	16	0	―		―		―		2 (Note: Appearances in League Two play-offs)	0	18	0
Milton Keynes Dons	2007–08	League Two	18	0	0	0	1	1	―		0	0	19	1
Milton Keynes Dons	Total		34	0	0	0	1	1	―		2	0	37	1
Wycombe Wanderers	2007–08	League Two	22	5	―		―		―		2	0	24	5
Rushden & Diamonds	2008–09	Conference Premier	12	4	1	0	―		―		―		13	4
Thrasivoulos	2008–09	Super League Greece	3	0	―		―		―		―		3	0
Hamilton Academical	2009–10	Scottish Premier League	6	0	0	0	1	0	―		―		7	0
Queen of the South	2009–10	Scottish First Division	6	0	―		―		―		―		6	0
Coleraine	2010–11	IFA Premiership	23	14	2	1	―		0	0	0	0	25	15
Coleraine	2011–12	IFA Premiership	20	6	2	1	―		0	0	3 (Note: Appearances in Setanta Sports Cup)	2	25	9
Coleraine	Total		43	20	4	2	―		0	0	3	2	50	24
Glentoran	2011–12	IFA Premiership	9	1	―		―		―		―		9	1
Career total			348	99	10	3	8	0	1	0	24	9	391	111

== Honours ==
Brighton & Hove Albion

- Football League Second Division play-offs: 2004

Swansea City

- Football League Trophy: 2005–06

Milton Keynes Dons

- Football League Two: 2007–08

Individual

- PFA Team of the Year: 2003–04 Second Division
