= Ben Roberts (footballer) =

English footballer and coach

Personal information
- Full name: Ben James Roberts
- Date of birth: 22 June 1975 (age 51)
- Place of birth: Bishop Auckland, England
- Position: Goalkeeper

Team information
- Current team: Chelsea (Head of global goalkeeping)

Senior career*
Years	Team	Apps	(Gls)
1993–2000	Middlesbrough	16	(0)
1995	→ Hartlepool United (loan)	4	(0)
1995	→ Wycombe Wanderers (loan)	15	(0)
1996	→ Bradford City (loan)	2	(0)
1999	→ Millwall (loan)	1	(0)
1999	→ Millwall (loan)	10	(0)
2000	→ Luton Town (loan)	14	(0)
2000–2003	Charlton Athletic	1	(0)
2002	→ Reading (loan)	6	(0)
2002	→ Luton Town (loan)	5	(0)
2003	→ Brighton & Hove Albion (loan)	3	(0)
2003–2005	Brighton & Hove Albion	32	(0)
2007	Derry City	0	(0)
2009–2010	Yeovil Town	1	(0)
Total		110	(0)

International career
1997	England U-21	1	(0)

Managerial career
- 2009–2010: Yeovil Town (goalkeeping coach/chief scout)
- 2010–2015: Charlton Athletic (goalkeeping coach)
- 2015–2022: Brighton & Hove Albion (goalkeeping coach)
- 2022–: Chelsea (Head of global goalkeeping)
- * Club domestic league appearances and goals

Ben James Roberts (born 22 June 1975) is an English former professional footballer who played as a goalkeeper. Since being forced into early retirement in 2005 at the age of 29 through injury, he has become a goalkeeping coach. He is currently the head of global goalkeeping for Chelsea under manager Xabi Alonso.

== Early Career at Middlesbrough ==
Roberts began his career at Middlesbrough F.C. on the Youth Training Scheme in 1991, aged 16, and quickly graduated through the ranks, making his first team debut aged 19 in the Anglo Italia Cup in Ancona. Loan spells at Hartlepool United in 1994, Wycombe Wanderers during the 1994–95 season and Bradford City in 1996 preceded his Premier League debut against Sheffield Wednesday in February 1997.

Also in 1997, Roberts made one appearance for England at under-21 level.

After an injury to Mark Schwarzer, Roberts finished the ill-fated 1996–97 season as Middlesbrough's first-choice goalkeeper, notably playing in the 1997 FA Cup Final, League Cup final replay and the club's remaining Premier League games (Schwarzer was cup-tied for the FA Cup run anyway). He is remembered among Middlesbrough supporters for conceding a goal after only 43 seconds by Roberto Di Matteo of Chelsea in the FA Cup Final.

Roberts' remaining time with Middlesbrough saw him struggle with fitness and injuries, and between back operations he spent time on loan at Millwall and Luton Town in 1999 and 2000. He helped Millwall reach the 1999 Football League Trophy Final, where they lost to Wigan Athletic.

== Later career ==
Roberts transferred to Charlton Athletic in the summer of 2000. While with Charlton, he had further loan spells at Reading, Luton and Brighton & Hove Albion, before making a permanent move to Brighton in 2003. His only appearance for Charlton had come on the last day of the 2002–03 season, Roberts playing as a substitute against Fulham after Dean Kiely was sent off.

Roberts contributed to Brighton's promotion-winning season in 2003–04, making 35 appearances as first-choice goalkeeper, the season culminating in victory in the 2004 Second Division play-off final at the Millennium Stadium against Bristol City.

However, in 2005, a recurrent back injury forced him to retire from playing at the age of 29.

== After retirement ==
After retiring, Roberts went to university, graduating from Roehampton University with a first class honours degree in sports science and coaching, and won the Adidas 'Pursuit of Excellence' award for his dissertation, which was entitled 'A Biomechanical Analysis of a Football Goalkeeper's Jumping Technique'.

== Coaching career ==
In June 2009, having briefly come out of retirement to join Derry City in 2007, Roberts was appointed the goalkeeper coach and chief scout at Yeovil Town. During the two seasons he spent at Yeovil Town, he assisted in the development of goalkeepers Alex McCarthy and Stephen Henderson, making a substitute appearance himself in a 3–3 draw with Swindon Town in October 2010, his first league match in six years.

On 29 December 2010, he left Yeovil Town to return to their League One rivals Charlton Athletic. During his tenure at Charlton, Roberts oversaw the early careers of Rob Elliot, Ben Hamer, Neil Etheridge, Marko Dmitrovic, Dillon Phillips, David Button and Nick Pope.

On 23 June 2015, Roberts returned to Brighton & Hove Albion as goalkeeping coach, succeeding Antti Niemi, who had departed for Finland earlier that summer. During his seven-year spell at the club, Roberts oversaw the development of the goalkeeping department and worked with a number of first-team and academy goalkeepers, including Mat Ryan, David Stockdale, Christian Walton, Robert Sánchez, Tim Krul, Jason Steele, Kjell Scherpen, Carl Rushworth and James Beadle. Several goalkeepers, including Steele and Krul, have credited Roberts with influencing and developing their approach to goalkeeping in interviews.

On 8 September 2022, Roberts followed Graham Potter on a move to Chelsea.

== Outside football ==
After retiring from football in 2005, Roberts took a year out before university to backpack around the world, which included a 6-month spell living in Brazil where he closely studied Brazilian training methods.

He is also a keen runner, taking part in the London Marathon and Great North Run for the Asthma UK charity.

== Honours ==
Middlesbrough

- FA Cup runner-up: 1996–97
- Football League Cup runner-up: 1996–97

Millwall

- Football League Trophy runner-up: 1998–99

Brighton & Hove Albion

- Football League Second Division play-offs: 2004
