= Adam Virgo =

English footballer, pundit, and commentator

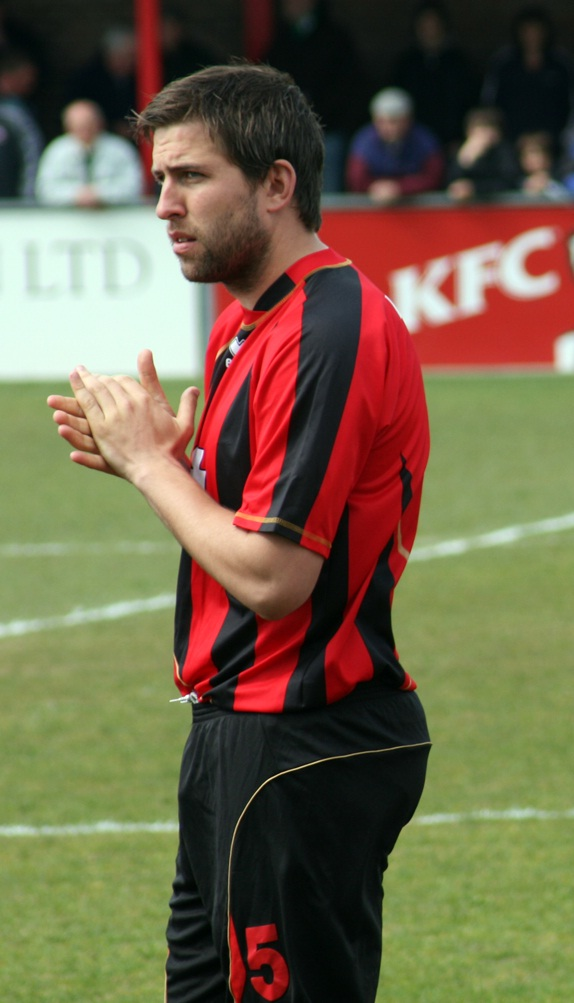
- Virgo in 2010

Personal information
- Full name: Adam John Virgo
- Date of birth: 25 January 1983 (age 43)
- Place of birth: Brighton, England
- Height: 6 ft 2 in (1.88 m)
- Positions: Central defender; utility player

Youth career
- Ardingly College

Senior career*
Years	Team	Apps	(Gls)
2000–2005	Brighton & Hove Albion	73	(9)
2002–2003	→ Exeter City (loan)	9	(0)
2005–2008	Celtic	12	(0)
2006	→ Coventry City (loan)	15	(1)
2007–2008	→ Colchester United (loan)	36	(1)
2008–2010	Brighton & Hove Albion	61	(4)
2010–2011	Yeovil Town	33	(5)
2011–2013	Bristol Rovers	23	(1)
Total		280	(21)

International career
2004–2006	Scotland B	5	(0)
- * Club domestic league appearances and goals

Adam John Virgo (born 25 January 1983) is a former professional footballer, who now works as a pundit and commentator.

== Playing career ==
=== Early career ===
From the age of ten Virgo played for the St. Aubyns Preparatory School 1st XI football team. At 13 he was awarded a sports scholarship to Ardingly College. He then moved to his home town club Brighton. He memorably scored a 120th-minute equaliser against Swindon Town in the 2004 Division Two Play Off Semi Final 2nd leg, to force a penalty shootout. Brighton won the shootout then faced Bristol City at the Millennium Stadium, who they beat to win promotion to the second tier. In the 2004–05 season he earned nationwide coverage on his significant performances that maintained Brighton's position in the Football League Championship.

=== Celtic ===
In July 2005, Virgo completed a move to Celtic for a reported £1.5 million. He remained on the fringes until first-choice centre back Bobo Balde left for Africa Cup of Nations play. In Virgo's second start for Celtic, against Motherwell, he earned man of the match honours from both Setanta and the club.

On 7 August 2006, he completed a season-long loan move to Coventry City, but on 31 August, Virgo was sent back to Celtic to continue his rehabilitation from a knee injury suffered whilst playing for Coventry. He scored once during his spell at Coventry; in a 2–1 loss to Leeds United.

On 17 August 2007, he moved to English Championship side Colchester United on a six-month loan deal. Having earned regular playing time at Colchester United, it was announced on 1 January 2008, that Virgo's loan spell at Colchester United was to be extended until the end of the season. However, the club was relegated and Virgo returned to Celtic. He scored once during his spell at Colchester; in a 3–2 loss to Burnley.

On 13 June 2008, it was announced that Virgo was free to leave Celtic, and seventeen days later, on 30 June 2008, Virgo re-joined Brighton on a free transfer. Virgo made a promising start to the 2008–9 season, netting three goals in his first two competitive appearances as well as making some eye-catching performances. After he left Celtic, he complained that he was not given enough opportunity (just 10 starts) and also that he was not treated properly especially after the death of his father and being attacked in a burglary just a few months later. Three years on, in an interview with vitalfootball.co.uk, Virgo complained that Manager Gordon Strachan lied to him after being persuaded to join Celtic and was dropped in favour of new Chinese player Du Wei after making his first appearance for Celtic. Those claims were denied by the club.

=== Yeovil Town ===
Virgo was informed that his contract would not be renewed at the end of the season and that he will be released by Brighton on 30 June 2010. On 3 July 2010, it was announced that Virgo was training with League One side Yeovil Town. He scored in a pre-season victory against Manchester United Reserves, before signing a one-year contract, five days later After making his debut against Leyton Orient on the opening game of the season, Virgo got his first league goal for his new club when he found the net in an away game at Bristol Rovers. He then found the net twice in a week as he first converted a penalty against Southampton, and then headed a winner at Walsall a few days later. Later in the season, Virgo then bagged two more goals against MK Dons several months later after his recent goal and another came against AFC Bournemouth later towards the end of the season. After a promising season for Yeovil, he was offered a new contract, but decided to leave on a free transfer on 13 June 2011.

=== Bristol Rovers ===
Shortly after his release from Yeovil, Virgo joined Paul Buckle's Bristol Rovers in League Two on a two-year contract. Ahead of the 2011–12 season, Virgo was appointed Vice-Captain of the club, under Matthew Gill. He made his debut live on Sky Sports against Wimbledon on the opening day of the season. He scored a penalty in the 85th minute to win Rovers the game 3–2. After making nine appearances in the 2011–12 season, Virgo suffered a knee injury during training and had to undergo surgery. Following his recovery from injury, Virgo told BBC Radio Bristol that he was relieved to continue his football career after a career-threatening injury.

In 2012–13 season, Virgo played his first match in over six-months, in the opening game of the season, a 2–0 loss against Oxford United. Virgo was a regular in the first team, in the first six matches of the season, but by late October he soon suffered another knee injury. One month later it was announced he would be out for the remainder of the 2012/13 season. Though he had been told his time at Bristol Rovers was over, Virgo (along with Scott Bevan) remained at the club until they recovered from their injuries. In July 2013 it was announced that Virgo and Bevan had left the club, despite being offered the opportunity to finish their rehabilitation periods.

Following this, Virgo trained with Crawley Town and made a substitute appearance in their pre-season friendly against Millwall.

== International career ==
Born and raised in Brighton in southern England, Virgo qualified to play for either England or Scotland. He was selected twice by Scotland at B international level.

== Post-playing career ==
Virgo now commentates for National League games on TNT Sport.

== Honours ==
Brighton & Hove Albion

- Football League Second Division: 2001–02; play-offs: 2004
- Football League Third Division: 2000–01

Celtic

- Scottish Premier League: 2005–06
- Scottish League Cup: 2005–06
