= 2008–09 Huddersfield Town A.F.C. season =

Huddersfield Town
2008–09 season
- Chairman: Ken Davy; Dean Hoyle (Chairman-Elect)
- Manager: Stan Ternent (until 4 November 2008); Gerry Murphy (from 4 November 2008 until 15 December 2008); Graham Mitchell (13 December 2008); Lee Clark (from 15 December 2008)
- Stadium: Kirklees Stadium
- Football League One: 9th
- FA Cup: First round (eliminated by Port Vale)
- League Cup: Second round (eliminated by Sheffield United)
- League Trophy: Second round (eliminated by Darlington)
- Top goalscorer: League: Michael Collins; Gary Roberts (9 each); All: Gary Roberts (11)
- Highest home attendance: 20,928 vs Leeds United (14 February 2009)
- Lowest home attendance: 6,942 vs Port Vale (8 November 2008)
- Biggest win: 4–0 vs Bradford City (12 August 2008)
- Biggest defeat: 0–4 vs Peterborough United (25 October 2008)
Home colours	Away colours

Huddersfield Town's 2008–09 campaign was the club's centenary season. The season did not end in promotion and if things had been left alone, relegation may have been a possibility.

After the disastrous start under Stan Ternent, Gerry Murphy led a recovery which continued under the new management team of Lee Clark, Terry McDermott, Derek Fazackerley and Steve Black.

They eventually finished in 9th place, but the season was noted mainly for it being the first time in 78 years that Town had completed the double over local rivals Leeds United, as well as for the retirement of local legend Andy Booth, who made 457 appearances over 2 spells at the club, scoring 150 goals, putting him in the top 5 of both appearances and goals in the club's history.

== Squad at the start of the season ==
Note: Flags indicate national team as defined under FIFA eligibility rules; some limited exceptions apply. Players may hold more than one non-FIFA nationality.

No.	Pos.	Nation	Player
2	DF	ENG	Andy Holdsworth
3	DF	ENG	Joe Skarz
4	MF	IRL	Michael Collins
5	DF	ENG	David Mirfin
6	DF	ENG	Nathan Clarke
7	FW	SCO	Keigan Parker
8	MF	ENG	Jon Worthington
9	FW	ENG	Danny Cadamarteri
10	MF	WAL	Michael Flynn
11	MF	IRL	Jim Goodwin
12	DF	ENG	Tom Clarke
14	FW	ENG	Phil Jevons
15	MF	SLE	Malvin Kamara
16	DF	ENG	Robbie Williams

No.	Pos.	Nation	Player
17	MF	ENG	Gary Roberts
18	DF	ENG	Andy Butler
19	FW	ENG	Luke Beckett
20	DF	ENG	Chris Lucketti (Captain)
22	MF	IRL	James Berrett
23	FW	ENG	Andy Booth
24	FW	ENG	Tom Denton
26	GK	ENG	Simon Eastwood
27	GK	ENG	Matt Glennon
28	GK	ENG	Alex Smithies
31	DF	ENG	Shane Killock
32	FW	ENG	Daniel Broadbent
33	DF	ENG	Daniel Codman

== Review ==
On 6 May 2008, following the mixed season, new manager Stan Ternent released nine players from the club. They were Chris Brandon, Danny Schofield (who had already announced his plans to leave), Frank Sinclair, Matty Young, Aaron Hardy, Danny Racchi, Lucas Akins, Mitchell Bailey and Luke Malcher. Matt Glennon, Joe Skarz and James Berrett were offered new deals, while captain Rob Page had signed a pre-contract agreement with League 2 side Chesterfield, much to the disappointment of Ternent, who hadn't had chance to offer him a new contract at the Galpharm Stadium. The following day, Danny Schofield agreed a pre-contract agreement with fellow League 1 side Yeovil Town. On that same day, Matt Glennon signed a two-year contract with an optional third year and then Joe Skarz put pen to paper on his new three-year contract, the day after that. Recently called-up Ireland U-21 international James Berrett signed his new two-year deal on 13 May. On 30 May, Chris Brandon completed a move to his hometown club Bradford City. On 1 July, Frank Sinclair re-joined ex-Town manager Peter Jackson at Lincoln City. On 7 July, Matty Young joined Conference North side Harrogate Town. Aaron Hardy joined him there on 26 July. On 22 July, Lucas Akins made a surprise move to newly promoted Scottish Premier League side Hamilton Academical. 6 days later, Danny Racchi joined Bury. Mitchell Bailey joined Conference North side Hyde United on 7 August. On 11 August, central defender David Mirfin joined fellow League 1 side Scunthorpe United in a deal worth £150,000. Young defender Shane Killock joined Conference North side Harrogate Town on a month's loan on 1 September. He returned to Town on 7 October. He was loaned out to Oxford United on 2 January 2009. He signed a permanent deal at the Kassam Stadium on 3 February. Sierra Leonean international Malvin Kamara joined Football League Two side Grimsby Town on a month's loan on 24 September. He returned to the Galpharm on 25 October. On 23 October, Tom Clarke moved across West Yorkshire to Bradford City on a month's loan. The loan was extended, but he was recalled by Town on 3 December. On 27 November, Town sent 3 players out on loan just before the end of the transfer deadline window. Michael Flynn joined League 2 side Darlington and young duo Simon Eastwood and Tom Denton joined Conference National side Woking. Flynn returned to the Terriers on 29 December, Denton returned in January and Eastwood returned following an injury to Matt Glennon. Meanwhile, striker Luke Beckett left the club and joined Conference North side Gainsborough Trinity until the end of the season. Luke Malcher joined Harrogate Town on 11 December. Young striker Daniel Broadbent joined Rushden & Diamonds on loan on 15 January, he returned to the Galpharm on 16 February. 3 days later, he joined Town's new signing, Lee Novak, on loan at Gateshead, before returning on 19 March. On 24 March, he joined Harrogate Town on loan. Ex-captain Jon Worthington joined fellow League 1 side Yeovil Town on 30 January on a month's loan, which was extended, before he returned on 26 March. Keigan Parker joined fellow League 1 side Hartlepool United on loan on 2 March. Tom Denton joined his previous club Wakefield on loan on 6 March. He was joined there by fellow youngster Dan Codman on 10 March. Striker Phil Jevons joined League Two side Bury on a month's loan on 23 March. Joe Skarz joined Keigan Parker on loan at Hartlepool United on 26 March, as the loan window closed. David Unsworth, signed by Ternent at the start of the season was released from his contract on 30 March.

On 27 May, Stan Ternent made his first signing as Huddersfield Town manager. He signed Scottish striker Keigan Parker on a free transfer from Championship side Blackpool. On 5 June, Irish international Jim Goodwin joined Town on a 3-year deal from recently relegated Scunthorpe United. On 13 June, Huddersfield were drawn at home to rivals Bradford City in the first round of the League Cup. 3 days later, the new Football League fixtures were announced, Town's first game would be a home tie against recently promoted Stockport County. On 2 July, Town signed the ex-Scunthorpe United defender Andy Butler on a 3-year deal. Two days later, Chris Lucketti was brought back to Huddersfield from Sheffield United on a two-year contract, 7 years after leaving the Galpharm Stadium. On 23 July, Ternent made his fifth signing by bringing in Welshman Michael Flynn from Blackpool. Six days later, Gary Roberts joined from Ipswich Town for £250,000. On 8 August, just one day before the new season began, ex-Everton & West Ham United defender David Unsworth signed from Burnley, becoming Stan Ternent's 7th signing since becoming manager at the Galpharm. Also that day, Town were given a bye into the second round of the Football League Trophy. On 15 August, young striker Tom Denton was signed for £60,000 from Wakefield. Stan Ternent signed attacking midfielder Ian Craney for an undisclosed fee from Football League Two side Accrington Stanley on 18 August. The following day, striker Liam Dickinson was signed on loan from Championship side Derby County. That loan was extended by another month on 22 September. He eventually stayed until 17 November, when the 93-day limit expired. Stan Ternent also revealed on 5 September, that Town had failed to capture 3 strikers during the summer. They failed on bid of £850,000 for Town hero Jon Stead, who joined Ipswich Town in September, a £400,000 bid for Colchester United's Clive Platt and a £600,000 bid for Ipswich Town's Alan Lee, who subsequently moved to Championship side Crystal Palace. On 17 October, Town signed Steve Jones on loan from Burnley as cover for Andy Booth, who is out until the New Year with a back injury. He returned to Turf Moor on 26 November. On 20 January, Lee Clark made his first signing as manager by signing German left-back Dominik Werling on a free transfer. On 23 January, manager Clark made a double signing with the capture of winger Anthony Pilkington from Stockport County and striker Lionel Ainsworth from Watford. As the transfer deadline closed, Clark made three more signings, Lee Novak from Gateshead, who was then immediately sent back to Gateshead for the rest of the season. Jonathan Téhoué was signed on a free transfer from Turkish side Konyaspor. On 13 February, 11 days after the deal was originally agreed, Polish striker Lukas Jutkiewicz joined Town on loan from Premier League side Everton until the end of the season. Young Liverpool defender Martin Kelly was brought in on loan on 26 March, as the loan window shut.

After a disappointing opening to the season with a 1–1 draw against Stockport County, Town trounced neighbours Bradford City, on 12 August, 4–0 in the first round of the League Cup, with new signing Gary Roberts scoring a brace. Huddersfield were drawn at home to Championship side Sheffield United in the second round. They narrowly lost the tie by 2 goals to 1. Michael Flynn gave Town the lead with a deflected shot after 34 minutes. But, 2 goals in the last 10 minutes from the Blades from Darius Henderson and Kyle Naughton sent Town crashing out in the cruelest of fashions. On 6 September, Town were drawn away to League Two side Darlington in the second round of the Football League Trophy North-East section. They lost that match 1–0 on 7 October. In the FA Cup first round, Town were given a home tie against League Two side Port Vale. That match took place on 8 November and saw Town let a 3–1 lead slip to lose 4–3.

On 4 November, Stan Ternent left the Galpharm Stadium after just over 6 months in charge of the Terriers. To date, that is the shortest reign of any manager, with the exception of John Haselden and all the caretaker managers, in the club's 100-year history.

On 15 November, Murphy was in charge of his first league game in his 3rd spell as caretaker manager with a trip to Elland Road to play high-flyers and rivals Leeds United. Despite falling behind to a Robert Snodgrass goal in the 4th minute, Town scored a goal 27 seconds into the second half through Joe Skarz and then in the second minute of added time, Michael Collins scored to give Town a 2–1 win, which was also their first win at Elland Road since Boxing Day 1983.

On 10 December, after weeks of speculation, compensation was agreed with Norwich City for their assistant manager Lee Clark to be appointed as manager, with Derek Fazackerley as his new first team coach. They signed the contracts the following day and Clark officially took over on 15 December. The following week, Terry McDermott became the new assistant manager. Clark's first match was a home game against Hereford United on 20 December, which Town won 2–0. Clark's initial reign went well, winning 8 out of 9 matches soon after taking over. However, immediately after a 1–0 win over local rivals Leeds United once again, scoring in the first half and managing to keep the Whites out of the net under constant pressure, which once again placed them above Leeds in the table, disaster struck and a bad spell resulted in 8 consecutive games without a win, conceding 3 vital last minute goals 3 weeks in succession. The gap between Town and the playoffs widened, and a late bounce back was only enough to place them 9th in the table by the end of the season.

== Squad at the end of the season ==
Note: Flags indicate national team as defined under FIFA eligibility rules; some limited exceptions apply. Players may hold more than one non-FIFA nationality.

No.	Pos.	Nation	Player
2	DF	ENG	Andy Holdsworth
3	DF	ENG	Joe Skarz (on loan at Hartlepool United)
4	MF	IRL	Michael Collins
5	MF	ENG	Ian Craney
6	DF	ENG	Nathan Clarke
7	FW	SCO	Keigan Parker (on loan at Hartlepool United)
8	MF	ENG	Jon Worthington
9	FW	ENG	Danny Cadamarteri
10	MF	WAL	Michael Flynn
11	MF	IRL	Jim Goodwin
12	DF	ENG	Tom Clarke
14	FW	ENG	Phil Jevons (on loan at Bury)
15	MF	SLE	Malvin Kamara
16	DF	ENG	Robbie Williams
17	MF	ENG	Gary Roberts
18	DF	ENG	Andy Butler
19	MF	IRL	Anthony Pilkington

No.	Pos.	Nation	Player
20	DF	ENG	Chris Lucketti (Captain)
22	MF	IRL	James Berrett
23	FW	ENG	Andy Booth
24	FW	ENG	Tom Denton (on loan at Wakefield)
25	DF	GER	Dominik Werling
26	GK	ENG	Simon Eastwood
27	GK	ENG	Matt Glennon
28	GK	ENG	Alex Smithies
29	DF	ENG	Martin Kelly (on loan from Liverpool)
30	DF	ENG	Liam Ridehalgh
32	FW	ENG	Daniel Broadbent (on loan at Harrogate Town)
33	DF	ENG	Daniel Codman (on loan at Wakefield)
34	MF	ENG	Lionel Ainsworth
35	FW	ENG	Lee Novak (on loan at Gateshead)
36	FW	POL	Lukas Jutkiewicz (on loan from Everton)
37	FW	FRA	Jonathan Téhoué

== Players in and out ==
=== In ===
Date	Player	Previous club	Cost
27 May	(Scotland) Keigan Parker	Blackpool	Free
5 June	(Republic of Ireland) Jim Goodwin	Scunthorpe United	Free
2 July	(England) Andy Butler	Scunthorpe United	Free
4 July	(England) Chris Lucketti	Sheffield United	Free
23 July	(Wales) Michael Flynn	Blackpool	Free
29 July	(England) Gary Roberts	Ipswich Town	£250,000
8 August	(England) David Unsworth	Burnley	Free
15 August	(England) Tom Denton	Wakefield	£50,000
18 August	(England) Ian Craney	Accrington Stanley	Undisclosed Fee
19 August	(England) Liam Dickinson	Derby County	Loan
7 October	(England) Shane Killock	Harrogate Town	Loan Return
17 October	(Northern Ireland) Steve Jones	Burnley	Loan
25 October	(Sierra Leone) Malvin Kamara	Grimsby Town	Loan Return
3 December	(England) Tom Clarke	Bradford City	Loan Return
29 December	(Wales) Michael Flynn	Darlington	Loan Return
20 January	(Germany) Dominik Werling	FC Erzgebirge Aue	Free
23 January	(England) Lionel Ainsworth	Watford	Undisclosed Fee
23 January	(Republic of Ireland) Anthony Pilkington	Stockport County	Undisclosed Fee
30 January	(England) Tom Denton	Woking	Loan Return
2 February	(England) Lee Novak	Gateshead	Undisclosed Fee
2 February	(France) Jonathan Téhoué	Konyaspor	Free
13 February	(Poland) Lukas Jutkiewicz	Everton	Loan
16 February	(England) Daniel Broadbent	Rushden & Diamonds	Loan Return
24 February	(England) Simon Eastwood	Woking	Loan Return
19 March	(England) Daniel Broadbent	Gateshead	Loan Return
26 March	(England) Martin Kelly	Liverpool	Loan
26 March	(England) Jon Worthington	Yeovil Town	Loan Return
2 May	(England) Daniel Broadbent	Harrogate Town	Loan Return
2 May	(England) Dan Codman	Wakefield	Loan Return
2 May	(England) Tom Denton	Wakefield	Loan Return
2 May	(Scotland) Keigan Parker	Hartlepool United	Loan Return
2 May	(England) Joe Skarz	Hartlepool United	Loan Return
8 May	(England) Lee Novak	Gateshead	Loan Return
10 May	(England) Phil Jevons	Bury	Loan Return

=== Out ===
Date	Player	New Club	Cost
5 May	(Wales) Rob Page	Chesterfield	Free
7 May	(England) Danny Schofield	Yeovil Town	Free
30 May	(England) Chris Brandon	Bradford City	Free
1 July	(Jamaica) Frank Sinclair	Lincoln City	Free
7 July	(England) Matty Young	Harrogate Town	Free
22 July	(England) Lucas Akins	Hamilton Academical	Free
26 July	(England) Aaron Hardy	Harrogate Town	Free
28 July	(England) Danny Racchi	Bury	Free
7 August	(England) Mitchell Bailey	Hyde United	Free
11 August	(England) David Mirfin	Scunthorpe United	£150,000
1 September	(England) Shane Killock	Harrogate Town	Loan
24 September	(Sierra Leone) Malvin Kamara	Grimsby Town	Loan
23 October	(England) Tom Clarke	Bradford City	Loan
17 November	(England) Liam Dickinson	Derby County	Loan Return
26 November	(Northern Ireland) Steve Jones	Burnley	Loan Return
27 November	(England) Luke Beckett	Gainsborough Trinity	Free
27 November	(Wales) Michael Flynn	Darlington	Loan
27 November	(England) Tom Denton	Woking	Loan
27 November	(England) Simon Eastwood	Woking	Loan
11 December	(Republic of Ireland) Luke Malcher	Harrogate Town	Free
2 January	(England) Shane Killock	Oxford United	Loan
15 January	(England) Daniel Broadbent	Rushden & Diamonds	Loan
30 January	(England) Jon Worthington	Yeovil Town	Loan
2 February	(England) Lee Novak	Gateshead	Loan
3 February	(England) Shane Killock	Oxford United	Free
19 February	(England) Daniel Broadbent	Gateshead	Loan
2 March	(Scotland) Keigan Parker	Hartlepool United	Loan
6 March	(England) Tom Denton	Wakefield	Loan
10 March	(England) Dan Codman	Wakefield	Loan
23 March	(England) Phil Jevons	Bury	Loan
24 March	(England) Daniel Broadbent	Harrogate Town	Loan
26 March	(England) Joe Skarz	Hartlepool United	Loan
1 April	(England) David Unsworth	Retired	Released
2 May	(England) Andy Booth	Retired	Released

== Final league table ==
Pos	Team	Pld	W	D	L	GF	GA	GD	Pts
7	Tranmere Rovers	46	21	11	14	62	49	+13	74
8	Southend United	46	21	8	17	58	61	−3	71
9	Huddersfield Town	46	18	14	14	62	65	−3	68
10	Oldham Athletic	46	16	17	13	66	65	+1	65
11	Bristol Rovers	46	17	12	17	79	61	+18	63

Updated to match(es) played on 2 May 2009. Source: The Football League
Rules for classification: 1) points; 2) goal difference; 3) number of goals scored.

== Results ==
=== Pre-season matches ===
Date	Competition	Opponents	Home/ Away	Result F – A	Scorers	Attendance
19 July 2008	Friendly match	Bury	A	1 – 1	Codman [81]	?
22 July 2008	Friendly match	A.F.C. Emley	A	8 – 0	N. Clarke [5, 72], Berrett [8], Jevons [15, 31], Butler [44], Parker [47], Williams [60]	1,927
26 July 2008	Hartlepool United Centenary Tournament Semi-Final	Hamilton Academical	N	1 – 2	Booth [50]	550
27 July 2008	Hartlepool United Centenary Tournament 3rd Place Play-Off	Hartlepool United	N	0 – 1		?
2 August 2008	Friendly match	Sheffield United	H	2 – 1	Cadamarteri [28], Parker [79]	4,146
6 August 2008	Centenary Match – The Herbert Chapman Trophy	Arsenal	H	1 – 2	Berrett [75]	19,044

=== Football League One ===
Date	Opponents	Home/ Away	Result F – A	Scorers	Attendance	Position
9 August 2008	Stockport County	H	1 – 1	Booth [30]	15,578	11th
16 August 2008	Colchester United	A	0 – 0		5,340	17th
23 August 2008	Milton Keynes Dons	H	1 – 3	Roberts [83]	13,189	23rd
30 August 2008	Millwall	A	1 – 2	Dickinson [18]	7,513	24th
6 September 2008	Cheltenham Town	A	2 – 1	N. Clarke [57], Craney [67]	3,587	17th
13 September 2008	Tranmere Rovers	H	1 – 2	Dickinson [17]	13,352	22nd
20 September 2008	Northampton Town	H	3 – 2	Booth [34], Flynn [64, 78]	12,414	15th
27 September 2008	Oldham Athletic	A	1 – 1	Craney [29]	7,418	15th
4 October 2008	Leicester City	H	2 – 3	Roberts [69], Dickinson [77]	16,212	17th
11 October 2008	Swindon Town	A	3 – 1	Dickinson [6], Roberts [26], Flynn [69]	7,071	15th
18 October 2008	Bristol Rovers	H	1 – 1	Flynn [7]	13,779	16th
21 October 2008	Hartlepool United	A	3 – 5	Dickinson [8, 44], Craney [38]	3,771	16th
25 October 2008	Peterborough United	A	0 – 4		7,064	19th
28 October 2008	Yeovil Town	H	0 – 0		10,719	19th
1 November 2008	Crewe Alexandra	H	3 – 2	Butler [20], Craney [39], Parker [88]	11,679	16th
15 November 2008	Leeds United	A	2 – 1	Skarz [46], Collins [90]	32,028	14th
22 November 2008	Brighton & Hove Albion	A	1 – 0	Collins [50]	6,461	13th
25 November 2008	Leyton Orient	H	0 – 1		10,414	14th
6 December 2008	Walsall	H	2 – 1	Roberts [26 (pen)], Collins [90]	11,827	12th
13 December 2008	Southend United	A	1 – 0	Craney [48]	8,382	10th
20 December 2008	Hereford United	H	2 – 0	N. Clarke [70], Roberts [77]	13,070	10th
26 December 2008	Carlisle United	A	0 – 3		7,883	10th
28 December 2008	Scunthorpe United	H	2 – 0	Goodwin [65], Roberts [90]	15,228	10th
3 January 2009	Oldham Athletic	H	1 – 1	Collins [66]	16,951	10th
10 January 2009	Northampton Town	A	1 – 1	Jevons [65]	5,110	9th
17 January 2009	Swindon Town	H	2 – 1	Collins [51], Butler [60]	13,414	8th
24 January 2009	Leicester City	A	2 – 4	Jevons [6], Parker [51]	21,311	10th
27 January 2009	Yeovil Town	A	0 – 1		3,703	10th
31 January 2009	Peterborough United	H	1 – 0	Collins [35]	14,480	10th
3 February 2009	Hartlepool United	H	1 – 1	Nelson [9 (og)]	9,294	9th
14 February 2009	Leeds United	H	1 – 0	N. Clarke [16]	20,928	9th
21 February 2009	Crewe Alexandra	A	1 – 3	Berrett [30]	5,056	10th
28 February 2009	Stockport County	A	1 – 1	Collins [16]	7,739	10th
3 March 2009	Colchester United	H	2 – 2	Pilkington [51], Roberts [66]	10,580	10th
7 March 2009	Millwall	H	1 – 2	Roberts [74]	13,196	11th
10 March 2009	Milton Keynes Dons	A	1 – 1	Butler [80]	9,707	12th
14 March 2009	Tranmere Rovers	A	1 – 3	Booth [23]	5,515	13th
21 March 2009	Cheltenham Town	H	2 – 2	Cadamarteri [40], Butler [90]	11,516	14th
28 March 2009	Hereford United	A	1 – 0	Collins [72]	2,979	14th
31 March 2009	Bristol Rovers	A	2 – 1	Pilkington [70], Cadamarteri [78]	6,286	11th
4 April 2009	Southend United	H	0 – 1		12,203	12th
10 April 2009	Scunthorpe United	A	2 – 1	T. Clarke [26], Roberts [54]	5,543	10th
13 April 2009	Carlisle United	H	1 – 0	Booth [78]	12,309	9th
18 April 2009	Walsall	A	3 – 2	Booth [43, 45], Kelly [62]	3,951	9th
25 April 2009	Brighton & Hove Albion	H	2 – 2	Booth [16], Collins [57]	14,740	9th
2 May 2009	Leyton Orient	A	1 – 1	Booth [24]	5,371	9th

=== FA Cup ===
Date	Round	Opponents	Home/ Away	Result F – A	Scorers	Attendance
8 November 2008	Round 1	Port Vale	H	3 – 4	Collins [45], Craney [51], Williams [65]	6,942

=== Football League Cup ===
Date	Round	Opponents	Home/ Away	Result F – A	Scorers	Attendance
12 August 2008	Round 1	Bradford City	H	4 – 0	Worthington [48], Roberts [62, 80], Williams [75]	8,932
27 August 2008	Round 2	Sheffield United	H	1 – 2	Flynn [34]	15,189

=== Football League Trophy ===
Date	Round	Opponents	Home/ Away	Result F – A	Scorers	Attendance
2 September 2008	Round 1 North East	Bye into Round 2
7 October 2008	Round 2 North East	Darlington	A	0 – 1		1,791

== Appearances & goals ==
Correct as of 2 May 2009.

Squad No.	Name	Nationality	Position	League		FA Cup		League Cup		Football League Trophy		Total	
Squad No.	Name	Nationality	Position	Apps	Goals	Apps	Goals	Apps	Goals	Apps	Goals	Apps	Goals
2	Andy Holdsworth	England	DF	30 (4)	0	1	0	2	0	1	0	34 (4)	0
3	Joe Skarz	England	DF	9	1	1	0	0	0	0 (1)	0	10 (1)	1
4	Michael Collins	Republic of Ireland	MF	34 (2)	9	1	1	0 (1)	0	1	0	36 (3)	10
5	Ian Craney	England	MF	23 (11)	5	1	1	0	0	0	0	24 (11)	6
6	Nathan Clarke	England	DF	38	3	1	0	1	0	0	0	40	3
7	Keigan Parker	Scotland	FW	14 (6)	2	0	0	1 (1)	0	1	0	16 (7)	2
8	Jon Worthington	England	MF	12 (7)	0	0	0	2	1	0 (1)	0	14 (8)	1
9	Danny Cadamarteri	England	FW	24 (8)	2	0 (1)	0	2	0	1	0	27 (9)	2
10	Michael Flynn	Wales	MF	18 (7)	4	0	0	2	1	0	0	20 (7)	5
11	Jim Goodwin	Republic of Ireland	MF	35 (2)	1	1	0	1 (1)	0	0	0	37 (3)	1
12	Tom Clarke	England	DF	11 (4)	1	0	0	0	0	1	0	12 (4)	1
14	Phil Jevons	England	FW	12 (11)	2	1	0	0 (1)	0	0	0	13 (12)	2
15	Malvin Kamara	Sierra Leone	MF	0 (2)	0	0	0	0 (2)	0	0	0	0 (4)	0
16	Robbie Williams	England	DF	31 (4)	0	1	1	2	1	1	0	35 (4)	2
17	Gary Roberts	England	MF	43	9	1	0	2	2	1	0	47	11
18	Andy Butler	England	DF	42	4	1	0	1	0	0 (1)	0	44 (1)	4
19	Luke Beckett	England	FW	0 (1)	0	0	0	2	0	0	0	2 (1)	0
19	Anthony Pilkington	Republic of Ireland	MF	16	2	0	0	0	0	0	0	16	2
20	Chris Lucketti	England	DF	12 (1)	0	0	0	2	0	1	0	15 (1)	0
21	David Unsworth	England	DF	4	0	0	0	0	0	1	0	5	0
22	James Berrett	Republic of Ireland	MF	8 (1)	1	0	0	0	0	1	0	9 (1)	1
23	Andy Booth	England	FW	9 (11)	8	0	0	0	0	0	0	9 (11)	8
25	Steve Jones	Northern Ireland	FW	2 (2)	0	0	0	0	0	0	0	2 (2)	0
25	Dominik Werling	Germany	DF	0 (3)	0	0	0	0	0	0	0	0 (3)	0
26	Simon Eastwood	England	GK	1	0	0	0	0	0	0	0	1	0
27	Matt Glennon	England	GK	18	0	1	0	2	0	0	0	21	0
28	Alex Smithies	England	GK	27	0	0	0	0	0	1	0	28	0
29	Liam Dickinson	England	FW	13	6	0	0	0	0	0	0	13	6
29	Martin Kelly	England	DF	7	1	0	0	0	0	0	0	7	1
32	Daniel Broadbent	England	FW	0 (1)	0	0	0	0	0	0	0	0 (1)	0
34	Lionel Ainsworth	England	MF	7 (7)	0	0	0	0	0	0	0	7 (7)	0
36	Lukas Jutkiewicz	Poland	FW	6 (1)	0	0	0	0	0	0	0	6 (1)	0
