= 2009–10 Huddersfield Town A.F.C. season =

Huddersfield Town
2009–10 season
- Chairman: Dean Hoyle
- Manager: Lee Clark
- Stadium: Kirklees Stadium
- Football League One: 6th
- Play-offs: Semi-finals (eliminated by Millwall)
- FA Cup: Third round (eliminated by West Bromwich Albion)
- League Cup: Second round (eliminated by Newcastle United)
- League Trophy: Second round (eliminated by Chesterfield)
- Top goalscorer: League: Jordan Rhodes (19); All: Jordan Rhodes (23)
- Highest home attendance: 21,764 vs Leeds United (27 February 2010)
- Lowest home attendance: 5,120 vs Stockport County (11 August 2009)
- Biggest win: 7–1 vs Brighton & Hove Albion (18 August 2009); 6–0 vs Wycombe Wanderers (14 November 2009); 6–0 vs Stockport County (24 April 2010)
- Biggest defeat: 0–5 vs Southampton (2 March 2010)
Home colours	Away colours

Huddersfield Town's 2009–10 campaign was the club's first full season under the chairmanship of Dean Hoyle, with manager Lee Clark in his first full season in charge of the team. They finished in 6th place, before losing to Millwall in the play-offs.

== Squad at the start of the season ==
Note: Flags indicate national team as defined under FIFA eligibility rules; some limited exceptions apply. Players may hold more than one non-FIFA nationality.

No.	Pos.	Nation	Player
1	GK	ENG	Alex Smithies
2	DF	ENG	Lee Peltier
3	DF	ENG	Joe Skarz
4	MF	IRL	Michael Collins
5	DF	ENG	Peter Clarke (Captain)
6	DF	ENG	Nathan Clarke
7	MF	ENG	Gary Roberts
8	MF	ENG	Antony Kay
9	FW	JAM	Theo Robinson
10	FW	ENG	Robbie Simpson
11	MF	IRL	Jim Goodwin
12	DF	ENG	Tom Clarke
14	FW	ENG	Phil Jevons (on loan at Morecambe)
15	MF	ENG	Ian Craney (on loan at Morecambe)
16	DF	ENG	Robbie Williams

No.	Pos.	Nation	Player
17	FW	SCO	Jordan Rhodes
18	DF	ENG	Andy Butler
19	MF	IRL	Anthony Pilkington
20	DF	ENG	Chris Lucketti
21	FW	ENG	Lee Novak
22	MF	IRL	James Berrett
24	FW	ENG	Tom Denton (on loan at Cheltenham Town)
26	GK	ENG	Simon Eastwood
27	GK	ENG	Matt Glennon
28	MF	ENG	Lionel Ainsworth
29	DF	ENG	Liam Ridehalgh
30	MF	ENG	Lewis Nightingale
31	DF	ENG	Spencer Harris
32	DF	ENG	Jack Hunt
33	DF	ENG	Leigh Franks

== Review ==
After the end of the centenary season, Dean Hoyle made wholesale changes at the club. As well as the retirement of Andy Booth, Clark released Jon Worthington, Malvin Kamara, Dominik Werling, Daniel Broadbent, Dan Codman. Danny Cadamarteri and Andy Holdsworth both rejected new deals and subsequently left the club. Cadamarteri joined Scottish Premier League side Dundee United, then a week later, ex-captain Worthington joined fellow League One side Oldham Athletic. On 16 July, young striker Tom Denton joined Football League Two side Cheltenham Town on a six-month loan deal. He returned to the club on 10 November, two months earlier than anticipated. On 22 July, midfielder Ian Craney and striker Phil Jevons joined League Two side Morecambe on season-long loans. Unfortunately, an injury cut short half of Craney's season, and he returned to the Galpharm on 20 April. The following day, his contract at the club was terminated. Also that day, Keigan Parker and Andy Holdsworth joined Oldham Athletic, following Jon Worthington. On 25 July, young goalkeeper Simon Eastwood joined Bradford City on loan until the end of the year. He returned to the Galpharm on 31 December. On 4 August, Eastwood was joined at Bradford by Michael Flynn after terminating his contract at the Galpharm. Kamara joined Conference National side Barrow on 25 September. On 14 December, young defender Spencer Harris moved to Northern Premier League Division One North side Curzon Ashton on a month's loan. On 1 January 2010, midfielder Jim Goodwin joined Oldham Athletic on a month's loan, which was extended to the end of the season on 1 February. On 7 January, defender Andy Butler joined Championship side Blackpool on loan until the end of the season. On 13 January, goalkeeper Matt Glennon terminated his contract with the Terriers, so he could join Bradford City on a permanent deal. On 21 January, left-back Joe Skarz joined League Two side Shrewsbury Town on loan until the end of the season. The following day, 2 of the team's youngsters, Jack Hunt & Leigh Franks were sent on loan to Conference National side Grays Athletic and Conference North side Fleetwood Town respectively. On 27 January, Lionel Ainsworth joined fellow League One side Brentford on a month's loan, which was extended to the end of the season on 1 February. On 1 February, Tom Denton and Lewis Nightingale joined Northern Premier League Division One North side Wakefield on one-month loans. On 17 March, young defender Spencer Harris was released from his contract, then signed for Ossett Town. On 17 May 2010, former captain Chris Lucketti left the club.

Charity kit worn against Southend United, 16 January 2010, in Yorkshire Air Ambulance colours.

On 29 May, Clark made his first signing of the summer, by bringing in Tranmere Rovers captain Antony Kay on a free transfer. On 12 June, Clark signed defender Peter Clarke on a free transfer from Southend United. On 18 June, Coventry City striker Robbie Simpson was signed for £300,000 on a three-year deal. On 30 June, Lee Peltier was signed from Yeovil Town on a three-year contract for an undisclosed fee. On 3 July, young striker Theo Robinson was signed from Football League Championship side Watford for an undisclosed fee on a three-year deal. On 31 July, Ipswich Town striker Jordan Rhodes joined the Terriers on a four-year deal for an undisclosed fee. On 14 August, Clark signed Manchester United and England U-19 midfielder Danny Drinkwater on a season-long loan from Old Trafford. On 19 January, Birmingham City defender Krystian Pearce joined on an original emergency loan, to be made into a permanent deal. On 22 January, Lee Clark bolstered his defensive options further with the loan signing of Preston North End's Neal Trotman. On 28 January, Clark made a double signing, Australian international Dean Heffernan signed until the end of the season from A-League side Central Coast Mariners and young striker Nathan Eccleston signed on a month's loan from Liverpool. On 18 February, after impressing on a trial, young midfielder Taser Hassan signed a contract with the Terriers until the end of the season.

Town finished in 6th place, meaning that they played Millwall in the play-offs. After a goalless first leg at the Galpharm, Huddersfield lost the second leg 2–0 at The New Den, meaning that they stay in League One for another season.

== Squad at the end of the season ==
Note: Flags indicate national team as defined under FIFA eligibility rules; some limited exceptions apply. Players may hold more than one non-FIFA nationality.

No.	Pos.	Nation	Player
1	GK	ENG	Alex Smithies
2	DF	ENG	Lee Peltier
3	DF	ENG	Joe Skarz
4	MF	IRL	Michael Collins
5	DF	ENG	Peter Clarke (Captain)
6	DF	ENG	Nathan Clarke
7	MF	ENG	Gary Roberts
8	MF	ENG	Antony Kay
9	FW	JAM	Theo Robinson
10	FW	ENG	Robbie Simpson
11	MF	IRL	Jim Goodwin
12	DF	ENG	Tom Clarke
13	DF	AUS	Dean Heffernan
14	FW	ENG	Phil Jevons (on loan at Morecambe)
16	DF	ENG	Robbie Williams
17	FW	SCO	Jordan Rhodes

No.	Pos.	Nation	Player
18	DF	ENG	Andy Butler (on loan at Blackpool)
19	MF	IRL	Anthony Pilkington
21	FW	ENG	Lee Novak
22	MF	IRL	James Berrett
24	FW	ENG	Tom Denton
26	GK	ENG	Simon Eastwood (on loan at Bradford City)
27	DF	BRB	Krystian Pearce
28	MF	ENG	Lionel Ainsworth
29	DF	ENG	Liam Ridehalgh
30	MF	ENG	Lewis Nightingale
32	DF	ENG	Jack Hunt
33	DF	ENG	Leigh Franks
34	MF	ENG	Aidan Chippendale
35	DF	ENG	Neal Trotman (on loan from Preston North End)
36	FW	ENG	Nathan Eccleston (on loan from Liverpool)
43	MF	ENG	James Deltman (on loan)

== Players in and out ==
=== In ===
Date	Player	Previous club	Cost
29 May	(England) Antony Kay	Tranmere Rovers	Free
12 June	(England) Peter Clarke	Southend United	Free
18 June	(England) Robbie Simpson	Coventry City	£300,000
30 June	(England) Lee Peltier	Yeovil Town	Undisclosed Fee
3 July	(Jamaica) Theo Robinson	Watford	Undisclosed Fee
31 July	(Scotland) Jordan Rhodes	Ipswich Town	Undisclosed Fee
14 August	(England) Danny Drinkwater	Manchester United	Loan
10 November	(England) Tom Denton	Cheltenham Town	Loan Return
31 December	(England) Simon Eastwood	Bradford City	Loan Return
19 January	(Barbados) Krystian Pearce	Birmingham City	Undisclosed Fee
22 January	(England) Neal Trotman	Preston North End	Loan
28 January	(Australia) Dean Heffernan	Central Coast Mariners	Undisclosed Fee
28 January	(England) Nathan Eccleston	Liverpool	Loan
15 February	(England) Spencer Harris	Curzon Ashton	Loan Return
18 February	(England) Taser Hassan	Unattached	Free
23 February	(England) Jack Hunt	Grays Athletic	Loan Return
23 February	(England) Leigh Franks	Fleetwood Town	Loan Return
12 March	(England) Lewis Nightingale	Wakefield	Loan Return
20 April	(England) Ian Craney	Morecambe	Loan Return
29 April	(England) Lionel Ainsworth	Brentford	Loan Return
11 May	(Republic of Ireland) Jim Goodwin	Oldham Athletic	Loan Return
11 May	(England) Joe Skarz	Shrewsbury Town	Loan Return

=== Out ===
Date	Player	New Club	Cost
22 May	(England) Danny Cadamarteri	Dundee United	Free
26 May	(England) Jon Worthington	Oldham Athletic	Free
16 July	(England) Tom Denton	Cheltenham Town	Loan
22 July	(England) Ian Craney	Morecambe	Loan
22 July	(England) Phil Jevons	Morecambe	Loan
22 July	(England) Andy Holdsworth	Oldham Athletic	Free
22 July	(Scotland) Keigan Parker	Oldham Athletic	Free
25 July	(England) Simon Eastwood	Bradford City	Loan
4 August	(Wales) Michael Flynn	Bradford City	Free
25 September	(Sierra Leone) Malvin Kamara	Barrow	Free
14 December	(England) Spencer Harris	Curzon Ashton	Loan
1 January	(Republic of Ireland) Jim Goodwin	Oldham Athletic	Loan
7 January	(England) Andy Butler	Blackpool	Loan
13 January	(England) Matt Glennon	Bradford City	Free
21 January	(England) Joe Skarz	Shrewsbury Town	Loan
22 January	(England) Jack Hunt	Grays Athletic	Loan
22 January	(England) Leigh Franks	Fleetwood Town	Loan
27 January	(England) Lionel Ainsworth	Brentford	Loan
1 February	(England) Tom Denton	Wakefield	Loan
1 February	(England) Lewis Nightingale	Wakefield	Loan
12 March	(England) Lewis Nightingale	Salford City	Loan
17 March	(England) Spencer Harris	Ossett Town	Free
21 April	(England) Ian Craney	Fleetwood Town	Free
17 May	(England) Chris Lucketti	Released	Free
20 May	(England) Danny Drinkwater	Manchester United	Loan Return
20 May	(England) Nathan Eccleston	Liverpool	Loan Return
20 May	(England) Neal Trotman	Preston North End	Loan Return
21 May	(Australia) Dean Heffernan	Melbourne Heart	End of Contract

== Final league table ==
Pos	Team	Pld	W	D	L	GF	GA	GD	Pts	Promotion, qualification or relegation
4	Charlton Athletic	46	23	15	8	71	48	+23	84	Qualification for League One play-offs
5	Swindon Town	46	22	16	8	73	57	+16	82	Qualification for League One play-offs
6	Huddersfield Town	46	23	11	12	82	56	+26	80	Qualification for League One play-offs
7	Southampton	46	23	14	9	85	47	+38	73 (Note: Southampton were given a ten-point deduction for breaching insolvency regulations, regarding their holding company. As they finished in the bottom three last season, the points deduction were applied in the 2009–10 season.)	
8	Colchester United	46	20	12	14	64	52	+12	72	

Source: The Football League
Rules for classification: 1) points; 2) goal difference; 3) number of goals scored.

== Results ==
=== Pre-season matches ===
Date	Competition	Opponents	Home/ Away	Result F–A	Scorers	Attendance
11 July 2009	Pre-season Friendly	Gateshead	A	2–2	Simpson [22], Jevons [52]	756
11 July 2009	Pre-season Friendly	Wakefield	A	1–0	Denton [53]	684
15 July 2009	Pre-season Friendly	Corby Town	A	4–1	Robinson [10, 12, 68], Novak [54]	475
17 July 2009	Pre-season Friendly	A.F.C. Emley	A	6–0	Jevons [15, 25, 55], Flynn [18], Parker [49], Franks [69]	?
18 July 2009	Pre-season Friendly	Morecambe	A	3–0	Robinson [2, 44, 54]	1,018
21 July 2009	Pre-season Friendly	Newcastle United	H	0–1		9,691
22 July 2009	Pre-season Friendly	Bradford Park Avenue	A	4–0	Ainsworth [16, 35], Novak [50], Hunt [80]	?
25 July 2009	Pre-season Friendly	Coventry City	H	0–0		3,886
28 July 2009	Pre-season Friendly	Macclesfield Town	A	3–0	Pilkington [17], Collins [25], Simpson [84 pen]	?
1 August 2009	Pre-season Friendly	Wrexham	A	3–1	Robinson [2], Novak [83], Roberts [85]	1,303

=== Football League One ===
Date	Opponents	Home/ Away	Result F–A	Scorers	Attendance	Position
8 August 2009	Southend United	A	2–2	Pilkington [71], Rhodes [79]	8,059	9th
15 August 2009	Southampton	H	3–1	Rhodes [50, 68], Kay [82]	12,449	4th
18 August 2009	Brighton & Hove Albion	H	7–1	Kay [21], P. Clarke [35], Novak [43 (pen)], Roberts [64], Drinkwater [69], Robinson [73, 90]	11,269	4th
22 August 2009	Bristol Rovers	A	0–1		6,952	7th
29 August 2009	Yeovil Town	H	2–1	Robinson [33], Collins [65]	12,646	4th
5 September 2009	Milton Keynes Dons	A	3–2	Rhodes [55], Robinson [60], Kay [78]	9,772	3rd
12 September 2009	Brentford	H	0–0		12,020	4th
19 September 2009	Millwall	A	1–3	Rhodes [85]	8,502	6th
26 September 2009	Stockport County	H	0–0		14,921	6th
29 September 2009	Walsall	A	1–2	Robinson [47]	3,419	6th
3 October 2009	Colchester United	A	0–1		5,154	9th
10 October 2009	Exeter City	H	4–0	Novak [17], Rhodes [44, 49, 52]	13,438	8th
17 October 2009	Charlton Athletic	A	1–2	Pilkington [38]	16,991	8th
24 October 2009	Leyton Orient	H	4–0	Roberts [45], N. Clarke [57], Collins [74], Rhodes [90]	13,396	7th
1 November 2009	Oldham Athletic	A	1–0	Williams [59]	8,569	6th
14 November 2009	Wycombe Wanderers	H	6–0	P. Clarke [21, 63], Roberts [28], Pilkington [49], Duberry [82 (og)], Robinson [84 (pen)]	14,869	6th
21 November 2009	Hartlepool United	H	2–1	Hartley [56 (og)], Williams [66]	14,836	3rd
24 November 2009	Swindon Town	A	1–2	Novak [28]	6,630	5th
1 December 2009	Tranmere Rovers	H	3–3	Novak [6], Collins [58], Kay [81]	13,509	5th
5 December 2009	Leeds United	A	2–2	Novak [48], Rhodes [78]	36,723	5th
12 December 2009	Gillingham	H	2–1	Novak [40], Rhodes [45]	13,844	5th
19 December 2009	Norwich City	A	0–3		25,004	5th
28 December 2009	Milton Keynes Dons	H	1–0	Pilkington [27]	16,086	5th
16 January 2010	Southend United	H	2–1	Rhodes [44, 63]	14,200	5th
19 January 2010	Bristol Rovers	H	0–0		12,624	6th
30 January 2010	Yeovil Town	A	1–0	Eccleston [23]	4,110	7th
6 February 2010	Carlisle United	H	1–1	Pilkington [50]	14,132	7th
9 February 2010	Brighton & Hove Albion	A	0–0		4,711	7th
13 February 2010	Swindon Town	H	2–2	P. Clarke [8], Kay [50]	14,610	7th
16 February 2010	Carlisle United	A	2–1	Novak [6], Rhodes [56]	5,236	7th
20 February 2010	Hartlepool United	A	2–0	Roberts [15 (pen)], Trotman [66]	4,452	6th
23 February 2010	Tranmere Rovers	A	2–0	Novak [8, 48]	5,793	6th
27 February 2010	Leeds United	H	2–2	Pilkington [13], Roberts [85]	21,764	6th
2 March 2010	Southampton	A	0–5		19,821	6th
6 March 2010	Gillingham	A	0–2		5,388	7th
13 March 2010	Norwich City	H	1–3	Trotman [3]	17,959	7th
20 March 2010	Leyton Orient	A	2–0	Rhodes [26], Robinson [68]	4,119	7th
27 March 2010	Charlton Athletic	H	1–1	Rhodes [53]	14,459	7th
3 April 2010	Wycombe Wanderers	A	2–1	Rhodes [22], Robinson [52]	5,288	6th
6 April 2010	Oldham Athletic	H	2–0	Robinson [38, 90]	14,561	6th
10 April 2010	Brentford	A	0–3		5,209	6th
13 April 2010	Walsall	H	4–3	Robinson [22 (pen)], Rhodes [45], Kay [90], Novak [90]	14,396	6th
16 April 2010	Millwall	H	1–0	P. Clarke [39]	16,050	6th
24 April 2010	Stockport County	A	6–0	Pilkington [2], Robinson [37], Rhodes [68], Drinkwater [85], Roberts [90], Novak [90 (pen)]	6,887	6th
1 May 2010	Colchester United	H	2–1	Robinson [17 (pen)], Novak [90]	19,750	6th
8 May 2010	Exeter City	A	1–2	Roberts [2]	8,383	6th

=== Football League play-offs ===
Date	Round	Opponents	Home/ Away	Result F–A	Scorers	Attendance
15 May 2010	Semi-Final 1st Leg	Millwall	H	0–0		14,654
18 May 2010	Semi-Final 2nd Leg	Millwall	A	0–2		15,463: Millwall won 2–0 on aggregate.

=== FA Cup ===
Date	Round	Opponents	Home/ Away	Result F–A	Scorers	Attendance
6 November 2009	Round 1	Dagenham & Redbridge	H	6–1	Williams [9], Roberts [21, 72], Novak [24, 56], Rhodes [44]	5,858
28 November 2009	Round 2	Port Vale	A	1–0	N. Clarke [12]	5,311
2 January 2010	Round 3	West Bromwich Albion	H	0–2		13,472

=== Football League Cup ===
Date	Round	Opponents	Home/ Away	Result F–A	Scorers	Attendance
11 August 2009	Round 1	Stockport County	H	3–1	Rhodes [45, 48], Robinson [74]	5,120
26 August 2009	Round 2	Newcastle United	A	3–4	Robinson [37, 39 (pen)], Rhodes [47]	23,815

=== Football League Trophy ===
Date	Round	Opponents	Home/ Away	Result F–A	Scorers	Attendance
1 September 2009	Round 1 North East	Rotherham United	A	2–1	P. Clarke [2], Simpson [7]	2,246
6 October 2009	Round 2 North East	Chesterfield	A	3–3	Pilkington [65, 90], N. Clarke [90]	3,003: Chesterfield won 4 – 2 on penalties

	Penalties
Lowry (penalty scored); Lester (penalty scored); Gray (penalty scored); McDermott (penalty scored)	4 – 2	(penalty missed) Pilkington: over crossbar (penalty scored) Williams; (penalty missed) Goodwin: Lee saved (penalty scored) Kay

== Appearances & goals ==
Squad No.	Name	Nationality	Position	League		FA Cup		League Cup		Football League Trophy		Play-offs		Total	
Squad No.	Name	Nationality	Position	Apps	Goals	Apps	Goals	Apps	Goals	Apps	Goals	Apps	Goals	Apps	Goals
1	Alex Smithies	England	GK	46	0	3	0	2	0	2	0	2	0	55	0
2	Lee Peltier	England	DF	42	0	3	0	2	0	1	0	2	0	50	0
3	Joe Skarz	England	DF	14 (1)	0	1	0	2	0	2	0	0	0	19 (1)	0
4	Michael Collins	Republic of Ireland	MF	23 (5)	3	3	0	1	0	2	0	0 (1)	0	29 (6)	3
5	Peter Clarke	England	DF	46	5	3	0	2	0	1	1	2	0	54	6
6	Nathan Clarke	England	DF	15 (1)	1	3	1	1	0	2	1	0 (1)	0	21 (2)	3
7	Gary Roberts	England	MF	40 (3)	7	3	2	1	0	1	0	2	0	47 (3)	9
8	Antony Kay	England	MF	38 (2)	6	3	0	2	0	1	0	2	0	46 (2)	6
9	Theo Robinson	England	FW	17 (20)	13	0 (3)	0	1 (1)	3	0	0	0 (1)	0	18 (25)	16
10	Robbie Simpson	England	FW	4 (10)	0	0	0	0 (2)	0	1	1	0	0	5 (12)	1
11	Jim Goodwin	Republic of Ireland	MF	3 (2)	0	0	0	0	0	2	0	0	0	5 (2)	0
12	Tom Clarke	England	DF	15 (7)	0	0 (2)	0	1	0	0	0	1	0	17 (9)	0
13	Dean Heffernan	Australia	DF	15	0	0	0	0	0	0	0	0	0	15	0
16	Robbie Williams	England	DF	13 (4)	2	2	1	0	0	0 (1)	0	1 (1)	0	16 (6)	3
17	Jordan Rhodes	Scotland	FW	43 (2)	19	3	1	2	3	1	0	2	0	51 (2)	23
18	Andy Butler	England	DF	10 (1)	0	0	0	1	0	1	0	0	0	12 (1)	0
19	Anthony Pilkington	Republic of Ireland	MF	42 (1)	7	2	0	2	0	2	2	2	0	50 (1)	9
21	Lee Novak	England	FW	24 (14)	12	3	2	1	0	1 (1)	0	2	0	31 (15)	14
22	James Berrett	Republic of Ireland	MF	2 (7)	0	0 (1)	0	0 (1)	0	1	0	0	0	3 (9)	0
25	Danny Drinkwater	England	MF	27 (6)	2	0 (1)	0	1	0	0	0	2	0	30 (7)	2
27	Krystian Pearce	Barbados	DF	0 (1)	0	0	0	0	0	0	0	0	0	0 (1)	0
28	Lionel Ainsworth	England	MF	2 (9)	0	1 (1)	0	0 (2)	0	1 (1)	0	0	0	4 (13)	0
35	Neal Trotman	England	DF	21	2	0	0	0	0	0	0	2	0	23	2
36	Nathan Eccleston	England	FW	4 (7)	1	0	0	0	0	0	0	0 (1)	0	4 (8)	1
