= List of FC Halifax Town seasons =

FC Halifax Town is a professional association football club based in Halifax, West Yorkshire, England. They currently compete in the National League, the fifth tier of English football, and play at the Shay. They replaced Halifax Town A.F.C., which went into administration in the 2007–08 season.

== Seasons ==
Year	League														Cup competitions										Manager
Year	Division	Lvl	Pld	W	D	L	GF	GA	GD	Pts	Position	Leading league scorer		Average attendance	FA Cup		FA Trophy		Other competitions						Manager
Year	Division	Lvl	Pld	W	D	L	GF	GA	GD	Pts	Position	Name	Goals	Average attendance	Res	Rec	Res	Rec	Competition	Res	Rec	Competition	Res	Rec	Manager
Club formed after Halifax Town was dissolved in May 2008.
2008–09	NPL Division One North	8	40	17	12	11	71	52	+19	63	8th of 21	Ashley Stott	15	1,165	QR2	2–1–1	PR	0–0–1	–			–			Jim Vince
2009–10	NPL Division One North	8	42	30	10	2	108	38	+70	100	1st of 22; Promoted	James Dean	27	1,452	QR4	4–0–1	QR3	3–0–1	–			–			Neil Aspin
2010–11	NPL Premier Division	7	42	30	8	4	108	36	+72	98	1st of 22; Promoted	Jamie Vardy	22	1,627	QR4	3–0–1	QR2	1–0–1	–			–			Neil Aspin
2011–12	Conference North	6	42	21	11	10	80	59	+21	74	3rd of 22	Lee Gregory	18	1,419	R1	3–0–1	QR3	0–1–1	–			–			Neil Aspin
2011–12	Conference North	6	Lost in the play-off semifinal.											1,419	R1	3–0–1	QR3	0–1–1	–			–			Neil Aspin
2012–13	Conference North	6	42	21	12	9	86	38	+48	75	5th of 22	Lee Gregory	20	1,222	QR4	2–2–1	QF	4–1–1	–			–			Neil Aspin
2012–13	Conference North	6	Promoted after winning the play-offs.											1,222	QR4	2–2–1	QF	4–1–1	–			–			Neil Aspin
2013–14	Conference Premier	5	46	22	11	13	85	58	+27	77	5th of 24	Lee Gregory	29	1,597	R1	1–0–1	R1	0–0–1	–			–			Neil Aspin
2013–14	Conference Premier	5	Lost in the play-off semifinal.											1,597	R1	1–0–1	R1	0–0–1	–			–			Neil Aspin
2014–15	Conference Premier	5	46	17	15	14	60	54	+6	66	9th of 24	Lois Maynard	11	1,472	R1	1–1–1	QF	3–1–1	–			–			Neil Aspin
Fifth and sixth tier divisions renamed.
2015–16	National; League	5	46	12	12	22	55	82	−27	48	21st of 24; Relegated	Jordan Burrow	14	1,546	R1	1–1–1	W	5–2–0	–			–			Neil Aspin; Darren Kelly; Jim Harvey
2016–17	National League; North	6	42	24	8	10	81	43	+38	80	3rd of 22	Tom Denton	16	1,810	R2	4–2–1	QR3	0–1–1	–			–			Billy Heath
2016–17	National League; North	6	Promoted after winning the play-offs.											1,810	R2	4–2–1	QR3	0–1–1	–			–			Billy Heath
2017–18	National; League	5	46	13	16	17	48	58	−10	55	16th of 24	Tom Denton; Matty Kosylo	10	1,726	QR4	0–0–1	R2	1–0–1	West Riding Cup	R2	1–0–1	–			Billy Heath; Jamie Fullarton
2018–19	National; League	5	46	13	20	13	44	43	+1	59	15th of 24	Devante Rodney	7	1,553	R2	2–2–1	R2	1–1–1	West Riding Cup	R3	1–1–1	–			Jamie Fullarton
2019–20	National; League	5	37	17	7	13	50	49	+1	58	6th of 24	Liam McAlinden	10	2,141	QR4	0–0–1	R3	2–0–1	–			–			Pete Wild
2019–20	National; League	5	The regular season was cut short due to COVID-19, final league positions decided by points-per-game Lost in the play-off quarter-final.											2,141	QR4	0–0–1	R3	2–0–1	–			–			Pete Wild
2020–21	National; League	5	42	19	8	15	63	54	+9	65	10th of 22	Jake Hyde	12	– (Note: Most of the games were played behind the closed doors.)	QR4	0–0–1	R4	0–1–1	–			–			Pete Wild
2021–22	National; League	5	44	25	9	10	62	35	+27	84	4th of 23	Billy Waters	17	2,130	R2	2–1–1	R5	0–1–1	West Riding Cup	R2	1–0–1	–			Pete Wild
2021–22	National; League	5	Lost in the play-off quarter-final.											2,130	R2	2–1–1	R5	0–1–1	West Riding Cup	R2	1–0–1	–			Pete Wild
2022–23	National; League	5	46	16	13	17	49	48	+1	61	10th of 24	Emmanuel Dieseruvwe	13	2,192	R1	1–0–1	W	2–3–0	West Riding Cup	R1	0–1–0	–			Chris Millington
2023-24	National; League	5	46	19	14	13	58	50	+8	71	7th of 24	Robert Harker	9	1,946	QR4	0–0–1	R3	0–1–0	West Riding Cup	R2	0–0–1	–			Chris Millington
2023-24	National; League	5	Lost in the play-off quarter-final.											1,946	QR4	0–0–1	R3	0–1–0	West Riding Cup	R2	0–0–1	–			Chris Millington
2024-25	National; League	5	46	19	13	14	50	46	+4	70	6th of 24	Jamie Cooke	7	1,744	QR4	0–0–1	R3	0–1–0	West Riding Cup	R1	0–0–1	National League Cup	Group C 7th of 8	1–1–2	Chris Millington
2024-25	National; League	5	Lost in the play-off quarter-final.											1,744	QR4	0–0–1	R3	0–1–0	West Riding Cup	R1	0–0–1	National League Cup	Group C 7th of 8	1–1–2	Chris Millington
2025-26	National; League	5	46	20	10	16	69	66	+3	70	8th of 24	Will Harris	22	1,580	R1	1–0–1	R5	2–1–0	West Riding Cup	R2	0–0–1	National League Cup	QF	2–2–1	Adam Lakeland
