= Tom Clarke (footballer, born 1987) =

English association football player

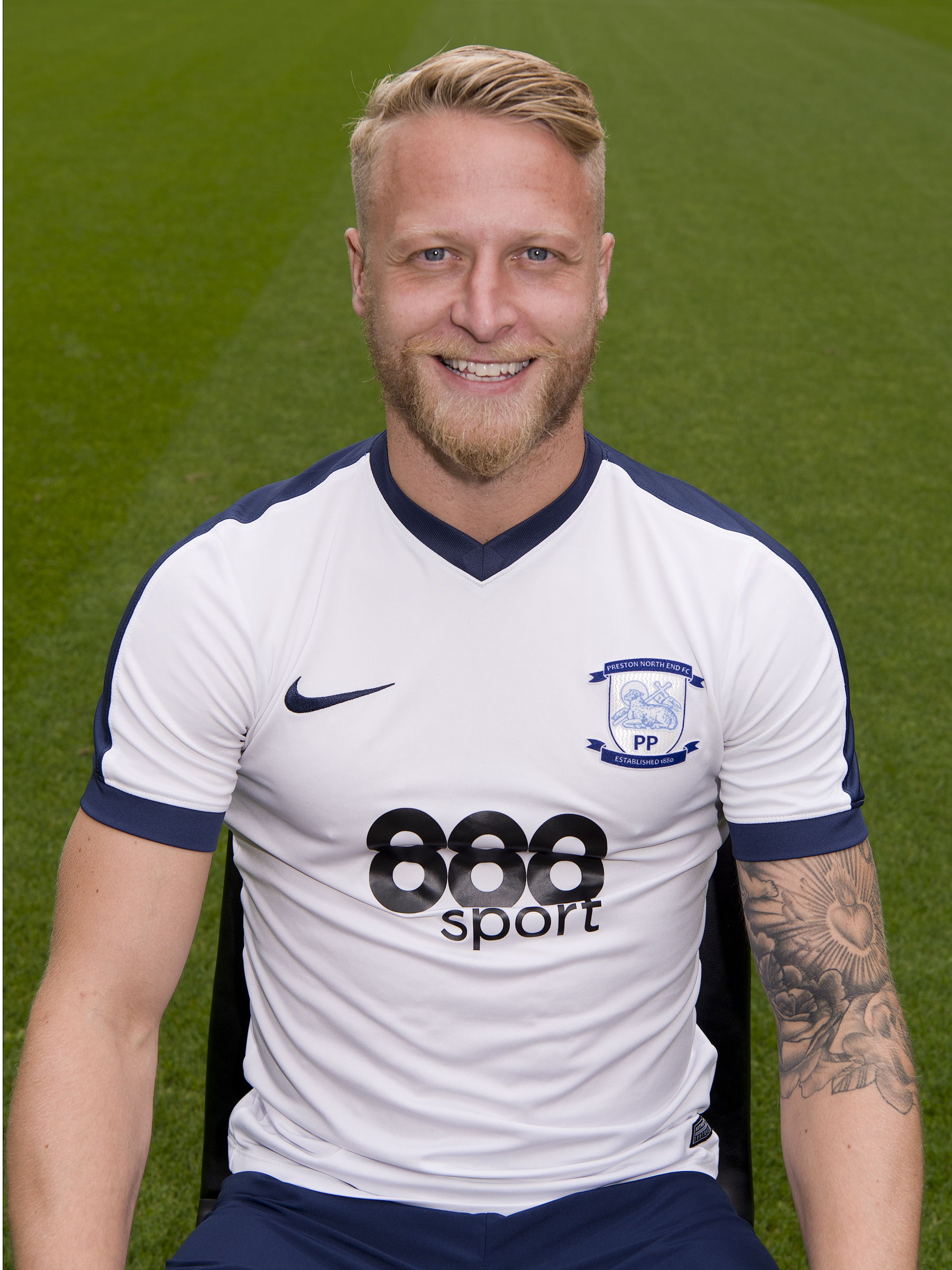
- Clarke in 2016

Personal information
- Full name: Thomas Clarke
- Date of birth: 21 December 1987 (age 38)
- Place of birth: Halifax, England
- Height: 5 ft 11 in (1.80 m)
- Positions: Defender; midfielder

Youth career
- –2005: Huddersfield Town

Senior career*
Years	Team	Apps	(Gls)
2005–2013	Huddersfield Town	97	(3)
2008	→ Halifax Town (loan)	7	(1)
2008	→ Bradford City (loan)	6	(0)
2011	→ Leyton Orient (loan)	10	(0)
2013–2020	Preston North End	211	(12)
2020–2021	Salford City	30	(2)
2021–2022	Fleetwood Town	35	(2)
2022–2023	Halifax Town	8	(0)
Total		396	(20)

International career
2005	England U18	1	(0)
2005–2006	England U19	2	(1)
- * Club domestic league appearances and goals

Thomas Clarke (born 21 December 1987) is an English former professional footballer who played as a defender or midfielder. He played for Huddersfield Town, Preston North End and Salford City. Clarke is a former England youth international, having represented England at both under-18 and under-19 level.

== Club career ==
=== Huddersfield Town ===
==== Breakthrough to first team ====
Born in Halifax, West Yorkshire, Clarke is a product of the Huddersfield academy. Clarke's older brother, Nathan Clarke, is also a professional footballer previously with Huddersfield. Tom signed his first professional contract in January 2005. His debut came against the MK Dons. Clarke scored his first goal for The Terriers in a 2–0 win over Blackpool at the Galpharm Stadium in January 2006.

Clarke made his first start of the 2006–07 season coming on as a 61st-minute substitute replacing Danny Adams, in a 2–0 loss away at Crewe Alexandra on 2 September. He made his first start of the season on 9 September in a 2–0 loss away at Cheltenham Town. He ruptured a ligament in his left knee during Huddersfield Town's League One home match against Carlisle United, on 14 October 2006 forcing him to sit out most of the 2006–07 season.

Clarke joined Conference Premier club Halifax Town on loan on 21 February 2008, in a bid to regain match practice. He made his debut for the Shaymen in their 0–0 draw at The Shay against Stafford Rangers on 23 February. His first goal for the club came in their 3–1 win over Histon at Bridge Road on 8 March.

He returned to Huddersfield on 23 March and made his first appearance since returning in Huddersfield's 1–0 win over Tranmere Rovers on 19 April.

==== 2008–09 season ====
He signed on a month-long loan with League Two club Bradford City in October 2008. He made his debut the following day against Grimsby Town, when he came on as a first-half substitute for Omar Daley, following defender Matthew Clarke's sending off. City were leading 1–0 at the time and won the game 3–1. He made his full debut in a 1–0 victory over Bury on 29 October. With a number of injuries, Bradford extended his loan spell for a second month, with Huddersfield caretaker manager Gerry Murphy able to recall him at 24 hours' notice. Murphy recalled Clarke on 3 December following a training ground injury to left-back Joe Skarz. Clarke's last game for City was their FA Cup exit to Leyton Orient four days previously; he also played six league games for City. Following the injury sustained by regular right-back Andy Holdsworth, Clarke found himself back in the first-team frame under Lee Clark and scored his first away goal for Huddersfield in a 2–1 win at Glanford Park against Scunthorpe United on 10 April 2009.

==== 2009–10 season ====
After fighting his way back from injury, Tom picked up where he left off in the 2009–10 season enjoying his best run in the team in central midfield under Lee Clark during the 2009–10 campaign. Bad luck struck again when he suffered a repeat injury to his knee against Millwall in the first leg of the end of season Play-Offs, as Huddersfield went on to lose the second leg away at Millwall and as a result missing out on the chance of promotion.

==== 2011–12 season & promotion ====
On 9 September 2011, Clarke signed for fellow League One club Leyton Orient on a 93-day emergency loan. He made 12 appearances, before his loan expired on 12 December.

Clarke returned from his loan spell at Leyton Orient in December 2011, his first game of the season for Huddersfield came in the club's 1–0 boxing day win over Chesterfield on 26 December 2011 when he came on for left back Gary Naysmith. His first start of the season came in the club's 2–2 draw away at Notts County on 2 January 2012. Clarke became the club's starting left back during the third quarter of the season due to injured Gary Naysmith March and April 2012 until he was himself pushed out of the team by Calum Woods. Clarke was though used during the latter stages of the season in his more familiar role in the midfield mostly being used as a substitute. He played in both legs of Huddersfield's play-off semi final against MK Dons coming on as a 51st-minute substitute for left back Callum Woods in the first leg way at Stadium MK which Huddersfield won 2–0, and was an 88th-minute sub for winger Kallum Higginbotham in the second leg at home as Huddersfield progressed to the final. Clark made 16 appearances for Huddersfield during the 2011–12 season, as Huddersfield finished the season as Play-off champions winning promotion to the Championship after beating Sheffield United on penalties in the Wembley final.

==== 2012–13 season ====
Clarke signed a new one-year contract, committing himself to the Huddersfield Town until the summer of 2013 on 28 June 2012 making him the longest serving current player at the club.

On 6 May 2013, it was confirmed that Clarke was to be released from the club when his existing contract ended in the summer, bringing an end to his eight-year stay with his home town club.

=== Preston North End ===
It was announced on 22 May 2013 that Clarke had signed for Preston North End on a two-year contract.

On 5 August 2013 in only his second appearance for Preston, Clarke scored a magnificent late winner in the 87th minute to defeat Blackpool in a derby game at Deepdale.

=== Salford City ===
Clarke signed for League Two club Salford City on 14 July 2020 on a two-year deal. On 15 May 2021, Salford announced he would be released despite having a year left on his contract.

=== Fleetwood Town ===
On 14 June 2021, Clarke joined Fleetwood Town on a one-year deal. A one-year contract extension was triggered at the end of the 2021–22 season.

=== FC Halifax Town ===
On 30 July 2022, it was announced that Clarke had signed for his hometown club, FC Halifax Town.

On 4 September 2023, Clarke announced his retirement from football following a persistent knee injury.

== International career ==
An England international, Clarke has represented England at international youth level, being capped at both under 18s and under 19s level. He earned two caps for the under 19s scoring once between 2006 and 2005.

== Personal life ==
Clarke's older brother, Nathan Clarke, was also a professional footballer.

== Career statistics ==
As of end of 2021–22 season

Appearances and goals by club, season and competition
Club	Season	League			FA Cup		League Cup		Other		Total	
Club	Season	Division	Apps	Goals	Apps	Goals	Apps	Goals	Apps	Goals	Apps	Goals
Huddersfield Town	2004–05	League One	12	0	0	0	0	0	0	0	12	0
Huddersfield Town	2005–06	League One	17	1	1	0	1	0	1 (Note: Appearance in Football League Trophy)	0	20	1
Huddersfield Town	2006–07	League One	9	0	0	0	0	0	0	0	9	0
Huddersfield Town	2007–08	League One	3	0	0	0	0	0	1	0	4	0
Huddersfield Town	2008–09	League One	15	1	0	0	0	0	1	0	16	1
Huddersfield Town	2009–10	League One	22	0	2	0	1	0	1 (Note: Appearance(s) in League One play-offs)	0	26	0
Huddersfield Town	2010–11	League One	5	1	2	0	0	0	1	0	8	1
Huddersfield Town	2011–12	League One	14	0	0	0	0	0	2	0	16	0
Huddersfield Town	2012–13	Championship	0	0	0	0	1	0	—		1	0
Huddersfield Town	Huddersfield Town total		97	3	5	0	3	0	7	0	112	3
Halifax Town (loan)	2007–08	Conference Premier	7	1	0	0	—		0	0	7	1
Bradford City (loan)	2008–09	League Two	6	0	1	0	0	0	0	0	7	0
Leyton Orient (loan)	2011–12	League One	10	0	1	0	1	0	0	0	12	0
Preston North End	2013–14	League One	42	4	5	1	2	1	3 (Note: One appearance in Football League Trophy, two League One play-offs)	0	52	6
Preston North End	2014–15	League One	43	1	5	0	2	0	8 (Note: Five appearances and one goal in Football League Trophy, three appearances in League One play-offs)	1	58	2
Preston North End	2015–16	Championship	35	0	1	0	2	0	—		38	0
Preston North End	2016–17	Championship	42	4	1	0	3	0	—		46	4
Preston North End	2017–18	Championship	18	2	2	0	0	0	—		20	2
Preston North End	2018–19	Championship	21	1	0	0	1	0	—		22	1
Preston North End	2019–20	Championship	10	0	0	0	1	0	—		11	0
Preston North End	Preston North End total		211	12	14	1	11	1	11	1	247	15
Salford City	2020–21	League Two	30	2	1	0	1	0	1	0	35	2
Fleetwood Town	2021–22	League One	35	2	1	0	0	0	0	0	36	2
Career total			396	20	23	1	16	1	19	1	456	23

== Honours ==
Huddersfield Town

- Football League One play-offs: 2012

Preston North End

- Football League One play-offs: 2015

Salford City

- EFL Trophy: 2019–20

FC Halifax Town

- FA Trophy: 2022–23

Individual

- PFA Team of the Year: 2014–15 League One
- Preston North End Players' Player of the Year: 2016–17
