= Simon Eastwood =

English footballer (born 1989)

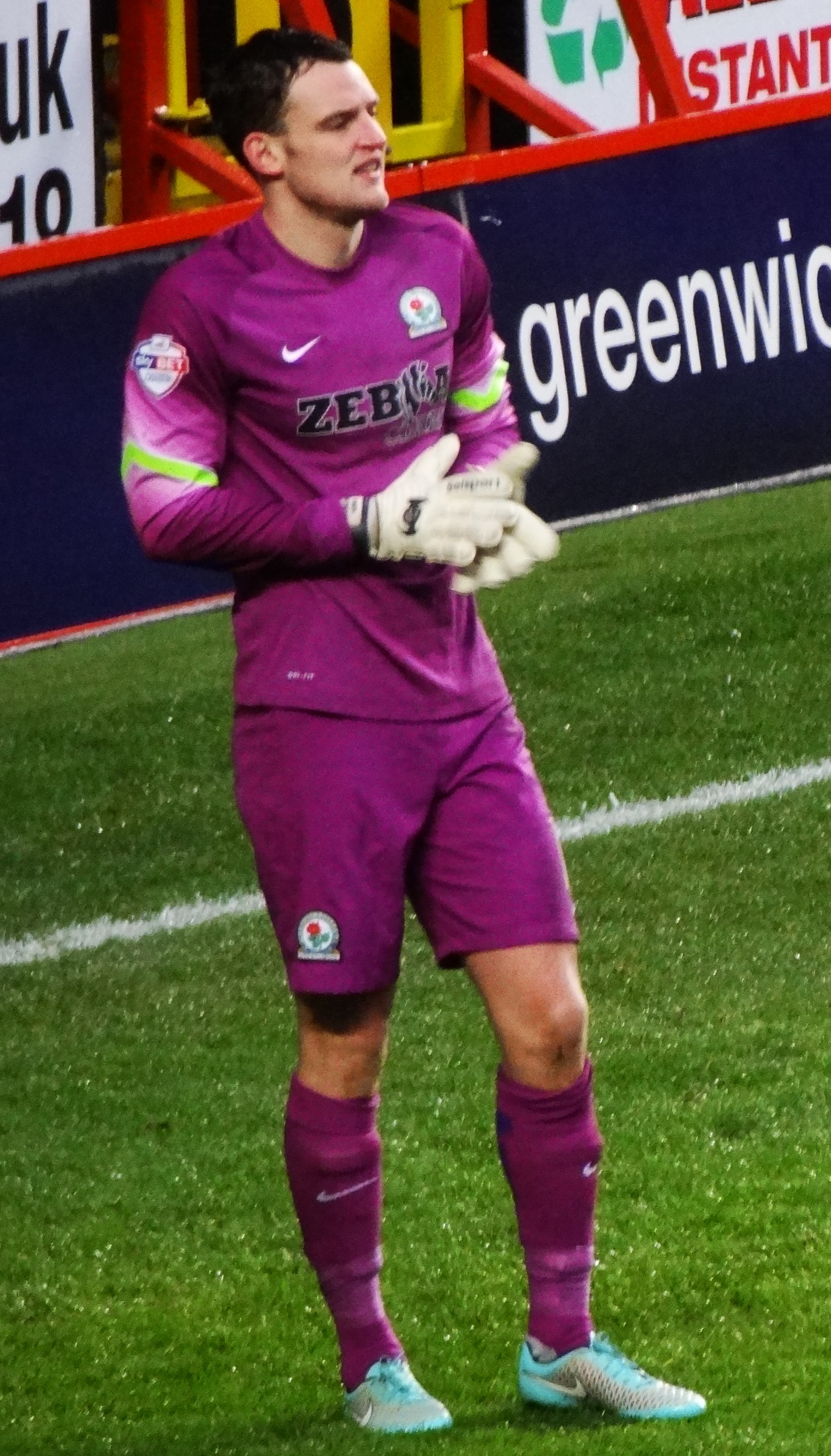
- Eastwood playing for Blackburn Rovers in 2015

Personal information
- Full name: Simon Christopher Eastwood
- Date of birth: 26 June 1989 (age 37)
- Place of birth: Luton, England
- Height: 6 ft 2 in (1.88 m)
- Position: Goalkeeper

Team information
- Current team: Oxford United
- Number: 13

Youth career
- –2007: Huddersfield Town

Senior career*
Years	Team	Apps	(Gls)
2007–2010	Huddersfield Town	1	(0)
2008–2009	→ Woking (loan)	12	(0)
2009	→ Bradford City (loan)	22	(0)
2010–2011	Oxford United	0	(0)
2011–2012	FC Halifax Town	39	(0)
2012–2013	Portsmouth	27	(0)
2013–2016	Blackburn Rovers	13	(0)
2016–	Oxford United	234	(0)

International career
2007	England U18	1	(0)
2007	England U19	1	(0)
- * Club domestic league appearances and goals as of 07:00, 5 November 2026 (UTC)

Simon Christopher Eastwood (born 26 June 1989) is an English professional footballer who plays as a goalkeeper for EFL League One club Oxford United.

Eastwood started his career as a youth player with Huddersfield Town. He went professional in 2007, but struggled to break into the first team and went on loan to Woking in 2008 then moved to Bradford City a year later. He made a permanent transfer to Oxford United in 2010 but did not make a first-team appearance, and in the following years he played for FC Halifax Town, Portsmouth, and Blackburn Rovers, before returning to Oxford in 2016.

Eastwood has played internationally for England twice at under-18 and under-19 levels.

== Club career ==
=== Huddersfield Town ===
Born in Luton, Bedfordshire, Eastwood was a Huddersfield Town academy goalkeeper who made two appearances on the substitutes' bench in the 2005–06 season at the age of just 16. At the start of the 2006–07 season, he was the third-choice goalkeeper behind Paul Rachubka and new signing Matt Glennon. After Rachubka's departure to Blackpool, Eastwood became second-choice goalkeeper behind Glennon.

Eastwood signed his first professional contract in the summer of 2007. On 16 January 2008, he and fellow Huddersfield youngster Shane Killock signed new one-year contract extensions. This was after he fell behind goalkeeper Alex Smithies in the pecking order. On 27 November 2008, he joined Conference Premier club Woking. His first appearance for Woking was in their 1–1 draw with Rushden & Diamonds on 9 December 2008. Following Huddersfield's 3–1 defeat by Crewe Alexandra on 21 February 2009, he was recalled by manager Lee Clark following an injury to Matt Glennon. Clark gave Eastwood his full debut on the last day of the 2008–09 season, as regular keeper Alex Smithies had a shoulder injury. The match was Huddersfield's 1–1 draw against Leyton Orient at Brisbane Road on 2 May 2009.

Eastwood was contracted to the club until the summer of 2011. He was officially made available for transfer along with seven other players by Town manager Lee Clark on 24 May 2010. On 4 June 2010 he left Huddersfield, having made only one first-team appearance for the club, to join Oxford United for the 2010–11 season.

==== Bradford City (loan) ====
On 25 July, he joined League Two club Bradford City on loan until the end of the year. He made his debut in the 5–0 defeat by Notts County at Meadow Lane on 8 August 2009. After 28 appearances (22 in the league) he returned to the Galpharm on 31 December, after Bradford manager Stuart McCall said he needed a more experienced goalkeeper at the club.

=== Oxford United ===
On 4 June 2010, Eastwood signed a two-year contract with Oxford United, newly promoted to League Two. However, Eastwood was second-choice goalkeeper behind ever-present Ryan Clarke, who made 50 appearances in the 2010–11 season. After one season at Oxford, having failed to make a first-team appearance, Eastwood was released in May 2011 despite having a year left on his contract.

=== FC Halifax Town ===
On 21 June, Eastwood signed a one-year contract with Conference North club FC Halifax Town. On 13 August he made his debut, against Corby Town. He won the competition for first-team place against Phil Senior, making 43 appearances (41 in the league), only missing three league matches. However, at the end of the season he opted to sign a contract with local side Bradford Park Avenue instead of signing again for Halifax.

=== Portsmouth ===
On 8 July 2012, Eastwood agreed a contract with Conference North club Bradford Park Avenue. However, just five days later, after Eastwood chose to take a trial with Portsmouth, his contract with Bradford was rescinded, the club stating that it would not stand in his way. After featuring in all Portsmouth's preseason matches, Eastwood joined Pompey on 13 August 2012, on non-contract terms, one day ahead of their League Cup tie against Plymouth Argyle, in which he made his debut. On the eve of the new league season, Portsmouth signed their entire new squad, including signing Mikkel Andersen from Reading on loan. Andersen secured first place in the team, meaning Eastwood was on the bench. Eastwood played his second match on 9 October, in a Football League Trophy second round match against Wycombe Wanderers; the club failed to progress after losing 3–1. However, Eastwood managed to save a penalty although the rebound was scored by Wycombe's Dean Morgan.

Due to limited playing time, Eastwood was the main goalkeeper for Portsmouth's development squad. He made his third first-team appearance in a first round FA Cup match against Notts County, on 3 November. On the following Tuesday, he made his league debut at Fratton Park against Brentford; Pompey lost the League One fixture 1–0. On 20 November 2012, first-choice goalkeeper Andersen made his last appearance for Portsmouth in a 2–3 defeat to Leyton Orient before returning to Premier League club Reading, making Eastwood the only goalkeeper at Portsmouth, and securing his first-team place. Just after Andersen's departure, former Swindon Town goalkeeper Phil Smith was signed, initially as back-up for Eastwood. Eastwood's position was under threat, when former Portsmouth goalkeeper Alan Knight (famous for the most appearances for a Portsmouth player) came in as goalkeeper coach (after the departure of John Keeley). Knight backed Eastwood, and on 2 March 2013 Pompey won their first match in over four months (23 matches), a 2–1 win at Crewe Alexandra, Eastwood's first win as a Portsmouth player. In the next month he kept three clean sheets in six matches, against Bury, Preston North End and Tranmere Rovers. Following Portsmouth's relegation, Eastwood said he was determined to stay at the club for the next season. He was offered a new contract with the club.

=== Blackburn Rovers ===
Eastwood rejected Portsmouth's offer and on 13 May 2013 agreed a deal in principle to join Championship club Blackburn Rovers. He made his debut for the club on 7 August 2013 in a first round League Cup tie against Carlisle United, which Blackburn lost on penalties after a 3–3 draw. In December he displaced Jake Kean as first-choice goalkeeper, making his Championship debut for the club on 7 December 2013 in an away match against Queens Park Rangers, putting in an impressive performance and keeping a clean sheet in a 0–0 draw. After seven matches as first choice, Eastwood returned to being back-up as Paul Robinson returned from injury and reclaimed his number one spot. On 28 February 2014, Eastwood signed a new contract until the summer of 2016.

=== Oxford United ===
In June 2016, Eastwood signed for Oxford United for the second time, on a one-year contract. He was given the number 1 jersey and played every minute of all 62 first-team matches in 2016–17, including the 2017 EFL Trophy Final at Wembley Stadium. He signed a two-year contract extension in February 2017, and was voted the Supporters' and Players' Player of the Year at the club's end-of-season awards. The following season he was again ever-present in league fixtures, though he was rested for a couple of EFL Trophy games. Eastwood signed a new three-year contract with Oxford in May 2018.

Eastwood suffered a broken finger during the warm-up of the second League One fixture of the 2018–19 season on 11 August 2018, and second-choice goalkeeper Scott Shearer made his first league appearance since arriving at the club two seasons earlier, ending Eastwood's run of 93 consecutive league appearances. Jonathan Mitchell was subsequently loaned from Derby County as emergency cover. Eastwood shared goalkeeping duties with Jack Stevens during the 2020–21 and 2021–22 seasons but regained his place as first choice after Stevens was loaned out to Port Vale at the start of 2022–23. The signing of James Beadle on loan at the start of the following season saw Eastwood once more serving as back-up goalkeeper, though he signed a new two-year contract in August 2023.

== International career ==
On 27 March 2007, he received his first call-up to the England under-18 team, where he played in their 4–1 win against the Netherlands at Huish Park. On 30 August 2007, he received his first call-up for the England under-19 team in a match against Belarus at Meadow Lane. He played the whole 90 minutes of the match on 11 September, and kept a clean sheet as England won 4–0.

== Career statistics ==
As of match played 3 February 2024

Appearances and goals by club, season and competition
Club	Season	League			FA Cup		League Cup		Other		Total	
Club	Season	Division	Apps	Goals	Apps	Goals	Apps	Goals	Apps	Goals	Apps	Goals
Huddersfield Town	2007–08	League One	0	0	0	0	0	0	0	0	0	0
Huddersfield Town	2008–09	League One	1	0	0	0	0	0	0	0	1	0
Huddersfield Town	2009–10	League One	0	0	—		—		—		0	0
Huddersfield Town	Total		1	0	0	0	0	0	0	0	1	0
Woking (loan)	2008–09	Conference Premier	12	0	—		—		2 (Note: One appearance in FA Trophy, one in Conference League Cup)	0	14	0
Bradford City (loan)	2009–10	League Two	22	0	1	0	1	0	4 (Note: Appearance(s) in Football League Trophy)	0	28	0
Oxford United	2010–11	League Two	0	0	0	0	0	0	0	0	0	0
FC Halifax Town	2011–12	Conference North	39	0	3	0	—		4 (Note: Two appearances in FA Trophy, two in Conference North play-offs)	0	46	0
Portsmouth	2012–13	League One	27	0	1	0	1	0	1	0	30	0
Blackburn Rovers	2013–14	Championship	7	0	1	0	1	0	—		9	0
Blackburn Rovers	2014–15	Championship	6	0	5	0	0	0	—		11	0
Blackburn Rovers	2015–16	Championship	0	0	0	0	0	0	—		0	0
Blackburn Rovers	Total		13	0	6	0	1	0	—		20	0
Oxford United	2016–17	League One	46	0	6	0	2	0	8 (Note: Appearances in EFL Trophy)	0	62	0
Oxford United	2017–18	League One	46	0	1	0	1	0	4	0	52	0
Oxford United	2018–19	League One	34	0	4	0	0	0	4	0	42	0
Oxford United	2019–20	League One	29	0	4	0	4	0	4 (Note: One appearance in EFL Trophy, three in League One play-offs)	0	41	0
Oxford United	2020–21	League One	13	0	0	0	1	0	4	0	18	0
Oxford United	2021–22	League One	14	0	2	0	2	0	3	0	21	0
Oxford United	2022–23	League One	43	0	0	0	0	0	1	0	44	0
Oxford United	2023–24	League One	2	0	2	0	0	0	4	0	8	0
Oxford United	Total		227	0	19	0	10	0	32	0	288	0
Career total			341	0	30	0	13	0	43	0	427	0

== Honours ==
Oxford United

- EFL League One play-offs: 2024
- EFL Trophy runner-up: 2016–17
