= James Berrett =

English footballer

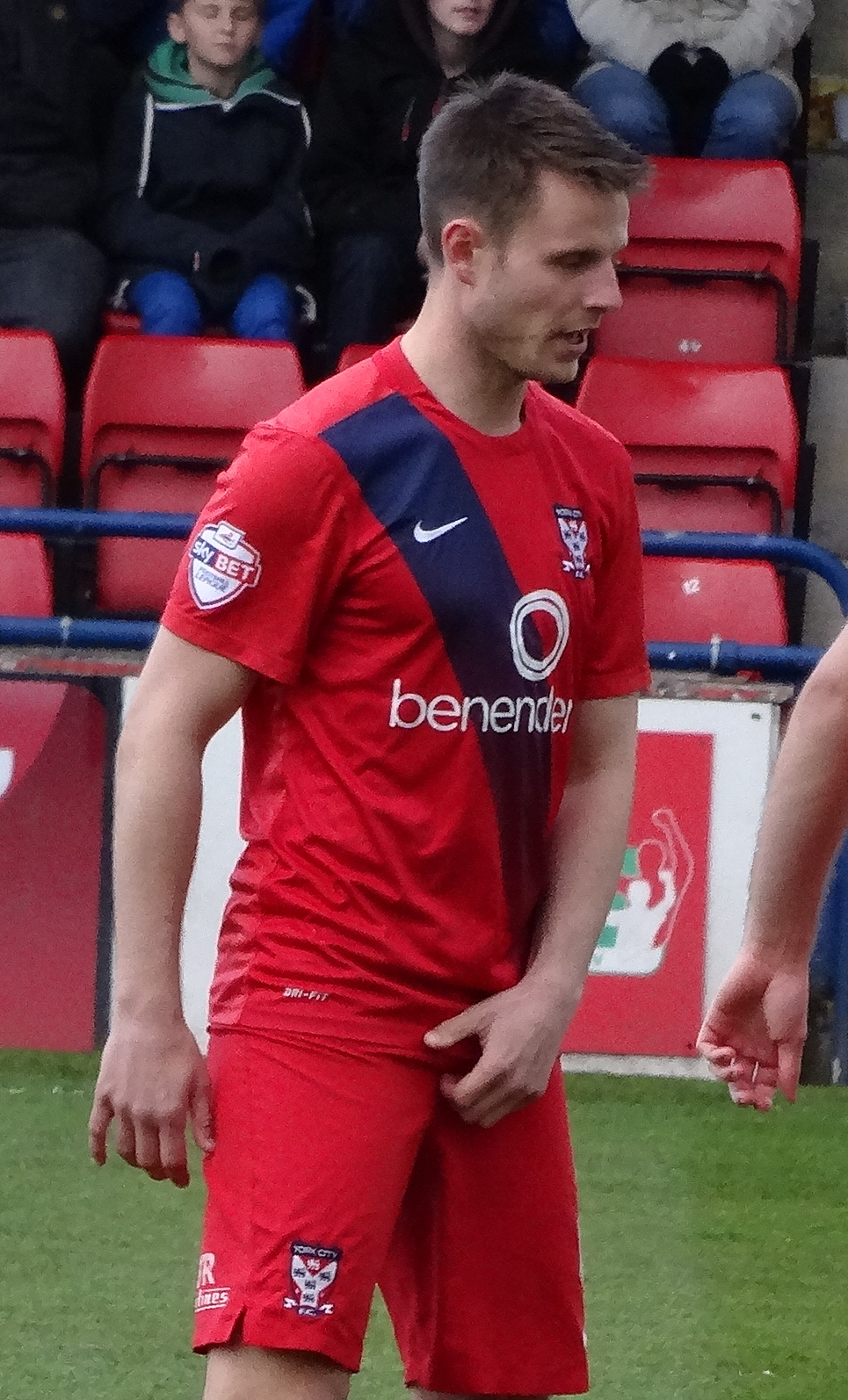
- Berrett playing for York City in 2016

Personal information
- Full name: James Trevor Berrett
- Date of birth: 13 January 1989 (age 37)
- Place of birth: Halifax, England
- Height: 5 ft 10 in (1.78 m)
- Position: Midfielder

Youth career
- –2007: Huddersfield Town

Senior career*
Years	Team	Apps	(Gls)
2007–2010	Huddersfield Town	35	(2)
2010–2014	Carlisle United	170	(23)
2014–2015	Yeovil Town	28	(1)
2015–2016	York City	36	(4)
2016–2018	Grimsby Town	51	(3)
2018–2019	FC Halifax Town	26	(0)
2019–2021	Grantham Town	42	(2)
2021–2022	Newark Flowserve	23	(1)
Total		411	(36)

International career
2007	Republic of Ireland U18	3	(0)
2007–2008	Republic of Ireland U19	5	(0)
2008	Republic of Ireland U21	5	(0)
- * Club domestic league appearances and goals

James Trevor Berrett (born 13 January 1989) is a former professional footballer who played as a midfielder.

Berrett has played professionally in the Football League with Huddersfield Town, Carlisle United, Yeovil Town, York City and Grimsby Town before moving into Non-league football in 2018 with FC Halifax Town. He finished his career with spells at Grantham Town and Newark Flowserve. He is a former Republic of Ireland U19 and U21 international, earning a combined total of ten caps.

== Club career ==
Berrett was born in Halifax, West Yorkshire. He is a product of the Huddersfield Town academy, and made his first-team debut at Boundary Park when he came on as a 69th-minute substitute in the 1–1 draw with Oldham Athletic in April 2007. He signed a professional contract with Huddersfield on 5 July 2007.

Berrett made his full debut in Huddersfield's third round FA Cup win over Premier League team Birmingham City on 5 January 2008. The following week he made his first full league debut in Huddersfield's 3–1 defeat at home to Gillingham.

His first goal for Hudersifled came in the 3–2 win against Bristol Rovers at the Memorial Stadium on 22 March 2008.

On 13 May 2008, he signed a new two-year deal at the Galpharm Stadium. On 6 August 2008, he scored to give Huddersfield the lead in their centenary match against Arsenal at the Galpharm Stadium, in which they lost 2–1.

Following Stan Ternent's departure as Huddersfield manager, caretaker boss Gerry Murphy deployed Berrett in a sweeper role as part of a back five. Then, following Lee Clark's decision to revert to the 4–4–2 formation, Berrett found himself out of the team again, but following an illness to Anthony Pilkington, just before the match against Crewe Alexandra in February 2009, he got back in the starting line-up and scored a goal, but Huddersfield lost the match 3–1.

He signed a contract extension which would keep him at the club until 2012

Berrett made nine appearances only stating two with seven coming off the bench in the 2009–10 season. He made his first appearances of the season coming on as a 56th-minute substitute for Lee Peltier in Huddersfield's League Cup second round tie away at Newcastle United.His first start of the season came in Huddersfield's 1–0 away defeat at Colchester United on 3 October 2009. His first home appearance did not come until 12 December 2009, when he came on as a 90th-minute substitute in Huddersfield's 2–1 home win over Gillingham.

After being put on the transfer list by manager Lee Clark, Berrett left Huddersfield to sign for fellow League One club Carlisle United on a free transfer on 6 July 2010. On 11 June it was confirmed that Berrett would sign a new two-year deal with Carlisle.

On 3 July 2014, Berrett signed for Yeovil Town on a two-year contract after he failed to agree a new contract at Carlisle. After an injury-plagued start to the season Berrett made 32 appearances for Yeovil scoring once, the winner against Swindon Town in April 2015. At the end of the season, following Yeovil's relegation into League Two, Berrett was one of four players offered a contract termination by new manager Paul Sturrock.

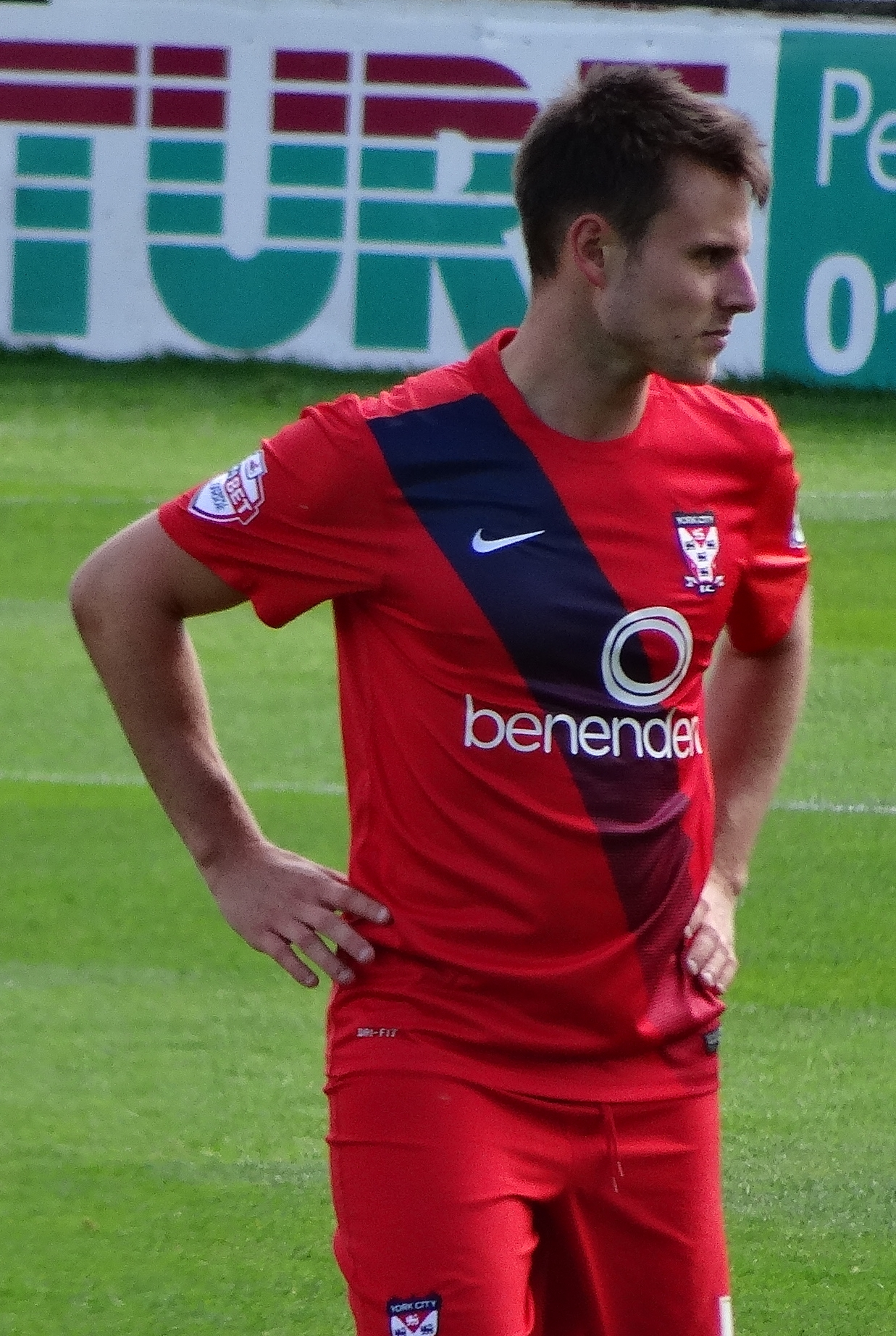
Berrett playing for York City in 2015

Berrett signed for League Two club York City on 23 June 2015 on a two-year contract after agreeing to terminate his deal with Yeovil.

Barrett signed for League Two club Grimsby Town on 30 June 2016 on a two-year contract for an undisclosed fee. He was released by Grimsby at the end of the 2017–18 season.

On 25 August 2018, Berrett joined National League side FC Halifax Town.

On 27 June 2019, Berrett signed with Grantham Town.

== International career ==
On 7 February 2007, Berrett made his debut for the Republic of Ireland national under-18 team when starting their 0–0 home draw in a friendly with the Netherlands. He started their first two matches of the Four-Nations Tournament in Portugal, but was dropped for the final match, which the Republic of Ireland won to win the tournament. Berrett finished his under-18 career with three cap, all earned in 2007. Berrett debuted for the under-19 team in their 2–1 home win over Chile in a friendly on 7 August 2007. He earned five caps for the under-19s, from 2007 to 2008.

He was called up to the under-21 team for the Intercontinental Cup in Malaysia, and made his debut with a start in a 3–1 win over Malaysia on 15 May 2008. Berrett was dropped for their second group match, before starting the draw in their final group match, which saw them knocked out of the tournament. He was capped five times by the under-21s, with all these appearances coming in 2008.

== Career statistics ==
As of end of 2017–18 season

Appearances and goals by club, season and competition
Club	Season	League			FA Cup		League Cup		Other		Total	
Club	Season	Division	Apps	Goals	Apps	Goals	Apps	Goals	Apps	Goals	Apps	Goals
Huddersfield Town	2006–07	League One	2	0	0	0	0	0	0	0	2	0
Huddersfield Town	2007–08	League One	15	1	2	0	0	0	0	0	17	1
Huddersfield Town	2008–09	League One	9	1	0	0	0	0	1 (Note: Appearance(s) in Football League Trophy)	0	10	1
Huddersfield Town	2009–10	League One	9	0	1	0	1	0	1	0	12	0
Huddersfield Town	Total		35	2	3	0	1	0	2	0	41	2
Carlisle United	2010–11	League One	46	10	3	0	1	0	6	0	56	10
Carlisle United	2011–12	League One	42	9	2	1	2	0	1	0	47	10
Carlisle United	2012–13	League One	42	2	1	1	3	0	1	0	47	3
Carlisle United	2013–14	League One	40	2	4	1	2	1	2	0	48	4
Carlisle United	Total		170	23	10	3	8	1	10	0	198	27
Yeovil Town	2014–15	League One	28	1	3	0	1	0	0	0	32	1
York City	2015–16	League Two	36	4	0	0	2	1	2	0	40	5
Grimsby Town	2016–17	League Two	19	2	1	0	1	0	2 (Note: Appearances in EFL Trophy)	0	23	2
Grimsby Town	2017–18	League Two	32	1	1	0	1	0	0	0	34	1
Grimsby Town	Total		51	3	2	0	2	0	2	0	57	3
Career total			320	33	18	3	14	2	16	0	368	38

== Honours ==
Carlisle United

- Football League Trophy: 2010–11
