= Michael Collins (footballer, born 1986) =

Irish footballer (born 1986)

Personal information
- Full name: Michael Anthony Collins
- Date of birth: 30 April 1986 (age 40)
- Place of birth: Halifax, England
- Height: 6 ft 0 in (1.83 m)
- Position: Midfielder

Team information
- Current team: Sheffield United (Assistant Manager)

Youth career
- –2004: Huddersfield Town

Senior career*
Years	Team	Apps	(Gls)
2004–2010	Huddersfield Town	173	(21)
2010–2014	Scunthorpe United	79	(2)
2014	→ AFC Wimbledon (loan)	9	(0)
2014–2016	Oxford United	39	(2)
2015	→ York City (loan)	7	(0)
2016	Bengaluru	11	(2)
2016–2017	Leyton Orient	30	(0)
2017–2018	FC Halifax Town	22	(4)
2018–2019	Alfreton Town	3	(0)
Total		373	(31)

International career
2003	Republic of Ireland U18	13	
2003–2005	Republic of Ireland U19		
2007–2008	Republic of Ireland U21	6	(2)

Managerial career
- 2018: Bradford City
- * Club domestic league appearances and goals

Michael Anthony Collins (born 30 April 1986) is an Irish football player and coach. He is the Assistant Manager for Sheffield United.

As a player, he has played club football for Huddersfield Town, Scunthorpe United, AFC Wimbledon, Oxford United, York City, Leyton Orient and FC Halifax Town; he also had a spell playing in India for I-League side Bengaluru and represented the Republic of Ireland under-18, under-19 and under-21 teams.

== Club career ==
=== Huddersfield Town ===
Collins was born in Halifax, West Yorkshire. Having come through Huddersfield Town's academy, he made his first team debut in a 1–0 home win over Blackpool on 19 February 2005. Collins made eight appearances in the 2004–05 season, with seven of them being starts. He signed a professional contract with the club on 11 May 2005.

He made his first start of the 2005–06 season coming on as an 89th-minute substitute in a 3–1 home win over Swansea City on 13 August 2005. His first start came in a 4–2 away win in the League Cup over Chesterfield on 24 August 2005. Collins scored his first goal on 18 February 2006 in a 5–0 win over Milton Keynes Dons. He came on as a substitute in the FA Cup third round tie in January 2006 against Premier League champions Chelsea, and set-up Gary Taylor-Fletcher for an equaliser. Collins made 21 appearances in all competitions Huddersfield in 2005–06.

Collins made his first appearance of 2006–07 on the opening day of the season, coming on in the 66th minute in a 2–1 away defeat away to Gillingham. He made his first start of the season in a 2–0 defeat by Mansfield Town at home in the first round of the League Cup on 22 August 2006. His first league start of the season came on 26 August 2006 in a 1–1 draw at home with Nottingham Forest. Collins scored his first goal of the season in a 2–1 away win over Port Vale on 21 October 2006. He scored in the last two matches of the season; first in a 4–2 win over Millwall on 21 April 2007 and then on the final day in a 3–1 win over Leyton Orient on 5 May. Collins finished 2006–07 with 46 appearances in all competitions, starting 41 with five coming off the bench, scoring four goals.

He scored his first league goal of 2007–08 in Huddersfield's 2–0 win over Yeovil Town at Huish Park on 2 February 2008. During 2007–08, Huddersfield manager Andy Ritchie tended to use Collins as cover in right-back and right-midfield positions, but he mainly tended to use Collins in tandem with Andy Holdsworth in Huddersfield's central midfield. On 16 February 2008, Collins equalised Frank Lampard's goal on the stroke of half-time in the FA Cup fifth round at Stamford Bridge against Chelsea. However, Huddersfield lost the match 3–1.

After being left out of the first-team squad for most of the first part of 2008–09 by manager Stan Ternent, he was re-called to the team by caretaker manager Gerry Murphy to play in the FA Cup first-round tie at home to Port Vale. Collins scored Huddersfield's equaliser, but was unable to prevent them losing 4–3. A week later, Collins scored his first league goal of the season, with a 90th-minute winner in a 2–1 win at Elland Road against local rivals Leeds United. Collins scored 10 goals in 2008–09, from 39 appearances.

Collins gained a red card in Huddersfield's first match of 2009–10 away to Southend United on 8 August 2009. His first goal of the season came in the 65th minute of Huddersfield's 2–1 home victory over Yeovil Town on 29 August 2009. Collins was ruled out for the remainder of 2009–10 in April 2010, following surgery on a broken finger, but he returned as a substitute in the 2–1 defeat at Exeter City. He then came on as an 89th-minute substitute in the first leg of Huddersfield's play-off semi-final match with Millwall, and was an unused substitute in the second leg defeat at The Den on 18 May 2010. Collins made 35 appearances in 2009–10, scoring three goals. Along with seven other players, he was added to the transfer list by manager Lee Clark in May 2010.

=== Scunthorpe United ===
Collins joined Championship club Scunthorpe United on 6 July 2010 for an undisclosed fee on a three-year contract.

On 20 February 2014, Collins joined AFC Wimbledon on loan for the rest of the 2013–14 season.

=== Oxford United ===
On 15 July 2014, Collins signed a one-year deal at Oxford United, becoming new manager Michael Appleton's first signing. Appleton said: "Michael has played 300 league games, most of them at a higher level, and will bring a little bit of know-how and quality to the squad." He made 43 appearances for Oxford, scoring twice, before joining their League Two rivals York City on 2 October 2015 on a one-month loan. Collins left Oxford by mutual agreement on 7 January 2016, after failing to make any first-team appearances in the 2015–16 season.

=== Bengaluru ===
On 21 January 2016, Collins signed for I-League club Bengaluru. He played a total of 11 league matches for the Blues' and left the club in May 2016.

=== Leyton Orient ===
On 28 October 2016, Collins signed for Leyton Orient on a three-month contract. He turned down the offer of a new one-year contract with Orient at the end of 2016–17, after the club's relegation to the National League.

=== FC Halifax Town ===
On 9 December 2017, Collins came out of retirement to sign for his hometown club, FC Halifax Town of the National League.

=== Alfreton Town ===
He returned to playing in December 2018 with Alfreton Town.

== International career ==
Qualifying through the parentage rule, Collins made his international debut in a Republic of Ireland under-18 match in April 2003. He was the captain of the Irish under-19 squad and on 14 March 2007, he got his first call-up to the Republic of Ireland under-21 squad for a match against the Netherlands. However, he was forced to withdraw from the squad after picking up a shoulder injury in a league match for Huddersfield against Brighton & Hove Albion.

Collins made his under-21 debut against Germany in a friendly match at the Sportpark Ronhof in Fürth on 21 August 2007. His home debut came against Portugal at Turners Cross in Cork on 7 September 2007. On 15 May 2008, he scored his first goals for the under-21s in a 3–1 win over Malaysia in an Intercontinental Cup match in Malaysia. Collins made six appearances scoring twice between 2007 and 2008.

== Coaching career ==
=== Bradford Under 18's ===
In July 2017, Collins joined League One club Bradford City as their under-18s lead coach.

=== Bradford head coach ===
He was appointed head coach of Bradford City on 18 June 2018, with Martin Drury and Greg Abbott named as his assistants. He won his first league game, 1–0 away at Shrewsbury, but won only one more game out of 7 in total, and was sacked by the club on 3 September 2018. He later became a coach at Sunderland's academy.

=== Sheffield United ===
In November 2020, Collins joined the Sheffield United Academy as a midfield position specific coach. During the following summer of 2021, Collins was appointed as the head of individual development for the Under 21's and below.

In January 2022, and following Paul Heckingbottoms promotion to the manager of the football club, Collins was appointed the lead under 21 coach. Collins would go on to lead the under 21's to the Professional Development League North title. In the season of 2022–2023, Collins would again lead them to another Northern title. They then narrowly missed out on the Professional Development League National Title, losing 2–1 to Millwall FC in extra time.

For season 2023-2024 Collins, and the under 21's, would go one better. They succeeded in doing the double of Professional Development League North Champions, as well as beating Birmingham City 2–0 in the National Title Final.

In the summer of 2024, Collins was promoted to join Chris Wilders staff as first team coach ahead of the 2024–2025 season.

== Personal life ==
He is the cousin of professional rugby league players Scott Grix and Simon Grix.

== Career statistics ==
Appearances and goals by club, season and competition
Club	Season	League			National Cup (Note: Appearances in FA Cup)		League Cup		Other		Total	
Club	Season	Division	Apps	Goals	Apps	Goals	Apps	Goals	Apps	Goals	Apps	Goals
Huddersfield Town	2004–05	League One	8	0	0	0	0	0	0	0	8	0
Huddersfield Town	2005–06	League One	17	1	2	0	1	0	1 (Note: Appearance(s) in Football League Trophy)	0	21	1
Huddersfield Town	2006–07	League One	43	4	1	0	1	0	1	0	46	4
Huddersfield Town	2007–08	League One	41	2	5	1	1	0	1	1	48	4
Huddersfield Town	2008–09	League One	36	9	1	1	1	0	1	0	39	10
Huddersfield Town	2009–10	League One	28	3	3	0	1	0	3 (Note: Two appearances in Football League Trophy, one in League One play-offs)	0	35	3
Huddersfield Town	Total		173	19	12	2	5	0	7	1	197	22
Scunthorpe United	2010–11	Championship	32	1	1	1	3	1	—		36	3
Scunthorpe United	2011–12	League One	1	0	0	0	1	0	1	0	3	0
Scunthorpe United	2012–13	League One	29	1	1	0	0	0	0	0	30	1
Scunthorpe United	2013–14	League Two	17	0	2	0	1	0	0	0	20	0
Scunthorpe United	Total		79	2	4	1	5	1	1	0	89	4
AFC Wimbledon (loan)	2013–14	League Two	9	0	—		—		—		9	0
Oxford United	2014–15	League Two	39	2	2	0	2	0	0	0	43	2
Oxford United	2015–16	League Two	0	0	0	0	0	0	0	0	0	0
Oxford United	Total		39	2	2	0	2	0	0	0	43	2
York City (loan)	2015–16	League Two	7	0	1	0	—		2	0	10	0
Bengaluru	2015–16	I-League	10	0			—		6 (Note: Appearances in AFC Cup)	0	16	0
Leyton Orient	2016–17	League Two	30	0	0	0	—		1 (Note: Appearance in EFL Trophy)	0	31	0
FC Halifax Town	2017–18	National League	22	0	—		—		1 (Note: Appearance in FA Trophy)	0	23	0
Career total			369	23	19	3	12	1	18	1	418	28

== Managerial statistics ==
As of match played 1 September 2018

Managerial record by team and tenure
Team	Nat	From	To	Record								Ref
Team	Nat	From	To	G	W	D	L	GF	GA	GD	Win %	Ref
Bradford City	(England)	18 June 2018	3 September 2018	7	2	1	4	5	9	−4	28.57	
Career Total				7	2	1	4	5	9	−4	28.57	—

== Honours ==
Scunthorpe United

- Football League Two runner-up: 2013–14

Bengaluru

- I-League: 2015–16
