= Daniel Broadbent =

English footballer (born 1990)

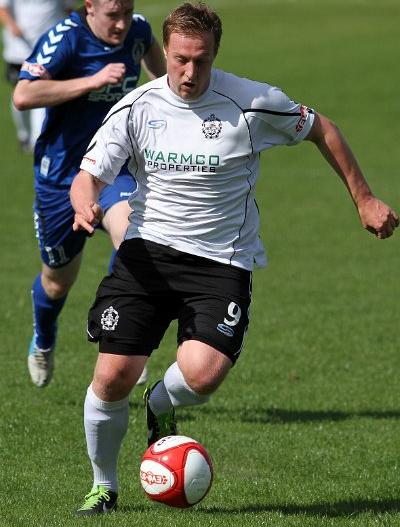
- Broadbent playing for Mossley in 2013

Personal information
- Full name: Daniel James Broadbent
- Date of birth: 2 March 1990 (age 36)
- Place of birth: Leeds, England
- Position: Forward

Team information
- Current team: Hyde

Youth career
- Howden Clough
- Clifton
- Huddersfield Town

Senior career*
Years	Team	Apps	(Gls)
2007–2009	Huddersfield Town	6	(0)
2009	→ Rushden & Diamonds (loan)	3	(0)
2009	→ Gateshead (loan)	5	(0)
2009	→ Harrogate Town (loan)	8	(1)
2009–2010	Harrogate Town	13	(1)
2010	→ Frickley Athletic (loan)	?	(?)
2010	Frickley Athletic	?	(?)
2010–2011	Curzon Ashton	?	(?)
2011–2013	Hyde	35	(7)
2013	→ Mossley (loan)	16	(0)
2013–	Mossley	7	(3)

International career^{‡}
2005	England U-16	1	(0)
- * Club domestic league appearances and goals as of 07:08, 20 September 2013 (UTC) ‡ National team caps and goals as of 22 August 2011

Daniel James Broadbent (born 2 March 1990) is a footballer who plays as a striker for Mossley. He received his only England U-16 cap against Northern Ireland U-16 in the Victory Shield in 2005.

== Career ==
=== Huddersfield Town ===
Born in Leeds, He first appeared in the Huddersfield first team, when he was called up to the bench for their home game against Oldham Athletic on 20 October 2007, following Andy Booth's back injury.

He made his first team debut replacing Joe Skarz as a substitute in Town's 3–0 defeat against Tranmere Rovers at Prenton Park on 26 October 2007. On 2 March 2008, Broadbent emulated teammate Joe Skarz's achievement of last season by winning the League One Apprentice Award at the Football League Awards in London. It was also his 18th birthday that day, giving him twice as much reasons to celebrate. Two weeks later, he made his first home appearance for Town at the Galpharm Stadium in their 2–1 defeat by Southend United. On 15 January 2009, new Town manager Lee Clark sent Broadbent out on loan to Conference National side Rushden & Diamonds, where he was given the number 9 shirt by manager Garry Hill. He made his debut in the 1–0 defeat for Rushden & Diamonds on 17 January. He returned to Huddersfield on 16 February.

On 19 February 2009, he joined Gateshead on an initial one-month loan, with a view to being extended until the end of the season. He made his debut 21 February in the 1–0 win against Hucknall Town at the Gateshead International Stadium. He returned to the Galpharm on 19 March.

=== Non-League ===
On 24 March 2009, he joined Conference North side Harrogate Town on loan. He made his debut that night in the 1–0 defeat by Workington. His first goal came in the 2–1 defeat at Redditch United on 21 March 2009. After returning from his loan spell, he was released. Broadbent was quickly signed by former loan side Harrogate Town in time for the start of the 2009–2010 season but only made another 13 league appearances adding a solitary strike against Hyde United to his total. Eventually with only a month of the campaign left he joined Frickley Athletic on loan and then permanently following his release from The CNG Stadium at the end of the season.

In August 2011, he signed for Hyde, following manager Gary Lowe from Curzon Ashton. He made his debut for Hyde in a 2–1 win over Worcester City in August 2011. He went on to score his first goal for the club later that month as his side won 2–0 at Gloucester City. He finished the season with seven goals in 37 games.

Due to injury reasons he was sent to Mossley in February 2013, where he played 16 times failing to score, before going back to Hyde. On his return to Hyde, he was called straight into the squad for the trip to Alfreton Town, in which Broadbent came off the bench to score Hyde's only goal in a 5–1 defeat.

He joined Mossley on a permanent basis before the start of the 2013–14 season. He scored his first goal for the club, scoring in the last minute to earn his team a point in a 1–1 draw with Clitheroe.
