= Shane Killock =

English footballer

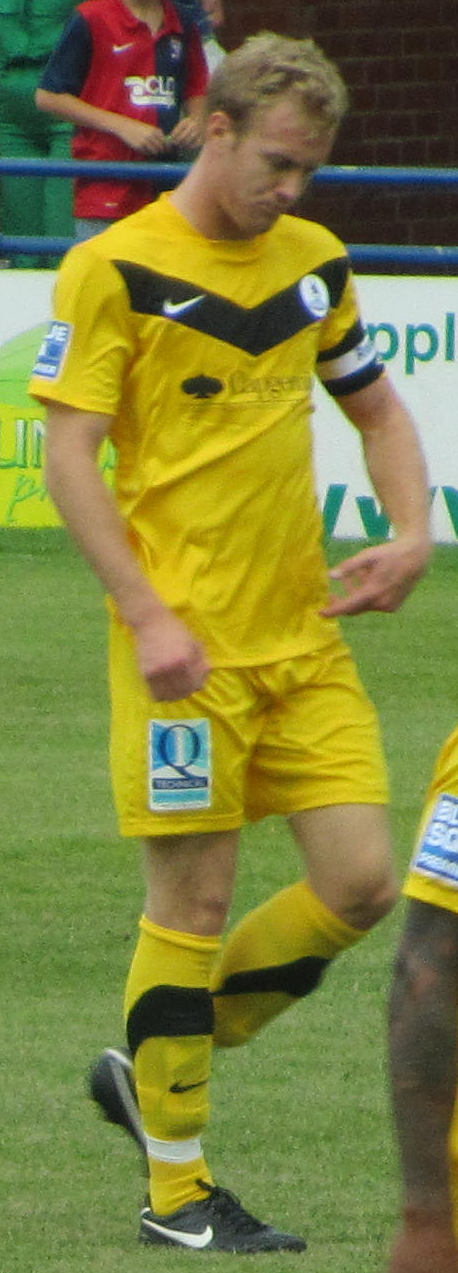
- Killock playing for AFC Telford United in 2011

Personal information
- Full name: Shane Adam Killock
- Date of birth: 12 March 1989 (age 37)
- Place of birth: Huddersfield, England
- Position: Centre-back

Youth career
- Huddersfield Town

Senior career*
Years	Team	Apps	(Gls)
2005–2006	Ossett Albion		
2006–2009	Huddersfield Town	1	(0)
2008	→ Hyde United (loan)	13	(0)
2008	→ Harrogate Town (loan)	6	(0)
2009	→ Oxford United (loan)	3	(0)
2009	Oxford United	0	(0)
2009	→ Telford United (loan)		
2009–2012	Telford United	132	(4)
2012–2015	Harrogate Town	78	(8)
2014–2015	→ Guiseley (loan)	8	(0)
2015–2016	Hyde United	20	(1)
2016–2019	Bradford Park Avenue	91	(8)
2017	→ Boston United (loan)	3	(0)
2019–2020	Alfreton Town	18	(0)
2020–2021	Buxton	4	(1)
2021–2022	Stalybridge Celtic	17	(1)
2022–2023	Mossley	26	(0)
2023–2024	Ossett United	20	(1)
2024–2025	Golcar United	13	(1)
- * Club domestic league appearances and goals as of 16:52, 23 January 2025 (UTC)

Shane Adam Killock (born 12 March 1989) is a retired English footballer who played as a defender.

== Career ==
As a youngster, Killock was released from Huddersfield Town's youth system. He joined Ossett Albion, where he played in the Northern Premier League as a 15-year-old schoolboy. He rejoined Huddersfield's Academy in early 2006, and in September 2007 received his first call-up to the first team squad for the Football League Trophy match against Grimsby Town. He made an unexpected Football League debut in Town's match at Gresty Road against Crewe Alexandra on 7 September, mainly because of injury to Nathan Clarke and Frank Sinclair and on-loan Richard Keogh's absence on international duty with the Ireland under-21 team.

In January 2008, the contracts of Killock and fellow Town youngster Simon Eastwood were extended until 2009. On 15 February, he joined Conference North side Hyde United on loan. He made his debut the next day in Hyde's 2–1 defeat to AFC Telford United. He was highly praised for his performances at the Tigers and received the man of the match award for his performance in Hyde's 3–1 win over Worcester City a week later. He returned to the Galpharm Stadium at the end of the season.

Killock spent September 2008 on loan at Conference North side Harrogate Town. He made his debut on 2 September in their 2–0 win over A.F.C. Telford United, and returned to Huddersfield on 7 October.

In January 2009, new manager Lee Clark sent Killock out on a month's loan to Oxford United. He made his debut in the FA Trophy loss to York City, before making his league debut in a 1–0 win over Altrincham. At the end of the loan spell, Killock was released from his Huddersfield contract and signed a permanent deal with Oxford United until the end of the season. Killock's contract was then extended, despite his progress having been disrupted by injuries, then, at the start of the 2009–10 season, he joined Conference North side A.F.C. Telford United on loan. The move was made permanent in November 2009.

Killock was named AFC Telford United captain in August 2010, and that season captained the Bucks to promotion via the play-offs to the Conference National, he also won a player of the season award at the clubs awards night. He was released by the club in May 2012. After his release from Telford he then signed for former club Harrogate.

On 28 May 2019, Killock joined Alfreton Town.

He signed for Northern Premier League Premier League side Stalybridge Celtic on a free transfer in September 2021 and departed from the club in June 2022. In July 2022, he signed with Mossley. He departed on November 15, 2023. The following day, Killock joined Ossett United. Ahead of the 2024-25 season, Killock moved to Golcar United. In July 2025, Killock retired from football.
