= Alex Smithies =

English footballer (born 1990)

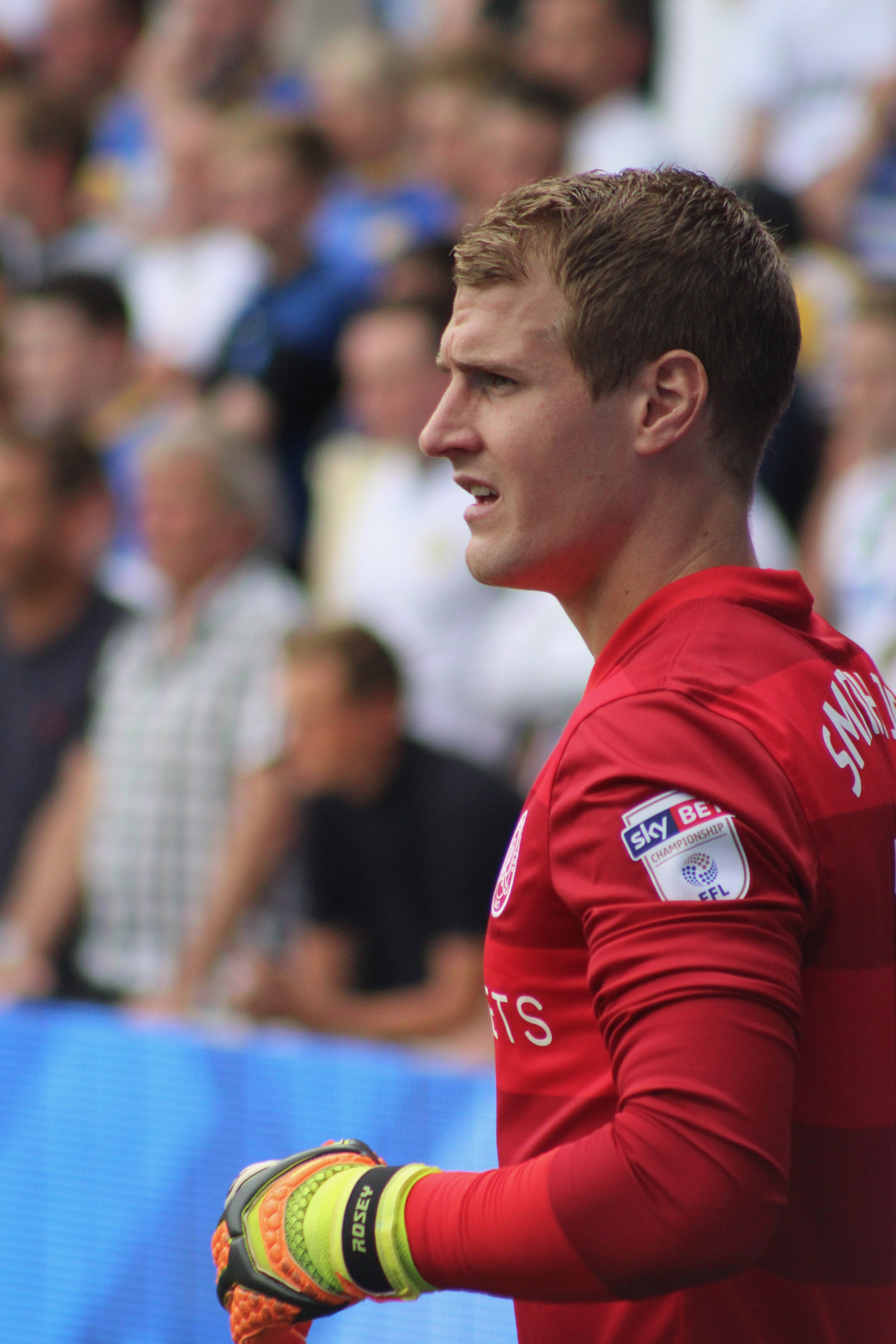
- Smithies playing for Queens Park Rangers in 2016

Personal information
- Full name: Alexander Smithies
- Date of birth: 5 March 1990 (age 36)
- Place of birth: Huddersfield, England
- Height: 6 ft 1 in (1.85 m)
- Position: Goalkeeper

Youth career
- 1998–2007: Huddersfield Town

Senior career*
Years	Team	Apps	(Gls)
2007–2015	Huddersfield Town	247	(0)
2015–2018	Queens Park Rangers	107	(0)
2018–2022	Cardiff City	90	(0)
2022–2024	Leicester City	0	(0)
Total		444	(0)

International career
2005–2006	England U16	4	(0)
2005–2007	England U17	9	(0)
2007	England U18	1	(0)
2009	England U19	1	(0)
- * Club domestic league appearances and goals

Alexander Smithies (born 5 March 1990) is an English former professional footballer who played as a goalkeeper.

Smithies is a product of the Huddersfield Town academy who first came into prominence during the 2007–08 season. He joined Queens Park Rangers in 2015 before joining Cardiff City in 2018.

Smithies joined Leicester City in 2022. He made no appearances for the club and retired due to injury in 2024.

== Early life ==
Smithies was born in Huddersfield, West Yorkshire. He grew up in Golcar, in the Colne Valley area of Huddersfield. He attended Colne Valley High School, Linthwaite. He grew up supporting Huddersfield Town. Smithies previously played football for Westend Juniors in Huddersfield's local leagues, and he joined the Huddersfield Town academy at the age of 8.

== Club career ==
=== Huddersfield Town ===
==== Early seasons 2007–2009 ====
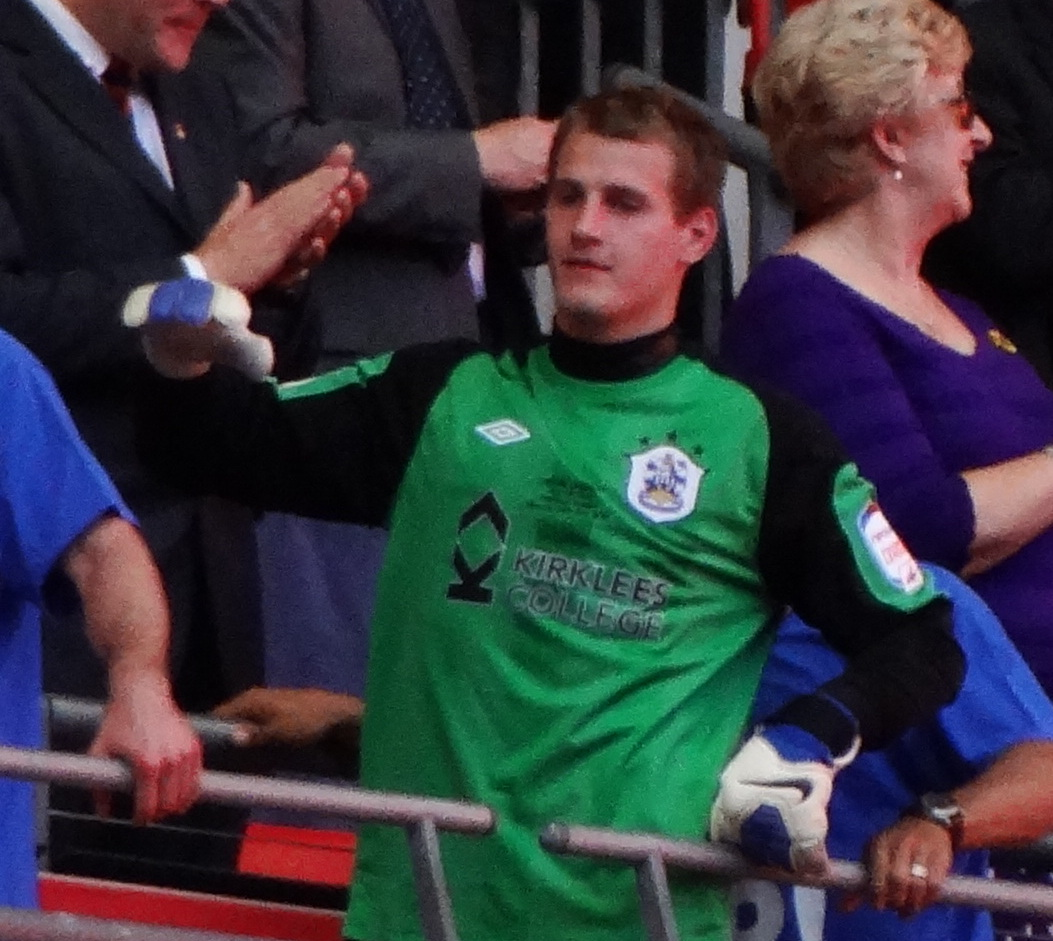
Smithies with Huddersfield Town after the 2012 League One play-off final

Having come through the Academy of the club he grew up supporting, Smithies made his first-team début on 5 December 2007. He came on as a 76th-minute substitute after Matt Glennon was sent off during Huddersfield Town's 4–1 defeat by Southend United at Roots Hall. His full début came in a 4–0 defeat at Leeds United on 8 December, after Glennon lost an appeal against his dismissal and Town were refused permission to loan an emergency goalkeeper on the grounds that Smithies was registered as a professional.

Smithies' first appearance at the Galpharm Stadium for a first-team match was on 6 December 2008. In this match, caretaker manager Gerry Murphy dropped regular goalkeeper Matt Glennon in favour of Smithies, who went on to help Huddersfield to a 2–1 victory over Walsall. The first clean sheet he kept for the club came on 13 December 2008. In the 1–0 win over Southend United, Smithies saved a penalty from James Walker, ten minutes from time. Smithies became the first-choice keeper for the remainder of the 2008–09 season and, after the arrival of manager Lee Clark, made the number one jersey his own.

==== 2009–10 season and first team ====
Throughout the 2009–10 season, Smithies was the only player to play in each and every league and cup match for Huddersfield. He made 48 starts, 17 of which resulted in a clean sheet for the Terriers. His contribution in helping Huddersfield to a final position inside the League One playoffs was reflected by him winning the club's Young Player of the Year Trophy.

In conceding just 56 goals in such a competitive campaign, he won both praise and admiration from many quarters; earning the Football League's Young Player of the Month award in February 2010 along the way. On 17 November 2009 Smithies was linked with Stoke City after a scout from the club was the latest in a long string of Premier League interest to be seen at the Galpharm. This interest was played down by Lee Clark and Tony Coton, and Smithies insisted he was happy to be at Huddersfield. Smithies was named as the Football League Young Player of the Month for February 2010 after keeping three clean sheets in seven undefeated Huddersfield Town matches.

==== 2010–11 season ====
Smithies' 2010–11 campaign was punctuated by injury, restricting him to just 27 appearances in all competitions throughout the season. His performances, on the occasions he did play, earned him a call up to the England under-21 squad, although he was unable to play – again due to injury.

In January 2011, he was linked with a £1.5m move to Aston Villa, after Villa manager Gérard Houllier was said to have been impressed with his performance against Sheffield Wednesday.

Further speculation relating to his future at the club followed Huddersfield's 3–0 defeat against Peterborough United in the League One play-off final, and he was linked with a move to Leicester City, along with teammate Lee Peltier. However, when Leicester had a bid for Kasper Schmeichel accepted by Leeds United in June, speculation that Smithies could be heading for Leeds was rejected by Huddersfield chief executive Nigel Clibbens.

==== 2011–12 season and promotion ====
Smithies' absence from the squad during 2010–11 through injury allowed Ian Bennett to become first choice goalkeeper, backed up by fellow veteran Nick Colgan. His injury meant he remained sidelined for the first half of the season and had to wait until 14 February 2012 to make his first appearance in the 2011–12 campaign. This came in the 1–0 home defeat to Sheffield United, a result which would cost manager Lee Clark his job the following day. This was followed by his first clean sheet of the campaign in Huddersfield's 2–0 home win over Exeter City on 25 February 2012. During the second leg League One play-off match against Milton Keynes Dons he came on as a substitute for Bennett, who had gone off with an injured hand. Town lost the match 2–1 but reached the final against Sheffield United 3–2 on aggregate. Smithies started in the final, which finished 0–0 thanks to some excellent saves from the young custodian. In the penalty shoot-out Smithies performed more heroics, saving three of the Sheffield penalties. After ten penalties each, the sides were still inseparable, and Smithies and opposite number Steve Simonsen stepped up to take the next penalties for their sides. Smithies scored in emphatic fashion, before Simonsen put his penalty over the bar to give promotion to the Terriers.

==== 2012–13 season ====
On 17 August 2012, Smithies began his debut season in the Championship with Huddersfield in a 1–0 away defeat at eventual league winners Cardiff City. He went on to start all 46 of Huddersfield's Championship fixtures, as well as all but one of the club's five cup matches during the season, conceding 79 goals in the process.

==== 2013–14 season ====
Smithies started his second season in the Championship how he started his first, by starting all Huddersfield's opening eleven fixtures in all competitions, conceding ten goals during that time. On 25 September 2013, Smithies signed a one-year contract extension at the club, keeping him at the John Smith's Stadium at least until the summer of 2016, with the option for a further year.

==== 2014–15 season ====
Smithies started his third season in the Championship as first choice goalkeeper, ahead of Joe Murphy. He conceded four goals on the opening day in a 4–0 home defeat to AFC Bournemouth but did save a penalty. The match would prove to be manager Mark Robins' last for the club.

=== Queens Park Rangers ===
On 20 August 2015, Smithies joined Queens Park Rangers for an undisclosed fee, signing a three-year deal.

==== 2015–16 season ====
Smithies was initially the backup goalkeeper to Robert Green. Due to a clause in his contract, Green did not play from 1 January 2016 to the end of the season. Smithies and Matt Ingram vied for the number 1 spot. He played 18 Championship matches that season.

==== 2016–17 season ====
Smithies was QPR's first choice goalkeeper for the 2016–17 season. He made 46 appearances and kept seven clean sheets. Smithies won the QPR player's player of the season, supporters' player of the season and the Junior Hoops players of the season awards.

=== Cardiff City ===
Smithies signed for newly promoted Premier League club Cardiff City for an undisclosed fee on 28 June 2018, signing a four-year contract. He made his debut in a 3–1 League Cup loss to Norwich City on 28 August.

Smithies made his league debut a year later, in a 2–1 win over Luton Town on 10 August 2019.

On 6 February 2021, Smithies was stretchered off the pitch after becoming unwell during a Severnside derby against Bristol City. Despite being uninvolved in play, Smithies appeared to signal to the referee while waiting for a Bristol City free kick. He then returned to his goal and dropped to his haunches, before eventually lying flat on his back off the pitch where he was treated for eight minutes by medical staff. He sat up, and at one point attempted to stand with the help of a doctor, but sat back down, by which point a stretcher had already been called for. A blood oxygen monitor was applied to his finger, before he was transferred, sitting upright, onto the stretcher and was replaced by Dillon Phillips. Cardiff went on to win the game 2–0, and after the match manager Mick McCarthy reported that Smithies was feeling better, and that they had "no idea" what caused the illness. On 10 June 2022, Cardiff announced Smithies would leave the club when his contract expired on 30 June.

=== Leicester City ===
On 12 August 2022, Smithies signed for Premier League side Leicester City on a free transfer, signing a two-year deal. His time at Leicester was spent as a backup keeper and he made no competitive appearances for the club. Following a run of persistent injuries, he announced his retirement from football on 22 January 2024.

== International career ==
He has four caps for the England U-16s and ten caps for the England U-17s including five during the 2007 FIFA U-17 World Cup in South Korea. In this competition he helped England U-17s make it to the quarter-finals, before they were eventually eliminated by Germany after a 4–1 defeat.

On 20 November 2007, Smithies made his debut for the England U-18 team, where he played 45 minutes in their 2–0 win against Ghana U-18s at Gillingham's Priestfield Stadium. In November 2008, Smithies received his first England U-19 call up for a friendly against Germany U-19. His first match for the U19's came against Spain U-19 at Bournemouth's Dean Court ground on 10 February 2009, in a 3–0 defeat.

On 24 August 2010, Smithies received his first call-up to the England U-21s for their matches against Portugal U-21s and Lithuania U-21s.

== Career statistics ==
Appearances and goals by club, season and competition
Club	Season	League			FA Cup		League Cup		Other		Total	
Club	Season	Division	Apps	Goals	Apps	Goals	Apps	Goals	Apps	Goals	Apps	Goals
Huddersfield Town	2007–08	League One	2	0	0	0	0	0	0	0	2	0
Huddersfield Town	2008–09	League One	27	0	0	0	0	0	1 (Note: Appearance in Football League Trophy)	0	28	0
Huddersfield Town	2009–10	League One	46	0	3	0	2	0	4 (Note: Two appearances in Football League Trophy, two in League One play-offs)	0	55	0
Huddersfield Town	2010–11	League One	22	0	2	0	2	0	1	0	27	0
Huddersfield Town	2011–12	League One	13	0	0	0	0	0	2 (Note: Appearances in League One play-offs)	0	15	0
Huddersfield Town	2012–13	Championship	46	0	3	0	1	0	—		50	0
Huddersfield Town	2013–14	Championship	46	0	2	0	3	0	—		51	0
Huddersfield Town	2014–15	Championship	44	0	1	0	0	0	—		45	0
Huddersfield Town	2015–16	Championship	1	0	—		—		—		1	0
Huddersfield Town	Total		247	0	11	0	8	0	8	0	274	0
Queens Park Rangers	2015–16	Championship	18	0	0	0	1	0	—		19	0
Queens Park Rangers	2016–17	Championship	46	0	0	0	0	0	—		46	0
Queens Park Rangers	2017–18	Championship	43	0	1	0	0	0	—		44	0
Queens Park Rangers	Total		107	0	1	0	1	0	—		109	0
Cardiff City	2018–19	Premier League	0	0	1	0	1	0	—		2	0
Cardiff City	2019–20	Championship	30	0	3	0	0	0	2 (Note: Appearances in Championship play-offs)	0	35	0
Cardiff City	2020–21	Championship	31	0	0	0	1	0	—		32	0
Cardiff City	2021–22	Championship	29	0	0	0	2	0	—		31	0
Cardiff City	Total		90	0	4	0	4	0	2	0	100	0
Leicester City	2022–23	Premier League	0	0	0	0	0	0	—		0	0
Leicester City	2023–24	Championship	0	0	0	0	0	0	—		0	0
Leicester City	Total		0	0	0	0	0	0	0	0	0	0
Career total			444	0	16	0	13	0	10	0	483	0

== Honours ==
Huddersfield Town

- Football League One play-offs: 2012

Individual

- Football League Young Player of the Month: February 2010
- Queens Park Rangers Supporters' Player of the Year: 2016–17
- Queens Park Rangers Players' Player of the Year: 2016–17
