= Joe Skarz =

English footballer (born 1989)

Personal information
- Full name: Joseph Peter Skarz
- Date of birth: 13 July 1989 (age 37)
- Place of birth: Huddersfield, England
- Height: 5 ft 10 in (1.78 m)
- Position: Left-back

Team information
- Current team: Liversedge

Youth career
- Netherton
- Huddersfield Town

Senior career*
Years	Team	Apps	(Gls)
2006–2010	Huddersfield Town	68	(1)
2009	→ Hartlepool United (loan)	7	(0)
2010	→ Shrewsbury Town (loan)	20	(0)
2010–2013	Bury	130	(4)
2013	→ Rotherham United (loan)	8	(0)
2013–2015	Rotherham United	58	(2)
2015–2017	Oxford United	89	(0)
2017–2019	Bury	4	(0)
2018–2019	→ FC Halifax Town (loan)	24	(0)
2019–2020	Kettering Town	14	(1)
2020	Grantham Town	8	(0)
2020–2023	Golcar United	98	(5)
2023–2024	Hallam	8	(0)
2024–	Liversedge	1	(0)
- * Club domestic league appearances and goals as of 12:47, 10 January 2024 (UTC)

Joseph Peter Skarz (born 13 July 1989) is an English professional footballer who plays as a left-back for Northern Premier League Division One East club Liversedge.

== Career ==
=== Huddersfield Town ===
Born in Huddersfield, West Yorkshire, Skarz came through his hometown club's academy. After making progress in the reserves, he made his first-team début on 4 November 2006, playing at left back in a 1–1 draw at home to Scunthorpe United. Manager Peter Jackson announced that Skarz would be the first choice left-back in preference to Danny Adams, although Jackson then signed Blackburn Rovers defender Andy Taylor on loan as competition for Skarz. On 3 February 2007, Skarz signed his first professional contract on a one-year basis since breaking through to the first team that season at left-back.

On 4 March 2007, Skarz received the Football League Award for League One Apprentice. Shortly after, Manager Peter Jackson made comments about Skarz regarding his positive future at Huddersfield Town.

After making twenty-seven appearances in the 2007–08 season, Skarz signed a new three-year contract in May 2008, which was to have kept him until 2011 at the Galpharm Stadium under then new manager Stan Ternent. Then, in the 2008–09 season, Skarz's first goal for the Terriers came against Town's greatest rivals Leeds United at Elland Road on 15 November 2008. The match finished 2–1 to Town. After the game, Gerry Murphy praised Skarz's performance. Skarz himself expressed at scoring his first goal for the club. Despite this, Skarz's first-team opportunities in Lee Clark's squad soon became limited by another left-back player, Robbie Williams once again.

After his loan spell at Hartlepool United came to an end, Skarz made his first start of the 2009–10 season in a 3–1 win over Stockport County in the League Cup. He became a regular in Town's left-back position, but then lost his place in the starting line up to Williams. Skarz was sent out on loan to League Two side Shrewsbury Town in January 2010 after the arrival of Australian international Dean Heffernan. After returning to his parent from a loan spell at Shrewsbury Town, Skarz was among players to be transfer listed ahead of the new season.

=== Loan spells ===
After having his first-team place limited at Huddersfield Town, Skarz joined fellow League One side Hartlepool United on loan on 26 March 2009. He made his debut as a substitute the following day in the 3–2 defeat to Southend United at Roots Hall. Skarz returned to his parent club after his loan deal expired having made 7 appearances for Hartlepool United.

Huddersfield manager Lee Clark sent Skarz on loan to League Two side Shrewsbury Town until the end of the season on 21 January 2010. He made his debut two days later, in a 2–1 win over Dagenham & Redbridge at the Prostar Stadium. After making twenty appearances for the club, Skarz returned to the Galpharm at the end of the season, although Shrewsbury manager Graham Turner, who replaced Paul Simpson who in turn managed Skarz during his loan spell, did express an interest in signing Skarz permanently if possible for the 2010–11 season.

=== Bury ===
After being placed on the transfer list by Clark at the end of 2009–10, Skarz left Huddersfield to join Football League Two side Bury. On 7 August 2010, Skarz made his debut for the club in a 1–0 loss against Port Vale and got his first clean sheet at the club in a 2–0 win over Cheltenham Town on 25 September 2010, ending the first seven games without conceding.

His first goal came when he scored the only goal of the game against Southend United on 23 October 2010. In his first season at Bury, Skarz played in every match, and his impressive display earned him a place in the League Two PFA Team of the Year and the Shakers' Young Player of the Season award as the club were promoted to League One. Sky Sports reflected on Skarz's performance, saying: "An ever-present in the league this season, the 21-year-old's displays at left-back have helped the Gigg Lane club maintain one of the best defences in the division."

In the 2011–12 season, Skarz continued to remain in the first team at Bury and made forty-five appearances until, on 17 December 2011, he received his first red card at Bury after committing a second bookable offence against Brentford. During the 2011–12 season, Skarz scored two goals: one was against Sheffield Wednesday on 16 August 2011, in a 2–1 win and another in a 3–2 win over Yeovil Town. Weeks later, on 9 February 2012, Skarz signed a new two-and-a-half-year contract with Bury keeping him at the club until the end of the 2013–14 season.

In the 2012–13 season, Skarz started his season very positively at the start of the season when he scored in a 2–1 loss against Doncaster Rovers on 21 August 2012 and another on 8 September 2012, in a 2–1 loss against Preston North End. Skarz scored another against Preston North End months later in the Northern Section of Football League Trophy. The game went to a penalty shoot-out and Preston won 5–4. Until his departure to Rotherham United, Skarz retained his first-team place as a left back and made thirty-nine league appearances for the club straight.

=== Rotherham United ===
On 28 March 2013, Skarz signed for Rotherham United on loan with a view to a permanent deal. Skarz made his Rotherham United debut the next day, in a 1–0 win over Wimbledon. In total Skarz made eight loan appearances for Rotherham United.

On 29 April 2013, two days after securing promotion to League One, he signed a two-year deal with Rotherham United. By this time, his contract with Bury was due to expire at the end of the 2012–13 season. Skarz's first game after signing for the club on a permanent basis came in the opening game of the season, in a 3–3 draw against Crewe. In the first seven matches at the start of the season, Skarz helped the club to a superb start by going unbeaten and determined to aim for promotion. He scored his first Rotherham United goal in a 3–1 loss to Coventry City. Three months later, on 18 April 2014, Skarz scored his second goal of the season, in a 6–4 loss against Wolverhampton Wanderers. After helping the club secure promotion to the Championship, Skarz made forty-one league appearances for the club, missing five games on the bench or unfit. Skarz played all three games in the club's play-off places and started in the play-off final against Leyton Orient. His determination for promotion was fulfilled when Rotherham United beat Orient in a penalty shoot-out.

In the 2014–15 season, Skarz retained his first-team place at left back until he suffered an injury in late November.

=== Oxford United ===
On 24 January 2015, Skarz signed for Oxford United on a free transfer after leaving Rotherham United the day before. He made his Oxford debut, playing as a left back, in a 2–0 win over Stevenage on 31 January 2015. Later he was regularly selected for the first team in preference to Charlton Athletic loanee Tareiq Holmes-Dennis; Holmes-Dennis was later recalled by his parent club. Skarz later made eighteen appearances for the club in his first half of the season at Oxford United. He was rewarded for his role of helping the club go eight games unbeaten towards the end of the 2014–15 season with a three-year contract at the club. He left the club by mutual consent two years later, following the end of the 2016–17 season. During his Oxford career he was part of the side that won promotion from League Two to League One, and made over a hundred appearances, including 89 in the League.

=== Bury (second spell) ===
On 31 July 2017, Skarz returned to Bury by signing a two-year deal. He made only six appearances in 2017–18 and, in August 2018, he joined FC Halifax Town on a season-long loan.

=== Later career ===
Skarz signed for Kettering Town for the 2019–20 season. In January 2020, he then moved to Grantham Town.

On 24 April 2020, Skarz joined semi-professional side Golcar United as a player-coach. Skarz was also working as an academy coach at Sheffield United.

In September 2023, he joined Northern East Counties Football League Premier Division club Hallam. In January 2024, he joined Liversedge.

== Career statistics ==
As of match played 16 March 2019

Appearances and goals by club, season and competition
Club	Season	League			FA Cup		League Cup		Other		Total	
Club	Season	Division	Apps	Goals	Apps	Goals	Apps	Goals	Apps	Goals	Apps	Goals
Huddersfield Town	2006–07	League One	17	0	1	0	0	0	0	0	18	0
Huddersfield Town	2007–08	League One	27	0	3	0	1	0	1 (Note: Appearance(s) in Football League Trophy)	0	32	0
Huddersfield Town	2008–09	League One	9	1	1	0	0	0	1	0	11	1
Huddersfield Town	2009–10	League One	15	0	1	0	2	0	2	0	20	0
Huddersfield Town	Total		68	1	6	0	3	0	4	0	81	1
Hartlepool United (loan)	2008–09	League One	7	0	0	0	0	0	0	0	7	0
Shrewsbury Town (loan)	2009–10	League Two	20	0	0	0	0	0	0	0	20	0
Bury	2010–11	League Two	46	1	2	0	1	0	2	0	51	1
Bury	2011–12	League One	45	1	1	0	2	0	1	0	49	1
Bury	2012–13	League One	39	2	3	0	1	0	2	1	45	3
Bury	Total		130	4	6	0	4	0	5	1	145	5
Rotherham United (loan)	2012–13	League Two	8	0	0	0	0	0	0	0	8	0
Rotherham United	2013–14	League One	41	2	2	0	2	0	5 (Note: Two appearances in Football League Trophy; three in Football League One play-offs)	0	50	2
Rotherham United	2014–15	Championship	17	0	1	0	2	0	—		20	0
Rotherham United	Total		58	2	3	0	4	0	5	0	70	2
Oxford United	2014–15	League Two	18	0	0	0	0	0	0	0	18	0
Oxford United	2015–16	League Two	41	0	5	0	2	0	3	0	51	0
Oxford United	2016–17	League One	30	0	2	0	2	0	4 (Note: Appearances in EFL Trophy)	0	38	0
Oxford United	Total		89	0	7	0	4	0	7	0	107	0
Bury	2017–18	League One	4	0	0	0	0	0	3	0	7	0
Bury	2018–19	League Two	0	0	0	0	0	0	0	0	0	0
Bury	Total		4	0	0	0	0	0	3	0	7	0
FC Halifax Town (loan)	2018–19	National League	16	0	1	0	0	0	0	0	17	0
Career total			400	7	23	0	15	0	24	1	462	8

== Honours ==
Rotherham United

- Football League One play-offs: 2014

Oxford United

- EFL Trophy runner-up: 2016–17

Individual

- PFA Team of the Year: 2010–11 League Two
