= Tom Denton (footballer) =

English footballer

Personal information
- Full name: Tom Ashley Denton
- Date of birth: 24 July 1989 (age 37)
- Place of birth: Shepley, England
- Height: 6 ft 7 in (2.01 m)
- Position: Striker

Team information
- Current team: Ashton United

Youth career
- –2006: Wakefield

Senior career*
| Years | Team | Apps | (Gls) |
| 2006–2008 | Wakefield | 14 | (5) |
| 2008–2010 | Huddersfield Town | 0 | (0) |
| 2008–2009 | → Woking (loan) | 5 | (2) |
| 2009 | → Wakefield (loan) | 13 | (12) |
| 2009 | → Cheltenham Town (loan) | 2 | (0) |
| 2010 | → Wakefield (loan) | 6 | (4) |
| 2010–2011 | Wakefield | | |
| 2011–2012 | Mossley | 22 | (13) |
| 2012 | Alfreton Town | 3 | (0) |
| 2012 | → Worksop Town (loan) | 11 | (11) |
| 2012–2014 | Worksop Town | | |
| 2014–2016 | North Ferriby United | 80 | (39) |
| 2016–2018 | FC Halifax Town | 74 | (27) |
| 2018 | Alfreton Town | 9 | (6) |
| 2018–2022 | Chesterfield | 78 | (23) |
| 2022–2023 | Alfreton Town | 8 | (3) |
| 2023–2024 | Guiseley | 30 | (6) |
| 2024– | Ashton United | 0 | (0) |
- * Club domestic league appearances and goals as of 14:10, 2 July 2024 (UTC)

Tom Ashley Denton (born 24 July 1989) is a professional footballer who plays as a striker for Northern Premier League Premier Division club Ashton United.

== Career ==
=== Wakefield ===
Born in Shepley, West Yorkshire, Denton began his career playing for non-League side Wakefield in 2006 at the age of 17. He made 14 appearances scoring five goals for Wakefield between 2006 and 2008. He was offered a trial at Premier League side Blackburn Rovers, managing to score for their reserve team. After his trial was completed, he was being looked at by Rovers, Championship side Crystal Palace and his hometown team, Huddersfield Town.

=== Huddersfield Town ===
On 15 August 2008, Huddersfield beat off the competition and signed Denton from Northern Premier League Division One North side Wakefield for a fee of £60,000, possibly totalling up to £100,000.

On 27 November 2008, he joined Conference National side Woking for a month. He made his debut on 2 December, in the Conference League Cup win over Salisbury City, where he scored one and set up two in a 3–0 win. He made his league debut for Woking in their 1–0 defeat at Histon on 6 December. He scored his first goal for Woking in their 1–1 draw with Rushden & Diamonds on 9 December. He returned to Huddersfield Town on 30 January 2009.

On 6 March, Denton rejoined Wakefield on loan until the end of the season and scored 12 goals in 13 games, including four in an 8–1 victory over Salford City.

Denton joined Cheltenham Town on a six-month loan deal during the summer of 2009. He made his Cheltenham debut in the League Cup First Round game against Southend United on 11 August. He made his league debut four days later in the 1–1 draw at Hereford United. He returned to Huddersfield on 10 November, after making four appearances for the club.

On 1 February 2010, he returned to Wakefield on a month's loan deal along with teammate Lewis Nightingale. He made his debut in the 1–1 draw against FC Halifax Town on 6 February. He returned to Huddersfield at the end of the season, but had his contract mutually terminated a year early on 22 June 2010. After leaving Huddersfield, Denton re-signed with Wakefield on 26 June 2010.

On 28 November 2011 Denton joined Northern Premier League Division One North side Mossley.

=== Alfreton Town ===
On 8 August 2012 Denton joined Alfreton Town on a two-year contract. In need of playing time Denton joined Northern Premier League side Worksop Town on 13 September on an initial one-month loan deal and after six goals in five games, his loan was extended for a further two months until 15 December. On 30 November he was recalled from his loan early because of a busy period of games coming up for Alfreton.

=== Worksop Town ===
After just 4 months at the club Denton moved to Worksop Town for an undisclosed fee on 20 December 2012 having failed to secure a regular first team spot at Alfreton.

=== North Ferriby United ===
In July 2014 he signed for North Ferriby United. In March 2015 Denton helped the Villagers to victory in the 2014–15 FA Trophy final at Wembley Stadium although he missed his penalty in the shoot-out.

=== FC Halifax Town ===
In June 2016 Denton moved to National League North team FC Halifax Town from North Ferriby to join his manager Billy Heath from North Ferriby to Halifax. On Saturday 6 August 2016 Denton scored a hattrick on the opening game of the season on his debut in a 3–2 away win over Nuneaton.

=== Chesterfield ===
Denton joined Chesterfield on an 18-month contract for an undisclosed fee from Alfreton Town after a short spell. He left Chesterfield in July 2022 after failing to agree a new contract.

=== Alfreton Town ===
In July 2022, Denton returned to Alfreton Town for a third spell. He found the net twice on the opening day of the 2022–23 campaign as Alfreton came from 2–0 down to draw 2–2 with Chester.

=== Guiseley ===
Denton signed for Northern Premier League club Guiseley in June 2023.

=== Ashton United ===
On 26 June 2024, Denton joined fellow Northern Premier League club Ashton United.

== Honours ==
North Ferriby United

- FA Trophy: 2014–15
