= 2003–04 Huddersfield Town A.F.C. season =

Huddersfield Town
2003–04 season
- Chairman: Ken Davy
- Manager: Peter Jackson
- Stadium: Kirklees Stadium
- Division Three: 4th (promoted via Play-offs)
- Play-offs: Winners
- FA Cup: First round (eliminated by Accrington Stanley)
- League Cup: Third round (eliminated by Reading)
- League Trophy: First round (eliminated by Carlisle United)
- Top goalscorer: League: Jon Stead (16); All: Jon Stead (18)
- Highest home attendance: 19,467 vs Lincoln City (19 May 2004)
- Lowest home attendance: 6,673 vs Derby County (12 August 2003)
- Biggest win: 4–0 vs Macclesfield Town (13 March 2004)
- Biggest defeat: 2–6 vs Scunthorpe United (1 November 2003); 0–4 vs Macclesfield Town (13 December 2003)
Home colours	Away colours

Huddersfield Town's 2003–04 campaign was their first competitive campaign in the bottom division since the 1979–80 season. Huddersfield secured a return to the third tier (to be then called Football League One), at the first attempt, by beating Mansfield Town, on penalties, in the Playoff Final on 31 May 2004 at the Millennium Stadium.

== Squad at the start of the season ==
The squad at the start of the season was mainly depleted. When Peter Jackson took over in late June 2003, there were only 8 players on the official list of registered players, because of the mass clear-out caused by Town going into administration the previous season.

Note: Flags indicate national team as defined under FIFA eligibility rules; some limited exceptions apply. Players may hold more than one non-FIFA nationality.

No.	Pos.	Nation	Player
1	GK	ENG	Ian Gray
2	DF	ENG	Martyn Booty
3	DF	ENG	Rob Edwards (Club captain)
4	MF	WAL	Lee Fowler
5	DF	ENG	Steve Yates
6	DF	WAL	Ian Hughes
7	MF	ENG	Tyrone Thompson
8	MF	ENG	Tony Carss
9	FW	ENG	Jon Stead
10	FW	ENG	Jon Newby
11	MF	ENG	Danny Schofield
12	MF	ENG	Chris Holland
13	GK	ENG	Phil Senior
14	MF	USA	John Thorrington

No.	Pos.	Nation	Player
15	DF	ENG	Nathan Clarke
16	DF	NGA	Efe Sodje (Team captain)
17	DF	ENG	Paul Scott
18	MF	ENG	Jon Worthington
19	MF	IRL	Dwayne Mattis
20	DF	ENG	Nat Brown
21	DF	ENG	Andy Holdsworth
22	FW	ENG	Steven Kenworthy
23	FW	ENG	Andy Booth
24	DF	ENG	Anthony Lloyd
25	DF	ENG	Joe Washington
26	MF	ENG	Adnan Ahmed
27	DF	ENG	David Mirfin
28	DF	ENG	John McCombe

== Review ==
Peter Jackson began his second spell as Huddersfield manager in the summer of 2003 as the Terriers came out of administration under the new ownership of Ken Davy. He again wasted no time in installing Yorath as his assistant. With only eight players turning up to his first training session, and star player Martin Smith defecting to Northampton Town, many supporters would have been happy to see the side consolidate and not slip any further down the league. But some shrewd signings (including Rob Edwards, Tony Carss, Efe Sodje, Steve Yates and goalkeeper Ian Gray), the emergence of a talented group of youngsters, and the prolific form of the previously ineffective Jon Stead made Town among the early pace-setters for the Division. As winter approached, Jackson's young side became more inconsistent and seemed to be fading but a change of formation tightened up the defence. Goalkeeper Paul Rachubka was brought in as the side found a new resilience and the ability to grind out narrow victories. Stead's form saw an offer from Sunderland, that was rejected, but he was snapped up by Premiership Blackburn Rovers for around £1.2 million in January and was replaced by Polish U21 striker Pawel Abbott who had been unable to establish himself at Preston North End.

It took Huddersfield until the end of August to register their first league win of the season in Division 3 (a 2–1 win against Bristol Rovers at the McAlpine Stadium), but they managed to knock out Division 1 side Derby County in the first round of the League Cup and then amazingly beat Sunderland 4–2 in the second round at the Stadium of Light. They then went on a 4-game winning streak, before hitting a bad patch, when they won only one game in 7, including losing in all three cup competitions (1–0 to Reading in the League Cup, 2–0 to Carlisle United in the Football League Trophy & 1–0 to Accrington Stanley in the FA Cup live on BBC One). Then after beating leaders Hull City 3–1, they went on a good run which came to a dramatic halt when they lost 4–0 to Macclesfield Town at Moss Rose. They then went on another good run throughout January 2004, but then they lost their talisman Jon Stead, who was sold to Premier League side Blackburn Rovers for £1.3 million.

With only Andy Booth as a proper striker, Town loaned Preston North End striker Pawel Abbott, who scored 4 goals in his 6 games, they then signed him on a permanent deal for £125,000 and Huddersfield continued their climb up the table and with only 2 games to go, Huddersfield only needed to win one of their last team games to virtually guarantee automatic promotion to Division 2. But on 1 May, they lost their final home game to Mansfield Town 3–1, meaning they had to beat Cheltenham Town at Whaddon Road to ensure automatic promotion ahead of Torquay United. At half-time, all was going well, Huddersfield were 1–0 up thanks to Andy Booth's 100th goal for the club. But then disaster struck when Abbott received the ball just inside his own half and, inexplicably, ran back towards Town's goal and horrendously under hit a backpass that allowed the Robins to equalise with just 15 minutes of the game left. This, together with Torquay's win at Southend United, condemned the Terriers to a Play-Off spot, by virtue of an inferior goal difference.

The play-off semi-final saw Town escape two bruising encounters with Lincoln City with goals from Danny Schofield and Rob Edwards staving off a spirited Lincoln fightback in the second leg, so Town went through 4–3 on aggregate. In the final at Cardiff's Millennium Stadium, Town rode their luck against a Mansfield Town side who had hit three in each league meeting of the sides. Just before the end of normal time the Stags netted but the linesman controversially ruled that the initiating cross had gone out over the by-line. A penalty shoot-out then followed, which Town won 4–1, saw Town home and out of Division Three at the first attempt, securing their place in the newly named Football League One.

== Squad at the end of the season ==
Note: Flags indicate national team as defined under FIFA eligibility rules; some limited exceptions apply. Players may hold more than one non-FIFA nationality.

No.	Pos.	Nation	Player
1	GK	ENG	Ian Gray
2	DF	ENG	Martyn Booty
3	DF	ENG	Rob Edwards (Club captain)
4	MF	WAL	Lee Fowler
5	DF	ENG	Steve Yates
6	DF	WAL	Ian Hughes
8	MF	ENG	Tony Carss
9	FW	POL	Pawel Abbott
10	FW	ENG	Jon Newby
11	MF	ENG	Danny Schofield
13	GK	ENG	Phil Senior
14	FW	SCO	Iffy Onuora
15	DF	ENG	Nathan Clarke
16	DF	NGA	Efe Sodje (Team captain)

No.	Pos.	Nation	Player
17	DF	ENG	Paul Scott
18	MF	ENG	Jon Worthington
20	DF	ENG	Nat Brown
21	DF	ENG	Andy Holdsworth
22	GK	ENG	Lee Martin
23	FW	ENG	Andy Booth
24	DF	ENG	Anthony Lloyd
26	MF	PAK	Adnan Ahmed
27	DF	ENG	David Mirfin
28	DF	ENG	John McCombe
29	GK	ENG	Paul Rachubka (on loan from Charlton Athletic)
30	GK	ENG	Jacob Giles
31	FW	IRL	John McAliskey
32	MF	ENG	Matty Young

== Results ==
=== Pre-season matches ===
Date	Competition	Opponents	Home/ Away	Result F – A	Scorers	Attendance
16 July 2003	Friendly match	Wakefield-Emley	A	2–0	Newby, Booth	1,051
19 July 2003	Friendly match	Halifax Town	A	3–2	Fowler, Newby, Hudson	2,183
23 July 2003	Friendly match	Sunderland	H	2–0	Newby, Stead	5,144
25 July 2003	Friendly match	Sheffield Wednesday	A	2–2	Stead 2	?
26 July 2003	Friendly match	Farsley Celtic	A	2–0	Scott, McAliskey	?
30 July 2003	Friendly match	Guiseley	A	8–0	Booth, Ahmed 2, Worthington, Preston, Schofield, Scott, Kenworthy	?
2 August 2003	Friendly match	Wrexham	A	3–1	Carss, Booth, Stead	1,840
5 August 2003	Friendly match	Ossett Town	A	2–2	Kenworthy, Ahmed	?
September 2003	Friendly match	Sheffield United	A	1–1	Mirfin	?

=== Division Three ===
Date	Opponents	Home/ Away	Result F – A	Scorers	Attendance	League position
9 August 2003	Cambridge United	H	2–2	Stead [30, 59]	10,319	12th
16 August 2003	Boston United	A	2–2	Stead [55], Hughes [60]	3,452	13th
23 August 2003	York City	H	0–1		9,850	17th
25 August 2003	Doncaster Rovers	A	1–1	Booth [7]	7,367	19th
30 August 2003	Bristol Rovers	H	2–1	Edwards [32], Stead [78]	8,486	16th
6 September 2003	Bury	A	1–2	Scott [72]	4,592	18th
13 September 2003	Northampton Town	H	3–0	Stead [17, 35], Carss [33 (pen)]	8,285	12th
16 September 2003	Rochdale	A	1–1	Worthington [23]	4,626	13th
20 September 2003	Swansea City	A	0–2		8,048	17th
27 September 2003	Leyton Orient	H	3–0	Yates [31], Scott [62], Booth [83]	8,942	13th
30 September 2003	Kidderminster Harriers	H	1–0	Stead [12]	8,275	11th
4 October 2003	Southend United	A	2–1	Booth [45], Schofield [89]	4,205	9th
11 October 2003	Torquay United	H	1–0	Carss [80]	9,117	6th
18 October 2003	Lincoln City	A	1–3	Booth [5]	5,718	7th
21 October 2003	Yeovil Town	A	1–2	Stead [42]	5,274	9th
25 October 2003	Carlisle United	H	2–1	Booth [38], Stead [45]	9,059	7th
1 November 2003	Scunthorpe United	A	2–6	Booth [46, 72]	4,715	9th
15 November 2003	Hull City	H	3–1	Stead [32], Booth [41], Schofield [80]	13,893	8th
22 November 2003	Mansfield Town	A	3–3	Schofield [15], Stead [31, 64]	5,828	10th
29 November 2003	Cheltenham Town	H	0–0		8,442	10th
13 December 2003	Macclesfield Town	A	0–4		3,059	10th
20 December 2003	Oxford United	H	1–1	Stead [38]	9,368	10th
26 December 2003	Darlington	A	1–0	Booth [28]	6,205	9th
28 December 2003	Bury	H	1–0	Swailes [31 (og)]	10,217	9th
3 January 2004	Doncaster Rovers	H	3–1	Stead [42, 69], Worthington [82]	13,044	7th
10 January 2004	Cambridge United	A	2–1	Stead [44 (pen)], Worthington [85]	3,667	6th
17 January 2004	Boston United	H	2–0	Sodje [71], Lloyd [86]	9,603	6th
25 January 2004	York City	A	2–0	Schofield [88], Mirfin [89]	6,969	5th
7 February 2004	Darlington	H	0–2		11,014	7th
14 February 2004	Torquay United	A	1–0	Clarke [71]	3,821	6th
17 February 2004	Bristol Rovers	A	1–1	Abbott [86]	6,262	6th
21 February 2004	Lincoln City	H	2–1	Sodje [48], Abbott [67]	11,553	5th
2 March 2004	Yeovil Town	H	3–1	Abbott [40], Schofield [46, 60]	9,395	4th
6 March 2004	Oxford United	A	1–0	Sodje [41]	7,278	4th
9 March 2004	Carlisle United	A	0–1		4,782	4th
13 March 2004	Macclesfield Town	H	4–0	Booth [21], Abbott [47], Sodje [69], McAliskey [90]	9,729	3rd
16 March 2004	Rochdale	H	1–1	Lloyd [49]	10,884	3rd
20 March 2004	Northampton Town	A	0–1			Match abandoned after 39 minutes due to high winds.
27 March 2004	Swansea City	H	3–0	Schofield [51, 85], Lloyd [89]	11,250	3rd
3 April 2004	Leyton Orient	A	1–1	Booth [9]	4,137	3rd
10 April 2004	Southend United	H	1–0	Abbott [30]	10,680	3rd
12 April 2004	Kidderminster Harriers	A	1–2	Sall [84 (og)]	4,051	3rd
17 April 2004	Scunthorpe United	H	3–2	Mirfin [5], McAliskey [87, 90]	12,108	3rd
20 April 2004	Northampton Town	A	1–0	Booth [53]	6,873	3rd
24 April 2004	Hull City	A	0–0		23,495	3rd
1 May 2004	Mansfield Town	H	1–3	McAliskey [14]	18,633	3rd
8 May 2004	Cheltenham Town	A	1–1	Booth [16]	5,814	4th

=== Division 3 Play-offs ===
Date	Round	Opponents	Home/ Away	Result F – A	Scorers	Attendance
15 May 2004	Semi-Final 1st Leg	Lincoln City	A	2–1	Onuora [5], Mirfin [72]	9,202
19 May 2004	Semi-Final 2nd Leg	Lincoln City	H	2–2	Schofield [60 (pen)], Edwards [83]	19,467: Huddersfield won 4–3 on aggregate.

=== Playoff Final ===
31 May 2004
15.00 BST

Huddersfield Town	0–0 (a.e.t.)	Mansfield Town
Penalties
Edwards (penalty scored); Schofield (penalty scored); Carss (penalty scored); Fowler (penalty scored)	4–1	(penalty missed) Corden: Rachubka saved (penalty missed) Lawrence: hit crossbar (penalty scored) MacKenzie

Millennium Stadium, Cardiff
Attendance: 37,298
Referee: Mark Clattenburg (England)

=== FA Cup ===
Date	Round	Opponents	Home/ Away	Result F – A	Scorers	Attendance
9 November 2003	Round 1	Accrington Stanley	A	0–1		3,129

=== Carling Cup ===
Date	Round	Opponents	Home/ Away	Result F – A	Scorers	Attendance
12 August 2003	Round 1	Derby County	H	2–1	Stead [59], Thorrington [70]	6,672
23 September 2003	Round 2	Sunderland	A	4–2	Carss [2], Stead [20], Holdsworth [54], Booth [87]	13,516
28 October 2003	Round 3	Reading	A	0–1		11,892

=== Football League Trophy ===
Date
4 November 2003
Round
Round 1

North

Opponents
Carlisle United
Home/
Away
A
Result
F – A
0–2
Scorers

Attendance
1,346

== Appearances and goals ==
Squad No.	Name	Nationality	Position	League		FA Cup		League Cup		Football League Trophy		Play-offs		Total	
Squad No.	Name	Nationality	Position	Apps	Goals	Apps	Goals	Apps	Goals	Apps	Goals	Apps	Goals	Apps	Goals
1	Ian Gray	England	GK	17	0	1	0	3	0	1	0	0	0	22	0
2	Martyn Booty	England	DF	3 (1)	0	0	0	0	0	0	0	0	0	3 (1)	0
3	Rob Edwards	England	DF	11 (6)	1	0	0	1	0	0	0	2 (1)	1	14 (7)	2
4	Lee Fowler	Wales	MF	27 (2)	0	0	0	3	0	0	0	0 (1)	0	30 (3)	0
5	Steve Yates	England	DF	35	1	0	0	3	0	0	0	3	0	41	1
6	Ian Hughes	Wales	DF	12 (1)	1	0	0	1	0	1	0	0	0	14 (1)	1
7	Tyrone Thompson	England	MF	1 (1)	0	0	0	0	0	0	0	0	0	1 (1)	0
8	Tony Carss	England	MF	35 (1)	2	0	0	3	1	0	0	1	0	39 (1)	3
9	Pawel Abbott	Poland	FW	7	1	0	0	0	0	0	0	1 (1)	0	8 (1)	1
9	Jon Stead	England	FW	26	16	1	0	3	2	1	0	0	0	31	18
10	Jon Newby	England	FW	10 (4)	0	0	0	1	0	0	0	0	0	11 (4)	0
11	Danny Schofield	England	MF	38 (2)	8	1	0	3	0	1	0	3	1	46 (2)	9
12	Gary Harkins	Scotland	MF	1 (2)	0	0	0	0	0	0	0	0	0	1 (2)	0
12	Chris Holland	England	MF	0 (3)	0	1	0	0	0	1	0	0	0	2 (3)	0
13	Phil Senior	England	GK	16	0	0 (1)	0	0	0	0	0	0	0	16 (1)	0
14	Iffy Onuora	Scotland	FW	0 (3)	0	0	0	0	0	0	0	2	1	2 (3)	1
14	John Thorrington	United States	MF	3 (2)	0	0	0	1	1	0	0	0	0	4 (2)	1
15	Nathan Clarke	England	DF	25 (1)	1	1	0	1	0	0	0	0	0	27 (1)	1
16	Efe Sodje	England	DF	37 (2)	4	1	0	2	0	0 (1)	0	3	0	43 (3)	4
17	Paul Scott	England	DF	16 (3)	2	1	0	1	0	1	0	0 (1)	0	19 (4)	2
18	Jon Worthington	England	MF	36 (3)	3	1	0	2	0	1	0	3	0	43 (3)	3
19	Dwayne Mattis	Republic of Ireland	MF	2 (3)	0	0 (1)	0	0	0	0	0	0	0	2 (4)	0
20	Nat Brown	England	DF	13 (8)	0	0 (1)	0	0 (2)	0	0 (1)	0	0	0	13 (12)	0
21	Andy Holdsworth	England	DF	31 (5)	0	1	0	2	1	1	0	3	0	38 (5)	1
23	Andy Booth	England	FW	36 (1)	13	1	0	2	1	1	0	3	0	43 (1)	14
24	Anthony Lloyd	England	DF	30 (1)	3	1	0	0	0	1	0	3	0	35 (1)	3
25	Pawel Abbott	Poland	FW	5 (1)	4	0	0	0	0	0	0	0	0	5 (1)	4
26	Adnan Ahmed	Pakistan	MF	0 (1)	0	0	0	0	0	0	0	0	0	0 (1)	0
27	David Mirfin	England	DF	15 (6)	2	0	0	1	0	1	0	3	1	20 (6)	3
29	Fola Onibuje	Nigeria	FW	0 (2)	0	0	0	0	0	0	0	0	0	0 (2)	0
29	Paul Rachubka	England	GK	13	0	0	0	0	0	0	0	3	0	16	0
31	John McAliskey	Republic of Ireland	FW	5 (3)	4	0	0	0	0	0	0	0 (2)	0	5 (5)	4
