= 2004–05 Huddersfield Town A.F.C. season =

Huddersfield Town
2004–05 season
- Chairman: Ken Davy
- Manager: Peter Jackson
- Stadium: Kirklees Stadium
- League One: 9th
- FA Cup: First round (eliminated by Stockport County)
- League Cup: First round (eliminated by Leeds United)
- League Trophy: Second round (eliminated by Blackpool)
- Top goalscorer: League: Pawel Abbott (26); All: Pawel Abbott (27)
- Highest home attendance: 17,292 vs Sheffield Wednesday (29 March 2005)
- Lowest home attendance: 3,831 vs Morecambe (28 September 2004)
- Biggest win: 4–0 vs Hull City (5 September 2004); 4–0 vs Swindon Town (30 April 2005)
- Biggest defeat: 3–6 vs Blackpool (2 November 2004); 0–3 vs Tranmere Rovers (22 February 2005)
Home colours	Away colours

Huddersfield Town's 2004–05 campaign was their first competitive campaign in the restructured Coca-Cola League One. They finished 9th with 70 points, just one point less than Hartlepool United in 6th, the lowest playoff position.

== Squad at the start of the season ==
Note: Flags indicate national team as defined under FIFA eligibility rules; some limited exceptions apply. Players may hold more than one non-FIFA nationality.

No.	Pos.	Nation	Player
1	GK	ENG	Ian Gray
2	DF	ENG	Andy Holdsworth
3	DF	ENG	Anthony Lloyd
4	MF	WAL	Lee Fowler
5	DF	ENG	Steve Yates
6	DF	ENG	Nathan Clarke
7	MF	ENG	Chris Brandon
8	MF	ENG	Tony Carss
9	FW	POL	Pawel Abbott
10	FW	MSR	Junior Mendes
11	MF	ENG	Danny Schofield

No.	Pos.	Nation	Player
14	DF	ENG	Rob Edwards (Club captain)
16	DF	NGA	Efe Sodje (Team captain)
17	DF	ENG	David Mirfin
18	MF	ENG	Jon Worthington
19	FW	NGA	Akpo Sodje
20	FW	IRL	John McAliskey
22	GK	ENG	Phil Senior
23	FW	ENG	Andy Booth
24	DF	ENG	John McCombe
25	MF	PAK	Adnan Ahmed
27	DF	ENG	Nat Brown

== Review ==
Town beat Stockport County on the opening day, but then failed to score in their next 4 games, including a 1–0 defeat to Leeds United in the first round of the League Cup at Elland Road. The season included victories away at eventual champions Luton Town and at home over runners-up Hull City but also included two derby defeats against Bradford City. However, a disastrous mid-season spell of form (including seven successive away league defeats and having Efe Sodje stripped of the captaincy after his red card against Blackpool in the Football League Trophy) saw the side slump and in real danger of a relegation battle.

Jon Worthington was made captain after the Blackpool game, but then Huddersfield gained a recovery in form with the loan signing of Luke Beckett from Sheffield United, but he was then recalled by Sheffield in mid-February.

The team were in deep trouble in mid-March, with relegation being a big possibility, but the play-offs were still possible, although Town had to win all their final 10 games to have a realistic chance of reaching the play-offs and all was going well, until Town played Colchester United at the Galpharm Stadium. With 1 minute to go, Town were leading 2–1, but then a goalkeeping error by Paul Rachubka (signed earlier in the season from Charlton Athletic) let Colchester equalise the game. That proved to be fatal, Town did win all the other 9 games and they missed out on the play-offs by one point.

During the season, many graduates from Town's own academy started to cement first-team places, such as Andy Holdsworth, David Mirfin, Nathan Clarke, Tom Clarke, Adnan Ahmed and Michael Collins. Beckett departed to join local rivals Oldham Athletic before the transfer deadline.

== Squad at the end of the season ==
Note: Flags indicate national team as defined under FIFA eligibility rules; some limited exceptions apply. Players may hold more than one non-FIFA nationality.

No.	Pos.	Nation	Player
2	DF	ENG	Andy Holdsworth
3	DF	ENG	Anthony Lloyd
4	MF	WAL	Lee Fowler
5	DF	ENG	Steve Yates
6	DF	ENG	Nathan Clarke
7	MF	ENG	Chris Brandon
8	MF	ENG	Tony Carss
9	FW	POL	Pawel Abbott
10	FW	MSR	Junior Mendes
11	MF	ENG	Danny Schofield
14	DF	ENG	Rob Edwards (Club captain)
17	DF	ENG	David Mirfin

No.	Pos.	Nation	Player
18	MF	ENG	Jon Worthington (Team captain)
20	FW	IRL	John McAliskey
21	DF	ENG	Danny Adams
22	GK	ENG	Phil Senior
23	FW	ENG	Andy Booth
24	DF	ENG	John McCombe
25	MF	PAK	Adnan Ahmed
26	GK	ENG	Paul Rachubka
27	DF	ENG	Nat Brown
29	MF	IRL	Michael Collins
36	DF	ENG	Tom Clarke

== Final league table ==
Pos	Team	Pld	W	D	L	GF	GA	GD	Pts
7	Bristol City	46	18	16	12	74	57	+17	70
8	Bournemouth	46	20	10	16	77	64	+13	70
9	Huddersfield Town	46	20	10	16	74	65	+9	70
10	Doncaster Rovers	46	16	18	12	65	60	+5	66
11	Bradford City	46	17	14	15	64	62	+2	65

Updated to match(es) played on May 2005. Source: Soccerbase
Rules for classification: 1) points; 2) goal difference; 3) number of goals scored.

== Results ==
=== Pre-season matches ===
Date	Competition	Opponents	Home/ Away	Result F - A	Scorers	Attendance
12 July 2004	Friendly match	Wakefield-Emley	A	2 - 1	Mirfin, Holdsworth	1,589
17 July 2004	Friendly match	Middlesbrough	A	1 - 2	Booth	?
19 July 2004	Friendly match	Ossett Town	A	2 - 0	A. Sodje, McCombe	1,000+
21 July 2004	Friendly match	Bradford Park Avenue	A	2 - 1	McAliskey, Carss	800+
24 July 2004	Friendly match	Harrogate Town	A	2 - 2	Abbott (pen), Brandon	704
27 July 2004	Friendly match	Rotherham United	A	2 - 0	2 og	1,720
28 July 2004	Friendly match	Farsley Celtic	A	1 - 1	A. Sodje	?
31 July 2004	Friendly match	Macclesfield Town	A	1 - 0	Brandon	?
3 August 2004	Friendly match	Guiseley	A	2 - 0	Brown, Fowler	c. 500

=== Coca-Cola League One ===
Date	Opponents	Home/ Away	Result F - A	Scorers	Attendance	League position
7 August 2004	Stockport County	A	3 - 2	Carss [45], Booth [87], Abbott [90]	7,473	4th
10 August 2004	Chesterfield	H	0 - 0		11,942	6th
16 August 2004	Hartlepool United	H	0 - 2		9,968	14th
21 August 2004	Sheffield Wednesday	A	0 - 1		26,264	17th
28 August 2004	Peterborough United	H	2 - 1	McAliskey [16], Worthington [48]	9,531	14th
30 August 2004	Doncaster Rovers	A	1 - 2	Worthington [83]	7,068	16th
5 September 2004	Hull City	H	4 - 0	Abbott [7], Edwards [14], Brandon [74], Booth [87]	13,542	11th
11 September 2004	Port Vale	A	3 - 0	Abbott [62, 67, 65]	6,298	5th
18 September 2004	Barnsley	H	0 - 2		14,794	9th
25 September 2004	Bristol City	A	3 - 3	Schofield [28], Abbott [35], Brandon [60]	10,783	10th
2 October 2004	Walsall	H	3 - 1	Abbott, [29, 68], Mendes [30]	11,324	7th
9 October 2004	Torquay United	A	1 - 2	Mendes [39]	3,033	9th
16 October 2004	Luton Town	A	2 - 1	Mendes [14, 36]	8,192	7th
19 October 2004	Tranmere Rovers	H	1 - 3	Abbott [33]	10,324	8th
23 October 2004	Milton Keynes Dons	H	3 - 0	Abbott [33, 45 (pen)], Mendes [45]	10,709	7th
30 October 2004	Blackpool	A	1 - 1	Booth [15]	7,676	8th
7 November 2004	Brentford	H	1 - 1	Abbott [71]	10,810	9th
20 November 2004	Colchester United	A	0 - 0		3,972	11th
27 November 2004	Wrexham	H	1 - 2	Schofield [41]	11,127	14th
8 December 2004	Swindon Town	A	2 - 1	Abbott [19], Brandon [34]	4,828	10th
11 December 2004	Oldham Athletic	A	1 - 2	Abbott [7]	8,389	11th
18 December 2004	Bradford City	H	0 - 1		17,281	13th
26 December 2004	Port Vale	H	2 - 1	Schofield [4], Abbott [8]	12,243	12th
28 December 2004	AFC Bournemouth	A	2 - 2	McAliskey [38], Mirfin [60]	8,448	12th
1 January 2005	Hull City	A	1 - 2	Brandon [40]	22,291	13th
3 January 2005	Bristol City	H	2 - 2	Orr [18 (og)], Abbott [58]	11,151	13th
8 January 2005	Torquay United	H	1 - 1	E Sodje [24]	9,194	13th
15 January 2005	Barnsley	A	2 - 4	Abbott [55 (pen)], Booth [70]	11,725	14th
22 January 2005	AFC Bournemouth	H	3 - 2	Abbott [8 (pen)], Beckett [35, 45]	9,754	13th
29 January 2005	Walsall	A	3 - 4	Booth [7], Beckett [11, 33]	5,727	14th
5 February 2005	Luton Town	H	1 - 1	Beckett [90]	12,611	14th
12 February 2005	Milton Keynes Dons	A	1 - 2	Booth [30]	4,793	15th
19 February 2005	Blackpool	H	1 - 0	Beckett [2]	10,614	14th
22 February 2005	Tranmere Rovers	A	0 - 3		7,613	14th
26 February 2005	Oldham Athletic	H	2 - 1	Abbott [4, 29]	11,161	13th
5 March 2005	Bradford City	A	0 - 2		15,417	14th
12 March 2005	Chesterfield	A	1 - 2	Mirfin [79]	4,827	15th
19 March 2005	Stockport County	H	5 - 3	Booth [4], Abbott [51], Mirfin [82], Ahmed [83], Dolan [90 (og)]	11,180	14th
25 March 2005	Hartlepool United	A	1 - 0	Booth [42]	6,205	13th
29 March 2005	Sheffield Wednesday	H	1 - 0	Worthington [7]	17,292	13th
2 April 2005	Peterborough United	A	2 - 1	Brandon [21], Schofield [84]	3,976	12th
9 April 2005	Doncaster Rovers	H	3 - 1	Abbott [1], Booth [43], Brandon [56]	12,792	8th
16 April 2005	Colchester United	H	2 - 2	Abbott [20], Schofield [62]	10,831	9th
23 April 2005	Brentford	A	1 - 0	Abbott [26]	7,703	10th
30 April 2005	Swindon Town	H	4 - 0	Abbott [62, 80], Booth [79], Edwards [85]	13,559	9th
7 May 2005	Wrexham	A	1 - 0	Mirfin [43]	7,151	9th

=== FA Cup ===
Date	Round	Opponents	Home/ Away	Result F - A	Scorers	Attendance
13 November 2004	Round 1	Stockport County	A	1 - 3	Abbott [90]	3,479

=== League Cup ===
Date	Round	Opponents	Home/ Away	Result F - A	Scorers	Attendance
24 August 2004	Round 1	Leeds United	A	0 - 1		30,115

=== Football League Trophy ===
Date	Round	Opponents	Home/ Away	Result F - A	Scorers	Attendance
28 September 2004	Round 1 North	Morecambe	H	3 - 0	Mirfin [47], Mendes [84 (pen)], Fowler [90]	3,831
2 November 2004	Round 2 North	Blackpool	A	3 - 6 (aet, 90 mins: 2 - 2)	McAliskey [47], Schofield [53], Ahmed [105]	3,533

== Appearances and goals ==
Squad No.	Name	Nationality	Position	League		FA Cup		League Cup		Football League Trophy		Total	
Squad No.	Name	Nationality	Position	Apps	Goals	Apps	Goals	Apps	Goals	Apps	Goals	Apps	Goals
1	Ian Gray	England	GK	12	0	0	0	1	0	0	0	13	0
2	Andy Holdsworth	England	DF	38 (2)	0	1	0	1	0	1	0	41 (2)	0
3	Anthony Lloyd	England	DF	10 (1)	0	1	0	0	0	2	0	13 (1)	0
4	Lee Fowler	Wales	MF	8 (12)	0	0 (1)	0	0	0	2	1	10 (13)	1
5	Steve Yates	England	DF	15 (2)	0	1	0	0	0	1	0	17 (2)	0
6	Nathan Clarke	England	DF	37	0	1	0	1	0	1	0	40	0
7	Chris Brandon	England	MF	42 (2)	6	1	0	1	0	0	0	44 (2)	6
8	Tony Carss	England	MF	23 (4)	1	0	0	1	0	1	0	25 (4)	1
9	Pawel Abbott	Poland	FW	36 (8)	26	1	1	1	0	0 (1)	0	38 (9)	25
10	Junior Mendes	Montserrat	FW	13 (12)	5	1	0	0 (1)	0	1	1	15 (13)	6
11	Danny Schofield	England	MF	21 (12)	5	1	0	0	0	2	1	24 (12)	6
12	Luke Beckett	England	FW	7	6	0	0	0	0	0	0	7	6
12	Delroy Facey	Grenada	FW	4	0	0	0	0	0	0	0	4	0
14	Rob Edwards	England	DF	21 (3)	2	0	0	1	0	0	0	22 (3)	2
16	Efe Sodje	England	DF	24 (4)	1	0	0	1	0	1	0	26 (4)	1
17	David Mirfin	England	DF	38 (3)	4	1	0	1	0	1	1	41 (3)	5
18	Jon Worthington	England	MF	39	3	1	0	1	0	1	0	42	3
19	Akpo Sodje	Nigeria	FW	1 (6)	0	0	0	0	0	1 (1)	0	2 (7)	0
20	John McAliskey	Republic of Ireland	FW	7 (11)	2	0	0	0 (1)	0	1 (1)	1	8 (13)	3
21	Danny Adams	England	DF	5	0	0	0	0	0	0	0	5	0
22	Phil Senior	England	GK	5 (1)	0	0	0	0	0	2	0	7 (1)	0
23	Andy Booth	England	FW	25 (4)	10	0	0	1	0	1	0	27 (4)	10
24	John McCombe	England	DF	4 (1)	0	0	0	0	0	2	0	6 (1)	0
25	Adnan Ahmed	Pakistan	MF	16 (2)	1	0	0	0	0	0 (2)	1	18 (4)	2
26	Paul Rachubka	England	GK	29	0	1	0	0	0	0	0	30	0
27	Nat Brown	England	DF	7 (10)	0	0	0	0	0	1	0	8 (10)	0
29	Michael Collins	Republic of Ireland	MF	7 (1)	0	0	0	0	0	0	0	7 (1)	0
36	Tom Clarke	England	DF	12	0	0	0	0	0	0	0	12	0
