= Jon Worthington =

English football manager (born 1983)

Personal information
- Full name: Jonathan Alan Spencer Worthington
- Date of birth: 16 April 1983 (age 43)
- Place of birth: Dewsbury, England
- Height: 5 ft 8 in (1.73 m)
- Position: Midfielder

Youth career
- 1992–2002: Huddersfield Town

Senior career*
Years	Team	Apps	(Gls)
2002–2009	Huddersfield Town	213	(12)
2009	→ Yeovil Town (loan)	9	(0)
2009–2011	Oldham Athletic	16	(0)
2010–2011	→ Fleetwood Town (loan)	3	(0)
2011	→ Bradford City (loan)	1	(0)
2011	Bradford City	15	(0)
2011	Mansfield Town	17	(0)
2012–2014	FC Halifax Town	35	(7)
Total		309	(19)

Managerial career
- 2024: Huddersfield Town (caretaker)
- 2025: Huddersfield Town (interim)
- * Club domestic league appearances and goals

Jonathan Alan Spencer Worthington (born 16 April 1983) is an English professional football coach and former player who was recently interim manager of EFL League One club Huddersfield Town.

Worthington previously played in the Football League for Huddersfield Town, Yeovil Town, Oldham Athletic and Bradford City and in the Conference for Fleetwood Town, Mansfield Town and FC Halifax Town. After retiring, Worthington worked as a physiotherapist at Halifax Town, before rejoining Huddersfield. Initially a physio in the club's academy, he subsequently became a youth team coach for the club.

== Playing career ==
=== Huddersfield Town ===
Born in nearby Dewsbury, Worthington began playing for Huddersfield Town at the age of nine, eventually moving through the club's youth academy and into the first team. He primarily plays as a hard tackling central midfielder. Many Terriers fans regarded Worthington as being the main lynchpin of the Town midfield. Other midfielders have attempted to fill that role such as Michael Collins, Andy Holdsworth, Adnan Ahmed, Mark Hudson and loan signing Ronnie Wallwork, but fans felt that the Town midfield four was incomplete without Worthington in the middle.

He was made captain in 2004 after previous captain Efe Sodje was stripped of the captaincy after being sent off in a Football League Trophy match against Blackpool which Town lost 6–3 in extra time. He was given the captaincy over Nathan Clarke who was named vice-captain.

Worthington picked up 16 yellow cards in the 2005–06 season. Another other low point was that through injury he missed Huddersfield Town's high-profile FA Cup tie against Chelsea at Stamford Bridge in 2008.

Following Andy Ritchie's departure as manager of the Terriers in 2008, Worthington was relieved of his captaincy duties by caretaker manager Gerry Murphy, so he could focus on his playing duties. The captaincy was taken up by Rob Page.

=== Yeovil Town ===
After being out of new manager Lee Clark's plans, Worthington moved on loan to Yeovil Town on 30 January 2009. He made his debut the following day in the 1–0 win over Leyton Orient at Brisbane Road. His loan was extended by another month on 3 March, following impressive displays under new player-manager Terry Skiverton. He was recalled on 26 March. However, it was revealed on 17 April, that manager Lee Clark did not see Worthington in his future plans and said he was not going to offer him a new contract.

=== Oldham Athletic ===
On 26 May 2009, he joined Oldham Athletic, becoming Dave Penney's second new signing after Rob Purdie.

In July 2010 he was transfer-listed by the club, along with five other first team players. He joined Fleetwood Town on loan on 18 November 2010 returning on 2 January 2011. On 25 January 2011, he joined Bradford City on a one-month emergency loan deal. He was recalled by Oldham after one match and released by the club on 27 January 2011 allowing him to seek another club before the closure of the winter transfer window. . He then signed for Bradford on a permanent basis, signing a four-month contract.

=== Mansfield Town ===
In June 2011, it was announced that Worthington had joined Conference Premier side Mansfield Town on a one-year deal

=== FC Halifax Town ===
In July 2012, he joined FC Halifax Town on a one-year deal. Worthington was played in a more attacking role at Halifax than he had been used to previously in his career, but he had great success including two goals against Abbey Hey in the FA Cup in a 6–0 victory. Worthington also bagged a goal from the edge of the box on Boxing Day 2012 against Gainsborough Trinity. In January 2013, Worthington suffered an injury against Solihull Moors after going in for a challenge which won The Shaymen a penalty. He made his return against Droylsden in February and scored a goal in the 6–0 victory over The Bloods.

== Coaching career ==
In the summer of 2014, Worthington was appointed as player-physiotherapist at FC Halifax Town.

After retiring from playing at the end of the 2014–15 season, Worthington returned to Huddersfield Town as academy physio. Having spent four years as a physio in the Huddersfield academy, in June 2019 Worthington was appointed the club's new under-17 coach. The following year, Worthington was promoted to under-19 coach. In January 2021, he took on the additional role of B Team coach.

On 9 March 2025, Worthington was appointed interim head coach for the remainder of the season following the sacking of Michael Duff.

== Personal life ==
Worthington studied at the University of Salford for a degree in physiotherapy, graduating in 2015.

== Career statistics ==
Appearances and goals by club, season and competition
Club	Season	League			FA Cup		League Cup		Other		Total	
Club	Season	Division	Apps	Goals	Apps	Goals	Apps	Goals	Apps	Goals	Apps	Goals
Huddersfield Town	2002–03	Second Division	22	0	1	0	0	0	0	0	23	0
Huddersfield Town	2003–04	Third Division	39	3	1	0	2	0	4 (Note: One appearance in Football League Trophy, three appearances in Third Division play-offs)	0	46	3
Huddersfield Town	2004–05	League One	39	3	1	0	1	0	1 (Note: Appearance in Football League Trophy)	0	42	3
Huddersfield Town	2005–06	League One	41	4	2	0	1	0	3 (Note: One appearance in Football League Trophy, two appearances and one goal in League One play-offs)	1	47	5
Huddersfield Town	2006–07	League One	28	2	1	0	0	0	1	0	30	2
Huddersfield Town	2007–08	League One	25	0	1	0	1	0	0	0	27	0
Huddersfield Town	2008–09	League One	19	0	0	0	2	1	1	0	22	1
Huddersfield Town	Total		213	12	7	0	7	1	10	1	237	14
Yeovil Town (loan)	2008–09	League One	9	0	—		—		—		9	0
Oldham Athletic	2009–10	League One	16	0	0	0	1	0	0	0	17	0
Oldham Athletic	2010–11	League One	0	0	0	0	0	0	0	0	0	0
Oldham Athletic	Total		16	0	0	0	1	0	0	0	17	0
Fleetwood Town (loan)	2010–11	Conference Premier	3	0	—		—		—		3	0
Bradford City	2010–11 (Note: Worthington made one appearance for Bradford City on loan from Oldham Athletic before signing permanently in the January transfer window.)	League Two	16	0	—		—		—		16	0
Mansfield Town	2011–12	Conference Premier	17	0	0	0	—		0	0	17	0
FC Halifax Town	2012–13	Conference North	25	6	5	3	—		4 (Note: Three appearances in FA Trophy, one in Conference North play-offs)	0	34	9
FC Halifax Town	2013–14	Conference Premier	10	1	1	0	—		1 (Note: Appearance in FA Trophy)	0	12	1
FC Halifax Town	2014–15	Conference Premier	0	0	0	0	—		1 (Note: Appearance in West Riding County Cup)	0	1	0
FC Halifax Town	Total		35	7	6	3	—		6	0	48	10
Career total			309	19	13	3	8	1	16	1	346	24

== Honours ==
Huddersfield Town

- Football League Third Division play-offs: 2004
