= Pawel Abbott =

Polish footballer (born 1982)

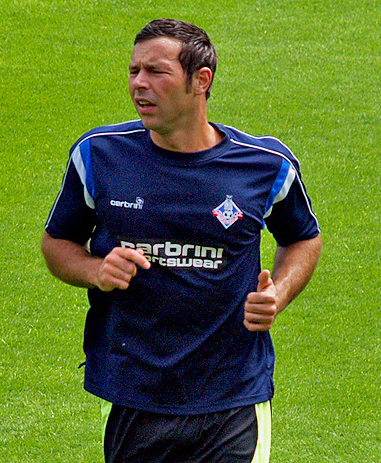
- Abbott training with Oldham Athletic in 2009

Personal information
- Full name: Pawel Tadeusz Howard Abbott
- Date of birth: 5 May 1982 (age 44)
- Place of birth: York, North Yorkshire, England
- Height: 6 ft 1 in (1.85 m)
- Position: Striker

Youth career
- Beagle Boys
- Kujawiak Włocławek
- Włocłavia Włocławek
- Łokietek Brześć Kujawski

Senior career*
Years	Team	Apps	(Gls)
1999–2001	ŁKS Łódź	8	(0)
2001–2004	Preston North End	25	(5)
2002	→ Bury (loan)	13	(5)
2003	→ Bury (loan)	4	(1)
2004	→ Huddersfield Town (loan)	6	(4)
2004–2007	Huddersfield Town	105	(44)
2007	Swansea City	18	(1)
2007–2009	Darlington	42	(17)
2009–2010	Oldham Athletic	39	(13)
2010–2011	Charlton Athletic	17	(1)
2011–2012	Ruch Chorzów	36	(6)
2012–2014	Zawisza Bydgoszcz	31	(15)
2014–2017	Arka Gdynia	51	(14)
2017–2018	Stomil Olsztyn	10	(0)
Total		405	(126)

International career
	Poland U21	1	(1)
- * Club domestic league appearances and goals

Pawel Tadeusz Howard Abbott (born 5 May 1982) is a former professional footballer who played as a striker. Born in England, he represented Poland at under-21 level.

== Club career ==
=== Early career ===
Abbott was born in York, North Yorkshire, to a Polish mother and an English father as the younger of two children. He first played football for Beagle Boys in York before the team changed its name to York RI. He had the chance to play for Doncaster Rovers but declined the offer and moved to Poland, where he became a youth player at ŁKS Łódź, before moving back to England to join Preston North End at the age of 19.

He did not have the best time at Preston making only 25 appearances in three years and having two loan spells at Bury.

=== Huddersfield Town ===
In early 2004, Abbott was signed on loan by Huddersfield Town as a makeshift replacement for Jon Stead who had just been sold to Premier League side Blackburn Rovers. He scored on his debut after coming off the bench against Bristol Rovers, going on to score four times in six games on loan. He was then bought for a fee of around £125,000. He would score only once more that season, but in 2004–05 became the first Town striker in six years to hit more than 20 goals as he struck 27 times in all competitions.

The following season was less successful for Abbott. After an initial run of scoring in the season, including in six consecutive games in August and September, he suffered something of a goal-drought over the remainder of the campaign, being relegated to being a bit-part player from the bench following this loss of form. He scored a total of 14 times in 2005–06.

In July 2006, Abbott rejected a move to Milton Keynes Dons as part of a deal or no deal with their defender Dean Lewington. He said that he wanted to fight for a first-team place against Gary Taylor-Fletcher, Andy Booth, John McAliskey and new signing Luke Beckett. In his penultimate game for Huddersfield on 30 December 2006 he scored two goals (including a last minute winner) against the club he would ironically go on to join in a matter of days; Swansea City. In his final game for Huddersfield he was sent off against Doncaster Rovers on 1 January 2007.

=== Swansea City ===
In January 2007, Abbott was sold to Swansea City for £150,000. He made his debut as a late substitute against Gillingham on 23 January 2007. Abbott was signed by Kenny Jackett, however shortly after he joined the club Jackett was replaced by Roberto Martínez. After 18 league appearances (9 starts) for the Swans he scored just once against Rotherham United, which was Martínez's first game in charge.

=== Darlington ===
After just six months with Swansea, Abbott joined Darlington for £100,000. Here Abbott found some of his best form scoring 17 from in 31 appearances. However, he was prone to injuries during his two seasons there and was sold to Oldham Athletic.

=== Oldham Athletic ===
On 26 June 2009, Abbott signed for League One team Oldham Athletic on a two-year deal. He scored his first two goals for the club on 15 August 2009, wrapping up a 2–1 victory for Oldham against Leyton Orient. Abbott finished the season as Oldham's top scorer with 13 goals.

=== Charlton Athletic ===
On 30 July 2010, Abbott signed for Charlton Athletic for a fee of £20,000. Abbott netted twice against Shrewsbury Town in the League Cup to register his first goals for the club. He went on to score against MK Dons in the Football League Trophy and Swindon in the league, ending his season tally on four goals.

=== Ruch Chorzów ===
On 28 February 2011, Abbott joined Polish side Ruch Chorzów on a free transfer, after playing 25 matches for Charlton scoring four goals.

On 30 July 2011, he scored his first goal for Ruch Chorzów, giving his team a 2–1 victory over GKS Bełchatów on the first day match of the 2011–12 season.

== International career ==
Abbott was eligible to represent both England and Poland at International level, and chose to represent Poland due to his mother. He made one appearance for the Poland national under-21 team, where he also scored his first international goal.

== Career statistics ==
As of match played 19 July 2018.

Appearances and goals by club, season and competition
Club	Season	League			National cup		League cup		Other		Total	
Club	Season	Division	Apps	Goals	Apps	Goals	Apps	Goals	Apps	Goals	Apps	Goals
ŁKS Łódź	1999–2000	Ekstraklasa	8	0	1	1	2	0	—		11	1
ŁKS Łódź	2000–01	II liga	0	0	1	0	0	0	—		1	0
ŁKS Łódź	Total		8	0	2	1	2	0	—		12	1
Preston North End	2000–01	First Division	0	0	0	0	0	0	0	0	0	0
Preston North End	2002–03	First Division	16	3	1	0	0	0	—		17	3
Preston North End	2003–04	First Division	9	2	3	0	1	0	—		13	2
Preston North End	Total		25	5	4	0	1	0	0	0	30	5
Bury (loan)	2002–03	Third Division	17	6	0	0	2	0	1 (Note: Appearance(s) in Football League Trophy)	0	20	6
Huddersfield Town (loan)	2003–04	Third Division	6	4	0	0	0	0	0	0	6	4
Huddersfield Town	2003–04	Third Division	7	1	0	0	0	0	2 (Note: Appearances in Third Division play-offs)	0	9	1
Huddersfield Town	2004–05	League One	44	26	1	1	1	0	1	0	47	27
Huddersfield Town	2005–06	League One	36	12	3	0	2	2	3 (Note: One appearance in Football League Trophy, two in League One play-offs)	0	44	14
Huddersfield Town	2006–07	League One	18	5	0	0	1	0	1	0	20	5
Huddersfield Town	Total		111	48	4	1	4	2	7	0	126	51
Swansea City	2006–07	League One	18	1	1	0	0	0	0	0	19	1
Darlington	2007–08	League Two	24	9	2	0	1	0	0	0	27	9
Darlington	2008–09	League Two	18	8	0	0	0	0	0	0	18	8
Darlington	Total		42	17	2	0	1	0	0	0	45	17
Oldham Athletic	2009–10	League One	39	13	0	0	1	0	1	0	41	13
Charlton Athletic	2010–11	League One	17	1	3	0	1	2	4	1	25	4
Ruch Chorzów	2010–11	Ekstraklasa	7	0	1	0	—		—		8	0
Ruch Chorzów	2011–12	Ekstraklasa	29	6	7	3	—		—		36	9
Ruch Chorzów	Total		36	6	8	3	—		—		44	9
Zawisza Bydgoszcz	2012–13	I liga	27	15	2	0	—		—		29	15
Zawisza Bydgoszcz	2013–14	Ekstraklasa	4	0	1	1	—		—		5	1
Zawisza Bydgoszcz	Total		31	15	3	1	—		—		34	16
Arka Gdynia	2014–15	I liga	15	2	1	0	—		—		16	2
Arka Gdynia	2015–16	I liga	25	12	2	0	—		—		27	12
Arka Gdynia	2016–17	Ekstraklasa	11	0	3	2	—		—		14	2
Arka Gdynia	Total		51	14	5	2	—		—		57	16
Stomil Olsztyn	2017–18	I liga	10	0	0	0	—		—		10	0
Career total			405	126	33	8	12	4	13	1	463	139

== Honours ==
Huddersfield Town

- Football League Third Division play-offs: 2004

Zawisza Bydgoszcz

- I liga: 2012–13
- Polish Cup: 2013–14

Arka Gdynia

- I liga: 2015–16
- Polish Cup: 2016–17
