= David Mirfin =

English footballer (born 1985)

Personal information
- Full name: David Matthew Mirfin
- Date of birth: 18 April 1985 (age 41)
- Place of birth: Sheffield, England
- Height: 6 ft 2 in (1.88 m)
- Position: Centre back

Youth career
- –2003: Huddersfield Town

Senior career*
Years	Team	Apps	(Gls)
2003–2008	Huddersfield Town	161	(9)
2008–2011	Scunthorpe United	93	(4)
2011–2012	Watford	4	(0)
2012	→ Scunthorpe United (loan)	19	(1)
2012–2017	Scunthorpe United	144	(6)
2015	→ Hartlepool United (loan)	15	(0)
2017–2019	Mansfield Town	12	(1)
2019	→ York City (loan)	7	(0)
Total		455	(21)
- * Club domestic league appearances and goals

David Matthew Mirfin (born 18 April 1985) is an English retired professional footballer who played as a centre back.

== Career ==
=== Huddersfield Town ===
Mirfin was born in Sheffield, South Yorkshire. He graduated from the Huddersfield Town Academy in the 2003–04 season and made an immediate impression, helping the team keep 16 clean sheets out of the 25 matches he appeared in that season and also scoring three goals as an emergency striker.

On 5 May 2007, Mirfin was voted the Player's Player of the Year, the Away Supporters' Top Performer and the Fans' Player of the Year. He also collected the Young Terriers Award and the Huddersfield Examiner Majority Man of the Match for the whole season.

During the 2007–08 season, Mirfin's chances seemed to be limited following a poor defensive partnership between him and Nathan Clarke, but following the arrival of Rob Page and the departure of manager Andy Ritchie, Mirfin found himself in a three-man central defence partnership with Page and Clarke, which after five matches kept four clean sheets.

=== Scunthorpe United and Watford ===
Mirfin signed for Huddersfield's League One rivals Scunthorpe United on 11 August 2008 on a three-year contract for a transfer fee of £150,000 plus add ons and a 25% sell-on clause. He made his debut on 16 August in a 2–1 away defeat to Walsall, but his debut lasted just 10 minutes, after he was sent off for a foul on Jabo Ibehre. His first goal for Scunthorpe came on 4 November in the Football League Trophy with a header in stoppage time in a 1–0 home over Rochdale, which put Scunthorpe into the northern area semi-final. Mirfin was released by the club at the end of the 2010–11 season when his contract expired.

Mirfin signed for Championship club Watford on 5 July 2011 on a two-year contract on a free transfer. He made his debut on 23 August in a 1–1 draw away to Bristol Rovers in the League Cup, with Watford losing 4–2 in the resulting penalty shoot-out.

=== Return to Scunthorpe United ===
Mirfin rejoined Scunthorpe United, now in League One, on 31 January 2012 on loan until the end of the 2011–12 season, playing 19 matches. He was released from his Watford contract by mutual consent on 31 July 2012 to re-sign for Scunthorpe permanently on a two-year contract.

Mirfin joined League Two club Hartlepool United on 2 February 2015 on a one-month loan.

=== Mansfield Town ===
Mirfin signed for League Two club Mansfield Town on 23 May 2017 on a contract of undisclosed length on a free transfer. He scored on his debut on 5 August in a 2–2 draw away to Crewe Alexandra with a shot at the far post from Joel Byrom's free kick.

Mirfin joined National League North club York City on 1 February 2019 on loan until the end of the 2018–19 season. He made his debut the following day, starting in a 3–2 win away to Alfreton Town in the league.

In May 2019 it was confirmed, that Mirfin had decided to retire.

== Career statistics ==
Appearances and goals by club, season and competition
Club	Season	League			FA Cup		League Cup		Other		Total	
Club	Season	Division	Apps	Goals	Apps	Goals	Apps	Goals	Apps	Goals	Apps	Goals
Huddersfield Town	2002–03	Second Division	1	0	0	0	0	0	0	0	1	0
Huddersfield Town	2003–04	Third Division	21	2	0	0	1	0	4 (Note: One appearance in Football League Trophy, three appearances and one goal in Third Division play-offs)	1	26	3
Huddersfield Town	2004–05	League One	41	4	1	0	1	0	1 (Note: Appearance in Football League Trophy)	1	44	5
Huddersfield Town	2005–06	League One	31	1	3	0	0	0	1	1	35	2
Huddersfield Town	2006–07	League One	38	1	0	0	1	0	0	0	39	1
Huddersfield Town	2007–08	League One	29	1	4	0	1	0	0	0	34	1
Huddersfield Town	Total		161	9	8	0	4	0	6	2	179	11
Scunthorpe United	2008–09	League One	33	0	2	0	0	0	9 (Note: Six appearances and one goal in Football League Trophy, three appearances in League One play-offs)	1	44	1
Scunthorpe United	2009–10	Championship	37	1	2	0	3	0	—		42	1
Scunthorpe United	2010–11	Championship	23	3	1	0	1	0	—		25	3
Scunthorpe United	Total		93	4	5	0	4	0	9	1	111	5
Watford	2011–12	Championship	4	0	0	0	1	0	—		5	0
Scunthorpe United (loan)	2011–12	League One	19	1	—		—		—		19	1
Scunthorpe United	2012–13	League One	30	0	1	0	2	0	1	0	34	0
Scunthorpe United	2013–14	League Two	45	2	2	0	1	0	1	0	49	2
Scunthorpe United	2014–15	League One	0	0	0	0	0	0	0	0	0	0
Scunthorpe United	2015–16	League One	35	2	2	0	1	0	0	0	38	2
Scunthorpe United	2016–17	League One	34	2	0	0	1	0	2 (Note: Appearances in League One play-offs)	0	37	2
Scunthorpe United	Total		163	7	5	0	5	0	4	0	177	7
Hartlepool United (loan)	2014–15	League Two	15	0	—		—		—		15	0
Mansfield Town	2017–18	League Two	12	1	0	0	1	0	1 (Note: Appearance in EFL Trophy)	0	14	1
Mansfield Town	2018–19	League Two	0	0	0	0	0	0	0	0	0	0
Mansfield Town	Total		12	1	0	0	1	0	1	0	14	1
York City (loan)	2018–19	National League North	7	0	—		—		—		7	0
Career total			455	21	18	0	15	0	20	3	508	24

== Honours ==
Huddersfield Town

- Football League Third Division play-offs: 2004

Scunthorpe United

- Football League One play-offs: 2009
- Football League Two second-place promotion: 2013–14
- Football League Trophy runner-up: 2008–09
