= John McCombe =

English footballer

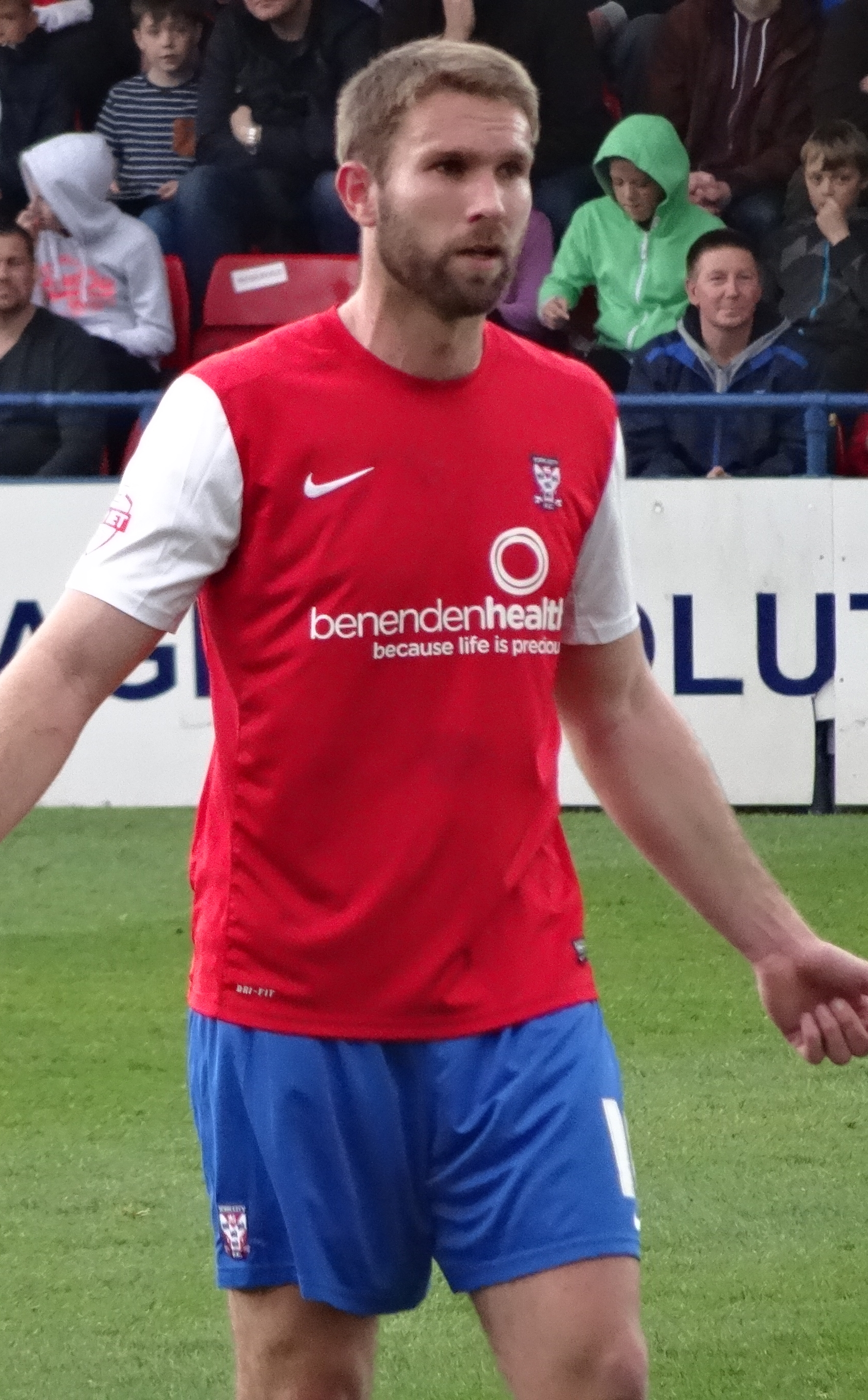
- McCombe playing for York City in 2014

Personal information
- Full name: John Paul McCombe
- Date of birth: 7 May 1985 (age 41)
- Place of birth: Pontefract, England
- Height: 6 ft 2 in (1.88 m)
- Position: Centre back

Youth career
- –2003: Huddersfield Town

Senior career*
Years	Team	Apps	(Gls)
2003–2007	Huddersfield Town	14	(0)
2006	→ Torquay United (loan)	0	(0)
2007–2008	Hereford United	27	(0)
2008–2013	Port Vale	185	(14)
2013–2014	Mansfield Town	5	(2)
2014–2016	York City	55	(4)
2016–2017	Macclesfield Town	48	(2)
2017–2018	Chester	23	(0)
2018	Harrogate Town	14	(1)
2018	Boston United	0	(0)
2018–2021	Hyde United	51	(8)
Total		422	(31)
- * Club domestic league appearances and goals

John Paul McCombe (born 7 May 1985) is an English former professional footballer who played as a centre back. He made 473 league and cup appearances in a 19-year professional and semi-professional career, scoring 29 goals. His brother, Jamie, also played professional football.

McCombe graduated through the Huddersfield Town Academy to make his first-team debut in May 2003. Unused in 2003–04, he rarely featured in 2004–05, 2005–06, and 2006–07. During this time, he had brief periods on loan at Torquay United, though he never took to the field for them. He spent the 2007–08 season with Hereford United, helping the club to win promotion into League One. McCombe joined Port Vale in May 2008, and after establishing himself in the first-team in 2008–09 and 2009–10, he managed to win the club's Player of the Year Award in 2011. He helped the club to secure promotion out of League Two in 2012–13.

After leaving Port Vale in May 2013, McCombe signed for Mansfield Town on a free transfer. He left Mansfield for York City in January 2014, and stayed with York for two years. He joined Macclesfield Town in February 2016 and played in the club's defeat at the 2017 FA Trophy final. He signed for Chester in June 2017 before moving to Harrogate Town in February 2018, who he helped to win promotion out of the National League North via the play-offs three months later. He signed with Boston United in June 2018, but left the club two months later without making a first-team appearance and moved on to Hyde United.

== Early and personal life ==
Born in Pontefract, West Yorkshire, McCombe grew up in South Elmsall in the City of Wakefield. His father fixed factory sewing machines in Leeds and his mother was head cook in a local nursing home. His elder brother Jamie is also a former professional footballer. McCombe attended Manchester Metropolitan University, studying for a sports science qualification. He is a Sheffield Wednesday fan. In 2014, he co-founded Pro Player Football Academy with David McGurk. In 2020, he and his brother founded JPM Logistics, a company they sold two years later, before starting McCombe & Co Financial Planning in West Yorkshire.

== Career ==
=== Huddersfield Town ===
McCombe joined Huddersfield Town as a trainee. He was converted from playing as a centre forward to become a centre back. He made his first-team debut on 3 May 2003, coming onto the pitch as a late substitute for Jon Stead in a 1–1 draw with Oldham Athletic at Kirklees Stadium. Unused in the 2003–04 season, he had to wait until September 2004 for his next first-team appearance. He made seven appearances in 2004–05.

McCombe's only appearances of 2005–06 were against Blackburn Rovers in the League Cup – where he only played because of injuries and suspensions, against Boston United in the Football League Trophy – when manager Peter Jackson rested all his first-team players, and on the last match of the season against Swindon Town. In between these appearances he spent February on loan at Torquay United, but did not appear for John Cornforth's struggling team.

On 15 March 2007, he, along with Hartlepool United's Michael Proctor, agreed to join Boston United on loan. However, due to Boston's financial state, Boston chairman Jim Rodwell was unable to sanction the deals. Huddersfield released him in May 2007, and two months later he signed for Hereford United, ending his eleven-year association with the club.

=== Hereford United ===
He began 2007–08 as third-choice centre-back, but an injury to Dean Beckwith gave McCombe his chance. He turned in a number of impressive performances, preserving Hereford's unbeaten record and scoring his first professional goal from a Kris Taylor cross in a 2–0 FA Cup victory against Hartlepool United. McCombe made 27 league appearances as Hereford gained promotion from League Two, but was dropped for the run-in, in favour of Karl Broadhurst. This coincided with McCombe's mistake in a key fixture against Chester City when he conceded a penalty kick in the last minute for handball, which enabled Chester to draw the match 2–2. He made only one more appearance for the club, as a second-half substitute on the final day of the season. In May 2008, manager and chairman Graham Turner confirmed that out-of-contract McCombe would not be offered a new deal.

=== Port Vale ===
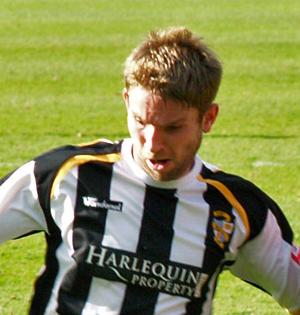
McCombe playing for Port Vale in 2009

On 29 May 2008, McCombe agreed a two-year contract to join Port Vale. He claimed one of the reasons he put pen to paper was that having met manager Lee Sinnott 13 years previously, he knew that Sinnott could help improve his game. His performances in the 2008–09 season earned him the chairman's Player of the Year award, as well as the nickname 'Boom Boom McCombe' from fans.

Retaining his first-team place in 2009–10, he was transfer listed in late September 2009, along with the entire Port Vale squad, after manager Micky Adams saw his team slip to a third consecutive defeat. However, by the end of October 2009 he had played in the opening 18 matches of the season, picking up a goal on the way, and was confident of earning a new contract by the season's end. On 12 December 2009, he received the first sending off of his career, following a professional foul on Northampton Town's Adebayo Akinfenwa. This brought to an end his run of 29 consecutive starts, and kept him out of the team for the next six weeks, as manager Micky Adams switched his tactics during McCombe's absence, moving from a 3–5–2 to 4–4–2 formation. He was offered a new two-year contract by the club at the end of the season, which he quickly signed.

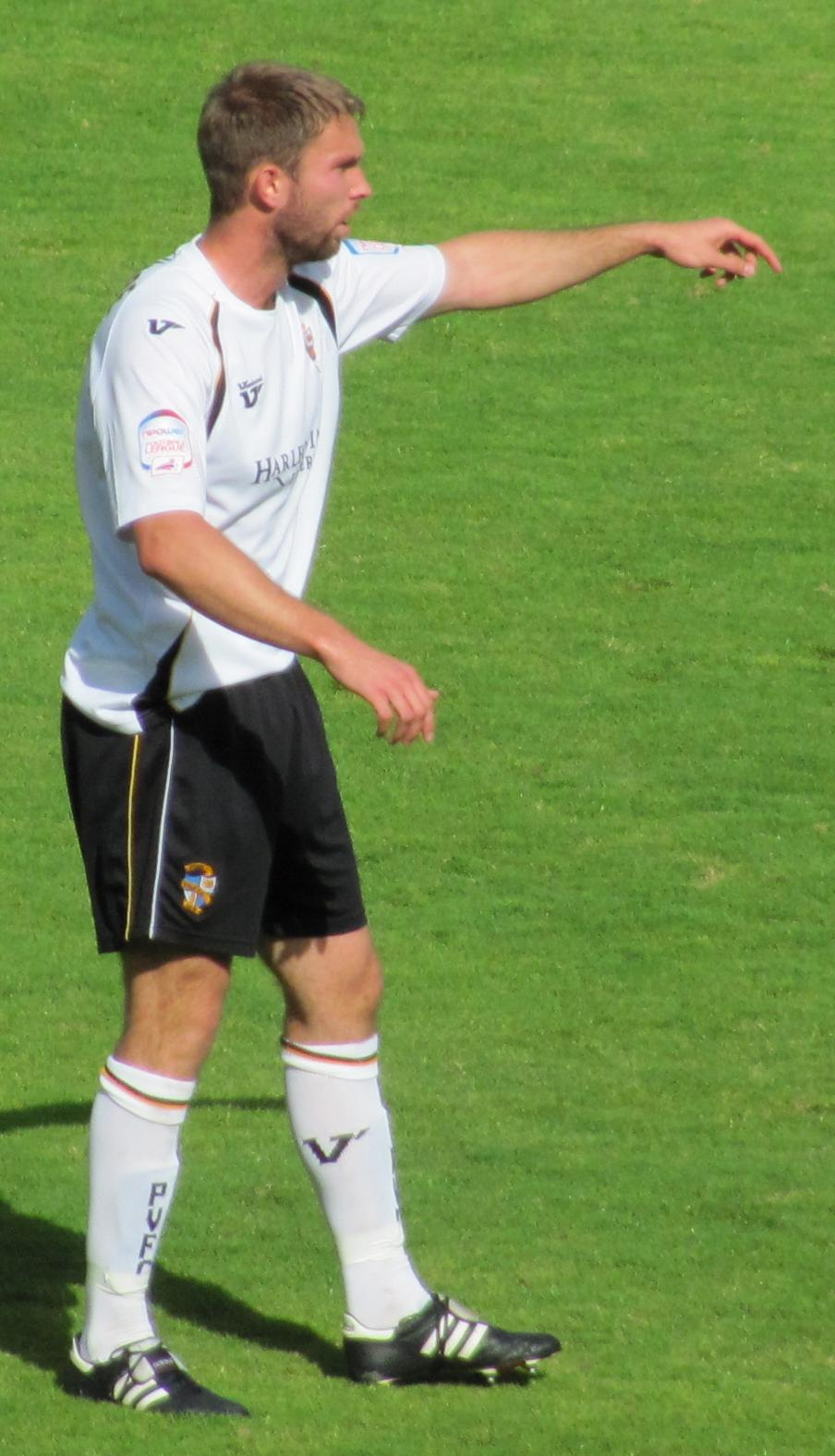
McCombe playing for Port Vale in 2010

He started 2010–11 in fine form, and his strong performances in November 2010 saw him nominated for the League Two Player of the Month award. His strong performances continued throughout the season, and he was rewarded with the club's Player of the Year award.

Adams continued to use McCombe in the heart of the Vale defence at the start of 2011–12, however, he dropped him from the first-team after 11 matches in favour of loan signing Liam Chilvers. He marked his return to the first-team on 14 October 2011 with the second goal of a 3–0 win over Northampton Town. However, he was dropped after the next match, a 4–0 defeat at home to Morecambe, only to win back his first-team place the following month after turning down the chance to leave the club on loan. With the loanees back at their parent clubs, Gareth Owen out injured and Clayton McDonald in court, McCombe helped to guide teenage centre-back Joe Davis through the final stages of the season. He agreed to sign a new two-year deal with the club in June 2012.

He formed a solid centre-back partnership with Clayton McDonald at the start of 2012–13. On 25 August, he scored in a 3–1 win over Morecambe at the Globe Arena, earning himself a place on the League Two Team of the Week. On 27 October, he was sent off for the second time in his career, again against Northampton at Sixfields, as he put in a late challenge on midfielder Alex Nicholls, who managed to score the opening goal of the match just before McCombe made his challenge; it was later confirmed that the tackle had broken Nicholls's leg. Opposition manager Aidy Boothroyd accepted McCombe's apology, and Northampton player Akinfenwa also stated that McCombe was "not a malicious character". McCombe himself picked up an injury on 1 January 2013, damaging knee ligaments in a defeat to Fleetwood Town, and was ruled out of action for several weeks. Vale secured promotion with a third-place finish at the end of the season, with McCombe playing 37 matches in a regularly changing four back. Despite still being under contract, he chose to leave the club in the summer.

=== Mansfield Town and York City ===
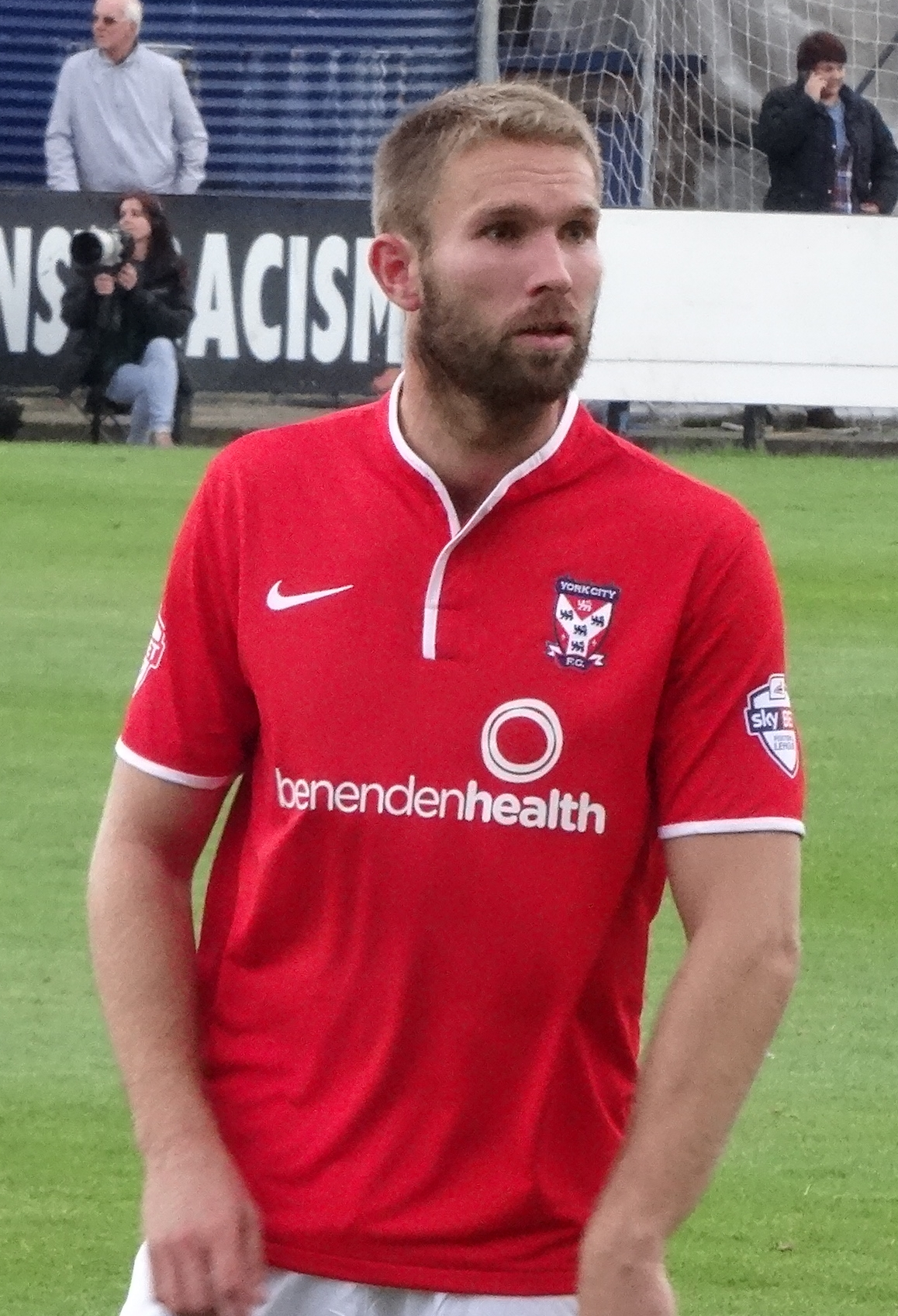
McCombe playing for York City in 2014

McCombe signed for Mansfield Town on 1 June 2013, and was described by manager Paul Cox as "a commanding player who will add knowledge and experience to our defence". He left Field Mill by mutual consent in January 2014, having made only seven starts for Mansfield in 2013–14.

McCombe signed for League Two club York City on 12 January 2014 on a two-and-a-half-year contract after his release from Mansfield. He made his debut as an 85th-minute substitute for Ryan Jarvis in a 2–0 away defeat to Hartlepool United on 25 January 2014. On 15 February 2014, he scored a brace and claimed an assist in a 4–0 victory at Plymouth Argyle, earning himself a mention on the Football League Team of the Week. He was again named in the Team of the Week after making a block on the line from a Hallam Hope shot in a 1–0 win over Bury on 21 April 2014. On 1 February 2016, McCombe left Bootham Crescent by mutual consent after not playing a match three months into new manager Jackie McNamara's tenure.

=== Later career ===
On 1 March 2016, McCombe joined National League club Macclesfield Town on a contract running until the end of 2015–16. He debuted later that day, as an 81st-minute substitute in a 2–1 home defeat to Torquay. He made 12 appearances and scored one goal as Macclesfield finished in 10th-place in the 2015–16 National League. He retained his first-team place for the following season, and scored the winning goal as Macclesfield won 1–0 away to League One team Walsall in the first round of the FA Cup. He made 44 appearances in 2016–17, including in the 2017 FA Trophy final at Wembley Stadium, where Macclesfield were beaten 3–2 by York City.

McCombe rejected a new contract offer from Macclesfield to join their National League rivals Chester on 6 June 2017 on a one-year contract. He left the club on 8 February 2018 and signed for National League North club Harrogate Town the following day. Harrogate finished second at the end of the 2017–18 season, and went on to secure promotion after beating Brackley Town 3–0 in the play-off final. Having made 16 appearances and scored one goal, McCombe was released by Harrogate at the end of 2017–18.

He signed a one-year contract with the National League North club Boston United on 8 June 2018. He had his contract cancelled by mutual consent on 10 August without making a competitive appearance for Boston. He joined newly promoted Northern Premier League Premier Division club Hyde United four days later. He made 43 appearances in the 2018–19 season, scoring seven goals, as the "Tigers" posted a tenth-place finish. He was appointed as player-assistant manager in May 2019. The 2019–20 season was formally abandoned on 26 March, with all results from the season being expunged, due to the COVID-19 pandemic in England. The 2020–21 season was also curtailed early due to the pandemic.

== Style of play ==
He was a centre-back who often scored goals from set pieces.

== Career statistics ==
Appearances and goals by club, season and competition
Club	Season	League			FA Cup		League Cup		Other		Total	
Club	Season	Division	Apps	Goals	Apps	Goals	Apps	Goals	Apps	Goals	Apps	Goals
Huddersfield Town	2002–03	Second Division	1	0	0	0	0	0	0	0	1	0
Huddersfield Town	2003–04	Third Division	0	0	0	0	0	0	0	0	0	0
Huddersfield Town	2004–05	League One	5	0	0	0	0	0	2 (Note: Appearance(s) in Football League Trophy)	0	7	0
Huddersfield Town	2005–06	League One	1	0	0	0	1	0	1	0	3	0
Huddersfield Town	2006–07	League One	7	0	1	0	0	0	1	0	9	0
Huddersfield Town	Total		14	0	1	0	1	0	4	0	20	0
Torquay United (loan)	2005–06	League Two	0	0	—		0	0	0	0	0	0
Hereford United	2007–08	League Two	27	0	4	1	0	0	1	0	32	1
Port Vale	2008–09	League Two	31	2	1	0	1	0	1	0	34	2
Port Vale	2009–10	League Two	40	3	3	0	3	0	2	1	48	4
Port Vale	2010–11	League Two	42	4	4	1	2	0	0	0	48	5
Port Vale	2011–12	League Two	40	4	2	0	1	0	1	0	44	4
Port Vale	2012–13	League Two	32	1	1	0	1	0	3	0	37	1
Port Vale	Total		185	14	11	1	8	0	7	1	211	16
Mansfield Town	2013–14	League Two	5	2	1	0	1	0	0	0	7	2
York City	2013–14	League Two	19	3	—		—		2 (Note: Appearance(s) in League Two play-offs)	0	21	3
York City	2014–15	League Two	31	0	1	0	1	0	1	0	34	0
York City	2015–16	League Two	5	1	0	0	0	0	1	0	6	1
York City	Total		55	4	1	0	1	0	4	0	61	4
Macclesfield Town	2015–16	National League	12	1	0	0	—		0	0	12	1
Macclesfield Town	2016–17	National League	36	1	4	1	—		4 (Note: Appearance(s) in FA Trophy)	0	44	2
Macclesfield Town	Total		48	2	4	1	—		4	0	56	3
Chester	2017–18	National League	23	0	1	0	—		0	0	24	0
Harrogate Town	2017–18	National League North	14	1	—		—		2 (Note: Appearance(s) in National League North play-offs)	0	16	1
Boston United	2018–19	National League North	0	0	—		—		—		0	0
Hyde United	2018–19	NPL Premier Division	36	7	1	0	3	0	3 (Note: Two appearances in FA Trophy, one appearance in Cheshire Senior Cup)	0	43	7
Hyde United	2019–20	NPL Premier Division	15	1	1	0	1	0	2 (Note: Appearance(s) in Cheshire Senior Cup)	0	19	1
Hyde United	2020–21	NPL Premier Division	0	0	0	0	0	0	1	0	1	0
Hyde United	Total		51	8	2	0	4	0	6	0	63	8
Career total			422	31	25	3	15	0	28	1	490	35

== Honours ==
Hereford United

- Football League Two third-place promotion: 2007–08

Port Vale

- Football League Two third-place promotion: 2012–13

Macclesfield Town

- FA Trophy runner-up: 2016–17

Harrogate Town

- National League North play-offs: 2018

Individual

- Port Vale Player of the Year: 2010–11
