= 2002–03 Huddersfield Town A.F.C. season =

Huddersfield Town
2002–03 season
- Chairman: David Taylor
- Manager: Mick Wadsworth (until 26 March 2003); Mel Machin (from 27 March 2003)
- Stadium: Kirklees Stadium
- Division Two: 22nd (relegated)
- FA Cup: First round (eliminated by Swindon Town)
- League Cup: Second round (eliminated by Burnley)
- League Trophy: First round (eliminated by Wrexham)
- Top goalscorer: League: Martin Smith (17); All: Martin Smith (17)
- Highest home attendance: 13,769 vs Wigan Athletic (19 April 2003)
- Lowest home attendance: 3,810 vs Darlington (10 September 2002)
- Biggest win: 4–0 vs Chesterfield (5 April 2003)
- Biggest defeat: 0–4 vs Oldham Athletic (28 September 2002); 0–4 vs Cardiff City (29 December 2003); 1–5 vs Port Vale (26 April 2003)
| Home colours | Away colours |

Huddersfield Town's 2002–03 campaign saw them relegated to the bottom division for the first time since the 1979–80 season. Huddersfield endured a dreadful season under Mick Wadsworth. That season saw Wadsworth sacked twice, but on the first attempt of him being sacked, he was re-hired because the club could not pay him off. Mel Machin took over for the last month of the season, but could not stop the Terriers relegating to the Football League Third Division. Town's main worry during the season was administration, which nearly saw the club liquidated.

== Squad at the start of the season ==
Note: Flags indicate national team as defined under FIFA eligibility rules; some limited exceptions apply. Players may hold more than one non-FIFA nationality.

| No. | Pos. | Nation | Player |
|---|---|---|---|
| 1 | GK | ENG | Scott Bevan (on loan from Southampton) |
| 2 | DF | WAL | Steve Jenkins |
| 4 | DF | ENG | Nathan Clarke |
| 5 | DF | ENG | Adie Moses |
| 6 | MF | ENG | Chris Holland |
| 7 | MF | ENG | Danny Schofield |
| 8 | MF | ENG | Kenny Irons |
| 9 | FW | ENG | Andy Booth |
| 10 | MF | USA | John Thorrington |
| 11 | MF | ENG | Simon Baldry |
| 14 | FW | ENG | Jon Stead |

| No. | Pos. | Nation | Player |
|---|---|---|---|
| 15 | FW | AUS | Scott McDonald (on loan from Southampton) |
| 17 | DF | ENG | Eddie Youds |
| 19 | FW | ENG | Martin Smith |
| 20 | DF | IRL | Thomas Heary |
| 22 | DF | CAN | Kevin Sharp |
| 23 | DF | ENG | Jon Dyson |
| 27 | DF | ENG | Nat Brown |
| 28 | DF | ENG | Paul Scott |
| 29 | MF | ENG | Jon Worthington |
| 31 | FW | ENG | Paul Macari |
| 33 | MF | IRL | Dwayne Mattis |

== Review ==
Mick Wadsworth was appointed manager of the Terriers during the close season with many people predicting Town would have as good a season as the previous season, which saw them lose in the play-offs to Brentford, but Wadsworth's new 4-3-3 formation wasn't pleasing fans and players alike. During the early part of the season, Town had a run of scoring 1 goal in 6 matches. The only highlight of the early part of the season was taking Division 1 Burnley to extra time in the second round of the Worthington Cup, before losing 1–0.

Christmas and New Year also bore little joy to the Terriers and went on a run of 5 losses from 6, before a mini revival which saw them unbeaten in 5 matches, before another dip which saw them lose another 5 in 6. That saw Wadsworth lose his job in late March, which then saw Mel Machin take over as caretaker manager and after managing to draw with eventual champions Wigan Athletic, many thought that Town might survive, but bad consecutive losses to Stockport County and Port Vale saw Town go down.

== Squad at the end of the season ==
Note: Flags indicate national team as defined under FIFA eligibility rules; some limited exceptions apply. Players may hold more than one non-FIFA nationality.

| No. | Pos. | Nation | Player |
|---|---|---|---|
| 4 | DF | ENG | Nathan Clarke |
| 5 | DF | ENG | Adie Moses |
| 6 | MF | ENG | Chris Holland |
| 7 | MF | ENG | Danny Schofield |
| 8 | MF | ENG | Kenny Irons |
| 9 | FW | ENG | Andy Booth |
| 10 | MF | USA | John Thorrington |
| 11 | MF | ENG | Simon Baldry |
| 12 | FW | PER | Gianfranco Labarthe Tome |
| 14 | FW | ENG | Jon Stead |
| 15 | DF | IRL | Jason Gavin (on loan from Middlesbrough) |
| 17 | DF | ENG | Eddie Youds |
| 19 | FW | ENG | Martin Smith |

| No. | Pos. | Nation | Player |
|---|---|---|---|
| 20 | DF | IRL | Thomas Heary |
| 22 | DF | CAN | Kevin Sharp |
| 23 | DF | ENG | Jon Dyson |
| 27 | DF | ENG | Nat Brown |
| 28 | DF | ENG | Paul Scott |
| 29 | MF | ENG | Jon Worthington |
| 31 | FW | ENG | Paul Macari |
| 33 | MF | IRL | Dwayne Mattis |
| 35 | GK | ENG | Phil Senior |
| 37 | DF | ENG | John McCombe |
| 38 | DF | ENG | David Mirfin |
| 40 | GK | ENG | Andrew Jeffery |

== Results ==
=== Division Two ===
| Date | Opponents | Home/ Away | Result F - A | Scorers | Attendance | League position |
|---|---|---|---|---|---|---|
| 10 August 2002 | Brentford | H | 0 - 2 | | 9,635 | 23rd |
| 13 August 2002 | Plymouth Argyle | A | 1 - 2 | Thorrington [89] | 8,953 | 21st |
| 17 August 2002 | Peterborough United | A | 1 - 0 | Mattis [10] | 5,205 | 19th |
| 24 August 2002 | Crewe Alexandra | H | 1 - 1 | Booth [26] | 8,467 | 18th |
| 26 August 2002 | Tranmere Rovers | A | 1 - 2 | McDonald [44] | 7,534 | 19th |
| 31 August 2002 | Blackpool | H | 0 - 0 | | 9,506 | 20th |
| 7 September 2002 | Barnsley | H | 1 - 0 | Smith [59] | 11,989 | 17th |
| 14 September 2002 | Northampton Town | A | 0 - 0 | | 4,679 | 17th |
| 17 September 2002 | Queens Park Rangers | A | 0 - 3 | | 11,010 | 18th |
| 21 September 2002 | Luton Town | H | 0 - 1 | | 9,249 | 21st |
| 28 September 2002 | Oldham Athletic | A | 0 - 4 | | 7,643 | 23rd |
| 5 October 2002 | Port Vale | H | 2 - 2 | Smith [12], Baldry [17] | 9,091 | 22nd |
| 12 October 2002 | Notts County | H | 3 - 0 | Stead [15, 73], Moses [25] | 9,984 | 19th |
| 19 October 2002 | Mansfield Town | A | 2 - 0 | Smith [53, 61] | 4,998 | 17th |
| 26 October 2002 | Colchester United | H | 1 - 1 | Stead [90] | 8,924 | 16th |
| 29 October 2002 | Bristol City | A | 0 - 1 | | 11,494 | 17th |
| 2 November 2002 | Cheltenham Town | A | 0 - 1 | | 4,322 | 19th |
| 9 November 2002 | Wycombe Wanderers | H | 0 - 0 | | 8,695 | 20th |
| 23 November 2002 | Swindon Town | H | 2 - 3 | Smith [36], Stead [90] | 8,334 | 22nd |
| 30 November 2002 | Chesterfield | A | 0 - 1 | | 4,194 | 23rd |
| 14 December 2002 | Stockport County | H | 2 - 1 | Smith [27, 83] | 7,978 | 22nd |
| 21 December 2002 | Wigan Athletic | A | 0 - 1 | | 6,013 | 23rd |
| 26 December 2002 | Tranmere Rovers | H | 1 - 2 | Smith [78] | 11,002 | 24th |
| 29 December 2002 | Cardiff City | A | 0 - 4 | | 13,703 | 24th |
| 1 January 2003 | Blackpool | A | 1 - 1 | Booth [75] | 7,184 | 24th |
| 11 January 2003 | Peterborough United | H | 0 - 1 | | 9,022 | 24th |
| 18 January 2003 | Crewe Alexandra | A | 0 - 1 | | 5,819 | 24th |
| 25 January 2003 | Cardiff City | H | 1 - 0 | Booth [80] | 9,462 | 23rd |
| 4 February 2003 | Plymouth Argyle | H | 1 - 0 | Smith [82 (pen)] | 7,294 | 24th |
| 8 February 2003 | Wycombe Wanderers | A | 0 - 0 | | 5,886 | 23rd |
| 15 February 2003 | Cheltenham Town | H | 3 - 3 | Irons [54], Smith [56, 59] | 9,309 | 23rd |
| 22 February 2003 | Barnsley | A | 1 - 0 | Booth [26] | 12,474 | 21st |
| 25 February 2003 | Brentford | A | 0 - 1 | | 4,366 | 21st |
| 1 March 2003 | Northampton Town | H | 2 - 0 | Baldry [44], Smith [45] | 9,661 | 19th |
| 4 March 2003 | Queens Park Rangers | H | 0 - 3 | | 8,695 | 20th |
| 8 March 2003 | Luton Town | A | 0 - 3 | | 6,122 | 21st |
| 15 March 2003 | Colchester United | A | 0 - 2 | | 3,835 | 23rd |
| 18 March 2003 | Mansfield Town | H | 1 - 1 | Smith [51] | 8,756 | 24th |
| 22 March 2003 | Bristol City | H | 1 - 2 | Smith [20 (pen)] | 9,467 | 24th |
| 29 March 2003 | Notts County | A | 2 - 3 | Booth [19], Schofield [37] | 5,872 | 24th |
| 5 April 2003 | Chesterfield | H | 4 - 0 | Smith [17, 53], Stead [23, 66] | 9,098 | 22nd |
| 12 April 2003 | Swindon Town | A | 1 - 0 | Smith [87] | 4,760 | 22nd |
| 19 April 2003 | Wigan Athletic | H | 0 - 0 | | 13,769 | 22nd |
| 21 April 2003 | Stockport County | A | 1 - 2 | Booth [3] | 7,159 | 22nd |
| 26 April 2003 | Port Vale | A | 1 - 5 | Gavin [45] | 5,925 | 22nd |
| 3 May 2003 | Oldham Athletic | H | 1 - 1 | Schofield [26] | 11,271 | 22nd |

=== FA Cup ===
| Date | Round | Opponents | Home/ Away | Result F - A | Scorers | Attendance |
|---|---|---|---|---|---|---|
| 16 November 2002 | Round 1 | Swindon Town | A | 0 - 1 | | 4,210 |

=== Worthington Cup ===
| Date | Round | Opponents | Home/ Away | Result F - A | Scorers | Attendance |
|---|---|---|---|---|---|---|
| 10 September 2002 | Round 1 | Darlington | H | 2 - 0 | Baldry [3], Clarke [16 (og)] | 3,810 |
| 1 October 2002 | Round 2 | Burnley | H | 0 - 1 (aet, 90 mins: 0 - 0) | | 5,887 |

=== LDV Vans Trophy ===
| Date | Round | Opponents | Home/ Away | Result F - A | Scorers | Attendance |
|---|---|---|---|---|---|---|
| 22 October 2002 | Round 1 | Wrexham | A | 1 - 2 | Mattis [77] | 1,350 |

== Appearances and goals ==
| Squad No. | Name | Nationality | Position | League | | FA Cup | | League Cup | | Football League Trophy | | Total | |
| Squad No. | Name | Nationality | Position | Apps | Goals | Apps | Goals | Apps | Goals | Apps | Goals | Apps | Goals |
|---|---|---|---|---|---|---|---|---|---|---|---|---|---|
| 1 | Scott Bevan | England | GK | 30 | 0 | 1 | 0 | 2 | 0 | 1 | 0 | 34 | 0 |
| 2 | Steve Jenkins | Wales | DF | 26 | 0 | 1 | 0 | 2 | 0 | 0 | 0 | 29 | 0 |
| 4 | Nathan Clarke | England | DF | 2 (1) | 0 | 0 | 0 | 0 | 0 | 0 | 0 | 2 (1) | 0 |
| 5 | Adie Moses | England | DF | 40 | 1 | 1 | 0 | 1 | 0 | 1 | 0 | 43 | 1 |
| 6 | Chris Holland | England | MF | 33 (1) | 0 | 1 | 0 | 2 | 0 | 1 | 0 | 37 (1) | 0 |
| 7 | Danny Schofield | England | MF | 25 (5) | 2 | 1 | 0 | 2 | 0 | 0 (1) | 0 | 28 (6) | 2 |
| 8 | Kenny Irons | England | MF | 29 (6) | 1 | 0 | 0 | 1 | 0 | 0 (1) | 0 | 30 (7) | 1 |
| 9 | Andy Booth | England | FW | 32 (1) | 6 | 0 | 0 | 0 | 0 | 0 | 0 | 32 (1) | 6 |
| 10 | John Thorrington | United States | MF | 16 (15) | 1 | 0 (1) | 0 | 0 (1) | 0 | 1 | 0 | 17 (17) | 1 |
| 11 | Simon Baldry | England | MF | 14 (8) | 2 | 0 | 0 | 2 | 1 | 1 | 0 | 17 (8) | 3 |
| 12 | Kevin Gallacher | Scotland | FW | 5 (2) | 0 | 0 | 0 | 1 | 0 | 0 | 0 | 6 (2) | 0 |
| 12 | Gianfranco Labarthe Tome | Peru | FW | 0 (3) | 0 | 0 | 0 | 0 | 0 | 0 | 0 | 0 (3) | 0 |
| 13 | Lee Ashcroft | England | FW | 4 | 0 | 0 | 0 | 0 | 0 | 0 | 0 | 4 | 0 |
| 14 | Jon Stead | England | FW | 28 (14) | 6 | 1 | 0 | 2 | 0 | 1 | 0 | 32 (14) | 6 |
| 15 | Jason Gavin | Republic of Ireland | DF | 10 | 1 | 0 | 0 | 0 | 0 | 0 | 0 | 10 | 1 |
| 15 | Scott McDonald | Australia | FW | 7 (6) | 1 | 0 | 0 | 0 (1) | 0 | 0 | 0 | 7 (7) | 1 |
| 17 | Eddie Youds | England | DF | 25 | 0 | 0 | 0 | 0 | 0 | 0 | 0 | 25 | 0 |
| 19 | Martin Smith | England | FW | 35 (3) | 17 | 1 | 0 | 1 (1) | 0 | 1 | 0 | 38 (4) | 17 |
| 20 | Thomas Heary | Republic of Ireland | DF | 14 (6) | 0 | 0 | 0 | 0 | 0 | 1 | 0 | 15 (6) | 0 |
| 22 | Kevin Sharp | Canada | DF | 38 (1) | 0 | 1 | 0 | 2 | 0 | 1 | 0 | 42 (1) | 0 |
| 23 | Jon Dyson | England | DF | 2 (1) | 0 | 0 | 0 | 2 | 0 | 0 | 0 | 4 (1) | 0 |
| 27 | Nat Brown | England | DF | 36 (2) | 0 | 1 | 0 | 1 | 0 | 1 | 0 | 39 (2) | 0 |
| 28 | Paul Scott | England | DF | 2 (11) | 0 | 0 | 0 | 0 (1) | 0 | 0 | 0 | 2 (12) | 0 |
| 29 | Jon Worthington | England | MF | 10 (12) | 0 | 1 | 0 | 0 | 0 | 0 | 0 | 11 (12) | 0 |
| 31 | Paul Macari | England | FW | 0 (5) | 0 | 0 | 0 | 0 (1) | 0 | 0 | 0 | 0 (6) | 0 |
| 33 | Dwayne Mattis | Republic of Ireland | MF | 27 (6) | 1 | 1 | 0 | 1 (1) | 0 | 1 | 1 | 30 (7) | 2 |
| 35 | Phil Senior | England | GK | 16 (2) | 0 | 0 | 0 | 0 | 0 | 0 | 0 | 16 (2) | 0 |
| 37 | John McCombe | England | DF | 0 (1) | 0 | 0 | 0 | 0 | 0 | 0 | 0 | 0 (1) | 0 |
| 38 | David Mirfin | England | DF | 0 (1) | 0 | 0 | 0 | 0 | 0 | 0 | 0 | 0 (1) | 0 |
