= Steve Yates (footballer, born 1970) =

English footballer

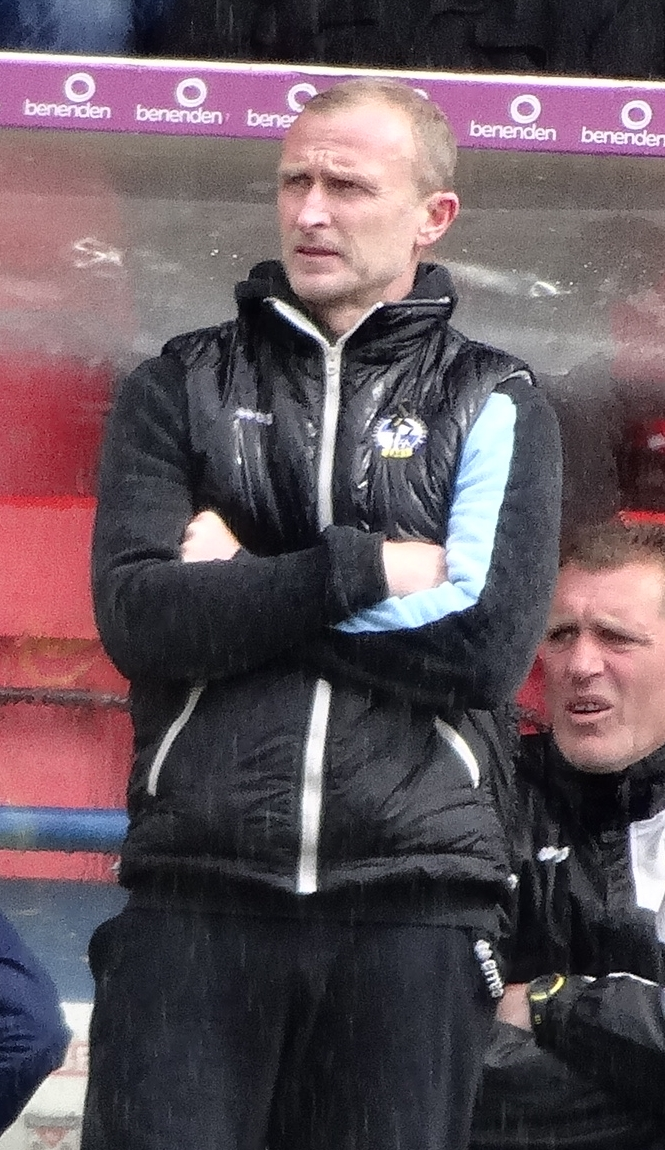
- Yates with Bristol Rovers in 2016

Personal information
- Full name: Stephen Yates
- Date of birth: 29 January 1970 (age 56)
- Place of birth: Bristol, England
- Height: 5 ft 10 in (1.78 m)
- Position: Defender

Senior career*
Years	Team	Apps	(Gls)
1988–1993	Bristol Rovers	197	(0)
1993–1999	Queens Park Rangers	135	(2)
1999–2002	Tranmere Rovers	113	(7)
2002–2003	Sheffield United	12	(0)
2003–2005	Huddersfield Town	52	(1)
2006	Scarborough	1	(0)
2006	Halifax Town	3	(0)
2006	Morecambe	8	(0)
2006	Caernarfon Town	2	(0)
Total		523	(10)
- * Club domestic league appearances and goals as of 18 June 2007

Stephen Yates (born 29 January 1970) is an English football coach and former professional footballer.

As a player who played as a defender, who notably played in the Premier League for Queens Park Rangers, as well as in the English Football League for Bristol Rovers, Tranmere Rovers, Sheffield United, Huddersfield Town and Morecambe. He also played non-league football for Scarborough and Halifax Town before retiring with Welsh Premier League club Caernarfon Town.

In 2013, he returned to his first club, Bristol Rovers, as the club's new kit manager, A year later he combined this role with coaching.

== Playing career ==
Yates began his footballing career as a YTS trainee at Bristol Rovers in 1986. In seven years with his home town club he played 197 games without scoring any goals.

When manager Gerry Francis moved to Queens Park Rangers from Bristol Rovers in 1991, a number of Rovers players later followed him to the London club. Yates was one of these, when he joined in August 1993. He made his debut that month against Liverpool. Yates played 134 league games for Queens Park Rangers and scored 2 goals before transferring to Tranmere Rovers in 1999.

Yates was a cult hero at Tranmere, and is best remembered for scoring two goals in a Merseyside derby against Everton at Goodison Park when Tranmere beat the Premier League outfit 3–0 in the 2000-01 FA Cup. That same season he also scored one of the goals as Tranmere knocked Leeds United out of the League Cup. Yates remained with the club until 2002 when he transferred to Sheffield United. Whilst at Tranmere he played in the 2000 Football League Cup Final, coming on as a substitute in the final against Leicester City.

Yates joined Huddersfield Town in 2003 on a free after a successful trial period. He was Peter Jackson's first signing as Huddersfield's manager for the second time. He scored his only goal for Huddersfield against Leyton Orient. During a fixture with Carlisle United Yates had a bust-up in the tunnel at the Galpharm Stadium with opposing player Richie Foran which resulted in red cards for both players and Yates losing a front tooth.

Yates decided to retire in mid-2005, although he came out of retirement in January 2006 to play just 1 game for Scarborough. He then transferred to Halifax Town where he played 3 games and left at the end of the 2005–2006 season.

In May 2006, Morecambe snapped Yates up on a free transfer and played 8 games for the Shrimps. Soccerbase incorrectly state that Yates played 44 games and scored 2 goals during the 2006–2007 season but research has shown that Yates signed for Caernarfon Town in September 2006 by his ex-playing colleague Kenny Irons.

Yates played only two games for Caernarfon Town. The rest of his spell at the club he was side-lined with injury.

== Coaching career ==
Yates returned to Bristol Rovers in July 2013 as kit man and a year later combined that role with coaching. In his first season as defensive coach, Rovers gained promotion from the Conference. Yates remained at the club until the end of the 2016–17 season as he would be returning to Crete.

== Honours ==
Bristol Rovers

- Football League Third Division: 1989–90
- Associate Members' Cup runner-up: 1989–90

Tranmere Rovers

- Football League Cup runner-up: 1999–2000

Huddersfield Town

- Football League Third Division play-offs: 2004
