= Lee Fowler =

Welsh footballer and manager

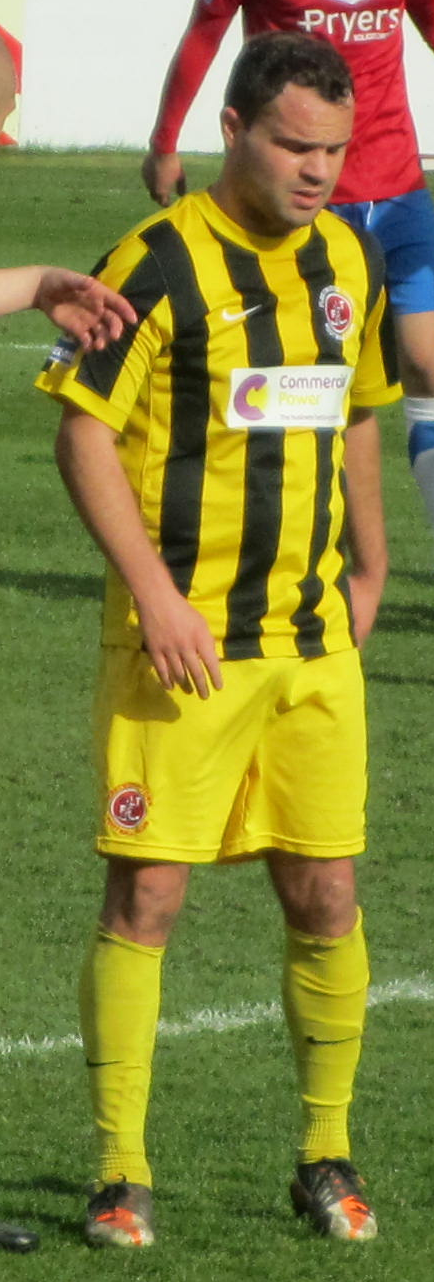
- Fowler playing for Fleetwood Town in 2012

Personal information
- Full name: Lee Anthony Fowler
- Date of birth: 10 June 1983 (age 43)
- Place of birth: Cardiff, Wales
- Position: Midfielder

Team information
- Current team: Flint Town United (director of football)

Senior career*
Years	Team	Apps	(Gls)
1999–2003	Coventry City	14	(0)
2003	→ Huddersfield Town (loan)	16	(0)
2003–2006	Huddersfield Town	33	(0)
2005–2006	→ Scarborough (loan)	25	(3)
2006–2007	Burton Albion	22	(2)
2007	→ Newport County (loan)	13	(0)
2007–2008	Newport County	34	(4)
2008–2009	Forest Green Rovers	40	(1)
2009	Kettering Town	17	(1)
2010	Oxford United	0	(0)
2010	Cirencester Town	1	(0)
2010	Halesowen Town	1	(0)
2010	Forest Green Rovers	11	(0)
2011–2012	Wrexham	29	(3)
2012–2013	Fleetwood Town	29	(0)
2013	Doncaster Rovers	4	(0)
2013	→ Forest Green Rovers (loan)	5	(0)
2013	→ Burton Albion (loan)	3	(0)
2013–2014	Kidderminster Harriers	26	(0)
2014	The New Saints	3	(0)
2014	Cefn Druids	0	(0)
2014–2015	Nuneaton Town	11	(2)
2015	→ Crawley Town (loan)	18	(1)
2015–2016	Wrexham	18	(3)
2015–2016	→ Tamworth (loan)	5	(0)
2016	AFC Telford United	3	(0)
2018	Holywell Town	0	(0)
Total		381	(20)

International career
	Wales U21	12	(0)

Managerial career
- 2018: Nuneaton Borough (assistant)
- 2018: Nuneaton Borough
- 2018–2019: Ilkeston Town
- 2019: Bradford (Park Avenue) (assistant)
- 2020–2021: Radcliffe
- 2022–2026: Flint Town United
- 2026: Flint Town United (Director of Football)
- * Club domestic league appearances and goals

Lee Anthony Fowler (born 10 June 1983) is a Welsh professional football coach and a former player who played as a midfielder. He earned 12 Wales Under-21 caps.

Fowler's career has taken in stints at an array of clubs within the English game; considered a journeyman, he has notably played in the Football League for Coventry City, Huddersfield Town, Fleetwood Town, Doncaster Rovers and latterly Crawley Town.

== Club career ==
=== Coventry City ===
Fowler joined the ranks at English Premier League side Coventry City in the 1999–2000 season. The club at the time were managed by Gordon Strachan, and Fowler was amongst the Sky Blues squad for the club's final two appearances in the top flight of English football. At the end of the 2000–01 season, City were relegated along with Manchester City and Bradford City. However Fowler would not make a single appearance for the club in the top flight, and did not make his professional debut until the following season when Strachan's replacement as manager, Roland Nilsson gave him his first opportunity bringing him on as a substitute to replace Barry Quinn in the 68th minute of a league defeat at home to Burnley on 17 November 2001. Fowler would go on to make 13 appearances for Coventry during the 2001–02 season. During the 2002–03 season, City had replaced Nilsson with Gary McAllister and this saw Fowler only feature three times in the entire season. He went on to score his first senior goal in football, coming in an FA Cup tie with Cardiff City on 15 January 2003.

=== Huddersfield Town ===
During the summer of 2003, Fowler was placed on the loan list and joined Huddersfield Town for an initial three-month period. He made his Town debut on the opening day of the 2003–04 League Two campaign against Cambridge United. Fowler went on to make 19 appearances in all competitions during his loan spell in West Yorkshire, and on 13 November 2003 he was released from his Coventry contract thus allowing him to join with Huddersfield on a permanent basis. Fowler would go on to make a further 19 appearances for Town following his switch, scoring no goals, but collecting a tally of 8 yellow cards, and 2 red cards during his season. Huddersfield qualified for the play-offs, but Fowler was uninvolved for the semi-final legs over Lincoln City, however Town progressed and Fowler came on as an 85th-minute substitute for Jonathan Worthington in the final at the Millennium Stadium against Mansfield Town. However the game has gone to extra time and then penalties meaning Fowler would have a full 35 minutes on the field, including scoring the winning penalty that earned his club promotion to League One. The following season Fowler played a cameo role in the club's 2004–05 season, and finished the campaign having featured 23 times in all competitions, scoring one with a further 4 yellow cards and 1 red card to add to his disciplinary tally. In June 2005 he joined Grimsby Town on trial along with a handful of other players hoping to earn a contract at Blundell Park. However, despite playing in 4 pre-season friendlies, as well as joining the Grimsby squad in a pre-season Army training camp, Fowler was snubbed a full-time contract with boss Russell Slade signing Ciaran Toner, Paul Bolland and Jean-Paul Kamudimba Kalala to play in Fowler's central midfield role. He returned to Huddersfield and predictably started the 2005–06 season out of favour. In November 2005, after not making a single appearance so far that season, Fowler joined Scarborough on loan.

=== Scarborough ===
He joined debt riddled Conference National side Scarborough on loan in November 2005, sealing Fowler's first taste of Non-League football. Fowler was brought to the club by Neil Redfearn, and would only play for The Seadogs for one season, making 25 appearances and scoring 3 goals. Following the crippling debt at the McCain Stadium, Scarborough found it near impossible to stay in the Conference and were relegated to the Conference North division. The money troubles and demotion meant that the club culled all but a few of its playing staff for the following season. Fowler was one of the players who left Scarborough at the end of their final season inside the top 5 leagues in English football. Under a year after Fowler left, the club eventually went bust and became defunct.

=== Burton Albion ===
In the summer of 2006, Fowler was signed by Nigel Clough for Burton Albion. Fowler would go on to make 23 appearances for The Brewers, scoring once during the 2006–2007 season. He subsequently signed with Welsh outfit Newport County on a loan deal until the end of the season. At the end of the campaign, Fowler was released.

=== Newport County ===
Following a fruitful short loan spell in the previous season, Fowler signed a one-year deal with Newport County playing in the Conference South division. Fowler made 34 appearances for County, scoring 4 goals. At the end of the 2007–2008 season, he left the club.

=== Forest Green Rovers ===
Fowler moved back up a league and returned to the Conference National to sign with Jim Harvey and his Forest Green Rovers side. Fowler played out the entire 2008–09 season with the club, making a total of 46 appearances in all competition, scoring a single goal, coming in a league encounter with Weymouth. On 2 June 2009, Fowler turned down the chance of renewing his contract with Forest Green and signed for Kettering Town on a two-year contract.

=== Kettering Town ===
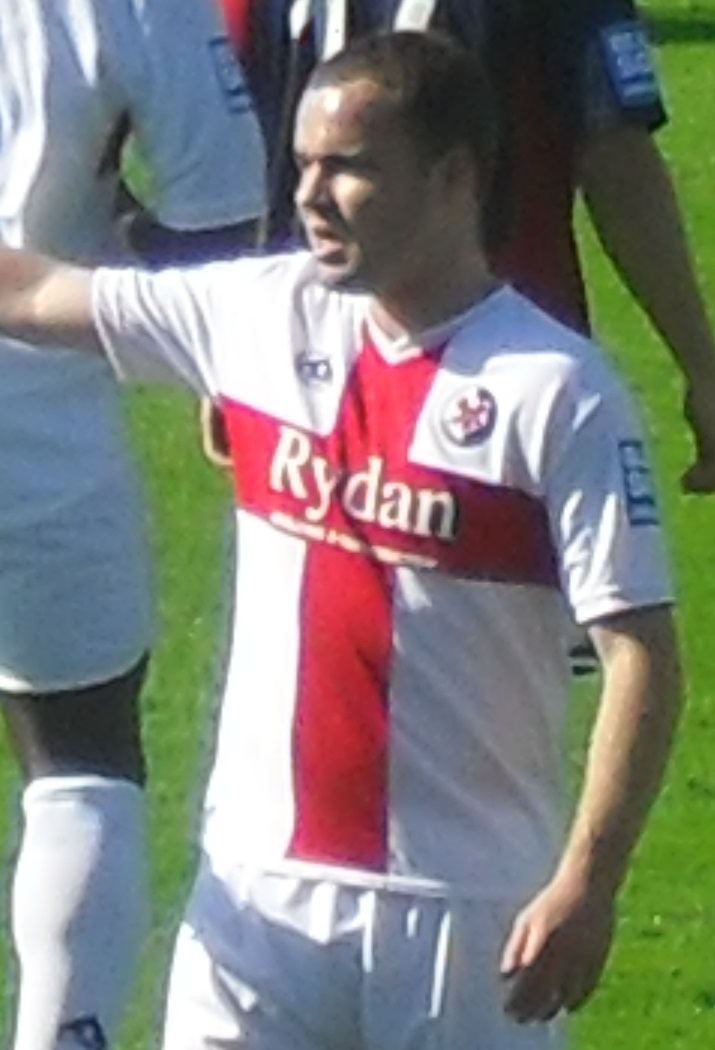
Fowler playing for Kettering Town in 2009

Fowler signed for Kettering and made his debut for the play-off pushing side against his former club Forest Green on the opening day of the 2009–10 campaign. Following the departure of his manager Mark Cooper, who had moved to join Peterborough United, Fowler became increasingly unsettled at the club, and publicly expressed his desire to leave the club, commenting he did not want to play for the club. Fowler was criticised by Kettering's chairman, Imraan Ladak, for his bad attitude and alleged desire to leave the club. However, after featuring in his last game in the league on 24 November 2009, Fowler was brought on as a substitute in the club's crucial FA Cup second round replay against Leeds United at Elland Road. With the game at 1–1, and player-manager Lee Harper in goal, assistant manager John Deehan brought on Fowler in extra time to replace Patrick Noubissie in the 106th minute of play. Kettering went on to concede 4 goals in the next 14 minutes to lose the game 5–1. Deehan was sacked after the match by Ladak for using Fowler, claiming that he did not think his side would have conceded had Fowler not been in the team, and also that he was only on the bench to make up the numbers, and not to be brought on to the field. Fowler had his contract with Kettering terminated by mutual consent on 27 December 2009.

=== Oxford United ===
A few days later Fowler signed for fellow Conference side Oxford United, however in March 2010, after making just one substitute appearance for United, Fowler was released.

=== Cirencester Town ===
A few days later, he signed for Southern Football League side Cirencester Town. Fowler played only one game for Cirencester until moving on once more later that month.

=== Halesowen Town ===
Fowler signed up with Southern Premier League side Halesowen Town a few days after leaving Cirencester. Fowler left Halesowen at the end of the 2009–10 season.

=== Return to Forest Green Rovers ===
In June 2010 Fowler re-joined Forest Green alongside his brother, Mike. He made just nine league appearances before picking up a knee injury. He was then released on 16 December 2010 when he was not offered a contract by the club.

=== Wrexham ===
He then began training with Wrexham and played for the Welsh club in a reserve game against Burnley. On 14 January 2011 Fowler signed a short-term contract at Wrexham.

Despite agreeing a longer contract in the summer and playing in the majority of the team's games, he handed in a transfer request in December saying he was "not happy" at the club having felt "derailed" since manager Dean Saunders and his assistant Brian Carey had left to go to Doncaster.

=== Fleetwood Town ===
On 9 January 2012, Fowler signed with Conference rivals Fleetwood Town for an undisclosed fee.

=== Doncaster Rovers ===
After managing him at Wrexham and trying to get Fowler to Doncaster in the past, Dean Saunders signed him on 4 January 2013 for an undisclosed fee till the end of the season. He made his first appearance the following day against Colchester coming on as sub in a 1–0 win which took the club to joint top of the League 1 table on points.

On 26 February 2013, Fowler returned to Forest Green Rovers for a month loan deal, marking his third spell at the Nailsworth club. He made his third debut for the club later that day in a 2–0 defeat against Woking, coming on as a half time substitute for Eddie Oshodi.

He was then loaned to Burton Albion for the remainder of the season on 28 March 2013.

=== Kidderminster Harriers ===
On 19 June 2013, Fowler signed for Conference National side Kidderminster Harriers on a two-year deal. On 31 January 2014, Fowler's contract was mutually terminated.

=== The New Saints ===
On 10 February 2014, Fowler signed a deal with The New Saints. He made his debut in a Welsh Premier League game against Airbus UK Broughton, coming on as a sub in the 1–1 draw.

=== Cefn Druids ===
After leaving TNS, Fowler joined fellow League of Wales side Cefn Druids for the coming season, their first season in the Welsh top flight for 4 years. Fowler played for the Druids for just a month failing to make an appearance before leaving the Rock, his only involvement was as an unused substitute in a 5–0 league defeat to Aberystwyth.

=== Nuneaton Town ===
In August 2014 Fowler joined Conference Premier club Nuneaton Town, his fourth club in the calendar year.

=== Crawley Town (Loan) ===
During the January transfer window he joined up with his old Wrexham and Doncaster Rovers boss Dean Saunders, signing a loan deal with Crawley Town for the remainder of the season.

=== Wrexham (Second spell) ===
In May 2015 Fowler announced on social media that he had re-joined his old club Wrexham, becoming the 5th summer signing of new manager Gary Mills. He signed a deal with his old club a few days later after passing a medical. Fowler was released by Wrexham at the end of the season.

=== Holywell Town F.C ===
On Thursday 15 February 2018, Holywell Town F.C announced Fowler's signing.

== International career ==
Fowler won 12 caps for the Wales under-21s and one cap in an under 20 match against South Korea in 2003. He was also called up to the senior squad for a friendly against Argentina in February 2002, however he stayed on the bench and was ultimately never capped by Wales.

== Coaching career ==
=== Nuneaton Borough ===
In June 2018 Fowler was named as the Assistant Manager to Nicky Eaden at Nuneaton Borough F.C. The pair had worked together before, when Fowler was a player under Eaden at Kettering. When Eaden left the club in November 2018, Fowler was promoted to manager, but he left by mutual consent only two weeks later on 6 December 2018.

=== Ilkeston Town ===
On 20 December 2018 Fowler was named as Manager at Ilkeston Town F.C. He led the team to the Midland Football League Premier Division title with an 8–1 win over Loughborough University F.C. on the last day of the season, beating Walsall Wood F.C. to the title on goal difference. He left the club at the end of the season.

=== Bradford (Park Avenue) ===
On 9 August 2019 it was confirmed, that Marcus Law had been appointed interim manager of Bradford (Park Avenue) A.F.C. with Fowler as his interim assistant manager. The duo was replaced on 30 September 2019.

=== Radcliffe ===
In February 2020 he was appointed manager of Radcliffe.

=== Flint Town United ===
In June 2022 he was appointed manager of Flint Town United. In March 2026 he took on the role of Director of Football at the club, with Steve Evans becoming first team manager. In September 2026 he was sacked by the club afer a poor start to the season.

== Personal life ==
In October 2010, Fowler revealed he was suffering from alcoholism and was receiving treatment along with support from his employers, Forest Green. His brother Mike Fowler was also a footballer but was forced into early retirement due to injury after spells with Salisbury City, Newport County and Forest Green Rovers.

Fowler is the father to two children, the youngest of which was born in February 2018.

== Honours ==
Huddersfield Town

- Football League Third Division play-offs: 2004
