= Abdou Sall =

Senegalese footballer

Personal information
- Date of birth: 1 November 1980 (age 45)
- Place of birth: Dakar, Senegal
- Height: 1.91 m (6 ft 3 in)
- Position: Centre-back

Youth career
- Montauban FCTG

Senior career*
Years	Team	Apps	(Gls)
2000–2001	Toulouse B	1	(0)
2001–2005	Kidderminster Harriers	52	(2)
2002–2003	→ Oxford United (loan)	2	(0)
2003	→ Nuneaton Borough (loan)	3	(0)
2004	→ Cinderford Town (loan)	2	(0)
2005–2006	Forest Green Rovers	26	(4)
2006–2008	FC St. Pauli	2	(0)
2006–2008	FC St. Pauli II	2	(0)
2010–2011	Altona 93		
2011–2012	FC Sylt		
- * Club domestic league appearances and goals

Abdou Sall (born 1 November 1980) is a Senegalese former professional footballer who played as a centre-back.

== Career ==
Born in Dakar, Senegal, Sall moved to France at the age of four with his father where he grew up in Toulouse. He played for Forest Green Rovers of the Conference National in the 2005–06 season. having joined in summer 2005 from League Two team Kidderminster Harriers on a free transfer.

He previously spent time with Oxford United and Nuneaton Borough.

Sall played in Germany with 2. Bundesliga side FC St. Pauli until 2008 but was kept out of action through injury for most of his time there.
