= Ian Gray (English footballer) =

English footballer

Personal information
- Full name: Ian James Gray
- Date of birth: 25 February 1975 (age 51)
- Place of birth: Manchester, England
- Position: Goalkeeper

Youth career
- Oldham Athletic

Senior career*
Years	Team	Apps	(Gls)
1993–1995	Oldham Athletic	0	(0)
1994	→ Brunei (loan)		
1994–1995	→ Rochdale (loan)	12	(0)
1995–1997	Rochdale	66	(0)
1997–2000	Stockport County	16	(0)
2000–2003	Rotherham United	40	(0)
2003–2004	Huddersfield Town	29	(0)
Total		163	(0)
- * Club domestic league appearances and goals

Ian James Gray (born 25 February 1975 in Manchester) is an English former professional footballer, who made 163 appearances in the Football League as a goalkeeper playing for Rochdale, Stockport County, Rotherham United and Huddersfield Town. He also played in the 1994 Liga Perdana for Brunei on loan from Oldham Athletic.

He was forced into an early retirement in 2004 at the age of 29 because of a broken hand sustained during an FA Cup 1st Round tie against Accrington Stanley while he was playing for Huddersfield Town.
