= Rob Edwards (footballer, born 1970) =

English footballer

Personal information
- Full name: Robert Edwards
- Date of birth: 23 February 1970 (age 56)
- Place of birth: Manchester, England
- Positions: Defender; midfielder; forward

Youth career
- Crewe Alexandra

Senior career*
Years	Team	Apps	(Gls)
1988–1996	Crewe Alexandra	155	(44)
1996–2000	Huddersfield Town	139	(15)
2000–2003	Chesterfield	93	(7)
2003–2005	Huddersfield Town	41	(3)
2005–2006	Ossett Albion		
2006	Mossley		
- * Club domestic league appearances and goals

Robert Edwards (born 23 February 1970) is a former professional footballer, who started out as a forward and changed to a defender or midfielder. He played in the Football League for Crewe Alexandra, Huddersfield Town and Chesterfield before retiring and starting his own joiner business in 2006.

== Career ==
=== Crewe Alexandra ===
Edwards came through the youth system at Crewe Alexandra, making his first team debut, aged 17, when coming on as a substitute in a 2–1 win over Newport County in a Fourth Division game at Gresty Road on 13 February 1988. He made his first Crewe start and scored his first Crewe goal in a 3–0 FA Cup second round victory over Runcorn on 10 December 1988, but was mainly restricted to occasional substitute appearances until the 1990-91 season, during which he scored 11 times in 32 appearances, including eight goals from 17 league starts in Crewe's final games of the season. In the opening fixture of the following season on 17 August 1991, Edwards scored a hat-trick as Crewe won 7–4 at Barnet in the London club's first Football League match. He scored another hat-trick in his penultimate Crewe appearance, a 3–2 victory at local rivals Wrexham on 2 March 1996. In 198 Crewe appearances, he scored 58 goals before being sold to Huddersfield Town for £150,000 on 8 March 1996.

=== Huddersfield Town ===
Edwards had two spells at Huddersfield Town. He scored two of the most important goals in his career at Huddersfield one in 1997 against Manchester City where Huddersfield passed the ball 16 times around the field for it to fall for Edwards outside the 18 yard box to smash it into the back of the net. And in 2004 scored the goal that took Town through to the play off final.

He was released by Huddersfield at the end of the 2004–05 season, joining Ossett Albion from where he joined Mossley in May 2006. He retired in November 2006 after playing just 11 times for Mossley. He is now involved with Holmfirth Town F.C..

== Honours ==
Huddersfield Town

- Football League Third Division play-offs: 2004
