= Nathan Clarke (English footballer) =

English footballer

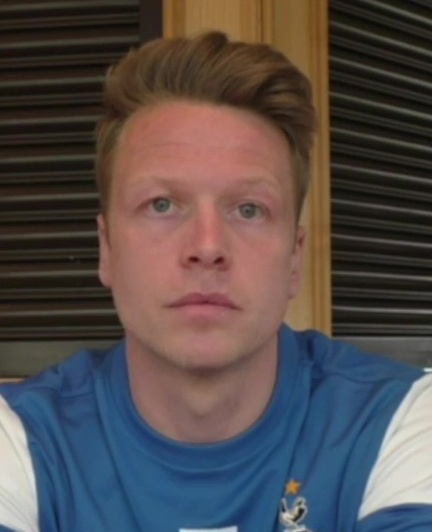

Personal information
- Full name: Nathan Clarke
- Date of birth: 30 November 1983 (age 42)
- Place of birth: Halifax, West Yorkshire, England
- Height: 6 ft 2 in (1.88 m)
- Position: Defender

Youth career
- –2001: Huddersfield Town

Senior career*
Years	Team	Apps	(Gls)
2001–2012	Huddersfield Town	266	(8)
2011	→ Colchester United (loan)	18	(0)
2011–2012	→ Oldham Athletic (loan)	16	(1)
2012	→ Bury (loan)	11	(0)
2012–2015	Leyton Orient	113	(2)
2015–2017	Bradford City	25	(0)
2017	Coventry City	18	(0)
2017–2018	Grimsby Town	45	(2)
2018–2021	FC Halifax Town	104	(6)
Total		616	(19)

Managerial career
- 2019: FC Halifax Town (co-caretaker)
- * Club domestic league appearances and goals

Nathan Clarke (born 30 November 1983) is an English former footballer professional footballer who played as a centre-back.

In a career that last from 2001 until 2021 Clarke represented Huddersfield Town, Colchester United, Oldham Athletic, Bury, Leyton Orient, Bradford City, Coventry City, Grimsby Town and FC Halifax Town.

== Playing career ==
=== Huddersfield Town ===
Clarke is a product of the Huddersfield Town Academy. He began his first team career at the age of just 17 when his debut came in a 1–1 draw away to Stoke City on 8 September 2001. He scored his first goal for his home club on his home debut in the game in which ended in a 4–2 loss against Blackpool. He made a total of 37 starts in all competitions during the 2001–02 season his first as a professional with the first team with 36 of them coming in the league scoring once.

Clarke was runner-up in the Huddersfield Town 'Player of the Year' 2005–06 and was made vice-captain of the team aged just 21, going on to win the title the following year along with winning the 'players player award'. Clarke played under eight different managers at the Galpharm and was in the starting 11 for each one.

Clarke has been selected in FourFourTwo's Top 50 Football League Players at 43 in March 2006, down from 40 in the list in March 2005.

On 27 January 2011, after failing to break into Lee Clark's team, Clarke joined League One club Colchester United on loan until the end of the season. He made 18 appearances for the U's.

On 19 August 2011, he joined Oldham Athletic on a five-month loan deal. He made his debut the following day, where he also scored the first goal. Clarke returned to his parent club Huddersfield Town after making 16 appearances for Oldham. He then on 9 March, joined Bury on loan for the remainder of the season. He played a huge part in the club's league survival in the league, with them finishing mid table.

He left Huddersfield Town in June 2012 after playing over 300 games for his home town club (and almost 20 years at the club he has supported since he was a boy), 11 of those as pro.

=== Leyton Orient ===
Clarke signed for Leyton Orient on 18 July 2012 on a two-year contract. Boss Russell Slade made him the club captain of the London side within a week of being signed. On 14 February 2014, he signed a contract extension at Leyton Orient. He scored his first goal for the club on 11 March 2014 in the 2–0 win at Port Vale, a header at the near post from a corner. Two games later, Clarke scored an equalising goal in the 1–1 draw at Walsall, a deflected half-volley long-range shot in the 77th minute. Clarke was part of the team that played in the 2014 Football League One play-off final against Rotherham United, the game finishing 2–2 Orient lost 3–4 in a penalty shoot out.

On 24 July 2015, Clarke left the club in order to be closer to his family.

=== Bradford City ===
Clarke joined Bradford City on 28 July 2015 on a one-year contract.

=== Coventry City ===
Clarke joined Coventry City on 1 January 2017 as one of three new signings made by new Sky Blues manager Russell Slade, who had previously been his boss at Leyton Orient. He made his debut for the club the following day in the 2–2 draw at home to Bolton Wanderers. Clarke was cup-tied in the 2016–17 EFL Trophy due to playing for Bradford earlier in the season, his team went on to winning the 2017 EFL Trophy final.

After making 18 appearances for Coventry in the 2016–17 season he was released by the club on 2 May 2017.

=== Grimsby Town ===
On 23 June 2017, Clarke signed a one-year contract with League Two side Grimsby Town on a free transfer. He scored his first goal for Grimsby on his debut in a 3–1 win over Chesterfield on 5 August 2017. He was released by Grimsby at the end of the 2017–18 season.

=== FC Halifax Town ===
On 3 August 2018, Clarke signed for his home town side FC Halifax Town following a trial spell during pre-season. He was made caretaker manager alongside Steve Nichol following the resignation of Jamie Fullarton on 15 July 2019. Clarke announced his retirement from professional football at the end of the 2020–21 season.

== Personal life ==
Clarke has a younger brother, defender/midfielder Tom Clarke who plays for League One club Fleetwood Town.

== Career statistics ==
=== Club ===
As of match played 12 September 2017

Appearances and goals by club, season and competition
Club	Season	League			FA Cup		League Cup		Other		Total	
Club	Season	Division	Apps	Goals	Apps	Goals	Apps	Goals	Apps	Goals	Apps	Goals
Huddersfield Town	2001–02	Second Division	36	1	1	0	0	0	4 (Note: Appearances in Football League Trophy)	0	41	1
Huddersfield Town	2002–03	Second Division	3	0	0	0	0	0	0	0	3	0
Huddersfield Town	2003–04	Third Division	26	1	1	0	1	0	0	0	28	1
Huddersfield Town	2004–05	League One	37	0	1	0	1	0	1	0	40	0
Huddersfield Town	2005–06	League One	48	0	3	0	2	0	1	0	54	0
Huddersfield Town	2006–07	League One	16	0	1	0	1	0	1	0	19	0
Huddersfield Town	2007–08	League One	44	2	4	0	1	0	1	0	50	2
Huddersfield Town	2008–09	League One	38	3	1	0	1	0	0	0	40	3
Huddersfield Town	2009–10	League One	17	1	3	1	1	0	3 (Note: Two appearances in Football League Trophy and one in League One play-offs)	1	24	3
Huddersfield Town	2010–11	League One	1	0	0	0	0	0	0	0	1	0
Huddersfield Town	Total		266	8	15	1	8	0	11	1	300	10
Colchester United (loan)	2010–11	League One	18	0	0	0	0	0	0	0	18	0
Oldham Athletic (loan)	2011–12	League One	16	1	2	0	0	0	2	0	20	1
Bury (loan)	2011–12	League One	11	0	0	0	0	0	0	0	11	0
Leyton Orient	2012–13	League One	34	0	1	0	2	0	1	0	38	0
Leyton Orient	2013–14	League One	46	2	2	0	1	0	5 (Note: Two appearances in Football League Trophy and three in League One play-offs)	0	54	2
Leyton Orient	2014–15	League One	33	0	1	0	2	0	3	0	39	0
Leyton Orient	Total		113	2	4	0	5	0	9	0	131	2
Bradford City	2015–16	League One	25	0	2	0	1	0	3 (Note: One appearance in Football League Trophy and two in League One play-offs)	0	31	0
Bradford City	2016–17	League One	0	0	1	0	0	0	3 (Note: Appearances in EFL Trophy)	0	4	0
Bradford City	Total		25	0	3	0	1	0	6	0	35	0
Coventry City	2016–17	League One	18	0	0	0	0	0	0	0	18	0
Grimsby Town	2017–18	League Two	45	2	0	0	1	0	1	0	47	2
Career total			474	12	24	1	15	0	29	1	542	14

== Honours ==
=== Player ===
Huddersfield Town

- Football League Third Division play-offs: 2004

Coventry City

- EFL Trophy: 2016–17
