= Phil Senior =

English footballer

Personal information
- Full name: Phillip Anthony Senior
- Date of birth: 30 October 1982 (age 44)
- Place of birth: Huddersfield, England
- Height: 1.80 m (5 ft 11 in)
- Position: Goalkeeper

Youth career
- Huddersfield Town

Senior career*
Years	Team	Apps	(Gls)
1999–2006	Huddersfield Town	54	(0)
2006–2007	Northwich Victoria	25	(0)
2007	Droylsden	2	(0)
2007–2008	Alfreton Town	6	(0)
2008	Ilkeston Town	2	(0)
2008–2015	FC Halifax Town	17	(0)
Total		106	(0)
- * Club domestic league appearances and goals as of 10:15, 25 September 2015 (UTC)

Phillip Anthony Senior (born 30 October 1982) is a former professional footballer who played as a goalkeeper.

== Career ==
Senior made his first impact on the football scene at the age of 16 when Huddersfield manager Peter Jackson named him on the Town bench for a FA Cup tie against Wrexham in 1999.

After spending periods of time playing for Northwich Victoria, Droylsden, Alfreton Town and Ilkeston Town, Senior signed for FC Halifax Town in 2008. After starting work as a cover teacher at The Brooksbank School, Senior retired in 2015 to focus on a full-time career in teaching.

== Honours ==
Huddersfield Town

- Football League Third Division play-offs: 2004
