= Andy Holdsworth =

English former footballer (born 1984)

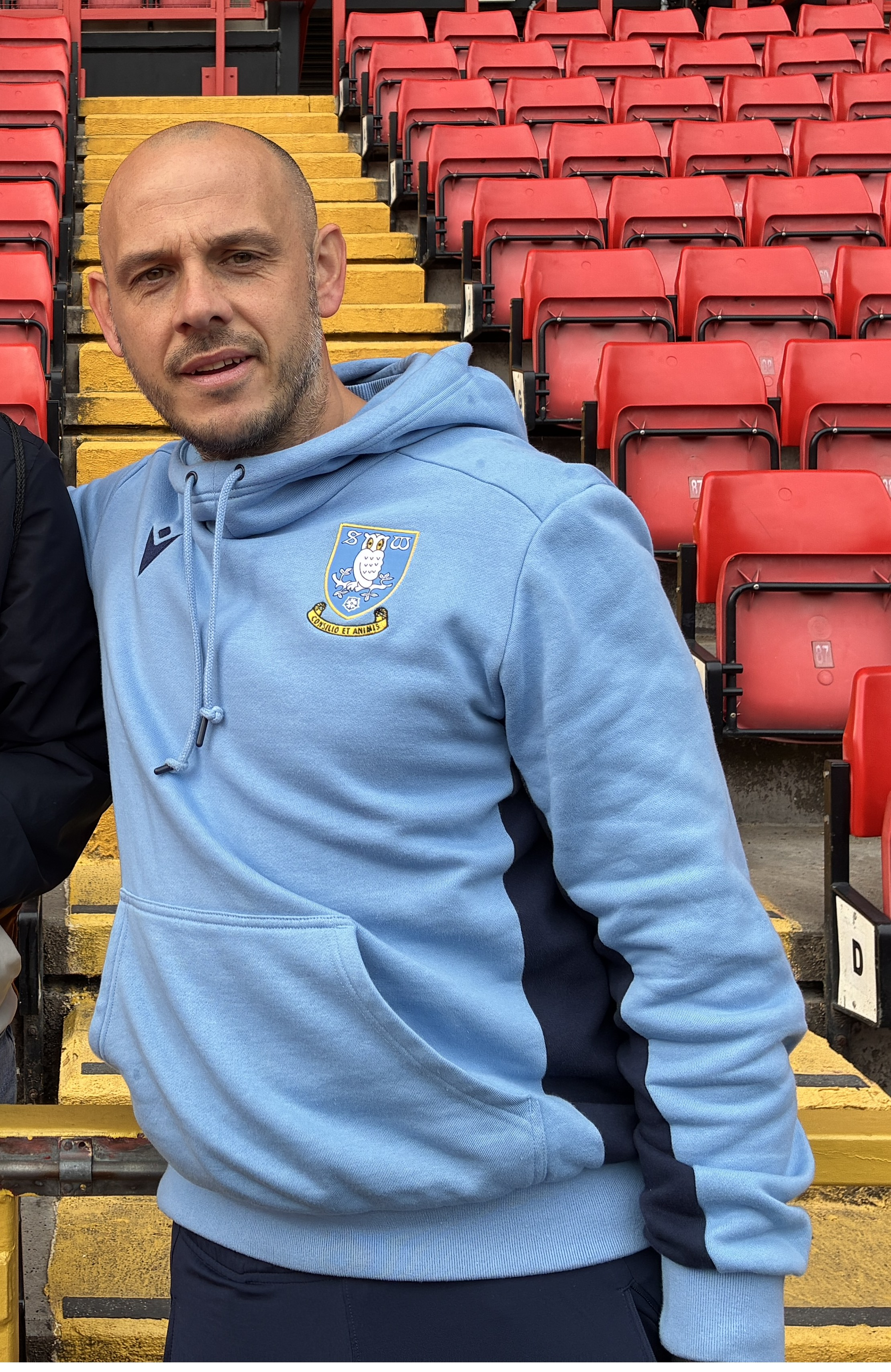
- Holdsworth in 2025.

Personal information
- Full name: Andrew Holdsworth
- Date of birth: 29 January 1984 (age 42)
- Place of birth: Pontefract, England
- Height: 5 ft 9 in (1.75 m)
- Positions: Defender; midfielder

Team information
- Current team: Sheffield Wednesday (PDP coach)

Youth career
- –2003: Huddersfield Town

Senior career*
Years	Team	Apps	(Gls)
2003–2009	Huddersfield Town	231	(6)
2009–2011	Oldham Athletic	12	(0)
2011	Morecambe	14	(1)
2011	Alfreton Town	4	(0)
2011–2015	Guiseley	155	(12)
Total		416	(19)

International career
2006	Football League U21	1	(0)
- * Club domestic league appearances and goals

Andrew Holdsworth (born 29 January 1984) is an English professional football coach and former player who is currently a PDP coach at EFL League One club Sheffield Wednesday. He has previously played for Huddersfield Town, Oldham Athletic and Morecambe.

== Playing career ==
=== Huddersfield Town ===
A product of the Huddersfield Town academy, Holdsworth made his professional debut in the 2003–04 season aged 19. He was a substitute in the 2–1 victory over Bristol Rovers at the Galpharm Stadium and quickly went on to establish himself in the first team. During the season, playing at right-back, he made 39 league appearances (five as a substitute).

He scored his first professional goal against Sunderland at the Stadium of Light in a League Cup tie which Huddersfield won 4–2, a goal which was aided by referee Mark Cooper's decision to play-on following a handball by Ben Clark.

In late 2006, he was named on Alisdair Straughan's list of Huddersfield Town's Fans' Favourites, one of 6 members of the then current squad to be named.

In April 2007, Holdsworth signed an extension to his contract, which would see him stay at the Galpharm until 2009. After a move from full back into midfield, he scored his first two goals of the season in the final league match of 2006–07 at home to Leyton Orient where Huddersfield won 3–1.

On 26 April 2008, Holdsworth was named Town's Player of the Year, with 40% of the votes. Second was goalkeeper Matt Glennon and third was Andy Booth.

=== Oldham Athletic ===
On 26 May 2009, after failing to agree a new contract, he left Huddersfield Town. After playing 2 friendlies for Bradford City, he was offered a two-year deal at Oldham Athletic, which he accepted. He played fifteen games for the club before being released on 28 January 2011.

=== Morecambe ===
In January 2011, Holdsworth signed with Morecambe until the end of the season, and made his debut against Accrington Stanley on 1 February 2011. He was released at the end of the season.

=== Alfreton Town ===
On 31 August 2011, Holdsworth joined Alfreton Town of the Conference National. He took the number 23 shirt.

=== Guiseley ===
In October 2011, after four appearances for Alfreton, he joined Guiseley. He made his debut against Workington A.F.C., helping Guiseley to a 3–0 win thanks to goals from Danny Forrest, Ciaron Toner and striker Gavin Allot. He now plays right-back after the absence of Jamie Clarke. In the season of 2014–15 with the introduction of right-back Ryan Toulson, Mark Bower moved Holdsworth back into midfield where he is a great threat in front of goal. He was named club captain for the season, leading Guiseley to promotion to National league. Soon after Guiseley released Holdsworth.

== International career ==
In January 2006, Holdsworth was selected in the squad to represent the Football League u-21 side in a match against the Italian football league u-21s.

== Coaching career ==
Andy retired from football in 2015 to take up a full time coaching position at Barnsley. In September 2018, he took up a new role, joining Sheffield Wednesday as the clubs Professional Development Phase manager. During the COVID-19 pandemic, coaching staff Neil Thompson, Lee Bullen and Steven Haslam were all unable to take the FA Cup game away to Exeter City, so Holdsworth would get his first taste of first team management, winning the game 2–0. In July 2025, with first-team manager Danny Röhl not returning for pre-season training, Holdsworth was again asked to take training for the first-team. This would continue into the season following the appointment of Henrik Pedersen as first team manager and would become part of the first team staff alongside Giles Coke. After Pedersen left the club and Dave Challinor was appointed new manager, Holdworth returned to his role of focusing on individual player development for those aged 18 and above.

== Honours ==
Huddersfield Town

- Football League Third Division play-offs: 2004

Individual

- Huddersfield Town Supporters' Player of the Year: 2007–08
