= Tony Carss =

English footballer

Personal information
- Full name: Anthony John Carss
- Date of birth: 31 March 1976 (age 50)
- Place of birth: Alnwick, England
- Height: 5 ft 11 in (1.80 m)
- Position: Midfielder

Team information
- Current team: Aston Villa U21s

Youth career
- –1994: Bradford City

Senior career*
Years	Team	Apps	(Gls)
1994–1995	Blackburn Rovers	0	(0)
1995–1997	Darlington	57	(2)
1997–1998	Cardiff City	42	(1)
1999–2000	Chesterfield	35	(1)
2000	Carlisle United	7	(0)
2000–2003	Oldham Athletic	75	(5)
2003–2006	Huddersfield Town	80	(3)

Managerial career
- 2006–2017: Huddersfield Town U18s
- 2017: Huddersfield Town Academy (Head of Coaching)
- 2017–2022: Blackburn Rovers Academy (Head of Coaching)
- 2022–2023: Aston Villa U21s
- * Club domestic league appearances and goals

Anthony John Carss (born 31 March 1976) is an English football coach and former professional player, who works for Aston Villa Academy as Emerging Talent Programme Manager.

Carss started his career with Blackburn Rovers, and went on to Darlington, Cardiff City, Chesterfield, Oldham Athletic and Huddersfield Town.

After retiring from playing in 2006, Carss has also coached at Huddersfield Town Academy and Blackburn Rovers F.C. Academy.

== Career ==
=== Playing career ===
Carss signed his first professional contract with Blackburn Rovers in 1994, after finishing an apprenticeship with Bradford City. However, his playing career was punctuated by injury, and he left Blackburn having never played a league game. After spells at Darlington, Cardiff City, Chesterfield, Carlisle United and Oldham Athletic – in 2003 Carss joined Huddersfield Town, winning promotion via the Division Three play off final in 2004. And scoring a goal that some have said was one of the best goals in Huddersfield's history in a league game against Torquay United on 11 October 2003.

=== Coaching career ===
After being released by Huddersfield, Carss called an end to his playing career, expressing a desire to one day become a coach. However, he initially retrained to become a sports journalist, stating that his goal was still to try to transition into coaching, but that this was another way to stay in the football industry. He graduated from Staffordshire University with a degree in Professional Sports Writing and Broadcasting in summer of 2008.

At the same time, Carss worked as a coach for Huddersfield Town U18s. In 2017, Carss moved to Blackburn Rovers to take the role as their Head of Coaching. In June 2018, Carss achieved his UEFA Pro Licence, graduating alongside Nemanja Vidić, David James and Nicky Butt.

On 14 June 2022, Blackburn Rovers announced that Carss would leave his role later in that month, in order to take up a role at a Premier League club, which was later announced to be the role of Aston Villa Under-21s manager.

On 20 July 2023, after the appointment of Iñigo Idiakez as U21 Coach at Aston Villa, Carss was moved to the new role of Emerging Talent Programme Manager.

== Honours ==
=== As a player ===
Huddersfield Town

- Football League Third Division play-offs: 2004
