= 2004 Football League play-offs =

Football League play-offs
- Season: 2003–04
- Champions: Crystal Palace (First Division); Brighton & Hove Albion (Second Division); Huddersfield Town (Third Division)
- Matches played: 15
- Goals scored: 35 (2.33 per match)
- Biggest home win: West Ham 2–0 Ipswich (First Division)
- Biggest away win: Mansfield 1–3 Northampton (Third Division)
- Highest scoring: Crystal Palace 3–2 Sunderland (5 goals)
- Highest attendance: 72,523 – Crystal Palace v West Ham (First Division final)
- Lowest attendance: 6,876 – Brighton v Swindon (Second Division semi-final)
- Average attendance: 25,911

The Football League play-offs for the 2003–04 season were held in May 2004, with the finals taking place at Millennium Stadium in Cardiff. The play-off semi-finals will be played over two legs and will be contested by the teams who finish in 3rd, 4th, 5th and 6th place in the Football League First Division and Football League Second Division and the 4th, 5th, 6th and 7th placed teams in the Football League Third Division table. The winners of the semi-finals will go through to the finals, with the winner of the matches gaining promotion for the following season.

== Background ==
The Football League play-offs have been held every year since 1987. They take place for each division following the conclusion of the regular season and are contested by the four clubs finishing below the automatic promotion places.

In the First Division, Sunderland, who are aiming to return to the top flight after relegation last season, finished 7 points behind second placed West Bromwich Albion, who in turn finished 8 points behind champions Norwich City, who returned to the Premier League for the first time since 1995. West Ham United who are also along with Sunderland aiming to return to the top flight after relegation last season, finished in fourth place in the table. Ipswich Town who are looking for a place back in the top flight at the second attempt, finished in fifth place. Crystal Palace finished level on points with Ipswich Town and were looking for a place back in the Premiership for the first time since 1998.

== First Division ==
Pos	Team	Pld	W	D	L	GF	GA	GD	Pts
3	Sunderland	46	22	13	11	62	45	+17	79
4	West Ham United	46	19	17	10	72	61	+11	74
5	Ipswich Town	46	21	10	15	84	72	+12	73
6	Crystal Palace	46	21	10	15	72	61	+11	73

=== Semi-finals ===
First leg

14 May 2004
19:45

Crystal Palace	3–2	Sunderland
Shipperley 52'; Butterfield 64'; Johnson 87'	Report	Stewart 51' (pen.); Kyle 85'

Selhurst Park, London
Attendance: 25,287
Referee: Richard Beeby

15 May 2004
12:15

Ipswich Town	1–0	West Ham United
Bent 57'	Report

Portman Road, Ipswich
Attendance: 28,435
Referee: Mark Clattenburg

Second leg

17 May 2004
20:00

Sunderland	2–1 (a.e.t.)	Crystal Palace
Kyle 42'; Stewart 45'	Report	Powell 90'
Penalties
Oster (penalty missed); Smith (penalty scored); Babb (penalty scored); Robinson (penalty scored); Breen (penalty scored); McAteer (penalty missed); Whitley (penalty missed)	4–5	(penalty scored) Johnson; (penalty scored) Freedman; (penalty scored) Shipperley; (penalty scored) Popovic; (penalty missed) Derry; (penalty missed) Routledge; (penalty scored) Hughes

Stadium of Light, Sunderland
Attendance: 34,536
Referee: David Pugh

Sunderland 4–4 Crystal Palace on aggregate. Crystal Palace won 5–4 on penalties.

18 May 2004
19:45

West Ham United	2–0	Ipswich Town
Etherington 50'; Dailly 71'	Report

Upton Park, London
Attendance: 34,002
Referee: Neale Barry

West Ham United won 2–1 on aggregate.

=== Final ===
29 May 2004
15:00

Crystal Palace	1–0	West Ham United
Shipperley 62'	Report

Millennium Stadium, Cardiff
Attendance: 72,523
Referee: Graham Poll

== Second Division ==
Pos	Team	Pld	W	D	L	GF	GA	GD	Pts
3	Bristol City	46	23	13	10	58	37	+21	82
4	Brighton & Hove Albion	46	22	11	13	64	43	+21	77
5	Swindon Town	46	20	13	13	76	58	+18	73
6	Hartlepool United	46	20	13	13	76	61	+15	73

=== Semi-finals ===
First leg

15 May 2004
18:00

Hartlepool United	1–1	Bristol City
Porter 74'	Report	Rougier 5'

Victoria Park, Hartlepool
Attendance: 7,211
Referee: Paul Taylor

16 May 2004
16:00

Swindon Town	0–1	Brighton & Hove Albion
	Report	Carpenter 72'

County Ground, Swindon
Attendance: 14,034
Referee: Neale Barry

Second leg

19 May 2004
19:45

Bristol City	2–1	Hartlepool United
Goodfellow 88'; Roberts 90'	Report	Sweeney 63'

Ashton Gate, Bristol
Attendance: 18,434
Referee: Graham Poll

Bristol City won 3–2 on aggregate.

20 May 2004
19:45

Brighton & Hove Albion	1–2 (a.e.t.)	Swindon Town
Virgo 120'	Report	Parkin 81'; Fallon 97'
Penalties
Carpenter (penalty scored); Iwelumo (penalty scored); Piercy (penalty scored); Virgo (penalty scored)	4–3	(penalty scored) Parkin; (penalty scored) Heywood; (penalty missed) Mooney; (penalty scored) Fallon; (penalty missed) Gurney

Withdean Stadium, Brighton
Attendance: 6,876
Referee: Graham Laws

Brighton & Hove Albion 2–2 Swindon Town on aggregate. Brighton & Hove Albion won 4–3 on penalties.

=== Final ===
30 May 2004
15:00

Brighton & Hove Albion	1–0	Bristol City
Knight 84' (pen.)	Report

Millennium Stadium, Cardiff
Attendance: 65,167
Referee: Richard Beeby

== Third Division ==
Pos	Team	Pld	W	D	L	GF	GA	GD	Pts
4	Huddersfield Town	46	23	11	12	68	52	+16	81
5	Mansfield Town	46	22	9	15	76	62	+14	75
6	Northampton Town	46	22	9	15	58	51	+7	75
7	Lincoln City	46	19	17	10	68	47	+21	74

=== Semi-finals ===
First leg

15 May 2004
15:00

Lincoln City	1–2	Huddersfield Town
Taylor-Fletcher 51'	Report	Onuora 5'; Mirfin 72'

Sincil Bank, Lincoln
Attendance: 9,202
Referee: Graham Laws

16 May 2004
15:00

Northampton Town	0–2	Mansfield Town
	Report	Day 40'; Mendes 67'

Sixfields Stadium, Northampton
Attendance: 6,960
Referee: Mike Jones

Second leg

19 May 2004
19:45

Huddersfield Town	2–2	Lincoln City
Schofield 60' (pen.); Edwards 83'	Report	Butcher 38'; Bailey 39'

Alfred McAlpine Stadium, Huddersfield
Attendance: 19,467
Referee: Mike Pike

Huddersfield Town won 4–3 on aggregate.

20 May 2004
19:45

Mansfield Town	1–3 (a.e.t.)	Northampton Town
Curtis 68'	Report	Richards 36'; Hargreaves 42'; Smith 46'
Penalties
Corden (penalty scored); Lawrence (penalty scored); MacKenzie (penalty scored); D'Jaffo (penalty scored); Larkin (penalty scored)	5–4	(penalty scored) Reeves; (penalty scored) Smith; (penalty scored) Reid; (penalty missed) Sabin; (penalty scored) Willmott

Field Mill, Mansfield
Attendance: 9,243
Referee: Phil Crossley

Mansfield Town 3–3 Northampton Town on aggregate. Mansfield Town won 5–4 on penalties.

=== Final ===
31 May 2004
15:00

Huddersfield Town	0–0 (a.e.t.)	Mansfield Town
	Report
Penalties
Edwards (penalty scored); Schofield (penalty scored); Carss (penalty scored); Fowler (penalty scored)	4–1	(penalty missed) Corden; (penalty missed) Lawrence; (penalty scored) MacKenzie

Millennium Stadium, Cardiff
Attendance: 37,298
Referee: Mark Clattenburg
