= 2007–08 Huddersfield Town A.F.C. season =

Huddersfield Town
2007–08 season
- Chairman: Ken Davy; Dean Hoyle (Chairman-Elect)
- Manager: Andy Ritchie (until 1 April 2008); Gerry Murphy (1 April 2008 until 3 May 2008)
- Stadium: Kirklees Stadium
- League One: 10th
- FA Cup: Fifth round (eliminated by Chelsea)
- League Cup: First round (eliminated by Blackpool)
- League Trophy: First round (eliminated by Grimsby Town)
- Top goalscorer: League: Andy Booth (9); All: Luke Beckett (12)
- Highest home attendance: 16,413 vs Leeds United (15 April 2008)
- Lowest home attendance: 6,004 vs Brighton & Hove Albion (18 March 2008)
- Biggest win: 3–0 vs Grimsby Town (1 December 2007)
- Biggest defeat: 0–4 vs Walsall (6 October 2007); 0–4 vs Leeds United (8 December 2007)
| Home colours | Away colours | Third colours |

Huddersfield Town's 2007–08 campaign saw The Terriers fail to make any progress for a second successive season in Football League One. Andy Ritchie lost his job on April Fool's Day following a 4–1 defeat at local rivals Oldham Athletic. He was replaced by Stan Ternent for the new season.

The season was also notable for 2 other reasons. One was the FA Cup run, which saw Town reach the 5th round for the first time since the 1998–99 season. This included a win over Premier League side Birmingham City and a rematch against Chelsea at Stamford Bridge.

The other big story was the handover of chairmanship from Ken Davy to local businessman Dean Hoyle. He would become the chairman after the centenary season.

== Squad at the start of the season ==
Note: Flags indicate national team as defined under FIFA eligibility rules; some limited exceptions apply. Players may hold more than one non-FIFA nationality.

| No. | Pos. | Nation | Player |
|---|---|---|---|
| 2 | MF | ENG | Andy Holdsworth |
| 3 | DF | ENG | Joe Skarz |
| 4 | MF | IRL | Michael Collins |
| 5 | DF | ENG | David Mirfin |
| 6 | DF | ENG | Nathan Clarke |
| 7 | MF | ENG | Chris Brandon |
| 8 | MF | ENG | Jon Worthington |
| 9 | FW | ENG | Danny Cadamarteri |
| 11 | MF | ENG | Danny Schofield |
| 12 | DF | ENG | Tom Clarke |
| 13 | DF | JAM | Frank Sinclair |
| 15 | MF | SLE | Malvin Kamara |

| No. | Pos. | Nation | Player |
|---|---|---|---|
| 17 | MF | ENG | Matty Young |
| 18 | FW | ENG | Luke Beckett |
| 19 | DF | ENG | Aaron Hardy |
| 20 | MF | ENG | Danny Racchi |
| 21 | FW | ENG | Lucas Akins |
| 22 | MF | IRL | James Berrett |
| 23 | FW | ENG | Andy Booth |
| 24 | MF | ENG | Mitchell Bailey |
| 25 | FW | IRL | Luke Malcher |
| 26 | GK | ENG | Simon Eastwood |
| 27 | GK | ENG | Matt Glennon |
| 28 | GK | ENG | Alex Smithies |

== Review ==
The end of a disappointing season again saw the departure of more players than new arrivals. Senior players who left included Mark Hudson, Martin McIntosh, John McAliskey, Paul Rachubka, and Gary Taylor-Fletcher. Jamaican international defender Frank Sinclair was signed on a 12-month contract, after joining on loan last season, and other close-season signings were ex-Leicester City striker Danny Cadamarteri and midfielder Malvin Kamara, who was released by fellow League One side Port Vale, both on free transfers. Manager Andy Ritchie made ex-Barnsley defender Robbie Williams his fourth signing, on 24 August. Huddersfield Town fan Adam Pearson, former Hull City chairman, tabled a takeover purchase offer for the club during October, worth more than £3 million, but it was rejected. On 10 January 2008, after a successful loan period, Phil Jevons signed from Championship side Bristol City for an undisclosed fee, although it is believed to be in the region of £100,000. On 21 January, Welsh international Rob Page signed from Championship side Coventry City on a deal to the end of the season.

Manager Andy Ritchie departed on 1 April, by 'mutual consent', following the embarrassing 4–1 defeat at rivals Oldham Athletic on 29 March. Academy director Gerry Murphy was put in caretaker charge. First-team coach John Dungworth was the next to go, on 3 April, also announced as by 'mutual consent'. Derby County assistant manager Stan Ternent was appointed as manager at the Galpharm Stadium, on 24 April, with his assistant being ex-Town player Ronnie Jepson. However, Murphy remained in charge of the team for the rest of the season and Ternent will take control of the team at the start of next season. It was announced, on 10 April, that Ken Davy was to step down as chairman after completing a deal with local businessman Dean Hoyle, who will take over at the start of the 2009–10 season. Hoyle joined the board immediately.

On 1 August 2007, Huddersfield won a prestigious pre-season friendly, at home to Premier League side Blackburn Rovers, 2–1 with two Luke Beckett strikes. After a promising start which saw them lying 4th at the start of September, Huddersfield had slumped to 17th by 27 October with five consecutive away defeats, where they failed to score. The team's form continued to be inconsistent, though they had eased up to 13th by the end of 2007, helped by the occasional excellent result notably the 1–0 win at Swansea City on 16 November. From then until the middle of April the team were stuck in the narrow range of 13th–15th. The 2–1 win over Brighton & Hove Albion, on 18 March, was watched by just 6,004 spectators, the lowest ever league crowd at the Galpharm Stadium for a league match. However, following Ritchie's departure, Town regained composure and finished with four consecutive victories including beating local rivals Leeds United 1–0, at the Galpharm, on 15 April. The attendance for that match was 16,413, the highest for a league match for nearly 4 years, apart from the play-off semi-finals. Huddersfield finished the season in 10th place in League One. Although they were 10 points short of a play-off place, at no stage of the season did they look like serious promotion contenders.

In the cups, a League Cup defeat at Blackpool, and an embarrassing 4–1 defeat in the Football League Trophy to Grimsby Town, made it their fourth and fifth consecutive first round cup exits. Huddersfield beat Accrington Stanley away in the first round of the FA Cup, on 10 November. This was followed on 1 December with a second round 3–0 home win over Grimsby Town. Huddersfield caused one of the shocks of the third round when, at home on 5 January 2008, they beat Premier League side Birmingham City 2–1 with goals from Luke Beckett and Chris Brandon. In the fourth round, Town beat fellow League One giant-killers Oldham Athletic (who beat Everton at Goodison Park in Round 3) 1–0 at Boundary Park, thanks to a goal by ex-Oldham striker Luke Beckett. The fifth round draw paired Town with FA Cup holders Chelsea, in a rematch of the third round tie in January 2006. The teams turned round 1–1 after Michael Collins had cancelled out Frank Lampard's 100th Chelsea goal but Lampard and Salomon Kalou sealed Chelsea's 3–1 win.

== Specific events ==
Mark Hudson joined Rotherham United, Martin McIntosh and John McAliskey both joined Mansfield Town, Adnan Ahmed left for Tranmere Rovers, John McCombe signed for Hereford United and James Hand joined Dundalk. Adam Wilson was also told his contract would not be renewed and he subsequently joined non-league team Bradford Park Avenue. In addition, other departures included Paul Rachubka, who was not offered a new deal and subsequently joined Blackpool (where he had spent the end of the 2006–07 season on loan). Gary Taylor-Fletcher joined Rachubka at newly promoted Championship side Blackpool for an undisclosed fee.

Of the other squad members that were out of contract both Danny Racchi and Aaron Hardy were given one-year and six-month deals respectively. Jamaican international defender Frank Sinclair was signed on a 12-month contract at the Galpharm Stadium after a successful loan period. Town's other close-season signings were ex-Leicester City striker Danny Cadamarteri and midfielder Malvin Kamara, who was released by fellow League One side Port Vale, both on a free transfers.

Huddersfield had an offer for Barnsley defender Robbie Williams accepted, with personal terms agreed on 13 July, but the following day during his medical, it was revealed that he had a hairline fracture in his shin, with the deal virtually collapsed, but after being given time to recover he finally signed for the Terriers on 24 August for an undisclosed fee on a three-year deal. Manager Andy Ritchie had previously been unsuccessful in attempts to sign strikers Ian Moore, Jo Kuffour and Jason Scotland.

Town won six of their seven pre-season friendlies including on 1 August 2007 a win 2–1 at home to Premier League side Blackburn Rovers with two Luke Beckett strikes. Recently departed Taylor-Fletcher and Rachubka were given an early chance to face their former club when Town were drawn away to Blackpool in the first round of the League Cup; the game finished 1–0 to the Seasiders thanks to a Ben Burgess goal.

On 31 August, Bristol City and Ireland under-21 international Richard Keogh was signed on a month's loan. His loan was extended by a further month on 1 October. On 27 September, West Bromwich Albion midfielder Ronnie Wallwork was signed on a month's loan to alleviate Town's injury crisis. Huddersfield released Keogh on 29 October but extended Wallwork's loan for another month.

Huddersfield beat Accrington Stanley on 10 November, in the first round of the FA Cup. They came back from 2–0 down thus avoiding their fate of four years previously when they lost 1–0, also in a first round tie away at Accrington.

Huddersfield signed Bristol City striker Phil Jevons for a month's loan on 22 November, as well as increasing Ronnie Wallwork's loan until 29 December. Also that day, young striker Lucas Akins was sent on loan to Conference National side Northwich Victoria.

Akins's loan was extended by another month on 20 December. Then on Christmas Eve, Jevons's loan was extended until 19 January 2008. However, on 10 January Jevons was signed for £100,000, that could double to £200,000 depending on appearances and whether Town win promotion, on a deal that takes him until summer 2010. Ronnie Wallwork returned to West Bromwich Albion on 29 December after the 93-day loan limit expired. On 11 January 2008 it was announced that Wallwork had signed for Sheffield Wednesday, on a free transfer, to the end of the season with a view to a permanent deal.

On 21 January, Welsh international Rob Page signed from Championship side Coventry City on a deal to the end of the season.

On 15 February, Lucas Akins returned from his loan spell at Northwich Victoria and young defender Shane Killock was sent on loan to Conference North side Hyde United. That was later extended to an end-of-season loan. On 21 February, fellow Town youngster Tom Clarke joined West Yorkshire rivals Halifax Town on a month's loan. He returned to the Galpharm on 23 March.

On 28 February, long-serving midfielder Danny Schofield requested that he could leave the club at the end of the season for a new challenge. His name has been circulated to other clubs by manager Andy Ritchie.

On 2 March, Huddersfield won 2 prizes at the 3rd Football League Awards. The club won "Best League One Family Club" for their "Fans of the Future" initiative and Town youngster Daniel Broadbent celebrated his 18th birthday by winning the "League One Apprentice" award, an award won by Joe Skarz twelve months earlier.

By the start of March, Town's play-off hopes were starting to vanish following successive defeats by Gillingham, leaders Swansea City and Swindon Town (who finished the game with nine men!). With Danny Cadamarteri still out injured, Town's three fit strikers: Luke Beckett, Andy Booth and Phil Jevons were all misfiring, so Andy Ritchie tried to bring in an experienced striker from the Championship, but as with back in the summer, he was rejected three times. First by Charlton Athletic's Izale McLeod, then by West Bromwich Albion's Craig Beattie and Crystal Palace's recently transfer-listed Shefki Kuqi. On 11 March, Ritchie revealed he also missed out on Preston North End's Brett Ormerod and Watford's Hungarian striker Tamás Priskin.

On 1 April, three days after a humiliating 4–1 defeat at Oldham Athletic that dashed any lingering play-off hopes, it was announced that manager Andy Ritchie had left the club by mutual consent. First-team coach John Dungworth was the next to go, on 3 April, also announced as by 'mutual consent'. Chairman Ken Davy cited the fact that results had been far too inconsistent and that the club had not moved forward as had been expected. Ritchie had been in charge for slightly less than a year. Davy also stated that the club hoped to appoint a new manager before the end of the season. Academy director Gerry Murphy was put in caretaker charge until a replacement is found. He has ruled himself out of the running for the job. Front-runners include ex-Brentford and Leicester City boss Martin Allen, ex-Town player Mark Lillis and ex-England captain Alan Shearer.

Among Murphy's first acts was to give the Town captaincy to defender Rob Page, so that the previous captain Jon Worthington can focus on his game more. During his tenure as caretaker manager, Murphy led the Terriers to an impressive 1–0 win over local rivals Leeds United.

On 24 April, it was revealed that Town had asked for permission to speak to Derby County assistant manager Stan Ternent, which was granted by Adam Pearson. He took over at the Galpharm Stadium later that day. His assistant is ex-Town player Ronnie Jepson. Derby's own website even said that Chris Hutchings, another person possibly lined up to replace Ritchie would be reunited with Paul Jewell as Ternent's replacement. Ternent will take charge of his first league game at the start of next season.

== Squad at the end of the season ==
Note: Flags indicate national team as defined under FIFA eligibility rules; some limited exceptions apply. Players may hold more than one non-FIFA nationality.

| No. | Pos. | Nation | Player |
|---|---|---|---|
| 2 | MF | ENG | Andy Holdsworth |
| 3 | DF | ENG | Joe Skarz |
| 4 | MF | IRL | Michael Collins |
| 5 | DF | ENG | David Mirfin |
| 6 | DF | ENG | Nathan Clarke |
| 7 | MF | ENG | Chris Brandon |
| 8 | MF | ENG | Jon Worthington |
| 9 | FW | ENG | Danny Cadamarteri |
| 10 | DF | ENG | Robbie Williams |
| 11 | MF | ENG | Danny Schofield |
| 12 | DF | ENG | Tom Clarke |
| 13 | DF | JAM | Frank Sinclair |
| 14 | FW | ENG | Phil Jevons |
| 15 | MF | SLE | Malvin Kamara |
| 17 | MF | ENG | Matty Young |

| No. | Pos. | Nation | Player |
|---|---|---|---|
| 18 | FW | ENG | Luke Beckett |
| 19 | DF | ENG | Aaron Hardy |
| 20 | MF | ENG | Danny Racchi |
| 21 | FW | ENG | Lucas Akins |
| 22 | MF | IRL | James Berrett |
| 23 | FW | ENG | Andy Booth |
| 24 | MF | ENG | Mitchell Bailey |
| 25 | FW | IRL | Luke Malcher |
| 26 | GK | ENG | Simon Eastwood |
| 27 | GK | ENG | Matt Glennon |
| 28 | GK | ENG | Alex Smithies |
| 29 | DF | WAL | Rob Page |
| 31 | DF | ENG | Shane Killock |
| 32 | FW | ENG | Daniel Broadbent |
| 33 | DF | ENG | Spencer Harris |

=== Players in/out ===
==== In ====
| Date | Player | Previous club | Cost |
|---|---|---|---|
| 12 May | (Jamaica) Frank Sinclair | Burnley | Free |
| 1 June | (England) Danny Cadamarteri | Leicester City | Free |
| 18 June | (Sierra Leone) Malvin Kamara | Port Vale | Free |
| 24 August | (England) Robbie Williams | Barnsley | Undisclosed Fee |
| 31 August | (Republic of Ireland) Richard Keogh | Bristol City | Loan |
| 27 September | (England) Ronnie Wallwork | West Bromwich Albion | Loan |
| 22 November | (England) Phil Jevons | Bristol City | Loan |
| 10 January | (England) Phil Jevons | Bristol City | £100K rising to a possible £200K |
| 21 January | (Wales) Rob Page | Coventry City | Free |
| 15 February | (England) Lucas Akins | Northwich Victoria | Return From Loan |
| 23 March | (England) Tom Clarke | Halifax Town | Return From Loan |

==== Out ====
| Date | Player | New Club | Cost |
|---|---|---|---|
| 25 May | (Pakistan) Adnan Ahmed | Tranmere Rovers | Free |
| 5 June | (England) Paul Rachubka | Blackpool | Free |
| 7 June | (Republic of Ireland) John McAliskey | Mansfield Town | Free |
| 14 June | (England) Mark Hudson | Rotherham United | Free |
| 16 June | (Scotland) Martin McIntosh | Mansfield Town | Free |
| 4 July | (England) John McCombe | Hereford United | Free |
| 9 July | (England) Gary Taylor-Fletcher | Blackpool | Undisclosed Fee |
| 10 July | (Republic of Ireland) James Hand | Dundalk | Free |
| 23 July | (England) Adam Wilson | Bradford Park Avenue | Free |
| 29 October | (Republic of Ireland) Richard Keogh | Bristol City | Return From Loan |
| 22 November | (England) Lucas Akins | Northwich Victoria | Loan |
| 29 December | (England) Ronnie Wallwork | West Bromwich Albion | Loan Limit Expired |
| 15 February | (England) Shane Killock | Hyde United | Loan |
| 21 February | (England) Tom Clarke | Halifax Town | Loan |

== Final league table ==
| Pos | Team | Pld | W | D | L | GF | GA | GD | Pts |
|---|---|---|---|---|---|---|---|---|---|
| 8 | Oldham Athletic | 46 | 18 | 13 | 15 | 58 | 45 | +13 | 67 |
| 9 | Northampton Town | 46 | 17 | 15 | 14 | 60 | 55 | +5 | 66 |
| 10 | Huddersfield Town | 46 | 20 | 6 | 20 | 50 | 62 | −12 | 66 |
| 11 | Tranmere Rovers | 46 | 18 | 11 | 17 | 52 | 47 | +5 | 65 |
| 12 | Walsall | 46 | 16 | 16 | 14 | 52 | 46 | +6 | 64 |

Updated to match(es) played on unknown. Source: The Football League
Rules for classification: 1) points; 2) goal difference; 3) number of goals scored.

== Results ==
=== Pre-season matches ===
| Date | Competition | Opponents | Home/ Away | Result F–A | Scorers | Attendance |
|---|---|---|---|---|---|---|
| 18 July 2007 | Friendly match | A.F.C. Emley | A | 3–0 | Cadamarteri [47 (pen)], Beckett [56], Young [83] | 1,985 |
| 21 July 2007 | Friendly match | Bridlington Town | A | 6–1 | Kamara [14, 28], Cadamarteri [24, 38], Beckett [51], Bailey [75] | 684 |
| 24 July 2007 | Friendly match | Hucknall Town | A | 3–1 | Skarz [14], Beckett [40], Schofield [76] | 294 |
| 25 July 2007 | Friendly match | Bradford Park Avenue | A | 1–0 | Booth [21] | 533 |
| 28 July 2007 | Friendly match | Rochdale | A | 0–3 | | 1,421 |
| 1 August 2007 | Friendly match | Blackburn Rovers | H | 2–1 | Beckett [38, 80] | 6,901 |
| 4 August 2007 | Friendly match | Mansfield Town | A | 4–0 | Beckett [24], Collins [38], Akins [60], Kamara [74] | 1,363 |

=== Football League One ===
| Date | Opponents | Home/ Away | Result F–A | Scorers | Attendance | Position |
|---|---|---|---|---|---|---|
| 11 August 2007 | Yeovil Town | H | 1–0 | Beckett [17] | 9,876 | 6th |
| 18 August 2007 | AFC Bournemouth | A | 1–0 | Beckett [43] | 5,606 | 2nd |
| 25 August 2007 | Carlisle United | H | 0–2 | | 10,022 | 7th |
| 1 September 2007 | Millwall | A | 2–1 | Booth [44], Kamara [52] | 9,004 | 4th |
| 8 September 2007 | Crewe Alexandra | A | 0–2 | | 5,164 | 7th |
| 15 September 2007 | Cheltenham Town | H | 2–3 | Kamara [48], Keogh [90] | 8,756 | 9th |
| 22 September 2007 | Northampton Town | A | 0–3 | | 5,014 | 15th |
| 29 September 2007 | Luton Town | H | 2–0 | Beckett [35], Cadamarteri [60] | 9,028 | 9th |
| 2 October 2007 | Nottingham Forest | H | 1–1 | Cadamarteri [67] | 10,994 | 11th |
| 6 October 2007 | Walsall | A | 0–4 | | 5,112 | 14th |
| 14 October 2007 | Doncaster Rovers | A | 0–2 | | 6,866 | 15th |
| 20 October 2007 | Oldham Athletic | H | 1–1 | Wallwork [81] | 10,909 | 16th |
| 26 October 2007 | Tranmere Rovers | A | 0–3 | | 6,008 | 17th |
| 3 November 2007 | Port Vale | H | 3–1 | Booth [3], Wallwork [9], N. Clarke [21] | 8,555 | 17th |
| 6 November 2007 | Hartlepool United | H | 2–0 | Cadamarteri [12], Beckett [87] | 8,154 | 14th |
| 16 November 2007 | Swansea City | A | 1–0 | Kamara [54] | 12,184 | 9th |
| 24 November 2007 | Leyton Orient | H | 0–1 | | 9,697 | 13th |
| 5 December 2007 | Southend United | A | 1–4 | Schofield [67] | 6,844 | 15th |
| 8 December 2007 | Leeds United | A | 0–4 | | 32,501 | 15th |
| 15 December 2007 | Bristol Rovers | H | 2–1 | Wallwork [16], Jevons [55] | 8,118 | 13th |
| 22 December 2007 | Cheltenham Town | A | 2–0 | Booth [14, 66] | 3,998 | 11th |
| 26 December 2007 | Crewe Alexandra | H | 1–1 | Booth [84] | 9,759 | 12th |
| 29 December 2007 | Northampton Town | H | 1–2 | Booth [45] | 8,556 | 13th |
| 1 January 2008 | Nottingham Forest | A | 1–2 | Jevons [37 (pen)] | 18,762 | 14th |
| 12 January 2008 | Gillingham | H | 1–3 | Brandon [31] | 11,212 | 16th |
| 19 January 2008 | Brighton & Hove Albion | A | 1–1 | Williams [77] | 5,343 | 15th |
| 29 January 2008 | AFC Bournemouth | H | 1–0 | Jevons [35] | 7,359 | 15th |
| 2 February 2008 | Yeovil Town | A | 2–0 | Beckett [25 (pen)], Collins [51] | 4,823 | 15th |
| 9 February 2008 | Swindon Town | H | 1–0 | Jevons [1] | 9,388 | 13th |
| 12 February 2008 | Carlisle United | A | 1–2 | Page [87] | 6,196 | 15th |
| 19 February 2008 | Millwall | H | 1–0 | Beckett [29 (pen)] | 6,326 | 13th |
| 23 February 2008 | Gillingham | A | 0–1 | | 5,022 | 14th |
| 1 March 2008 | Swansea City | H | 0–1 | | 10,471 | 15th |
| 4 March 2008 | Swindon Town | A | 2–3 | Jevons [39 (pen), 77 (pen)] | 4,840 | 16th |
| 8 March 2008 | Leyton Orient | A | 1–0 | Beckett [75] | 4,660 | 15th |
| 11 March 2008 | Hartlepool United | A | 1–2 | N. Clarke [64] | 3,650 | 15th |
| 15 March 2008 | Southend United | H | 1–2 | Booth [73] | 7,823 | 15th |
| 18 March 2008 | Brighton & Hove Albion | H | 2–1 | Holdsworth [4], Beckett [79 (pen)] | 6,004 | 14th |
| 22 March 2008 | Bristol Rovers | A | 3–2 | Berrett [39], Brandon [70], Collins [88] | 6,585 | 13th |
| 29 March 2008 | Oldham Athletic | A | 1–4 | Mirfin [90] | 5,637 | 14th |
| 5 April 2008 | Doncaster Rovers | H | 2–2 | Williams [7], Holdsworth [61] | 10,279 | 14th |
| 12 April 2008 | Port Vale | A | 0–0 | | 4,150 | 13th |
| 15 April 2008 | Leeds United | H | 1–0 | Holdsworth [76] | 16,413 | 12th |
| 19 April 2008 | Tranmere Rovers | H | 1–0 | Booth [61] | 8,315 | 12th |
| 26 April 2008 | Walsall | H | 2–0 | Schofield [41], Booth [56] | 9,969 | 12th |
| 3 May 2008 | Luton Town | A | 1–0 | Jevons [77] | 6,539 | 10th |

=== FA Cup ===
| Date | Round | Opponents | Home/ Away | Result F–A | Scorers | Attendance |
|---|---|---|---|---|---|---|
| 10 November 2007 | Round 1 | Accrington Stanley | A | 3–2 | Kamara [45, 83], Beckett [89] | 2,202 |
| 1 December 2007 | Round 2 | Grimsby Town | H | 3–0 | Jevons [53, 62], Beckett [85] | 6,729 |
| 5 January 2008 | Round 3 | Birmingham City | H | 2–1 | Beckett [4], Brandon [81] | 13,410 |
| 26 January 2008 | Round 4 | Oldham Athletic | A | 1–0 | Beckett [10] | 12,749 |
| 16 February 2008 | Round 5 | Chelsea | A | 1–3 | Collins [45] | 41,324 |

=== Football League Cup ===
| Date | Round | Opponents | Home/ Away | Result F–A | Scorers | Attendance |
|---|---|---|---|---|---|---|
| 14 August 2007 | Round 1 | Blackpool | A | 0–1 | | 6,395 |

=== League Trophy ===
| Date | Round | Opponents | Home/ Away | Result F–A | Scorers | Attendance |
|---|---|---|---|---|---|---|
| 4 September 2007 | Round 1 North East | Grimsby Town | A | 1–4 | Collins [45] | 1,204 |

== Appearances and goals ==
| Squad No. | Name | Nationality | Position | League | | FA Cup | | League Cup | | Football League Trophy | | Total | |
| Squad No. | Name | Nationality | Position | Apps | Goals | Apps | Goals | Apps | Goals | Apps | Goals | Apps | Goals |
|---|---|---|---|---|---|---|---|---|---|---|---|---|---|
| 2 | Andy Holdsworth | England | DF | 43 (1) | 3 | 5 | 0 | 0 | 0 | 1 | 0 | 49 (1) | 3 |
| 3 | Joe Skarz | England | DF | 22 (5) | 0 | 2 (1) | 0 | 1 | 0 | 1 | 0 | 26 (6) | 0 |
| 4 | Michael Collins | Republic of Ireland | MF | 35 (6) | 2 | 3 (2) | 1 | 1 | 0 | 1 | 1 | 40 (8) | 4 |
| 5 | David Mirfin | England | DF | 23 (6) | 1 | 3 (1) | 0 | 1 | 0 | 0 | 0 | 27 (7) | 1 |
| 6 | Nathan Clarke | England | DF | 44 | 2 | 4 | 0 | 1 | 0 | 1 | 0 | 50 | 2 |
| 7 | Chris Brandon | England | MF | 25 (3) | 2 | 2 | 1 | 1 | 0 | 1 | 0 | 29 (3) | 3 |
| 8 | Jon Worthington | England | MF | 19 (6) | 0 | 1 | 0 | 1 | 0 | 0 | 0 | 21 (6) | 0 |
| 9 | Danny Cadamarteri | England | FW | 10 (2) | 3 | 1 (1) | 0 | 0 | 0 | 0 | 0 | 11 (3) | 3 |
| 10 | Robbie Williams | England | DF | 24 (1) | 2 | 3 | 0 | 0 | 0 | 0 | 0 | 27 (1) | 2 |
| 11 | Danny Schofield | England | MF | 19 (6) | 2 | 4 (1) | 0 | 1 | 0 | 1 | 0 | 25 (7) | 2 |
| 12 | Tom Clarke | England | DF | 2 (1) | 0 | 0 | 0 | 0 | 0 | 0 (1) | 0 | 2 (2) | 0 |
| 13 | Frank Sinclair | Jamaica | DF | 28 (1) | 0 | 5 | 0 | 1 | 0 | 0 | 0 | 34 (1) | 0 |
| 14 | Phil Jevons | England | FW | 17 (4) | 7 | 3 (1) | 2 | 0 | 0 | 0 | 0 | 20 (5) | 9 |
| 14 | Richard Keogh | Republic of Ireland | DF | 9 | 1 | 0 | 0 | 0 | 0 | 1 | 0 | 10 | 1 |
| 15 | Malvin Kamara | Sierra Leone | MF | 33 (10) | 3 | 3 (2) | 2 | 1 | 0 | 1 | 0 | 38 (12) | 5 |
| 16 | Ronnie Wallwork | England | MF | 16 | 3 | 2 | 0 | 0 | 0 | 0 | 0 | 18 | 3 |
| 17 | Matty Young | England | MF | 4 (4) | 0 | 0 | 0 | 0 | 0 | 0 (1) | 0 | 4 (5) | 0 |
| 18 | Luke Beckett | England | FW | 25 (11) | 8 | 3 (2) | 4 | 1 | 0 | 1 | 0 | 30 (13) | 12 |
| 19 | Aaron Hardy | England | DF | 5 (1) | 0 | 0 | 0 | 0 (1) | 0 | 1 | 0 | 6 (2) | 0 |
| 20 | Danny Racchi | England | DF | 0 (3) | 0 | 0 | 0 | 0 | 0 | 0 | 0 | 0 (3) | 0 |
| 21 | Lucas Akins | England | FW | 0 (3) | 0 | 0 | 0 | 0 | 0 | 0 (1) | 0 | 0 (4) | 0 |
| 22 | James Berrett | Republic of Ireland | MF | 10 (5) | 1 | 2 | 0 | 0 | 0 | 0 | 0 | 12 (5) | 1 |
| 23 | Andy Booth | England | FW | 28 (10) | 9 | 2 (1) | 0 | 0 (1) | 0 | 0 | 0 | 30 (12) | 9 |
| 27 | Matt Glennon | England | GK | 45 | 0 | 5 | 0 | 1 | 0 | 1 | 0 | 52 | 0 |
| 28 | Alex Smithies | England | GK | 1 (1) | 0 | 0 | 0 | 0 | 0 | 0 | 0 | 1 (1) | 0 |
| 29 | Rob Page | Wales | DF | 18 | 1 | 2 | 0 | 0 | 0 | 0 | 0 | 20 | 1 |
| 31 | Shane Killock | England | DF | 1 | 0 | 0 | 0 | 0 | 0 | 0 | 0 | 1 | 0 |
| 32 | Daniel Broadbent | England | FW | 0 (5) | 0 | 0 | 0 | 0 | 0 | 0 | 0 | 0 (5) | 0 |
