= 2006–07 Huddersfield Town A.F.C. season =

Huddersfield Town
2006–07 season
- Chairman: Ken Davy
- Manager: Peter Jackson (until 6 March); Gerry Murphy (caretaker, until 11 April); Andy Ritchie (from 11 April)
- Stadium: Kirklees Stadium
- League One: 15th
- FA Cup: First round (eliminated by Blackpool)
- League Cup: First round (eliminated by Mansfield Town)
- League Trophy: First round (eliminated by Doncaster Rovers)
- Top goalscorer: League: Luke Beckett (15); All: Luke Beckett (15)
- Highest home attendance: 14,772 vs Bradford City (10 March 2007)
- Lowest home attendance: 3,629 vs Doncaster Rovers (17 October 2006)
- Biggest win: 3–0 vs Rotherham United (8 August 2006)
- Biggest defeat: 1–5 vs Nottingham Forest (3 March 2007)
Home colours	Away colours

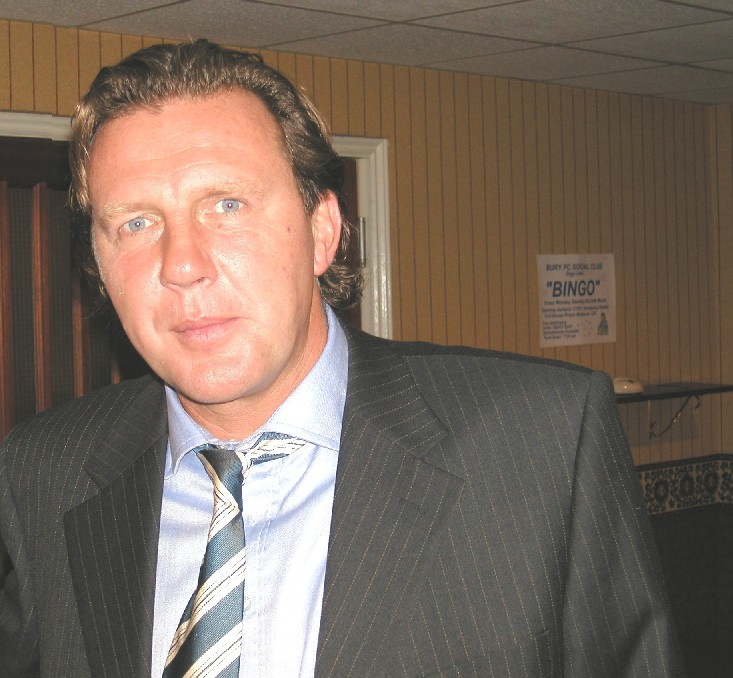
Peter Jackson's contract as manager was terminated on 6 March 2007

Huddersfield Town's 2006–07 campaign saw Town fail to make any progress in Football League One, which subsequently saw Peter Jackson lose his job in March, being replaced by Andy Ritchie the following month. The irony of his appointment being that it was Ritchie's Barnsley side who stopped Jackson's Terriers from reaching the play-off final the previous season.

== Squad at the start of the season ==
Note: Flags indicate national team as defined under FIFA eligibility rules; some limited exceptions apply. Players may hold more than one non-FIFA nationality.

No.	Pos.	Nation	Player
1	GK	ENG	Paul Rachubka
2	DF	ENG	Andy Holdsworth
3	DF	ENG	Danny Adams
4	MF	ENG	Mark Hudson
5	DF	ENG	David Mirfin
6	DF	ENG	Nathan Clarke
7	MF	ENG	Chris Brandon
8	MF	ENG	Jon Worthington (captain)
9	FW	POL	Paweł Abbott
10	FW	ENG	Gary Taylor-Fletcher
11	MF	ENG	Danny Schofield

No.	Pos.	Nation	Player
12	MF	PAK	Adnan Ahmed
14	DF	ENG	Tom Clarke
15	FW	IRL	John McAliskey
16	DF	SCO	Martin McIntosh
17	DF	ENG	John McCombe
18	FW	ENG	Luke Beckett
19	MF	IRL	Michael Collins
21	DF	ENG	Aaron Hardy
22	MF	ENG	Matty Young
23	FW	ENG	Andy Booth
27	GK	ENG	Matt Glennon

== Review ==
Following the narrow play-off defeat in May 2006 to neighbours Barnsley, the 2006–07 season started with high hopes that this would be the year that Huddersfield Town would make the step up to the Championship. Peter Jackson showed his confidence by extending his contract until May 2009. Notwithstanding the arrival of Luke Beckett departures, including Junior Mendes, exceeded arrivals.

The team made a sound start, with an encouraging home draw with much fancied Nottingham Forest, and they peaked at 5th on 21 October 2006. Some of the results in that period flattered the performances and the wheels came off in the next game with a 3–0 loss to Brighton & Hove Albion.

Despite an offer of cash from the Board, Peter Jackson declined to take any players on loan and the team spiralled downwards. Elimination, at home, in the first round of all three cup competitions did nothing to lift the gloom and on 5 January, in the televised encounter at Yeovil Town, the team played perhaps the worst 45 minutes of football in recent seasons to go 3–0 down at half-time (the game finished 3–1).

Around the January transfer window, Paweł Abbott and Danny Adams left, with Jackson indicating that Martin McIntosh and Mark Hudson would not play for the Club again, while Andy Taylor joined from Blackburn Rovers on loan until 5 April 2007, and Frank Sinclair joined from Burnley for the rest of the season. Also signed on a loan deal, on 23 February, was Barnsley striker Paul Hayes who played four games before his return.

A 5–1 thrashing at Nottingham Forest, on 3 March, lead directly to the departure of Peter Jackson on 6 March 2007, according to a Board statement, "due to our form and the inability to attract key players".

Academy Director Gerry Murphy was appointed caretaker manager, one of whose first acts was to bring Martin McIntosh and Mark Hudson back into the reckoning, and Huddersfield went unbeaten in the first five games with Murphy in charge until they lost 2–0 at home to Blackpool on 9 April 2007, his last game as manager.

On 4 April 2007, a press conference was scheduled to announce the appointment of Charlton Athletic's assistant manager Phil Parkinson as the new manager. However he telephoned the club, just over an hour before the press conference was due to begin, to reveal that he was staying with Charlton Athletic. Andy Ritchie was then appointed Huddersfield Town manager on 11 April 2007 on a two-year contract.

On 17 April, it was announced that Huddersfield Town's sponsors, Yorkshire Building Society and kit suppliers Admiral would be replaced. The new kit supplier was Huddersfield based Mitre and the new sponsors were Gibraltar based gambling outfit CasinoRed.com, who were given a contract for 12 months with an option to extend for a further two years.

Also on 17 April, Gerry Murphy, was promoted to a new position as Director of Football Development where he would be in overall control of scouting as well as his existing duties as Academy Director.

On 5 May, it was announced that six of Town's second-year scholars were offered professional contracts. They were Joe Skarz (who had already signed his), Luke Malcher, Simon Eastwood, James Berrett, Mitchell Bailey, and Lucas Akins, who had already been offered a new professional contract. Fellow youngster Alex Hallam was released.

Ritchie was in charge for the final four matches of the season with the team collecting seven points out of 12. The team finished the season in 15th position with 59 points, 16 points below the play-off places but 12 points above the relegation positions.

== Events ==
Peter Jackson signed a two-year extension to his contract, on 18 May 2006, that will see him managing Town until May 2009. Then on 27 June 2006 he made his first summer signing by snapping up 27-year-old goalkeeper Matt Glennon from St Johnstone on a free. On 29 June 2006, Junior Mendes moved to Notts County while Phil Senior went to Northwich Victoria on 30 June, both also without a fee.

3 July 2006 saw Huddersfield sign 29-year-old Sheffield United striker Luke Beckett, for £85,000, on a three-year deal. Beckett scored six goals in seven games for Huddersfield during a loan spell in 2005.

On 8 August 2006, Gary Taylor-Fletcher scored the 500,000th goal in English league football, with a fierce 25-yard drive that nestled into the top-left corner, to lead the Terriers to a 3–0 home victory over Rotherham United.

Peter Jackson was sent to the stands, on 12 August 2006, after grabbing Bristol City's Lee Johnson around the throat in a touchline altercation 10 minutes from time in Huddersfield's 2–1 win over Bristol City. On 30 August 2006 The F.A. charged Jackson with improper conduct over the incident and he was fined £300.

From 18 August 2006, Martin McIntosh went on a month's loan to Grimsby Town but regained his place immediately on his return. On the same date, Gary Taylor-Fletcher signed a two-year contract extension which keeps him at the club until the end of the 2008–09 season, following closely on David Mirfin signing an identical contract extension.

John McAliskey was loaned to Wrexham for a month on 19 September 2006.

On 21 December, Terry Yorath quit his role as assistant manager, partially down to his three-month illness of pancreatitis. He was replaced by first team coach John Dungworth, who had been covering him in his absence.

Paul Rachubka was taken on loan to Peterborough United as cover for Mark Tyler and played four League 2 matches over Christmas/New Year 2006–07.

Peter Jackson was again sent to the stands in the Terriers' 3–2 victory over Swansea City, on 30 December 2006, for aggressively protesting a throw-in decision that lead to Swansea's second goal but the F.A. decided to take no action.

In January 2007 Danny Adams and Martin McIntosh were informed that their contracts would not be renewed in the summer and were transfer listed along with Paweł Abbott. Also in January, Adnan Ahmed went to Lincoln City on a one-week trial.

On 13 January 2007, Peter Jackson announced that Joe Skarz would be the first choice left-back in preference to Danny Adams, who left the club on 23 January 2007 when his contract was cancelled 'by mutual consent'.

On 22 January 2007, Pawel Abbott signed for Swansea on a two-and-a-half-year deal for a transfer fee reported to be in the region of £150,000.

Then, on 25 January it was announced that midfielder, Mark Hudson, would be transfer listed.

On 31 January 2007, as the transfer window started to close, Blackburn Rovers defender Andy Taylor was signed on loan by manager Peter Jackson. On the same date Paul Rachubka went on loan to Blackpool until the end of the season.

In early February, Frank Sinclair joined from Burnley for the rest of the season with a view to a longer deal.

On 6 March 2007, it was announced by Huddersfield Town that Peter Jackson had left the club with his contract cancelled by mutual consent. Jackson's last game in charge was a dismal 5–1 defeat to Nottingham Forest on 3 March 2007. A statement from the board said: "The Board's clearly stated minimum aim at the start of the season was to achieve a Play-Off position, but unfortunately due to our form and the inability to attract key players, this objective is now looking remote." Academy Director Gerry Murphy was appointed caretaker manager, while a lengthy selection process was put in train, and one of his first acts was to bring Martin McIntosh and Mark Hudson back into the reckoning.

On 15 March, John McCombe joined Boston United on loan, but was recalled on 23 March, without making a single appearance for Boston. Then on 21 March, Chris Brandon joined Paul Rachubka on loan at Blackpool. The following day, Paul Hayes returned to Barnsley.

On 31 March, Hudson and McIntosh were both in the starting line up for the match against Port Vale which ended 2–2. John McAliskey scored his first goal of the season and his first for nearly 2½ years. Andy Taylor was recalled by Blackburn Rovers on 5 April 2007.

The selection process for the new manager was accident prone. Kevin Blackwell pulled out to take the Luton Town manager's position on 27 March 2007, the day that he was due to be interviewed, then on 4 April 2007 a press conference was scheduled to announce the appointment of Phil Parkinson as the new manager. However he telephoned the club, just over an hour before the press conference was due to begin, to reveal that he was staying with Charlton Athletic. It was widely reported on Bank Holiday Monday that Andy Ritchie was to be appointed Huddersfield Town manager, but it was not officially announced until 11 April 2007, and he will be on a two-year contract.

== Squad at the end of the season ==
Note: Flags indicate national team as defined under FIFA eligibility rules; some limited exceptions apply. Players may hold more than one non-FIFA nationality.

No.	Pos.	Nation	Player
1	GK	ENG	Paul Rachubka (on loan at Blackpool)
2	DF	ENG	Andy Holdsworth
4	MF	ENG	Mark Hudson
5	DF	ENG	David Mirfin
6	DF	ENG	Nathan Clarke
7	MF	ENG	Chris Brandon (on loan at Blackpool)
8	MF	ENG	Jon Worthington (Captain)
10	FW	ENG	Gary Taylor-Fletcher
11	MF	ENG	Danny Schofield
12	MF	PAK	Adnan Ahmed
13	DF	JAM	Frank Sinclair (on loan from Burnley)
14	DF	ENG	Tom Clarke
15	FW	IRL	John McAliskey
16	DF	SCO	Martin McIntosh
17	DF	ENG	John McCombe
18	FW	ENG	Luke Beckett

No.	Pos.	Nation	Player
19	MF	IRL	Michael Collins
20	MF	ENG	Danny Racchi
21	DF	ENG	Aaron Hardy
22	MF	ENG	Matty Young
23	FW	ENG	Andy Booth
24	DF	ENG	Adam Wilson
25	MF	IRL	James Berrett
26	GK	ENG	Simon Eastwood
27	GK	ENG	Matt Glennon
30	MF	IRL	James Hand
31	DF	ENG	Joe Skarz
32	FW	ENG	Lucas Akins
33	MF	ENG	Mitchell Bailey
34	MF	ENG	Alex Hallam
35	GK	ENG	Alex Smithies
36	FW	IRL	Luke Malcher

== Final league table ==
Pos	Team	Pld	W	D	L	GF	GA	GD	Pts
13	Crewe Alexandra	46	17	9	20	66	72	−6	60
14	Northampton Town	46	15	14	17	48	51	−3	59
15	Huddersfield Town	46	14	17	15	60	69	−9	59
16	Gillingham	46	17	8	21	56	77	−21	59
17	Cheltenham Town	46	15	9	22	49	61	−12	54

Rules for classification: In the Football League goals scored (GF) takes precedence over goal difference (GD).

== Results ==
=== Pre-season matches ===
Date	Competition	Opponents	Home/Away	Result F–A	Scorers	Attendance
11 July 2006	Friendly match	A.F.C. Emley	A	3–0	Booth [22], McAliskey [33], Collins [90]	1,280
13 July 2006	Friendly match	Harrogate Town	A	1–1	Beckett [83]	409
17 July 2006	Copa Ibiza	Ibiza Select XI	N (San Antonio)	1–2	Taylor-Fletcher [45]	?
20 July 2006	Copa Ibiza	Swindon Town	N (San Antonio)	1–0	Brandon [58]	?
25 July 2006	Andy Booth Testimonial Match	Real Sociedad	H	0–0		7,142
27 July 2006	Friendly match	Ossett Albion	A	1–0	Abbott [39]	?
29 July 2006	Friendly match	Chester City	A	0–0		1,669

=== Football League One ===
Date	Opponents	Home/Away	Result F–A	Scorers	Attendance	League position
5 August 2006	Gillingham	A	1–2	Taylor-Fletcher [81]	6,075	15th
8 August 2006	Rotherham United	H	3–0	Beckett [36 (pen)], Abbott [45], Taylor-Fletcher [78]	10,161	7th
12 August 2006	Bristol City	H	2–1	Beckett [64], Abbott [90]	10,492	6th
19 August 2006	Brentford	A	2–2	Schofield [72], Beckett [90]	5,709	6th
26 August 2006	Nottingham Forest	H	1–1	Taylor-Fletcher [72]	11,720	7th
2 September 2006	Crewe Alexandra	A	0–2		4,868	10th
9 September 2006	Cheltenham Town	A	1–2	Abbott [86]	3,720	14th
12 September 2006	Doncaster Rovers	H	0–0		10,151	18th
16 September 2006	Yeovil Town	H	2–3	Hudson [27], Taylor-Fletcher [63]	9,573	19th
23 September 2006	Swansea City	A	2–1	Taylor-Fletcher [50, 60]	12,202	17th
26 September 2006	Tranmere Rovers	A	2–2	Booth [55], Taylor-Fletcher [78]	6,702	18th
30 September 2006	Bournemouth	H	2–2	Taylor-Fletcher [27], Beckett [69]	11,350	17th
7 October 2006	Bradford City	A	1–0	Hudson [25]	14,925	13th
14 October 2006	Carlisle United	H	2–1	Beckett [21, 32 (pen)]	10,830	11th
21 October 2006	Port Vale	A	2–1	Booth [77], Collins [79]	5,225	5th
28 October 2006	Brighton & Hove Albion	H	0–3		10,616	9th
4 November 2006	Scunthorpe United	H	1–1	Booth [86]	10,456	9th
18 November 2006	Blackpool	A	1–3	Taylor-Fletcher [45]	7,414	11th
25 November 2006	Oldham Athletic	H	0–3		13,280	14th
5 December 2006	Millwall	A	0–0		6,251	16th
9 December 2006	Leyton Orient	A	0–1		4,300	17th
16 December 2006	Northampton Town	H	1–1	Schofield [65]	8,723	17th
23 December 2006	Chesterfield	A	0–0		4,472	17th
26 December 2006	Tranmere Rovers	H	2–2	Booth [9], Schofield [60 (pen)]	10,228	17th
30 December 2006	Swansea City	H	3–2	Worthington [67], Abbott [75, 90 (pen)]	9,399	14th
1 January 2007	Doncaster Rovers	A	0–3		14,470	16th
5 January 2007	Yeovil Town	A	1–3	Taylor-Fletcher [50]	5,554	16th
13 January 2007	Cheltenham Town	H	2–0	Beckett [31], Booth [43]	9,813	14th
20 January 2007	Bournemouth	A	2–1	Worthington [12], Schofield [85]	5,263	11th
27 January 2007	Chesterfield	H	1–1	Young [53]	9,872	11th
3 February 2007	Gillingham	H	3–1	Beckett [3], Booth [8, 83]	9,167	11th
10 February 2007	Bristol City	A	1–1	Taylor-Fletcher [52]	11,636	11th
17 February 2007	Brentford	H	0–2		10,520	13th
20 February 2007	Rotherham United	A	3–2	Beckett [3, 46], Collins [59]	4,448	12th
24 February 2007	Crewe Alexandra	H	1–2	Brandon [22]	10,052	13th
3 March 2007	Nottingham Forest	A	1–5	Young [82]	19,070	15th
10 March 2007	Bradford City	H	2–0	Hayes [3], Schofield [75]	14,772	14th
17 March 2007	Carlisle United	A	1–1	Beckett [26]	6,629	14th
24 March 2007	Brighton & Hove Albion	A	0–0		5,974	14th
31 March 2007	Port Vale	H	2–2	Beckett [4], McAliskey [46]	10,313	15th
7 April 2007	Oldham Athletic	A	1–1	Beckett [78]	7,096	15th
9 April 2007	Blackpool	H	0–2		11,432	16th
14 April 2007	Scunthorpe United	A	0–2		7,518	17th
21 April 2007	Millwall	H	4–2	Collins [20], Hudson [59], Beckett [73 (pen), 79]	9,406	16th
27 April 2007	Northampton Town	A	1–1	Mirfin [75]	5,842	16th
5 May 2007	Leyton Orient	H	3–1	Collins [11], Holdsworth [26, 45]	10,842	15th

=== FA Cup ===
Date	Round	Opponents	Home/Away	Result F–A	Scorers	Attendance
11 November 2006	Round 1	Blackpool	H	0–1		6,597

=== League Cup ===
Date	Round	Opponents	Home/Away	Result F–A	Scorers	Attendance
22 August 2006	Round 1	Mansfield Town	H	0–2		5,111

=== Football League Trophy ===
Date	Round	Opponents	Home/Away	Result F–A	Scorers	Attendance
17 October 2006	Round 1 North East	Doncaster Rovers	H	1–2	Booth [61]	3,629

== Appearances and goals ==
Squad No.	Name	Nationality	Position	League		FA Cup		League Cup		Football League Trophy		Total	
Squad No.	Name	Nationality	Position	Apps	Goals	Apps	Goals	Apps	Goals	Apps	Goals	Apps	Goals
1	Paul Rachubka	England	GK	0	0	0	0	0	0	0 (1)	0	0 (1)	0
2	Andy Holdsworth	England	DF	35	2	1	0	1	0	0	0	37	2
3	Danny Adams	England	DF	23	0	0	0	1	0	1	0	25	0
3	Andy Taylor	England	DF	7 (1)	0	0	0	0	0	0	0	7 (1)	0
4	Mark Hudson	England	MF	30 (1)	3	1	0	1	0	0	0	32 (1)	3
5	David Mirfin	England	DF	38	1	0	0	1	0	0	0	39	1
6	Nathan Clarke	England	DF	16	0	1	0	1	0	1	0	19	0
7	Chris Brandon	England	MF	17 (6)	1	0	0	0	0	1	0	18 (6)	1
8	Jon Worthington	England	MF	27 (1)	2	1	0	0	0	1	0	29 (1)	2
9	Pawel Abbott	Poland	FW	8 (10)	5	0	0	1	0	1	0	10 (10)	5
9	Paul Hayes	England	FW	4	1	0	0	0	0	0	0	4	1
10	Gary Taylor-Fletcher	England	FW	39	11	1	0	1	0	0	0	41	11
11	Danny Schofield	England	MF	25 (10)	5	1	0	1	0	1	0	28 (10)	5
12	Adnan Ahmed	Pakistan	MF	4 (5)	0	0	0	0	0	1	0	5 (5)	0
13	Frank Sinclair	Jamaica	DF	13	0	0	0	0	0	0	0	13	0
14	Tom Clarke	England	DF	6 (3)	0	0	0	0	0	0	0	6 (3)	0
15	John McAliskey	Republic of Ireland	FW	4 (5)	1	0	0	0	0	0	0	4 (5)	1
16	Martin McIntosh	Scotland	DF	23 (2)	0	0	0	0	0	0	0	23 (2)	0
17	John McCombe	England	DF	5 (2)	0	1	0	0	0	1	0	7 (2)	0
18	Luke Beckett	England	FW	32 (9)	15	0 (1)	0	1	0	0	0	33 (10)	15
19	Michael Collins	Republic of Ireland	MF	39 (4)	4	1	0	1	0	0 (1)	0	41 (5)	4
20	Danny Racchi	England	DF	0 (3)	0	0	0	0	0	0	0	0 (3)	0
21	Aaron Hardy	England	DF	5 (4)	0	0	0	0	0	1	0	6 (4)	0
22	Matty Young	England	MF	16 (13)	2	0 (1)	0	0	0	0	0	16 (14)	2
23	Andy Booth	England	FW	29 (5)	7	1	0	0 (1)	0	1	1	31 (6)	8
25	James Berrett	Republic of Ireland	MF	0 (2)	0	0	0	0	0	0	0	0 (2)	0
27	Matt Glennon	England	GK	46	0	1	0	1	0	1	0	49	0
30	James Hand	Republic of Ireland	MF	0 (1)	0	0	0	0	0	0	0	0 (1)	0
31	Joe Skarz	England	DF	15 (2)	0	1	0	0	0	0	0	16 (2)	0
32	Lucas Akins	England	FW	0 (2)	0	0	0	0	0	0	0	0 (2)	0
