= 2005–06 Huddersfield Town A.F.C. season =

Huddersfield Town
2005–06 season
- Chairman: Ken Davy
- Manager: Peter Jackson
- Stadium: Kirklees Stadium
- League One: 4th
- Play-offs: Semi-finals (eliminated by Barnsley)
- FA Cup: Third round (eliminated by Chelsea)
- League Cup: Second round (eliminated by Blackburn Rovers)
- League Trophy: First round (eliminated by Boston United)
- Top goalscorer: League: Andy Booth (13); All: Andy Booth; Gary Taylor-Fletcher (15 each)
- Highest home attendance: 19,223 vs. Barnsley (16 May 2006)
- Lowest home attendance: 5,518 vs. Welling United (6 November 2005)
- Biggest win: 5–0 vs Milton Keynes Dons (18 February 2006)
- Biggest defeat: 1–4 vs Scunthorpe United (2 September 2005); 0–3 vs Port Vale (28 December 2005)
Home colours	Away colours	Third colours

The 2005–06 season of Huddersfield Town A.F.C. was their second competitive campaign in the restructured Football League One. They finished in 4th place, qualifying them for the play-offs, but, after beating Barnsley 1–0 in the first leg at Oakwell, they lost the second leg 3–1 at the Galpharm Stadium, to lose 3–2 on aggregate.

Their season was also noted for their cup campaigns in the Football League Cup and FA Cup. They managed a respectable 3–1 loss to Blackburn Rovers at Ewood Park, where around half of the 12,000 crowd were Town fans. Then in the FA Cup, the Terriers were 8 minutes away from forcing a replay against José Mourinho's Chelsea, before succumbing to a goal by Eiður Guðjohnsen.

== Squad at the start of the season ==
Note: Flags indicate national team as defined under FIFA eligibility rules; some limited exceptions apply. Players may hold more than one non-FIFA nationality.

No.	Pos.	Nation	Player
1	GK	ENG	Paul Rachubka
2	DF	ENG	Andy Holdsworth
3	DF	ENG	Danny Adams
4	MF	ENG	Mark Hudson
5	DF	ENG	David Mirfin
6	DF	ENG	Nathan Clarke
7	MF	ENG	Chris Brandon
8	MF	ENG	Tony Carss
9	FW	POL	Paweł Abbott
10	FW	ENG	Gary Taylor-Fletcher
11	MF	ENG	Danny Schofield
12	MF	PAK	Adnan Ahmed
14	DF	ENG	Tom Clarke

No.	Pos.	Nation	Player
15	FW	IRL	John McAliskey
16	DF	SCO	Martin McIntosh
17	DF	ENG	John McCombe
18	MF	ENG	Jon Worthington (Captain)
19	DF	ENG	Anthony Lloyd
20	FW	MSR	Junior Mendes
21	MF	WAL	Lee Fowler
22	GK	ENG	Phil Senior
23	FW	ENG	Andy Booth
24	MF	IRL	Michael Collins
25	MF	ENG	Matty Young
26	DF	ENG	Aaron Hardy

== Review ==
Controversial 'Young Guns' campaign

Before the start of the season 2005–06, the club launched the controversial 'Young Guns' campaign. The players, manager Peter Jackson, assistant manager Terry Yorath, and coach Martyn Booty posed for the 2006 calendar in cowboy outfits. Six of the younger players featured on the cover of the corporate hospitality brochure. Basing the cover around the 'Young Guns' theme was widely considered to be a mistake and caused the booklet to be adversely linked with the Brokeback Mountain film.

Despite losing to Nottingham Forest on the opening day of the season, Huddersfield started the 2005–06 season brightly and were top of the table by mid-October. During the season they got the chance to show their pedigree by playing at Blackburn Rovers in the League Cup, which they lost 3–1.

They also had a big money-spinning FA Cup match at Chelsea in January. While they performed well, only losing 2–1, but many predicted it could be the turning point in Town's season, as they hadn't won a game since being drawn against them, a month earlier.

Gerry Murphy won the Football League's Contribution to Football award on 5 March 2006 selected by listeners of BBC Radio 5 Live's Sport on Five.

With the season heading towards its climax, Town had to prepare for the play-offs after a disappointing April, which saw them lose out on automatic promotion to the Championship. The goals of Paweł Abbott, Gary Taylor-Fletcher, Andy Booth, Danny Schofield and Sheffield Wednesday loan signing David Graham helped Town to have the joint-second best scoring record in the division behind Swansea City.

Huddersfield beat Barnsley 1–0 at Barnsley in the play-off semi-final first leg but lost 1–3 (2–3 on aggregate) in the return. Season highlights included an away victory against local rivals Bradford City and a league double over fellow neighbours Oldham Athletic.

== Squad at the end of the season ==
Note: Flags indicate national team as defined under FIFA eligibility rules; some limited exceptions apply. Players may hold more than one non-FIFA nationality.

No.	Pos.	Nation	Player
1	GK	ENG	Paul Rachubka
2	DF	ENG	Andy Holdsworth
3	DF	ENG	Danny Adams
4	MF	ENG	Mark Hudson
5	DF	ENG	David Mirfin
6	DF	ENG	Nathan Clarke
7	MF	ENG	Chris Brandon
8	MF	ENG	Tony Carss
9	FW	POL	Paweł Abbott
10	FW	ENG	Gary Taylor-Fletcher
11	MF	ENG	Danny Schofield
12	MF	PAK	Adnan Ahmed
14	DF	ENG	Tom Clarke

No.	Pos.	Nation	Player
15	FW	IRL	John McAliskey
16	DF	SCO	Martin McIntosh
17	DF	ENG	John McCombe
18	MF	ENG	Jon Worthington (Captain)
19	DF	ENG	Anthony Lloyd
20	FW	MSR	Junior Mendes (on loan at Northampton Town)
21	FW	SCO	David Graham (on loan from Sheffield Wednesday)
22	GK	ENG	Phil Senior
23	FW	ENG	Andy Booth
24	MF	IRL	Michael Collins
25	MF	ENG	Matty Young
26	DF	ENG	Aaron Hardy

== Final league table ==
Pos	Team	Pld	W	D	L	GF	GA	GD	Pts	Qualification or relegation
2	Colchester United (P)	46	22	13	11	58	40	+18	79	Promotion to the Championship
3	Brentford	46	20	16	10	72	52	+20	76	Qualification for the League One play-offs
4	Huddersfield Town	46	19	16	11	72	59	+13	73	Qualification for the League One play-offs
5	Barnsley (O, P)	46	18	18	10	62	44	+18	72	Qualification for the League One play-offs
6	Swansea City	46	18	17	11	78	55	+23	71	Qualification for the League One play-offs

Rules for classification: 1) Points; 2) Goal difference; 3) Goals scored
(O) Play-off winners; (P) Promoted

== Results ==
=== Pre-season matches ===
Date	Competition	Opponents	Home/ Away	Result F - A	Scorers	Attendance
12 July 2005	Copa Ibiza Semi-Final	Coventry City	N	0 - 1		?
13 July 2005	Copa Ibiza 3rd Place Play-Off	Ibiza XI	N	2 - 1	Carss, Worthington	?
19 July 2005	Friendly match	Harrogate Town	A	4 - 1	Abbott 4	551
20 July 2005	Friendly match	Rossendale United	A	4 - 0	Hudson, T. Clarke, Mendes, Young	?
22 July 2005	Friendly match	Mansfield Town	A	2 - 1	Booth, Mendes	1,562
25 July 2005	Friendly match	A.F.C. Emley	A	1 - 1	McAliskey	346
30 July 2005	Friendly match	Rochdale	A	2 - 2	Booth, Abbott (pen)	1,903
1 August 2005	Friendly match	Bradford Park Avenue	A	3 - 2	Mendes 2, Carss	408

=== Football League One ===
Date	Opponents	Home/ Away	Result F - A	Scorers	Attendance	League position
6 August 2005	Nottingham Forest	A	1 - 2	Abbott [64 (pen)]	24,042	16th
9 August 2005	Bristol City	H	1 - 0	Abbott [89]	11,138	12th
13 August 2005	Swansea City	H	3 - 1	Booth [27], Abbott [41], Schofield [76]	10,304	3rd
20 August 2005	Southend United	A	1 - 1	Abbott [45]	5,567	5th
27 August 2005	Hartlepool United	H	2 - 1	Abbott [12], Schofield [17]	11,241	2nd
29 August 2005	Doncaster Rovers	A	2 - 1	Brandon [2], Worthington [40]	7,222	1st
2 September 2005	Scunthorpe United	H	1 - 4	Abbott [66 (pen)]	14,112	2nd
10 September 2005	Oldham Athletic	A	3 - 0	Schofield [27], Taylor-Fletcher [37, 72]	8,803	3rd
17 September 2005	Brentford	H	3 - 2	Abbott [34], Schofield [90], Booth [90]	11,622	2nd
24 September 2005	Colchester United	A	1 - 1	Taylor-Fletcher [65]	3,415	3rd
27 September 2005	Tranmere Rovers	H	1 - 0	Schofield [87]	10,640	3rd
1 October 2005	AFC Bournemouth	H	2 - 2	Schofield [14], Taylor-Fletcher [21]	13,522	3rd
10 October 2005	Bradford City	A	2 - 1	Hudson [21], Booth [79]	12,285	2nd
15 October 2005	Walsall	H	3 - 1	Booth [15], Abbott [34, 78]	11,642	1st
22 October 2005	Chesterfield	A	3 - 4	Hudson [80], Worthington [87], Holdsworth [90]	6,206	2nd
29 October 2005	Swindon Town	H	1 - 1	Brandon [54]	11,352	3rd
12 November 2005	Yeovil Town	A	2 - 1	Booth [11], Hudson [39]	6,742	2nd
19 November 2005	Bradford City	H	0 - 0		17,331	2nd
26 November 2005	Nottingham Forest	H	2 - 1	Schofield [21], Booth [26]	17,370	2nd
6 December 2005	Milton Keynes Dons	A	2 - 2	Abbott [7], Booth [64]	4,832	2nd
10 December 2005	Bristol City	A	0 - 2		9,949	2nd
17 December 2005	Southend United	H	0 - 0		11,223	3rd
26 December 2005	Rotherham United	A	1 - 1	Taylor-Fletcher [90]	7,380	3rd
28 December 2005	Port Vale	H	0 - 3		10,824	3rd
31 December 2005	Barnsley	A	2 - 2	Booth [76], Taylor-Fletcher [90]	13,063	4th
2 January 2006	Gillingham	H	0 - 0		11,483	5th
10 January 2006	Scunthorpe United	A	2 - 2	Schofield [44], McIntosh [90]	4,450	4th
14 January 2006	Blackpool	H	2 - 0	T. Clarke [9], Schofield [73]	11,977	3rd
21 January 2006	Brentford	A	0 - 2		7,636	5th
28 January 2006	Oldham Athletic	H	3 - 2	Branston [45 (og)], Abbott [48], Graham [59]	14,973	3rd
3 February 2006	Tranmere Rovers	A	1 - 2	Graham [48]	8,300	4th
11 February 2006	Colchester United	H	2 - 0	Worthington [14], Graham [68]	13,515	5th
14 February 2006	Blackpool	A	1 - 0	Brandon [43 (pen)]	6,004	5th
18 February 2006	Milton Keynes Dons	H	5 - 0	McIntosh [19], Taylor-Fletcher [24], Worthington [36], Mirfin [77], Collins [90]	11,423	3rd
24 February 2006	Swansea City	A	2 - 2	McIntosh [70], Graham [82]	13,110	2nd
4 March 2006	Doncaster Rovers	H	2 - 2	McIntosh [8], Graham [40]	14,490	2nd
10 March 2006	Hartlepool United	A	1 - 3	Graham [22]	5,648	3rd
18 March 2006	Rotherham United	H	4 - 1	Booth [32, 39, 82], Taylor-Fletcher [83]	15,264	3rd
25 March 2006	Port Vale	A	1 - 1	Booth [81]	5,664	2nd
1 April 2006	Barnsley	H	1 - 0	Taylor-Fletcher [55]	19,052	3rd
8 April 2006	Gillingham	A	0 - 2		7,014	3rd
15 April 2006	AFC Bournemouth	A	1 - 1	Taylor-Fletcher [71]	7,406	3rd
18 April 2006	Chesterfield	H	1 - 2	Graham [13]	13,368	4th
22 April 2006	Walsall	A	3 - 1	Graham [25], Abbott [83], Booth [90]	5,554	4th
29 April 2006	Yeovil Town	H	1 - 2	Graham [8]	14,473	4th
6 May 2006	Swindon Town	A	0 - 0		6,353	4th

=== League One Play-Offs ===
Date	Round	Opponents	Home/ Away	Result F - A	Scorers	Attendance
11 May 2006	Semi-Final 1st Leg	Barnsley	A	1 - 0	Taylor-Fletcher [85]	16,127
15 May 2006	Semi-Final 2nd Leg	Barnsley	H	1 - 3	Worthington [65]	19,223: Huddersfield lost 3–2 on aggregate.

=== FA Cup ===
Date	Round	Opponents	Home/ Away	Result F - A	Scorers	Attendance
6 November 2005	Round 1	Welling United	H	4 - 1	Booth [27, 69], Schofield [50 (pen)], Holdsworth [81]	5,518
4 December 2005	Round 2	Worcester City	A	1 - 0	Brandon [61]	4,163
7 January 2006	Round 3	Chelsea	A	1 - 2	Taylor-Fletcher [74]	41,650

=== League Cup ===
Date	Round	Opponents	Home/ Away	Result F - A	Scorers	Attendance
24 August 2005	Round 1	Chesterfield	A	4 - 2	Abbott [9], Taylor-Fletcher [56, 76, 90]	2,922
21 September 2005	Round 2	Blackburn Rovers	A	1 - 3	Abbott [79]	11,755

=== Football League Trophy ===
Date
19 October 2005
Round
Round 1

North

Opponents
Boston United
Home/
Away
A
Result
F - A
1 - 2
Scorers
Mirfin [68]
Attendance
1,593

== Appearances and goals ==
Squad No.	Name	Nationality	Position	League		FA Cup		League Cup		Football League Trophy		Play-offs		Total	
Squad No.	Name	Nationality	Position	Apps	Goals	Apps	Goals	Apps	Goals	Apps	Goals	Apps	Goals	Apps	Goals
1	Paul Rachubka	England	GK	34	0	2	0	2	0	1	0	2	0	41	0
2	Andy Holdsworth	England	DF	37 (5)	1	3	1	2	0	0 (1)	0	2	0	44 (6)	2
3	Danny Adams	England	DF	40	0	3	0	2	0	0	0	2	0	47	0
4	Mark Hudson	England	MF	25 (4)	3	3	0	0 (1)	0	0	0	2	0	30 (5)	3
5	David Mirfin	England	DF	27 (4)	1	2 (1)	0	0	0	0 (1)	1	0	0	29 (6)	2
6	Nathan Clarke	England	DF	46	0	3	0	2	0	0 (1)	0	2	0	53 (1)	0
7	Chris Brandon	England	MF	36 (4)	3	3	1	1 (1)	0	0	0	0 (1)	0	40 (6)	4
8	Tony Carss	England	MF	9 (8)	0	0 (1)	0	2	0	0	0	0	0	11 (9)	0
9	Pawel Abbott	Poland	FW	26 (10)	12	1 (2)	0	2	2	1	0	0 (2)	0	30 (14)	14
10	Gary Taylor-Fletcher	England	FW	30 (13)	10	3	1	1 (1)	3	1	0	2	1	37 (14)	15
11	Danny Schofield	England	MF	37 (4)	9	3	1	2	0	0	0	2	0	44 (4)	10
12	Adnan Ahmed	Pakistan	MF	4 (9)	0	1	0	0	0	0	0	0	0	5 (9)	0
14	Tom Clarke	England	DF	16 (1)	1	0 (1)	0	0 (1)	0	1	0	0	0	17 (3)	1
15	John McAliskey	Republic of Ireland	FW	0 (9)	0	0	0	0	0	0	0	0	0	0 (9)	0
16	Martin McIntosh	Scotland	DF	20 (2)	4	1	0	1	0	0	0	2	0	24 (2)	4
17	John McCombe	England	DF	1	0	0	0	1	0	1	0	0	0	3	0
18	Jon Worthington	England	MF	41	4	2	0	1	0	1	0	2	1	47	5
19	Anthony Lloyd	England	DF	0	0	0	0	0	0	1	0	0	0	1	0
19	Dan Smith	England	DF	7 (1)	0	0	0	0	0	0	0	0	0	7 (1)	0
20	Junior Mendes	Montserrat	MF	1 (4)	0	0	0	1 (1)	0	0	0	0	0	2 (5)	0
21	David Graham	Scotland	FW	15 (1)	9	0	0	0	0	0	0	2	0	17 (1)	9
22	Phil Senior	England	GK	12 (1)	0	1	0	0	0	0	0	0	0	13 (1)	0
23	Andy Booth	England	FW	33 (3)	13	2	2	1	0	0	0	2	0	38 (3)	15
24	Michael Collins	Republic of Ireland	MF	9 (8)	1	0 (2)	0	1	0	1	0	0	0	11 (10)	1
25	Matty Young	England	MF	0 (2)	0	0	0	0	0	1	0	0	0	1 (2)	0
26	Aaron Hardy	England	DF	0	0	0	0	0	0	1	0	0	0	1	0
27	James Hand	Republic of Ireland	MF	0	0	0	0	0	0	1	0	0	0	1	0
