= Danny Racchi =

English footballer (born 1987)

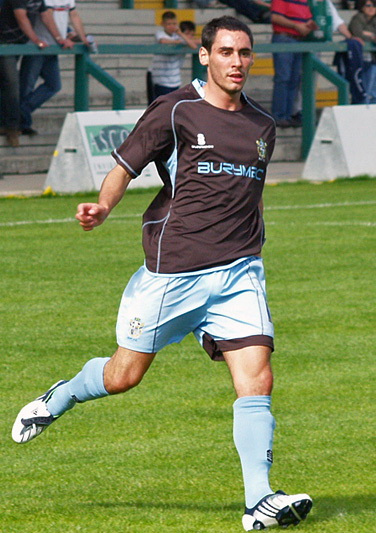
- Racchi playing for Bury in 2008

Personal information
- Full name: Daniel Craig Racchi
- Date of birth: 22 November 1987 (age 38)
- Place of birth: Elland, England
- Height: 5 ft 8 in (1.73 m)
- Positions: Defender; midfielder

Team information
- Current team: Grantham Town

Youth career
- –2007: Huddersfield Town

Senior career*
Years	Team	Apps	(Gls)
2007–2008	Huddersfield Town	6	(0)
2008–2010	Bury	43	(0)
2010	Wrexham	0	(0)
2010–2011	York City	17	(1)
2011–2013	Kilmarnock	35	(3)
2013	Valur	8	(2)
2015	Hyde	3	(1)
2015	FC Halifax Town	4	(0)
2015	Tamworth	5	(2)
2016	Torquay United	14	(0)
2017–2018	FC United of Manchester	16	(0)
2018–2019	Curzon Ashton	5	(0)
2019	Hednesford Town	9	(0)
2019	Grantham Town	15	(0)
2019–2020	Ilkeston Town	6	(0)
2020–2022	Grantham Town	5	(0)

Managerial career
- 2020: Grantham Town (caretaker)
- * Club domestic league appearances and goals as of 20:29, 28 September 2020 (UTC)

Daniel Craig Racchi (born 22 November 1987) is an English former professional footballer who last played as a defender or a midfielder for English side Grantham Town.

Racchi started his career with Huddersfield Town in their youth system, signing a professional contract with the club in 2006. He made his first-team debut in 2007, and having made six appearances he was released by Huddersfield in 2008. He was signed by Bury and played for them in the League Two play-offs in his first season. After being released in 2010, Racchi joined Conference Premier side Wrexham on non-contract terms, but after failing to make an appearance joined divisional rivals York City. He spent the remainder of the 2010–11 season with York, and after being released in 2011 signed for Kilmarnock of the Scottish Premier League. He was part of the squad that won the 2012 Scottish League Cup playing in the earlier rounds and semi final at Hampden park.

== Career ==
=== Huddersfield Town ===
Born in Elland, West Yorkshire, Racchi joined the Huddersfield Town youth system at the age of eight and signed a professional contract on 1 July 2006. He continued to train with the academy before getting his first call-up to the first team for Huddersfield's game against Port Vale on 31 March 2007, in which he replaced John McAliskey as a substitute with 10 minutes remaining.

On 15 May 2007, Racchi signed a new one-year contract with Huddersfield. Although he had yet to make his first start for Huddersfield, manager Andy Ritchie said at the time that he and some of the other academy players such as Lucas Akins and Mitchell Bailey still had a good future at the club. After three appearances during the 2007–08 season, he was released from the club in May 2008 by new manager Stan Ternent.

=== Bury ===
On 28 July, Racchi signed for League Two side Bury. In his first season at the club, Racchi made 24 appearances in all competitions mainly as back up to on-loan winger Elliott Bennett, helping the club reach the play-offs. At the end of the 2009–10 season, he was released by the club.

=== Wrexham ===
Racchi joined Conference Premier club Wrexham on trial and appeared in their pre-season friendly matches against Crewe Alexandra and Stoke City, hoping to win a contract for the coming season. On 16 August, he signed with the Welsh club on a non-contract basis.

=== York City ===
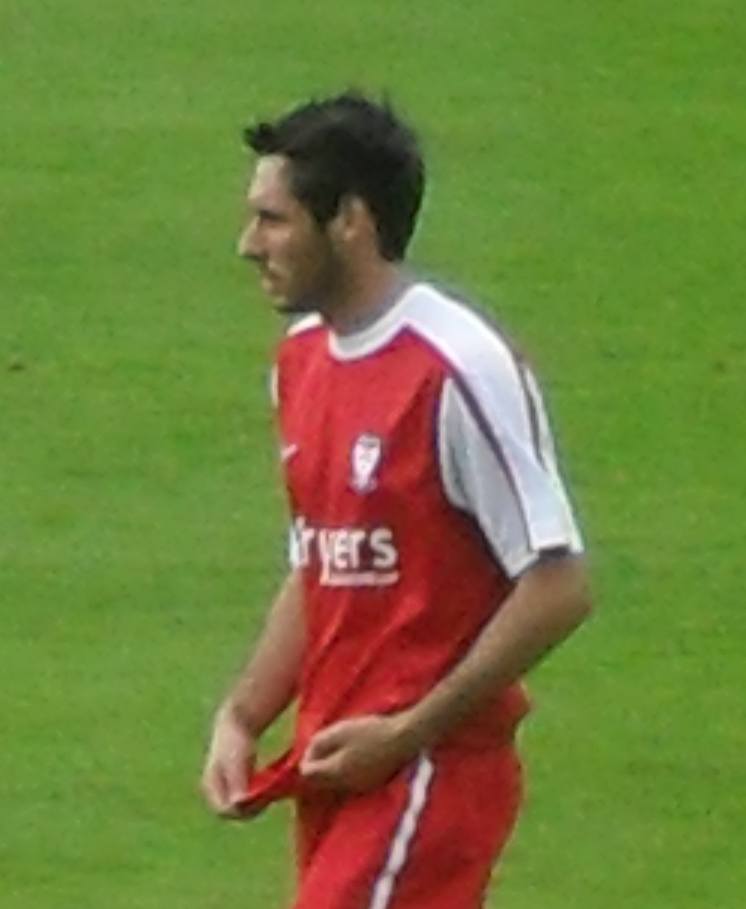
Racchi playing for York City in 2010

Racchi had a trial with fellow Conference Premier team York City in September 2010 and played for the reserve team in a 1–1 draw against Chesterfield. He eventually signed on a one-month contract on 18 September and made his debut that day after starting in a 2–0 victory over Hayes & Yeading United before being substituted in the 52nd minute. Racchi's contract was extended on 19 October by new manager Gary Mills, who said "I have been impressed with his enthusiasm and qualities". His first goal for the club came with the opener in a 2–0 victory at Kidderminster Harriers in the FA Cup fourth qualifying round on 23 October. He scored his first league goal with the opener from a 25-yard free kick in a 4–0 victory at Rushden & Diamonds on 20 November. He left the club on 17 December after his contract expired, although Mills said he wanted to re-sign him once the January transfer window opened. Racchi accepted a contract with York that would last until the end of the 2010–11 season on 27 December, which was signed on 1 January 2011. After requesting a transfer he was released from his contract with immediate effect on 7 April, having been unable to hold down a regular place in the team.

=== Kilmarnock ===
Following a trial, Racchi was offered a two-year contract by Scottish Premier League club Kilmarnock in May. He signed for them on 21 June 2011.

Racchi made his debut for Kilmarnock on 10 September in a 3–2 victory home to Dunfermline Athletic, coming on as a second-half substitute. He scored his first goal for Kilmarnock in a 2–1 defeat to Celtic at Celtic Park on 24 December, after coming on as a substitute. Racchi then started nine days later on 2 January 2012 and scored an 89th-minute winner against St Mirren with the game finishing 2–1 to Kilmarnock. After the match, Rachhi says: "It has been a little bit frustrating and there's definitely more to come from me. I can provide goals for Killie but you need to be on the pitch to do that." In April, Racchi continues to be in and out in the first team, but he would score the opening game before making an assist, in a 4–3 win over Inverness Caledonian Thistle. In his first season at Kilmarnock, Racchi made nineteen appearances and scored three times.

Racchi's second season started when he made three appearances, mostly coming on as a substitute. He scored his first goal of the season on 15 September 2012, in a 2–1 loss against Hibernian. Following this, Racchi began making assists in two matches. Despite described as a star player in the 2012–13 season by Manager Kenny Shiels, his first team opportunities was limited furthermore, as he soon sustained a knee injury during a match against Aberdeen in a 3–1 loss. He made his return in late-November, in a 2–1 loss against St Johnstone. Afterwards, Racchi expressed happiness to be back on the pitch, though sitting out made him feel miserable. However, he was absent again after suffering a serious illness.

Towards the end of the 2012–13 season, Racchi was fined four weeks wages and released by the club early. After being released, Racchi took the board of the Scottish Professional Football League in a preliminary hearing over a contractual dispute.

=== Valur ===
After being released by Kilmarnock, Racchi moved to Iceland, joining Icelandic club Valur for the second half of the season in the 2013 Úrvalsdeild. Racchi made his debut two days later, where Valur lost 3–1 against Fylkir and Racchi played 90 minutes. Racchi next appearance came on 29 July 2013, where he scored twice in a 6–4 victory over Keflavík. Since then, Racchi became the first team regular, though he made eight appearances this season, though he began to have discipline issue. It started when he received a second yellow card in a 2–2 draw against Þór Akureyri on 25 August 2013. After meeting with the Discipline and Complaints Committee, Racchi would miss the match towards the end of the season.

Ahead of the 2014 Úrvalsdeild season, Racchi was linked with a move back to Scotland, with a proposed move to Scottish Championship side Dundee. The move never happened and Racchi returned to Valur.

=== Return into non-League football ===
On 7 January 2015, Racchi returned to England to sign for Conference North club Hyde. He went on trial with his former club Wrexham for pre-season training, in the hope of winning a contract for the 2015/16 season.

On 31 August 2015, Racchi signed for his hometown team, National League club FC Halifax Town. Racchi, who grew up as a supporter of Halifax and used to be a ballboy at The Shay, made his debut in a 3–1 home win over Barrow. He signed for National League North club Tamworth in October 2015. He scored twice from five appearances, but was released by Tamworth on 1 December 2015 because of the long commute to the club.

On 1 February 2016, Racchi signed for National League team Torquay United on a contract until the end of the season, after impressing on trial. Despite helping Torquay avoid relegation, he was released by the club in May 2016.

On 22 February 2019, Racchi joined Hednesford Town. Three months later, he joined Grantham Town. On 18 November 2019, he moved to Ilkeston Town. In January 2020, he returned to Grantham Town. On 27 February 2020, Racchi was appointed joint-caretaker manager. The duo was replaced on 3 March 2020 after one game in charge, which they won, and Racchi continued as a player.

In October 2020, Racchi joined Brighouse Town where he remained until the club announced his retirement on 11 January 2022.

== Career statistics ==
As of match played 10 March 2020

Appearances and goals by club, season and competition
Club	Season	League			National Cup		League Cup		Other		Total	
Club	Season	Division	Apps	Goals	Apps	Goals	Apps	Goals	Apps	Goals	Apps	Goals
Huddersfield Town	2006–07	League One	3	0	0	0	0	0	0	0	3	0
Huddersfield Town	2007–08	League One	3	0	0	0	0	0	0	0	3	0
Huddersfield Town	Total		6	0	0	0	0	0	0	0	6	0
Bury	2008–09	League Two	21	0	1	0	0	0	2 (Note: One appearance in Football League Trophy; one appearance in League Two play-offs)	0	24	0
Bury	2009–10	League Two	22	0	1	0	1	0	2 (Note: Appearance(s) in Football League Trophy)	1	26	1
Bury	Total		43	0	2	0	1	0	4	1	50	1
York City	2010–11	Conference Premier	17	1	5	1	—		1 (Note: Appearance(s) in FA Trophy)	0	23	2
Kilmarnock	2011–12	Scottish Premier League	19	2	3	0	1	0	—		23	2
Kilmarnock	2012–13	Scottish Premier League	16	1	1	0	1	0	—		18	1
Kilmarnock	Total		35	3	4	0	2	0	—		41	3
Valur	2013	Úrvalsdeild	8	2	0	0	0	0	—		8	2
Hyde	2014–15	Conference North	3	1	0	0	—		2 (Note: One appearance in FA Trophy; one appearance in Cheshire Senior Cup)	0	5	1
FC Halifax Town	2015–16	National League	4	0	0	0	—		0	0	4	0
Tamworth	2015–16	National League North	5	2	0	0	—		0	0	5	2
Torquay United	2015–16	National League	14	0	0	0	—		3	0	17	0
FC United of Manchester	2017–18	National League North	12	0	0	0	—		2 (Note: Appearance(s) in Manchester Premier Cup)	0	14	0
FC United of Manchester	2018–19	National League North	4	0	0	0	—		0	0	4	0
FC United of Manchester	Total		16	0	0	0	—		2	0	18	0
Curzon Ashton	2018–19	National League North	5	0	0	0	—		0	0	5	0
Hednesford Town	2018–19	Northern Premier League Premier Division	9	0	0	0	—		0	0	9	0
Grantham Town	2019–20	Northern Premier League Premier Division	20	0	2	0	—		3 (Note: One appearance in FA Trophy; one appearance in Northern Premier League Challenge Cup; one appearance in Lincolnshire Senior Cup)	0	25	0
Career total			185	9	13	1	3	0	15	1	216	11
