= Mark Hudson (footballer, born 1980) =

English footballer

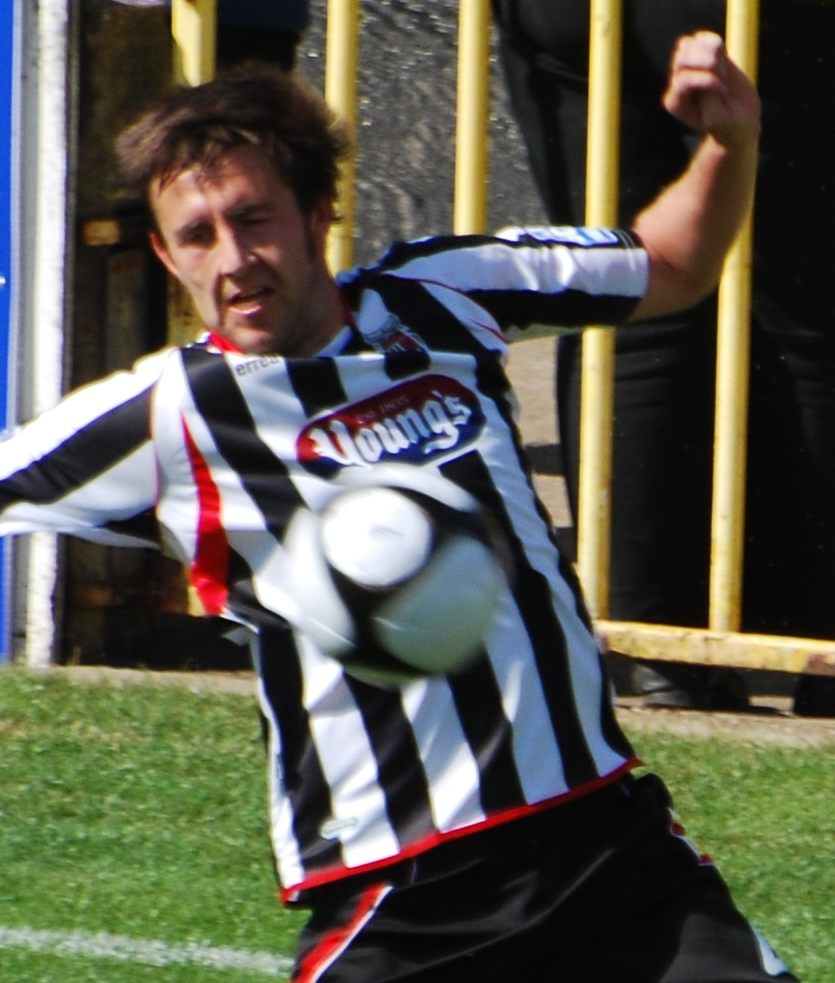
- Hudson playing for Grimsby Town in 2010

Personal information
- Full name: Mark Hudson
- Date of birth: 24 October 1980 (age 46)
- Place of birth: Bishop Auckland, England
- Height: 5 ft 10 in (1.78 m)
- Position: Midfielder

Team information
- Current team: Hebburn Town F.C. (Assistant Manager)

Youth career
- –1999: Middlesbrough

Senior career*
Years	Team	Apps	(Gls)
1999–2003	Middlesbrough	5	(0)
2002	→ Chesterfield (loan)	16	(1)
2002–2003	→ Carlisle United (loan)	15	(1)
2003–2005	Chesterfield	77	(8)
2005–2007	Huddersfield Town	63	(6)
2007–2009	Rotherham United	73	(14)
2009	Blackpool	0	(0)
2009	Gainsborough Trinity	8	(3)
2009–2011	Grimsby Town	56	(7)
2011–2012	Worksop Town	27	(4)
2012	Bradford Park Avenue	1	(0)
2012	West Auckland Town	15	(2)
2012	Ashington	5	(1)
2012	Sunderland RCA	7	(1)
2012–2016	Shildon		
2016–2017	West Auckland Town		
Total		368	(48)
- * Club domestic league appearances and goals as of 19:15, 16 March 2011 (UTC)

Mark Hudson (born 24 October 1980) is an English football coach and former professional footballer who is assistant manager of Shildon.

As a player he was a midfielder from 1999 until 2016, he notably played in the Football League for Middlesbrough, Chesterfield, Carlisle United, Huddersfield Town, Rotherham United and Blackpool. He moved into Non-League football with Gainsborough Trinity in 2009 before joining Grimsby Town where he remained for two seasons. The final five years of his career saw him play for a variety of semi-professional sides such as Worksop Town, Bradford Park Avenue, West Auckland Town, Ashington, Sunderland RCA and Shildon

== Playing career ==
=== Middlesbrough ===
Born in Bishop Auckland, Hudson started his career at Middlesbrough where he moved up to the first team squad in 1999, making his debut in a memorable 1–0 win over Liverpool in December 2000. However, he did not make a significant breakthrough into the Middlesbrough side, and made just six appearances in four years with the club. On 13 August 2002 he joined Chesterfield on a three-month loan, making 19 appearances and scoring one goal against Northampton, before returning to Middlesbrough on 17 November. Three days later he was sent out on loan again, this time to Carlisle United where he stayed for four months making 15 appearances and scoring one goal against Darlington.

=== Chesterfield ===
On 21 March 2003, two days after he had returned from his loan spell with Carlisle, Hudson was sold to Chesterfield. He scored on his debut as a permanent Spireites player the following day in a 4–1 home win over Wycombe Wanderers. He played in central midfield with the club, making a total of 82 appearances and scoring eight goals in two years. In 2005, he was made club captain, and the club offered him a contract extension, but he rejected it.

=== Huddersfield Town ===
Huddersfield Town snapped up Hudson on a free transfer on 28 June 2005. He made his debut on 8 August in a 2–1 defeat to Nottingham Forest. His first goal for the club was a direct free kick in a 2–1 away win over Bradford City on 10 October.

Hudson found it hard to cement a place in the Terriers' central midfield, as he was up against captain Jon Worthington and youngsters Adnan Ahmed and Michael Collins. By the end of the 2005–06 season, Town manager Peter Jackson, started putting him in a holding midfield role, and continued this into the following season. After several poor performances, Jackson put Hudson on the transfer list and declared that he would never select Hudson or teammate Martin McIntosh again. Jackson was dismissed from the managers' job, leading to Hudson's brief recall to the side under Andy Ritchie. In two years with the Terriers Hudson made 69 appearances, scoring six goals.

=== Rotherham United ===
Hudson joined Rotherham United on 15 June 2007. He made his debut on 20 October in a 3–1 home win over Morecambe. His first goal came in his third game for the Millers, a 2–1 home win over Grimsby Town on 3 November. He made 33 appearances in the 2007–08 season, scoring nine goals. In the 2008–09 season he was a regular in the side, making 50 appearances and scoring six goals.

=== Blackpool ===
On 10 August 2009 Hudson signed for Championship side Blackpool on a non-contract basis with Adam Nowland. The following day he played in the Seasiders 2–1 victory over Crewe Alexandra in the first round of the 2009–10 League Cup. Two days later they were both released.

=== Gainsborough Trinity ===
Hudson signed for Conference North side Gainsborough Trinity on 26 September, dropping four leagues down from his last club. He became the first new signing for manager Brian Little. He made his debut in the FA Cup second qualifying round tie with Market Drayton Town. He made his league debut the following week, scoring in a 2–2 draw with Fleetwood Town. On 28 October, Hudson was allowed to join Grimsby Town on trial and also turn out for the club's reserves in a 5–3 victory over the Lincoln City second string at Sincil Bank.

=== Grimsby Town ===
Hudson signed for Grimsby Town on 26 November 2009, after completing a successful trial period. After appearing on the bench as an unused substitute in every game prior, he eventually made his debut for the club on 6 February 2010 in the 1–0 home defeat against Notts County, albeit is a 75th minute replacement for Tommy Wright. Hudson and Grimsby suffered relegation from the Football League. Following the conclusion of the 2010–2011 season in the Conference National Hudson was released by Grimsby Town.

=== Later career ===
On 30 July Hudson joined Conference National side Alfreton Town on trial. On 9 August 2011 he signed a one-year deal with Worksop Town.

On 15 March 2012 Hudson moved to Worksop's Northern Premier League rivals Bradford Park Avenue in order to help with the club's promotion bid. Hudson stated though he had enjoyed his time at Worksop, they were only in mid table and didn't have a chance of winning promotion to the Conference North.

A week after signing for Bradford Park Avenue, Hudson signed with West Auckland Town, which is where he remained until the end of the 2011–12 season. In July 2012 he signed for Ashington. In September 2012 he had a brief spell with Sunderland RCA before joining Shildon a month later.

== Coaching career ==
On 30 October 2017, Hudson joined Shildon as a first team coach.

== Career statistics ==
Appearances and goals by club, season and competition
Club	Season	League			FA Cup		League Cup		FL Trophy		Total	
Club	Season	Division	Apps	Goals	Apps	Goals	Apps	Goals	Apps	Goals	Apps	Goals
Middlesbrough	2000–01	Premier League	3	0	1	0	0	0	0	0	4	0
Middlesbrough	2001–02	Premier League	2	0	0	0	0	0	0	0	2	0
Middlesbrough	2002–03	Premier League	0	0	0	0	0	0	0	0	0	0
Middlesbrough	Total		5	0	1	0	0	0	0	0	6	0
Chesterfield (loan)	2002–03	Second Division	16	1	1	0	1	0	1	0	19	1
Carlisle United (loan)	2002–03	Third Division	15	1	0	0	0	0	0	0	15	1
Chesterfield	2002–03	Second Division	8	2	0	0	0	0	0	0	8	2
Chesterfield	2003–04	Second Division	35	2	0	0	1	0	2	0	38	2
Chesterfield	2004–05	League One	34	4	1	0	0	0	1	0	36	4
Chesterfield	Total		77	8	1	0	1	0	3	0	82	8
Huddersfield Town	2005–06	League One	31	3	3	0	1	0	0	0	35	3
Huddersfield Town	2006–07	League One	32	3	1	0	1	0	0	0	34	3
Huddersfield Town	Total		63	6	4	0	2	0	0	0	69	6
Rotherham United	2007–08	League Two	31	9	2	0	0	0	0	0	33	9
Rotherham United	2008–09	League Two	42	5	1	0	2	0	5	1	50	6
Rotherham United	Total		73	14	3	0	2	0	5	1	83	15
Blackpool	2009–10	Championship	0	0	0	0	1	0	0	0	1	0
Gainsborough Trinity	2009–10	Conference North	8	3	1	0	0	0	0	0	9	3
Grimsby Town	2009–10	League Two	16	2	0	0	1	0	0	0	17	2
Grimsby Town	2010–11	Conference Premier	40	5	0	0	0	0	0	0	40	5
Grimsby Town	Total		56	7	0	0	1	0	0	0	57	7
Career total			313	40	11	0	8	0	9	1	344	41
