= Malvin Kamara =

Footballer (born 1983)

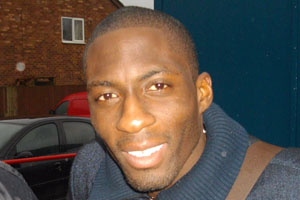
- Kamara in 2011

Personal information
- Full name: Malvin Ginah Kamara
- Date of birth: 17 November 1983 (age 42)
- Place of birth: Plumstead, London, England
- Height: 5 ft 7 in (1.70 m)
- Positions: Midfielder; full-back

Youth career
- West Ham United
- Wimbledon

Senior career*
Years	Team	Apps	(Gls)
2003–2004	Wimbledon	29	(2)
2004–2006	Milton Keynes Dons	48	(3)
2006–2007	Cardiff City	15	(1)
2007	Port Vale	18	(1)
2007–2009	Huddersfield Town	45	(3)
2008	→ Grimsby Town (loan)	2	(0)
2009	Barrow	6	(2)
2010	Guiseley	5	(1)
2010	Forest Green Rovers	2	(0)
2011	Stafford Rangers	2	(0)
2011	Tamworth	9	(0)
2011	Farnborough	0	(0)
2011	Dulwich Hamlet		(2)
2011–2012	Lewes	25	(0)
2012–2017	Hampton & Richmond Borough		
Total		206	(15)

International career
2007	Sierra Leone	1	(0)
- * Club domestic league appearances and goals

Malvin Ginah Kamara (born 17 November 1983) is a former professional footballer who played as a midfielder or full-back. Born in England, he was capped by Sierra Leone in 2007.

Starting his professional career with Wimbledon in 2003, he remained as the club became the Milton Keynes Dons, before he transferred to Cardiff City in 2006. The following year, he moved on to Huddersfield Town via Port Vale. He spent a brief time on loan at Grimsby Town in 2008 before he entered non-League football with Barrow in 2009. Over the next three years, he spent brief periods at Guiseley, Forest Green Rovers, Stafford Rangers, Tamworth, Farnborough, Dulwich Hamlet, and Lewes, before he signed for Hampton & Richmond Borough in August 2012.

== Club career ==
=== Wimbledon and MK Dons ===
Kamara came through Wimbledon's youth setup, joining professionally in January 2003. His debut came on 21 April 2003 at Selhurst Park in a 2–0 win over Preston North End. He was a 72nd minute substitute for Patrick Agyemang. He managed to establish himself as a semi-regular in the 2003–04 season, playing 27 First Division games. His first goal came in a 2–1 home defeat to Sunderland on 6 April. His second came eleven days later, in a 3–2 win at the Valley Parade, opening the scoring against Bradford City after just five minutes.

He stuck with the club through their transformation into the Milton Keynes Dons in the summer of 2004. He made 29 appearances in the MK Dons first ever season, scoring once in the League Cup in a 3–0 at Peterborough United and once in the league against Walsall. He was to play 30 games the following season, as the club suffered relegation from League One.

=== Cardiff City, Port Vale and Huddersfield Town ===
In July 2006, after finding out he would not be offered a new contract at the club, Kamara moved on to Cardiff City. He made 16 appearances for Championship side Cardiff, though made just four starts, scoring once against Wolverhampton Wanderers.

In January 2007, he transferred to Martin Foyle's Port Vale for a nominal fee, and made 14 league starts before the season's end. His stay at Vale Park proved to be a short one.

In June 2007, he signed with Huddersfield Town. Regular first-team football followed in the 2007–08 season as he played fifty games over all competitions for the Yorkshire based club. He scored five goals, including two against Accrington Stanley in the FA Cup first round tie at the Crown Ground. These goals proved vital in what was a 3–2 win, helping the club to eventually reach the fifth round, where they were beaten 3–1 by Chelsea at Stamford Bridge. He joined League Two side Grimsby Town on loan in September 2008, making his debut for the club in a 1–0 defeat by Barnet at Blundell Park on 28 September. He returned to the Galpharm Stadium on 25 October, after playing just two matches at Grimsby. Huddersfield released him in May 2009, his three appearances for the club during the 2008–09 season a stark contrast to his virtual ever-presence the season previous.

=== Non-League ===
In August 2009, he joined old-club Port Vale on trial, hoping to impress mew manager Micky Adams. The trial ended quickly however, Adams instead opting to look at other options, and Kamara with an offer of a trial at an unnamed League One club. On 25 September 2009, it was announced that Kamara had signed for Conference National side Barrow. He made his debut the following day in Barrow's 3–0 away defeat at Salisbury City. Kamara scored on his home debut three days later in a 3–1 win over Mansfield Town. Despite being a regular starter in the side, Kamara was released for personal reasons at the start of December. He joined Guiseley of the Conference North in February 2010, but left at the end of the season seeking a professional contract. In the summer he went on trial at Bradford City, but did not sign.

In October 2010, he signed a non-contract deal with Conference National side Forest Green Rovers. After making only a few league appearances, he was released in December of that year. In January 2011, Kamara signed for Conference North side Stafford Rangers. Kamara did not play any games for Stafford however, before moving back into the Conference. He then signed for Tamworth on 18 January 2011. He made his debut the same day, coming on as a substitute against Altrincham. In March 2011, Karama had his contract cancelled, as did youth players Troy Wallen and Alando Lewis. A few days after his contract was cancelled with the "Lambs", Kamara joined Farnborough in the Conference South. However, he quickly changed his mind, and instead opted to join Dulwich Hamlet in the Isthmian League Division One South. He grabbed a brace for Dulwich in a 5–2 defeat of Chatham Town on 16 April.

He signed for Lewes of the Isthmian League Premier Division in August 2011. The 2011–12 season was turbulent for the "Rooks", with numerous management changes at The Dripping Pan; Lewes ended the season one place and two points outside the play-offs. He switched to league rivals Hampton & Richmond Borough in August 2012.

== International career ==
On 3 June 2007, he picked up his first cap for Sierra Leone in a 2008 Africa Cup of Nations qualification match against Togo in Freetown, which Sierra Leone lost 1–0.

== Personal life ==
The son of Albert and Winifred Kamara, he has an elder brother and a half-sister, as well as a twin-brother Michael, who is the lead singer of funk band Nexus. Kamara himself is something of a soul singer, having taken the mic at a charity concert in January 2005. He had an odd ritual of watching Willy Wonka & the Chocolate Factory before every game in order to calm his nerves.

Kamara entered the energy industry after retiring as a player, and in 2016, co-launched recruitment, consultancy and coaching consultancy firm Vallum Associates.

== Career statistics ==
Appearances and goals by club, season and competition
Club	Season	League			FA Cup		League Cup		Other		Total	
Club	Season	Division	Apps	Goals	Apps	Goals	Apps	Goals	Apps	Goals	Apps	Goals
Wimbledon	2002–03	First Division	2	0	0	0	0	0	0	0	2	0
Wimbledon	2003–04	First Division	27	2	0	0	0	0	0	0	27	2
Wimbledon	Total		29	2	0	0	0	0	0	0	29	2
Milton Keynes Dons	2004–05	League One	25	1	2	0	1	1	1 (Note: Appearance(s) in the EFL Trophy.)	0	29	2
Milton Keynes Dons	2005–06	League One	23	2	3	0	1	0	3	0	30	2
Milton Keynes Dons	Total		48	3	5	0	2	1	4	0	59	4
Cardiff City	2006–07	Championship	15	1	0	0	1	0	—		16	1
Port Vale	2006–07	League One	18	1	—		—		—		18	1
Huddersfield Town	2007–08	League One	43	3	5	2	1	0	1	0	50	5
Huddersfield Town	2008–09	League One	2	0	0	0	2	0	0	0	4	0
Huddersfield Town	Total		45	3	5	2	3	0	1	0	54	5
Grimsby Town (loan)	2008–09	League Two	2	0	0	0	—		0	0	2	0
Barrow	2009–10	Conference National	6	2	1	0	—		0	0	7	2
Forest Green Rovers	2010–11	Conference National	2	0	1	0	—		0	0	3	0
Stafford Rangers	2010–11	Conference North	2	0	0	0	—		0	0	2	0
Tamworth	2010–11	Conference National	9	0	—		—		—		9	0
Farnborough	2010–11	Conference South	0	0	0	0	—		0	0	0	0
Lewes	2011–12	Isthmian League; Premier Division	25	0								
