= Chris Brandon =

Professional footballer (born 1976)

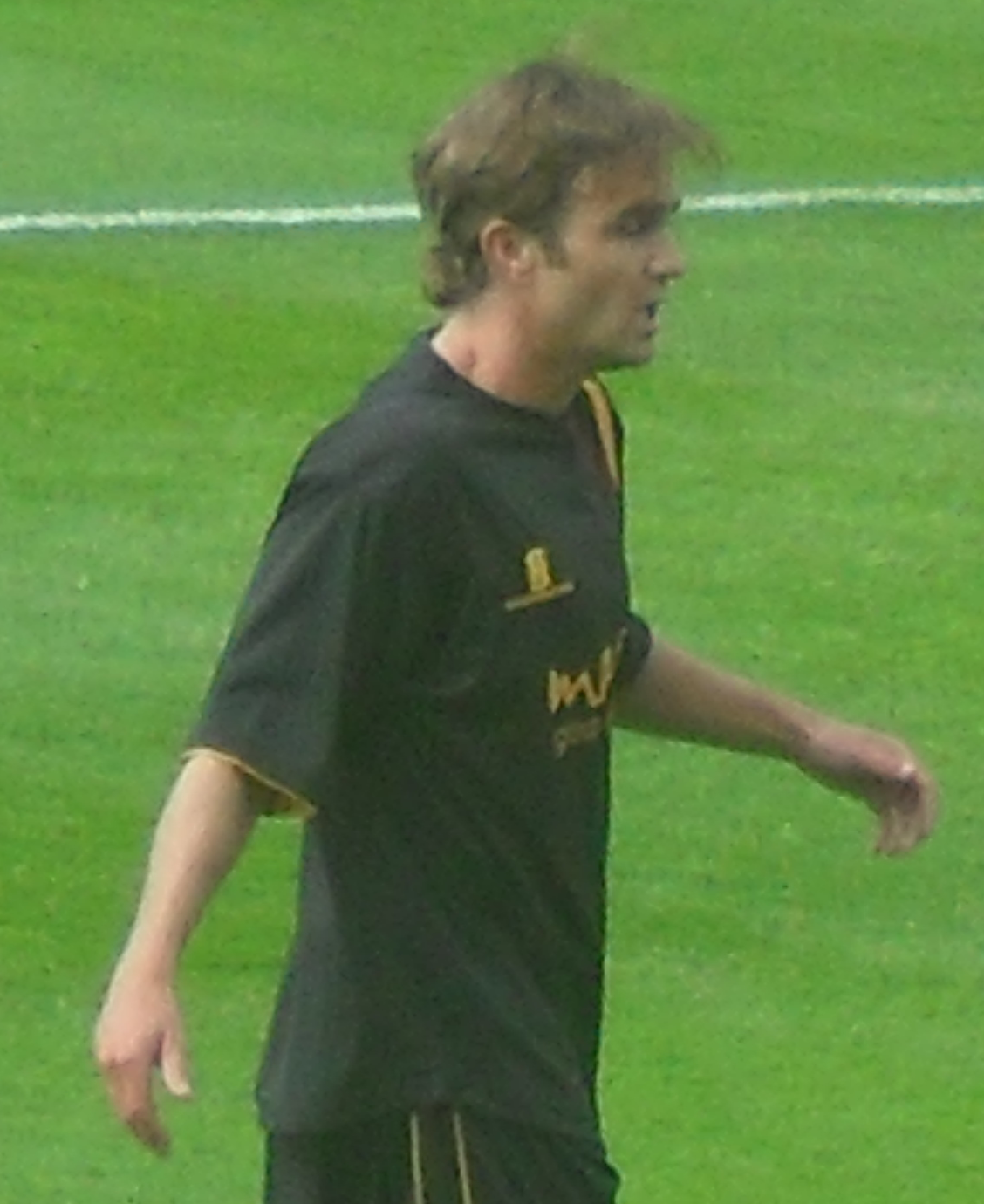
- Brandon in Bradford City colours in 2009

Personal information
- Full name: Christopher William Brandon
- Date of birth: 7 April 1976 (age 50)
- Place of birth: Bradford, England
- Height: 5 ft 7 in (1.70 m)
- Position: Midfielder

Youth career
- Bradford City
- Bradford Park Avenue

Senior career*
Years	Team	Apps	(Gls)
1995–1997	Bradford Park Avenue		
1997	Farsley Celtic		
1997–1999	Stafford Rangers	32	(0)
1999	Bradford Park Avenue		
1999–2002	Torquay United	71	(8)
2002–2004	Chesterfield	79	(11)
2004–2008	Huddersfield Town	135	(12)
2007	→ Blackpool (loan)	5	(2)
2008–2010	Bradford City	27	(2)
2011	BEC Tero Sasana	14	(1)
2012	PTT Rayong		
Total		363	(36)
- * Club domestic league appearances and goals

Christopher William Brandon (born 7 April 1976) is an English professional footballer who last played in Thailand for BEC Tero Sasana. He is a midfielder who has played more than 300 games during his professional career, which did not start until he was aged 23. After he was released by Bradford City's youth academy as a youngster he followed a non-league career with Bradford Park Avenue, Farsley Celtic and Stafford Rangers.

He became a professional in 1999 with Division Three side Torquay United. Torquay were aiming for promotion during Brandon's first season with the club, but they finished two places outside the Division Three play-offs. He only played two games the following season because of a stomach tear, and upon his return Torquay were instead battling against relegation from The Football League, and Brandon left after three seasons with the club. He moved up a division and played for two years with Chesterfield, where he picked up a number of individual awards but spent two seasons fighting against relegation. In 2004, he joined Huddersfield Town where he twice narrowly missed out on promotion. He had a short spell on loan with Blackpool, helping them to the promotion play-offs. However, after a permanent move failed to materialise he returned to Huddersfield for a fourth season. When he was released by new manager Stan Ternent after four years with the club, he rejoined Bradford City, but had two injury-hit seasons before being released early from his contract. At the start of the following year, he moved to Thailand to join BEC Tero Sasana.

== Early life ==
Brandon was born in Bradford, West Yorkshire, England, on 7 April 1976. He attended Yorkshire Martyrs Collegiate School in Bradford and supported the city's Football League team Bradford City.

== Career ==
=== Early career ===
Brandon started his football career as a trainee for Bradford City, but he was dropped by their academy and joined non-league side Bradford Park Avenue. He later played for Farsley Celtic before joining Stafford Rangers. He played 32 times for Rangers over two seasons before returning to play for Bradford Park Avenue. In his two spells with Park Avenue, Brandon played a total of 107 games.

=== Torquay United ===
In March 1999, he played as a trialist in a reserve match for Lincoln City, but failed to win a contract. Five months later, he was signed by Division Three side Torquay United. He made his debut in the opening fixture of the 1999–2000 season as Torquay defeated Shrewsbury Town at Gay Meadow. He established himself as a first-team regular and played 50 games in all competitions, scoring a total of five goals, the first of which came in a 2–1 victory against Peterborough United on 19 October 1999. Torquay finished in ninth place in Division Three, just three points outside the play-off places.

In July 2000, he signed a new two-year deal with Torquay. However, only two games into the following season, he picked up a stomach tear, which kept him out for the rest of the season. Without Brandon, Torquay could not match their high league position of the previous season, and finished 21st, four points above Barnet who were relegated out of The Football League.

He returned from injury in time for the start of the 2001–02 season and once again he became an established member of the team during the start of the campaign. He was dropped from the side for a period of time following an FA Cup defeat to Northampton Town in November 2001, during which he missed an open goal. He returned to the first team in January 2002 and scored on his second game back in the starting eleven as Torquay defeated Bristol Rovers. Two months later, he scored a vital goal in a 2–0 victory over Lincoln City, which helped Torquay to only their second home victory in four months and move them 13 points clear of the relegation zone. Torquay finished the season only two places higher than their previous campaign, but 15 points above relegated Halifax Town. During his disrupted three seasons with Torquay, Brandon amassed 83 appearances with ten goals to his credit, before he moved to Chesterfield in July 2002 on a free transfer.

=== Chesterfield ===
Brandon signed a two-year contract with Division Two side Chesterfield, and made his debut against Queens Park Rangers on the first day of the 2002–03 season. Chesterfield lost the game at Loftus Road 3–1. Brandon's first goal for Chesterfield came a week later when he scored a 12-yard overhead kick to give them a late 2–1 victory over Port Vale. He scored again just ten days later as Chesterfield defeated Northampton Town 4–0. His third goal was another volley during a 1–0 victory over Stockport County. However, he was substituted at half-time, and he did not play for another two weeks because of suspension, until he scored again in a League Cup game against West Ham United live on television, which Chesterfield lost on penalties. He scored in both the first and second rounds of the Football League Trophy, but Chesterfield were defeated on penalties by Port Vale in the second round. He finished the season with ten goals but also 11 yellow cards. However, he played only one game during the final month, with his last game coming on 21 April 2003, when Chesterfield finished with just nine players because of serious injuries to Brandon and striker Caleb Folan. Chesterfield picked up four points in their final two games without Brandon, and avoided relegation by just one position, finishing two points above Cheltenham Town. Brandon's ten goals meant he finished as Chesterfield's top goalscorer and also helped Brandon win three awards at the club's end of season awards, as well as reported interest from nearby Nottingham Forest, who had missed out on promotion to the Premier League.

Brandon overcame his hamstring problems to return before the start of the following season, at the start of which he maintained his goalscoring form, scoring twice within the space of three days, as Chesterfield drew 3–3 with Wycombe Wanderers, then 1–1 with Plymouth Argyle. He only managed another four goals all season, but they included two against Lincoln City in a Football League Trophy defeat and one goal to help Chesterfield's fight to avoid relegation in a 3–1 victory over local rivals Sheffield Wednesday. He finished the season with six goals, which took his tally for Chesterfield to 16 goals from 88 games. Chesterfield again finished just one place above the relegation zone, and Brandon left in July 2004 to sign for Huddersfield Town under manager Peter Jackson on a free transfer.

=== Huddersfield Town ===
Huddersfield had been one of the teams relegated below Chesterfield in 2002–03, but had been immediately promoted back to League One. Brandon made his debut for Huddersfield on the opening day of the 2004–05 season in a 3–2 victory over Stockport County. Chesterfield goalkeeper Carl Muggleton twice denied him a goal in his first home game three days later, but Brandon only had to wait until the following month when he scored in a 4–0 victory against Hull City. Brandon scored a total of six goals in his first season with Huddersfield, but also received the first red card of his professional career in a 1–0 win over Blackpool for a professional foul. Two of Brandon's goals came as Huddersfield pushed for a play-off place with a run of five successive victories, but they could only finish ninth, just one point behind Hartlepool United in the final play-off spot. Jackson praised Brandon for his "workrate and skill" and offered him and captain Jon Worthington each new two-year deals.

Huddersfield started the 2005–06 season in the same form. Brandon scored his first goal of the season during a 2–1 win over Doncaster Rovers on 29 August 2008, which gave them their fifth win from seven games during the month. In mid-November, Brandon signed the two-year contract extension, which kept him at Huddersfield until June 2008, and instantly targeted promotion. The following month Brandon scored the only goal of a 1–0 win over non-league Worcester City in the FA Cup second round to earn Huddersfield a tie with Premiership champions Chelsea at Stamford Bridge. Two days later, Brandon received another red card, as both he and David Mirfin were sent off in the final minute of a 2–2 draw with Milton Keynes Dons. Brandon returned to the side following his suspension and helped Huddersfield to win a place in the play-offs. He was an unused substitute in the first leg 1–0 victory over Barnsley, and he played just eight minutes of the second leg, as Huddersfield lost 3–1 to again miss out on promotion.

The following season was interrupted by an achilles injury for Brandon. It was not until February 2007, that Brandon scored his first goal of the 2006–07 season, during Huddersfield Town's 2–1 defeat to Crewe Alexandra. He only played one more game for Huddersfield that season, before he joined fellow League One side Blackpool on loan on 21 March 2007, joining another Town teammate, goalkeeper Paul Rachubka. Blackpool were searching for promotion and Brandon helped when he scored two goals during a 4–1 defeat of Northampton Town. However, he was sent off on 28 April 2007 in Blackpool's win at home to Scunthorpe United, which resulted in his missing the Seasiders' play-off games, and therefore not being considered for their successful final at Wembley against Yeovil Town. Brandon played in five games during his loan spell, all of which Blackpool won.

It seemed certain that manager Simon Grayson was going to purchase Brandon, but instead Grayson bought Brandon's teammate Gary Taylor-Fletcher. Brandon returned to Huddersfield and was back in first team. However, after he was substituted on 14 October 2007 against Doncaster Rovers, he did not feature again until the New Year. On 5 January 2008, his second game back in the Huddersfield side, Brandon scored another FA Cup winning goal to knock Premier League side Birmingham City out of the competition in a 2–1 defeat at the Galpharm Stadium. He scored his second goal of the season, in the following game against Gillingham, but was sent off in the final minute of a 1–1 draw with Brighton & Hove Albion the next week. Brandon's red card meant he was suspended for Huddersfield's fourth round FA Cup tie with Oldham Athletic, but following a 1–0 victory, he returned in time for their visit to Chelsea in the fifth round, which Chelsea won 3–1. Brandon scored just one more goal during the rest of the season, with his last game coming on 15 April 2008 in the Yorkshire derby with Leeds United. With his contract due to expire in the summer, it turned out to be his final game for Huddersfield after 135 league appearances, during which time he scored 12 goals, and a total of 148 games.

=== Bradford City ===
"This club deserves to be higher up the divisions with the fans and the ground we've got and I'll do everything I can to be part of that. It will be the highlight of my career."

— Chris Brandon

After being one of eight players to be released by new Huddersfield manager Stan Ternent in early May 2008, Brandon turned down the chance to join another League One side and instead dropped down a division for the first time in six years to sign a two-year deal at Bradford City on 30 May 2008. Although Bradford were a League Two side, Brandon said it would be the highlight of his career to play for his hometown club.

An ankle injury, which Brandon picked up in a pre-season tour game against Scottish side Motherwell kept Brandon out of the side at the start of the 2008–09 season. This included a League Cup game against his old side Huddersfield Town on 12 August 2008, for which he was a spectator as Bradford lost 4–0. When he attempted to make a comeback, he injured his other ankle in a reserve game with Scunthorpe United and was forced to undergo the first operation of his career which kept him out until January 2009. Once he returned to training in January, his first team debut was again delayed after a shoulder injury suffered at home. He returned to action for the reserves against Doncaster Rovers in February, before making his long-awaited debut on 7 March 2009 against Aldershot Town with City three goals ahead in a game which finally finished 5–0. He finished the season playing seven games. However, City missed out on promotion and Brandon's future was cast into doubt because of the size of his contract and budget cuts at the club.

Brandon, however, remained at Bradford for the 2009–10 season and he scored his first goal for his hometown club with a late goal in a 2–0 victory against his former side Torquay United in late August. The following month, his second goal for the club again came against one of Brandon's former teams, as he once again came off the substitutes' bench to score in a 3–0 victory over Chesterfield. However, he continued to struggle to hold down a regular first-team place and when new manager Peter Taylor took over, Brandon was one of a number of players released early from his contract. He had played just 31 games during his two seasons with City, scoring three goals.

=== BEC Tero Sasana ===
After his release from Bradford, Brandon spent a period of time training with Scottish-side Dundee United, although that was because he was visiting his friend and former teammate Danny Cadamarteri and would not be offered a contract, before he was offered a trial with Port Vale in July 2010. It proved to be an unsuccessful trial, with Brandon spending time away from the game. He later held talks with Conference North side Guiseley, a non-league team from near Bradford. At the start of 2011, he signed for Thai Premier League side BEC Tero Sasana.

== Style of play ==
Brandon is principally a midfielder who plays anywhere in the midfield, but has also been used just behind a pair of strikers or in attack. At Chesterfield, his ability to take on opposition defenders, create openings for teammates and score "wonder goals" helped him to win a number of awards. His former manager, Peter Jackson has also praised Brandon's "workrate and skill".

== Career statistics ==
As of 1 July 2010

Appearances and goals by club, season and competition
Club	Season	League			FA Cup		League Cup		Other		Total	
Club	Season	Division	Apps	Goals	Apps	Goals	Apps	Goals	Apps	Goals	Apps	Goals
Torquay United	1999–2000	Third Division	42	5	4	1	2	0	2	0	50	6
Torquay United	2000–01	Third Division	2	0	0	0	0	0	0	0	2	0
Torquay United	2001–02	Third Division	27	3	1	0	2	1	1	0	31	4
Torquay United	Total		71	8	5	1	4	1	3	0	83	10
Chesterfield	2002–03	Second Division	36	7	1	0	2	1	2	2	41	10
Chesterfield	2003–04	Second Division	43	4	1	0	1	0	2	2	47	6
Chesterfield	Total		79	11	2	0	3	1	4	4	88	16
Huddersfield Town	2004–05	League One	44	6	1	0	1	0	0	0	46	6
Huddersfield Town	2005–06	League One	40	3	3	1	2	0	1	0	46	4
Huddersfield Town	2006–07	League One	23	1	0	0	0	0	1	0	24	1
Huddersfield Town	2007–08	League One	28	2	2	1	1	0	1	0	32	3
Huddersfield Town	Total		135	12	6	2	4	0	3	0	148	14
Blackpool (loan)	2006–07	League One	5	2	0	0	0	0	0	0	5	2
Bradford City	2008–09	League Two	7	0	0	0	0	0	0	0	7	0
Bradford City	2009–10	League Two	20	2	0	0	0	0	4	1	24	3
Bradford City	Total		27	2	0	0	0	0	4	1	31	3
BEC Tero Sasana	2011	Thai Premier League	14	1	0	0	0	0	0	0	0	0
Career total			317	35	13	3	11	2	14	5	355	45

== Honours ==
Chesterfield

- Player of the season: 2002–03
