= Adnan Ahmed =

Pakistani footballer (born 1984)

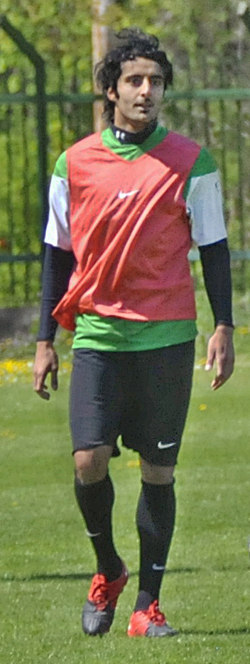
- Ahmed training with Ferencvárosi TC in April 2010

Personal information
- Full name: Adnan Farooq Ahmed
- Date of birth: 7 June 1984 (age 42)
- Place of birth: Burnley, England
- Height: 5 ft 10 in (1.78 m)
- Position: Midfielder

Youth career
- –1995: Bury
- 1995–1997: Manchester United
- 1997–2003: Huddersfield Town

Senior career*
| Years | Team | Apps | (Gls) |
| 2003–2007 | Huddersfield Town | 41 | (1) |
| 2007–2009 | Tranmere Rovers | 6 | (0) |
| 2008 | → Mansfield Town (loan) | 9 | (2) |
| 2009 | → Port Vale (loan) | 5 | (1) |
| 2009–2010 | Ferencváros | 14 | (0) |
| 2009–2010 | Ferencváros II | 3 | (0) |
| 2010–2011 | Aboumoslem | 5 | (0) |
| 2011–2012 | Bradford Park Avenue | | |
| 2012–2013 | Nelson | 11 | (2) |
| 2013 | Droylsden | 6 | (1) |
| 2013–2014 | Nelson | 17 | (2) |
| 2016 | Nelson | 6 | (0) |
| Total | | 123 | (9) |

International career
| 2007–2013 | Pakistan | 27 | (4) |
- * Club domestic league appearances and goals

Adnan Farooq Ahmed (Urdu: عدنان فاروق احمد; born 7 June 1984) is a former professional footballer who played as a midfielder. Born in England, he represented the Pakistan national team. He had an 11-year career in football, including a six-year international career in which he scored four goals and won 27 caps.

Ahmed came through the youth academy at Manchester United before going on to turn professional for Huddersfield Town in 2003. After three years, he transferred to Tranmere Rovers. After a two-year spell, which included loans to Mansfield Town and Port Vale, he signed with Hungarian club Ferencvárosi TC in 2009. A year later, he moved to Iran for a brief spell with Aboumoslem. He returned to England and, in October 2011, joined Bradford Park Avenue. He switched to Nelson in May 2012 and returned to Nelson after a brief spell with Droylsden in 2013. He helped Nelson to win the North West Counties League Division One title in 2013–14.

== Early life ==
Ahmed was born in Burnley and lived in Barnoldswick, Lancashire during his early life, attending Moorland School in Clitheroe. Ahmed is a British Asian of Pakistani descent. His family originate from Gujrat in Pakistan.

== Club career ==
=== Huddersfield Town ===
Initially part of Bury youth academy, as well as a two-year stint at Manchester United Academy afterwards, Ahmed chose to join Huddersfield Town where he turned professional. Despite making a few appearances for the club in league and cup competitions since turning professional, Ahmed's career has been hampered by persistent injury troubles. Ahmed has the unfortunate distinction of being the very first player to be sent off at the Keepmoat Stadium, the new home of Doncaster Rovers. He was shown the red card for a two-footed challenge on Rovers' Mark McCammon, the scorer of the very first goal in the stadium during Huddersfield's 3–0 defeat on 1 January 2007.

In January 2007, Ahmed went to Lincoln City, who had shown an interest in him, on a one-week trial with Huddersfield manager Peter Jackson saying "It will be a good experience for him and will hopefully make him appreciate what he's got here". However, no deal was done between the clubs and as a result the player returned to Huddersfield. He was released from the club in May 2007.

=== Tranmere Rovers ===
On 25 May 2007, it was announced that Ahmed had joined Tranmere Rovers side on a free transfer, becoming manager Ronnie Moore's first summer signing of 2007. He made his debut coming on as a substitute in the second half at home in a 1–1 draw with Yeovil Town on 1 September 2007. However, competition for places in midfield saw him make just five further appearances during his debut season with the club.

Because of a lack of any real first-team opportunities, Ahmed went on loan to Conference National side Mansfield Town at the end of October 2008, making his first-team debut in a 2–0 defeat away to Torquay United on 1 November 2008. He became an instant hit with the Mansfield fans scoring a penalty in the 3–0 win against Salisbury City, also scoring a diving header against Weymouth to set up a 2–1 victory. After returning to Tranmere, he joined Port Vale on trial. He went on loan to Vale on 21 January 2009, with his wages covered by an anonymous sponsor. Ahmed opened his account with the "Valiants" by scoring the match winner in a 2–0 win at Macclesfield Town on 25 February 2009. He returned to Tranmere in late March after Vale manager Dean Glover rejected the opportunity to extend his loan, despite impressing fans with his performances.

=== Ferencváros ===
In July 2009, having impressed the coaching staff during pre-season trial matches at Hungarian team Ferencvárosi TC, Ahmed signed a two-year deal with the team to play in Nemzeti Bajnokság I. He played his first competitive game for the team in a 2–0 win over Diósgyőri VTK in the 2009–10 Hungarian League Cup on 29 July 2009. After one season, he was released from the team, having played 20 games in all competitions with 1 goal in a 4–2 win against Kecskeméti TE in the Hungarian League Cup on 23 September 2009.

In July 2010 he went on trial at Scottish Premier League side Aberdeen, but was not offered a contract.

=== Aboomoslem ===
In September 2010, after taking part in training sessions and trials, Adnan was given a one-year contract with Mashhad-based Iranian club Aboumoslem for the 2010–11 Azadegan League season. He made his first-team debut in a 1–0 home win over Iranjavan Bushehr on 7 October 2010. However, at the start of 2011, Adnan left the side and returned to England as a free agent after playing just five games for Aboomoslem.

=== Nelson & Droylsden ===
Ahmed signed with Northern Premier League Premier Division club Bradford Park Avenue in October 2011. He scored a stoppage-time winner on his debut, helping Avenue to defeat Chester 2–1 on 2 November. In May 2012, he joined Nelson in Division One of the North West Counties League. In November 2013, Ahmed rejoined Nelson after a short spell playing for Conference North side Droylsden. He helped the "Admirals" to the Division One title in the 2013–14 season. He made three appearances at the start of the 2014–15 campaign but did not feature after mid-August.

However, Ahmed re-joined Nelson once again in January 2016. He balanced part-time football with working as operating director of his father's bedroom furniture company.

== International career ==
Ahmed received his first formal call up to the Pakistan national football team for their World Cup 2010 qualification against Iraq on 22 October 2007 in Lahore, where he made his debut in a hefty 7–0 loss, and 28 October 2007 for the return leg in Aleppo, Syria which surprisingly finished goal-less between the two sides, although Iraq went through the next round on aggregate scores. Adnan scored his first goal for Pakistan in a humiliating 7–1 loss against Sri Lanka in the 2008 AFC Challenge Cup qualification.

Ahmed took part in the 2008 SAFF Cup, where he scored a goal against arch-rivals India in a disappointing 2–1 loss and ended Pakistan's chances of going past the group stage. Ahmed scored two goals in 2010 AFC Challenge Cup qualification against Taiwan 1–1 draw and against Brunei 6–0. Still, in the end, they finished second and could not qualify for 2010 AFC Challenge Cup. He showed very good performance and skill. Ahmed also took part in the 2009 SAFF Cup hosted by Bangladesh, but it was again a disappointment as Pakistan crashed out in the group stages once again; Ahmed played two games in which he missed a late crucial penalty in the 1–0 loss against Sri Lanka. After missing out on the Pakistan squad for the 2010 Asian Games football tournament, Adnan returned to the senior team for the 2012 AFC Challenge Cup qualification Group B held in Malaysia where he played in all 3 games and starred in midfield despite Pakistan once again disappointing in another qualification tournament.

== Personal life ==
After retirement, Ahmed set up a football academy alongside Nathan Ellington.

== Career statistics ==
=== Club statistics ===
Appearances and goals by club, season and competition
| Club | Season | League | | | National cup (Note: Includes FA Cup, Magyar Kupa, Iranian Hazfi Cup) | | League cup (Note: Includes Football League Cup) | | Other | | Total | |
| Club | Season | Division | Apps | Goals | Apps | Goals | Apps | Goals | Apps | Goals | Apps | Goals |
|---|---|---|---|---|---|---|---|---|---|---|---|---|
| Huddersfield Town | 2003–04 | Third Division | 1 | 0 | 0 | 0 | 0 | 0 | 0 | 0 | 1 | 0 |
| Huddersfield Town | 2004–05 | League One | 18 | 1 | 0 | 0 | 0 | 0 | 2 (Note: Appearance(s) in Football League Trophy) | 1 | 20 | 2 |
| Huddersfield Town | 2005–06 | League One | 13 | 0 | 1 | 0 | 0 | 0 | 0 | 0 | 14 | 0 |
| Huddersfield Town | 2006–07 | League One | 9 | 0 | 0 | 0 | 0 | 0 | 1 | 0 | 10 | 0 |
| Huddersfield Town | Total | | 41 | 1 | 1 | 0 | 0 | 0 | 3 | 1 | 45 | 2 |
| Tranmere Rovers | 2007–08 | League One | 6 | 0 | 0 | 0 | 0 | 0 | 1 | 0 | 7 | 0 |
| Tranmere Rovers | 2008–09 | League One | 0 | 0 | 0 | 0 | 0 | 0 | 0 | 0 | 0 | 0 |
| Tranmere Rovers | Total | | 6 | 0 | 0 | 0 | 0 | 0 | 1 | 0 | 7 | 0 |
| Mansfield Town (loan) | 2008–09 | Conference Premier | 9 | 2 | 1 | 0 | — | | 0 | 0 | 10 | 2 |
| Port Vale (loan) | 2008–09 | League Two | 5 | 1 | — | | — | | — | | 5 | 1 |
| Ferencváros | 2009–10 | Nemzeti Bajnokság I | 14 | 0 | 0 | 0 | 6 | 1 | — | | 20 | 1 |
| Ferencváros II | 2009–10 | Nemzeti Bajnokság III | 3 | 0 | — | | — | | — | | 3 | 0 |
| Aboumoslem | 2010–11 | Azadegan League | 5 | 0 | — | | — | | — | | 5 | 0 |
| Nelson | 2012–13 | NWCFL First Division | 11 | 2 | — | | — | | 2 (Note: 1 appearance in Lancashire FA Challenge Trophy, 1 appearance in NWCFL League Challenge Cup) | 0 | 13 | 2 |
| Droylsden | 2012–13 | Conference North | 6 | 1 | 0 | 0 | — | | 0 | 0 | 6 | 1 |
| Nelson | 2013–14 | NWCFL First Division | 14 | 2 | — | | — | | 2 (Note: 1 appearance in Lancashire FA Challenge Trophy, 1 appearance in NWCFL First Division Challenge Cup) | 1 | 16 | 3 |
| Nelson | 2014–15 | NWCFL Premier Division | 3 | 0 | 0 | 0 | — | | 0 | 0 | 3 | 0 |
| Nelson | 2015–16 | NWCFL Premier Division | 6 | 0 | 0 | 0 | — | | 0 | 0 | 6 | 0 |
| Nelson | Total | | 23 | 2 | 0 | 0 | — | | 2 | 1 | 25 | 3 |
| Career total | | | 123 | 9 | 2 | 0 | 6 | 1 | 8 | 2 | 139 | 12 |

=== International ===
Appearances and goals by national team and year
| National team | Year | Apps | Goals |
|---|---|---|---|
| Pakistan | 2007 | 2 | 0 |
| Pakistan | 2008 | 6 | 2 |
| Pakistan | 2009 | 5 | 2 |
| Pakistan | 2011 | 8 | 0 |
| Pakistan | 2013 | 6 | 0 |
| Total | | 27 | 4 |

Scores and results list Pakistan's goal tally first, score column indicates score after each Ahmed goal.

List of international goals scored by Adnan Ahmed
| No. | Date | Venue | Opponent | Score | Result | Competition |
|---|---|---|---|---|---|---|
| 1 | 4 April 2008 | Chengshan Stadium, Taipei, Taiwan | Sri Lanka | 1–2 | 1–7 | 2008 AFC Challenge Cup qualification |
| 2 | 17 June 2008 | Rasmee Dhandu Stadium, Malé, Maldives | India | 1–2 | 1–2 | 2008 SAFF Championship |
| 3 | 4 April 2009 | Sugathadasa Stadium, Colombo, Sri Lanka | Chinese Taipei | 1–1 | 1–1 | 2010 AFC Challenge Cup Qualifier |
| 4 | 6 April 2009 | Sugathadasa Stadium, Colombo, Sri Lanka | Brunei | 6–0 | 6–0 | 2010 AFC Challenge Cup Qualifier |

== Honours ==
Nelson

- North West Counties Football League First Division: 2013–14

== See also ==
- British Asians in association football
- List of Pakistan international footballers born outside Pakistan
