= Aaron Hardy =

English footballer

Personal information
- Date of birth: 26 May 1986 (age 40)
- Place of birth: South Elmsall, England
- Height: 5 ft 8 in (1.73 m)
- Position: Defender

Team information
- Current team: Tadcaster Albion

Youth career
- 2002–2005: Huddersfield Town

Senior career*
Years	Team	Apps	(Gls)
2005–2008	Huddersfield Town	15	(0)
2008–2009	Harrogate Town	12	(0)
2009–2012	FC Halifax Town	75	(1)
2012	Bradford Park Avenue	0	(0)
2012	Farsley Celtic		(0)
2012–2013	Guiseley		
2013	Farsley Celtic		
2017	Tadcaster Albion	0	(0)
- * Club domestic league appearances and goals

Aaron Hardy (born 26 May 1986) is an English former professional footballer who played as a defender.

== Career ==
Hardy started his career with Huddersfield Town and made his debut for them on 17 October 2006, in their 2–1 home defeat against Doncaster Rovers in Round One of the Football League Trophy. He got many plaudits for his play at right-back in an otherwise poor team performance. Then, on 21 October, he played his first league match in Town's 2–1 win at Port Vale.

In the televised encounter on 5 January 2007 at Yeovil Town, substitute Hardy scored an own goal in Yeovil's 3–1 win when he turned Lee Morris's cross past Matt Glennon.

On 9 May, he was offered a six-month contract by new Huddersfield Town boss Andy Ritchie, which he accepted on 31 May. On 28 September, after a series of good performances at right-back as cover for the injured Frank Sinclair, his contract was extended to the end of the season.

Hardy was released by Huddersfield Town 6 May 2008. In July 2008, he signed for Harrogate Town where he made 12 appearances before following manager Neil Aspin to FC Halifax Town in July 2009.

In June 2012 he joined Bradford Park Avenue, although his spell at The Horsfall was short lived as in August, he joined Farsley.

Becoming the ninth signing of the management duo Michael Morton and Simon Collins, Hardy joined Tadcaster Albion in Northern Premier League Division One North.
