= Matty Young (footballer, born 1985) =

English footballer

Personal information
- Full name: Matthew Young
- Date of birth: 25 October 1985 (age 41)
- Place of birth: Leeds, England
- Position: Midfielder

Youth career
- 2001–2005: Huddersfield Town

Senior career*
Years	Team	Apps	(Gls)
2005–2008	Huddersfield Town	39	(2)
2008–2009	Harrogate Town	34	(3)
2009–2010	Farsley Celtic	24	(77)
2010	Guiseley	10	(77)
2010	Ossett Town	14	(2)
2010–2013	Worksop Town	1	(1)
2013–2014	Farsley Celtic	10	(?)
2014–2015	Frickley Athletic		
- * Club domestic league appearances and goals as of 17:49, 4 July 2008 (UTC)

Matthew Young (born 25 October 1985) is an English former professional footballer who played as a midfielder. He began his career at Huddersfield Town in League One.
