= Gerry Murphy (football manager) =

Irish football manager (1943–2025)

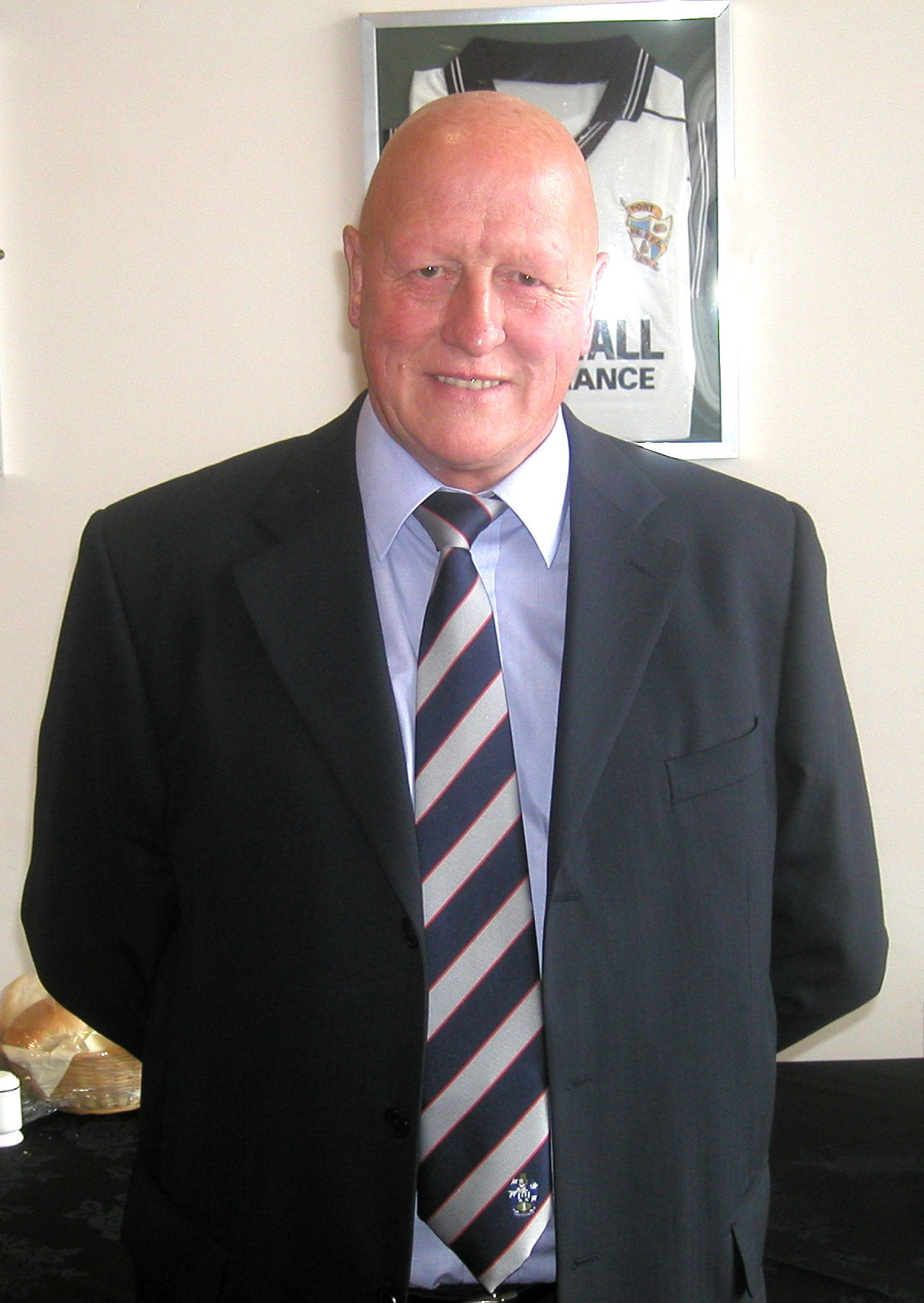
- Murphy in 2006

Personal information
- Full name: Gerard Murphy
- Date of birth: 22 July 1943
- Place of birth: Dublin, Ireland
- Date of death: 23 May 2025 (aged 81)
- Place of death: Huddersfield, United Kingdom

Managerial career
- Years: Team
- 1970-1975: Rawthorpe WMC
- 1975–1983: Bradley Rangers
- 2007: Huddersfield Town (caretaker)
- 2008: Huddersfield Town (caretaker)
- 2008: Huddersfield Town (caretaker)

Gerard Murphy (22 July 1943 – 23 May 2025) was an Irish football manager who was the director of football development at Huddersfield Town between 1988 and 2009. He was the academy manager between 1999 and 17 April 2007, and was caretaker manager of Huddersfield Town in three different spells.

== Career ==
=== Award ===
Murphy won the Football League's Contribution to Football award on 5 March 2006 selected by listeners of BBC Radio 5 Live's Sport on Five.

=== Huddersfield Town Academy ===
In February 2007, Huddersfield's 23-man first-team squad included 15 academy graduates. The most notable graduate was Jon Stead who was sold to Premier League side Blackburn Rovers for £1.25m in February 2004.

=== Managerial positions ===
Following Peter Jackson's contract termination on 6 March 2007, Murphy was put in temporary charge of Huddersfield Town's first team affairs, a role that lasted for six games until 11 April 2007.

Then on 17 April 2007, Murphy was appointed director of football development. In addition to his position as academy director he was handed control of the club's scouting activities.

== Death ==
Murphy died on 23 May 2025, at the age of 81.
