= James Hand (footballer) =

Irish footballer

Personal information
- Full name: James Francis Hand
- Date of birth: 22 October 1986 (age 40)
- Place of birth: Drogheda, Ireland
- Height: 5 ft 9 in (1.75 m)
- Position: Winger

Youth career
- 1998–2000: Carrick Rovers
- 2000–2002: Monaghan United
- 2002–2003: Belvedere
- 2003–2006: Huddersfield Town

Senior career*
Years	Team	Apps	(Gls)
2006–2007	Huddersfield Town	10	(0)

International career
2006	Republic of Ireland U21	21	(1)
- * Club domestic league appearances and goals

James Francis Hand (born 22 October 1986) is an Irish footballer. Hand played with Manor Farm, Carrick Rovers, Monaghan United and Belvedere, before signing for Huddersfield Town.

== Career ==
Born in Drogheda, County Louth, Hand made his Town debut against Oldham Athletic on 7 April 2007, replacing Gary Taylor-Fletcher at half-time and was instrumental in the set-up of Luke Beckett's equaliser.

Hand has played for the Republic of Ireland national under-21 football team.
