= Martin McIntosh =

Scottish footballer and manager

Personal information
- Full name: Martin Wyllie McIntosh
- Date of birth: 19 March 1971 (age 55)
- Place of birth: East Kilbride, Scotland
- Position: Defender

Youth career
- 1988: Tottenham Hotspur

Senior career*
Years	Team	Apps	(Gls)
1988–1991	St Mirren	4	(0)
1991–1994	Clydebank	65	(10)
1994–1997	Hamilton Academical	99	(12)
1997–2000	Stockport County	99	(5)
2000–2001	Hibernian	13	(0)
2001	→ Rotherham United (loan)	15	(2)
2001–2005	Rotherham United	107	(14)
2005–2007	Huddersfield Town	48	(4)
2006	→ Grimsby Town (loan)	4	(0)
2007–2008	Mansfield Town	11	(1)
2008–2009	Alfreton Town	15	(4)
2009	Guiseley	0	(0)
2011	Worksop Town	1	(0)
Total		481	(52)

International career
1998	Scotland B	2	(1)

Managerial career
- 2010–2011: Worksop Town
- 2012–2018: Buxton
- 2018: Ilkeston Town
- 2018–2019: Frickley Athletic
- 2020: Grantham Town
- * Club domestic league appearances and goals

Martin Wyllie McIntosh (born 19 March 1971) is a Scottish football manager and former professional footballer.

In a career that began in 1988, the defender made just under 500 appearances in the Scottish Football League, the Scottish Premier League and the English Football League. most notably with lengthy spells at Clydebank, Hamilton Academical, Stockport County, Rotherham United and Huddersfield Town. He also turned out professionally for St Mirren, Hibernian, Grimsby Town and Mansfield Town before finishing his career in Non-league football with Alfreton Town, Guiseley and Worksop Town He later managed non-League clubs Worksop Town, Buxton, Ilkeston Town, Frickley Athletic and Grantham Town.

== Career ==
=== Playing career ===
McIntosh started his football career as a junior at Tottenham Hotspur in 1988 before joining St Mirren, where he made four appearances in three seasons. Spells with Clydebank, where he made 75 league and cup appearances, and Hamilton Academical, for whom he started 114 games, followed before he moved to Stockport County in August 1997 for a transfer fee of £80,000. He made over 100 appearances for Stockport before a £250,000 transfer took him back to Scotland with Scottish Premier League club Hibernian in February 2000. Injury and competition for places restricted his opportunities at Hibernian to 18 appearances and he joined Rotherham United on a three-month loan in August 2001. He joined Rotherham on a permanent basis in November 2001 for a fee of £125,000. He made over 130 appearances in total in four years at Rotherham and was made club captain.

After Rotherham were relegated at the end of the 2004–05 season, McIntosh was released by manager Mick Harford, who was trying to reduce the average age of the squad, and joined Huddersfield Town on a two-year contract. A knee injury suffered in August 2005, which required surgery, ruled him out of four months of the 2005–06 season. He returned to the side in December 2005 and made a total of 26 appearances as Huddersfield reached the Football League One play-offs in May 2006.

At the beginning of the 2006–07 season, McIntosh was loaned to Football League Two side Grimsby Town for one month. A request by Grimsby to extend the loan was turned down and McIntosh returned to Huddersfield in September 2006. He fell out of favour with manager Peter Jackson but returned to the side in March 2007 after Jackson was sacked. McIntosh was released by Huddersfield and joined Mansfield Town in June 2007. He made eleven appearances for Mansfield and was released in March 2008. He joined Conference North club Alfreton Town in May 2008.

McIntosh signed for NPL Premier Division side Guiseley on a one-year contract in August 2009, but he retired as a player one month later and decided to go into coaching.

=== Managerial career ===
On 25 September 2009, Martin was named new first team coach at Rotherham United, working for manager Ronnie Moore. He was appointed manager of Worksop Town in October 2010. He temporarily came out of playing retirement in 2011 and played for Worksop to cover for injuries. McIntosh was sacked as Worksop manager in September 2011 following a run of one win from ten games and elimination from the FA Cup.

On 4 February 2012, McIntosh was appointed manager of Northern Premier League club Buxton. He left Buxton in February 2018.

On 6 September 2018, McIntosh was appointed manager of Midland League Premier Division club Ilkeston Town. He left the club by mutual consent after three months in the job. Although Ilkeston were top of the league at the time of McIntosh's departure, the club had been knocked out of the FA Vase by lower league opposition in the form of Eastwood.

In December 2018, McIntosh was appointed manager of Frickley Athletic. He left the club in April the following year. In March 2020 he was appointed manager of Grantham Town. He left the club in December the same year.
