= John McAliskey =

English-born Irish footballer

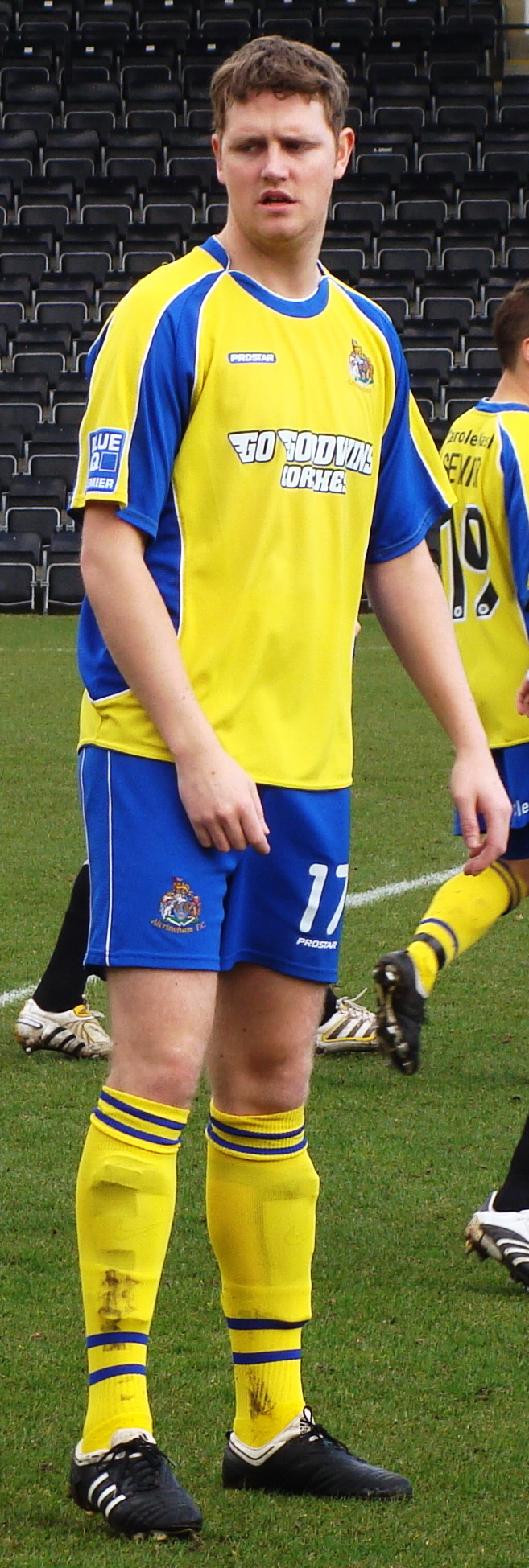
- McAliskey playing for Altrincham

Personal information
- Full name: John James McAliskey
- Date of birth: 2 September 1984 (age 42)
- Place of birth: Huddersfield, England
- Position: Striker

Youth career
- Huddersfield Town

Senior career*
Years	Team	Apps	(Gls)
2003–2007	Huddersfield Town	43	(7)
2005	→ Torquay United (loan)	3	(0)
2006	→ Wrexham (loan)	3	(0)
2007–2008	Mansfield Town	16	(2)
2008	Alfreton Town	?	(?)
2009	Salford City	?	(?)
2009	Witton Albion	?	(?)
2009–2010	Altrincham	20	(2)
2010–2011	Northwich Victoria	17	(3)
2011	→ Matlock Town (loan)	?	(?)
- * Club domestic league appearances and goals

John James McAliskey (born 2 September 1984) is a former professional footballer who played in the Football League for Huddersfield Town, Torquay United, Wrexham and Mansfield Town. Born in Huddersfield, England, he represented the Republic of Ireland at under-21 level.

== Career ==
He first played for Huddersfield Town during the 2003–04 season.

He was sent on loan to Torquay United during the 2005–06 season, due to lack of match action. He has again failed to make an impression, and was sent out on loan to Wrexham.

On 9 May 2007, he was released by the Terriers signing for Mansfield Town on 7 June on a one-year deal. After just 16 League games he was released by Mansfield on 27 March 2008.

He has also played for Alfreton Town, Salford City and Witton Albion.

On 20 November 2009, Altrincham signed McAliskey. Since leaving the Robins, he has played for both Northwich Victoria and Matlock Town, on loan.

As of April 2016, McAliskey has last been known to be playing for Huddersfield YMCA of the West Riding County Amateur Premier League.

== Honours ==
Huddersfield Town

- Football League Third Division play-offs: 2004
